= Absolutely Seriously =

1961 film

- Russian: Совершенно серьёзно
- Directed by: Eldar Ryazanov; Naum Trakhtenberg; Eduard Zmoiro; Vladimir Semakov; Leonid Gaidai
- Written by: Eldar Ryazanov; Emil Braginsky; Vilyam Kozlov; Boris Laskin; Vladimir Dykhovichny; Moris Slobodskoy; Leonid Gaidai
- Produced by: Ivan Pyryev; G. Meyerovich
- Starring: Anatoli Papanov; Sergey Filippov; Rostislav Plyatt; Aleksandr Belyavsky
- Cinematography: Leonid Krainenkov; Savva Kulish; Vladimir Boganov; Anatoly Nitochkin; Konstantin Brovin
- Music by: Anatoly Lepin; Bogdan Trotsyuk; Yevgeny Krylatov; Arkady Ostrovsky; Nikita Bogoslovsky; Aleksandr Zatsepin
- Release date: 1961
- Country: Soviet Union
- Language: Russian

Absolutely Seriously (Russian: Совершенно серьёзно) is a 1961 Soviet comedy anthology film directed by Eldar Ryazanov, Naum Trakhtenberg, Eduard Zmoiro, Vladimir Semakov and Leonid Gaidai. The best known novella is Dog Barbos and Unusual Cross which is often screened separately.

== Plot ==
The film is a comedy almanac, which includes five short stories.

== Cast ==
- Sergey Filippov as cameo, almanac presenter
- Pavel Tarasov as movie critic
- Pyotr Repnin as movie critic
- Igor Sretensky as screenwriter

=== How Robinson Was Created ===
- Anatoli Papanov as editor of magazine "Adventure Business"
- Sergey Filippov as writer Moldavantsev/Robinson Crusoe
- Zinovy Gerdt as narrator (uncredited)

=== A Story with Pirozhki ===
- Rostislav Plyatt as customer
- Georgy Georgiu as store manager
- Boris Novikov as chief of department
- Emma Treyvas as chief of section
- Svetlana Kharitonova as cashier Tonechka
- Rina Zelyonaya as lady in queue

=== Foreigners ===
- Vladimir Kulik as Zhora Volobuyev the stilyaga
- Maria Vladimirovna Mironova as Zhora's mother
- Maria Kravchunovskaya as Zhora's grandmother
- Aleksandr Belyavsky as "Frank" the journalist
- Ilya Rutberg as Edik "Kosoi" the stilyaga
- Tatiana Bestaeva as "Mary" the stilyaga

=== Bon Appetit ===
- Serafim Anikeyev as visitor, the former waiter
- Marina Polbentseva as waiter
- Olga Viklandt as barmaid
- Nina Mager as young waiter
- Yelizaveta Nikishchikhina as café visitor (uncredited)
- Pavel Vinnik as cook (uncredited)
- Georgy Millyar as doorman (uncredited)

=== Dog Barbos and Unusual Cross ===
- Yevgeny Morgunov as Pro
- Yuri Nikulin as Fool
- Georgy Vitsin as Coward
- Dog Bryokh as Dog Barbos
- Georgy Millyar as fishery supervision inspector in a boat
