= Operation Y and Shurik's Other Adventures =

- Film poster
- Russian: Операция «Ы» и другие приключения Шурика
- Directed by: Leonid Gaidai
- Written by: Moris Slobodskoy; Yakov Kostyukovsky; Leonid Gaidai
- Starring: Aleksandr Demyanenko; Aleksei Smirnov; Natalya Seleznyova; Yuri Nikulin; Georgy Vitsin; Yevgeny Morgunov
- Cinematography: Konstantin Brovin
- Edited by: Valentina Yankovskaya
- Music by: Aleksandr Zatsepin
- Distributed by: Mosfilm
- Release date: 16 August 1965
- Running time: 94 min
- Country: Soviet Union
- Language: Russian

Operation Y and Shurik's Other Adventures (Russian: Операция «Ы» и другие приключения Шурика, romanized: Operatsiya «Yery» i drugiye priklyucheniya Shurika) is a 1965 Soviet slapstick comedy film directed by Leonid Gaidai, starring Aleksandr Demyanenko, Natalya Seleznyova, Yuri Nikulin, Georgy Vitsin and Yevgeny Morgunov. The film consists of three independent parts: "Workmate" (Напарник, Naparnik), "Déjà vu" (Наваждение, Navazhdeniye) and "Operation Y" (Операция «Ы»). The plot follows the adventures of Shurik, the naive and nerdy Soviet student who often gets into ludicrous situations, but always finds a way out very neatly.

It was a hit movie and became the leader of Soviet film distribution in 1965.

== Plot ==
=== "Workmate" ===
On a bus a boor and drunkard named Fedya takes a seat reserved for children and disabled persons and then refuses to let a young pregnant woman sit claiming that "she is neither a child nor handicapped". Shurik, who is riding on the same bus, puts on a pair of sunglasses, and pretends to be visually impaired. When Fedya is forced to let Shurik sit in his seat, Shurik passes the seat to the pregnant woman. Fedya is enraged at being deceived and gets into a fight with Shurik. As a result, Fedya is arrested and sentenced to 15 days of community service (administrative arrest in USSR). Ironically, he is sent to serve his term to the same construction site where Shurik works part-time. The manager puts them on the same work crew. Fedya does not do his work properly, bullies Shurik, and plots to get revenge on the young student. When Shurik finally hits back, the two get involved in a chase throughout the construction site using building equipment and various materials as weapons. In the end Fedya is subdued and "reeducated" by Shurik.

=== "Déjà vu" ===
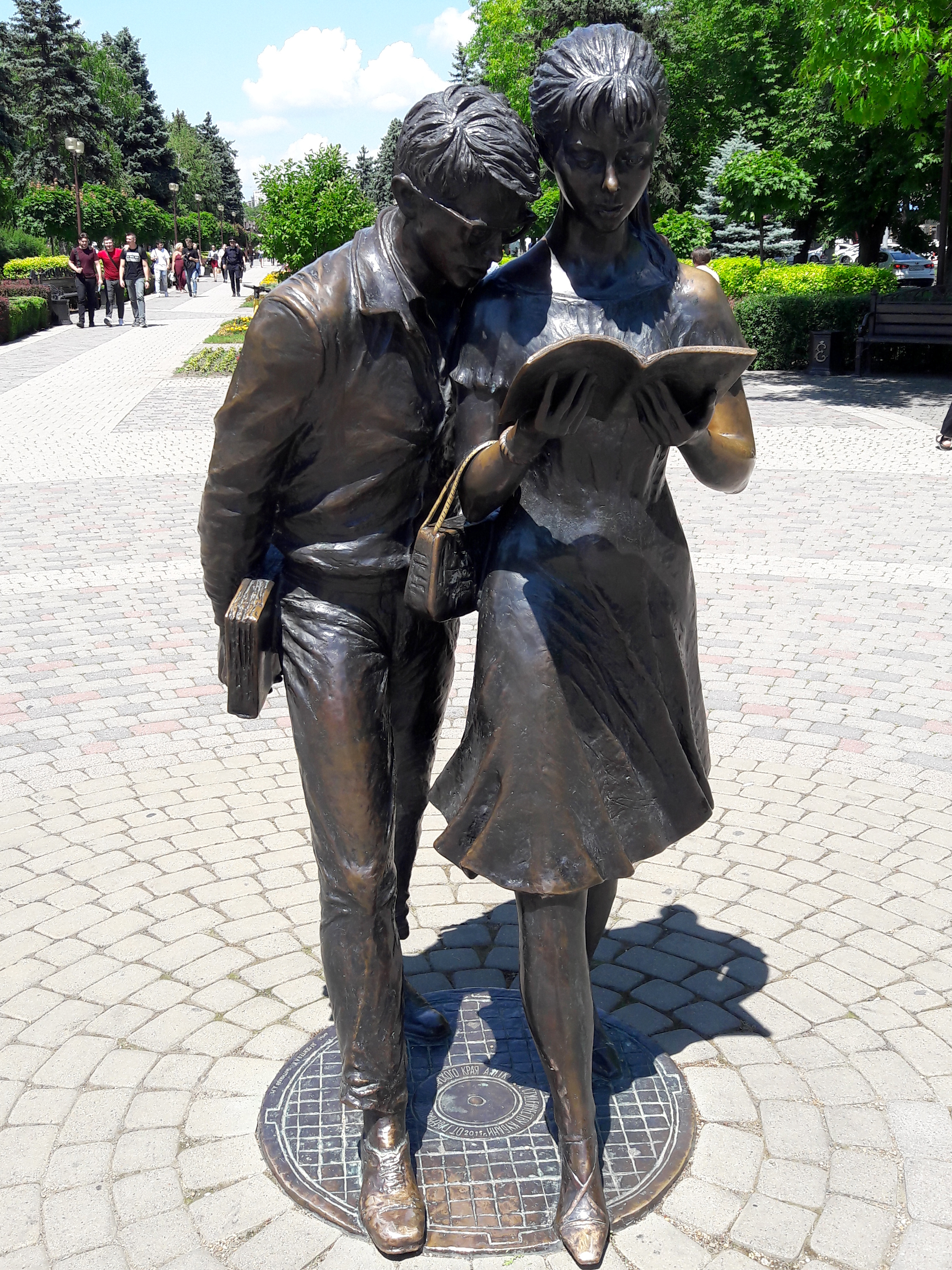
A monument to Shurik and Lida, Krasnodar

It's time for summer examinations at the University, and everyone is cramming for the exams. Shurik (and everyone else) is looking desperately for lecture notes and finally sees them in the hands of a girl on a streetcar, Lida, who is a student of the same university. As Shurik follows her reading the notebook over her shoulder, they become so deeply absorbed in reading the notes that Lida never looks up, instinctively assuming that Shurik is one of her fellow students. The two are completely engrossed in reading and never look at or speak to each other, following a sort of humorous pantomime.

They come into the girl's apartment and spend time there reading simultaneously with having a snack and resting, with the girl undressing, still completely unaware of each other's identity, then prepare to go back to the University. There Shurik is distracted from Lida's notebook by a fellow student and loses her as she walks in another direction. After passing the exam successfully, he is introduced to Lida by a mutual friend. Shurik does not recognize Lida but is enchanted by her. He walks her back home and, following an amusing incident involving a dog belonging to Lida's neighbors, finds himself in her apartment again, where he starts to feel as if he has been there before since he can guess where all the things are placed and all the "objects, scents and sounds" seem familiar to him. Lida assumes that he might be a telepathist and has an ability of precognition. She tells him to guess her wish that she has written on a piece of paper, "find the teddy bear". Shurik then kisses her. Although he failed to guess the wish, the kiss evokes romantic feelings in both of them, and they decide to meet again after the next exam.

As a subplot, another student, known by his nickname Numskull, tries to cheat his way through his Physics exam with the help of a concealed radio to communicate with another student, but has to dress up to an absurd degree to hide his crude equipment and attracts the examiner's attention by using radio jargon, but he seems to get away with it. However, the examiner promptly reveals a proper radio intercept suite in his bag, listens to the cheater calling him a fool, and then activates a radio jammer before approaching the offender and blowing his cover. They both laugh at the disguise, and Numskull gets a 5 (excellent) for his design (it is an engineering college) and a 2 (failure) for the exam.

=== "Operation Y" ===
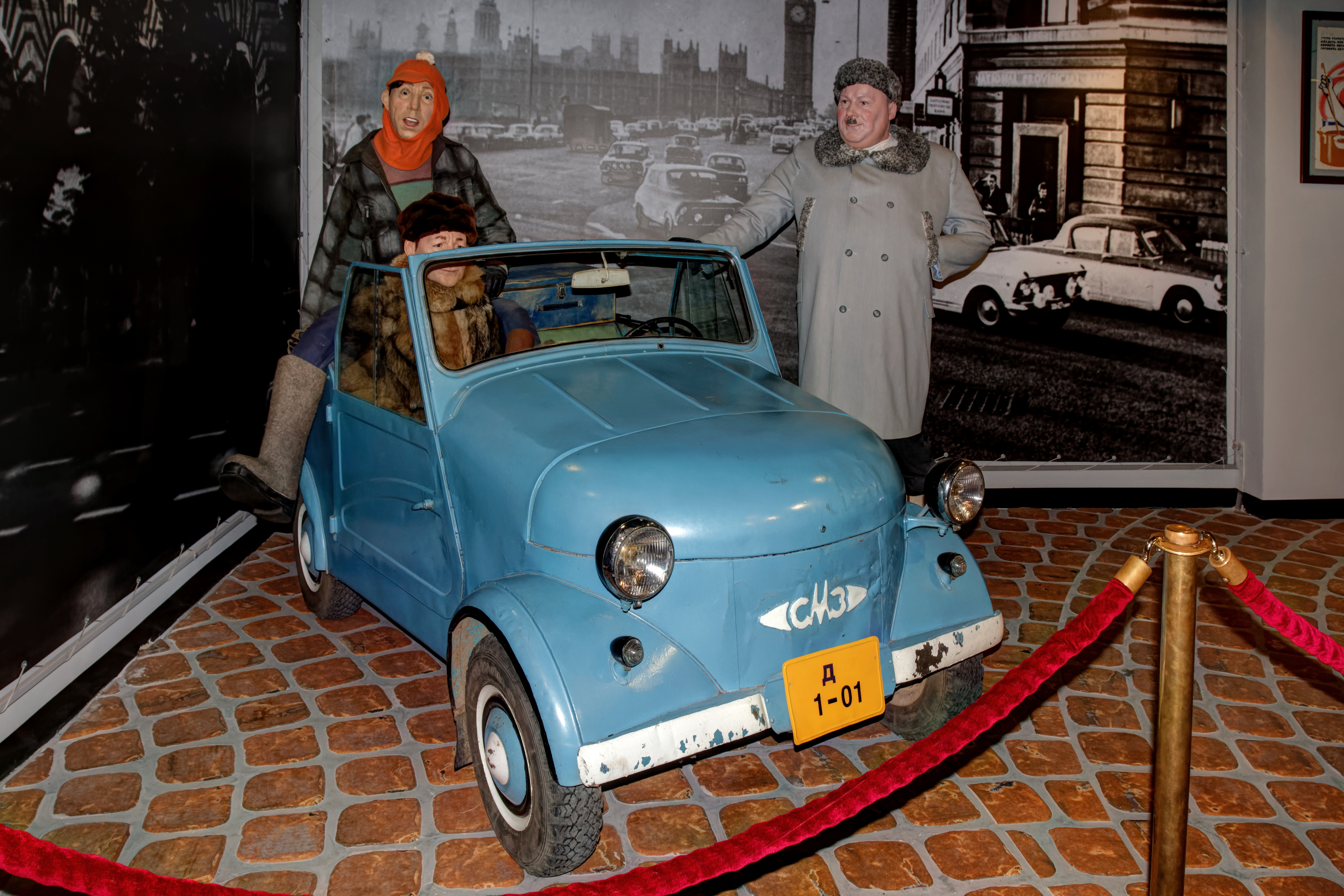
Fool, Coward and Pro by their CM3 S-3A. Vadim Zadorozhny’s Vehicle Museum, Arkhangelskoye, Moscow Oblast.

A warehouse manager, trying to cover up his theft, hires three petty criminals nicknamed Coward, Fool, and Pro to stage a break-in. Their elaborate plan goes wrong when Shurik is asked by his landlady, an elderly woman who usually guards the warehouse, to babysit her granddaughter during her shift. Once that proves to be too much for him, he replaces her as a guard while she takes care of the child. Surprised, Coward fails to neutralize the guard using a handkerchief soaked in chloroform as planned, putting himself to sleep instead. The culmination of the story is the "Warehouse Battle", involving Shurik and the criminals using various impromptu weapons such as musical instruments and rapiers. Finally, an agitated woman arrives at the warehouse and finds Shurik and the trio lying on a floor asleep – Coward having fainted earlier on, Fool and Pro having been "rendered harmless" by Shurik, and Shurik himself having fallen asleep after accidentally wiping his face with the chloroform soaked handkerchief. At the end of the segment, Shurik and the woman take the criminals to the police station.

== Production ==
- The film was shot in Leningrad (now Saint Petersburg), Odessa, Yalta, in Mosfilm pavilions, at Sviblovo District of Moscow and near the Moscow State University. The filming began on 27 July 1964. In October bad weather in Moscow hindered the completion of the outdoor scenes, so the shooting was relocated to Odessa and was complete on 22 November. The rest of the scenes were shot in Moscow and Leningrad. The lack of snow offered much difficulty filming the third episode about the burglary of a warehouse on a snowy winter night. In spring 1965 the editing of the film was mostly complete. The remaining short location shooting was made in Yalta.
- The film's plot is based loosely on a screenplay written by Moris Slobodsky and Yakov Kostyukovsky entitled Light-hearted Stories (Несерьёзные истории); it consisted of two novels about comical adventures of a young student Vladik Arkov, clumsy but very decent. A character of a "good guy" was popular in the Soviet art of that time, so Gaidai decided to follow this tendency shooting his next film. The story line was modified and the additional novel was written.
- More than one hundred actors took a screen test for the role of the student Vladik, but Gaidai was not satisfied with any of them. He had his own personality in mind as a prototype of the character, so when he first saw a photo of Aleksandr Demyanenko and then met him in person, he noticed the likeness to himself in the actor, and believed that the humble Demyanenko in glasses would be able to portray the awkward, naive and honest student.
- Before the shooting it was decided to dye Aleksandr's hair from brown to blond. Years later, his wife Lyudmila Akimovna recalled: "He was dyed mercilessly, until blisters appeared on his skin. The dyes were terrible back then. It is a good thing that Sasha's hair was so thick that despite all the experiments he did not go bald."
- Initially the name of the main character was Vladik (a diminutive of Vladislav). Later the director, impressed by Demyanenko, decided to name the character after the actor (Shurik is a diminutive of Aleksandr).
- Among those who took part in the audition for the main role was actor Valery Nosik. Eventually he appeared in the film as a student-gambler. Mikhail Pugovkin, who played the role of the construction site manager, was initially cast for the role of Fedya.
- At the session of the Art Council after the preliminary watching of the film, the critics panned the acting of Morgunov and Vitsin, while praising Nikulin, and were insisting on deleting scenes where Alexei Smirnov appears in blackface. However, no changes were made.

== Reception ==
The film proved enormously popular; it became the top Soviet film of 1965, with 69.6 million viewers. The novel Déjà vu, based on a story from a Polish magazine, won the Grand Prix Wawel Silver Dragon at the Kraków Film Festival in Poland in 1965.

The film became a source of quotes for Soviet people.

In spring 2012 a statue of Lida with Shurik reading the class notes over her shoulder was installed in front of the Kuban State Technological University, Krasnodar. In the same year, a sculpture "A student rushing to class" was installed on the steps of the main building of Togliatti State University; the prototype was Shurik from the film. In 2015, a statue of Lida and Shurik sitting on a bench was installed in the frontyard of Ryazan State University. There is a monument to Shurik and Lida in Moscow, at the entrance to the building of the Moscow Economic Institute, Tekstilshchiki District.

== Video release ==
At the end of the 1970s and the 1980s, the film was released on VHS as part of the series "Video Program of Goskino USSR". Starting in 1990, the film was released on VHS by the film association "Close-Up" (Krupniy plan) with Hi-Fi Stereo sound and encoded in PAL. Starting in 2001, Large Scale began fully restored releases of the film on DVD with enhanced video and sound quality using Dolby Digital 5.1 and Dolby Mono and incorporating subtitles. In 2012, the film was re-released in hardcover format by "Telesem'" magazine.

== Cast ==
- Aleksandr Demyanenko as Shurik

=== "Workmate" ===
- Aleksei Smirnov as Fedya the Boor
- Vladimir Basov as The Strict Policeman
- Emmanuil Geller as The Passenger with an Umbrella
- Rina Zelyonaya as An Old Woman in the bus
- Viktor Uralsky as The Cook at the Construction Site
- Mikhail Pugovkin as Pavel Stepanovich, Construction Works Manager
- Valentina Berezutskaya as A Woman in the bus

=== "Déjà vu" ===
- Natalya Seleznyova as Lida
- Svetlana Ageyeva as Lida's friend
- Vladimir Rautbart as Professor
- Viktor Pavlov as "Numskull"
- Viktor Zozulin as Kostya, a radio technician and Numskull's friend
- Valery Nosik as The Student-gambler
- Georgy Georgiu as Lida's Neighbor
- Zoya Fyodorova as Lida's Neighbor

=== "Operation Y" ===
- Yuri Nikulin as "Fool"
- Georgy Vitsin as "Coward"
- Yevgeny Morgunov as "Pro"
- Vladimir Vladislavsky as The Warehouse Manager
- Maria Kravchunovskaya as The Gran
- Tanya Gradova as Lenochka
- Vladimir Komarovsky as The Truck Driver
- Aleksei Smirnov as The Consumer at the Market

== Notes ==
- S-3A, a tiny car for the handicapped, featured in the Operation Y section of the film. It was used by Fool, Coward and Pro.
- Aleksandr Demyanenko was also featured as Shurik in the next film – Kidnapping, Caucasian Style; it is considered a semi-sequel of "Operation Y".
- The criminal trio of Fool, Coward, and Pro, portrayed by Nikulin, Vitsin and Morgunov, was featured in other movies written and directed by Gaidai, short films Dog Barbos and Unusual Cross (international title: Medor, le chien qui rapporte bien) (1960), Moonshiners (1961) and the 1967 hit Kidnapping, Caucasian Style. In 1968, trio featured in Yevgeny Karelov's Seven Old Men and a Girl comedy. Vitsin, Nikulin and Morgunov also appeared in Gaidai's 1962 film Strictly Business.
- The bus, where Shurik gets into a fight with the boor, is ZIL 158.
- In the segment Déjà Vu Shurik and Lida ride on a streetcar Tatra T3, license plate 530. It was from one of the first series of these streetcars, later Tatra's have three doors instead of two. Also in that scene a MTV-82 streetcar is visible (in typical coating with downfalling red line alongside).
- Tube radio in Lida's flat is RRR Dzintars (1960).

== Bibliography ==
- Saša Milić (2004). "Sight Gags and Satire in the Soviet Thaw: Operation Y and Other Shurik's Adventures". Senses of Cinema. 33.
