= Aleksandr Zatsepin =

Russian composer (born 1926)

- Александр Зацепин
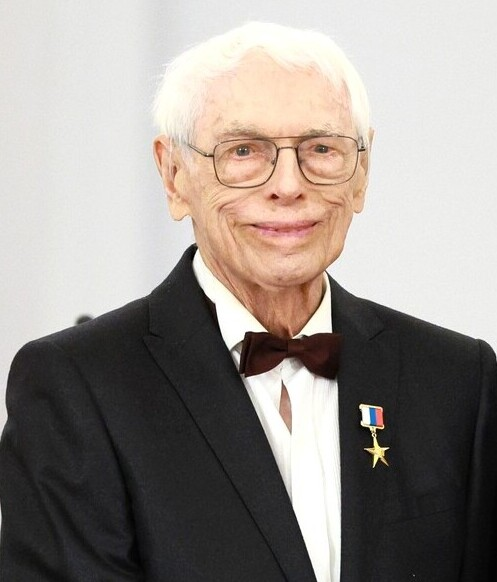
- Zatsepin in 2025
- Born: Aleksandr Sergeyevich Zatsepin; 10 March 1926 (age 100); Novosibirsk, Russian SFSR, Soviet Union
- Occupation: Composer
- Years active: 1947–present

Aleksandr Sergeyevich Zatsepin (Russian: Александр Сергеевич Зацепин; born 10 March 1926) is a Russian composer, known for his soundtracks to movies, notably comedies directed by Leonid Gaidai. He received the titles of People's Artist of Russia (2003) and Hero of Labour of the Russian Federation (2025).

== Biography ==
Aleksandr was born on 10 March 1926 in Novosibirsk in the family of the surgeon Sergei Dmitriyevich Zatsepin and teacher Valentina Boleslavovna Oksentovich. In 1941, Aleksandr's father was arrested under Article 58 and sentenced to 10 years in prison. After his release, he did not return to his family. The mother raised her son alone.

After graduating from high school number 12, he entered the Novosibirsk Institute of Railway Engineers. In March 1945 he was expelled from the university and drafted into the army. While in the military service, he independently mastered playing several instruments. The platoon commander, where Aleksandr served, was the future artist Yevgeny Matveyev, who invited Aleksandr to participate in the army amateur performances. As a result, he was admitted to the Novosibirsk Army Song and Dance Ensemble.

After leaving the reserve in 1947, he worked at the Novosibirsk Philharmonic as concertmaster. In 1956, he graduated from the Kazakh National Conservatory in Alma-Ata in piano and composition According to Zatsepin, if he had not joined the army, he would not have become a composer.

The future composer earned money by playing the accordion in restaurants. Then director Leonid Gaidai began work on the comedy Operation Y and Shurik's Other Adventures. Prior to that, he collaborated with Nikita Bogoslovsky, but for the next picture he decided to find a new composer. An aspiring composer was recommended to him, and the creative tandem took place. That is how Zatsepin began to work in the field of Soviet cinema.

Since 1965, Zatsepin worked with Leonid Derbenyov. Together they wrote over 100 songs.

In the mid-1970s, Zatsepin created his own home studio. He designed his own version of the Mellotron (which he called orchestrolla). A high technical level of the studio attracted many artists.

Zetsepin's work for the animated film The Mystery of the Third Planet became a cult classic and often described as a milestone in Soviet electronic music.

In the summer of 1982, the composer went to live in France without changing his citizenship. After his departure, his songs were mercilessly criticized, in particular, the newspaper Work on June 3, 1983 published an article "Is there only a moment?", Where it was said that this song, in fact, is about weak people who only whine that life is fleeting and care only about their own destiny. It was argued that this is frank vulgarity, clothed in a beautiful melody, and therefore easily remembered, disturbing young souls with false romanticism, philistine ideas of happiness. In 1986, with the advent of perestroika, the composer returned to the Soviet Union.

In 2020, Zatsepin began to work on an anthology of his works, as well as on the release of full-fledged soundtracks for the films 31 June, The Mystery of the Third Planet and Vesnukhin's Fantasies with new mixing and instruments; albums were released in various formats in 2021 and 2022, respectively. He also finished two musicals, "Ivan Tsarevich and The Grey Wolf" and "The Mystery of the Third Planet".

On 10 March 2026, Zatsepin turned 100. That same day, he also announced that he's working on musicals based on "Ivan Vasilievich: Back to the Future" and "31 June", among other works.

== Awards and honors ==
- Medal "For Distinguished Labour" (1959)
- Honored Worker of the Arts Industry of the Russian Federation (1997)
- People's Artist of Russia (2003)
- Order "For Merit to the Fatherland", 4th class (2011)
- Russian National Music Award (2021) – for invaluable contribution to the Russian musical culture
- Hero of Labour of the Russian Federation (3 March 2025) – for special services in the development of national musical art and many years of fruitful creative activity
- Nika Award for the Lifetime Achievement Award (24 March 2025)

== Selected songs ==
- "A Little Song About Bears" (1966, from the film Kidnapping, Caucasian Style)
- "If I Was a Sultan" (1966, from the film Kidnapping, Caucasian Style)
- "Island of Bad Luck" (1968, from the film The Diamond Arm)
- "The Song About Hares" (1968, from the film The Diamond Arm)
- "There Is Only a Moment" (1973, from the film The Land of Sannikov)
- "January Blizzard is Ringing" (1973, from the film Ivan Vasilievich: Back to the Future)
- "Conversation With Happiness" (1973, from the film Ivan Vasilievich: Back to the Future)
- "A Half-Educated Wizard" (1975, from the film Brave Shirak)
- "Where Does Childhood Go" (1977, from the film Vesnukhin's Fantasies)
- "World Without My Sweetheart" (1978, from the film 31 June)
- "Looking for You" (1978, from the film 31 June)
- "Star Bridge" (1978, from the film 31 June)
- "There Was Suddenly no Peace" (1989, from the film Private Detective, or Operation Cooperation)
- "Cooperative" (1989, from the film Private Detective, or Operation Cooperation)
- "Hello, America!" (1992, from the film Weather Is Good on Deribasovskaya, It Rains Again on Brighton Beach)
- "My Train has Left" (1992, from the film Weather Is Good on Deribasovskaya, It Rains Again on Brighton Beach)

== Filmography ==
Live action

- Absolutely Seriously (1961)
- Operation Y and Shurik's Other Adventures (1965)
- Kidnapping, Caucasian Style (1966)
- Man without a Passport (1966)
- The Formula of Rainbow (1967)
- The Diamond Arm (1968)
- The Red Tent (1969)
- The Twelve Chairs (1971)
- Commander of the Lucky 'Pike' (1972)
- The Land of Sannikov (1973)
- Ivan Vasilievich: Back to the Future (1973)
- Captain Nemo (1975)
- It Can't Be! (1975)
- The Throw, or Everything Started on Saturday (1976)
- Incognito from St. Petersburg (1977)
- The Woman who Sings (1978)
- 31 June (1978)
- The Orion Loop (1980)
- Borrowing Matchsticks (1980)
- Dusha (1981)
- Sportloto-82 (1982)
- Where is the Nophelet? (1987)
- She with a Broom, He in a Black Hat (1987)
- Island of Lost Ships (1987)
- Private Detective, or Operation Cooperation (1990)
- Weather Is Good on Deribasovskaya, It Rains Again on Brighton Beach (1992)
- Kidnapping, Caucasian Style! (2014, used music)

Cartoons

- Film, Film, Film (1968, together with Yevgeny Krylatov)
- Well, Just You Wait!, second episode (1970, together with Georgy Garanian)
- The Mystery of the Third Planet (1981)
