= Little Fugitive (1966 film) =

- Russian: Маленький беглец Japanese: 小さい逃亡者
- Directed by: Eduard Bocharov; Teinosuke Kinugasa
- Written by: Andrei Bitov; Emil Braginskiy; Hideo Oguni
- Produced by: Grigori Britikov; Masaichi Nagata
- Starring: Chiharu Inayoshi; Michiyo Yasuda; Hiroyuki Ôta; Machiko Kyô; Yuri Nikulin
- Cinematography: Pyotr Kataev; Kazuo Miyagawa; Aleksandr Rybin
- Edited by: Olga Katusheva; Toyo Suzuki
- Music by: Boris Karamyshev; Emin Khachaturyan
- Release date: 1966
- Countries: Soviet Union; Japan
- Languages: Russian; Japanese

Little Fugitive (Russian: Маленький беглец) is a 1966 film, co-produced by USSR and Japan, directed by Eduard Bocharov and Teinosuke Kinugasa.

== Plot ==
A young boy, named Ken Kawama, is being raised by an uncle (Nobuyuki Noda) without parents. The uncle, who had been a promising classical violinist in his youth, has given up on himself and is sinking into alcoholism. Ken spends his time in the streets of Tokyo, occasionally playing the violin, and dreaming of becoming a violinist, like his father, who he was told had died long ago. The uncle performs at bars at night, bringing Ken along, which is not entirely legal. One night, while intoxicated, the uncle tells Ken that his father is in fact alive, and is living and performing in Moscow. Ken consults his young friend, Michiko Sakuma, who also works in the streets illegally, selling flowers to passers-by. Michiko advises Ken to seek out information about Moscow and his father.

The Moscow Circus comes to town, Ken makes his way inside without a ticket, and, chased by the ushers, ends up in the dressing room of Yuri Nikulin, a famous and beloved clown (and film actor). Nikulin, unable to communicate with Ken due to the language barrier, assumes the boy wants to see the show. After the show, Nikulin gives Ken a gift of 7 Matryoshka dolls — nested Russian dolls of painted wood, which Ken supposes to possess magic powers, able to fulfill any wish.

Determined to reach Moscow and find his father, Ken sets out on his travels. He hitches a ride on a truck toward Kyoto, and then reaches Nakhodka Bay as a stowaway on a ship transporting the circus's equipment, although the performers had departed by plane. When he is discovered on the ship, contrary to expection — or due to a secret magic wish on a Matryoshka doll — he is not deported to Japan, but is allowed to continue toward Moscow by train. Unable to communicate with the locals verbally, occasionally getting his message across by drawing, he travels, meeting various mishaps and challenges, but advancing steadily westward by various means. Eventually he is placed on a plane to Moscow, which — unbeknownst to him — lands in Leningrad, due to inclement weather.

The passengers are given a free tour of the city, during which Ken leaves the group, and — believing he is in Moscow — sets out in search of his father. Seeing billboards of Nikulin's circus, Ken makes his way inside. Nikulin, astonished to see the boy again, brings him in front of the audience, who think he is part of the show. Ken tells his story in Japanese, and one audience member happens to be able to understand and translate. Together with Ken and Nikulin, they travel to Moscow, and at the Japanese embassy learn that Ken's father had died of an illness 5 years prior.

Ken stays in Moscow, and enters the conservatory to study the violin. A few years later, he travels to Japan as a soloist with the orchestra of Rudolf Barshai. After his story is presented on national television, Ken is reunited with Michiko and her mother. Ken's uncle, working as a cook at an orphanage, watches his nephew's performance on TV, overcome by shame and pride.

== Cast ==
- Chiharu Inayoshi as Ken Kawama as a boy
- Makiko Ishimaru as Michiko Sakuma as a girl
- Machiko Kyô as Yayoi Yamamura
- Yuri Nikulin as himself
- Jûkichi Uno as Nobuyuki Noda
- Ivan Ryzhov
- Inna Makarova
- Ken Utsui as Teacher Tabata
- Stanislav Chekan
- Eiji Funakoshi as Japanese man in Leningrad
- Lyubov Sokolova
- Michiyo Ookusu as Michiko Sakuma as a young woman
- Nikolay Grabbe
- Hiroyuki Ôta as Ken Kawama as a young man
- Viktor Chekmaryov
- Jun Fujimaki
- Eduard Bredun
- Mikiko Tsubouchi
- Yuriy Sarantsev
- Vladimir Yemelyanov
- Nikolay Smorchkov
- Taiji Tonoyama
- Tatyana Nikulina
- Tatyana Ainyukova
- Vladimir Bykov
- Yûzô Hayakawa
- Yoshirô Kitahara
- Reiji Kurihara
- Hiroko Machida
- Mikhail Shujdin
