= When the Cossacks Weep =

- Russian: Когда казаки плачут
- Directed by: Yevgeny Morgunov
- Written by: Yevgeny Morgunov; Mikhail Sholokhov
- Starring: Nikolay Gorlov; Irina Murzayeva; Georgiy Svetlani; Emma Tsesarskaya; Zoya Vasilkova; Tatyana Zabrodina
- Cinematography: Igor Lukshin
- Music by: Andrey Eshpay
- Release date: 1963
- Country: Soviet Union
- Language: Russian

When the Cossacks Weep (Russian: Когда казаки плачут) is a 1963 Soviet short film directed by Yevgeny Morgunov.

== Plot ==
The film takes place in 1926 on the Don. A group of Cossacks went for a walk, and when they returned, they found that their families had disappeared somewhere.

== Cast ==
- Nikolay Gorlov
- Irina Murzayeva as Praskovya
- Georgiy Svetlani as Sashko
- Emma Tsesarskaya
- Zoya Vasilkova
- Tatyana Zabrodina
