= Lyana =

- Russian: Ляна
- Directed by: Boris Barnet
- Written by: Boris Barnet; Liviu Corneanu; Valentin Ezhov
- Starring: Kyunna Ignatova; Aleksandr Shvorin; Muza Krepkogorskaya; Radner Muratov; Leonid Gayday; Eugeniu Ureche
- Cinematography: Iosif Martov
- Music by: Shiko Aranov
- Release date: 1955
- Running time: 78 minute
- Country: Soviet Union

Lyana (Russian: Ляна) is a 1955 Soviet musical comedy film directed by Boris Barnet.

== Plot ==
In the center of the plot is a beautiful percussionist and Komsomol Lyana, who with her friends goes to Chisinau to take part in an amateur art contest.

== Starring ==
- Kyunna Ignatova
- Aleksandr Shvorin
- Muza Krepkogorskaya
- Radner Muratov
- Leonid Gayday
- Eugeniu Ureche
- D. Lysenko
- Konstantin Konstantinov
- Nikolay Gorlov
