= Karandash =

Soviet clown

- Карандаш
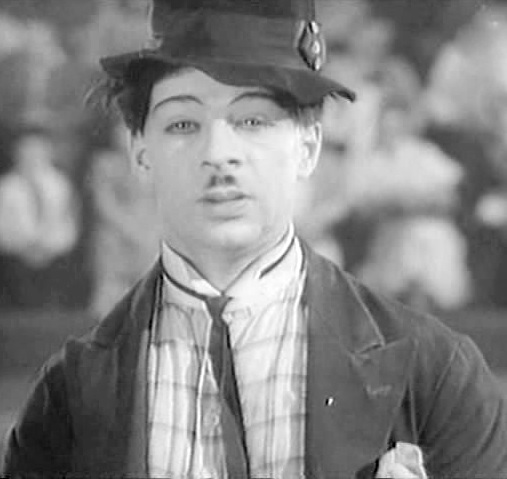
- Karandash in 1939
- Born: Mikhail Nikolayevich Rumyantsev; 10 December 1901 [O.S. 27 November] Saint Petersburg, Russian Empire
- Died: 31 March 1983 (aged 81); Moscow, Russian SFSR, Soviet Union
- Occupation: Clown

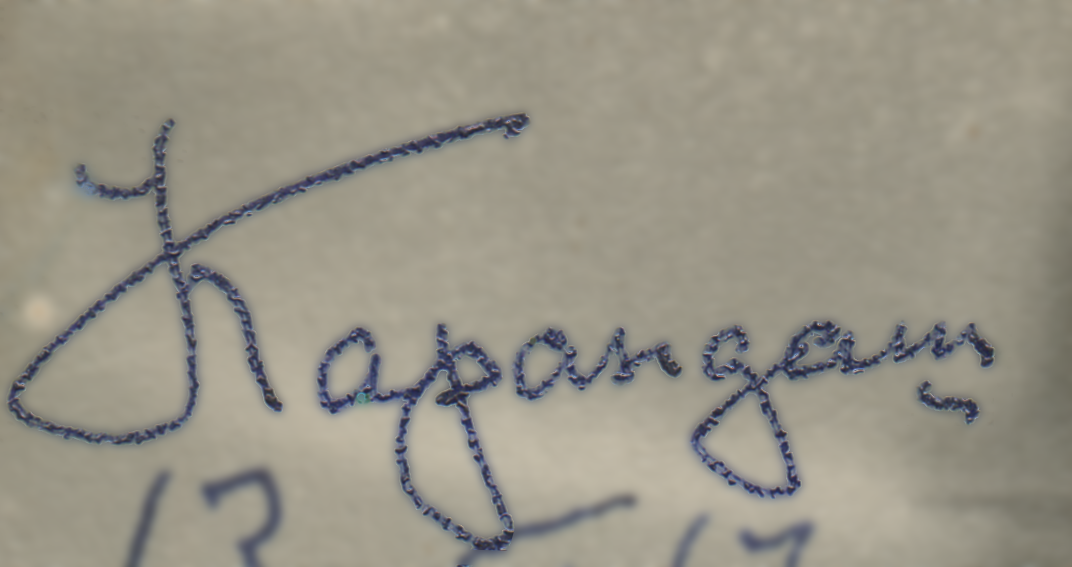
Signature of Karandash

Mikhail Nikolayevich Rumyantsev (Note: Russian: Михаил Николаевич Румянцев, romanized: Mikhail Nikolayevich Rumyantsev) (10 December 1901 [O.S. 27 November] – 31 March 1983), better known under his stage name Karandash (Note: Russian: Карандаш, romanized: Karandash, which means pencil) was a famous Soviet clown. He was a People's Artist of the USSR and a Hero of Socialist Labour, and was the teacher of the famous Russian clowns Oleg Popov and Yuri Nikulin.

== Family life ==
Rumyantsev was born in Saint Petersburg, and had two younger siblings, brother Kostya and sister Lena. His mother died when he was six.

Rumyantsev had at least two daughters.

== Career as clown ==
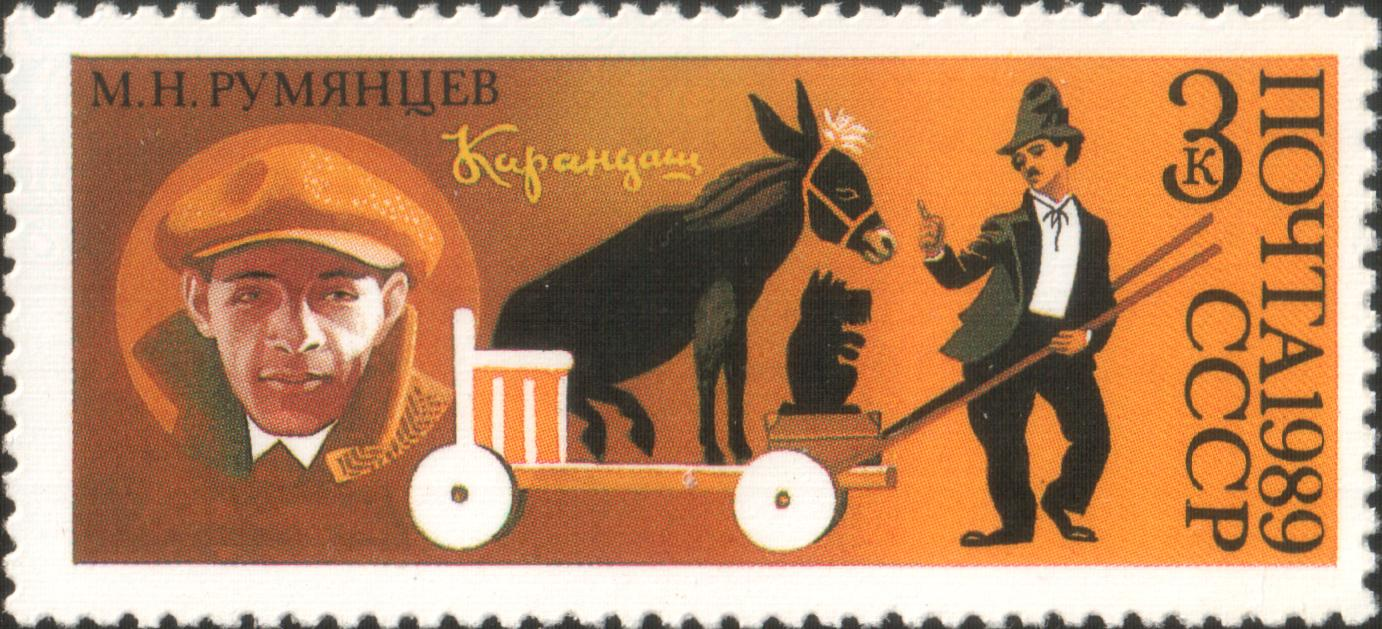
1989 stamp commemorating Karandash

Starting his career in the circus arena as the imitator of Charlie Chaplin, Mikhail Rumyantsev then abandoned it for, or rather, transformed that part into his would-be renowned image of Karandash always accompanied with his hallmark Scottish Terrier named Klyaksa (which means blot).

He enjoyed immense popularity with the Soviet audience and often gathered full houses all over the country. He had courage to ridicule such topics as religion, alcohol, fascism and even the Soviet regime.

Rumyantsev taught his profession to both Oleg Popov and Yuri Nikulin.

During World War II, Rumyantsev toured on frontiers and mocked fascist forces to raise soldiers’ morale.

In 1960, he toured South America with the Moscow Circus on Tsvetnoy Boulevard.

Altogether, Karandash had worked in the circus for 55 years, the last time he appeared in the arena was just two weeks prior to his death.

The Moscow Circus School was named after him.

== Literature ==
- Stites, Richard (1992). Russian Popular Culture: Entertainment and Society Since 1900. Cambridge: Cambridge University Press. p. 80. ISBN 0-521-36986-X.
