= The Prisoner of the Caucasus =

Prisoner of the Caucasus (also translated Captive in the Caucasus) may refer to:

- The Prisoner of the Caucasus (poem) (Кавказский пленник; translit. Kavkazskiy plennik), a poem by Alexander Pushkin first published in 1820-21
- The Prisoner of the Caucasus (opera), an 1883 opera by César Cui based on Pushkin's poem
- "The Prisoner of the Caucasus" (story), an 1872 novella by Leo Tolstoy
- Prisoner of the Mountains, a 1996 Russian film based on Tolstoy's novella
- The Prisoner of the Caucasus, a variant translation for Kidnapping, Caucasian Style (Кавказская пленница, или Новые приключения Шурика, translit. Kavkazskaya plennitsa, ili Novie priklucheniya Shurika), a 1967 Russian comedy film directed by Leonid Gaidai
