= Yuri Nikulin =

Soviet and Russian actor and clown (1921–1997)

- Юрий Никулин
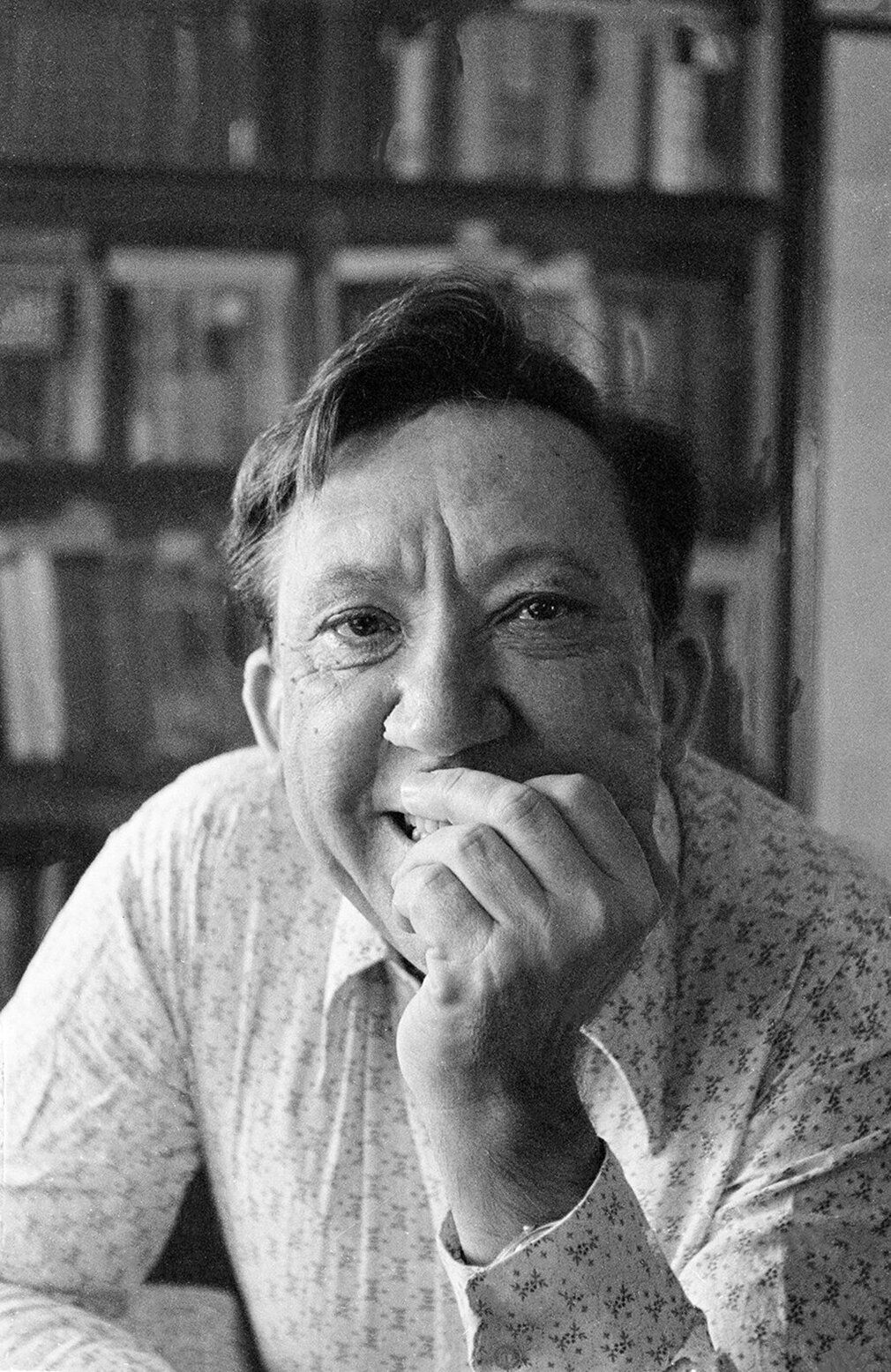
- Nikulin in 1977
- Born: 18 December 1921; Demidov, Smolensk Governorate, Russian SFSR
- Died: 21 August 1997 (aged 75); Moscow, Russia
- Resting place: Novodevichy Cemetery, Moscow
- Occupations: Actor, clown, ringmaster, singer
- Title: Hero of Socialist Labour (1990); People's Artist of the USSR (1973)
- Awards: Order "For Merit to the Fatherland", Order of Lenin, Order of the Patriotic War, Order of the Red Banner of Labour, Order of the Badge of Honour, Medal "For Courage", Medal "For Labour Valour", Jubilee Medal "In Commemoration of the 100th Anniversary of the Birth of Vladimir Ilyich Lenin", Medal "For the Defence of Leningrad", Medal "For the Victory over Germany in the Great Patriotic War 1941–1945", Jubilee Medal "Twenty Years of Victory in the Great Patriotic War 1941–1945", Jubilee Medal "Thirty Years of Victory in the Great Patriotic War 1941–1945", Jubilee Medal "Forty Years of Victory in the Great Patriotic War 1941–1945", Medal "Veteran of Labour", Jubilee Medal "50 Years of the Armed Forces of the USSR", Jubilee Medal "60 Years of the Armed Forces of the USSR", Jubilee Medal "70 Years of the Armed Forces of the USSR", Medal "In Commemoration of the 250th Anniversary of Leningrad", Jubilee Medal "50 Years of Victory in the Great Patriotic War 1941–1945", Medal of Zhukov, Vasilyev Brothers State Prize of the RSFSR

Yuri Vladimirovich Nikulin (Russian: Юрий Владимирович Никулин; 18 December 1921 – 21 August 1997) was a Soviet and Russian actor and clown who starred in many popular films. He is best known for his roles in Leonid Gaidai's comedies, such as The Diamond Arm and Kidnapping, Caucasian Style, although he occasionally starred in dramatic roles and performed in the Moscow Circus.

He was awarded the title of People's Artist of the USSR in 1973 and Hero of Socialist Labour in 1990. He also received a number of state awards, including the prestigious Order of Lenin, which he received twice in his lifetime.

== Biography ==
=== Early years ===
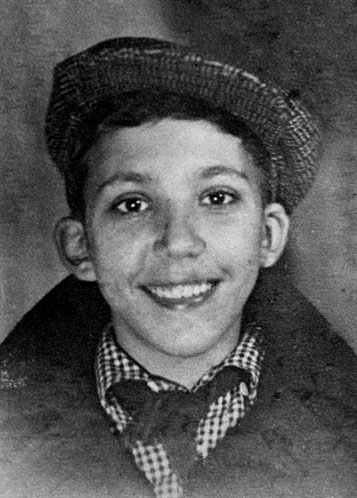
Nikulin in 1930s

Nikulin was born just after the end of the Russian civil war, in Demidov, Smolensk Oblast. His father Vladimir Andreyevich was a critic, an author of satirical plays and a director in Demidov's local drama theatre. Yuri’s mother Lidiya was an actress there. They got married in the early 1920s and in 1925 moved to Moscow.

In Moscow, Yuri entered a prestigious School No. 16 and soon received from the school’s pedologist an unfavorable characteristic of "a child with limited abilities". His father, insulted, came to the school and confronted the teacher, proving that Yuri was a bright kid. Vladimir Nikulin led a drama club in the school. They staged contemporary playwrights and Yuri was a passionate artist there. In the eighth grade he was transferred to the school No. 346, which was considered "a mediocre one". He graduated in 1939 and in a few months was called up for military duty.

=== World War II ===
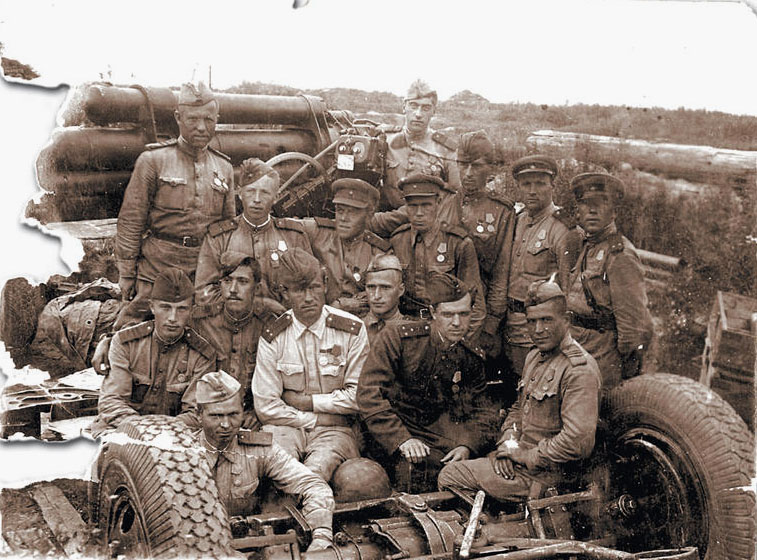
Yuri (second on the left, 1 row) with comrades, 1943-1944

Nikulin was drafted to the Red Army on 18 November 1939, at the age of 17. In December he was sent to the Winter War with Finland in an anti-aircraft battery near Sestroretsk. During in the fighting at the Mannerheim Line, he served as a wireman and once was ordered to lay 2 km of wire from reels on a backpack in -30 °C weather. On that night he was so exhausted after the mission that he fell asleep in the snow, fortunately rescued by the border patrol. He suffered from severe frostbite and for the rest of his life his legs froze easily. Upon recovery he returned to his division.

In 1941, he was waiting for demobilization when the German invasion of the Soviet Union began. In 1942, his battery was located near the besieged Leningrad. In 1944 he again escaped death by pure luck – a few seconds after he left a trench shelter it was hit by a heavy artillery missile. In the same year he was by his commander's mistake sent to set wire in an occupied village and wasn’t killed by German soldiers only by sheer luck. Upon the end of the war he was dismissed from the army only in 1946.

=== Circus career ===
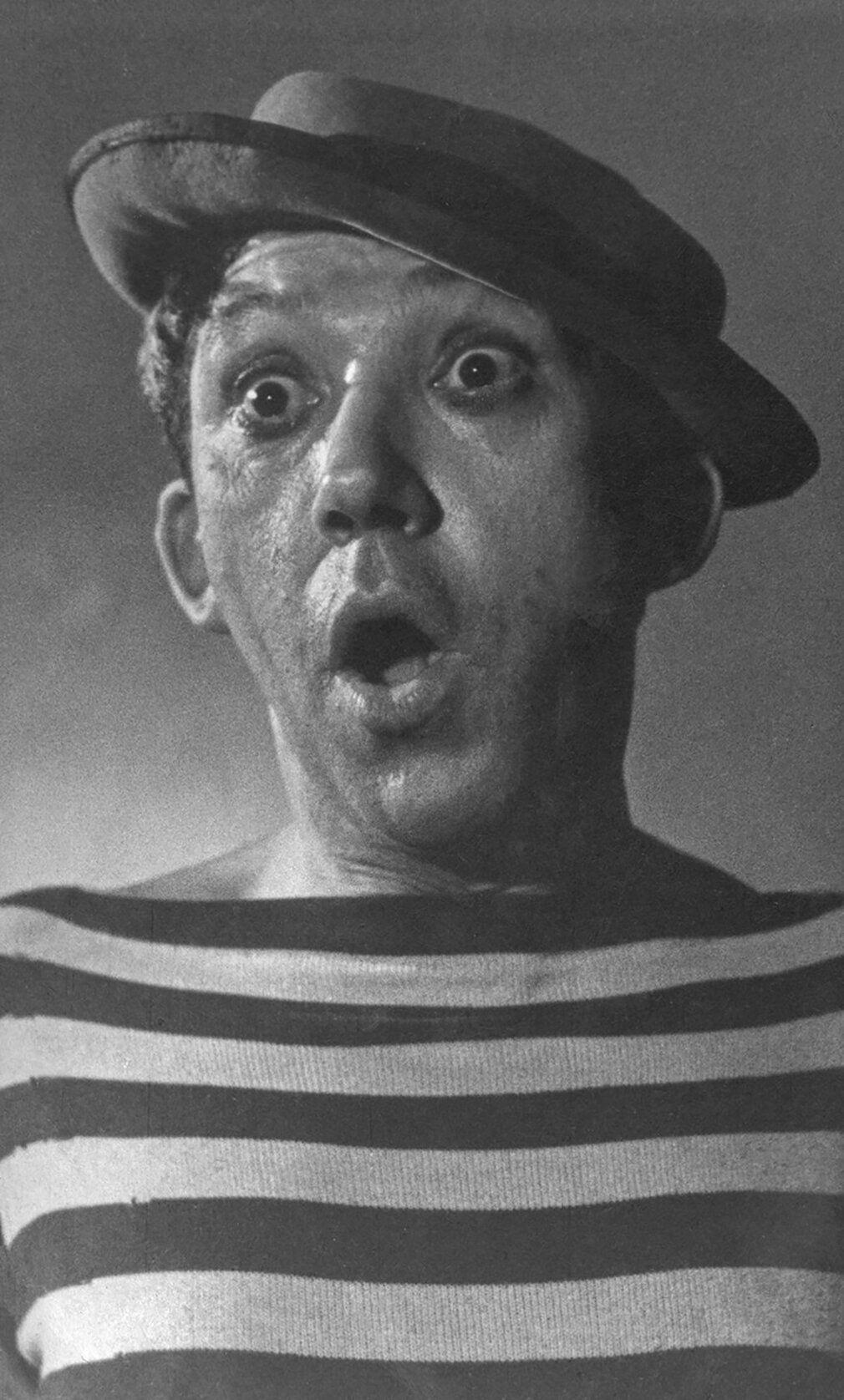
Nikulin performing at the circus in 1960s

Nikulin first tried himself as a comedian in 1944 when a political officer in his battalion, impressed by his repertoire of jokes, ordered him to organize entertainment for the division, which he did with resounding success. Encouraged, once the war ended, Nikulin unsuccessfully tried to enter VGIK, Russian Institute of Theatre Arts, Mikhail Shchepkin Higher Theatre School. Finally he was accepted into Noginsk theatre school, but soon changed his mind and entered the Moscow Сircus school.

Nikulin's style and precise delivery, as well as his mastery of timing and his hilarious masks made him an outstanding comedian. He started as an assistant of Karandash, then the most famous clown in the USSR. In circus school Nikulin met Mikhail Shuidin. They formed a clown duo and performed together throughout their whole careers.

In the ring, Nikulin played a phlegmatic, slow and unsmiling person, in the West he was compared to Buster Keaton and Charlie Chaplin. Rich in mimicry, doleful of expression, Nikulin was hailed as "a brainy clown" outside Russia.

Nikulin, affectionately called "Uncle Yura" by Russian children, relied mainly upon his wits to earn his place in history as one of the best clowns of the 20th century. He stopped performing as a clown at 60, explaining that "a clown shouldn’t be gray, it looks pathetic".

=== Cinema ===
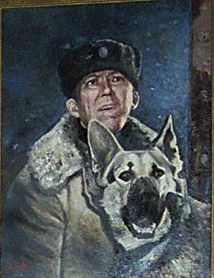
Nikulin in Come Here, Mukhtar!, 1965

His screen debut came in 1958 with the film The Girl with the Guitar. He appeared in almost a dozen major features, mainly in the 1960s and 1970s, and achieved great success with short films directed by Leonid Gaidai." The first two works with Gaidai, Dog Barbos and the Unusual Cross and later Moonshiners (Russian: Samogonshchiki or The Moonshine Makers, 1961), were also where Nikulin was featured as a character named Fool in The Three Stooges-like trio of Coward, Fool, and Pro, along with Georgy Vitsin as Coward and Yevgeny Morgunov as Pro. In former Soviet republics he is particularly well known for his role in popular film series about the criminal trio. The series included such films as Operation Y and Shurik's Other Adventures and Kidnapping, Caucasian Style.

His most popular films include the comedies The Diamond Arm, The Twelve Chairs, Grandads–Robbers. His dramatic talent revealed itself in tragic roles in Andrei Tarkovsky's Andrei Rublev and several films on World War II themes (Sergei Bondarchuk's They Fought for Their Country, Aleksei German’s Twenty Days Without War).

=== Family ===
In 1949, Nikulin met his future spouse, Tatiana Pokroskaya, an equestrian and a student of Timiryazev Agricultural Academy. Tatiana brought to the circus a dwarf horse, requested by Karandash. During the rehearsal that day Tatiana witnessed Yuri get run over by a horse, suffer a concussion, a fractured clavicle and almost lose his eye. Tatiana visited him in the hospital, and in six months they were married. Since then she started working in circus, participated in many of his plays and traveled with Nikulin and Shuidin. Tatiana also plays minor roles in several of Nikulin’s films.

=== Directorship in Tsvetnoy ===
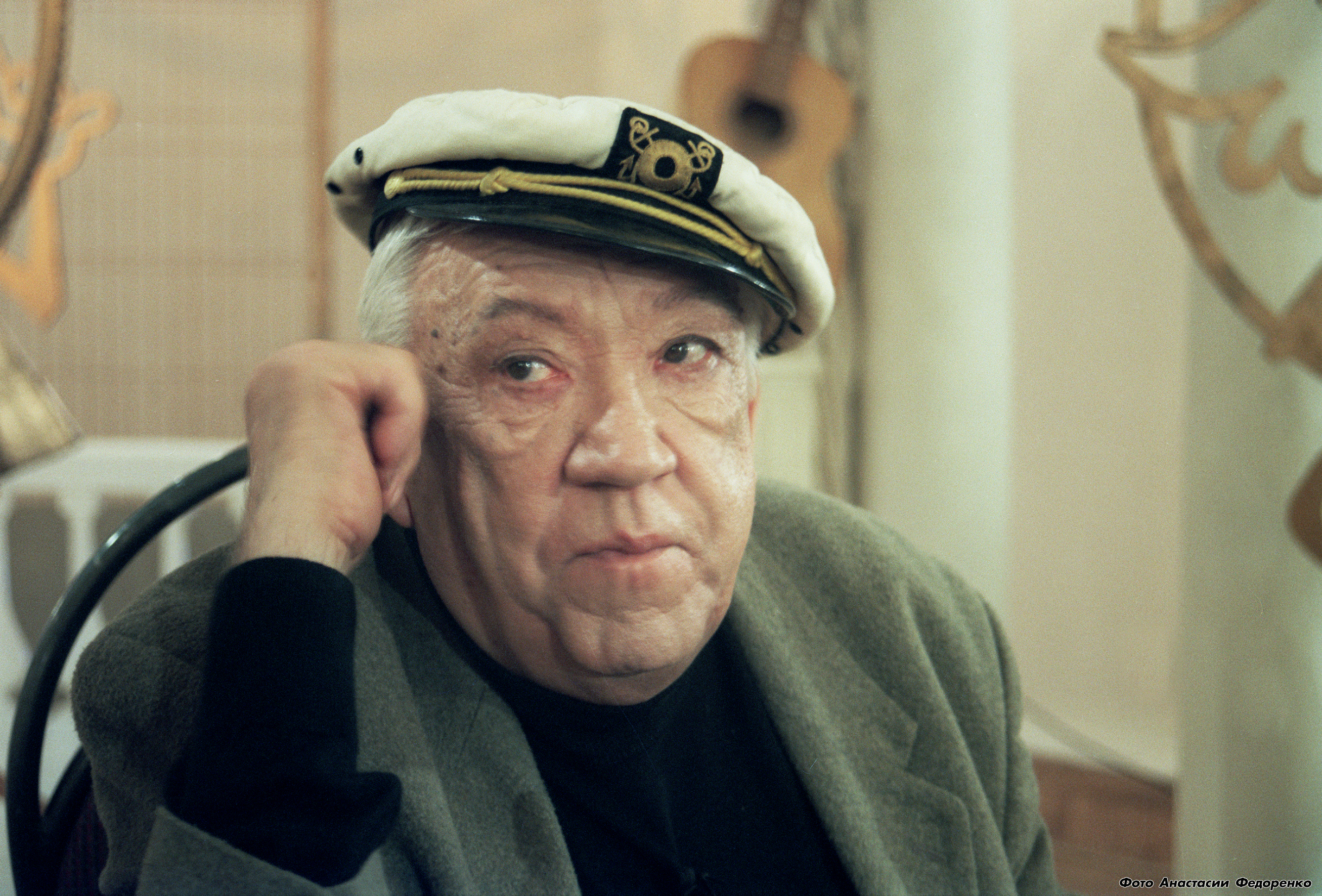
Nikulin in the 1990s

Nikulin was remembered as a person of boundless kindness. On a director’s post he rebuilt the Old Circus and established a foundation to help retired circus artists and performers.

Yuri Nikulin died on 21 August 1997 and was buried in Novodevichy Cemetery in Moscow. He was succeeded in his office at the Moscow Circus on Tsvetnoy Boulevard by his son, Maxim. After Nikulin’s death the Old Circus on Tsvetnoy Boulevard was renamed in his honor. A bronze monument to Nikulin was placed in front of the circus.

== Death ==
At the end of July 1997, Yuri Vladimirovich felt pain behind his sternum and went to the Center for Endosurgery and Lithotripsy (CELT). The situation was complicated by the fact that Nikulin had diabetes mellitus and was still suffering from the aftereffects of tuberculosis he had contracted during the war. On August 5, he underwent an angioplasty procedure, during which his heart stopped, though it was later restarted. After that, however, he fell into a coma, in which he remained for sixteen days until his death.

He died in Moscow on August 21, 1997, in his 76th year, due to complications following heart surgery. A farewell ceremony for the artist was held on August 25, 1997, at the Moscow Circus on Tsvetnoy Boulevard. He was buried at Novodevichy Cemetery.

== Filmography ==
Year	English title	Original title	Role	Notes
1958	A Girl with Guitar	Девушка с гитарой	Fireworker	
1959	The Unamenables	Неподдающиеся	Vasily Klyachkin	
1960	Yasha Toporkov		Prosha	
1960	Dead Souls	Мёртвые души	Waiter	Uncredited
1961	My Friend, Kolka!	Друг мой, Колька!	Vasia the driver	
1961	Nowhere Man	Человек ниоткуда	Policeman	
1961	Dog Barbos and Unusual Cross	Пёс Барбос и необычный кросс	Fool	Short; a part of almanac Absolutely Seriously
1962	Moonshiners	Самогонщики	Fool	Short
1962	When the Trees Were Tall	Когда деревья были большими	Kuzma Kuzmich Iordanov	
1962	Molodo-zeleno	Молодо-зелено	Nikolay, chauffeur	
1963	Bez strakha i upryoka			
1963	Strictly Business	Деловые люди	Burglar	(segment "Makes the Whole World Kin")
1964	Big Fitil	Большой фитиль	Petya-Petushok the burglar	
1965	Come Here, Mukhtar!	Ко мне, Мухтар!	Police lieutenant Glazychev	
1965	Give Me a Book of Complaints	Дайте жалобную книгу	Salesman	
1965	Fantazyory			
1965	Operation Y and Shurik's Other Adventures	Операция «Ы» и другие приключения Шурика	Fool	(segment "Operatsiya Y")
1966	Kidnapping, Caucasian Style	Кавказская пленница, или Новые приключения Шурика	Fool	
1966	Andrei Rublev	Андрей Рублёв	Patrikei	
1966	Little Fugitive	Маленький беглец	Clown Nikulin	cameo
1967	Seven Old Men and a Girl	Семь стариков и одна девушка	Fool	
1969	Newbie	Новенькая	Yevgeniy Ivanovich	
1969	The Diamond Arm	Бриллиантовая рука	Semyon Semyonovich Gorbunkov	
1970	Deniska's Tales	Денискины рассказы	Deniska's neighbor	
1971	The Twelve Chairs	12 стульев	Tikhon the janitor	
1972	Grandads-Robbers	Старики-разбойники	Nikolay Myachikov	
1972	Telegram	Телеграмма	Fyodor Fyodorovich	
1972	Point, Point, Comma...	Точка, точка, запятая…	Zhiltsov's father	
1975	They Fought for Their Country	Они сражались за Родину	private Nekrasov	
1976	Travka's Adventures	Приключения Травки		
1977	Twenty Days Without War	Двадцать дней без войны	Major Lopatin	
1977	Bobik Visiting Barbos	Бобик в гостях у Барбоса	Bobik / grandfather	Short, Voice
1983	I Don't Want To Be Adult	Не хочу быть взрослым	clown on TV	
1983	Yeralash № 38	Ералаш	uncle Yura	
1984	Scarecrow	Чучело	Nikolai Bessoltsev, grandfather	
1991	Captain Crocus	Капитан Крокус	Author	(introduction; final film role)

== Awards and honors ==
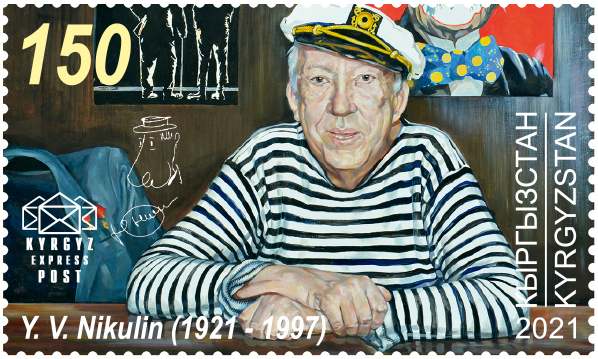
Nikulin on a 2021 stamp of Kyrgyzstan

- Hero of Socialist Labour (1990)
- Order "For Merit to the Fatherland", 3rd class (1996)
- Two Orders of Lenin (1980, 1990)
- Order of the Patriotic War, 2nd class (1985)
- Order of the Red Banner of Labour (1986)
- Order of the Badge of Honour (1967)
- Medal "For Courage" (1945)
- Medal of Zhukov
- Medal "For Labour Valour" (1958)
- Medal "For the Defence of Leningrad" (1943)
- Medal "For the Victory over Germany in the Great Patriotic War 1941–1945"
- Honored Artist of the RSFSR (1963)
- People's Artist of the RSFSR (1969)
- People's Artist of the USSR (1973)
- Vasilyev Brothers State Prize of the RSFSR (1970)

On 18 December 2011, Google celebrated his 90th birthday with a Google Doodle.

== Literature ==
- Razzakov, Fyodor (2016). Юрий Никулин. Смешное и трагическое (in Russian). Algoritm. ISBN 978-5-906880-45-1.
- Glushkova, V. G. (2011). Смоленская земля [Smolensk Land] (in Russian). Veche. ISBN 978-5-9533-4792-1.
- Nikulin, Yuri (2009). Почти серьёзно... [Seriously. Almost...] (in Russian). Zebra-E. ISBN 978-5-1705-5586-4.
- Siemens, Elena (2011). Theatre in Passing: A Moscow Photo-Diary. Chicago: Chicago Press. ISBN 978-1-84150-374-5.
