= Coward, Fool, and Pro =

Soviet comedy trio of bumbling bad guys

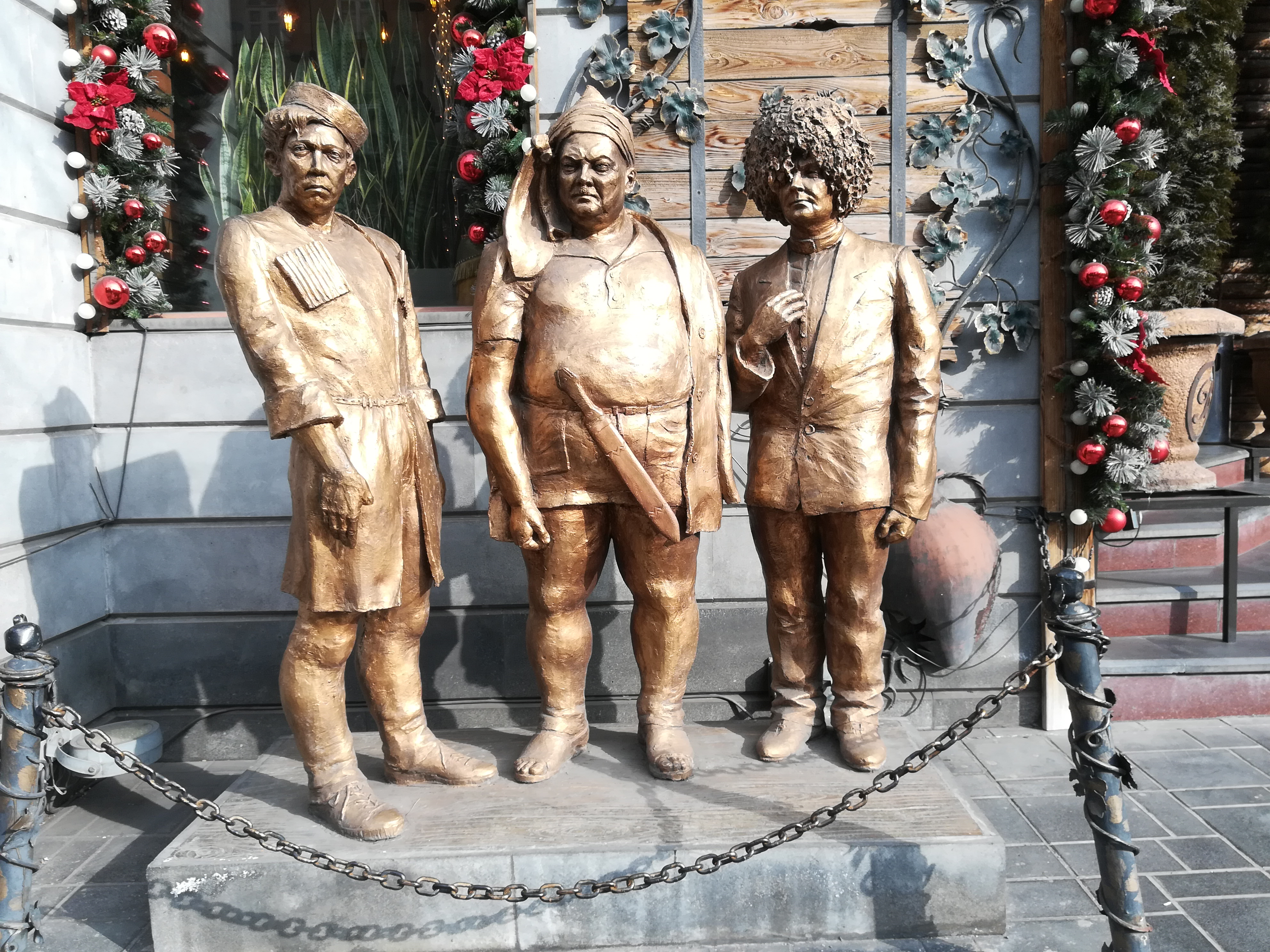
A Fool, Pro, and Coward monument, in stereotyped costumes of the Caucasus Mountains peoples, Yerevan, Armenia. Left to right: Nikulin, Morgunov, Vitsin

Coward, Fool, and Pro (Russian: Трус, Балбес и Бывалый, Trus, Balbes, i Byvaly) are a trio of comical characters, petty criminals from Soviet cinema, first appeared in the films of Leonid Gaidai. They were played accordingly, "Coward": Georgy Vitsin, "Fool": Yuri Nikulin, "Pro": Yevgeny Morgunov. Initially appearing in Gaidai's satirical shorts, they gained all-Union popularity after the films Operation Y and Shurik's Other Adventures and Kidnapping, Caucasian Style, (further Shurik's New Adventures).

The exact moment of the creation of the trio is documented in the Mosfilm minutes: December 27, 1960, 17:30. At this moment the Mosfilm management approved the actors for their first common film, Dog Barbos and Unusual Cross.

In Moscow there is the Three Actors' Museum dedicated to them.

== Filmography ==
- 1961: Dog Barbos and Unusual Cross
- 1961: Moonshiners
- 1965: Give Me a Book of Complaints (episodic)
- 1965: Operation Y and Shurik's Other Adventures, segment "Operation Y"
- 1966: ru:Сказки русского леса
- 1967: Kidnapping, Caucasian Style - the last film in which the trio were the main characters
- 1968: Seven Old Men and a Girl (episodic)
- 1969: The Bremen Town Musicians (animated musical) and the sequels:
  - On the Trail of the Bremen Town Musicians
  - The New Bremen Town Musicians
- 1980: ru:Комедия давно минувших дней (crossover comedy)
- 1982: ru:Происшествие в стране Мульти-Пульти (crosover animated musical)
- 1991: Kapitan Krokus; in this Ukrainian children's film the trio is played by Ukrainian actors, however it contains a cameo appearance of Yuri Nikulin, his last cinema role.
- 2014: Kidnapping, Caucasian Style!, a remake

== See also ==
- Olsen Gang, and the related Jönssonligan
- The Three Stooges
