= Dangerous for Your Life! =

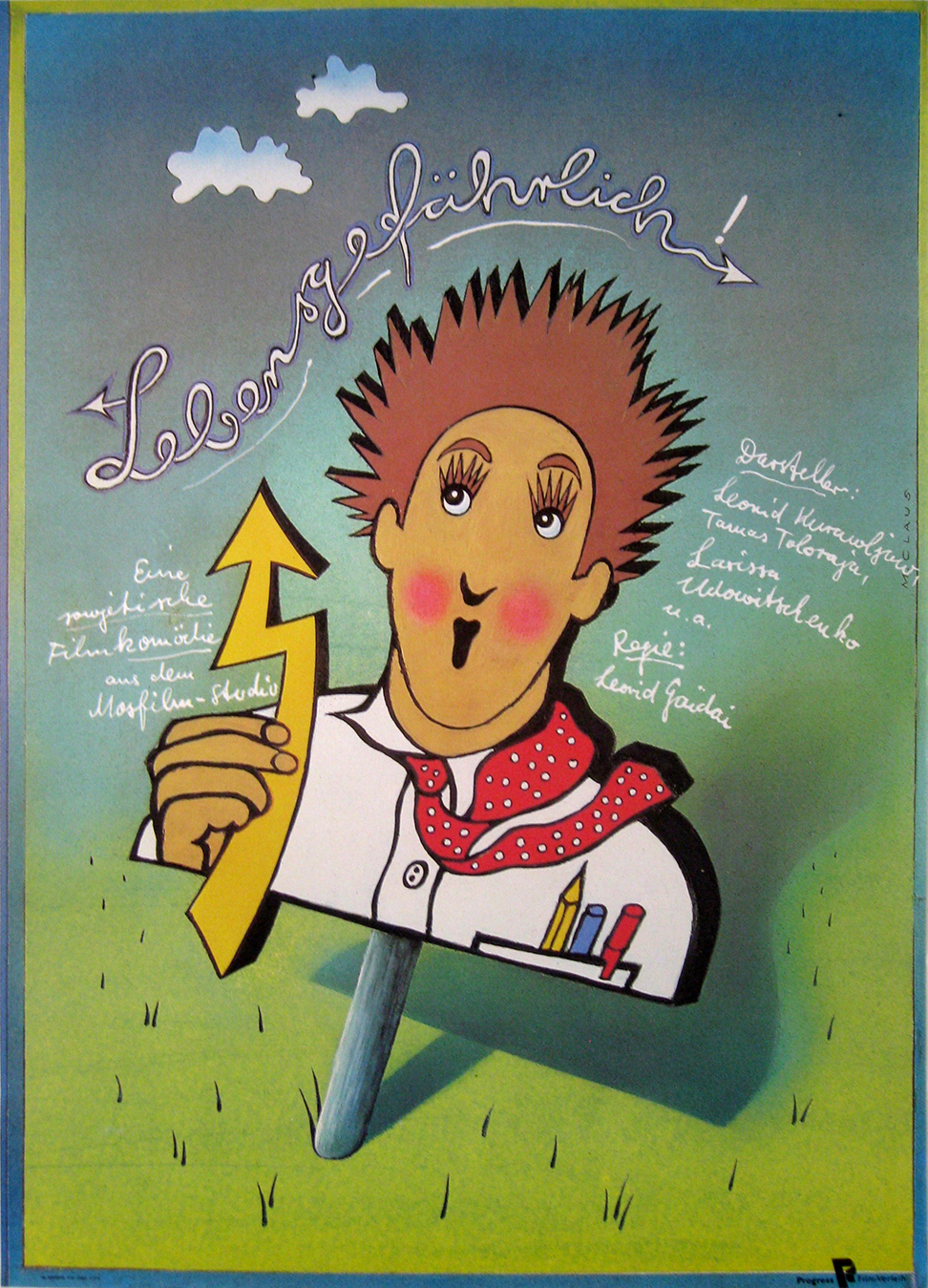
- Poster by Matthias Claus
- Directed by: Leonid Gaidai
- Written by: Roman Furman (born 17.06.1936); Oleg Kolesnikov; Leonid Gaidai
- Starring: Leonid Kuravlyov; Georgy Vitsin; Larisa Udovichenko; Vladimir Nosik; Tatyana Kravchenko; Tamaz Toloraya
- Music by: Maksim Dunayevsky
- Production company: Mosfilm
- Release date: June 10, 1985
- Running time: 88 min
- Country: Soviet Union
- Language: Russian

Dangerous for Your Life! (Russian: Опасно для жизни!, romanized: Opasno dlya zizni!) is a 1985 Soviet adventure comedy film directed by Leonid Gaidai.

== Plot ==
Spartak Molodtsov (Leonid Kuravlyov) is a man who can not leave well enough alone. Because of this he always gets into trouble. So one morning he finds a broken high tension wire and is late for work which nearly derails the reception of visitors because his new bureaucrat-chief (Borislav Brondukov) is afraid to make decisions without him.

Molodtsov at his post meets an alcoholic of the name of Chokolov (Georgy Vitsin) and Tamara – a female van driver who transports ice cream (Tatyana Kravchenko). A visitor of the facility, Comrade Kipiani (Tamaz Toloraya), eventually finds him there, on his post, near the wire. The finale of the film is fairly unexpected.

== Cast ==
- Leonid Kuravlyov (Spartak Ivanovich Molodtsov)
- Georgy Vitsin (Alexander Chokolov)
- Larisa Udovichenko (Katerina Ivanovna)
- Vladimir Nosik (Maxim Dmitriev)
- Tatyana Kravchenko (Tamara)
- Tamaz Toloraya (born 02.03.1951 - died 09.11.2004) (Vano Kipiani)
- Boryslav Brondukov (Andrey Pavlovich Peredelkin)
- Sergey Filippov (gentle visitor)
- Nina Grebeshkova (Zinaida Petrovna)
- Mikhail Kokshenov (lieutenant Rokotov)
- Nina Maslova (lady with the Dog)
- Vera Ivleva (born 18.09.1943 - died 08.01.1999 (barmaid)
- Alexander Pyatkov (a man in a tracksuit and with an ax)

== Production ==
The movie was filmed in the cities of Chernivtsi and Kamianets-Podilskyi. The institution in which the main character worked was the Chernivtsi Oblast Council building. Other filming locations in Chernivtsi include the tower in Central Square, Chernivtsi City Hall, Theater Square and University Street.
