= Dog Barbos and Unusual Cross =

- Directed by: Leonid Gaidai
- Written by: Leonid Gaidai
- Produced by: Leonid Gaidai
- Starring: Yuri Nikulin; Georgy Vitsin; Yevgeny Morgunov
- Cinematography: Konstantin Brovin
- Music by: Nikita Bogoslovsky
- Production company: Mosfilm
- Release date: 1961
- Running time: 10 min.
- Country: Soviet Union
- Language: Russian

Dog Barbos and Unusual Cross (Russian: Пёс Барбос и необычный кросс, romanized: Pyos Barbos i neobychnij kross) is a 1961 Soviet short crime comedy film directed by Leonid Gaidai.

== Plot ==
A trio of petty criminals, known as Coward, Fool, and Pro, go "fishing". Not wanting to sit on the beach with a fishing rod and wait patiently for a fish to bite, they decide to stun the fish using dynamite. After they drop a stick of dynamite into the river, their dog, Barbos, removes the dynamite from the water and chases after the men. The trio escape up a tall tree, but Barbos drops the dynamite at the foot of the tree and runs away. The dynamite explodes, and the men are knocked senseless, with their clothes in tatters.

== Cast ==
- Yuri Nikulin – The Fool
- Georgy Vitsin – The Coward
- Yevgeny Morgunov – The Pro
- Georgy Millyar – Water-bailiff (uncredited)
- Leonid Gaidai – Bear in a tent (deleted scene)
- Dog Bryokh – Dog Barbos

== Filming ==
Filming took place in the vicinity of the village of Snegiri in the Istrinsky District, Moscow Oblast, on the banks of the Istra River, and the scenes with the explosion of dynamite and the burning tree were shot near the summer dacha of the singer Ivan Kozlovsky in a nearby village.

The filmed material in total was enough for a half-hour, but the director Leonid Gaidai reduced it to a ten minutes running time and removed a lot of stunt scenes that were later used in Moonshiners.

== Awards ==
Nominated for Short Film Palme d'Or at the 1961 Cannes Film Festival.

== See also ==
- The Loaded Dog
