= Georgy Vitsin =

Soviet and Russian stage and film actor (1917–2001)

- Георгий Вицин
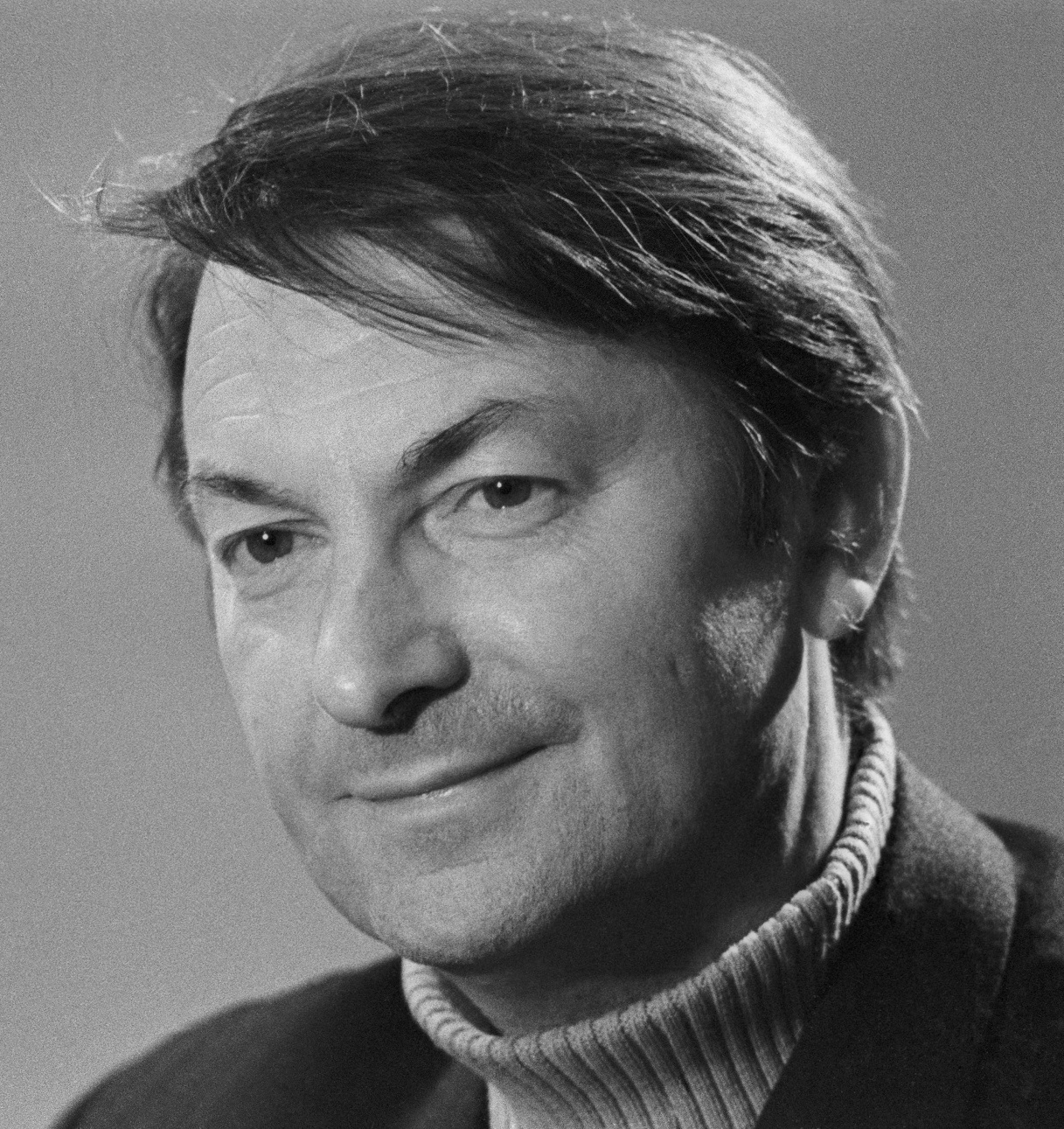
- Vitsin in 1971
- Born: 18 April 1917; Terijoki, Vyborg Governorate, Grand Duchy of Finland, Russian Empire
- Died: 22 October 2001 (aged 84); Moscow, Russia
- Resting place: Vagankovo Cemetery
- Occupation: Actor
- Title: People's Artist of the USSR (1990)

Georgy Mikhailovich Vitsin (Russian: Георгий Михайлович Вицин; 18 April 1917 – 22 October 2001) was a Soviet and Russian stage and film actor. People's Artist of the USSR (1990).

== Biography ==
Vitsin was born in Zelenogorsk, Saint Petersburg in 1917 (Soviet documents list him as having been born in Petrograd — now Saint Petersburg). He enjoyed a long acting career and continued performing until close to the end of his life. Apart from playing with Yuri Nikulin and Yevgeny Morgunov, he appeared in dozens of films that earned him the adoration of millions.

Modest and sympathetic characters played by Vitsin evoked kindly feelings of viewers. At the same time, the actor played in detective, historical and lyrical feature films.

His first film roles date to the 1940s. He gained nationwide popularity in the former Soviet Union with the emergence of a series of 1960s comedies by director Leonid Gaidai. He played the role of the Coward among a trio Coward, Fool, and Pro of colorful, scheming characters in such Gaidai movies as Moonshiners (1962), Operation Y and Shurik's Other Adventures (1965), and Kidnapping, Caucasian Style (1967). The last two subsequently beat the Soviet all-time record of ticket sales. The trio of actors, including the late Yuri Nikulin and Yevgeny Morgunov, was "the most popular ensemble in the history of the national cinema." In 1990, he was awarded the top artistic title of the Soviet era, that of People's Artist of the USSR.

Although Vitsin played many characters during his career, he never had a leading role. His colleagues Yuri Nikulin and Georgy Vitsin Morgunov reportedly spoke positively about his acting talent.

According to film director Nikita Mikhalkov, Vitsin "was one of those rare people and actors whom upon meeting, you immediately feel as if they must know just as much about you as you know about them." According to Mikhalkov, Vitsin was also rare in that his popularity did not affect his personality. He was modest to the point that even in the years leading up to his death, when his financial circumstances were abysmal, he never asked for help. Russian media reported that Vitsin had declined into alcoholism and vagrancy but these reports were false.

During the last seven years of his life, Georgy Vitsin did not act in films and appeared only in comic concerts of the Theatre of Film Actor.

He died on 22 October 2001 at 4:30 p.m. He was buried at Vagankovo Cemetery, Moscow.

A monument to Georgy Vitsin was established in Zelenogorsk in 2008, marking the town's 460th jubilee and the 90th anniversary since the actor's birthday.

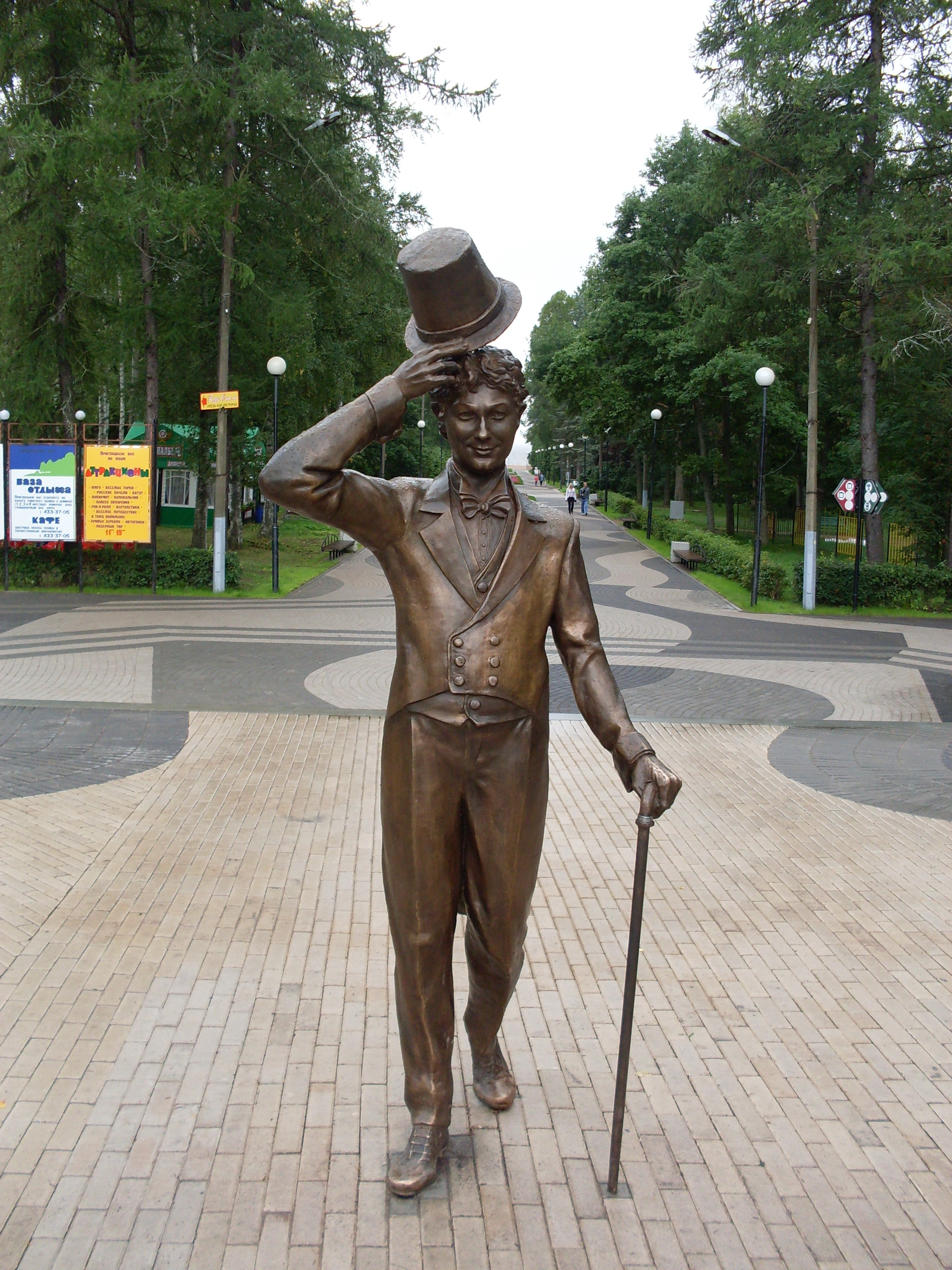
Monument to Vitsin in Zelenogorsk

== Selected filmography ==
=== Film ===
1. 1937: Bespridannitsa
2. 1944: Ivan the Terrible — oprichnik
3. 1945: Hello Moscow! — railwayman
4. 1946: The Great Glinka — spectator
5. 1952: Composer Glinka — Nikolai Gogol
6. 1953: Belinsky — Nikolai Gogol
7. 1954: The Boys from Leningrad — Vasia Vesnushkin
8. 1955: Twelfth Night — sir Andrew
9. 1956: Maxim Perepelitsa — grandpa Musiy
10. 1956: The Mexican — Billy Carthey
11. 1956: Murder on Dante Street — Pitu
12. 1957: Poet — (uncredited)
13. 1957: Don Quixote — Sanson Carrasco
14. 1957: She Loves You — Kostya Kanareykin
15. 1957: Wrestler and a clown — Enrico
16. 1958: New attraction — Semion Iljich
17. 1958: A Groom from the Other World — Pyotr Petrovich Fikusov
18. 1958: A Girl with a Guitar
19. 1959: Ottsy i deti — Sitnikov
20. 1959: I Was a Satellite of the Sun — Uchyonyy
21. 1959: Vasily Surikov — Ilya Repin
22. 1959: Kak possorilis Ivan Ivanovich s Ivanom Nikiforovichem — Gogol
23. 1960: Tri rasskaza Chekhova — Degtyaryov (segment "A Vengeance")
24. 1961: Dog Barbos and Unusual Cross (Short) — Coward
25. 1961: End of old Beryozovka — Geometry teacher
26. 1961: Moonshiners — Coward (segment "Pyos Barbos i neobychainy kross")
27. 1962: Artist from Kokhanivka — Grandfather Kuzma
28. 1962: The Way to the pier — intellectual in the sobering-up station
29. 1962: Colleagues
30. 1963: Molchat tolko statui — Jacques Meslier
31. 1963: Strictly Business — avantyurist Sam (segment "The Ransom of Red Chief")
32. 1963: Kain XVIII — Freelance Hangman
33. 1963: The first trolleybus — drunk man
34. 1963: Blind Bird — train passenger
35. 1963: Short stories
36. 1964: A Tale of Lost Times — evil wizard Andrew
37. 1964: Spring chores — uncle Pudya
38. 1965: Balzaminov's Marriage — Misha Balzaminov
39. 1965: Give Me a Book of Complaints — Zaveduyushchiy otdelom
40. 1965: Zaychik — assistant director
41. 1965: Operation Y and Other Adventures of Shurik — The Coward (segment "Operatsiya Y")
42. 1965: Road to the sea
43. 1966: Byvayet i tak
44. 1966: Udivitelnaya istoriya, pokhozhaya na skazki
45. 1966: Podi tuda, ne znayu kuda — Narrator
46. 1966: Who invented the wheel? — Uncle
47. 1966: The Formula of the Rainbow — Director of the toy factory
48. 1966: Kidnapping, Caucasian Style — Coward
49. 1967: Seven Old Men and One Girl — Coward
50. 1968: Tatyanin den — Man Offering New Chronology
51. 1968: Save the drowning — Militia Precinct Chief
52. 1968: An Old, Old Tale — Dobryy Bolshebnik
53. 1969: The Diamond Arm — Drunk Man
54. 1969: Golfstrim — Igor's Father
55. 1969: In the thirteenth hour of the night — Ovinny
56. 1969: Pub "13 Chairs" (TV show) — pan Cypa
57. 1970: Step off the roof — englishman
58. 1970: Guardian — Tebenkov
59. 1970: As we were looking Tishka — Petty Officer Stepanov
60. 1971: Kak my iskali Tishku
61. 1971: The Twelve Chairs — fitter Mechnikov
62. 1971: The Shadow — doctor
63. 1971: Gentlemen of Fortune — Gavrila Sheremetev (Sad Sack)
64. 1971: Spring tale (TV Movie) — Tsar Berendey
65. 1972: The mortal enemy — Yegor
66. 1972: Tobacco Captain (TV Movie) — cook
67. 1973: Incorrigible Liar — Alexei Ivanovich Tyutyurin
68. 1973: The Sannikov Land — Ignaty
69. 1973: Chipollino — lawer Vetch
70. 1973: Have you ever loved?
71. 1974: Tsarevich Prosha — «King Katorz IX»
72. 1974: North Rhapsody — seller
73. 1974: Honey boy — Macintosh
74. 1974: My destiny (Short) — drunk man
75. 1975: Car, Violin and the Dog Klyaksa — Banjo / Guitar
76. 1975: The big attraction — Gankin
77. 1975: It Can't Be! — Papanya nevesty
78. 1975: Finist, the brave Falcon — Agafon
79. 1975: Puzyrki
80. 1975: Shag navstrechu — people at the buffet
81. 1976: The Blue Bird — Sugar
82. 1976: Shag navstrechu — Man
83. 1976: Au-u! — Learning
84. 1976: Shepherd Yanka — Prince Kukimor
85. 1976: Merry dreams or Laughter and Tears (TV Movie) — Krivello
86. 1977: Twelve Chairs (TV Mini-Series) — Bezenchuk
87. 1977: The sun, the sun again
88. 1977: Until the clock strikes — Grandfather / The Great Gardener
89. 1977: Marinka, Yanka and the secrets of the royal castle — Prince Kukimor
90. 1978: Istoriya s metranpazhem — Semyon Kaloshin
91. 1980: Borrowing Matchsticks — Tahvo Kenonen, tailor
92. 1980: Comedy of bygone days — Coward
93. 1981: Ruki vverkh!
94. 1982: Love by Request — Hapless Boyfriend-artist (voice, uncredited)
95. 1982: Sorcerers (TV Movie) — cat (voice)
96. 1983: The Pokrovsky Gate — Savelich (voice)
97. 1985: Rivals — old man
98. 1985: Dangerous for Your Life! — Alexander Chokolov
99. 1986: Travel Pan Klyaksa
100. 1986: I counselor outpost
101. 1992: Shot in a coffin — Colonel Zakusnyak
102. 1992: Gospoda Artisty — Nil Palych
103. 1993: Brave guys — Maj. Vasily Griboyedov
104. 1994: A Few Love Stories — Fornari
105. 1994: Lord actors — Nil Palych
106. 1994: Hagi-Tragger — Genrikh Yanovich

=== Cartoons ===
1. 1947: The Humpbacked Horse — the chamberlain (voice, uncredited)
2. 1955: The Enchanted Boy — Rozenbaum (voice)
3. 1956: The Twelve Months — Raven / Herald / Parrot / February (voice, uncredited)
4. 1959: Beloved Beauty — Trukha (voice)
5. 1960: The Adventures of Buratino — Giuseppe / Clown / Crow (voice)
6. 1960: It Was I Who Drew the Little Man — the Confectioner / Poet (voice)
7. 1961: The Key — (voice)
8. 1968: Film, Film, Film (Short) — Film director (voice)
9. 1976: Konyok-gorbunok — Spalnik (voice)
10. 1981: Maria, Mirabela — Caterpillar King (Soviet dub voice)
11. 1991: Priklyucheniya volshebnogo globusa, ili prodelki vedmy — The Little Signor (voice)
12. 1992: Oy, rebyata, ta-ra-ra (voice)
13. 1993: Dreamers from the Village of Ugory — Koschei the Immortal
