= Leonid Gaidai =

Russian film director (1923–1993)

- Леонид Гайдай
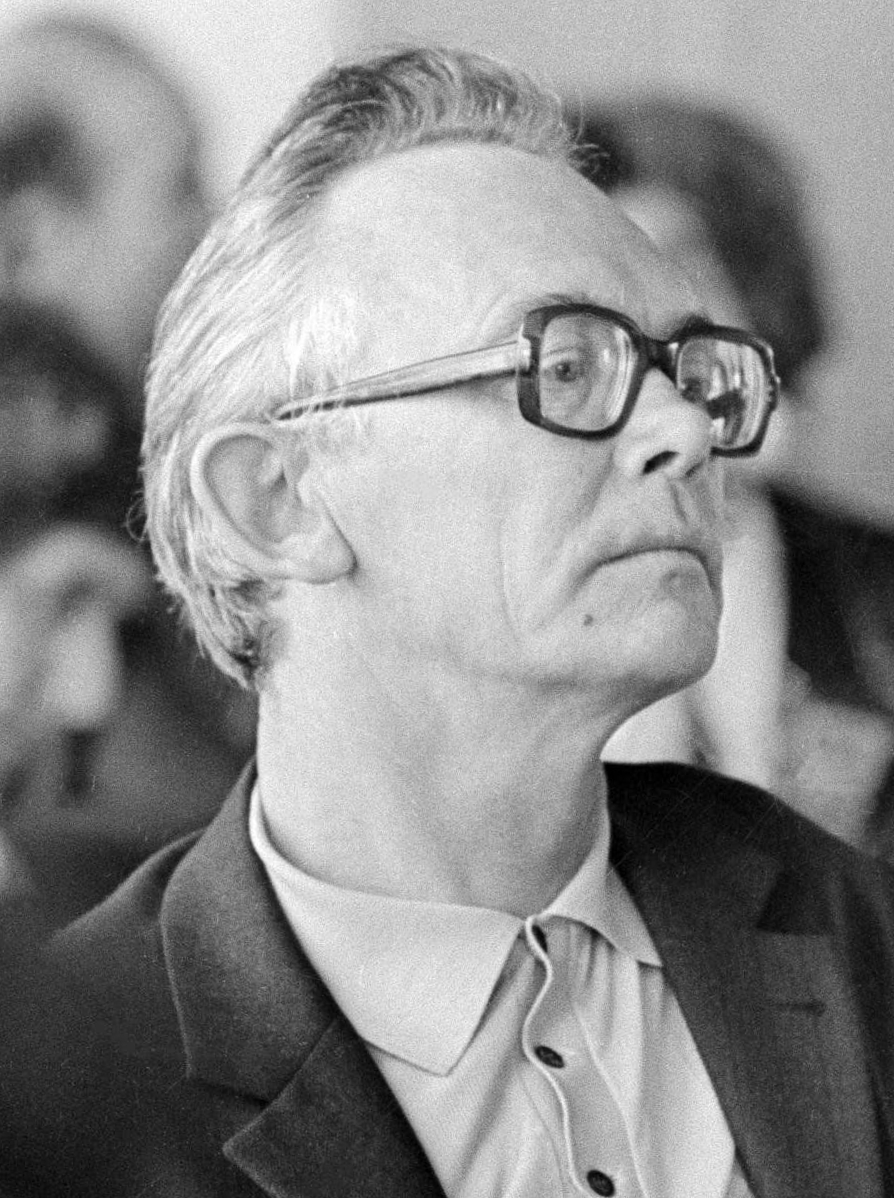
- Gaidai in 1974
- Born: 30 January 1923; Svobodny, Amur Oblast, Soviet Union
- Died: 19 November 1993 (aged 70); Moscow, Russia
- Resting place: Kuntsevo Cemetery
- Occupations: Film director, screenwriter, actor
- Years active: 1955–1992
- Works: Operation Y and Shurik's Other Adventures (1965); Kidnapping, Caucasian Style (1967); The Diamond Arm (1969); The Twelve Chairs (1971); Ivan Vasilievich: Back to the Future (1973)
- Title: People's Artist of the USSR (1989)
- Spouse: Nina Grebeshkova

Leonid Iovich Gaidai (Note: In this name that follows East Slavic naming customs, the patronymic is Iovich and the family name is Gaidai.) (Note: Russian: Леонид Иович Гайдай, romanized: Leonid Iovich Gayday) (30 January 1923 – 19 November 1993) was a Soviet and Russian comedy film director, screenwriter, and actor who enjoyed immense popularity and broad public recognition in the former Soviet Union. His films broke theatre attendance records and were some of the top-selling DVDs in Russia. He has been described as "the king of Soviet comedy".

== Early life and first success ==
Gaidai was born on 30 January 1923 in Svobodny, Amur Oblast, where he is commemorated by a statue. His father, Iov Isidorovich Gaidai, came from a Ukrainian family of serfs of the Poltava Governorate. At the age of 22, he was sentenced to several years of katorga for revolutionary activity and sent to the Far East to work at the railway. Leonid's mother, Maria Ivanovna Lubimova, was born in the Ryazan Oblast to Russian parents. They met through Maria's brother Egor, also a katorga worker, who sent her a photo of his friend along with a marriage proposal. After Gaidai's term expired, they settled down in the Amur Oblast, where Gaidai continued working at the railway building site.

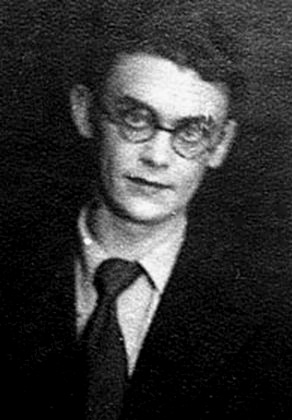
Gaidai in 1941

Leonid was the third child in the family. His elder brother Aleksandr (1919–1994) was a well-known poet and a war correspondent. Leonid took part in amateur dramatics from a young age. He graduated from school on 20 June 1941. Just two days after, the Great Patriotic War started.

In February 1942, he was enrolled in the Red Army. He first served in Mongolia, then finished sergeant courses, becoming a squad leader. He worked in the military intelligence. On 20 December 1942, Gaidai was awarded the Medal "For Battle Merit" for killing three German soldiers and taking hostages during the battle for Yenkino village. On 20 March 1943, he was heavily injured after stepping on a land mine. He spent nine months in military hospitals. In January 1944, he was sent home as war-disabled. In 1945, he joined the Communist Party.

Gaidai studied at the Irkutsk District Drama Theatre's studio school, and after graduating in 1947 acted in theatre productions. He subsequently attended the Moscow Institute of Cinematography, Grigori Aleksandrov workshop, completing his studies in 1955. He married the actress Nina Grebeshkova, who played minor roles in his future films. He initially worked as an assistant to director Boris Barnet on the 1955 film Lyana, before directing the first of his own films in 1956 (the historical drama A Weary Road). His 1958 comedy The Dead Affair was described by Minister of Culture Nikolai Mikhailov as "a lampooning of Soviet Reality" and was cut to 47 minutes by censors as a result, and released as A Groom from the Other World. He subsequently avoided overtly political themes.

His first success came six years after graduation, with a segment of the short film collection Absolutely Seriously (1961), which instantly became highly popular. In this film, Gaidai first introduced a comic trio of crooks, Coward, Fool, and Pro – Georgy Vitsin, Yuri Nikulin, and Yevgeny Morgunov (aka 'ViNiMor'), who later appeared in several of his other films. After his characters and directing style won the public's love, his name gained massive selling power in USSR's cinemas.

== Genre brilliance ==
Between 1961 and 1975, Gaidai directed a number of top-selling films, each one a huge financial success and becoming wildly popular in the Soviet Union. During these years, he filmed new adventures of the mischievous trio in Moonshiners (1961), a film adaptation of O. Henry's short stories, Strictly Business (1962), Operation Y and Shurik's Other Adventures (1965), and Kidnapping, Caucasian Style (1966). Following his break with Morgunov, Gaidai disbanded the trio, while casting Nikulin in what was to become the most popular Soviet comedy ever made, The Diamond Arm (1968).

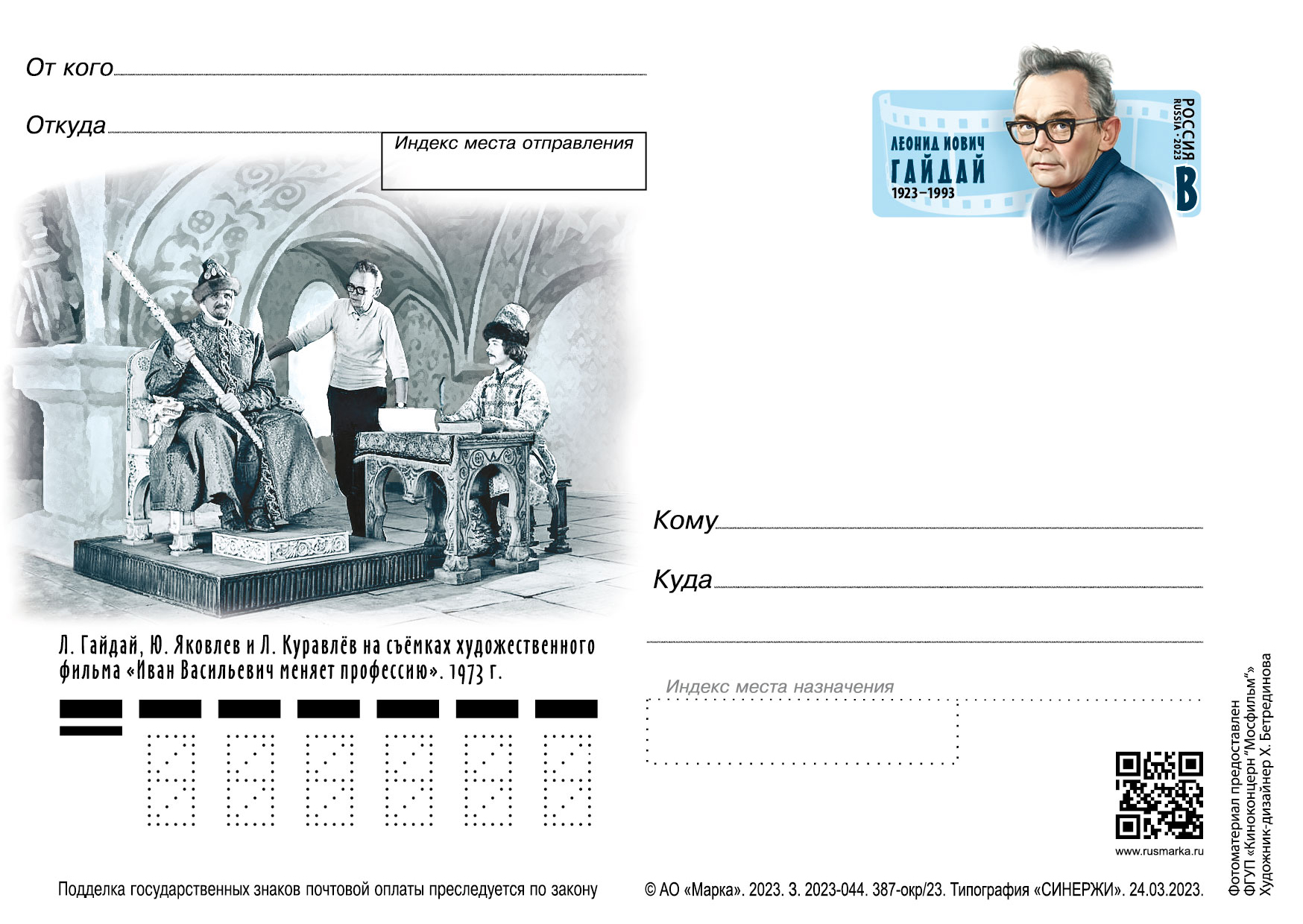
2023 postal cover of Russia dedicated to Ivan Vasilievich: Back to the Future. Its left image shows, left to right: Yakovlev, Gaidai, and Kuravlyov. The right image shows Gaidai.

The comic trio of Pro, Coward, and Fool in Gaidai's comedy Kidnapping, Caucasian Style (1966)

In the 1970s, Gaidai worked primarily with the comedians from his own studio group, which included Vitsin, Kuravlyov, Pugovkin, Kramarov, Seleznyova, Krachkovskaya, and his wife Nina Grebeshkova. All this cast was featured in his film adaptation of Mikhail Zoshchenko's short stories, It Can't Be! (1975). He also filmed a play by Mikhail Bulgakov, Ivan Vasilievich: Back to the Future (1973), Ilf and Petrov's The Twelve Chairs (1971), Nikolai Gogol's Incognito from St. Petersburg (1977), and Borrowing Matchsticks (1980), a story by the Finnish author Maiju Lassila.

== Commercial success ==
Gaidai's top-grossing film The Diamond Arm, sold 76.7 million tickets in the Soviet Union alone, becoming the third highest-grossing Soviet film. At $8 per ticket (regular fare in an American movie theatre in 2005), it would have generated revenue comparable to the US box office champion Titanic. In a 1995 survey by RTR, it was voted the best comedy ever made. It was followed closely by Gaidai's other comedy films — Kidnapping, Caucasian Style (fourth place with 76.5 million viewers), Operation Y and Shurik's Other Adventures (seventh place with 69.6 million viewers) and Ivan Vasilievich: Back to the Future (17th place with 60.7 million viewers).

== Later years ==
After 1975, Gaidai went into a period of significant decline; his only other notable work was a joint Soviet-Finnish film Borrowing Matchsticks (За спичками, Tulitikkuja lainaamassa), completed in 1980. After the collapse of the Soviet Union, he directed only one more film, capitalizing on the early perestroika business activities and starring Dmitry Kharatyan. Gaidai has a cameo in the final one, There's Good Weather in Deribasovskaya, where he plays an old gambler who tries to beat the one-armed bandit. In real life, Gaidai was addicted to gambling. These proved to be the most popular of his works filmed after 1975, but lacked the success of his earlier work. Gaidai was made a People's Artist of the RSFSR in 1974, People's Artist of the USSR in 1989, and died in Moscow on 19 November 1993. He was buried at the Kuntsevo Cemetery.

On 30 January 2013 Google celebrated his 90th birthday with a Google Doodle.

== Style ==
Gaidai's comedies have a very visual style of comedy, utilizing slapstick and physical humor, with dialogue that has been described as "pithy, aphoristic, or nonsensical". He was a master of fast-paced comedy, his style and rhythm somewhat similar to Stanley Kramer's It's a Mad, Mad, Mad, Mad World. While his films on the surface portray socialist ideals, there are subversive elements and satire. He continued to suffer interference from censors, and said of his films "We will use the means of satire to fight the flaws which still sometimes hinder the lives of Soviet people".

== Assessment ==
Gaidai remains most famous for the outstanding string of comedies he directed between 1961 and 1975, when nine of the ten films he made became Russian classics, selling between 20 and 76 million tickets each, and becoming box office champions for several years in a row. He is less known outside of the former Soviet Union, due to the specific nature of his comedies, intrinsically tied to Soviet culture and lifestyle – unlike the motives of the characters of Kramer's "Mad World" being easily understood by the Russian public, living in the highly materialistic world of late Soviet Union. Gaidai's international recognition included a nomination for best short film at the 1961 Cannes Film Festival for Dog Barbos and Unusual Cross. and the Grand Prix Wawel Silver Dragon at the Kraków Film Festival (Poland) in 1965 for the segment "Déjà vu" in the film Operation Y and Shurik's Other Adventures.

== Filmography ==
Year	Title	Original title			
Year	Title	Original title	Director	Screenwriter	Notes
1955	Lyana	Ляна			Actor (Alyosha)
1956	A Weary Road	Долгий путь	✓		
1958	The Wind	Ветер			Actor (Naumenko the Red comissar)
1958	A Groom from the Other World	Жених с того света	✓		
1960	Thrice Resurrected	Трижды воскресший	✓		Cameo (inventor)
1960	On the Way	В пути			Actor (Tolya)
1961	Dog Barbos and Unusual Cross	Пёс Барбос и необычный кросс	✓	✓	Actor (bear in a tent, deleted scene)
1961	Moonshiners	Самогонщики	✓	✓	Actor (Pro's wife, deleted scene)
1962	Strictly Business	Деловые люди	✓	✓	
1965	Operation Y and Shurik's Other Adventures	Операция «Ы» и другие приключения Шурика	✓	✓	
1966	Kidnapping, Caucasian Style	Кавказская пленница, или Новые приключения Шурика	✓	✓	
1969	The Diamond Arm	Бриллиантовая рука	✓	✓	Cameo (drunkard / Gorbunkov's arm in Kozodoyev's dream)
1971	The Twelve Chairs	12 стульев	✓	✓	Actor (Varfolomey Korobeinikov)
1972	My God, Ilya!	Боже мой, Илья!	✓	✓	Cameo (member of crowd)
1973	Ivan Vasilievich: Back to the Future	Иван Васильевич меняет профессию	✓	✓	Yakin's light assistant
1975	It Can't Be!	Не может быть!	✓	✓	
1977	Incognito from St. Petersburg	Инкогнито из Петербурга	✓	✓	
1977	Nothing Ventured, Nothing Gained	Риск — благородное дело			Cameo (film director)
1978	Along the Streets a Commode Was Led	По улицам комод водили			Creative director
1980	Borrowing Matchsticks	За спичками	✓	✓	Soviet-Finnish co-production
1981–1988	Fitil	Фитиль	✓		A total of 14 shorts
1982	Sportloto-82	Спортлото-82	✓	✓	
1985	Dangerous for Your Life!	Опасно для жизни!	✓	✓	
1989	Private Detective, or Operation Cooperation	Частный детектив, или Операция «Кооперация»	✓	✓	
1992	Weather Is Good on Deribasovskaya, It Rains Again on Brighton Beach	На Дерибасовской хорошая погода, или На Брайтон-Бич опять идут дожди	✓	✓	Cameo (mad gambler); Russian-American co-production

== Awards and honours ==
- Medal "For Battle Merit" (1942)
- Honoured Worker of the Arts Industry of the RSFSR (29 September 1969)
- Vasilyev Brothers State Prize of the RSFSR (1970)
- People's Artist of the RSFSR (28 March 1974)
- Order of the Patriotic War, 1st class (1985)
- People's Artist of the USSR (18 August 1989)
- Jubilee Medal "In Commemoration of the 100th Anniversary of the Birth of Vladimir Ilyich Lenin"
- Jubilee Medal "Twenty Years of Victory in the Great Patriotic War 1941–1945"
- Jubilee Medal "Thirty Years of Victory in the Great Patriotic War 1941–1945"
- Jubilee Medal "Forty Years of Victory in the Great Patriotic War 1941–1945"
- Jubilee Medal "50 Years of the Armed Forces of the USSR"
- Jubilee Medal "60 Years of the Armed Forces of the USSR"
- Jubilee Medal "70 Years of the Armed Forces of the USSR"
- Medal "For the Victory over Germany in the Great Patriotic War 1941–1945"
- Medal "Veteran of Labour"
