= Yevgeny Morgunov =

Soviet and Russian actor, film director and script writer

- Евгений Моргунов
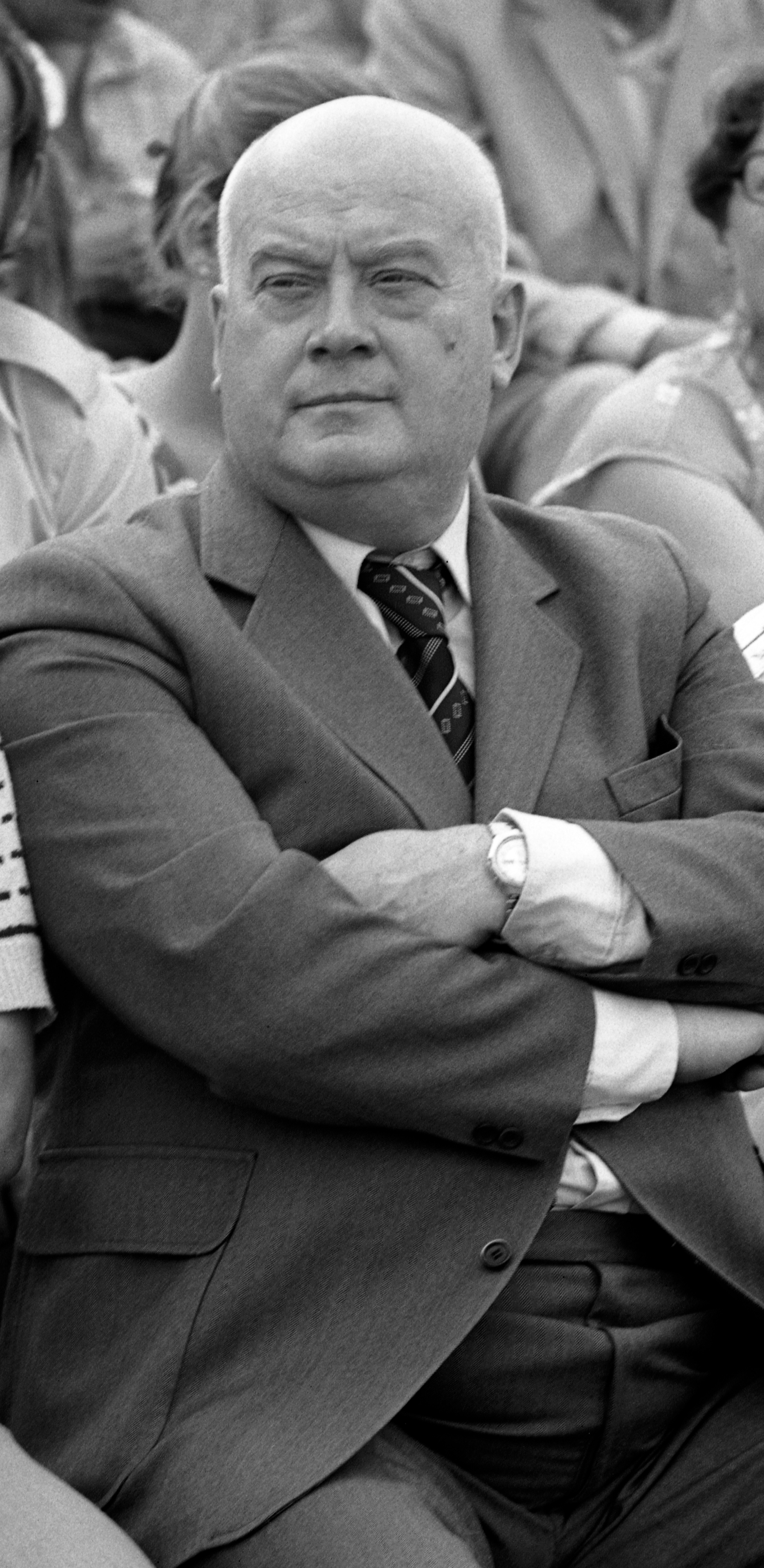
- Morgunov in the 1980s
- Born: April 27, 1927; Moscow, Russian SFSR, Soviet Union
- Died: June 25, 1999 (aged 72); Moscow Central Clinical Hospital, Moscow, Russia
- Resting place: Kuntsevo Cemetery
- Occupations: Actor; screenwriter
- Years active: 1943–1998
- Spouse: Natalya Morgunova (m. 1965)
- Children: 2
- Awards: Merited Artist of Russian SFSR (1978)

Yevgeny Alexandrovich Morgunov (Russian: Евгений Александрович Моргунов; April 27, 1927 – June 25, 1999) was a Soviet and Russian actor, film director, and script writer, Merited Artist of Russian SFSR (1978).

== Early life ==
He started out as a worker in a Moscow factory, but, "a little naive and obsessed with becoming an actor", he wrote a letter to Joseph Stalin about his dream. Morgunov reportedly received a reply from Stalin that said that a place was allocated for him in the acting class at the State Institute of Cinematography. Morgunov launched his film career while still a student.

== Career ==
Morgunov was one of Russia's leading comic actors. "Plump and bald," Morgunov often "represented a traditional character of Soviet satire – Byvaly, or Experienced, a slightly dull, strong-built drunk whose attempts to commit petty crimes always failed."

Although his acting career was not limited to comedies, he was best known for his work in a comic trio Coward, Fool, and Pro in a series of films by Leonid Gaidai, with Yuri Nikulin as Fool (Balbes), and Georgy Vitsin as Coward (Trus). Their best-known films together were Operation Y and Other Shurik's Adventures and Prisoner of the Caucasus, or Shurik's New Adventures. Morgunov's character named Experienced (Byvaly) was always the "tight-lipped and aggressive leader of the group". Reportedly, "the three symbolized exactly what Soviet men were not supposed to be: drunk, unemployed and inclined toward mischief." In one of the legendary scenes in Caucasian Kidnapping Experienced gives lessons on how to dance the twist: by putting out cigarette butts with his feet.

However, after his triumphant role of "Byvaly", Morgunov was not much into filming. His best works included those in films Three Fat Men (1966), Ilf and Petrov Went by Tram (1972). There were also other, less noteworthy roles. Morgunov also tried his wings as a film director. As early as 1962, he directed the comedy When the Cossacks Weep under the patronage of the illustrious writer Michail Sholokhov. However, the film remained his only director's work.

In 1993, Morgunov was featured in an American-Russian adventure film My Family Treasure (Сокровище моей семьи) directed by Rolfe Kanefsky and Edward Staroselsky alongside Dee Wallace.

Morgunov's popularity was not far behind that of his partner Nikulin, a famous actor and clown of the Moscow Circus.

Morgunov is buried at the Kuntsevo Cemetery.

== Selected filmography ==
- Six P.M. (1944)
- It Happened in the Donbass (1945)
- The Young Guard (1948)
- Brave People (1950)
- Hostile Whirlwinds (1953)
- Othello (1956)
- Destiny of a Man (1959)
- Resurrection (1960)
- Dog Barbos and Unusual Cross (1961)
- Scarlet Sails (1961)
- Moonshiners (1961)
- When the Cossacks Weep (1963)
- A Tale of Lost Times (1964)
- Give me a complaints book (1965)
- Operation Y and Shurik's Other Adventures (1965)
- Three Fat Men (1966)
- Kidnapping, Caucasian Style (1967)
- Seven Old Men and a Girl (1968)
- Ilf and Petrov Rode a Tram (1972)
- Unbelievable Adventures of Italians in Russia (1973)
- Northern Rhapsody (1974)
- Circus in the Circus (1976)
- The Pokrovsky Gate (1982)
- Simply Awful! (1982)
- Yeralash (1984)
- Act, Manya! (1991)
