= Moonshiners (1961 film) =

1961 Soviet film

- Directed by: Leonid Gaidai
- Written by: Leonid Gaidai
- Produced by: Leonid Gaidai
- Starring: Yuri Nikulin; Georgy Vitsin; Yevgeny Morgunov
- Cinematography: Konstantin Brovin
- Music by: Nikita Bogoslovsky
- Production company: Mosfilm
- Release date: 1961
- Running time: 19 min.
- Country: Soviet Union
- Language: Russian

Moonshiners (Russian: Самогонщики, romanized: Samogonshchiki) is a 1961 Soviet short comedy film directed by Leonid Gaidai.

== Plot summary ==
The trio Coward, Fool, and Pro make moonshine alcohol in a hut hid in a forest. At work they sing about their moonshine still. Their dog takes a piece of it (a coiled condenser) and runs away. The trio chase the dog, using skis. In the end the dog makes them run to the police department, where the moonshiners are arrested.

== Cast ==
- Yuri Nikulin as The Fool
- Georgy Vitsin as The Coward
- Yevgeny Morgunov as The Pro
- Vladimir Pitsek as strict militsiya officer
- Dog Rex as Dog Barbos
