= Nikita Bogoslovsky =

Russian composer (1913–2004)

Nikita Bogoslovsky Никита Богословский
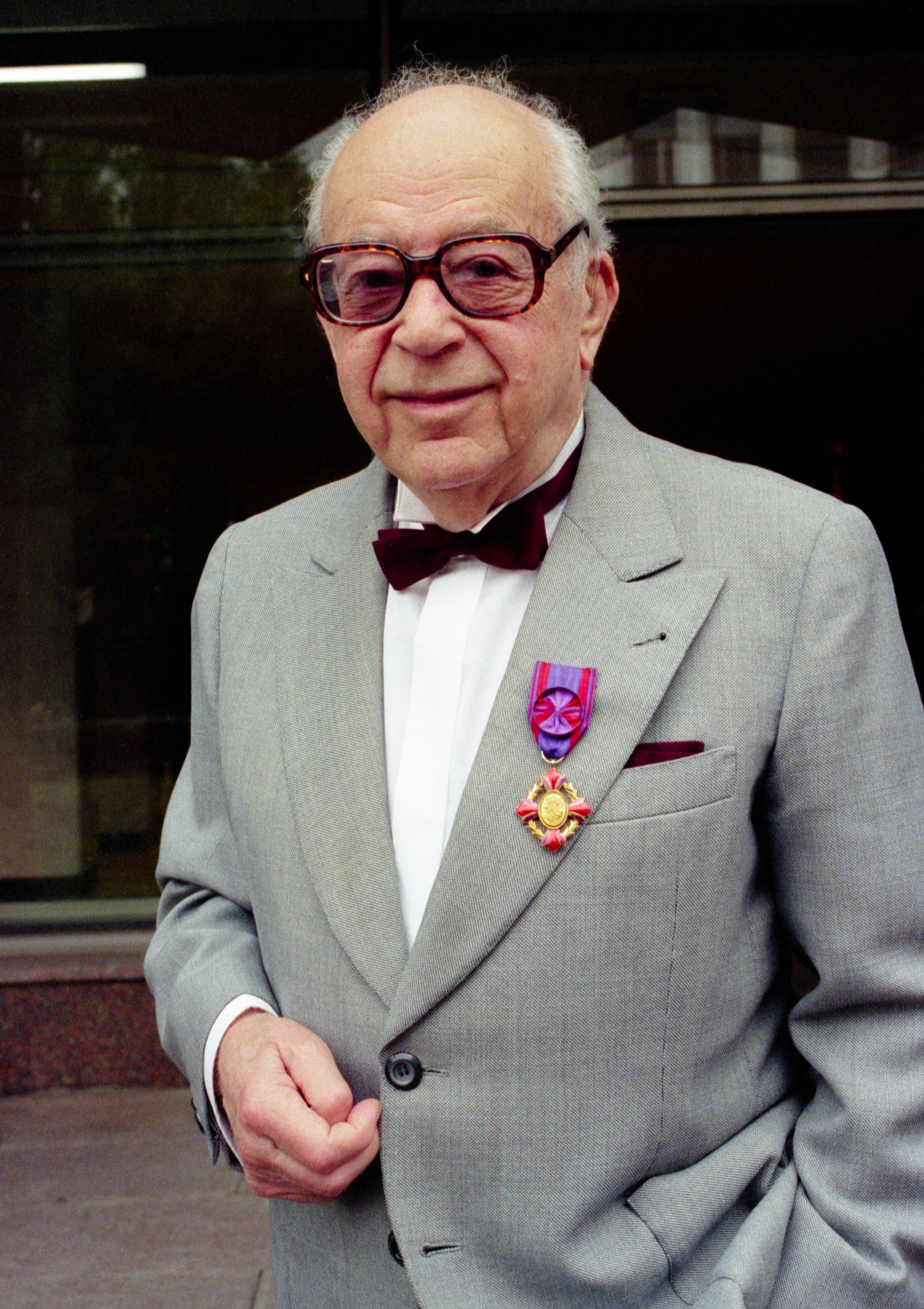
- Bogoslovsky in 1997

Background information
- Born: Nikita Vladimirovich Bogoslovsky; 22 May 1913; Saint Petersburg, Russian Empire
- Died: 4 April 2004 (aged 90) Moscow, Russia
- Occupations: Composer, conductor
- Instrument: Piano
- Years active: 1928–2004

Nikita Vladimirovich Bogoslovsky (Russian: Никита Владимирович Богословский; 22 May 1913 – 4 April 2004) was a Soviet and Russian composer. Author of more than 300 songs, 8 symphonies (1940–1991), 17 operettas and musical comedies, 58 soundtracks, and 52 scores for theater productions. Many of his songs were made for film.

Bogoslovsky was born into an aristocratic family in St. Petersburg, Russian Empire. At the age of four in 1917, the new communist government born from the Russian revolution confiscated his family's lands and properties in the Russian provinces of Novgorod and Tambov. His mother's playing of songs by Alexander Vertinsky were among his first musical inspirations; thus, he was taught piano from the age of three, studying composing with Alexander Glazunov in 1927–1928 as an audit at the Leningrad Conservatory in 1930–1934.

His first musical was written at the age of 15, titled, "Noch pered Rozhdestvom" (Christmas Eve night); his first works expressed the hopes and desires of the Soviet people, telling the history of Russia. He is best known for two Mark Bernes' trademark songs from the war film Two Soldiers (1943): "Tyomnaya noch" (Dark Is the Night) and "Shalandy polnye kefali" (Boats Full of Mullets). In the post-Stalin period, Bogoslovsky was particularly successful with music for comedies. His output ranged from pop to folklore and neoclassical symphonic tunes.

Among his many honorary titles and state awards were People's Artist of the USSR (1983), Order of the Red Banner of Labour (1971), and Order of the Red Star (1946). He died 4 April 2004 in Moscow.

== Filmography ==
- Treasure Island (Остров сокровищ, 1938)
- A Great Life (Большая жизнь, 1939)
- The Fighters (Истребители, 1939)
- Mysterious Island (Таинственный остров, 1941)
- Alexander Parkhomenko (Александр Пархоменко, 1942)
- A Good Lad (Славный малый, 1942)
- Two Soldiers (Два бойца, 1943)
- It Happened in the Donbas (Это было в Донбассе, 1945)
- Fifteen-Year-Old Captain (Пятнадцатилетний капитан, 1945)
- A Crazy Day (Безумный день, 1956)
- Different Fortunes (Разные судьбы, 1956)
- 20,000 Leagues Across the Land (Леон Гаррос ищет друга, 1960)
- Thrice Resurrected (Трижды воскресший, 1960)
- It Was I Who Drew the Little Man (Человечка нарисовал я, 1960)
- Dog Barbos and Unusual Cross (Пёс Барбос и необычный кросс, 1961)
- Moonshiners (Самогонщики, 1961)
- No Fear, No Blame (Без страха и упрёка, 1962)
- An Easy Life (Лёгкая жизнь, 1964)
- The Mysterious Monk (Таинственный монах, 1967)
- Ilf and Petrov Rode a Tram (Ехали в трамвае Ильф и Петров, 1972)
- The Headless Horseman (Всадник без головы, 1973)

== Video ==
- Dark Night on YouTube, Nikita Bogoslovsky's song, sung by Mark Bernes in The Two Fighters (1943) film.
