= Alla Surikova =

Soviet film director

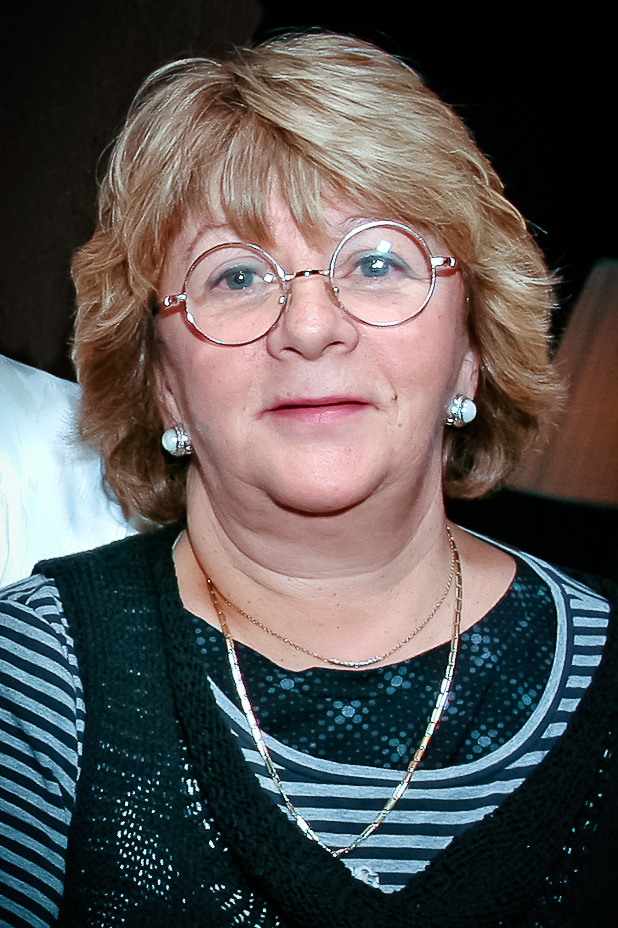

Alla Ilinichna Surikova (Russian: А́лла Ильи́нична Су́рикова; born November 6, 1940, in Kyiv) is a Soviet and Russian film director, writer, and teacher.

She is a People's Artist of Russia (2000), winner of the Award of the Government of the Russian Federation (2009), and a member of the Russian Union of Cinematographers.

She is best known as the director of the Red Western comedy film A Man from the Boulevard des Capucines which starred famous Soviet actors including Andrei Mironov, Aleksandra Yakovleva, Nikolai Karachentsov, Oleg Tabakov, Leonid Yarmolnik, Mikhail Boyarsky and Igor Kvasha.

== Selected filmography ==
- Fuss of the Fusses (Суета сует, 1979)
- Be My Husband (Будьте моим мужем, 1982)
- Look for a Woman (Ищите женщину, 1983)
- Sincerely Yours... (Искренне Ваш..., 1985)
- A Man from the Boulevard des Capucines (1987)
- Two arrows. Stone Age Detective (Две стрелы. Детектив каменного века, 1989)
- Crazies (Чокнутые, 1991)
- Moscow Vacation (Московские каникулы, 1995)
- Children of Monday (Дети понедельника, 1997)
- I Want to Go to Prison (Хочу в тюрьму, 1998)
