= I Want to Go to Prison =

- Russian: Хочу в тюрьму
- Directed by: Alla Surikova
- Written by: Vladimir Yeryomin
- Produced by: Yevgeny Gindilis; Frits Harkema; Vitaly Koshman
- Starring: Vladimir Ilyin; Natalya Gundareva; Alla Kliouka; Mikhail Petrovsky; Sergey Batalov
- Cinematography: Grigoriy Belenkiy
- Edited by: Inessa Brozhovskaya
- Music by: Viktor Lebedev
- Production company: NTV Profit
- Release date: 1998
- Running time: 89 min.
- Country: Russia
- Language: Russian

I Want to Go to Prison (Russian: Хочу в тюрьму, romanized: Khochu v tyurmu) is a 1998 Russian comedy film directed by Alla Surikova.

== Plot ==
Semyon Lyamkin (Vladimir Ilyin) is a mechanic capable of fixing and assembling anything. When his factory laid off all the workers, Semyon, the head of a large family, found himself out of work. In search of income, Semyon accepts a job offer from a casual acquaintance, not realizing that this person leads a criminal gang. By a stroke of luck, Semyon avoids a run-in with the police.

While considering how to go underground, Semyon accidentally sees a news report about a Dutch prison on TV. It turns out that in developed European countries, prisoners are treated quite humanely. Semyon comes up with an idea: to go abroad (to the Netherlands), get imprisoned there, and thus ride out the dangerous period until Russian law enforcement loses interest in him. Semyon sets off in his heavily modified Zaporozhets, which is even capable of crossing water obstacles.

Getting to the Netherlands is not difficult. Much harder is to break local laws in a way that ensures he is arrested and sentenced to a term that is neither too short nor too long. Attempting to provoke an arrest, Lyamkin draws a mustache and beard on a portrait of the Queen of the Netherlands, thereby insulting Her Majesty. Adding assault on a law enforcement officer to the mix, Lyamkin ends up with a four-month sentence in a Dutch prison. After serving his time in relatively comfortable conditions, he returns home, where he encounters real crime again. Using his ingenuity and his Zaporozhets, Semyon manages to come out on top in a showdown with the criminals.

== Cast ==
- Vladimir Ilyin as Lyamkin
- Natalya Gundareva as Masha
- Alla Kliouka as Marie
- Mikhail Petrovsky as Chris
- Sergey Batalov as Vovan
- Boris Shcherbakov as Oleg Ivanovich
- Kira Surikova as Secretary
- Oleg Korytin as Russian Policeman #1
- Yury Lugovsky as Russian Policeman #2
- Oleg Bocharov as Bandit
- Yuriy Dumchev as big guy
- Zoya Buryak as Marianna
- Valery Kukhareshin as cafe visitor

== Awards and nominations ==
Kinotavr

- Vladimir Ilyin (Best Actor) — won
- Best Film — nom

Nika Award

- Vladimir Ilyin (Best Actor) — won

== Critical response ==
Alexander Fedorov: Alla Surikova, in my opinion, this time staged a simple and almost not funny comedy. The film clearly falls short of an eccentric comedy of masks due to the lack of original tricks and situations. And for a comedy of characters, the characters look too flat and primitive.

Sergey Kudryavtsev: It seems that our only active female comedian, Alla Surikova, is still working unevenly. The false and forced film "Moscow Vacation" was replaced by a more natural film "Monday's Children", but after it a bad comedy appeared again.
