= Aelita, Do Not Pester Men! =

- Russian poster
- Russian: Аэлита, не приставай к мужчинам
- Directed by: Georgy Natanson
- Written by: Georgy Natanson; Edvard Radzinsky
- Starring: Natalya Gundareva; Valentin Gaft; Alexander Kuznetsov; Valentin Smirnitskiy; Boris Shcherbakov
- Cinematography: Vladimir Myasnikov; Sergey Vronskiy
- Music by: Mikael Tariverdiev
- Production company: Mosfilm
- Release date: 1988
- Running time: 89 minutes
- Country: Soviet Union
- Language: Russian

Aelita, Do Not Pester Men! (Russian: Аэлита, не приставай к мужчинам, romanized: Aelita, ne pristavay k muzhchinam!) is a 1988 Soviet romantic comedy film directed by Georgy Natanson.

== Plot ==
The film tells about an unusual and gullible woman who, in spite of everything, continues to believe that she will become happy.

== Cast ==
- Natalya Gundareva as Aelita
- Valentin Gaft as Skameikin
- Alexander Kuznetsov as Fedya Sidorov
- Valentin Smirnitskiy as Apokin
- Boris Shcherbakov as inspector
- Irina Shmeleva as chemical plant worker
- Georgy Martirosyan as companion of the actress
- Ella Nekrasova as chemical plant worker
- Klara Rumyanova as chemical plant worker
- Tamara Sovchi as episode
