= Crazies (film) =

- Russian: Чокнутые
- Directed by: Alla Surikova
- Written by: Vladimir Kunin; Kim Ryzhov
- Produced by: Yuriy Kushneryov
- Starring: Nikolai Karachentsov; Leonid Yarmolnik; Sergey Stepanchenko; Olga Kabo; Natalya Gundareva
- Cinematography: Valeriy Shuvalov
- Edited by: Raisa Lisova
- Music by: Gennady Gladkov
- Release date: 1991
- Country: Soviet Union
- Language: Russian

Crazies (Russian: Чокнутые, romanized: Choknutye) is a 1991 Soviet tragicomedy film directed by Alla Surikova.

== Plot ==
The Russian Empire of the time of Nicholas I. Austrian engineer Otto von Gerstner (his prototype was Franz Anton von Gerstner) is traveling to Russia to implement a project for the construction of the first railway, which should connect Saint Petersburg and Tsarskoye Selo. Arriving in Russia, he gathers a team of like-minded people and goes to the goal, despite the problems that constantly stand in his way. The cause of these problems turn out to be the owners of the horse-drawn companies, who, in the fight against a dangerous competitor, as it seems to them, do not even disdain to hire a "coup specialist" in order to ruin von Gerstner and his enterprise. When, it seems, nothing can save the enterprise of the first Russian railway workers from failure, a being sent by higher powers comes to their aid — the guardian angel Masha…

== Cast ==
- Ulrich Pleitgen as Otto Franz von Gerstner, engineer
- Nikolai Karachentsov as Rodion Ivanovich Kiryukhin, retired lieutenant
- Leonid Yarmolnik as Tikhon Zaitsev, employee of the Third Section of His Imperial Majesty's Own Chancellery
- Sergey Stepanchenko as Fyodor, who goes under the name Giacomo Pirandello
- Olga Kabo as Masha
- Natalya Gundareva as Countess Otreshkova
- Georgy Shtil as Count Potocki
- Vsevolod Larionov as prince Rozanov-Razdorsky
- Leonard Sarkisov as Count Otreshkov
- Valery Matveyev as singing valet of the Oreshkovs
- Mikhail Filippov as Otreshkova's companion
- Viktor Proskurin as Ivan Ivanovich Ivanov, a specialist in coups
- Semyon Farada as Adam (Aron) Ziprowski, a Russian secret agent in Austria
- Natalya Krachkovskaya as the agent's wife
- Mikhail Boyarsky as Emperor Nicholas I of Russia
- Aleksei Zharkov as Alexander von Benckendorff, chief of the Third Section of His Imperial Majesty's Own Chancellery
- Aleksandr Shirvindt as George Stephenson
- Mikhail Derzhavin as Thaddeus Bulgarin
- Donovan Scott as a robber with a frog
- Vladislav Strzhelchik as general-cuckold (uncredited)
