= Step Forward (film) =

- Lyudmila Gurchenko as Valentina
- Directed by: Naum Birman
- Written by: Emil Braginsky
- Produced by: Galina Shadur; Karen Shakhnazarov
- Starring: Lyudmila Gurchenko; Nikolay Volkov Jr. Andrey Popov; Yevgeny Leonov; Lev Durov; Boris Shcherbakov; Andrei Mironov
- Cinematography: Alexander Chirov
- Edited by: Lyudmila Sviridenko
- Music by: Stanislav Pozhlakov
- Production company: Lenfilm
- Release date: 1975
- Running time: 77 min.
- Country: Russia
- Language: Russian

Step Forward (Russian: Шаг навстречу, romanized: Shag navstrechu) is a 1975 Soviet film-an almanac, consisting of five novels.

== Plot ==
Five novels, united by the history of the nascent love of two elderly people, who see each other every day on the way to work. Meeting every day in public transport, they do not suspect that they are neighbors around the house, and they are constantly giving each other a lot of trouble.

== Cast ==
Step Forward

- Lyudmila Gurchenko as Valentina Stepanovna
- Nikolay Volkov Jr. as Igor Anatolievich
- Yelena Anderegg as janitor

The Captain's Daughter

- Andrey Popov as captain
- Yelena Tsyplakova as Lida, captain's daughter, student
- Georgy Vitsin as man in buffet
- Lyudmila Ivanova as taxi driver
- Vera Titova as barmaid
- Anatoly Popov as student
- Natalia Chetverikova as girl at airport

Father Seraphim

- Yevgeny Leonov as Seraphim Nikitich, engineer
- Valentina Vladimirova as Maria Timofeevna, his wife
- Yelena Solovey as Tatyana
- Semyon Morozov as assistant engineer
- Valentina Telegina as nurse in hospital
- Olesya Ivanova as stationmaster

Meat a la Argentine

- Lev Durov as Georgy Dmitrievich, cook
- Valentina Titova as his wife
- Vladimir Basov as Nikolay Borisovich Streshnikov, saxophonist

Wedding March

- Yelena Drapeko as Katya Zaitseva
- Boris Shcherbakov as Vovka Monastyryov, her fiance
- Anatoly Rudakov as Sergey
- Svetlana Vadas as Vera
- Stanislav Sokolov as seller

For 30 kopecks only

- Andrei Mironov as Markel Vladimirovich Kochetkov, dentist
- Yekaterina Vasilyeva as Lyuba, his wife
- Pavel Pankov as Alexander Yevgenievich, head physician
- Alexander Anisimov as taxi driver
- Sergey Boyarsky as lottery ticket seller
- Vladimir Zemlyanikin as correspondent
- Natalya Krachkovskaya as winner of lottery
- Svetlana Karpinskaya as a nurse
- Kira Kreylis-Petrova as controller in a supermarket
- Igor Okrepilov as doctor
- Inna Slobodskaya as dentist
- Lidia Shtykan as worker of supermarket
- Kirill Hunn as patient with a cane
- Era Ziganshina as saleswoman

== Filming ==
Some episodes of film were shot at the stations of Saint Petersburg Metro Narvskaya and Dachnoye.
