= Anton Tabakov =

Russian actor (born 1960)

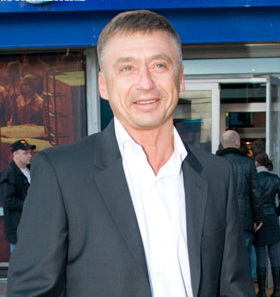
Anton Tabakov

Anton Olegovich Tabakov (Russian: Анто́н Оле́гович Табако́в; born 1960) is a Russian actor.

He is the son of fellow Russian actors Oleg Tabakov and Lyudmila Krylova.

As of 2005, he owned the Pilot Club, a nightclub in Moscow on Krasnaya Presnya in the former Zuyev Culture House.

== Filmography ==
- Timur and His Team (1976)
- Air Crew (1979)
- Be My Husband (1982)
- Time and the Conways (1984)
- A Man from the Boulevard des Capucines (1986)
- The Assassin of the Tsar (1991)
- The Thief (1997)
