= Oleg Anofriyev =

Soviet and Russian actor, singer, poet

Oleg Anofriyev Олег Анофриев

Background information
- Born: 20 July 1930; Gelendzhik, Russian SFSR, Soviet Union
- Died: 28 March 2018 (aged 87) Moscow, Russia
- Genre: Pop
- Years active: 1955–2018
- Website: Oleg Anofriev's Diary

Oleg Andreyevich Anofriyev (sometimes spelled Anofriev, Russian: Олег Андреевич Анофриев; 20 July 1930 – 28 March 2018), PAR, was a Soviet and Russian theatre and film actor, voice actor, singer, songwriter, film director, and poet. He was born in Gelendzhik, but spent all his life in Moscow and graduated from Moscow Art Theatre in 1954. He was widely popular in USSR (mostly due to the leading role in The Bremen Town Musicians animated film) and was honored with the title Honored Artist of the RSFSR and later, People's Artist of the Russian Federation.

== Biography ==
Oleg Andreyevich Anofriyev was born in Gelendzhik on 20 July 1930 in the family of a doctor, head of medical furniture at the GPP-1, Andrei Sergeyevich Anofriyev and housewife Maria Gavrilovna Anofriyeva and was their third son. He had two older brothers, Sergei and Vladimir. Although the family lived in Moscow, Oleg was born in Gelendzhik, because during the summer holiday season, Andrei received an appointment every year as chief physician in a sanatorium on the Black Sea coast (when Oleg was born, Andrei was the chief physician of the sanatorium of the Moscow State University).

== Public position ==
He was not a member of any political party; however, in 1999 he was part of a support group for the creation of the Unity ("Bear") electoral bloc.

He spoke positively of the activities of Vladimir Putin and Sergei Shoigu.

In a 2014 interview with the newspaper Kultura, he stated that in Ukraine "sentimental killers suffering from an inferiority complex are operating, and their targets have become the Donetsk and Luhansk regions — Russian people who had long developed this territory and lived there by their own labor." Nevertheless, he did not share the views of Oleg Tabakov, who made critical remarks about Ukrainians in a July 2015 interview.

In 2016, he stated that he had been a Christian for more than 50 years, while also saying that he did not believe in the institution of the Church or in intermediaries between himself and God.

== Death ==
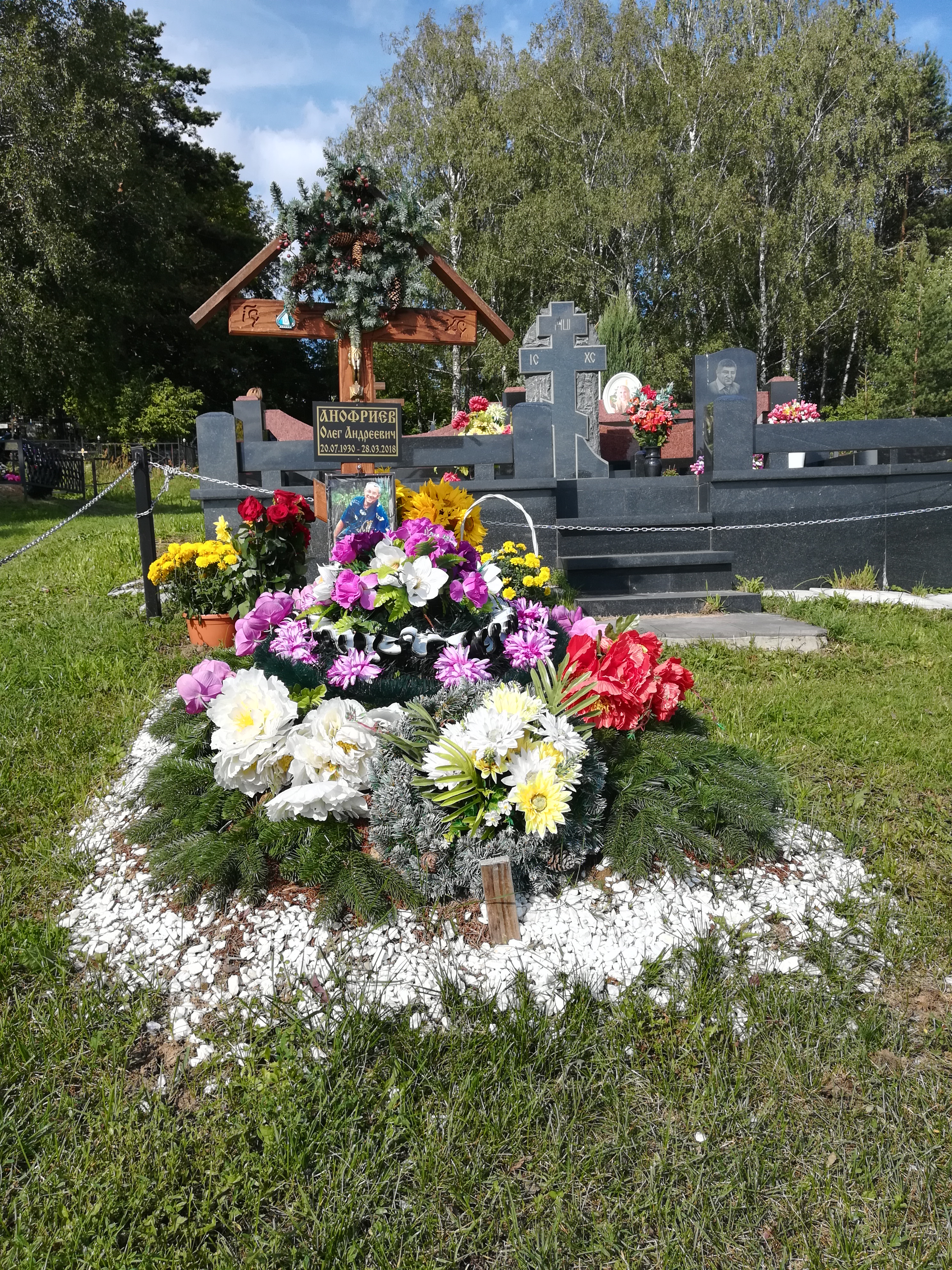
Oleg Anofriev's grave, 2019

Throughout his life, Anofriev suffered from coronary artery disease. He suffered a heart attack at the age of 35. In 2007, he underwent coronary artery bypass surgery. He died on 28 March 2018 in Moscow from severe heart disease.

== Selected filmography ==
=== Actor ===
- Behind Show Windows (За витриной универмага, 1955) as Slava Sidorkin
- A Girl with Guitar (Девушка с гитарой, 1958) as Vanya Savushkin
- A Simple Story (Простая история, 1960) as Agronomist
- Scarlet Sails (Алые паруса, 1961) as Letika the seaman
- Funny Stories (Весёлые истории, 1962) as Fedka
- Colleagues (Коллеги, 1962) as Vladka Karpov
- Tale About the Lost Time (Сказка о потерянном времени, 1964) as old Petya
- Friends and Years (Друзья и годы, 1965) as Vadim Lyalin
- Passing Through Moscow (В Москве проездом..., 1970) as Alik
- Car, Violin and Blot the Dog (Автомобиль, скрипка и собака Клякса, 1974) as Accordion and electric guitar musician
- Incognito from St. Petersburg (Инкогнито из Петербурга, 1977) as Bobchinsky/Singing voice for Ivan Khlestakov
- The Turning Point (Поворот, 1978) as Vedeneyev's lawyer
- Be My Husband (Будьте моим мужем, 1981) as Spa visitor-veterinarian
- Along Unknown Paths (Там, на неведомых дорожках..., 1982) as Nightingale the Robber
- After the Rain, on Thursday (После дождичка в четверг, 1985) as King Avdey
- One Second for a Feat (Секунда на подвиг, 1985) as Gurenko
- Gardes-Marines, Ahead! (Гардемарины, вперёд!, 1987) as Nolken the Swedish ambassador
- A Man from the Boulevard des Capucines (Человек с бульвара Капуцинов, 1987) as Ballroom pianist
- The Criminal Quartet (Криминальный квартет, 1989) as Matvey Iosifovich Feldman
- Two Arrows. Stone Age Detective (Две стрелы. Детектив каменного века, 1989) as Drummer
- Back in the USSR (Назад в СССР, 1992) as Taxi driver
- Moscow Vacation (Московские каникулы, 1995) as Plane commander

=== Voice ===
- 1964: The Satin Street (Sitsevaya ulitsa)
- 1969: The Bremen Town Musicians
- 1973: A Tale of a Priest and His Workman Balda
- 1974: A №10 Tram was coming; How a Lion-cub and a Tortoise Sang a Song; The Land of Sannikov
- 1975: In the Port
- 1977: Dunno in the Sunny City
- 1979: Very Blue Beard
- 1981: Not Scary at All
- 1983: Kite in the Attic
