= Sergey Stepanchenko =

Soviet and Russian actor

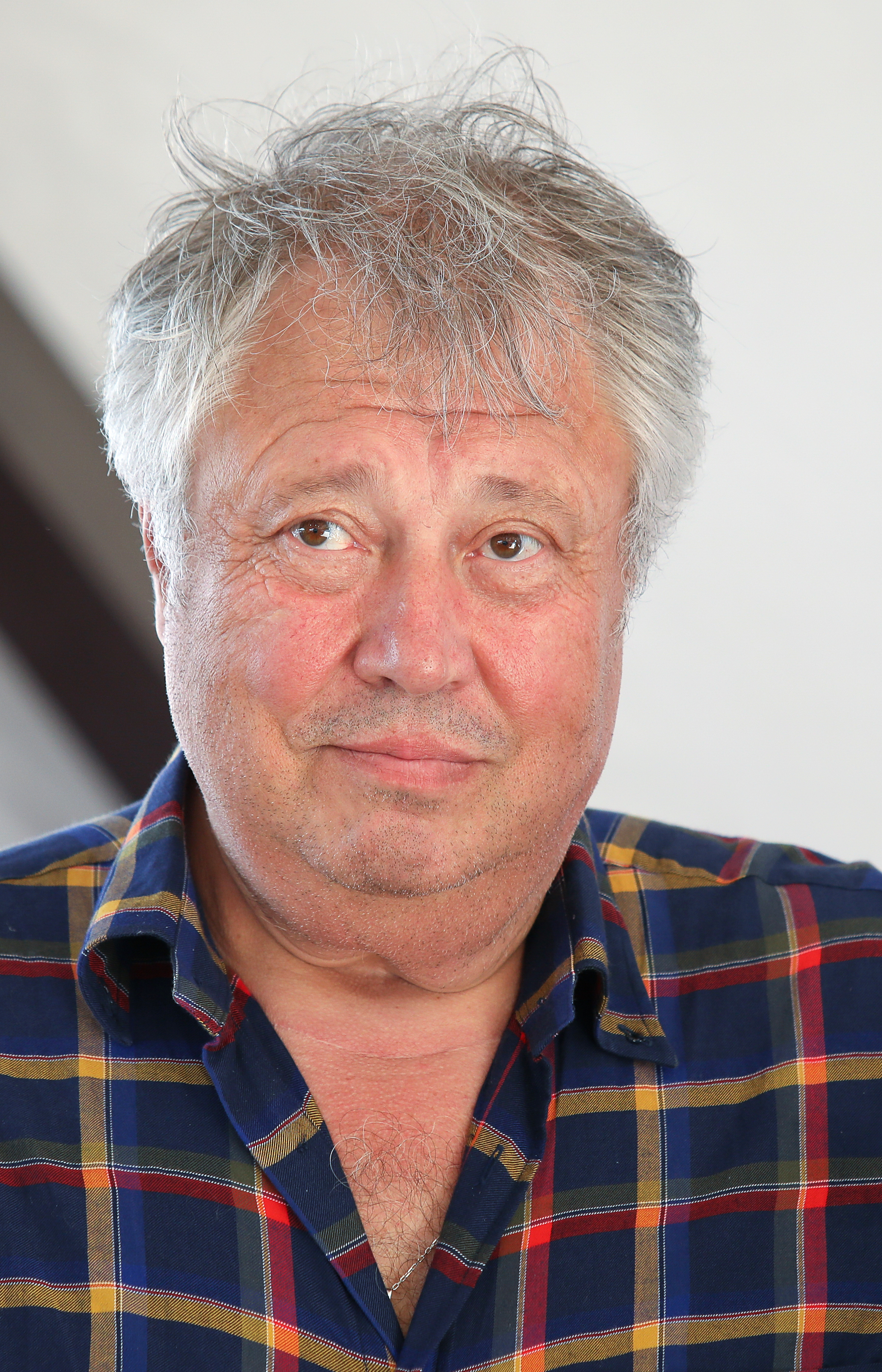
Stepanchenko in 2019

Sergei Yuryevich Stepanchenko (Russian: Серге́й Ю́рьевич Степа́нченко; born June 18, 1959, in Tatarsk, Novosibirsk Oblast) is a Soviet and Russian theater and film actor, film director. People's Artist of the Russian Federation (2005).

== Selected filmography ==
- Katala (1989) as Lola's lover, police officer
- Crazies (1991) as Fyodor
- Dreams of Russia (1992) as Boris, Yakov Nevidimov's servant
- Prediction (1993) as taxi driver
- Life and Extraordinary Adventures of Private Ivan Chonkin (1994) as Plechevoy
- Hello, Fools! (1996) as Stepan, bodyguard
- Schizophrenia (1997) as Ensign Kravchuk
- Contract with Death (1998) as Sergey
- Composition for Victory Day (1998) as Mikhalych
- Burnt by the Sun 2: The Citadel (2011) as lorry driver
- Kidnapping, Caucasian Style! (2014) as the 'Pro'
- Tobol (2019) as Ensign Kravchuk
- The Twelve Chairs (2021) as Father Fyodor
