= Fuss of the Fusses =

- Russian: Суета сует
- Directed by: Alla Surikova
- Written by: Emil Braginskiy
- Starring: Galina Polskikh; Mher Mkrtchyan; Leonid Kuravlyov; Anna Varpakhovskaya; Svetlana Petrosyants
- Cinematography: Vsevolod Simakov
- Music by: Bogdan Trotsyuk
- Release date: 1979
- Country: Soviet Union
- Language: Russian

Fuss of the Fusses (Russian: Суета сует) is a 1979 Soviet romantic comedy-drama film directed by Alla Surikova.

== Plot ==
The film tells about the registry office employee named Marina Petrovna. She registers happy marriages. And suddenly at work she sees her husband, who decides to leave her.

== Cast ==
- Galina Polskikh as Marina Petrovna
- Mher Mkrtchyan as Boris Ivanovich (as Frunze Mkrtchyan)
- Leonid Kuravlyov as Volodya
- Anna Varpakhovskaya as Liza
- Svetlana Petrosyants as Natasha
- Sergei Ivanov as Vasya
- Leonid Kharitonov as Yakov Andreyevich
- Lyudmila Ivanova as Serafina Ilinichna
- Yana Poplavskaya as Lidka
- Natalya Krachkovskaya as Varvara
