= Two Arrows. Stone Age Detective =

Two arrows. Stone Age Detective
- Directed by: Alla Surikova
- Written by: Alexander Volodin
- Starring: Alexander Kuznetsov; Armen Dzhigarkhanyan; Olga Kabo; Nikolai Karachentsov
- Cinematography: Grigory Belenky
- Music by: Gennady Gladkov
- Production company: Mosfilm
- Release date: 1989
- Running time: 94 min.
- Country: USSR
- Language: Russian

Two arrows. Stone Age Detective (Russian: Две стрелы. Детектив каменного века, romanized: Dve strely. Detektiv kamennogo veka) is a 1989 Soviet tragicomic crime film directed by Alla Surikova.

== Plot ==
The film is set in the Stone Age period. A crime is committed within a tribe: "Gaunt", an intellectual who was to speak at the tribal council, is killed. All suspicions fall on "Eared", a peaceful young man, a dreamy painter. A trial begins during which all witnesses give evidence against Eared. It would seem that everything is clear, Eared is guilty and death awaits him. However, when the accused himself takes the case, acting as a lawyer of himself, the situation dramatically changes.

It turns out that all the "witnesses" are lying. Moreover, it was they themselves who have committed this crime, for they were consumed by envy and anger towards Gaunt. "Ladies' man" was vying for Gaunt's wife, "Eloquent" envied the orator's glory of the deceased. But the main instigator of Gaunt's destruction was the right-hand man of the tribe's chief - the "Fighting man". This warrior does not need democracy nor justice; he craves absolute power and is ready to do anything to achieve his goal.

As Eared proves his innocence before the tribal council, he himself is fatally shot in the back by the unseen archers. At that, the chief declares that the tribe is doomed because of the infighting, abdicates and walks away. Fighting man becomes the new chief. "Long-nosed", a friend of Eared, raises his voice against the murderers, but is promptly killed as well in the same manner. Just as all dissent seems suppressed, an arrow is shot at Fighting man from behind. He manages to dodge the arrow, but is visibly shaken. Everyone realizes that the days of peace are gone.

== Cast ==
- Alexander Kuznetsov – "Eared", painter
- Olga Kabo – "Turtle", Eared's girlfriend
- Armen Dzhigarkhanyan – Head of the tribe
- Nikolai Karachentsov – "Fighting man"
- Leonid Yarmolnik – "Long-nosed"
- Sergey Shakurov – "Ladies' man"
- Stanislav Sadalsky – "Eloquent"
- Alexander Ivanov – "Gaunt"
- Natalya Gundareva – Gaunt's wife
- Maria Vinogradova – "Elderly"
- Nina Maslova – mistress of Ladies' man
- Viktor Ilichyov – "Hurried"
- Vladimir Nosik – "Long-haired"
- Oleg Anofriyev – "Drummer"
