= After the Rain, on Thursday =

1985 film directed by Mikhail Yuzovskiy

- Directed by: Mikhail Yuzovskiy
- Written by: Yuliy Kim
- Produced by: Yulia Bondareva
- Starring: Vladislav Toldykov; Alexey Voytyuk; Gennady Frolov
- Cinematography: Konstantin Harutyunov; Vladimir Sapozhnikov
- Edited by: Svetlana Desnitskaya
- Music by: Gennady Gladkov
- Production company: Gorky Film Studio
- Release date: 1985
- Running time: 78 minutes
- Country: Soviet Union
- Language: Russian

After the Rain, on Thursday (Russian: После дождичка в четверг, romanized: Posle dozhdichka v chetverg) is a 1985 Soviet musical children's fantasy film directed by Mikhail Yuzovskiy. The film is based on the libretto by A. N. Ostrovsky for an unwritten opera, reworked by Yuliy Kim.

== Plot ==
One Thursday after a rain, Tsar Avdei’s son is born, as well as the son of his housekeeper Varvara, and a foundling discovered among cabbage in the garden. All three boys are named Ivan, and the Tsar decrees they be raised together. However, Varvara switches her son with the Tsar’s in the royal crib, sending the real prince and the foundling to a labor camp. Twenty years later, the false prince, encouraged by Varvara, now a powerful figure at court, begins plotting to seize the throne. Suspicious of him, Tsar Avdei withholds his approval. Varvara then visits her brother Yegory, who oversees the labor camp, convincing him to eliminate the two Ivans. Overhearing the scheme, the real prince and the foundling escape on a flying carpet.

Back at court, Varvara pressures Avdei to declare the throne will pass to the false prince. To delay, Avdei decrees that Ivan can only inherit the kingdom if he rescues Princess Milolika, who is held captive by the immortal Koschei. Many volunteers, including the false prince and Yegory, set out for Koschei’s lair, hoping to ransom Milolika or win her freedom by gambling with enchanted checkers. Meanwhile, the real prince and foundling, after a run-in with Baba Yaga, use trickery to charm Koschei and locate Milolika. When Koschei captures them, he offers a deal: he’ll spare the prince if the foundling retrieves the Firebird from a distant shah. Upon seeing the cruelty the Firebird endures in captivity, the foundling persuades it to help. While he races back, the prince, with Milolika’s aid, locates the crystal egg containing Koschei’s death. With the Firebird’s support, the two Ivans finally corner Koschei, who unwittingly destroys the egg himself. The evil dissipates, restoring all prisoners to their true forms. The Tsar, learning of Varvara's deception, forgives the real prince and banishes Varvara, as peace returns to the kingdom.

== Cast ==
- Vladislav Toldykov as Ivan Tsarevich
- Alexey Voytyuk as Ivan the Foundling
- Gennady Frolov as Ivan, Varvara's son
- Oleg Tabakov as Koschei the Immortal
- Valentina Talyzina as Varvara
- Marina Zudina as Milolika
- Oleg Anofriyev as King Avdey
- Marina Yakovleva as Firebird
- Tatyana Pelttser as grandmother-watchman on the swamp (Baba Yaga)
- Yury Medvedev as Yegory
- Semyon Farada as Shah Babadur
- Vladimir Fyodorov as hairy one
- Vasily Kortukov as royal jester
- Maria Barabanova as first nurse
- Natalya Krachkovskaya as second nurse
- Vladimir Yepiskoposian as servant of Babadur
- Georgy Millyar as courtier of Babadur
- Sergey Nikolayev as shooter
- Yuri Chernov as herald
- Viktor Mamaev as villain with a scar
- Yuliy Kim as swindler
- Mikislav Yuzovsky as guardsman in penal servitude
