= Moscow Vacation =

- Russian: Московские каникулы
- Directed by: Alla Surikova
- Written by: Emil Braginsky
- Produced by: Yuri Ginzburg; Leonid Yarmolnik
- Starring: Irina Seleznyova; Leonid Yarmolnik; Natalya Gundareva; Oleg Tabakov; Leonid Yakubovich
- Cinematography: Vladimir Nakhabtsev
- Edited by: Inessa Brozhovskaya
- Music by: Andrey Makarevich
- Production company: Mosfilm
- Release date: 1995
- Running time: 88 min.
- Country: Russia
- Language: Russian

Moscow Vacation (Russian: Московские каникулы, romanized: Moskovskie kanikuly) is a 1995 Russian romantic comedy film directed by Alla Surikova. and written by Emli Braginsky. Starring Irina Seleznyova, Leonid Yarmolnik, Natalya Gundareva, Oleg Tabakov,

== Plot ==
Italian heiress Luciana Farrini arrives in Russia to fulfill her grandmother’s last wish: bury her beloved dog on Russian soil. However, a misunderstanding at Sheremetyevo Airport leads the staff to believe the dog died mid-flight, resulting in a mix-up where Luciana is handed a stray dog instead. Confused but dedicated to the mission, Luciana encounters Grisha, a warm-hearted Moscow taxi driver who also works as a researcher at an institute. Grisha, intrigued by Luciana's eccentric request, agrees to help her. He takes her to a hotel, only for them to be turned away due to the dog’s lack of vaccination records. As Luciana hesitates to abandon the stray, which she whimsically names "Surprise", Grisha offers to accommodate her, though his modest communal apartment proves quite a shock to Luciana. Despite the cultural and lifestyle differences, the two grow closer as they explore Moscow together, experiencing humorous entanglements with local police, encounters with street poets, and even a heartfelt vodka toast with two philosophical strangers. By day’s end, Luciana finds herself unexpectedly attached to both Surprise and the unassuming but kind Grisha.

Their bond is further tested when Luciana reconnects with an Italian trade minister, Maurizio Costellani, who has arrived with a delegation. Persuaded by Maurizio to attend a formal Kremlin event, Luciana briefly loses sight of her connection to Grisha. Grisha, heartbroken and assuming he’s lost her, boldly enters the event disguised with a government medal he once received and dramatically dons an orange work vest on her during a tango, a symbolic gesture that stuns the guests and embarrasses Luciana. Enraged, Luciana lashes out, saying, "I hate you", to which Grisha responds, "Mutual". Soon after, as Luciana prepares to leave Russia, she stops by Grisha's apartment to apologize and asks to take Surprise with her. But Grisha, too hurt to respond, hides, leaving her to depart with a final confession of love. Only later does Grisha discover her forgotten belongings and, realizing his feelings, races to the airport in disguise, even commandeering a police car in his mad dash. As Luciana’s plane begins to taxi, she abruptly tries to halt the flight, only to discover Grisha and Surprise in the economy cabin. The two share a heartfelt reunion, sealing their romance in an unexpected happy ending above the clouds.

== Cast ==
- Irina Seleznyova as Luciana Farini
- Leonid Yarmolnik as Grisha
- Natalya Gundareva as Dusya
- Oleg Tabakov as Maurizio
- Leonid Yakubovich as Chief of Police Department
- Liya Akhedzhakova as swindler
- Armen Dzhigarkhanyan as airline representative
- Marina Dyuzheva as Grisha's ex-wife
- Sergey Nikonenko as airport employee
- Oleg Anofriyev as aircraft commander
- Aleksandr Adabashyan as Sanya
- Natalya Krachkovskaya as hotel administrator on duty
- Vladimir Grammatikov as traffic police officer
- Lyudmila Ivanova as female passenger on the plane
- Pyotr Podgorodetsky as pianist in the Kremlin
