= Funny Stories =

- Russian: Весёлые истории
- Directed by: Venyamin Dorman
- Written by: Viktor Dragunsky
- Produced by: Victor Freilich
- Starring: Mikhail Kislyarov; Aleksandr Kekish; Nadezhda Fomintsina; Yelena Druzhinina; Vitali Bondarev
- Cinematography: Konstantin Arutyunov
- Music by: Aleksandr Flyarkovsky
- Release date: 1962
- Country: Soviet Union
- Language: Russian

Funny Stories (Russian: Весёлые истории) is a 1962 Soviet children's comedy film directed by Venyamin Dorman. It is the first film adapted from Victor Dragunsky's popular children's book The Adventures of Dennis, a collection of short stories told from the perspective of a young boy.

== Plot ==
The film tells about three children living in an ordinary courtyard Moscow. They love to visit the circus and the zoo, but they do not tolerate the building manager, who always watches them and does not allow them to perform various circus tricks in the yard.

== Cast ==
- Mikhail Kislyarov as Deniska Korablyev (as Misha Kislyarov)
- Aleksandr Kekish as Mishka Slonov (as Sasha Kekish)
- Nadezhda Fomintsina as Alenka (as Nadya Fomintsina)
- Yelena Druzhinina as Lenochka (as Lena Druzhinina)
- Tamara Loginova as Antonina Korablyeva
- Georgi Tusuzov as Yubilyar (as G. Tusuzov)
- Yury Medvedev as Avdomkim Ivanovich upra (as Yu. Medvedev)
- Oleg Anofriyev as Fedka
- Vadim Zakharchenko as militiaman
- Sergey Martinson
- Emma Treyvas
