= Nina Ter-Osipyan =

Soviet and Russian stage and film actress (1909–2002)

Nina Mamikonovna Ter-Osipyan (Russian: Нина Мамиконовна Тер-Осипя́н, Armenian: Նինա Մամիկոնի Տեր-Օսիպյան; 5 April 1909 — 24 July 2002) was a Soviet and Russian theater and film actress. People's Artist of the RSFSR (1972).

== Early life and education ==
Nina Ter-Osipyan was born on 5 April 1909 in Baku. From 1918 the Ter-Osipyan family lived in Saratov. At the age of ten, she moved with her parents to Moscow. Ter-Osipyan studied at the "School of Juniors" a children's studio at the Theater of the Revolution, and from the very first years, she began to appear on the stage of this theater.

== Career ==
Ter-Osipyan played Kukushkina in Aleksandr Ostrovsky's A Profitable Position staged by Vsevolod Meyerhold. In the following years, she played minor roles in the famous performances of the Theater of the Revolution Romeo and Juliet and Tanya.

Shortly after the start of World War II, the theater was evacuated to Tashkent. Ter-Osipyan was sent to Moscow due to illness and performed on the stage of the Drama Theater the only theater that worked in the half-empty capital. At the end of the war, the Theater of Revolution was merged with this theater and became known as the Mayakovsky Theater, in which Ter-Osipyan played until the end of her life.

Ter-Osipyan was one of the leading actresses in the theater. She created vivid and memorable images in the performances Front, Ordinary Man, Thunderstorm, Legend of Love, and Uncle's Dream.

Ter-Osipyan also starred in the cinema. She played the role of Ashura in the film Mountain Woman, Aunt Pasha in A Woman from Afar, a neighbor in Five Evenings and many more. She also played in episodes in the films Sinegoria, Sicilian Defence, Look for a Woman, A Somersault Over the Head, Kin-dza-dza!, and Passport.

Among the latest works of the actress in the cinema are a colorful fairy grandmother in the film Nastya by Georgy Danelia and Yossi's mother in Eldar Ryazanov's film Old Hags (2000).

Nina Ter-Osipyan died on 24 July 2002, in Moscow at the age of 94. She was buried at the Armenian cemetery in Moscow.

== Selected filmography ==
- 1978 — Five Evenings as Nina Mamikonovna, Tamara's neighbor (the character was named after the actress)
- 1979 — There Was a Piano-Tuner... as Nika's grandmother
- 1982 — Look for a Woman as Madame Tashar
- 1986 — Kin-dza-dza! as Paje's mother
- 1986 — Jaguar as Teresa's aunt, dressmaker
- 1990 — Passport as Uncle Easy's mother
- 1990 — Deja Vu as old Armenian woman
- 1993 — Nastya as kind sorceress
- 2000 — Old Hags as Yossi's mother

== Awards and honors ==
- Honored Artist of the RSFSR (1954)
- Order of the Badge of Honor
- People's Artist of the RSFSR (1972)
- Order of Honor (1998)
