= Alexander Kuznetsov (actor) =

Russian American actor (1959–2019)

- Born: Alexander Konstantinovich Kuznetsov; December 2, 1959; Petrovka, Primorsky Krai, Soviet Union (now in Russian Far East)
- Died: June 6, 2019 (aged 59); Moscow, Russia
- Occupation: Actor
- Years active: 1981–2019

Alexander Konstantinovich Kuznetsov (Russian: Александр Константинович Кузнецов; December 2, 1959 – June 6, 2019) was a Russian American actor.

== Biography ==
Kuznetsov was born in the USSR in Petrovka, a small village in Primorsky Krai on the Sea of Japan. He graduated from Schukin Theatrical College. Alexander Kuznetsov made his first appearance in a movie in 1983. He starred in many Russian movies and TV series. Kuznetsov also had a starring role as the titular character in Jack Vosmyorkin, American.

Aleksander Kuznetsov was a key member of the Malaya Bronnaya Theater (1985–1989). He worked in Russia as well as in the United States. He had roles in a number of American television shows, including Nikolai Kossoff in NYPD Blue, as Victor in Crossing Jordan, Capt. Alex Volkonov in JAG and Kazimir Shcherbakov in Alias. Another of his notable roles was the terrorist Ostroff on the thriller series 24.

In 2000 he starred opposite Dolph Lundgren in Agent Red.

In 2014, the actor was diagnosed with cancer. He died on 6 June 2019 in Moscow, Russia. The farewell ceremony for the actor was held on 11 June at the Moscow House of Cinema. His ashes were interred at the Khovanskoye Cemetery (section 535).

== Selected filmography ==
- Believe It or Not (1983) as Neznam
- Aelita, Do Not Pester Men! (1988) as Fedya Sidorov
- Two Arrows. Stone Age Detective (1989) as Eared
- Frenzied Bus (1990) as flight engineer
- The Alaska Kid (1993) as Stine
- The Ice Runner (1993) as Petrov
- Beverly Hills, 90210 (1993) as Russian Man
- JAG (TV, 1997-2001) as Capt. Alex Volkonov / Pilot / Commander Yuri Kretchiak
- The Peacemaker (1997) as Russian Controller
- Seven Days (1999) as Yuri Grigorievich
- The Dukes of Hazzard: Hazzard in Hollywood (TV, 2000) as Igor the Terrible
- Space Cowboys (2000) as Russian Engineer
- Agent Red (2000) as Dr. Nikolai Kretz
- Crossing Jordan (TV, 2001) as Viktor
- Alias (2001-2005) as Assault Team Leader / Kazimir Shcherbakov
- NYPD Blue (TV, 2001) as Nikolai Kossoff
- The D.A. (2004) as Sergius Kovinsky
- Shadow Boxing (2005) as Zmey
- Into the West (TV, 2005) as Kurchenko
- Mirror Wars: Reflection One (2005) as Agent Sea
- 24 (2006) as Ostroff
- Lucky You (2007) as Russian Player
- Spy (2012) as Yepanchin
