= It (1989 film) =

- Russian: Оно
- Directed by: Sergei Ovcharov
- Screenplay by: Sergei Ovcharov
- Based on: The History of a Town; 1870 novel by Mikhail Saltykov-Shchedrin
- Produced by: Aleksandr Pikunov
- Starring: Rolan Bykov; Natalya Gundareva; Svetlana Kryuchkova; Elena Sanayeva; Margarita Terekhova
- Cinematography: Valeri Fedosov
- Edited by: Alexander Pikunov
- Music by: Sergey Kuryokhin
- Production company: Lenfilm
- Release date: 1989
- Running time: 124 minutes
- Country: Soviet Union
- Language: Russian

It (Russian: Оно, romanized: Ono) is a 1989 Soviet historical comedy-drama film directed by Sergei Ovcharov and based on the satirical novel The History of a Town by Mikhail Saltykov-Shchedrin. While Saltykov-Shchedrin's novel was written in the 19th century, It was filmed as a satire on the Soviet Union, which is portrayed in the film in a dystopian and surreal way.

== Plot ==
The film tells the story of the development of the city of Glupov.

== Cast ==
- Rolan Bykov as Ferdyshchenko
- Natalya Gundareva as Klementinka de Burbon
- Svetlana Kryuchkova as Amaliya Stokfish
- Elena Sanayeva as Iraida
- Margarita Terekhova as Anelka Lydohovskaya
- Yury Demich as Ugryum-Burcheev
- Leonid Kuravlyov as Borodavkin
- Rodion Nakhapetov as Erast Grustilov
- Oleg Tabakov as Brudasty
- Olga Pashkova as Alyona Osipova
- Vladimir Kashpur as Baibakov
- Oleg Shtefanko as Dmitry Prokofiev
- Vera Glagoleva as Pfeifersha
- Viktor Bychkov as Voblushkin
- Aleksandr Galibin as holy fool
