= Along Unknown Paths =

- Directed by: Mikhail Yuzovsky
- Written by: Alla Akhundova
- Starring: Roman Monastyrsky; Tatyana Aksyuta; Tatyana Pelttser
- Cinematography: Oleg Kobzev
- Edited by: Nina Bozhikova
- Music by: Vladimir Dashkevich
- Production company: Gorky Film Studio
- Release date: 1982
- Running time: 67 minutes
- Country: Soviet Union
- Language: Russian

Along Unknown Paths (Russian: Там, на неведомых дорожках..., romanized: Tam, na nevedomykh dorozhkakh) is a 1982 children's fantasy film directed by Mikhail Yuzovsky based on the novel Down by the Magic River by Eduard Uspensky.

== Plot ==
Young boy Mitya visits his great-aunt, the witch Baba Yaga, to deliver her a present from his grandmother. On the way through the forest lurks Likho, a one-eyed evil and makes him fall but does not pursue him further. Baba Yaga's neighbor, the swamp Kikimora, soon arrives, and together they gaze in the magic dish and observe what is going on in the Tsarist kingdom. The good Tsar Makar suffers from the strict rules imposed on him; he would like to clean the floor or even drive the manure wagon, but the strict scribe Chumichka does not allow him that. At the meeting with the Council of the Tsar, the Tsar learns that the wise Vasilisa has sent him a magic ball as a gift, but Chumichka denies that such a gift has arrived. The magic ball is found in the scribe's hat, which causes him to be thrown out of town for theft. He vows to free Koschei the Immortal in revenge against the Tsar. The image of the magic dish turns red, because a three-headed dragon has awakened, thus cutting the connection. Mitya and Baba Yaga decide to tell the Tsar about the scribe's plan and travel to the Tsar kingdom on a magic stove - without any water supply, as Mitya accidentally filled goat's water into the drinking bottle, which turns every drinker into a goat.

In the meantime, the scribe frees Koschei who is trapped in jail, gives him twelve buckets of water through which he regains his strength, and then guides him back into jail. Koschei can win over all the servants of the Tsar by duplicitous speeches for himself and finally receives the Tsar's crown. Tsar Makar is captured and Baba Yaga who rushed to the scene is also thrown into prison. Mitya receives the magic ball from Makar, which should lead him directly to the wise Vasilisa, who should advise him. In the meantime, the greatest criminals of the tsarist empire, who are friends of Koschei, including Likho, Nightingale the Robber, and the three-headed dragon, arrive at the court.

Mitya arrives to the wise Vasilisa, who gives him a cap of invisibility, with the help of which he can enter the castle unrecognized and also free the prisoners. Vasilisa's Domovoy, house-spirit, meanwhile, makes his way to the beach, where the death of the allegedly immortal Koschei is supposed to be hidden: according to tradition, he is in a duck, which is in a bear, which in turn is in a box on a tree. Mitya can instigate strife between the guards of Koschei and free Baba Yaga in the castle, but is locked up in jail by the scribe Chumichka together with the Tsar. Both are to be thrown to the three-headed dragon for feeding, but the Tsar manages to administer goat water to the dragon, so that he becomes a three-headed goat. Baba Yaga meanwhile flies under the radar of the guards by using the cloak of invisibility and they all return to wise Vasilisa. Here, too, Domovoy has returned from his journey to the beach and cursing the inaccurate transmission about the death of Koschei. He was not hidden directly in the duck, but in a needle that was in the egg in the duck. Although the Domovoy could destroy the egg transformed as a hawk, the needle had fallen into a haystack and is untraceable. Mitya gets a pair of scissors and rides his bike to the haystack to catch the needle with his scissors ready. Between Koschei and his mischief and Vasilisa and her followers, there is a fight at a bridge that ends with Koschei fleeing. He is chased by Vasilisa's warriors, but proves to be too strong. Only when Mitya finds the needle with the help of the pair of scissors and extinguishes its glowing head does Koschei lose his strength and can be captured.

Mitya gives Baba Yaga the now normal needle. She puts it in a pine needle and packs it into a wooden duck, which in turn transforms into a real duck. While Mitya teaches Vasilisa cycling, Baba Yaga explains to the astonished Swamp Kikimora why she did this: she does not like it when fairytales end.

== Cast ==
- Roman Monastyrsky — Mitya Sidorov
- Tatyana Aksyuta — Vassilisa Afanasyevna the Wise
- Tatyana Pelttser — Baba Yaga, she is also Varvara Yegorovna
- Elizaveta Nikishchihina — Kikimora
- Leonid Kharitonov — the Tsar Makar
- Alexander Kuznetsov — Uncle Domovoy
- Aleksandr Filippenko — Koschei
- Yuri Chernov — Chumichka, tsarist scribe
- Yuri Medvedev — Gavrila
- Leonid Kanevsky — Desyatnik Millionskiy
- Alexander Pyatkov — Drema
- Oleg Anofriyev — Nightingale the Robber
- Anastasia Zuyeva — Glafira Andreevna, Mitya's grandmother
- Natalya Krachkovskaya — aunt with buckets
- George Martirosyan — hero
- Sergei Nikolaev — 1st guard
- Elena Ozertzova — Likho, a one-eyed evil
- Yury Chekulaev — boyarin
- Mychislau Yuzovsky — a boy at the court

== Trivia ==
This was the final film of actress Anastasia Zuyeva.
