= Be My Husband =

- Directed by: Alla Surikova
- Written by: Eduard Akopov
- Starring: Andrei Mironov; Elena Proklova
- Cinematography: Grigory Belenky
- Music by: Victor Lebedev
- Production company: Mosfilm
- Release date: 1981
- Running time: 87 min.
- Country: USSR
- Language: Russian

Be My Husband or (Russian: Будьте моим мужем, romanized: Budte moim muzhem) is a 1981 Soviet romantic comedy directed by Alla Surikova.

== Plot ==
Victor the pediatrician arrives on the Black Sea coast. He is finally on the vacation which he has been looking forward to for a long time. There are of course no free rooms in hotels, but the good-natured physician does not lose heart and decides to go camping. At the station, Victor by chance gets acquainted with a pretty woman, Natasha Kostikova, who, along with her young son, Ilya, also came for a vacation. Natasha rented a room for only one person, and to place her son there she decides to stage a performance. A "jealous husband" with the child should come to the resort and thus Natasha would be able to be lodged together with Ilya. The role of the "husband" Natasha offers to Victor, and he, after a little persuading, agrees. Albina Petrovna, the mistress of the house, dumbfounded by the appearance of unexpected guests, initially categorically refuses to provide them with housing, but Victor, giving the hostess a small medical consultation and thereby winning her favor, manages to settle everything.

The mistress of the house where the "spouses" are residing, is an authoritative and practical woman, who dreams only of one thing - buying a car. The money received from lodgers allows Albina Petrovna to buy a treasured car. But alas, the landlady suffers color blindness, and driving is forbidden to her. In a terrible frustration with the collapse of their grandiose plans, Albina Petrovna is ready to drive out all the guests, but resourceful Victor finds a way out of the predicament again. He offers the owner to collect money for a yacht, because in the sea Albina Petrovna will be able to drive her vehicle even without discerning color.

Meanwhile the holidays continue. Natasha is very fond of Victor, he secretly is in love with her, but Natasha categorically rejects all of his timid advances. Unexpectedly an unpleasant surprise happens: on the beach Victor loses his clothes and passport and is detained by the police. To help Victor out of this difficult predicament, Natasha makes an "official" statement that he is her husband. And then it becomes clear that the ridiculous game of "spouses" has developed into true love...

== Cast ==
- Andrei Mironov – Victor, pediatrician
- Elena Proklova – Natasha Kostikova
- Philipp Adamovich – Ilya Kostikov, Natasha's son
- Nina Ruslanova – Albina Petrovna, the mistress of the house
- Oleg Anofriyev – Spa visitor-veterinarian
- Nikolai Grinko – Spa visitor
- Mikhail Svetin – Spa visitor with Lapdog
- Valentina Voilkova – Spa visitor-newlywed
- Anton Tabakov – Spa visitor-newlywed
- Anna Varpahovskaya – Spa visitor-neighbor
- Natalya Krachkovskaya – Spa visitor-theater lover
- Georgy Shtil – Spa visitor
- Vladimir Basov – beach-gardener who lost his documents
- Baadur Tsuladze – policeman
