= Quadrille (1999 film) =

- Russian: Кадриль
- Directed by: Viktor Titov
- Written by: Vladimir Gurkin; Viktor Titov
- Produced by: Aleksandr Litvinov; Vladimir Menshov; Natalya Popova
- Starring: Oleg Tabakov; Lyubov Polishchuk; Stanislav Lyubshin; Valentina Telichkina; Nina Usatova
- Cinematography: Valeri Myulgaut
- Music by: Nikolai Martynov
- Release date: 1999
- Country: Russia
- Language: Russian

Quadrille (Russian: Кадриль) is a 1999 Russian comedy film directed by Viktor Titov.

== Plot ==
The film tells about two families who live in the Baikal village. Suddenly, two neighbors decided to swap their husbands.

== Cast ==
- Oleg Tabakov as Sanya Arefyev
- Lyubov Polishchuk as Lida Zvyagintseva
- Stanislav Lyubshin as Nikolay Zvyagintsev
- Valentina Telichkina as Valya Orefyeva
- Nina Usatova as Makeyevna
