= Once Upon a Time Twenty Years Later =

- Russian: Однажды двадцать лет спустя
- Directed by: Yuri Yegorov
- Written by: Arkady Inin; Yuri Yegorov
- Produced by: Aleksandr Kamensky
- Starring: Natalya Gundareva; Viktor Proskurin
- Cinematography: Aleksandr Kovalchuk; Nikolai Puchkov
- Edited by: Yanina Bogolepova
- Music by: Mark Fradkin
- Production company: Gorky Film Studio
- Release date: 1980
- Running time: 77 min.
- Country: Soviet Union
- Language: Russian

Once Upon a Time Twenty Years Later (Russian: Однажды двадцать лет спустя, romanized: Odnazhdy dvadtsat let spustya) is a 1980 Soviet comedy film directed by Yuri Yegorov.

== Plot ==
Twenty years after finishing school, former classmates gather for a reunion. Among them are a respected academic, a textbook author, a naval officer, a poet, a famous architect, and other professionals from various fields. Each is asked by a television host, also a former classmate, two questions: "What have you achieved in life?" and "What do you still hope for?"

Nadya Kruglova, the class president and pride of their school days, sits at her old desk, reflecting on her life with a sense of inadequacy. Listening to her classmates' impressive accomplishments, she feels self-conscious about her "ordinariness." A mother of ten, Nadya finds it difficult to answer these questions in simple terms; every moment of her life feels significant. She takes pride in her children and wants to tell her classmates that motherhood has been her life's purpose, though she doubts they will understand.

The film unfolds through Nadya’s memories as she searches for answers to these profound questions. At last, she proudly declares, "I am a mother!" Her classmates watch in awe as all ten of her children enter the classroom. Her husband gently places a jacket with the "Heroine Mother" medal on her shoulders, met by admiring remarks from her astonished peers.

== Cast ==
- Natalya Gundareva as Nadya Kruglova
- Viktor Proskurin as Kirill Kruglov
- Marina Yakovleva as Natasha Kruglova
- Yevgeni Lazarev as Yuri
- Oleg Efremov as рainter
- Valentina Titova as Elena
- Olga Gobzeva as poetess
- Aleksandr Potapov as Valery
- Igor Yasulovich as Tolya
- Valentin Smirnitskiy as Kolya
- Leonid Yakubovich as classmate
