= The Criminal Quartet =

- Russian: Криминальный квартет
- Directed by: Aleksandr Muratov
- Written by: Boris Giller
- Starring: Nikolai Karachentsov; Vladimir Steklov; Boris Shcherbakov; Vladimir Eryomin; Semyon Farada
- Cinematography: Konstantin Ryzhov
- Edited by: Eleonora Praksina
- Music by: Aleksandr Mikhaylov
- Production company: Mosfilm
- Release date: 1989
- Running time: 85 min.
- Country: Soviet Union
- Language: Russian

The Criminal Quartet (Russian: Криминальный квартет, romanized: Kriminalnyy kvartet) is a 1989 Soviet action film directed by Aleksandr Muratov.

== Plot ==
In May 1989, four friends who grew up together in an orphanage—investigator Semyon Portnoy, police officers Marat Mukhanov and Pyotr Saraev, and journalist Nikolai Larin—are drawn into a dangerous mission when Portnoy’s eight-year-old son, Anton, is kidnapped. Portnoy recently uncovered major fraud at a local shoe factory involving shipments of defective shoes and sealed off the factory’s warehouse. The factory's management, in retaliation, orchestrates Anton’s abduction and demands Portnoy lift the warehouse’s security in exchange for his son’s safety. With little time and no guarantee of Anton’s return, Portnoy calls on his old friends for help. Mukhanov manages to reroute a train car containing the defective goods to buy them time, Saraev intimidates an accomplice of the factory managers into revealing inside information, and Larin publishes an article on the substandard shoes to draw the criminals out, even risking his own safety when he’s kidnapped and then released.

The group then follows a trail of clues, ultimately confronting the criminals in an intense showdown. Larin recalls hearing Beatles songs while he was held captive, leading the friends to deduce the location—a pool—where they discover the factory heads hiding. During the standoff, one of the criminals reveals that Anton is held near the city’s water treatment plant, and gang members are already on their way to intercept the diverted train car. Mukhanov instructs the guards at the rail yard to hold their ground without revealing their police identities, while the four friends engage in a brutal fight at the treatment plant. Although Portnoy is injured, they overcome the gang, and Mukhanov negotiates with Anton’s captor, Uncle Lyova, to let him go in exchange for safe passage. Meanwhile, police capture the remaining gang members at the rail yard. The film concludes with mock-documentary titles revealing the fates of the characters and the downfall of the corrupt shoe factory.

== Cast ==
- Nikolai Karachentsov as Marat
- Vladimir Steklov as Semyon Portnoi, Investigator
- Boris Shcherbakov as Pyotr Sarayev
- Vladimir Yeryomin as Nikolay Larin
- Semyon Farada as Levkoev
- Oleg Anofriev as Matvey Iosifovich Feldman
- Alexey Sheynin as factory chief technologist
- Yuriy Katin-Yartsev as Semyon Moiseevich
- Nele Savichenko-Klimene as Lyusya, Portnoi's wife
- Boris Klyuyev as factory chief engineer
- Lev Prygunov as Lev
- Yuriy Nazarov as Dmitry, police officer
- Igor Yasulovich as Shakalov
- Vadim Spiridonov as Lobanov
- Ivan Muradkhanov as Anton, Portnoi's son

== Awards ==
- Cognac Festival du Film Policier (1990) — Audience Award
