= And Life, and Tears, and Love =

1983 Soviet drama film

- Russian: И жизнь, и слёзы, и любовь
- Directed by: Nikolay Gubenko
- Written by: Nikolay Gubenko
- Starring: Zhanna Bolotova; Yelena Fadeyeva; Fyodor Nikitin; Pyotr Shcherbakov; Sergey Martinson
- Cinematography: Leonid Kalashnikov
- Music by: Yuriy Levitin
- Production company: Mosfilm
- Release date: 1983
- Running time: 103 min.
- Country: Soviet Union
- Language: Russian

And Life, and Tears, and Love (Russian: И жизнь, и слёзы, и любовь, romanized: I zhizn, i slyozy, i lyubov...) is a 1983 Soviet drama film directed by Nikolay Gubenko.

== Plot ==
The film takes place in the house of veterans, in which people are very bored living. Suddenly, a new head doctor comes into the house and tries not only to treat the elderly, but also to restore their love of life and other people.

== Cast ==
- Zhanna Bolotova as Varvara
- Yelena Fadeyeva as Serbina
- Fyodor Nikitin as Pavel Andreyevich
- Pyotr Shcherbakov as Fedot Fedotovich
- Sergey Martinson as Yegoshkin (as Sergei Martinson)
- Yevgeny Yevstigneyev as Stepanych
- Ivan Kozlovsky as cameo
- Mikhail Brylkin as Chistov
- Kapitolina Ilyenko as Ptitsyna
- Aleksei Drozdov as Berdyayev
- Natalya Gundareva as Antonina Efimovna, cook
- Lyubov Sokolova as Polina Ivanovna
- Natalya Krachkovskaya as Masha
