= Offered for Singles =

- Directed by: Samson Samsonov
- Written by: Arkady Inin
- Produced by: Vyacheslav Budkevich
- Starring: Natalya Gundareva; Aleksandr Mikhailov; Tamara Syomina; Yelena Drapeko; Frunzik Mkrtchyan; Viktor Pavlov
- Cinematography: Viktor Yakushev
- Music by: Eugen Doga
- Production companies: Mosfilm; Creative association of comedy and musical films
- Release date: January 2, 1984 (USSR)
- Running time: 89 minutes
- Country: USSR
- Language: Russian

Offered for Singles (Russian: Одиноким предоставляется общежитие, romanized: Odinokim predostavlyaetsya obshchezhitiye) is a 1984 romantic comedy drama film directed by Samson Samsonov and written by Arkady Inin.

== Plot ==
Vera Golubeva, a textile mill worker, lives in a dormitory for women. In her spare time she plays matchmaker for the other women. Although she does this informally and for free, Vera goes at it professionally: studying the personals in the newspapers, she sends marriage proposals throughout the Soviet Union, and carefully selects suitors. But Vera herself is lonely: walking with brides in their weddings, she has already forgotten to dream about her own family happiness.

One day, in the strictly female dormitory appears a new Commandant, Viktor Petrovich - a picturesque former sailor. At some point in the past a woman left him, and from that point on he has regarded women with the utmost suspicion. At first he fights against the way things are done in the dormitory and tries to close Vera's marriage bureau. But eventually, Viktor begins to understand that Vera is the woman he has been looking for all his life.

== Cast ==
- Natalya Gundareva as Vera Nikolayevna Golubeva
- Aleksandr Mikhailov as Victor Petrovich Frolov, commander
- Tamara Syomina as Larisa Evgenievna, educator
- Yelena Drapeko as Nina
- Frunzik Mkrtchyan as Vartan
- Viktor Pavlov as Ilya Belenky
- Elena Mayorova as Ira Sanyko
- Vladimir Simonov as Mitya

== Awards ==
- The film won prizes CCF in Kyiv (1984) and the International Film Festival in Chamrousse (1985)
- Natalya Gundareva - best actress in 1984 in a poll of the magazine Soviet Screen
