= Natalya Krachkovskaya =

Soviet and Russian actress (1938–2016)

Natalia Krachkovskaya
- Наталья Крачковская
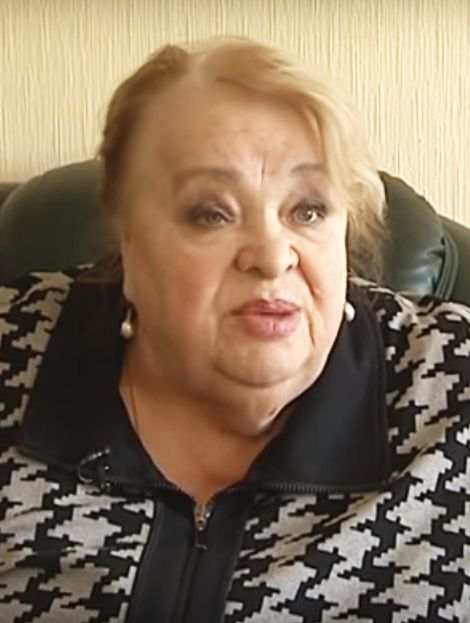
- Krachkovskaya in 2015
- Born: Natalia Leonidovna Belogortseva; 24 November 1938; Moscow, RSFSR, Soviet Union
- Died: 3 March 2016 (aged 77); Moscow, Russia
- Resting place: Troyekurovskoye Cemetery, Moscow
- Occupation: Actress
- Years active: 1959–2016
- Spouse: Vladimir Vasilievich Krachkovsky

Natalia Leonidovna Krachkovskaya (Russian: Ната́лья Леони́довна Крачковская, née Belogortseva; 24 November 1938 – 3 March 2016) was a Soviet and Russian actress, Meritorious Artist (1998). Belogortseva was born in Moscow, Soviet Union. After graduation, she submitted documents to VGIK on the course of Vladimir Belokurov.

In 1958, Natalia Belogortseva was married to sound engineer, Vladimir Krachkovsky. In marriage, their son Vasily was born (June 8, 1963). For more than 50 years of film career, Krachkovskaya starred in about 90 films. Usually she played minor, but characteristic roles. She became famous during the 1970s with roles in the movies The Twelve Chairs and Ivan Vasilievich: Back to the Future.

Natalia Krachkovskaya died on 3 March 2016 at the age of 77.

== Selected filmography ==
During her career Krachkovskaya had appeared in more than 90 movies and TV series.

- The Tale of the Agronomist (Повесть об агрономе, 1955) as Raechka
- In the Silence of the Steppe (В степной тиши, 1959) as secretary
- Russian Souvenir (Русский сувенир, 1960) as Natasha (uncredited)
- Battle on the Way (Битва в пути, 1961) as Verunka
- High Water (Половодье, 1962) as Klava, a milkmaid
- The Twelve Chairs (Двенадцать стульев, 1971) as Madame Gritsatsuyeva
- Nylon 100% (Нейлон 100%, 1973) as Henrietta, daughter of Konstantin
- Ivan Vasilievich: Back to the Future (Иван Васильевич меняет профессию, 1973) as Uliana Andreevna Bunsha
- Chipollino (Чипполино, 1973) as Cipolla
- This Merry Planet (Эта весёлая планета, 1973) as Butterfly
- Stories About Keshka and His Friends (Рассказы о Кешке и его друзьях, 1974) as Zhenya's mother
- Tsarevich Prosha (Царевич Проша, 1974) as Lushenka, court lady of Tsar Yermolai
- In the Country of Traps (В стране ловушек, 1975) as Vasilisa's mother
- Step Forward (film) (Шаг навстречу, 1975) as Claudia Simonenko, who won "Zaporozhets" ( Novel "Only 30 kopecks")
- It Can't Be! (Не может быть!, 1975) as Lelik wife, shopper paintings/guest at the wedding
- Two Captains (Два капитана, 1976) as a saleswoman of pies on a skating rink
- Ma-ma (Мама, 1976) as Bear (Romania, USSR, France)
- Entertainment for Ild people (Развлечение для старичков, 1976) as a host of the competition
- Incognito from St. Petersburg (Инкогнито из Петербурга, 1977) as fat lady, a guest of the mayor
- Heralds Victory (Предвещает победу, 1978) as Vanya's wife, villager
- The Investigation is Conducted by ZnaToKi. Until the Third Shot. Case No. 13 (Следствие ведут ЗнаТоКи. До третьего выстрела, 1978) as Nastasya, saleswoman
- Summer Tour (Летние гастроли, 1979) as Anzhelika Vasilievna, choreographer
- Foam (Пена, 1979) as Kochevryazhkin's wife
- Fuss of the Fusses (Суета сует, 1979) as Barbara
- A Piece of Sky (Пощёчина, 1980) as Maritza, a prostitute
- Keychain With a Secret (Брелок с секретом, 1981) as head of the hairdresser
- Emelino Grief. Auto Cairy Tale (Емелино горе. Автосказка, 1981) as Mother-in-law Emelya
- Be My Husband (Будьте моим мужем, 1981) as a Resort theater-goer
- Simply Awful! (Просто ужас!, 1982) as Raisa Nikolaevna, nurse at the veterinary clinic
- Along Unknown Paths (Там, на неведомых дорожках..., 1982) as Aunt with buckets
- The Pokrovsky Gate (Покровские ворота, 1982) as Olga Janovna Soyeva
- Take Care of the Men! (Берегите мужчин!, 1982) as Announcer at the local node of the research institute
- Vasily Buslaev (Василий Буслаев, 1982) as Okulikha
- Premonition of Love (Предчувствие любви, 1982) as Olga's mother
- Evenings on a Farm Near Dikanka (Вечера на Хуторе Близ Диканьки, 1983) as Ivan Fedorovich Shponka's aunt (Voiced by another actress)
- And Life, and Tears, and Love (И жизнь, и слёзы, и любовь, 1983) as Masha, nurse
- I Promise to Be! (Обещаю быть!,1983) as Representative of the patronage organization
- Legend of Love (Легенда о любви, 1984) as a woman in a caravan (USSR, India)
- Instruct General Nesterov... (Поручить генералу Нестерову, 1984) as Sofia
- The Feat of Odessa (Подвиг Одессы,1985) as Lyalya Shtakman, carriage driver
- Beauty Salon (Салон красоты, 1985) as Sofya Mikhailovna Krepkosolskaya, "hostess" of the ladies' beauty salon No. 84
- After the Rain, on Thursday (После дождичка в четверг, 1985) as second nurse
- Additional Arrives on the Second Path (Дополнительный прибывает на второй путь, 1986) as Saukova
- The Right People (Нужные люди, 1986) as Olya's housemate
- What is Yeralash? (Что такое ералаш?, 1986) as Lyoli's mother
- Wherever You Work... (Где бы ни работать, 1987) as Secretary of the Director of the Research Institute
- Stronger Than All Other Decrees (Сильнее всех иных велений, 1987) as Merchant
- The Circus has Arrived (Цирк приехал, 1987) as Pavla Pavlovna, owner of a hardware store
- A Man from the Boulevard des Capucines (Человек с бульвара Капуцинов, 1987) as Conchita, Diana Little's maid
- Noble Robber Vladimir Dubrovsk (Благородный разбойник Владимир Дубровский, 1988) as guest of Troekurov
- The Incident in Utinoozersk (Происшествие в Утиноозёрске, 1988) as the widow of a journalist
- One, two — Grief is not a Problem! (Раз, два — горе не беда! 1988) as a court lady
- Private Detective, or Operation Cooperation (Частный детектив, или Операция «Кооперация», 1989) as airliner lady passenger
- Rouen Maiden Nicknamed Pyshka (Руанская дева по прозвищу Пышка, 1989) as Burgher
- Swindlers (Аферисты, 1990) as Pavlina Vasilievna (Pava)
- Ravines (Овраги, 1990) as Klava's colleague
- KGB Agents Also Fall in Love (Агенты КГБ тоже влюбляются, 1991) as Klava, masseuse
- Talking Monkey (Говорящая обезьяна, 1991) as Crocodile buyer
- Don't Ask me About Anything (Не спрашивай меня ни о чём, 1991) as Nurse
- Once in Odessa, or How to Leave the USSR (Однажды в Одессе, или как уехать из СССР, 1991) as Nina Finkelstein
- For Whom the Prison is Crying... (По ком тюрьма плачет, 1991) as Alevtina Yakovlevna, director of the artel of the deaf-and-dumb
- Crazies (Чокнутые, 1991) as Eve, wife of a spy
- Smuggler (Контрабандист, 1991) as Misha's mother
- Wandering Stars (Блуждающие звёзды, 1991) as Hana (uncredited)
- Sin (Грех, 1992) as Watchman
- Ka-ka-du (Ка-ка-ду, 1992) as Petrov's wife
- Three Days of August (Три дня августа, 1992) as woman with a child
- Weather Is Good on Deribasovskaya, It Rains Again on Brighton Beach (На Дерибасовской хорошая погода, или На Брайтон-Бич опять идут дожди, 1992) as Monya's Wife
- Vitka Shusher and the Car (Витька Шушера и автомобиль, 1993) as Serafima Lvovna, physics teacher
- My Family Treasure (Моя семейная реликвия, 1993) as Widow (Russia, USA, Belarus)
- Russian Business (Русский бизнес, 1993) as Aunt Katya, huntsman
- Detective Bureau "Felix" (Сыскное бюро «Феликс», 1993) as Leikadia Grigoryevna, employee of the detective bureau "Felix"
- Master and Margarita (Мастер и Маргарита, 1994) as Navigator Georges/Sofya Petrovna, lady in Griboyedov
- Russian Miracle (Русское чудо, 1994) as Aunt Katya
- Russian Account (Русский счёт, 1994) as Klava
- Red Cherry (Красная вишня, 1995) as Aunt Tonya (Belarus, China, Russia)
- Moscow Vacation (Московские каникулы, 1995) as Administrator on duty at the hotel
- Strawberry (Клубничка, 1996) as Maria Ivanovna, neighbor
- Children of Monday (Дети понедельника, 1997) as Ice cream seller
- Old Songs About the Main Thing 3 (Старые песни о главном 3, 1997) as Ulyana Andreevna, Bunshi's wife
- The Game of Love (Игра в любовь, 2000) as Landlady
- The Hero of Her Novel (Герой ёё романа, 2001) as Aunt Katya
- The Perfect Couple (Идеальная пара, 2001) as Administrator (episode 6 "Features of Emotional Choices")
- Holiday Romance (Курортный роман, 2001) as Raisa (episode "Enchantment")
- Doctors (Медики, 2001) as Olga Ivanovna ( episode 6 "Ward No. 7")
- Kyshkin House (Кышкин дом, 2001–2003) as Thumbelina, diet specialist
- Beauty Queen, or a Very Difficult Childhood (Королева красоты, или Очень трудное детство, 2002) as Borka's grandmother
- The Elevator Leaves on Schedule (Лифт уходит по расписанию, 2002) as Vera Petrovna, Lyudmila's neighbor
- Nephew, or Russian Business 2 (Племянник, или Русский бизнес 2, 2002) as Aunt Manya, "clairvoyant healer"
- Anniversary of the Prosecutor (Юбилей арокурора, 2003) as Mother-in-law
- Life Somersault (Жизнь кувырком, 2003) as Wife of Sergei Stepanovich, "doll"
- The Secret of the Pharaoh (Секрет фараона, 2004) as Nefertiti, woman on a wheelchair
- Oversized (Крупногабаритные, 2005) as Svetlana Petrovna, salesperson
- Phenomenon (Феномен, 2005) as Ekaterina Moiseevna
- Moscow History (Московская история, 2006) as Frida, member of the admissions committee of the Faculty of Economics
