= Love with Privileges =

- Movie poster
- Directed by: Vladimir Kuchinsky
- Written by: Emil Braginsky; Valentin Chernykh
- Produced by: Viktor Glukhov; Vladimir Predybaylov
- Starring: Lyubov Polishchuk; Vyacheslav Tikhonov; Oleg Tabakov
- Cinematography: Felix Kefchiyan
- Music by: Alemdar Karamanov
- Production companies: Mosfilm; Studio Ekran
- Release date: 1989
- Running time: 135 minutes
- Country: Soviet Union
- Language: Russian

Love with Privileges (Russian: Любовь с привилегиями, romanized: Lyubov s privilegiyami) is a 1989 Soviet romantic drama film directed by Vladimir Kuchinsky.

== Plot ==
USSR, the end of the 80s. Former Deputy Chairman of the Council of Ministers Kozhemyakin comes to rest in Yalta. To meet him at the station is asked Irina, who works as a van driver. An accidental resort acquaintance suddenly turned into something more. Neither the age difference nor the social situation did not become a hindrance. Irina agrees to become Kozhemyakin's wife and moves to Moscow.

In Moscow, taking advantage of her husband's acquaintances, Irina inquires about the circumstances of her father’s arrest, who was repressed after the war and shot in 1952 (the family was sent to Vorkuta, the mother soon died there too). And it turns out that in Stalin's times her new husband was one of those who signed the letter of collective condemnation, after which her father was shot.

== Cast ==
- Lyubov Polishchuk as Irina Nikolaeva
- Vyacheslav Tikhonov as Konstantin Gavrilovich Kozhemyakin
- Oleg Tabakov as Nikolai Petrovich, KGB General
- Lidiya Fedoseyeva-Shukshina as Maria Spiridonovna
- Pyotr Shcherbakov as Mossovet vice-chairman
- Aleksandr Feklistov as Dr. Lev Petrovich
- Yuri Sarantsev as Dr. Kondakov
- Aleksandr Baluev as Kozhemyakin Jr.
- Galina Stakhanova as old-timer
- Alika Smekhova as waitress
- Fyodor Odinokov as General, Kozhemyakin's friend

== TV version ==
The duration of the TV version entitled City Details, released in 1990, is 157 minutes.
