= Look for a Woman =

- Written by: Svetlana Volodina
- Directed by: Alla Surikova
- Starring: Sofiko Chiaureli; Leonid Kuravlyov; Sergei Yursky; Aleksandr Abdulov
- Music by: Victor Lebedev
- Country of origin: Soviet Union
- Original language: Russian

Production
- Cinematography: Mikhail Agranovich
- Running time: 145 min.
- Production company: Mosfilm

Original release
- Release: 1983

Look for a Woman (Russian: Ищите женщину, romanized: Ishchite zhenshchinu) is a 1983 Soviet crime comedy television film adaptation of the play "La Perruche et le Poulet" by French writer Robert Thomas, which is, in turn, the French adaptation of "Busybody" by Jack Popplewell, directed by Alla Surikova.

== Plot ==
An ordinary day at a Parisian notary office comes to a tragic end. Telephonist of notary Rocher, Mademoiselle Alice Postic, stays late at the office to chat with her friend on the phone and ends up finding her boss in death's throes, with a dagger in his back. After calling the police, Alice faints, but when the policeman arrives, it turns out that the corpse has disappeared! Arriving on call, the police inspector Grandin turns out to be Alice's long-time acquaintance, but now he in every possible way disavows their love, which was once between him and Mademoiselle Postic. In connection with the murder an investigation begins and the notary together with his wife are the main suspects. But everything ends in the most ridiculous way: in the midst of interrogations, the "late" Rocher arrives in the office, who spent an evening at the opera!

Alice Postic becomes a subject of ridicule from colleagues and acquaintances. But suddenly she finds some foreign objects in the office, and later the police find the corpse of an unknown young man in a park near the notary's bureau. Linking the found objects with the death of the stranger, Alice begins her own investigation, in which she then helps, then interferes with her friend, Inspector Grandin. It turns out that the murdered young man is Jullien (Giuliano in Italian) Nalestro, lover of notary Rocher's wife. All the evidence indicates that the notary killed his rival out of jealousy. However, clever Alice suggests Grandin to set up a trap to catch the real killer.

== Cast ==
- Sofiko Chiaureli – Alice Postic, telephonist
- Leonid Kuravlyov – Henri Grandin, police inspector
- Sergei Yursky – Maître Rocher, head of the notary office
- Yelena Solovey – Clara Rocher, Maître Rocher's wife
- Aleksandr Abdulov – Robert de Charance, Maître Rocher's assistant
- Lyudmila Dmitrieva – Suzanne Brissard, Maître Rocher's personal secretary
- Yelena Ukrashchyonok – Virginie Renoir, typist
- Leonid Yarmolnik – Maximin, policeman
- Vladimir Basov – Monsieur Jacques-Pierre Antoine, sad client
- Nina Ter-Osipyan – Madam Tachard, cheerful client

== Filming ==
- All the locations mentioned in the movie do exist. At the address of Robert de Charance (19, Gobelen Street, Paris) there is a historic house, which is under the state's protection.
- At the beginning of each series, scenes from French films The Hunter Will Get You (1976) and Death of a Corrupt Man (1977) were used.
- The owner of the keyfob found by Alice Postic is first thought to be Maximin's friend Jacques Noiret then the missing Jullien Nalestro. The initials of both are JN, but on the keyfob the wrong initials are inscribed - GN.
- In one of the episodes a calendar is shown for the year 1982. In addition, Maître Rocher reports that the next year on a horoscope is the year of the Pig (in reality 1983 is the year of the Pig).
- In some episodes of the movie the names of the main characters differ from their real names. Alice calls herself and Inspector Grandin diminutive names which causes Alice to become Lily and Henri - Riri.
