= Passing Through Moscow =

- Russian: В Москве проездом…
- Directed by: Ilya Gurin
- Written by: German Drobiz; Boris Lobkov; Anna Paytyk; Lyudviga Zakrzhevskaya
- Starring: Yevgeny Karelskikh; Sergey Shakurov; Nikolay Merzlikin; Khodzhan Ovezgelenov; Lidiya Konstantinova; Vyacheslav Nevinnyy
- Cinematography: Yevgeny Davydov
- Edited by: Lidiya Zhuchkova
- Music by: Yan Frenkel
- Release date: 1970
- Country: Soviet Union
- Language: Russian

Passing Through Moscow (Russian: В Москве проездом…) is a 1970 Soviet romantic comedy-drama film directed by Ilya Gurin. This was Natalya Gundareva's debut film.

== Plot ==
The film consists of four short stories, each of which takes place in Moscow.

== Cast ==
- Yevgeny Karelskikh as Volodya
- Sergey Shakurov as Stepan
- Nikolay Merzlikin as Nikolay
- Khodzhan Ovezgelenov as Yashuli Aktylbek-aka
- Lidiya Konstantinova as Yulya Sinyova
- Vyacheslav Nevinnyy as Valentin
- Vera Kuznetsova as Klavdiya Yemelyanova
- Nadezhda Karpushina as Nina
- Valentina Egorenkova as Lena Yemelyanova
- Vsevolod Kuznetsov
- Oleg Anofriyev
