= A Man from the Boulevard des Capucines =

- Original film poster
- Directed by: Alla Surikova
- Written by: Eduard Akopov
- Starring: Andrei Mironov; Aleksandra Yakovleva; Nikolai Karachentsov; Oleg Tabakov; Mikhail Boyarsky; Igor Kvasha
- Cinematography: Grigori Belenky
- Edited by: Inessa Brozhovskaya
- Music by: Gennady Gladkov
- Production company: Mosfilm
- Distributed by: Sovexportfilm
- Release date: 23 June 1987
- Running time: 99 min
- Country: Soviet Union
- Language: Russian

A Man from the Boulevard des Capucines (Russian: Человек с бульвара Капуцинов, romanized: Chelovek s bulvara Kaputsinov) is a 1987 Red Western comedy film (Mosfilm production) directed by Alla Surikova, with nods to silent film and the transforming power of celluloid.

The film had the highest ratings in the Soviet Union in 1987, with 60 million viewers.

It became most successful film at the box office that was released in the USSR in 1987. The title of the film is a reference to the Paris address of the first establishment of Lumiere Brothers, the filmmaking trailblazers.

== Plot ==
Mr. John First (Johnny) is a cinematographer traveling to Santa Carolina city when he is stopped by a band of robbers, headed by Black Jack. Johnny is the only one who does not pull out a gun and fight during the midst of the action and is thus questioned by Black Jack as to why. He then takes the book which Johnny is so fervently looking through and ends up mistaking it for a Bible, until he notices that it contains several blank pages. Johnny explains that it is a book of World Cinema History. Black Jack quickly loses interest and rides away.

When Johnny arrives in Santa Carolina, he comes to the local bar, where a rowdy brawl soon begins. This is an everyday occurrence, as it is how Harry, the owner of the bar, makes a living by making a few hundred a day from damage. Johnny befriends a cowboy named Billy upon entering, and, while watching the dancers, completely falls in love with one named Diana. Billy laughs at him and warns him that "the heart of Miss [Diana] Little is locked tighter than Fort Knox". When Johnny stands up and asks the crowd if anyone has a white sheet, it is but Diana who is in possession of one. What happens next shocks everyone including Diana. Johnny, in all his gentlemanly ways, comes up to Diana, and respectfully kisses her hand. To a girl used to nothing like that, Diana is so pleasantly appalled that she adds that she has two white sheets, and both of them belong to Johnny.

It all goes downhill from there. When Johnny shows his movie on the white sheet, with the gentlemen who take ladies for walks and tip their hats and say "please" and "thank you", the unruly cowboys begin to change their ways. The only two who do not benefit from this are Harry, who has lost significant profit, and the local pastor, who wants Diana to love him. The latter is in a much worse position, for since Johnny had begun doting on Diana, being the first man in her life to bring her flowers or treat her like a lady in any way, she had completely fallen in love with him and said that her heart will always belong to him.

Although Harry does everything he can, from burning the shed where the films are, to asking Black Jack to murder Johnny, to stealing the white sheet on which the movies were shown, it all seems to slide off the cinematographer's back, until he leaves to find a wedding gift for his beloved Diana. When he returns, he finds all the cowboys reverted to their old ways, due to the coming of Mr. Second, who is also a cinematographer, who shows the cowboys movies with violence (similar to what was later named "splatter film").

Johnny, with a heavy heart, leaves for the prairie, as he is under the impression that even Diana has left him for the pastor. However, on the way there, he is met by Black Jack, who had seen Johnny's movies through the window and has changed his ways, and Diana, who had captured the pastor and put him at gunpoint and managed to escape. Johnny then leaves with them, determined to help more people see the beauty and new worlds which movies allow us to be in.

== Cast ==
- Andrei Mironov as Johnny First
- Aleksandra Yakovleva as Ms. Diana Little (singing parts by Larisa Dolina)
- Nikolai Karachentsov as Billy King
- Oleg Tabakov as Harry McKew
- Mikhail Boyarsky as Black Jack
- Igor Kvasha as pastor Adams
- Lev Durov as coffin maker
- Semyon Farada as Mr. Thompson
- Galina Polskikh as Mrs. Thompson
- Natalya Krachkovskaya as Conchita
- Spartak Mishulin as chief of the Comanches
- Natalya Fateyeva as chief's wife
- Albert Filozov as Mr. Second
- Mikhail Svetin as pharmacist
- Leonid Yarmolnik as one-eyed cowboy Martin
- Borislav Brondukov as Danly, stray cowboy
- Yuriy Dumchev as White Feather, chief's son
- Oleg Anofriyev as pianist

== Production ==
The genre of the film was defined by director Alla Surikova and screenwriter Eduard Akopov as "an ironic fantasy in a western style". Surikova later admitted that the film did not start for her from the script, but from the moment she realized that Andrei Mironov should play Mr. First, who decided to change the world with the help of cinema. Initially, Mironov did not like the script, and Surikova took the actor into a real siege; after learning that the script had been lying on the shelf of Mosfilm for 5 years and the director did not see anyone except Mironov in this role, Mironov was touched and gave his consent. In his interview before leaving for a tour in the Baltic States, Mironov said: "Something immediately bribed me in the First, made friends with him. And the fact that he is a Don Quixote in his own way, and the fact that, if I may say so, he is not just an eccentric, but a very peculiar lucky loser or unlucky lucky man".

Mironov joined the work on the picture much earlier than the performer usually does, at the stage of the first estimates of the director's script. He fantasized a lot, thinking not only about the image of the main character, but also about the biographies and actions of other characters, argued with the director. According to Surikova, Mironov found "the most expressive and accurate completion" of the screen fate of the Diana Little. Aleksei Zharkov was almost already approved for the role of Billy King, and the director offered Nikolai Karachentsov to play Black Jack, but the actor found this offer uninteresting, and he asked for Billy King, convincing the director to audition for a staged fight with head stuntman Alexander Inshakov. In order to quickly find an actor for the role of Black Jack, Surikova went to a trick — calling Mikhail Boyarsky, she said that Mironov personally wanted to see him in this role.

The filming took place in the Crimea, in the vicinity of the White Rock, and on the shore of a Tikhaya bay.

The film contains references to many classic westerns and some other films. The official poster of the film parodies the canvas of the Sistine Madonna. This is the last film in which Andrei Mironov played the main role.

== Reviews ==
According to Nadezhda Lagina (Evening Moscow) the character created by Mironov turned out to be surprisingly bright and charming. His quiet voice affects others more than the roar of a fight and gunshots. In the most incomprehensible way, he makes everyone stop for a moment and think about himself. And before First struck the saloon regulars with an unknown cinematography, showing on a white sheet the frames of the world's first Lumiere program ("L'Arrivée d'un train en gare de La Ciotat", "L'Arroseur arrosé"), he had already impressed them with his charm and sublime nobility. The unbridled saloon is unrecognizably transformed, and their best qualities are revealed in people. But this transformation did not happen for long, because cinema, as it turned out, is heterogeneous. First leaves the town, but still leaves light in the souls of its inhabitants.

== Soundtrack ==
Музыка к кинофильму «Человек с бульвара Капуцинов»

Soundtrack album by Gennady Gladkov
- Released: 1988
- Length: 38:51
- Label: Melodiya
- Producer: Vladimir Ryzhikov

External videos
- Diana u Kinoproektora

External videos
- Cinema, Cinema!

External videos
- Byla ne Byla

All music is composed by Gennady Gladkov

No.	Title	Artist	Length
1.	"Vsyo Prekrasno"	Larisa Dolina
2.	"Daleka Doroga Tvoya"	Mikhail Boyarskiy
3.	"Dilizhans" (instrumental)	State Symphony Cinema Orchestra
4.	"Lyublyu Kovboya"	Larisa Dolina
5.	"Boy s Indeitsami" (instrumental)	State Symphony Cinema Orchestra
6.	"Volshebniy Luch"	Larisa Dolina
7.	"Cinema"	Andrei Mironov
8.	"Progulka v Preriyakh" (instrumental)	State Symphony Cinema Orchestra
9.	"Diana u Kinoproektora"	Larisa Dolina
10.	"Prelyudia" (instrumental)	State Symphony Cinema Orchestra
11.	"Byla ne Byla"	Boyarskiy, Mironov, Dolina
12.	"Pastoral" (instrumental)	State Symphony Cinema Orchestra
13.	"Vsyo Koncheno" (album only)	Andrei Mironov
