= Yelena Drapeko =

Russian actress (born 1948)

Yelena Drapeko MP
- Елена Драпеко
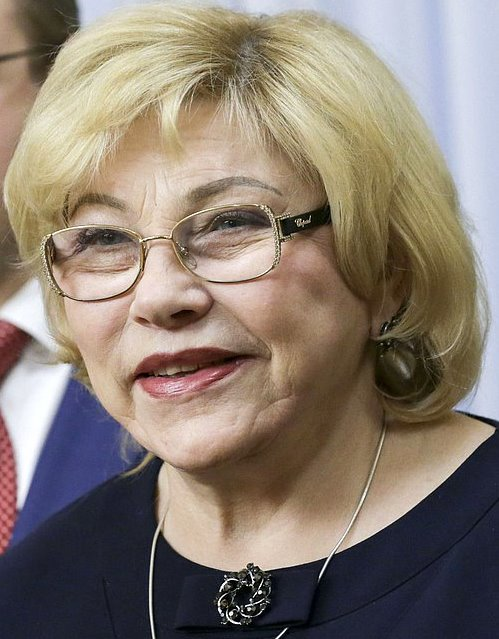

Member of the State Duma for Saint Petersburg
- Incumbent
- Assumed office 5 October 2016
- Preceded by: constituency re-established
- Constituency: Northeast St. Petersburg (No. 214)

Member of the State Duma (Party List Seat)
- In office 18 January 2000 – 5 October 2016

Personal details
- Born: 29 October 1948 (age 77) Uralsk, West Kazakhstan Oblast Kazakh SSR, USSR
- Party: SRZP (from 2006); CPRF (until 2004)
- Spouse: Oleg Alexandrovich Belov (m. 1978; div. 1991)
- Children: Anastasia (born 1984)
- Education: LGITMiK
- Occupation: Actress; Politician
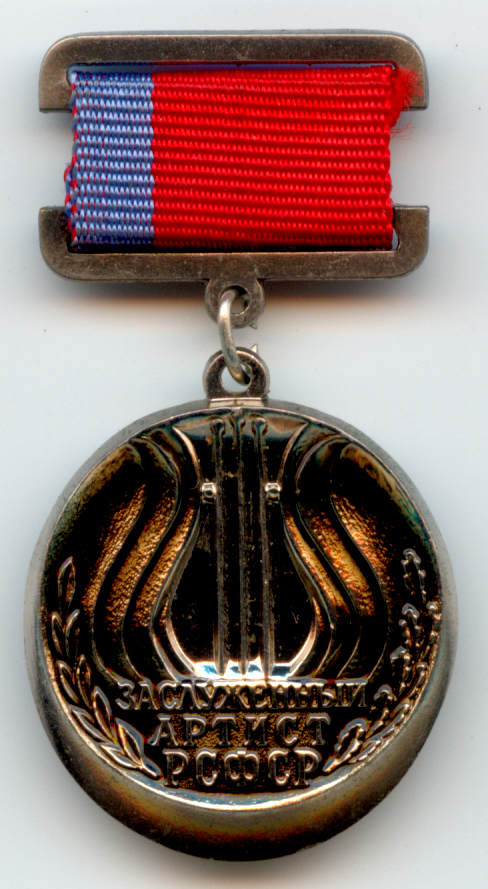
- Awards

Military service
- Years of service: 1972-present

Yelena Grigoryevna Drapeko (Note: Also transliterated as Elena Grigorievna Drapeko) (Russian: Еле́на Григо́рьевна Драпе́ко; born 29 October 1948) is a Russian theatre and film actress. She has appeared in more than 30 films and television shows since 1972. She is also a member of the State Duma since 2000.

== Career ==
On 19 December 1999 Drapeko was elected to the State Duma of the Russian Federation of the III convocation from the Communist Party of the Russian Federation in the Federal district.

On 7 December 2003, she became a deputy of the State Duma of the Russian Federation of the IV convocation on the list of the Communist Party. In 2004 she was expelled from the Communist Party, remained an independent deputy. In early 2007 she joined Gennady Semigin's People's Patriotic Union Rodina faction, and in mid-2007 she joined Alexander Babakov's A Just Russia – Rodina faction.

On 2 December 2007 she was elected to the State Duma of the Russian Federation of the V convocation from the Party A Just Russia Party.

On the 4 December 2011 she was elected to the State Duma of the Russian Federation of the VI convocation from the Party A Just Russia.

In 2016-2021 she was a deputy of the State Duma of the Russian Federation of the VII convocation from A Just Russia.

Since 19 September 2021 she is a Deputy of the State Duma of the Russian Federation of the VIII convocation. She was elected from the Party A Just Russia – Patriots – For Truth.

== Initiatives ==
In 2022, against the backdrop of Russia’s invasion of Ukraine, she proposed designating Valery Meladze as a foreign agent. In March 2022, following the withdrawal of Hollywood companies from Russia, Elena Drapeko proposed replacing Western films in Russian distribution with Chinese, Indian, Kazakh, and Uzbek films.

In March 2024, as part of a group of deputies, she submitted a bill to parliament that would restrict library access to books by foreign agents or by individuals included in the register of extremists and terrorists.

== Sanctions ==
On 29 November 2022, during the 2022 Russian invasion of Ukraine, she claimed that Ukraine as a separate country doesn't exist, that Ukraine is Russian, that the Ukrainian people would benefit from a Russian takeover, and that it was surprising that the Western countries were assisting Ukraine against the Russian attack.

In December 2022, the European Union sanctioned Drapeko in relation to the 2022 Russian invasion of Ukraine.

== Selected filmography ==
- 1972 The Dawns Here Are Quiet as Lisa Brichkina
- 1973 Eternal Call as Vera Inyutina
- 1973 Failure of Engineer Garin as duty at the hotel
- 1975 Between Day and Night as Zinaida
- 1983 Offered for Singles as Nina

== Awards and honors ==
- Order of Honour (October 11, 2018) — for a major contribution to strengthening Russian statehood, the development of parliamentarianism, and active legislative activity.
- Order of Friendship (June 12, 2013) — for a major contribution to the development of Russian parliamentarianism and active legislative activity.
- Badge of Honor “For Merits in the Development of Culture and Art” (March 27, 2017, Interparliamentary Assembly of Member Nations of the Commonwealth of Independent States) — for a significant contribution to the formation and development of a common cultural space among the member states of the Commonwealth of Independent States and for promoting cooperation in the field of culture and art.
- Medal “For Strengthening Parliamentary Cooperation” (November 29, 2018, Interparliamentary Assembly of Member Nations of the Commonwealth of Independent States) — for a special contribution to the development of parliamentarianism, strengthening democracy, and ensuring the rights and freedoms of citizens in the CIS member states.
- Medal “IPA CIS. 25 Years” (March 27, 2017, Interparliamentary Assembly of Member Nations of the Commonwealth of Independent States) — for merits in the development and strengthening of parliamentarianism, contribution to the development and improvement of the legal foundations of the Commonwealth of Independent States, and the strengthening of international and interparliamentary cooperation.
- Commendation of the Government of the Russian Federation (August 20, 2015) — for merits in legislative activity and many years of conscientious work.
