= Natalya Gundareva =

Russian actress (1948–2005)

- Наталья Гундарева
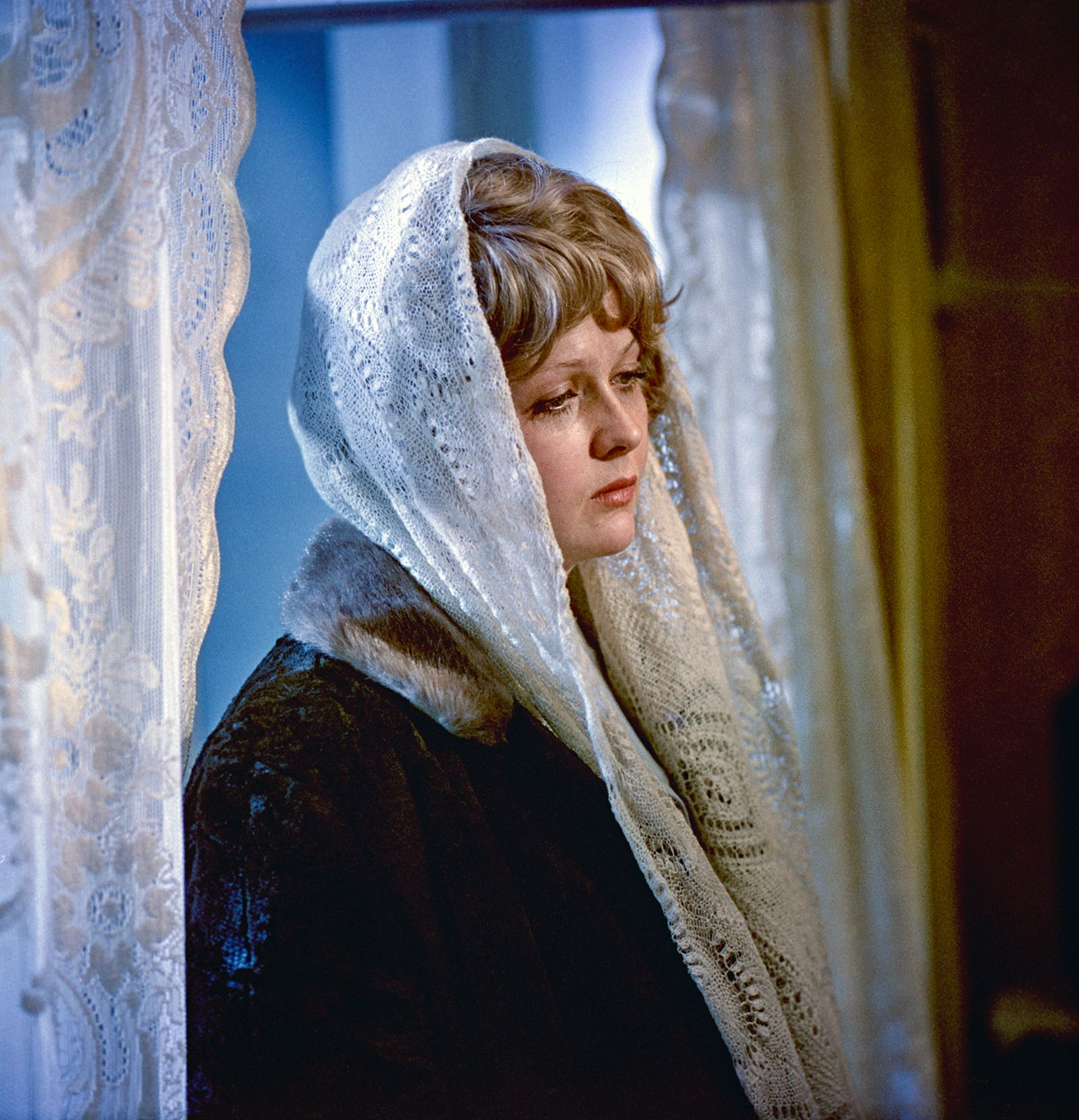
- Gundareva in 1976
- Born: Natalya Georgyevna Gundareva; August 28, 1948; Moscow, USSR
- Died: May 15, 2005 (aged 56); Moscow, Russian Federation
- Resting place: Troyekurovskoye Cemetery
- Education: Boris Shchukin Theatre Institute
- Occupation: actress
- Years active: 1966—2003
- Awards: USSR State Prize (1984); People's Artist of Russia (1986)

Natalya Georgyevna Gundareva (Russian: Наталья Георгиевна Гундарева, August 28, 1948 – May 15, 2005) was a Soviet Russian film and theatre actress, one of the leading figures at the Mayakovsky Theatre where she worked since 1971. People's Artist of Russia (1986) and the USSR State Prize (1984) laureate, as well as a four times winner of the Soviet Screen magazine's Soviet Actress of the Year poll (1977, 1981, 1985, 1990), Gundareva is best remembered for her leading parts in Sweet Woman (1976), Autumn Marathon (1979) and Once Upon a Time Twenty Years Later (1981).

== Biography ==
Natalya Gundareva was born in Moscow and spent her early years in a communal flat her family shared with several others, at the Taganka region. Her father Georgy Matveyevich was an engineer at a car factory, her mother Yelena Mikhaylovna was a senior engineer at a construction engineering research institute. Both were fond of theatre and Natalya often attended shows and rehearsals of the amateur troupe her mother was performing with. Aged fifteen, Natalya joined the Leninskiye Gory Pioneer Palace's youth theatre, and two years later decided to make acting her profession. She enrolled into the Boris Shchukin Theatre Institute and joined the Katin-Yartsev's group, where her classmates were Konstantin Raikin, Yuri Bogatyryov and Natalya Varley, among others.

=== Career ===
Upon graduation in 1971, Natalya Gundareva joined the Moscow Mayakovsky Theatre troupe. Her breakthrough here came in 1974 when, substituting for Tatyana Doronina, she played Lipochka in The Bankrupt after Alexander Ostrovsky's play, her performance lauded by both theatre critics and the Moscow theatrical community.

In 1972 Natalya Gundareva debuted on the big screen with the leading role in Vitaly Melnikov's 'rural comedy' Hello and Goodbye. Her first success came with Vladimir Fetin's melodrama Sweet Woman (1977) where she played Anya Dobrokhotova, although in retrospect two of her earlier performances, in Andrey Smirnov's Autumn (1975) and Nikolai Gubenko's Wounded Game (1976), have been highly acclaimed too. In 1977 Gundareva won the Soviet Screen magazine's Actress of the Year poll, a feat she repeated in 1981, 1985 and 1990.

The years 1979-1984 marked the peak of Natalya Gundareva's career. In 1979 she excelled on theatre stage as Katerina Izmaylova in Andrey Goncharov's production of Nikolai Leskov's Lady Macbeth of the Mtsensk District. In film, Gundareva created a number of multi-dimensional characters, notably Nina Buzykina in Georgiy Daneliya's Autumn Marathon (1979), that earned her the Vasiliev Brothers Prize. Later critics praised her performances in Vitaly Melnikov's September Vacation (after Alexander Vampilov's play Duck Hunt, 1981; at the time the film was tagged 'decadent' and premiered only in 1987) and Samson Samsonov's Offered for Singles (1984) where she played Vera Golubeva, a character the scriptwriter Arkady Inin created with her in mind. In 1986 Gundareva was honoured with the People's Artist of Russia title. That year also saw her getting seriously injured in a car crash.

In the 1990s Natalya Gundareva's appearances in films became few and far between. Her health began declining. The facial plastic surgery might have given glitzy sheen to her looks and taken her to posh magazines’ covers but damaged her stage performance, causing difficulties with mimics. In the summer of 2001 Gundareva suffered a stroke. In 2002, while walking in the garden she slipped, fell and injured her neck.

Natalya Georgyevna Gundareva died on May 15, 2005, in the Saint Alexiy hospital in Moscow, as the second stroke she suffered proved fatal. She is interred in Troyekurovskoye Cemetery.

== Filmography ==
- Passing Through Moscow (Russian: В Москве проездом, 1970) as saleswoman
- Autumn (Осень, 1974) as Dusia
- They Fought for Their Country (Они сражались за Родину, 1975) as Glikeriya (voice, uncredited)
- Sweet Woman (Сладкая женщина, 1976) as Anna Dobrokhotova
- Wounded Game (Подранки, 1977) as Tasia
- Truffaldino from Bergamo (Труффальдино из Бергамо, 1977, TV Movie) as Smeraldina
- Wrong Connection (Обратная связь, 1978) as Anna Alekseyevna Medvedeva
- Citizen Nikanorova Waits for You (Вас ожидает гражданка Никанорова, 1978) as Katya Nikanorova
- Autumn Marathon (Осенний марафон, 1979) as Nina Yevlampyevna Buzykina
- White Snow of Russia (Белый снег России, 1980) as Nadezhda
- Investigation Held by ZnaToKi. Went And Never Returned (Следствие ведут ЗнаТоКи. Ушёл и не вернулся, 1980) as Alyona Milovidova
- Say a Word for the Poor Hussar (О бедном гусаре замолвите слово, 1981, TV Movie) as Juju
- Once Upon a Time Twenty Years Later (Однажды двадцать лет спустя, 1981) as Nadya Kruglova
- Offered for Singles (Одиноким предоставляется общежитие, 1984) as Vera Nikolayevna Golubyeva
- And Life, and Tears, and Love (И жизнь, и слёзы, и любовь, 1984) as Antonina
- Winter Evening in Gagra (Зимний вечер в Гагарах, 1985) as Irina Melnikova
- Personal file of Judge Ivanova (Личное дело судьи Ивановой, 1986) as Lyubov Grigoryevna Ivanova
- The Life of Klim Samgin (Жизнь Клима Самгина, 1988, TV Series) as Marina Petrovna Zotova
- Aelita, Do Not Pester Men! (Аэлита, не приставай к мужчинам, 1988) as Aelita
- Two arrows. Stone Age Detective (Две стрелы. Детектив каменного века, 1989) as Gaunt's wife
- It (Оно, 1990) as Klementinka de Burbon
- Dogs' Feast (Собачий пир, 1990) as Zhanna
- Passport (Паспорт, 1990) as Inga
- Lost in Siberia (Затерянный в Сибири, 1991) as Faina
- Viva Gardes-Marines! (Виват, гардемарины!, 1991) as Elizabeth of Russia
- Promised Heaven (Небеса обетованные, 1991) as Lyuska
- Crazies (Чокнутые,1991) as Countess
- Un bout de Challenger (1992) as Zinaida
- Gardemarines-III (Гардемарины-III, 1992) as Elizabeth of Russia
- I Want to Go to Prison (Хочу в тюрьму, 1999) as Masha
