= Boris Shcherbakov =

Soviet and Russian actor

Boris Shcherbakov PAR
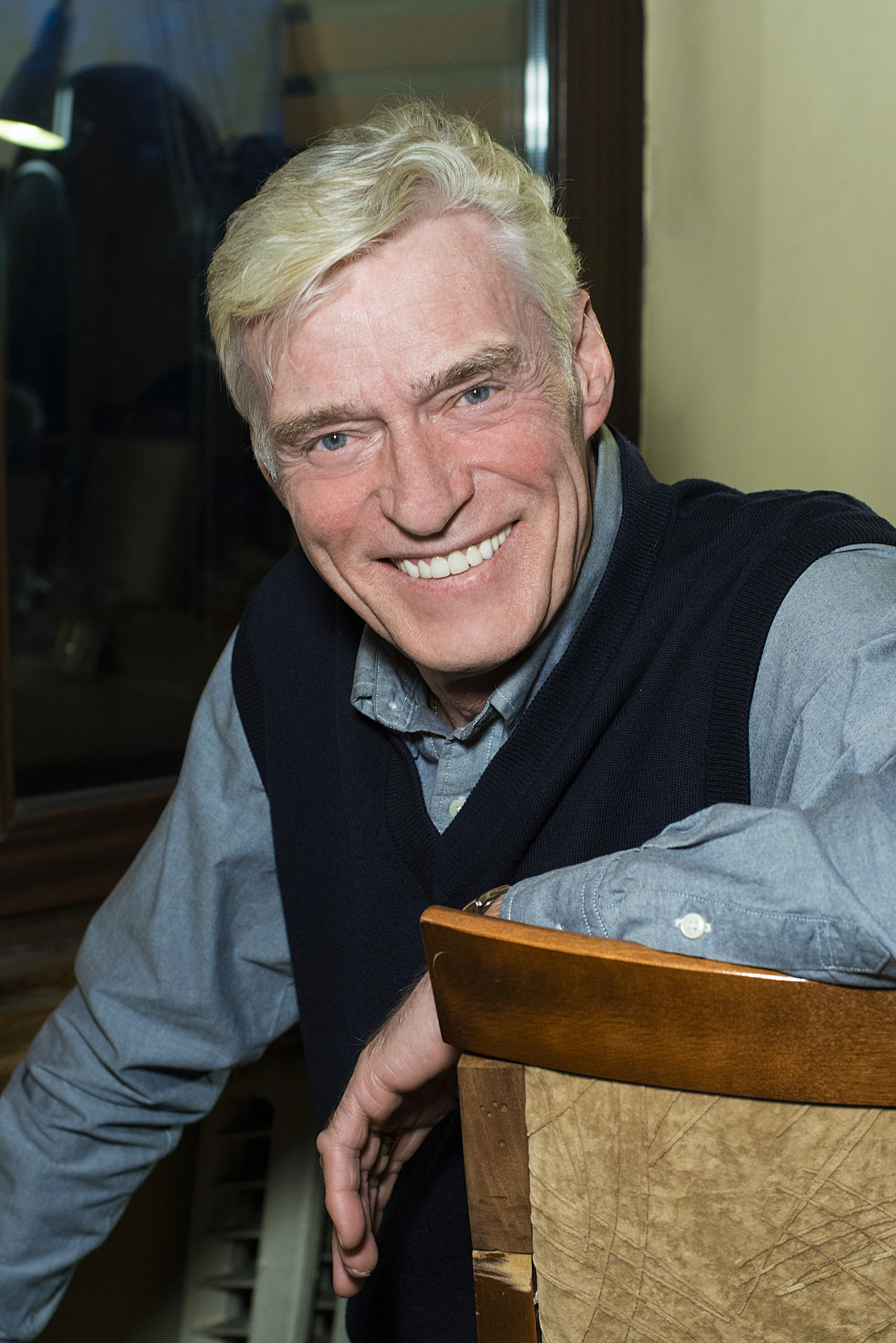
- Boris Shcherbakov in 2015
- Born: Boris Vasilevich Shcherbakov; 11 December 1949 (age 76); Leningrad, Russian SFSR, Soviet Union
- Occupations: actor, presenter
- Years active: 1963 - present
- Spouse: Tatiana Bronzova
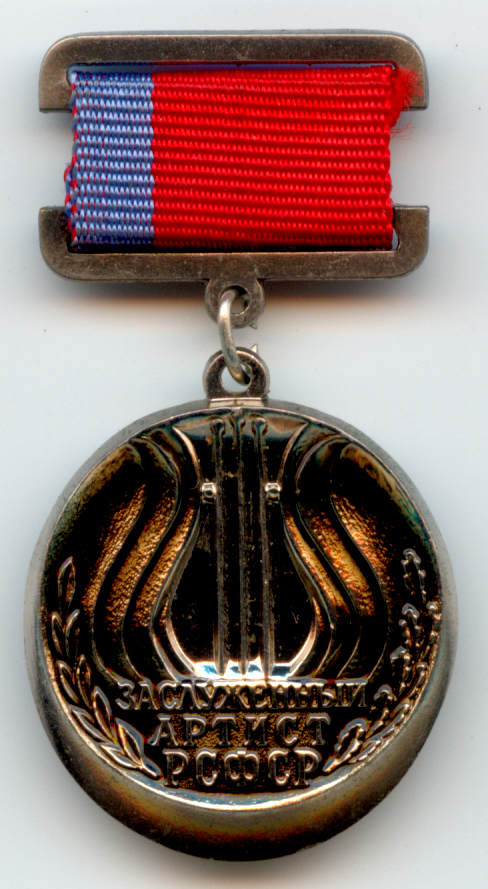
- Awards

Boris Vasilevich Shcherbakov (Russian: Бори́с Васи́льевич Щербако́в; born 11 December 1949) is a Soviet and Russian film and theater actor. People's Artist of Russian Federation (1994). Winner of USSR State Prize (1985).

== Biography ==
Boris Shcherbakov was born in Vasilyevsky Island, Leningrad, on December 11, 1949, his father was a chauffeur and mother a factory worker.

The Shcherbakov family consisted of five people, who lived in a sixteen-meter communal flat in Opochinin's street on Vasilyevsky Island. The room window looked out onto the Gulf of Finland, to which were ships, and Boris dreamed of what it would be like to become a captain and travel.

At the age of 12, Boris was selected for the role of Glebka Prokhorov in the children's adventure film Mandate.

In 1967, Boris graduated from high school and tried to enter LGITMIK, but did not pass the competition on the third round. Despite this setback, he entered the Krupskaya Institute of Culture for the directing faculty.

A year later, Boris Shcherbakov learned that in Moscow Pavel Massalsky would be recruiting a course at the Moscow Art Theatre School. He decided to quit everything and go to try his luck in Moscow. The dean of the Krupskaya Institute of Culture nevertheless insisted that Boris would stay and finish the exams. Departing to Moscow with a delay (because of the passing of exams), Boris was horrified to learn that the exams at the Moscow Art Theatre School were already finished - due to the fact that the theater was leaving for a tour to Japan, the exams were held a week earlier. Nevertheless, he managed to convince Massalsky to take him for his course.

In 1972, Boris graduated from the Moscow Art Theater School and in the same year became an actor of the Moscow Art Theater. His first work in a new capacity was the role of Sanka in the production of "Steelworkers".

In 2003, Boris Shcherbakov resigned from the Moscow Art Theater.

In 1997, he starred in the clips of singer Lyubov Uspenskaya "Carousel" and "I'm Lost".

In 1997 he hosted a documentary about the history of football "From century to century on a football" ("Age of Russian football").

From December 2007 to May 27, 2014 was one of the permanent hosts of the TV program Good Morning on Channel One Russia. Since September 2015 he has been working for the channel Zvezda.

In April 2009, Moscow hosted his personal art exhibition in the All-Russian Museum of Decorative, Applied and Folk Art. In the exhibition were presented 12 works made of wood and metal.

Boris Shcherbakov is fond of repoussé and chasing, woodcarving and in 2009 was admitted to the Moscow Union of Artists in the section of arts and crafts.

July 19, 2015 actor was hospitalized in the Nizhny Novgorod region because of heart failure. In the Ministry of Health, Interfax was informed that Shcherbakov was hospitalized on Saturday in the primary vascular department of the Arzamas hospital.

On February 1, 2023, Boris Shcherbakov was hospitalized in Botkin Hospital with a preliminary diagnosis of acute respiratory viral infection with a complication in cardiology.

=== Personal life ===
The wife of Boris Shcherbakov is Tatyana Bronzova, an actress, writer, head of the Moscow Art Theater's troupe between the years 1991-2001. They married while studying at the Moscow Art Theater School. Their son, Vasily, graduated from Moscow State University as a lawyer, in 2006 he graduated from the directing department of VGIK.

== Selected filmography ==
- 1963 Mandate as Glebka Prokhorov
- 1968 Snegurochka as boy (uncredited)
- 1974 I Serve on the Norder as the ordinary Dmitry Sedykh
- 1975 Step Forward as Vovka Monastyryov
- 1975 11 Hopes as Vladimir Babochkin
- 1980 Do Not Part with Your Beloved as Vadim
- 1981 Per Aspera Ad Astra as Navigator Kolotin
- 1981 The Old New Year as student
- 1982 Incident at Map Grid 36-80 as Maj. Gennady Volk
- 1983 Beach as Vadim Nikitin
- 1983 Examination of Immortality as Anisimov
- 1984 Volokolamsk Highway as first lieutenant Bauyrzhan Momyshuly
- 1985 Guest from the Future (Гостья из будущего) as Ivan Sergeyevich, a member of the Institute of time
- 1985 Battle of Moscow as General Romanov
- 1986 Peter the Great as Nechayev
- 1987 Lilac Ball as professor Seleznyov
- 1988 Thieves in the Law as Andrey
- 1989 The Criminal Quartet as Piotr Saraev
- 1990 Ten Years without Right of Correspondence as Mikhail
- 1990 Frenzied Bus as Boris Vasilievich
- 1991 My Best Friend, General Vasili, Son of Joseph Stalin as Seva Bagrov
- 1992 Quiet Flows the Don as Stepan
- 1996 Queen Margot as Bam
- 1996 Hello, Fools! as Fedor
- 1999 The Admirer as investigator
- 2013 Legend № 17 as Boris, Valery's father
- 2024 Fedya. Narodnyy futbolist as Nikolai Starostin
