= Oleg Tabakov =

Soviet and Russian actor (1935–2018)

- Олег Табаков
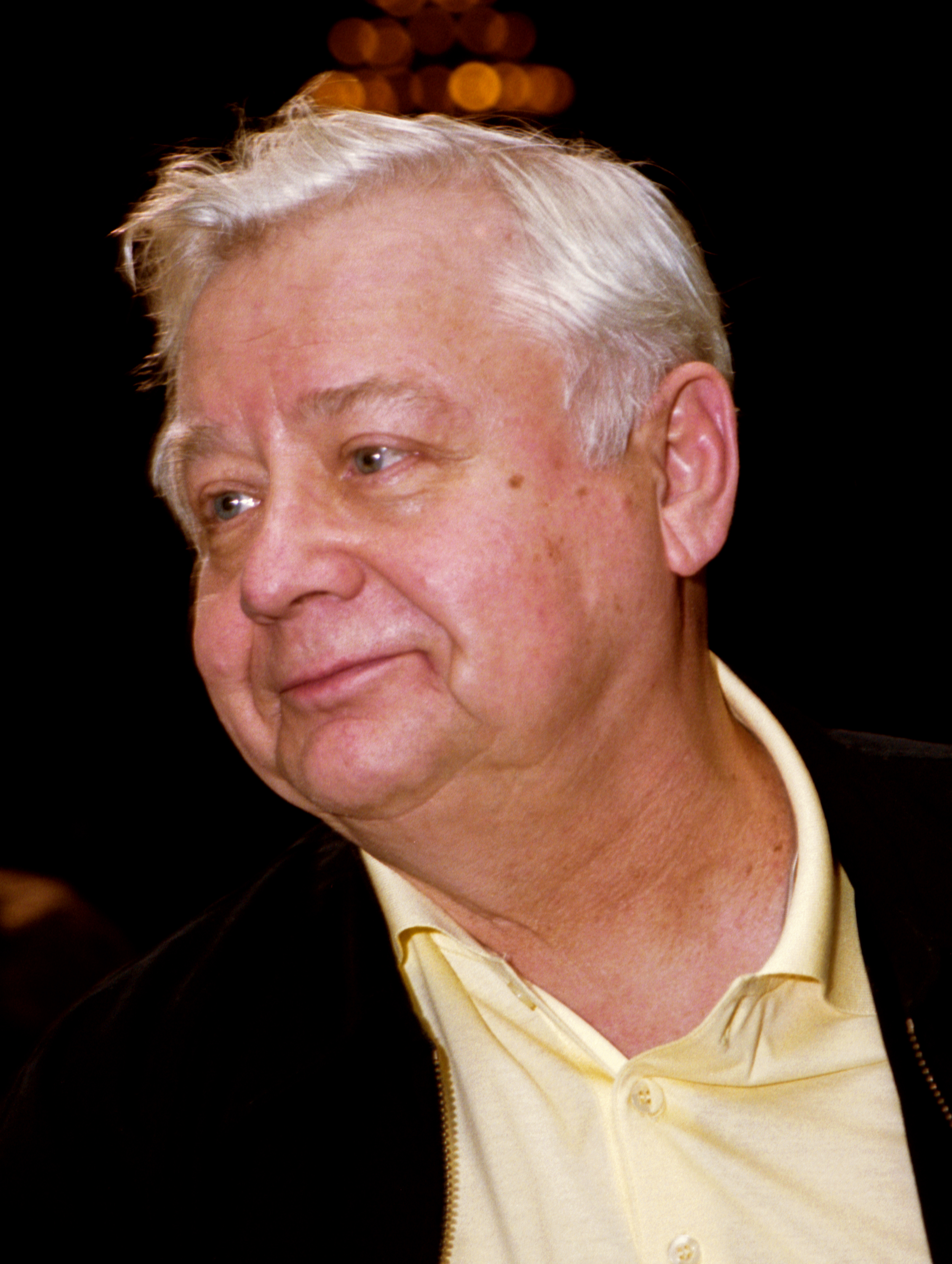
- Tabakov in 2002
- Born: Oleg Pavlovich Tabakov; 17 August 1935; Saratov, Russian SFSR, Soviet Union
- Died: 12 March 2018 (aged 82); Moscow, Russia
- Occupations: Actor, theatre director, pedagogue
- Years active: 1956–2018
- Title: People's Artist of the USSR (1988)
- Spouses: Lyudmila Krylova (m. 1960; div. 1994) Marina Zudina (m. 1994)
- Children: Anton; Aleksandra; Pavel; Maria
- Awards: Full cavalier of the Order "For Merit to the Fatherland"; Legion of Honour (Officier); Order of the Cross of Terra Mariana ( 3rd Class); Order of the Red Banner of Labour; Order of the Badge of Honour; Order of Friendship of Peoples; State Prize of the Russian Federation; USSR State Prize
- Website: tabakov.ru

Oleg Pavlovich Tabakov (Russian: Олег Павлович Табаков; 17 August 1935 – 12 March 2018) was a Soviet and Russian actor and the Artistic Director of the Moscow Chekhov Art Theatre. People's Artist of the USSR (1988).

== Biography ==
Tabakov was born in Saratov into a family of doctors. His paternal great-grandfather, Ivan Ivanovich Utin, came from serfs and was raised in a wealthy peasant family under the Tabakov surname. His grandfather, Kondratiy Tabakov, worked as a locksmith in Saratov where he built himself a house and married a local commoner Anna Konstantinovna Matveeva. Oleg's father, Pavel Kondratievich Tabakov, worked at the State Regional Research Institute of Epidemiology and Microbiology "Microbe" in Saratov.

His maternal grandfather, Andrei Frantzevich Piontkovsky, was a Polish nobleman who owned lands in the Podolia Governorate and married a local villager, Olga Terentievna (surname unknown) of Ukrainian origin. Oleg's mother, Maria Andreevna Berezovskaya (née Piontkovskaya), was a radiologist. She had a daughter Mirra from the previous marriage to Gugo Goldstern, a high-ranking Soviet functionary and intelligence officer killed in the line of duty.

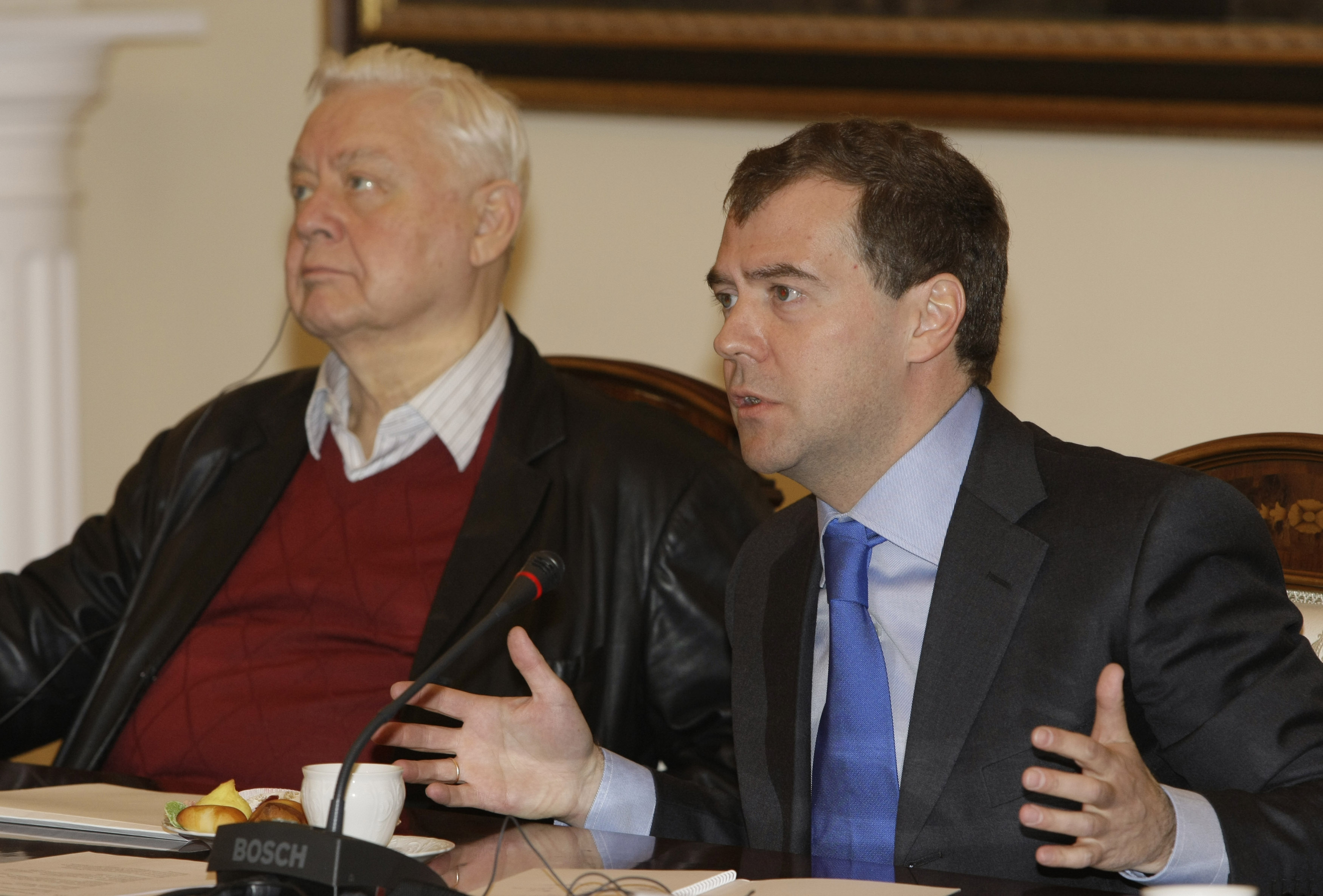
With Dmitry Medvedev, 29 January 2010

During the Great Patriotic War, Oleg's father volunteered for the frontline and served aboard a hospital train while his mother was evacuated to Ural along with children where she also worked in a military hospital. After the war, the parents separated.

== Theatre career ==
Tabakov studied at the Moscow Art Theatre School. Upon graduating, he became one of the founding fathers of the Sovremennik Theatre. He administrated the Sovremennik until 1982, when he moved to the Moscow Art Theatre, where he has played Molière and Salieri for over 20 years. In 1986, Tabakov persuaded his students to form the Tabakov Studio attached to the Moscow Art Theatre. Among those who studied at the studio were Russian actors Yevgeny Mironov, Sergey Bezrukov, Vladimir Mashkov, Andrey Smolyakov and Alexandre Marine, and American actor Jon Bernthal.

== Film career ==
Tabakov's movie career paralleled the theatrical. He was featured in Grigori Chukhrai's Clear Skies (1961), Sergei Bondarchuk's War and Peace (1966–67), TV series Seventeen Moments of Spring (1973) and D'Artagnan and Three Musketeers (1978), the Academy Award-winning Moscow Does Not Believe In Tears (1980), Nikita Mikhalkov's Oblomov (1981) and Dark Eyes (1986), and the mock red western A Man from the Boulevard des Capuchines (1987).

== Voice-over work ==
Tabakov has lent his distinctive, purr-like voice to a number of animated characters, including the talking cat Matroskin in Three from Prostokvashino and its sequels. After the Matroskin role, he dubbed the character of Garfield into Russian in the feature film Garfield and its sequel.

== Political activity ==
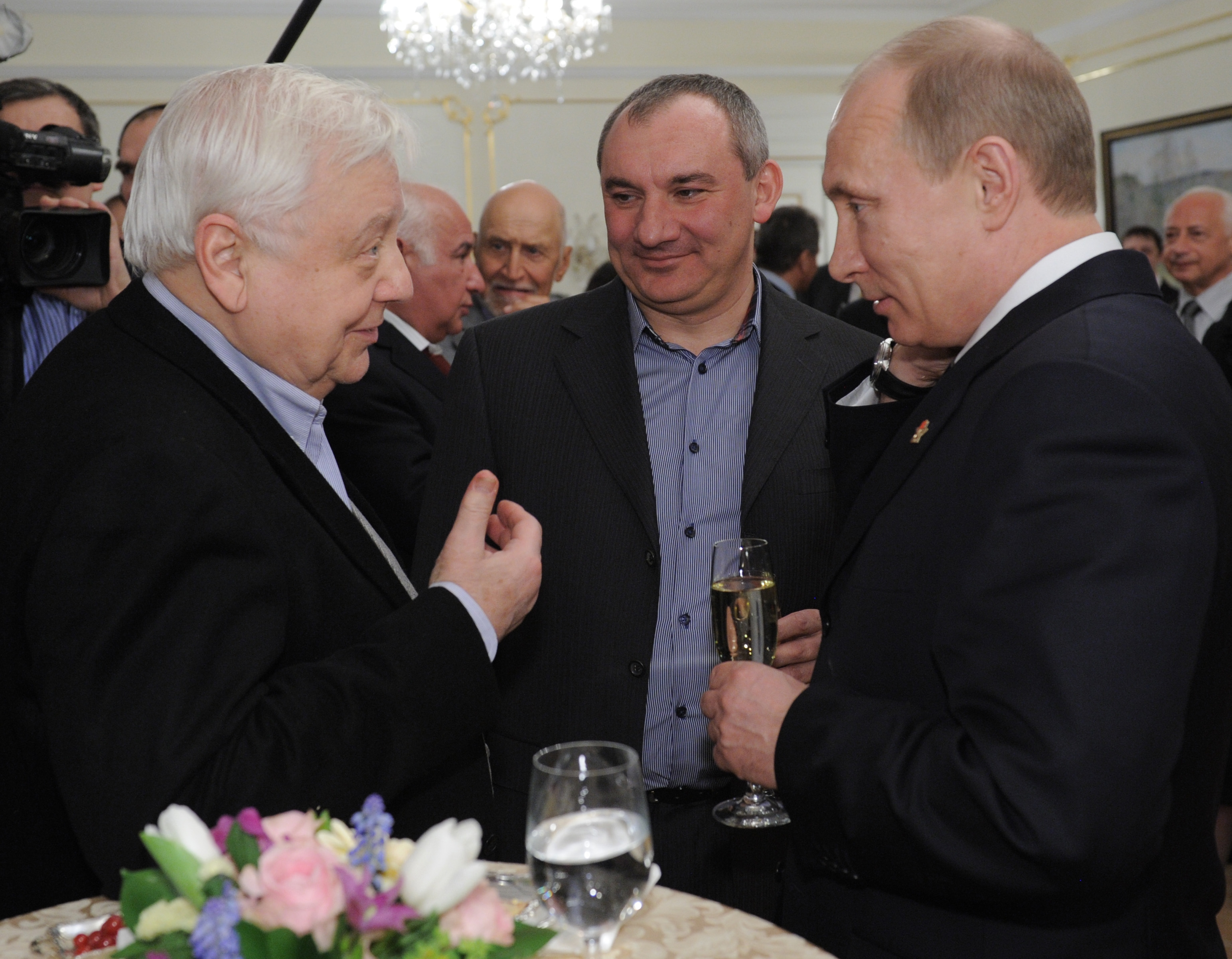
Oleg Tabakov, Nikolai Fomenko, and Vladimir Putin, 2012

In 1992–2008, Tabakov was a member of the commission on state awards under the President of the Russian Federation.

Tabakov was a supporter of the United Russia party.

In 2001, Tabakov was appointed a member of the board of the Ministry of Culture of the Russian Federation.

During the 2012 Russian presidential election, Tabakov was registered as a "Trusted Representative" (Доверенное Лицо) of Vladimir Putin. In July 2012, by Putin’s Decree, Tabakov was included in the Council for Public Television.

In March 2014, Tabakov signed a letter to President Putin in support of the annexation of Crimea. In September 2014, Tabakov claimed that Crimea has no relation to Ukraine and upbraided Ukrainians for discussing it: "But all happened fairly. If our Ukrainian brothers were smarter, they would not discuss that topic. They had to say: "Forgive us for God's sake! We had encroached the gravy train." Because Crimea has no relation to dependent, nor independent Ukraine." In December 2015, Tabakov was banned from entering Ukraine.

In July 2015, Tabakov made comments to the Ren-TV channel regarding the list of 117 Russian artists who may pose a threat to the national security of Ukraine, prepared by the Ministry of Culture of Ukraine. He made a number of statements about Ukrainians advocating for a blacklist, saying that they

are not very enlightened. It's like my grandmother sometimes said: "Don't bother with them, these are dark and illiterate people." The trouble is that normal people will suffer from the fact that normal information does not reach them... I feel sorry for them. They are in some sense wretched.

In the same comments, Tabakov stated that "at all times, their best times, their brightest representatives of the intelligentsia were somewhere in second and third positions after the Russians." He was accused of xenophobia and chauvinism.

== Honours and awards ==
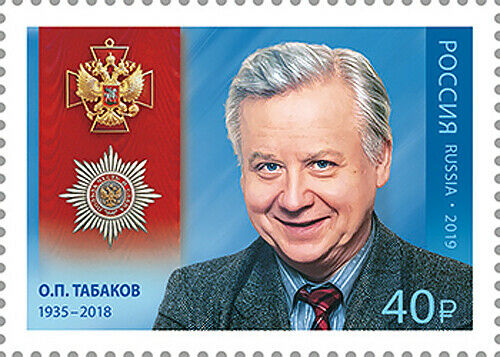
A 2019 stamp of Russia featuring Tabakov and his Order of Merit for the Fatherland

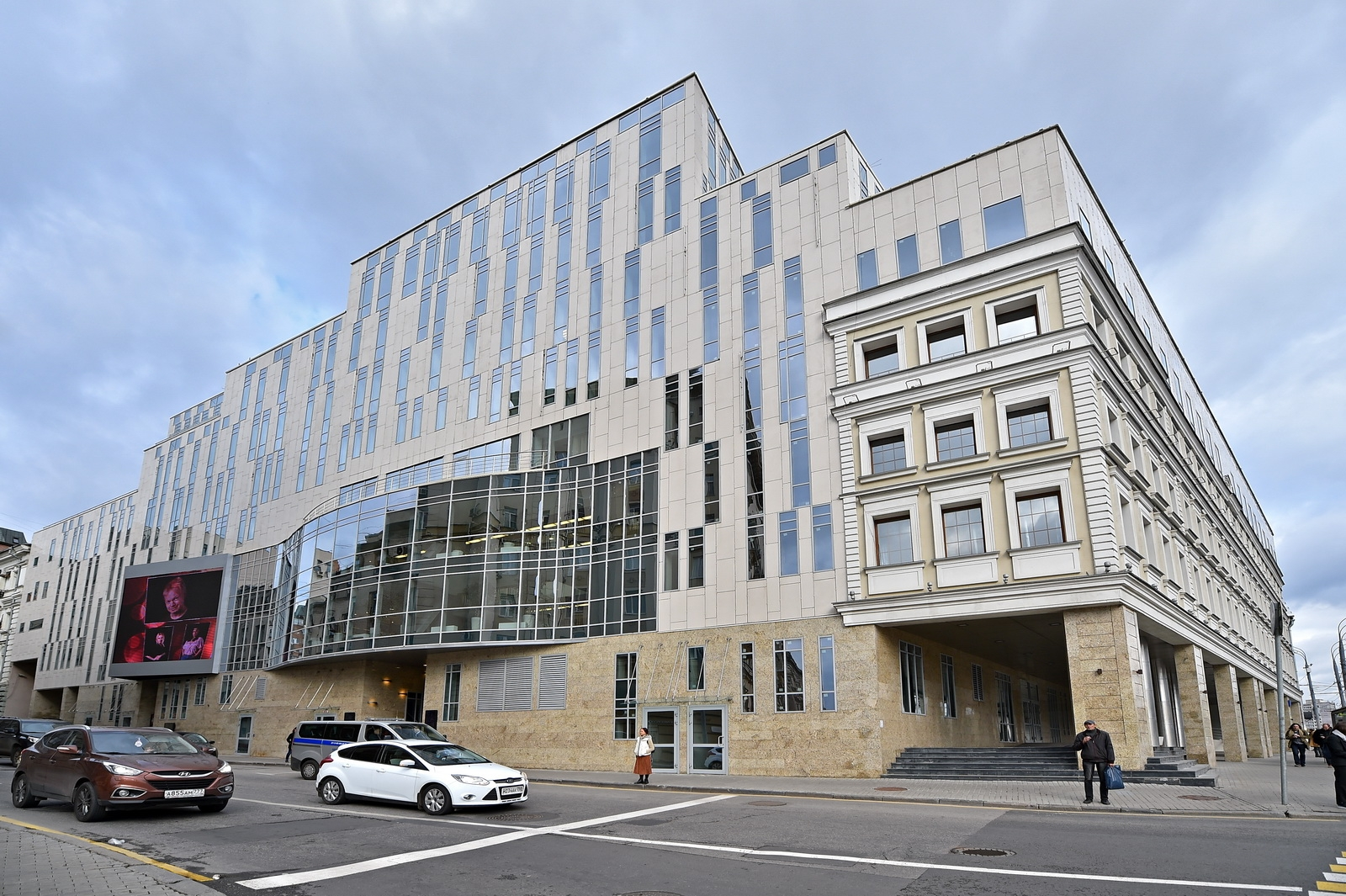
Theater of Oleg Tabakov in Malaya Sukharevskaya Square in Moscow.

- Order "For Merit to the Fatherland";
  - 1st class (17 August 2010) – for outstanding contributions to the development of domestic theatrical art and many years of creative activity
  - 2nd class (17 August 2005) – for outstanding contribution to the development of theatrical art, and many years of creative activity
  - 3rd class (23 October 1998) – for many years of fruitful work in the field of theatrical art, and in connection with the 100th anniversary of the Moscow Art Theatre
  - 4th class (29 June 2015)
- Order of Friendship of Peoples (10 November 1993) – for his great personal contribution to the development of theatrical art, and training qualified personnel for theatre and film
- Order of the Red Banner of Labour (USSR, 1982)
- Order of the Badge of Honour (USSR, 1967)
- USSR State Prize (1967)
- State Prize of the Russian Federation (1997)
- Honored Artist of the RSFSR (1969)
- People's Artist of the RSFSR (1977)
- People's Artist of the USSR (1988)
- Honorary Member of the Russian Academy of Arts (8 October 2008)
- Golden Mask Award (1995)
- Seagull Theatre Prize
- Crystal Turandot Award
- Russian Presidential Prize for Literature and the Arts (2003)
- Moscow Komsomol Prize (1967)
- Moscow Mayor's Award for Literature and the Arts (1997)
- Diploma of the Moscow City Duma (2008)
- Medal "For Valiant Labour" (Tatarstan, 2010)
- Honorary Citizen of the Republic of Mordovia (2010), Saratov Oblast (2010), City of Saratov (2003)
- Order "Key of Friendship" (Kemerovo Oblast, 2010)
- Medal "For Faith and Good" (Kemerovo Oblast, 2011)
- Order of the Cross of Terra Mariana, 3rd class (Estonia, 2005)
- Officer of the Legion of Honor (France, 2013)

== Selected filmography ==
- Sasha Enters Life (1957) as Sasha Komelev
- The Variegateds Case (1958) as Igor Peresvetov
- People on the Bridge (1960) as Viktor Bulygin
- Probation (1960) as Sasha Yegorov
- A Noisy Day (1960) as Oleg Savin
- Clear Skies (1961) as Seryozhka
- The Alive and the Dead (1964) as Krutikov
- War and Peace (1965–1967, part 1-4) as Nikolai Rostov
- The Bridge Is Built (1966) as Sergei Zaytsev
- A Pistol Shot (1967) as Belkin
- Touches to the Рortrait of V. I. Lenin (1967) as Nikolai Bukharin
- Shine, Shine, My Star (Gori, gori, moya zvezda) (1970) as Vladimir Iskremas
- The Secret of the Iron Door (1970) as Father
- King Stag (1970) as Cigolotti
- The Polynin Case (1970) as Viktor Balakirev
- Property of the Republic (1972) as Makar Ovchinnikov
- Seventeen Instants of Spring (1973, TV Series) as Walter Schellenberg
- Mark Twain Says No (1975, TV Movie) as Mark Twain
- How Czar Peter the Great Married Off His Moor (1976) as Yeguzhinskiy
- Practical Joke (1977) as otets Komarovskogo
- An Unfinished Piece for Mechanical Piano (1977) as Pavel Petrovich Shcherbuk
- Lone Wolf (1978) as Bersenev
- Three from Prostokvashino (1978, Short) as Matroskin the Cat (voice)
- D'Artagnan and Three Musketeers (1979, TV Mini-Series) as King Louis XIII
- Moscow Does Not Believe In Tears (1980) as Vladimir, Katerina's lover
- A Few Days from the Life of I. I. Oblomov (1980) as Ilya Ilyich Oblomov
- The Vacancy (1981) as Yusov
- Everything's the Wrong Way (1982) as Yermakov, papa
- Flights in Dreams and Reality (1983) as Nikolay Pavlovich
- Mary Poppins, Goodbye (1984, TV Movie) as Miss Andrew
- Time and the Conways (1984) as Robin (Adult)
- Kukacka v temném lese (1985) as Otto Kukuck
- Applause, Applause... (1985) as Sergey Shevtsov
- After the Rain, on Thursday (1985) as Koschei the Immortal
- Dark Eyes (1987) as Sua Grazia
- A Man from the Boulevard des Capuchines (1987) as Harry
- Shag (1989) as Tutunov
- Love with Privileges (1989) as Nikolay Petrovich, KGB General
- It (1989) as Brudasty
- Royal Hunt (1990) as Alexander Mikhailovich Golitsyn
- The Inner Circle (1991) as Vlasik
- Stalin (1992) as doctor Vinogradov
- Moscow Vacation (1995) as Maurizio
- Shirli-Myrli (1995) as Sukhodrishchev
- Three Stories (1997) as Old Man
- Sympathy Seeker (1997) as Cook
- Quadrille (1999) as Sanya Arefyev
- The President and His Granddaughter (2000) as President
- Give Me Moonlight (2001) as cameo
- Taking Sides (2001) as Colonel Dymshitz
- The State Counsellor (2005) as Prince Dolgoroukoy
- Yesenin (2005, TV Mini-Series) as KGB General Simagin
- Relatives (2006) as Polgármester
- Yolki 2 (2011) as cameo
- The Kitchen in Paris (2014) as Pyotr Barinov
- Kitchen. The Last Battle (2017) as Pyotr Barinov
