= Leonid Yarmolnik =

Soviet and Russian actor and film producer

- Леонид Ярмольник
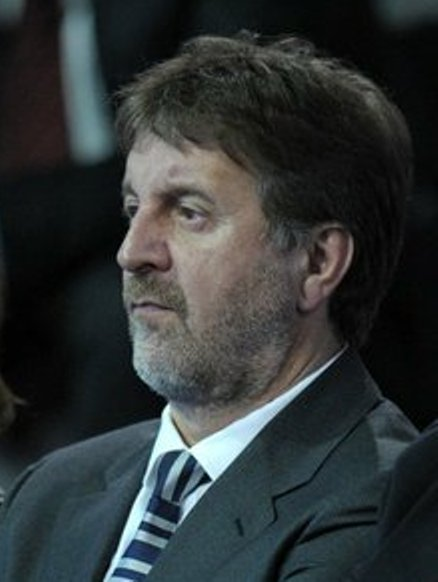
- Yarmolnik in 2014
- Born: Leonid Isaakovich Yarmolnik; 22 January 1954 (age 72); Grodekovo, Primorsky Krai, RSFSR, USSR
- Occupations: Actor; film producer; presenter; radio broadcasting; humorist; politician
- Years active: 1974–present

Leonid Isaakovich Yarmolnik (Russian: Леонид Исаакович Ярмольник; born 22 January 1954) is a Soviet and Russian actor and film producer.

== Biography ==
Yarmolnik was born on 22 January 1954 in Grodekovo, Primorsky Krai, where his father, Isaac Yarmolnik, a Soviet Army officer, was stationed. His mother, Faina Ivanovna Yarmolnik (1935), worked as a laboratory assistant in a polyclinic. In 1960, Yarmolnik's family relocated to Lviv. Leonid studied at the local music school and was involved in plays at the Lviv Folk Theater. In 1972, he became a student at the Boris Shchukin Theatre Institute and graduated from the acting class of Yury Katin-Yartsev, a famous Russian actor and acclaimed pedagogue of the Vakhtangov Theater Arts School, in 1976. From 1976 to 1984, he was an actor at the Taganka Theatre. Yarmolnik started his own studio, L-Club, specializing in film distribution, and anchored a TV program with the same name. Until 2012, he was a member of the jury on the popular KVN game show. He was honored with the State Prize of the Russian Federation in 2001 for the role of Zhora in The Barracks. From 2 March to 8 June 2014, he was a member of the jury of the music show ‘Toch-v-Toch’.

== Personal life ==
Leonid Yarmolnik is married to Oksana Afanasieva and they have one daughter together. Oksana Afanasieva is a former girlfriend of Soviet singer songwriter Vladimir Vysotsky.

Yarmolnik is Jewish.

== Selected filmography ==
=== As an actor ===
- 1979 — The Very Same Munchhausen (Тот самый Мюнхгаузен) as Theophil von Münchhausen
- 1983 — Look for a Woman (Ищите женщину) as policeman Maximan
- 1984 — Copper Angel (Медный ангел) as Maurice Barro
- 1984 — TASS Is Authorized to Declare... (ТАСС уполномочен заявить...) as Grechaev
- 1987 — A Man from the Boulevard des Capucines (Человек с бульвара Капуцинов) as one-eyed cowboy Martin
- 1988 — Yolki-palki (Ёлки-палки!) as Grigory Kaigorodov
- 1989 — Private Detective, or Operation Cooperation (Частный детектив, или Операция «Кооперация») as Airliner hijacker
- 1989 — Two Arrows. Stone Age Detective (Две стрелы. Детектив каменного века) as Long-nosed
- 1990 — Passport (Паспорт) as Borya's Israeli friend
- 1991 — Odyssey of Captain Blood (Одиссея капитана Блада) as Levasseur
- 1995 — Moscow Vacation as Grisha
- 1995 — Heads and Tails as Gosha
- 1998 — Crossroads as Oleg 'Alik' Sevastyanov
- 2004 — My Step Brother Frankenstein as Yulik
- 2005 — The Case of "Dead Souls" as Plyushkin (TV)
- 2006 — Moscow Mission (Обратный отсчёт) as Krot
- 2010 — Love in the Big City 2 (Любовь в большом городе 2) as father of Igor
- 2011 — Cars 2 as Miles Axlerod (Russian version)
- 2013 — Hard to Be a God (Трудно быть богом) as Don Rumata
- 2016 — Guardians of the Night (Ночные стражи) as major Gamayun, head of the secret police Department
- 2023 — The Master and Margarita as Dr. Stravinsky

=== As a film producer ===
- Ku! Kin-dza-dza (2013)

=== Game Show ===
- Fort Boyard Russian Game Show Russian Edition 2003
