= List of Russian films of 1992 =

A list of films produced in Russia in 1992 (see 1992 in film).

== 1992 ==
Title	Russian title	Director	Cast	Genre	Notes
An Independent Life	Самостоятельная жизнь	Vitali Kanevsky	Pavel Nazarov	Drama	
Black Square	Чёрный квадрат	Yuri Moroz	Dmitry Kharatyan	Crime drama	
Dreams of Russia	Сны о России	Junya Sato	Ken Ogata	Drama	
Dyuba-Dyuba	Дюба-Дюба	Aleksandr Khvan	Oleg Menshikov, Anzhela Belyanskaya	Drama	
Encore, Once More Encore!	Анкор, ещё анкор!	Pyotr Todorovsky	Valentin Gaft, Irina Rozanova	Drama	
Gardes-Marines III	Гардемарины III	Svetlana Druzhinina	Dmitry Kharatyan, Mikhail Mamaev	Adventure	
Good Luck, Gentlemen	Удачи вам, господа!	Vladimir Bortko	Nikolai Karachentsov	Comedy	
I Hope for You	На тебя уповаю	Elena Tsyplakova	Irina Rozanova, Natalya Sokoreva	Drama	
Luna Park	Луна-парк	Pavel Lungin	Oleg Borisov, Andrei Gutin	Drama	
Over the Dark Water	Над тёмной водой	Dmitry Meskhiev	Aleksandr Abdulov, Kseniya Kachalina	Drama	
Presence	Присутствие	Andrey Dobrovolskiy	Aleksei Petrenko	Drama	
The Big Exchange	Менялы	Georgiy Shengeliya	Vladimir Ilyin, Andrey Ponomaryov	Comedy	
The Chekist	Чекист	Aleksandr Rogozhkin	Igor Sergeyev	Drama	
The General	Генерал	Igor Nikolayev	Vladimir Gostyukhin, Irina Akulova	War	
The Murder at Zhdanovskaya	Убийство на «Ждановской»	Sulambek Mamilov	Ivan Bortnik	Crime drama	
Tractor Drivers 2	Трактористы 2	Gleb Aleynikov, Igor Aleynikov	Yevgueni Kondratyev	Comedy	
Weather Is Good on Deribasovskaya, It Rains Again on Brighton Beach	На Дерибасовской хорошая погода, или На Брайтон-Бич опять идут дожди	Leonid Gaidai	Dmitry Kharatyan, Kelly McGrill	Comedy	

== See also ==
- 1992 in Russia
