= Viva Gardes-Marines! =

1991 film by Svetlana Druzhinina

- Directed by: Svetlana Druzhinina
- Written by: Svetlana Druzhinina
- Starring: Dmitry Kharatyan; Sergey Zhigunov; Mikhail Boyarsky; Lyudmila Gurchenko; Kristina Orbakaitė
- Cinematography: Anatoly Mukasei
- Music by: Victor Lebedev
- Production company: Mosfilm
- Release date: 1991
- Running time: 140 min.
- Country: USSR
- Language: Russian

Viva Gardes-Marines! or (Russian: Виват, гардемарины!, romanized: Vivat, gardemariny!) is a 1991 Soviet two-series television film (mini-series), the second of a series of films about Russian Gardes-Marines of the 18th century, directed by Svetlana Druzhinina. It was the sequel to Gardes-Marines, Forward! and was followed by Gardes-Marines-III. Both these films were also directed by Druzhinina.

== Plot ==
Russian Empire, 1744. Empress Elizabeth is childless and increasingly ill. Her nephew, Tsarevich Petr Fedorovich, the son of Anna, Elizabeth's elder sister, is appointed as heir. This is a quarrelsome, foolish young man who from an early age became familiar with alcohol and tobacco. In order to strengthen the dynasty, Elizabeth decides to arrange the marriage of her good-for-nothing nephew, offering him one of the German princesses as a bride, Sophie Friederike Auguste, who by virtue of her young age is affectionately called "Fiquet".

Vice-chancellor Bestuzhev summons Aleksei Korsak and Alexander Belov and gives them an important assignment. Friends should hand over a personal letter to Prince Anhalt-Zerbst, and then deliver "Fiquet" and her mother incognito to St. Petersburg. On the way to their homeland, their third friend, Nikita Olenev, unexpectedly joins them, who at that time was studying in Germany. True friends Gardes-Marines are together again, and they are bringing a precious cargo with them to the distant snow-covered Russia: the future wife of the heir to the throne and her mother.

But such political action can not go unnoticed in Europe. French diplomacy starts another intrigue, and Chevalier de Brillieu again is its tool. Using his skill of a clever Don Juan, de Brillieu should become the lover and confidant of Fiquet's mother - the Duchess Johanna, a lustful and extravagant woman, up to her neck in debt. Then acting through the duchess, France will be able to influence the heir and his wife in its own interests. De Brillieu takes up the work with ardor because personal animosity is involved. After all it was the Gardes-Marines who stole Anastasia Yaguzhinskaya away from him, a Russian beauty whom the Frenchman still loves. And now de Brillieu prepares a trap, which must include friends and Gardes-Marines, and "Fiquet" with her mother...

== Production ==
The filming process started in 1986, but after about a month and a half stopped due to the director's leg trauma she got when riding a horse. For both Sergey Zhigunov (Aleksandr Belov) and Tatyana Lyutaeva (Anastasia Yaguzhinskaya), it is the first major film.

== Cast ==
- Dmitry Kharatyan – Aleksei Korsak, Gardes-Marine
- Sergey Zhigunov – Aleksandr Belov, Gardes-Marine (voice by Aleksandr Domogarov)
- Mikhail Mamaev – Nikita Olenev, Gardes-Marine (voice by Andrey Gradov)
- Mikhail Boyarsky – Chevalier de Brillieu
- Tatyana Lyutaeva – Anastasia Yaguzhinskaya (voice by Anna Kamenkova)
- Kristina Orbakaitė – Princess Sophie Friederike Auguste von Anhalt-Zerbst-Dornburg, "Fiquet", future Empress Catherine the Great
- Vladimir Soshalsky – Christian August, Prince of Anhalt-Zerbst, Fiquet's father
- Lyudmila Gurchenko – Joanna Elisabeth of Holstein-Gottorp, Fiquet's mother
- Natalya Gundareva – Elizabeth of Russia
- Yevgeniy Yevstigneyev – Alexey Bestuzhev-Ryumin, Vice-Chancellor
- Mikhail Yefremov – crown prince Pyotr Fyodorovich
- Sergei Nikonenko – Count Peter Chernyshev, Russian Ambassador to Prussia
- Lidiya Fedoseyeva-Shukshina – Сourtier Ekaterina Chernysheva, Russian Ambassador's wife
- Paul Butkevich – Frederick the Great (voice by Innokenty Smoktunovsky)
- Leonid Satanovskiy – Ober-Hofmarshal Brummer
- Olga Mashnaya – Sophia Korsak, Aleksei's wife
- Sergey Migitsko – Jacques-Joachim Trotti, marquis de La Chétardie
- Vladimir Balon – Jacques, de Brillieu's servant
- Viktor Bortsov – Gavrila, Olenev's servant
- Aleksey Vanin – Ivan, guard

== Soundtrack ==
- "Do not hang your nose!" (Не вешать нос!) – Dmitry Kharatyan and Aleksandr Domogarov
- "Dove (Lanfren-lanfra)" (Голубка (Ланфрен-ланфра) – Mikhail Boyarsky
- "Song of the Cricket" (Песенка о сверчке) – Kristina Orbakaitė

== Filming ==
- Filming took place in the winter of 1989–1990 in the museum-estate "Kuskovo".
