= Practical joke (disambiguation) =

Practical joke is a mischievous trick played on someone.

Practical Joke may also refer to:

- Practical Joke (1977 film), a romantic drama
- Practical Joke (2008 film), a Russian romantic drama
- Practical Joke (horse), an American Thoroughbred racehorse
- Practical Jokers, a 1938 Our Gang short comedy film

== See also ==
- Practical joker (disambiguation)
