= Olga Antonova =

Olga Antonova may refer to:

- Olga Antonova (athlete) (born 1960), Russian sprinter
- Olga Antonova (actress) (born 1937), Russian actress
