= Thirteen Chairs =

Thirteen Chairs may refer to:

- Thirteen Chairs (1938 film), German film
- Thirteen Chairs (1945 film), Swedish film starring Åke Söderblom
- The Thirteen Chairs, 1969 American film
- Pub "13 Chairs", Soviet TV show, 1966–1980

== See also ==
- 12 Chairs
- Based on Thirteen Chairs (1938):
  - Mein Opa und die 13 Stühle
  - Rabe, Pilz und dreizehn Stühle
