= Diktor =

Diktor may refer to:

- Diktor, a character in the 1941 Robert Heinlein short story "By His Bootstraps"
- Diktor TV, a character in the 1955 Soviet comedy film Behind Show Windows

== See also ==
- Dikta, a fictional race of humans in Larry Niven's novel A World Out of Time
