= Nikolai Parfionov =

Soviet and Russian theater and film actor

Nikolay Parfyonov
- Born: 25 July 1912; Sergiyevy-Gorki, Vladimir Governorate, Russian Empire
- Died: 7 January 1999 (aged 86); Moscow, Russia
- Occupation: Actor
- Years active: 1944–1992

Nikolay Ivanovich Parfyonov (Russian: Николай Иванович Парфёнов; 25 July 1912 – 7 January 1999) was a Soviet and Russian theater and film actor. Honored Art Worker of the RSFSR (1968).

Known for having played more than 100 roles, mostly in episodes. Journalists described him as the "King of Episode"

== Filmography ==
- Son of the Regiment (1946) as Kuzma Gorbunov
- True Friends (1954) as a spectator in the club
- Adventures of Krosh (1961) as Vladimir Georgiyevich
- The First Trolleybus (1963) as chauffeur
- Give Me a Book of Complaints (1964) as Ivan Postnikov
- The chairman (1964) as Klyagin
- Come Here, Mukhtar! (1964) as Gubarev
- Children of Don Quixote (1965) as Afanasy Petrovich
- Thirty Three (1965) as Prokhorov
- Seven Old Men and a Girl (1968) as Sukhov
- Afonya (1975) as Boris Petrovich
- Tears Were Falling (1982) as Kuzyakin
- Sincerely Yours... (1985) as Novikov
- Do Not Marry, Girls (1985) as Trofimov
- Where is the Nophelet? (1987) as Fyodor Golikov
- Private Detective, or Operation Cooperation (1989) as Mogilny
- Weather Is Good on Deribasovskaya, It Rains Again on Brighton Beach (1992) as colonel Petrenko
