= Mikhail Kokshenov =

Soviet and Russian actor, film director (1936–2020)

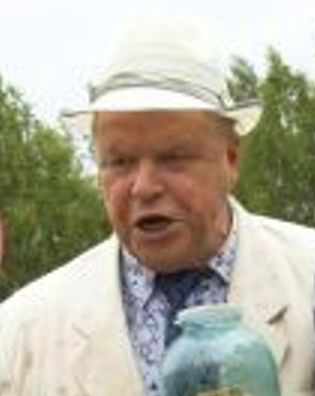
- Born: Mikhail Mikhailovich Kokshenov; 16 September 1936; Moscow, Russian SFSR, Soviet Union
- Died: 4 June 2020 (aged 83); Krasnogorsky District, Moscow Oblast
- Occupations: Actor, film director, screenwriter, film producer
- Years active: 1957–2010
- Title: Honored Artist of the RSFSR (1983); People's Artist of Russia (2002)
- Spouses: Nina Vokrosh (m. 1986; div. 1987) Elena Kokshenova (m. 1987; div. 2007) Natalya Lepyokhina (m. 2007)
- Children: Alevtina

Mikhail Mikhailovich Kokshenov (16 September 1936, Moscow – 4 June 2020, Krasnogorsky District, Moscow Oblast) was a Soviet and Russian actor, film director and screenwriter. People's Artist of Russia (2002).

== Biography ==
Mikhail Kokshenov was born on 16 September 1936 in Moscow. He spent his childhood in the Zamoskvorechye District. The actor's parents in the 1930s lived in the Far East of the USSR: in the village of Monomakhovo, the Far Eastern Krai, now the Dalnegorsky District of the Primorsky Krai.

In 1957 he graduated from the Moscow Industrial College, after which he worked as an engineer for the management of Glavnefterudprom. In 1963 he graduated from the Boris Shchukin Theatre Institute. He worked as an actor at the Mayakovsky Theatre. In 1966 he moved to the Moscow Theater of Miniatures and began to act in films in parallel. In 1974 he moved to the Theater-Studio of the Film Actor.

Author of the book of memoirs "Oranges, Vitamins ..." (2000).

=== Career ===
Kokshenov starred in more than 100 films, where, as a rule, he performed in the comic role of stupid hulks and village simpletons.

Since the early 1990s, he has directed more than a dozen films ("commercial" comedies based on modern material), the so-called cooperative cinema, in which he also played himself. His most famous films are Russian Business and Russian Miracle. In these films, he tried to change his role and played the role of the all-knowing and hardened "new Russian". The original creative move of Kokshenov as a director is known – showing a close-up of the process of chewing food. As noted by Arkady Inin

what would not have been enough budget to make a movie, he managed to do it, as they say, "out of love". That is, if it was necessary to fence off the site in the center of the city, which was impossible for any money, Misha walked with his disarming smile to the policemen, and they lined up in front of him, as if in front of a general, on line. They fenced off any areas, blocked traffic, he could stop planes at the airport, he could detain a train.

In the early 2000s, he starred in commercials for a Moscow firm for the repair of household appliances in the guise of a "master on call". In total, three videos were shot with the participation of Kokshenov: in the first he combined a TV set with a household microwave oven, in the second he repaired a refrigerator and a washing machine for a woman, but refused to repair a sewing machine, and in the third he repaired apartments.

=== Sickness and death ===
On 17 October 2017, he was admitted to the intensive care unit of the Moscow City Clinical Hospital No. 1 with a stroke, and was soon transferred to the Central Clinical Hospital No. 1 by the Presidential Administration. In January 2018 he was discharged from the hospital. After being discharged, he did not appear in public.

On 11 October 2019, it was reported that Kokshenov was taken to one of the capital's hospitals. It was clarified that the artist went to the doctors because of a wound on his leg. The doctors provided him with the necessary assistance, after which they let him go home.

For 3–4 months, the actor was hospitalized in a private center in the Krasnogorsk region for rehabilitation. Due to the quarantine, the Kokshenov did not see his relatives live for the last two months of his life – they communicated only by video link. He was supported by his wife, ex-wife and friends. On 3 June, in the clinic, Mikhail Kokshenov became ill with his heart and was placed in intensive care. On the evening of 4 June 2020, he died of acute heart failure. Farewell to the artist took place in the ritual hall of the Mitinsky crematorium on 7 June. The urn with the actor's ashes is buried in the family necropolis at the Novodevichy Cemetery.

Kokshenov died in 2020 from COVID-19.

== Selected filmography ==
- The Girls (1961) as a worker who ran into the new canteen to drink water from a decanter
- It Can't Be! (1975) as Tatiana's colleague
- How Czar Peter the Great Married Off His Moor (1976) as Sergunka Rtischev
- Incognito from St. Petersburg (1977) as Derzhimorda
- 31 June (1978) as King Meliot's servant
- Little Tragedies (1979) as Ivan
- There Was a Piano-Tuner... (1979) as Kuzma
- The Garage (1980) as shareholder-"karate"
- Sportloto-82 (1982) as Stepa, Murashko's holdman
- Dangerous for Your Life! (1985) as lieutenant Rokotov
- The Most Charming and Attractive (1985) as Lyoha Priakhin, Nadya's colleague, SRI employee
- Where is the Nophelet? (1987) as the trolley driver
- A Bright Personality (1988) as Boris Abramovich Godunov, painter
- Private Detective, or Operation Cooperation (1989) as Ambal, employee of the toilet "Comfort"
- Weather Is Good on Deribasovskaya, It Rains Again on Brighton Beach (1992) as mafioso Kravchuk

== Awards and prizes ==
- Honored Artist of the RSFSR (6 December 1983)
- People's Artist of Russia (1 July 2002)
- Order of Friendship (21 May 2007)
