= Branch of Lilac =

- Russian: Ветка сирени
- Directed by: Pavel Lungin
- Produced by: Jimmy de Brabant; Michael Dounaev
- Starring: Yevgeny Tsyganov; Liya Akhedzhakova; Oleg Andreyev; Igor Chernevich; Evdokiya Germanova; Viktoriya Isakova
- Cinematography: Andrey Zhegalov
- Edited by: Paul Carlin
- Music by: Dan Jones
- Production company: Theme Production
- Release date: 2007
- Running time: 97 min.
- Countries: Russia; Luxembourg
- Language: Russian

Branch of Lilac (Russian: Ветка сирени, romanized: Vetka sireni) is a 2007 Russian musical drama film directed by Pavel Lungin.

== Plot ==
The film tells about the great Russian composer Sergey Rachmaninov, who, according to legend, after each performance received a bouquet of white lilac from an unknown woman. He performs grueling concerts abroad. The wife cannot stand it and leaves him. And suddenly he unravels the mystery of the white lilac.

== Cast ==
- Yevgeny Tsyganov as Sergei
- Liya Akhedzhakova as Anna Sergeevna
- Oleg Andreyev as Shalyapin
- Igor Chernevich as Doctor Dahl
- Evdokiya Germanova as Aunt Satina
- Viktoriya Isakova as Anna
- Aleksey Kortnev as Steinway
- Aleksey Petrenko as Nikolai Zverev
- Miriam Sekhon as Marianna
- Viktoriya Tolstoganova as Natalya
- Evgeniy Tsyganov as Sergei
- Maksim Zausalin as third journalist
