= Practical Joke (2008 film) =

2008 film by Andrei Kudinenko

- Theatrical release poster
- Directed by: Andrei Kudinenko
- Written by: Aleksandr Kachan; Andrei Zhitkov
- Produced by: Pavel Lungin; Olga Vasilyeva
- Starring: Evgeny Dmitriev; Ivan Alekseev; Maria Gorban; Claudia Korshunova
- Cinematography: Pavel Kulakov
- Music by: Ivan Alekseev; Vladimir Eglitis
- Production company: Pavel Lungin Studio
- Release date: May 22, 2008 (Russia)
- Running time: 84 minutes
- Country: Russia
- Language: Russian
- Box office: $1 436 563

Practical Joke (Russian: Розыгрыш, romanized: Rozygrysh) is a 2008 Russian teen drama film directed by Andrei Kudinenko. It is a remake of the 1977 film of the same name by Vladimir Menshov.

== Plot ==
The story takes place in an average Moscow school. It begins with a joke by class leader Oleg Komarov, who persuades his classmates to make fun of the young English language trainee in retaliation for a barely passing grade. At the same time, a new student, Igor Glushko, joins the class. The new student amazes the teacher with his knowledge of English during his first lesson and dreams of creating a music group. Komarov realizes that his leadership position has been damaged and attempts to rectify the situation. After the first practical joke, the intern identifies the perpetrator and gives Komarov a failing grade on his homework. Komarov's father, a school sponsor, threatens Oleg with the army and punishes him. Following this, Oleg decides to orchestrate a second, more brutal practical joke. The joke is successful, but everything is eventually revealed, and it is decided that Komarov should be expelled from school. However, the head teacher suddenly calls for mercy and offers to allow Komarov to remain at school and take exams.

== Cast ==
- Evgeny Dmitriev – Oleg Komarov
- Ivan Alekseev– Igor Glushko
- Maria Gorban – Tanya Nesterova
- Claudia Korshunova – Taya Petrova
- Donatas Grudovich – Ilya Korbut
- Andrei Nazimov – Gera Zorin-Krotov
- Andrey Zhemchuzhny – Yasha Zhemchuzhny
- Irina Kupchenko– Maria Vasilievna, head teacher
- Yury Kuznetsov – Michal Mikhalych, Director
- Yana Esipovich – Vera Ivanovna, English teacher
- Dmitri Dyuzhev – Alexander Ivanovich, physical education teacher
- Evdokiya Germanova – Tay's mother
- Dmitry Kharatyan – Komarov's father
- Sergey Yushkevich – father of Zorin-Krotov
- Vsevolod Yashkin – Andrey Nikitin
- Alla Podchufarova – Baburkina
- Anna Kornilova – Alisa
- Ekaterina Kudinskaya – Ekaterina Moiseeva
- Darina Faldeeva – Komarov's sister
- Vera Zotova – Komarov's mother
- Natalia Evstigneeva – computer science teacher
- Vladimir Sychev – guard
