= The Return of Saint Luke =

- Russian: Возвращение «Святого Луки»
- Directed by: Anatoliy Bobrovsky
- Written by: Sergei Derkovsky; Nikolai Kondashov; Vladimir Kuznetsov; Boris Shustrov
- Starring: Vsevolod Sanaev; Vladislav Dvorzhetsky; Oleg Basilashvili; Yekaterina Vasilyeva; Natalya Rychagova; Valery Ryzhakov
- Cinematography: Roman Veseler
- Edited by: Lidiya Zhuchkova
- Music by: Isaac Schwarts
- Production company: Mosfilm
- Release date: 1970
- Running time: 90 minutes
- Country: Soviet Union
- Language: Russian

The Return of Saint Luke (Russian: Возвращение «Святого Луки») is a 1970 Soviet crime film directed by Anatoliy Bobrovsky.

A recidivist thief escapes from prison, steals the Holy Luke picture and wants to sell it. Colonel Zorin will try to stop the thief.

== Plot ==
Engineer Yuri Loskutov supplements his main job by engaging in the black-market trade of old icons. He has an assistant in this endeavor, a young man nicknamed Chervonets.

One of Loskutov’s clients is a foreign tourist named Keith, who requests that Loskutov steal the painting Saint Luke by Frans Hals from a museum. To carry out this plan, Loskutov organizes a criminal group. The key player in the theft is a recently escaped thief and repeat offender, Mikhail Karabanov, known as "The Count." Loskutov deceives Karabanov about the painting’s value, but Karabanov, a seasoned criminal, discovers its true worth. Unwilling to simply carry out the theft for Loskutov’s benefit, Karabanov decides to claim the entire reward. He hires an artist named Kulikov to create a replica of the painting, artificially ages it, and plans to hand over the fake to Loskutov while he himself contacts the foreign buyer.

The investigation into the painting’s theft is led by Colonel Ivan Sergeyevich Zorin of the Soviet militia. After questioning Kulikov and other witnesses, Colonel Zorin identifies the thief and, over the course of the investigation, uncovers all the parties involved in the crime.

== Cast ==
- Vsevolod Sanaev as Colonel Zorin
- Vladislav Dvorzhetsky as Mikhail Karabanov
- Oleg Basilashvili as Loskutov, an engineer
- Yekaterina Vasilyeva as Polina
- Natalya Rychagova as Zoya
- Valery Ryzhakov as Sergei
- Vladimir Smirnov as Ievlev
- Valeri Belyakov as Kulikov
- Pauls Butkēvičs as Keit, a foreign tourist (as Paul Butkevich)
- Dmitriy Masanov as Karavashkin
