= Island of Rusty General =

- Directed by: Valentin Khovenko
- Written by: Kir Bulychov
- Starring: Katya Prizhbilyak; Alexander Lenkov
- Cinematography: Felix Kefchiyan
- Music by: Maksim Dunayevsky
- Production company: Studio Ekran
- Release date: 1988
- Running time: 66 minutes
- Country: Soviet Union
- Language: Russian

Island of Rusty General (Russian: Остров ржавого генерала, romanized: Ostrov rzhavogo generala) is a 1988 Soviet children's science fiction film directed by Valentin Khovenko, based on the Island of the Rusted Lieutenant from the short story collection Adventures of Alisa by Kir Bulychov.

== Plot ==
Alisa Seleznyova, an ordinary Moscow schoolgirl of the 21st century, gets the role of the Little Red Riding Hood in a children's film and flies off for the shooting. At this time during an excavation old fighting robots are discovered and sent for remelting, but they disappear on the way by the sea. It turns out that they did not completely lose their military capabilities and were able to escape, land on an uninhabited island and begin preparations to enslave humanity. One day after leaving from the filming, Alisa ends up getting captured by them.

== Cast ==
- Katya Prizhbilyak — Alisa Seleznyova
- Alexander Lenkov — Baba Yaga
- Mikhail Danilov — director Stepan Stepanych
- Lyudmila Artemieva — Svetlana Odinokaya (voiced by Olga Gasparova)
- Stanislav Sokolov — Technician Egorushkin
- Sergey Skripkin — robot Polya
- Natalia Grigoryeva — TV announcer
- Marina Sauskan — assistant director (credited as M. Vakulina)
- Vladimir Balon — general "Big Iron" (voiced by Sergei Malishevsky)
