= Spartak Mishulin =

Soviet and Russian actor (1926–2005)

- Спартак Мишулин
- Mishulin on a 2026 Russian stamp
- Born: 22 October 1926; Moscow, Russian SFSR, Soviet Union
- Died: 17 July 2005 (aged 78); Moscow, Russia
- Resting place: Vagankovo Cemetery, Moscow
- Occupation: Actor
- Years active: 1960–2005
- Title: People's Artist of the RSFSR (1981)
- Spouse: Valentina Kazakova
- Children: 3

Spartak Vasilyevich Mishulin (Russian: Спартак Васильевич Мишулин; 22 October 1926 – 17 July 2005) was a Soviet actor and People's Artist of the RSFSR. He was best known for his roles as Sayid in White Sun of the Desert (1969) and the title character in the Soviet stage adaptation of the Swedish children's book series Karlsson-on-the-Roof (1971) at Moscow's famed Satire Theatre.

== Biography ==
Spartak Mishulin was born on October 22, 1926, in Moscow. His mother, Anna Vasilievna Mishulina, was deputy to the People's Commissar of Industry and was a member of the party nomenklatura. The name Spartak was given at the insistence of his maternal uncle, a well-known historian, Professor Alexander Vasilyevich Mishulin, who specialized in the War of Spartacus. The Mishulins' family lived in the center of Moscow on Nastasinsky Lane. Spartak from an early age was fascinated by the theater and dreamed of becoming an actor.

In 1937, Anna Mishulina was arrested as an enemy of the people and exiled to Tashkent, and Spartak remained in the care of his uncle Alexander Mishulin, who held the post of rector of the Academy of Social Sciences under the Central Committee of the Communist Party. After the outbreak of the Great Patriotic War, the Mishulin family found themselves in evacuation in Dzerzhinsk.

In 1941, Spartak Mishulin entered the artillery school in Anzhero-Sudzhensk by mistake, he misunderstood its name which was a portmanteau word (Russian: артспецшкола, romanized: artspezshkola) and thought that it was an acting school. After studying at the artillery school, he committed a misdemeanor for which he served a 1.5 year sentence. In the labor camp Spartak met his uncle's personal driver by chance, also a fellow convict. The driver was the head of the mill and took the young man as his subordinate water carrier. After a while he was caught bringing grain instead of water to the prisoners, thereby prolonging his term for another year and a half.

But even in the labor camp he did not cease to engage in amateur activities. Once he was noticed by a club manager and was invited to his village Brusovo Udomelsky District of the Kalinin region. For a while, Mishulin worked as a manager at the Brusovo club, and later in various provincial theaters. Afterwards his relatives found him.

In the early 1950s, after failing to enter Russian Academy of Theatre Arts, Spartak Mishulin was sent to the auxiliary staff of Kalinin Drama Theater; having graduated from the theater studio at this theater and for the first five years of working on the stage having played about 40 roles, Mishulin moved to the troupe of the Omsk Drama Theater, then returned to Kalinin. In 1957 he joined the CPSU.

In 1960, after the tour of the Kalinin Theater in Moscow, Mishulin was invited to the three capital's theaters – Lenkom Theatre, Russian Army Theatre and Moscow Satire Theatre. Having chosen the Satire Theatre, he served there continuously for 45 years. The first episodes of the television series Pub "13 Chairs", in which he performed the role of Pan Director, brought wide popularity to the actor. His popularity grew even more after performing the role of Tarakanov in the film Property of the Republic, as well as demonstrations on television of the plays of the Satire Theatre "Kid and Karlsson-on-the-Roof" and "Small Comedies of the Big House", but especially after the role of Sayid in the film Vladimir Motyl White Sun of the Desert.

One of his longest-running roles in the theater was the role of Karlsson-on-the-Roof, whom he played for almost 40 years.

In 1992, Aleksandr Shirvindt staged a performance in the theater according to his own scenario – benefit concert of Mishulin "Spartak" (Mishulin) – "Spectator" (national team).

Spartak Mishulin died on 17 July 2005 in Moscow at the age of 79 from heart failure. He was buried at the Vagankovo cemetery.

== Family ==
His wife is Valentina Konstantinovna Mishulina (Kazakova) (born 1945). Daughter Karina Spartakovna Mishulina (born 1979).

== Partial filmography ==
Mishulin as Sayid in White Sun of the Desert

- White Sun of the Desert (Белое солнце пустыни", 1970) as Sayid
- V tridevyatom tsarstve (1970)
- Property of the Republic (Достояние республики, 1972) as Ilya Tarakanov
- Tolko ty (1972) as Yakov Plutarkhovich Nakonechnikov
- Potseluy Chanity (1974) as Police Prefect
- Kysh i Dvaportfelya (1974) as Vasin
- Avtomobil, skripka i sobaka Klyaksa (1975)
- Au-u! (1976) (segment "Chto nasha zhizn'!? ili Chto nasha zhizn'!?)"
- Tri dnya prazdnika (1982) as Director
- Talisman (1983) as Director
- Ostorozhno, Vasilyok (1985)
- Khorosho sidim! (1986)
- A Man from the Boulevard des Capucines (Человек с бульвара Капуцинов, 1987) as chief of the Comanches
- Private Detective, or Operation Cooperation (Частный детектив, или Операция "Кооперация", 1990) as Georgy Mikhailovich Puzyrev
- Ocharovannyy strannik (1990) as Gypsy
- Babnik (1990)
- Verbovshchik (1991)
- Shchen iz sozvezdiya Gonchikh psov (1991)
- Chyortov pyanitsa (1991)
- Vystrel v grobu (1992)
- Vozdushnye piraty (1992)
- Weather Is Good on Deribasovskaya, It Rains Again on Brighton Beach (На Дерибасовской хорошая погода, или На Брайтон-Бич опять идут дожди, 1993) as Eunuch
- Bravye parni (1993) as Maj. Kazbek Pamirov
- Bulvarnyy roman (1994)
- Bednaya Sasha (1997)
- Bremenskie muzykanty (2001) as Detective
- Nochnoy prodavets (2005) as Customer
- Asiris Nuna (Азирис Нуна, 2006) as watchman
- The Master and Margarita (Мастер и Маргарита, 2006) as Archibald Archibaldovich
