= Private Detective, or Operation Cooperation =

- Directed by: Leonid Gaidai
- Written by: Leonid Gaidai; Arkady Inin; Yuriy Volovich
- Starring: Dmitry Kharatyan; Irina Feofanova; Roman Madyanov
- Cinematography: Igor Chernykh
- Music by: Aleksandr Zatsepin
- Production company: Mosfilm
- Release date: 1990
- Running time: 89 min.
- Country: Soviet Union
- Language: Russian
- Budget: 10
- Box office: 10

Private Detective, or Operation Cooperation or (Russian: Частный детектив, или Операция «Кооперация», romanized: Chastnyy detektiv, ili operatsiya "Kooperatsiya") is a 1990 Soviet comedy film directed by Leonid Gaidai.

== Plot ==
In the last years of the USSR, the free market begins to emerge. The economy picks up, but changes in many ways. Cooperatives—privately owned businesses—open everywhere as a new age of entrepreneurship dawns.

Dmitry Puzyrev, a young man addicted to detective novels, decides to open the city's first private detective agency. Initially, Dmitry has a hard time getting the required license, but gets it with the help of his friend, Victor. Dmitry and his father furnish the agency's office, but can't find any clients. The local police chief, Major Cronin, highly disapproves of their venture.

At the same time, Lena Pukhova, a young journalist, is searching for stories for her newspaper and goes undercover, disguising herself as an alcoholic prostitute. Soon, she gets the assignment to profile Dimitry's agency. Lena meets Dmitry, who immediately falls in love with her.

The agency gets its first real client, Anna Petrovna, who asks Dmitry to track down her kidnapped husband Ivan Ivanovich, Chairman of the "Joy Cooperative", a leading business. Dmitry launches an investigation, with Lena constantly but unwittingly getting in his way. Dmitry tries looking for the car used by the kidnappers, which can put him on their trail, but to no avail.

The kidnappers soon make themselves known by demanding a ransom for Ivan Ivanovich. With the help of his father, Dmitry decides to stage an ambush but then falls into the clutches of the villains, along with Lena, who happens to be Ivan Ivanovich's daughter. In a plot twist, the leader of the crooks turns out to be Victor, Dmitry's friend.

Realizing that his plan has been foiled, Victor decides to kill the gang's prisoners: Dmitry, Lena, and her father. Only the courage and resourcefulness of Dmitry make it possible to stop the criminals.

== Cast ==
- Dmitry Kharatyan – Dmitry Puzyrev, private detective
- Irina Feofanova – Lena Pukhova, journalist (voiced by Nadezhda Rumyantseva)
- Spartak Mishulin – Georgy Mikhailovich Puzyrev, Dmitry's father
- Mikhail Svetin – Ivan Ivanovich Pukhov, Lena's father
- Nina Grebeshkova – Anna Petrovna Pukhova, Lena's mother
- Aleksandr Belyavsky – Major Kazimir Afanasyevich Cronin
- Leonid Kuravlyov – Semyon Semyonovich Sukhov, editor in chief
- Roman Madyanov – Victor, owner of the private public toilet "Comfort"
- Mikhail Kokshenov – Ambal, employee of the toilet "Comfort"
- Mentay Utepbergenov – Mao, employee of the toilet "Comfort"
- Evgeny Zharikov – "Professor", bootlegger

in episodes

- Leonid Yarmolnik – airliner hijacker
- Semyon Farada – Signore Concini, Italian Mafioso
- Muza Krepkogorskaya – gossiping neighbor
- Nikolay Parfyonov – N.I. Mogilny, chairman of the executive committee
- Vera Ivleva – N.B. Piratova, member of executive committee
- Viktor Filippov – S.P. Zahrebetny, member of executive committee
- Viktor Uralskiy – L.A. Atasovich, member of executive committee
- Nikolay Malikov – D.P. Pogrebnyuk, member of executive committee
- Yuri Vorobyov – G.B. Mertvago patriotic member of executive committee
- Sergey Filippov – angry old man
- Nikolai Rybnikov – MP candidate
- Natalya Krachkovskaya – airliner lady passenger
- Emmanuil Geller – airliner passenger No.1
- Vladimir Druzhnikov – airliner passenger No.2
- Nina Agapova – gypsy woman, chairman of the cooperative "Destiny"
- Anna Shatilova – cameo

== Production ==
Filming took place in Odessa from March to September 1989. In the film a group of policemen called "ZnaToKi" operate - a parody of the famous characters of the TV series "Investigation Held by ZnaToKi" and "Major Pronin" (Major Cronin).
