= Pauls Butkēvičs =

Latvian actor (1940–2026)

- Born: 8 August 1940; Riga, Latvian SSR, USSR
- Died: 12 June 2026 (aged 85)
- Occupation: Actor
- Years active: 1965–2026

Pauls Butkēvičs (8 August 1940 – 12 June 2026) was a Latvian film and theater actor, best known for starring in I Remember Everything, Richard and Elpojiet dziļi! (1967, also known as Četri balti krekli). He also starred in Ilgais ceļš kāpās, Rallijs (1978), Nepabeigtās vakariņas (1979), Mirāža (1981) and Aija (1987).

== Background ==
After graduating from Riga Secondary School No. 11 in 1959, Butkēvičs enrolled at the Riga Polytechnical Institute and started work as an automatic phone line regulator at VEF. At the same time he performed at the Roberts Ligers Riga Pantomime Ensemble from 1957 to 1959 and the Experimental studio no. 3 of the Dailes Theatre from 1959 to 1961. Later he studied at the Law and the History and Philosophy faculties of the University of Latvia and the Choir Conductor Section of the Latvian Conservatory of Music from 1964 to 1966.

His life partner was Zinta Jansone, a former costume designer for Latvian Television. Butkēvičs died on 12 June 2026, at the age of 85.

== Career ==
Butkēvičs starred in approximately 150 films both in Latvia and abroad. He was awarded the title of Merited Artist of the Russian SFSR in 1990.

== Other interests ==
The actor said that to complete his life's work he wants to write a play, play in it, write a book and record a music album.

=== Writing ===
Butkēvičs was still living in Jūrmala, where his neighbor journalist Vija Apinīte was very excited about making a biographical book about Butkēvičs. After the actor had collected his material and put the thoughts about his life and roles on paper, she systematized it all and in 2001 they published the biography Kājām pa Ugunszemi (Sol Vita). While teaching at a musical acting course in Baltic Russian Institute, he wrote the musical play Es visur aicināts un izraidīts, based on 15th to 20th century Russian poetry. Sung in Russian on the stage of Daugavpils Theatre, it premiered on 13 January 2005 and has been shown in several schools, recreation centers and libraries as well as road-shows in Russia.

=== Music ===
Butkēvičs together with the army ensemble Zvaigznīte (Little Star) performed the original soundtrack of the movie Elpojiet dziļi! (Breathe Deeply!). Surprisingly enough, even though the film itself was not shown to public till the end of 80s, its songs, written by the acclaimed Latvian composer Imants Kalniņš, became very popular among Latvian society, and later were performed by Latvian bands ‘Menuets’ and ‘Turaidas roze’. However, as, for example, Hardijs Lediņš put it: ‘I think that nobody has performed the songs by Imants Kalniņš better than Pauls Butkēvičs, - neither ‘Menuets’, nor ‘Turaidas roze’ did’ The members of the ensemble ‘Zvaigznīte’ included such later well-known Latvian musicians as Uldis Stabulnieks, Gunārs Rozenbergs, Dzintars Beķeris, Valdis Eglītis, Andris Vilsons and Jūnijs Vilsons. In 2008 Pauls Butkevics together with Elina Cileviča engaged in a new musical project and recorded an album Tu esi, Tu biji, Tu būsi. Butkevics dreams of recording another album in the future with the songs in Russian of his performance 'Es visur aicināts un izraidīts'.

== Filmography ==
- Es visu atceros, Ričard (Я всё помню, Ричард, 1966) as Zigis Purmalis
- Elpojiet dziļi! (1967) as Ralfs
- Silnye dukhom (1967)
- Daleko na zapade (1968)
- Troynaya proverka (1969)
- The Return of Saint Luke (1970) as Keit, a foreign tourist
- Waterloo (1970/I) (uncredited) as Officer with Wellington
- Gorod pod lipami (Epizody geroicheskoy oborony) (Pilsēta zem liepām, 1971)
- Shakh koroleve brilliantov (1973)
- Seventeen Moments of Spring (Семнадцать мгновений весны, 1973) as Agent (unknown episodes)
- If You Want to Be Happy (1974)
- Gnev (1974)
- Rallijs (Rallye / Ралли, 1978)
- Almaznaya tropa (1978)
- The Fortress (1978) also known as Kristman
- Agent sekretnoy sluzhby (1978)
- Aquanauts (1979) as Dugovsky
- The Fairfax Millions (1980)
- Unfinished Supper (Nepabeigtās vakariņas / Незаконченный ужин, 1980) as Backlund
- Ispanskiy variant (1980)
- Korpus generala Shubnikova (1980)
- Koltso iz Amsterdama (1981)
- Sindikat-2 (1981) as Krikman
- The Error of Tony Wendis (1981) as Max
- Nezhnost k revushemu zveryu (1982) as Sanin
- Incident at Map Grid 36-80 (Случай в квадрате 36–80, 1982) as Terner
- Seven elements (1984)
- Nabat na rassvete (1985)
- Day of Wrath (1985)
- Bagrationi (1985)
- Sem krikov v okeane (1986)
- The Dolphin's Cry (1986)
- Ot zarplaty do zarplaty (1986)
- Perekhvat (1986)
- Bez sroka davnosti (1986)
- Za yavnym preimushchestvom (1986) as Sumarokov
- Gardemarines ahead! (Гардемарины, вперёд!, 1988) as Berger
- The Adventures of Quentin Durward, Marksman of the Royal Guard (1988)
- Sluchay v aeroportu (1988) (TV)
- Rokovaya oshibka (1988)
- Viva Gardes-Marines! (Виват, гардемарины!, 1991) as Frederick the Great
- The Shroud of Alexander Nevsky (1992)
- Three Days in August (1992)
- The Hounds of Riga (Hundarna av Riga, 1995) as Col. Potris (Putnis)
- The Hostage (Ķīlnieks, 2006) as Antons
