= Shamuhammed Akmuhammedov =

- Akmuhammedov in 2009
- Born: 8 September 1937
- Died: 2010 (aged 72–73); Ashgabat, Turkmenistan
- Education: Moscow State Academic Art Institute
- Known for: Officers; Smerti net, rebyata
- Awards: People's Artist of Turkmenistan

Shamuhammed "Shadzhan" Akmuhammedov (Russian: Шамухаммед (Шаджан) Акмухаммедов; born 1937 - died 2010) was a Turkmen artist and actor. In 1971, he played the part of the Basmach rebel Kerim in the hit film Officers.

== Career ==
Akmuhammedov studied at the Turkmen State Art College named after Shota Rustaveli, where he was also active as a musician. He then studied at the Moscow State Academic Art Institute. After graduation, he returned to Turkmenistan and began working as an artist in the Ashgabat Academic Drama Theater.

Akmuhammedov headed the Turkmen Union of Artists in the late 1970s and early 1980s. In the late 80s he was deputy minister of culture of the Turkmen SSR. He headed the Culture Fund of Turkmenistan for more than fifteen years. After 1992, he taught theatre design at the National Academy of Arts. Akmuhammedov also had a long and active career as a painter. He was one of seven Turkmen artists who made up the informal group "Semerka" (Seven). The others in the group were Mammad Mammadov, Durdy Bayramov, Chary Amangeldyev, Stanislav Babikov, Kulnazar Bekmuradov and Juma Dzhumadurdy.

Akmukhammedov is a significant figure in the visual arts of Turkmenistan. His works are stored in various museums in Turkmenistan, Kazakhstan and Russia, as well as in private collections. In 1986, Anatoly Kantorn wrote a book-album Shamuhammed Akmuhammedov, dedicated to the artist.

His son Ovez is also an artist and teacher at the Turkmen State Specialized Art School at the Academy of Arts.

Akmuhammedov died in Ashgabat in 2010.
