= Gardes-Marines III =

- Directed by: Svetlana Druzhinina
- Written by: Yuri Nagibin; Svetlana Druzhinina; Nina Sorotokina
- Starring: Dmitry Kharatyan; Mikhail Mamaev; Yevgeniy Yevstigneyev; Lyudmila Gurchenko; Kristina Orbakaitė
- Cinematography: Anatoly Mukasei
- Music by: Victor Lebedev
- Production company: Mosfilm
- Release date: 1992
- Running time: 107 min.
- Countries: Soviet Union; Russia; Germany
- Language: Russian

Gardes-Marines III or (Russian: Гардемарины III, romanized: Gardemariny III) is a 1992 Soviet/Russian two-part television movie (mini-series). It is the third in a series of films about Russian Gardes-Marines of the 18th century. All three films were directed by Svetlana Druzhinina.

== Plot ==
In the Seven Years' War, Russian soldiers are compelled to fight for the interests of France and Austria against Prussia. The midshipmen continue to serve their homeland selflessly. One - on the expedition, the other - at the court, and the third sent to Venice, to transfer the box with the decoration. In fact, the box contains the message on which the future destinies of Europe and Russia depend.

== Cast ==
- Dmitry Kharatyan – Aleksei Korsak, captain
- Mikhail Mamaev – Nikita Olenev (voice by Andrey Gradov)
- Aleksandr Domogarov – Pavel Gorin
- Viktor Rakov – Baron von Brockdorf
- Kristina Orbakaitė – Grand Duchess Ekaterina Alekseevna, "Princess Fiquet", future Empress Catherine the Great
- Lyudmila Gurchenko – Joanna Elisabeth of Holstein-Gottorp, Ekaterina's mother
- Natalya Gundareva – Elizabeth of Russia
- Yevgeniy Yevstigneyev – Alexey Bestuzhev-Ryumin, Chancellor of Russian Empire
- Herb Andress – Frederick the Great (voice by Armen Dzhigarkhanyan)
- Barbara Rudnik – Elisabeth Christine of Brunswick-Wolfenbüttel-Bevern
- Yury Yakovlev – Field-marshal Stepan Fyodorovich Apraksin
- Lev Durov – Cavalry general Denisov
- Nahla Jaman – Petra (voice by Marina Dyuzheva)
- Vladimir Shiryaev – Frederick's physician

== Soundtrack ==
- "Do not hang your nose!" (Не вешать нос!) – Dmitry Kharatyan and Aleksandr Domogarov
- "Offense is cheap in Russia" (Дёшева обида на Руси) – Dmitry Kharatyan
