= Funny Story =

Funny Story may refer to:

- Funny Story (film), by Michael J. Gallagher
- Funny Story (novel), by Emily Henry

== See also ==
- Funny Stories, 1962 Soviet children's film
