= Vladimir Balon =

Soviet and Russian actor

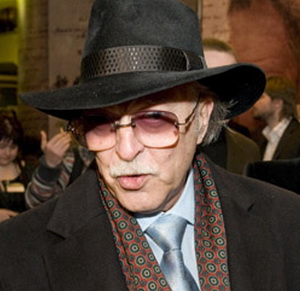
- Born: Vladimir Yakovlevich Balon; 23 February 1937; Leningrad, USSR
- Died: 2 February 2013 (aged 75); Moscow, Russia
- Years active: 1962–2013
- Spouse: Jella Agafonova

Vladimir Yakovlevich Balon (Russian: Владимир Яковлевич Балон; 23 February 1937 in Leningrad – 2 February 2013 in Moscow) was a Soviet and Russian actor, a professional fencer, Master of sports of the USSR (1956), champion of the USSR in fencing (juniors, 1958, adults 1961) foil, stunt. Since 1990 to 2002 was the director of the studio Mosfilm-Autotrake.

== Selected filmography ==
- Hussar Ballad (Russian: Гусарская баллада, 1962) as Kutuzov's adjutant
- Give Me a Book of Complaints (Дайте жалобную книгу, 1965) as journalist, Yuri Nikitin's friend
- They're Calling, Open the Door (Звонят, откройте дверь, 1966) as teacher of fencing
- Anna Karenina (Анна Каренина, 1967) as officer at the races (uncredited)
- Sea Tales (Морские рассказы, 1967) as Vladimir Yakovlevich
- Nikolai Bauman (Николай Бауман, 1967) as Ilya Sats
- Step Off the Roof (Шаг с крыши, 1970) as musketeer Moruak
- D'Artagnan and Three Musketeers (д'Артаньян и три мушкетёра, 1978) as de Jussac
- Gardes-Marines, Ahead! (Гардемарины, вперёд!, 1988) as Jacques
- Island of Rusty General (Остров ржавого генерала, 1988) as general
- Stalin's Funeral (Похороны Сталина, 1990) as doctor
- Viva Gardes-Marines! (Виват, гардемарины!, 1991) as Jacques
- Musketeers Twenty Years After (Мушкетёры двадцать лет спустя, 1992) as de Jussac
- The Return of the Musketeers, or The Treasures of Cardinal Mazarin (Возвращение мушкетёров, или Сокровища кардинала Мазарини, 2007) as de Jussac
