= Sea Tales =

- Russian poster
- Russian: Морские рассказы
- Directed by: Aleksey Sakharov; Aleksandr Svetlov
- Written by: Aleksey Sakharov; Aleksandr Svetlov
- Starring: Nikolay Dostal; Viktor Zadubrovsky; Vladimir Balashov; Anatoliy Alekseev; Vladimir Balon
- Cinematography: Anatoliy Mukasey
- Music by: Yuri Levitin
- Release date: 1967
- Country: Soviet Union
- Language: Russian

Sea Tales (Russian: Морские рассказы) is a 1967 Soviet adventure film directed by Aleksey Sakharov and Aleksandr Svetlov.

The film consists of two short stories. In the first story the Russian sailor Nikolay and the former bullfighter Spaniard Jose Maria take a boat, the owner of which plans to flood him in order to get insurance. In the second short story, friends become sailors on the Jupiter ship and are given the task of delivering an underground newspaper to Odessa...

== Plot ==
Story: "The Scheme" On an old steamship, sailors Kolya Chumachenko and a Spaniard named José María—a former bullfighter nicknamed "Mashka" by the crew—become suspicious of the captain's unusual behavior. The captain, in a prior conversation with the ship’s owner, had agreed to sink the vessel at the first opportunity to claim a large insurance payout. Every member of the crew was offered a share of the scheme’s proceeds. Kolya and José flatly refused the bribe. Fearing the two would report the plan to the authorities, the ship’s navigator, Spirka, threw José overboard one night.

Against all odds, José survived and later reunited with Kolya in Odessa. Together, they exacted a harsh revenge on their betrayers.

Story: "The Scorpion and the Cotton" Set in early 20th-century Odessa, two friends, recently released from prison and struggling to find work, eventually secure positions on a respectable steamship, Jupiter, which sails between Odessa and Turkish ports. The friends are approached by underground Bolshevik activists who persuade them to smuggle illegal newspapers from Constantinople.

During a routine inspection at the port, the contraband was discovered by the famous customs officer Petrenko, nicknamed "The Scorpion," known for his sharp instincts. Convinced there was an informant aboard the ship, Kolya devised a clever plan to identify the snitch and publicly humiliate "The Scorpion," ensuring the contraband’s safe transport.

== Cast ==
- Nikolay Dostal as Jose-Maria Damec
- Viktor Zadubrovsky as Nikolay Chumachenko
- Vladimir Balashov as Leontiy Andreich
- Anatoliy Alekseev as Supervisor
- Vladimir Balon as Vladimir Yakovlevich
- Arseniy Barskiy as Inspector
- Eduard Bredun as Zuyev
- Yevgeny Morgunov as «Singer»
