= Son of the Regiment =

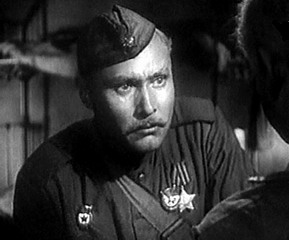
- Hryhoriy Pluzhnyk as Bidenko
- Russian: Сын полка
- Directed by: Vasili Pronin
- Written by: Valentin Kataev
- Starring: Yuri Yankin; Aleksandr Morozov; Pavel Volkov; Nikolai Parfyonov; Hryhoriy Pluzhnyk
- Cinematography: Grigori Garibyan
- Music by: Anatoli Lepin
- Release date: 1946
- Country: Soviet Union

Son of the Regiment, (Russian: Сын полка) is a 1946 Soviet World War II film, directed by Vasili Pronin.

== Plot ==
During the war, one boy turns out to be without parents and he goes into the reconnaissance. Against the background of battles with the Nazis, the guy is sent to the Suvorov doctrine.

== Cast ==
- Yuri Yankin as Vanya Sojntsev (as Yura Yankin)
- Aleksandr Morozov as Capt. Yenakiyev
- Pavel Volkov as Sergeant Vasili Ivanovich Kovalyov
- Nikolay Parfyonov as Gorbunov
- Hryhoriy Pluzhnyk as Bidenko
- Vladimir Sinev as Cpl. Voznesensky (as Vova Sinev)
- Arkadi Arkadyev
- Aleksandr Timontayev
- Sofya Garrel
- Stanislav Chekan
- Nikolai Yakhontov
