= The Casket of Maria Medici =

- Russian: Ларец Марии Медичи
- Directed by: Rudolf Fruntov
- Written by: Rudolf Fruntov; Yeremey Parnov
- Starring: Valery Ryzhakov; Klara Luchko; Emmanuil Vitorgan; Yevdokiya Urusova; Anatoliy Egorov
- Cinematography: Igor Gelein; Vladimir Kromas; Vladimir Stepanov
- Edited by: N. Belyovtseva
- Music by: Mikhail Ziv
- Production company: Mosfilm
- Release date: May 28, 1980
- Running time: 91 min.
- Country: Soviet Union
- Language: Russian

The Casket of Maria Medici (Russian: Ларец Марии Медичи, romanized: Larets Marii Medichi) is a 1980 Soviet historical action film directed by Rudolf Fruntov.

Antiquary Savigny suddenly disappears without a trace. Investigators conclude that he was killed. The captain of the militsiya sets off on a journey through time to solve the crime and open the secret of the medieval.

== Plot ==
=== Prologue ===
In medieval France in 1244, crusaders lay siege to the fortress of Montségur, leading to the demise of the Albigensians—followers of a doctrine considered heretical by the Catholic Church. Before their fall, they manage to smuggle and hide their treasures. The secret to this hidden cache is passed down through the descendants of four guardians, each entrusted with a gem, a star, and a chest. When the gems are aligned, they reveal a specific spot on a map hidden inside the chest, marking the treasure’s location. The mystery can only be solved if all four gems are brought together and the chest is unlocked.

=== Main Plot ===
In early 1970s Soviet Leningrad, a French antiquities dealer named Vincent Savigny mysteriously disappears. Around the same time, an elderly woman named Vera Charskaya is robbed of her heirloom chest. As authorities investigate Savigny’s disappearance, they initially suspect murder, only to discover that he is actually Vsevolod Yurievich Svinin, the son of White émigrés. During World War II, Svinin betrayed his allegiance and collaborated with the Nazis in an attempt to uncover the Albigensians' secret, even going so far as to force a young girl, Madeleine, and her mother, descendants of Montségur, to witness a brutal execution. After seizing part of the treasure by force, he left lasting trauma on his witnesses. Years later, in Leningrad, the now-married Madeleine Locar encounters the aged Svinin by chance and attempts to poison him, but fails. Captain Vladimir Lyusin, with the aid of historian and expert Yuri Berezovsky, must delve into both recent crimes and this ancient mystery rooted in the 13th century to uncover the secrets of the old chest and the motives behind the unfolding events.

== Cast ==
- Valery Ryzhakov as Vladimir Lyusin, police captain
- Klara Luchko as Madeleine Locard
- Emmanuil Vitorgan as Svinin (Savigny)
- Yevdokiya Urusova as Vera Fabianovna Charskaya
- Anatoliy Egorov as Berezovsky
- Ruben Simonov as Kazarian
- Leonid Obolensky as Bertrand Marti
- Vsevolod Safonov as Colonel Golovin
- Sergey Martynov as Mikhailov
- Daniil Netrebin as Vanashnyi
- Lev Polyakov as Krelin
