= Telegram (film) =

- Russian poster
- Russian: Телеграмма
- Directed by: Rolan Bykov
- Written by: Semyon Lungin; Ilya Nusinov
- Starring: Nina Arkhipova; Elya Baskin; Valentina Berezutskaya; Yuri Nikulin; Nikolay Burlyaev; Mikhail Yanshin
- Cinematography: Anatoly Mukasei
- Edited by: Lyudmila Yelyan
- Music by: Mikhail Meerovich
- Production company: Mosfilm
- Release date: 1971
- Running time: 90 minutes
- Country: Soviet Union
- Language: Russian

Telegram (Russian: Телеграмма, romanized: Telegramma) is a 1971 Soviet children's adventure film directed by Rolan Bykov.

== Plot ==
The film tells about the boys who are looking for Katya Inozemtseva to give her an important telegram and they learn about her exploits.

== Cast ==
- Nina Arkhipova as Katya Inozemtseva
- Elya Baskin as school teacher
- Yuri Nikulin as Fedor Fedorovich
- Valentina Berezutskaya as pies seller
- Nikolay Burlyaev as Gleb, Zina's son
- Rolan Bykov as singing newcomer
- Lyudmila Cherepanova as guitar player's girlfriend
- Aleksandra Denisova as Varya's grandmother
- Rina Zelyonaya as children's writer
- Mikhail Yanshin as Nikolay Afanasevich Pyatipal
- Valentina Telegina as Marya Ivanovna, Fedor Fedorovich's wife
- Sergey Shustitsky as Lyosha Shaforostov
- Valery Ryzhakov as Gleb's friend
- Roman Filippov as episode
