= Officers (film) =

- Directed by: Vladimir Rogovoy
- Written by: Kirill Rapoport; Boris Vasilyev
- Starring: Georgi Yumatov; Vasily Lanovoy; Alina Pokrovskaya; Aleksandr Voevodin; Vladimir Druzhnikov; Yevgeny Vesnik; Valery Ryzhakov
- Cinematography: Mikhail Kirillov
- Edited by: A. Ovcharova
- Music by: Rafail Khozak
- Production company: Gorky Film Studio
- Release date: 1971
- Running time: 96 minutes
- Country: Soviet Union
- Language: Russian

Officers (Russian: Офицеры, romanized: Ofitsery) is a Soviet drama film, shot at the Gorky Film Studio (Central Film Studio for Children named after Maxim Gorky) in 1971 by director Vladimir Rogovoy.

The premiere of the movie took place in the Soviet Union July 26, 1971. At the box office the film attracted about 53.4 million viewers.

The film depicts the decades-long friendship between two soldiers, Aleksey Trofimov and Ivan Varavva, over the course of multiple conflicts, including the Russian Civil War, the Chinese Civil War, the Spanish Civil War, and the Great Patriotic War. In the peace that follows, they meet again, as generals.

== Plot ==
The film spans from the early 1920s to the late 1960s, beginning during the Russian Civil War. Young cadet Alexei Trofimov is assigned to a remote Central Asian garrison, where he arrives with his wife, Lyuba. There, his commander's words, "There is such a profession—to defend the Motherland," leave a lasting impression. Alexei befriends Ivan Varava, a young officer, and together they capture a local bandit leader. Alexei's first son, named Yegor after his fallen commander, is born here. Over time, Alexei's and Ivan's paths diverge, but Varava asks that Alexei name his future grandson Ivan. As the years pass, Alexei's military career leads him to various conflicts, including in China as a military adviser and in Spain, where he is wounded. Meanwhile, Yegor grows up with dreams of becoming an officer, while Lyuba studies medicine.

When World War II erupts, both Alexei and Yegor go to the front, and Lyuba leads a military medical train. At one stop, Yegor's beloved Masha leaves their newborn son, Ivan, with Lyuba to join the frontlines as a radio operator. In a harrowing attack by German tanks, Lyuba's train is nearly overrun until Soviet reinforcements arrive. Among the fallen, she recognizes her son's photo. After the war, Alexei, now a Hero of the Soviet Union and major general, commands the division his son served in. His grandson Ivan, a Suvorov Military School cadet, is disciplined yet occasionally mischievous, and once lands in trouble for visiting the zoo without permission. When Alexei is offered a position in Moscow, he consults with Lyuba, who decides to stay with the division to honor Yegor's memory. In the film's final scenes, Ivan, now a paratrooper captain, is promoted to major for exemplary service, while memories of Alexei's and Varava's wartime bravery blend with archival footage, symbolizing the enduring legacy of the Trofimov family's commitment to their country.

== Cast ==
- Georgi Yumatov as Aleksey Trofimov
- Vasily Lanovoy as Ivan Varavva
- Alina Pokrovskaya as Lyubov Trofimova
- Aleksandr Voevodin as Georgy Trofimov
- Vladimir Druzhnikov as Georgi Petrovich, squadron commander
- Yevgeny Vesnik as paramedic
- Valery Ryzhakov as Yury Sergeyev, Guard Captain
- Shamuhammed Akmuhammedov as Kerim
- Muza Krepkogorskaya as Anna Vasilyevna

== Awards ==
- Soviet Screen Award — best actor (Vasily Lanovoy)
- Prize and diploma of the Czechoslovak Workers Film Festival
