= Day of Wrath (1985 film) =

- Directed by: Sulambek Mamilov
- Written by: Aleksandr Lapshin
- Starring: Juozas Budraitis; Aleksei Petrenko; Anatoly Ivanov
- Cinematography: Aleksandr Rybin
- Music by: Giya Kancheli
- Production company: Gorky Film Studio
- Release date: 1985
- Running time: 84 minutes
- Country: Soviet Union
- Language: Russian

Day of Wrath (Russian: День гнева, romanized: Den gneva) is a 1985 Soviet science fiction horror film directed by Sulambek Mamilov, based on the 1968 sci-fi novel The Day of Wrath (Den gneva) of Sever Gansovsky.

== Plot ==
Journalist Betli (Juozas Budraitis) is investigating a mysterious zone in which people become lost and strange events occur. He is met by the forester Meller (Aleksei Petrenko), who tells that in the forest there used to be a laboratory in which the scientist-geneticist Fiedler (Anatoly Ivanov) conducted experiments. As a result of genetic experiments, Fiedler created a new race of bear-like creatures, but with human intellect and called them otarks. But unlike people, otarks have no emotions or universal morals. They catch people and carry out their own experiments on them which leads to the inhabitants of the villages surrounding the forest being afraid of them. The forester catches and kills the otarks, but in the end both him and Betli are killed. Betli has time to record the whole story on camera, heard from otarks and from Meller, and calls the scientist to trial. After the death of the journalist, the villagers arm themselves and destroy the otarks, hereby causing the Day of Wrath.

== Cast ==
- Juozas Budraitis — journalist Betli
- Aleksei Petrenko — forester Meller
- Anatoly Ivanov — Fiedler
- Vladimir Ivashov — Caste
- Evgeni Dvorzhetsky — unkempt man
- Pavel Makhotin — chairman of the commission
- Paul Butkevich — member of the government commission
- Svetlana Svetlichnaya — a woman from ruins
- Grazhyna Baikshtite — Betli's wife
- Konstantin Zakharchenko — Stenglik
- Marina Fominova — Stenglik's wife
- Mariana Polteva — Tina
