= Adventures of Krosh =

1961 film

- Russian: Приключения Кроша
- Directed by: Genrikh Oganisyan
- Written by: Anatoly Rybakov
- Starring: Nikolai Tomashevsky; Andrei Yurenyov; Nikita Mikhalkov; I. Pogrebenko; V. Beliakova
- Cinematography: V. Dulzev; Viktor Grishin
- Music by: Andrei Volkonsky
- Release date: 1961
- Country: Soviet Union
- Language: Russian

Adventures of Krosh (Russian: Приключения Кроша, romanized: Priklyucheniya Krosha) is a 1961 Soviet teen adventure film directed by Genrikh Oganisyan based on the book by Anatoly Rybakov.

== Plot ==
A group of former ninth-graders carpool to their summer internship at a motor depot that sponsors their school. They quickly get involved in work and spend time with benefits. But Seryozha Krasheninnikov (Krosh), having no technical inclinations, feels out of place. The boys decide to fix a decommissioned car but parts keep on disappearing, leading to a series of unfortunate events. Krosh begins to play the role of a detective.

== Cast ==
- Nikolai Tomashevsky as Krosh
- Andrei Yurenyov as Igor
- Nikita Mikhalkov as Vadim
- I. Pogrebenko as Shmakov
- V. Beliakova as Maika
- E. Loginova as Nadya
- V. Sukhanov as Polekutin
- M. Sysuev as Taranov
- Svetlana Balashova as Vera Semechkina (as S. Balashova)
- Nikolay Parfyonov as Vladimir Georgiyevich
