= Evdokiya Germanova =

Russian actress

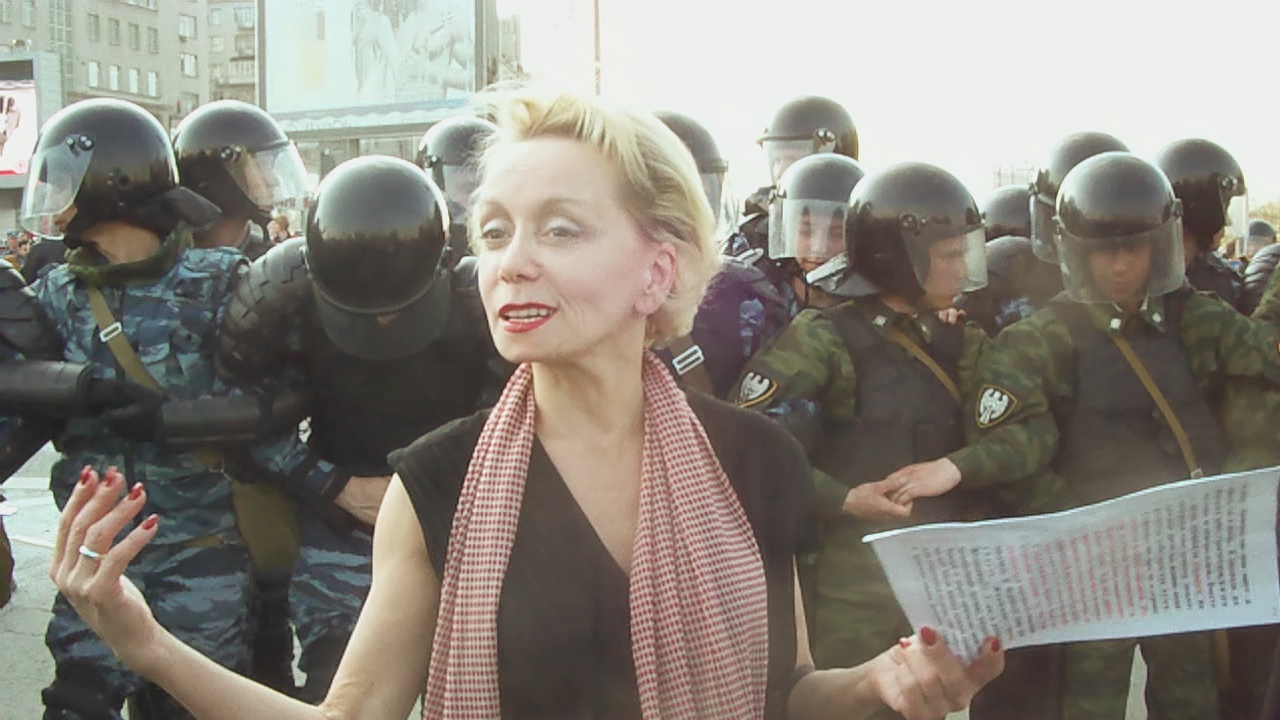
- Germanova in 2012
- Born: Evdokiya Alekseevna Germanova; 8 November 1959 (age 66); Moscow, RSFSR, USSR
- Education: Russian Academy of Theatre Arts (GITIS)
- Occupation: Actress
- Years active: 1975–present
- Family: Lyubov Germanova (sister)
- Awards: Honored Artist of Russia

Evdokiya Alekseevna Germanova (Russian: Евдокия Алексеевна Германова; born 8 November 1959) is a Russian actress, stage director and drama teacher.

== Biography ==
Evdokiya Germanova is the daughter of Aleksey Germanov, a professor of geological sciences, and Galina Dashkevich, a chemist.

== Career ==
- In 1979, in one of the amateur performances, the main director of the Moscow Taganka Theater
- 1981–86 – a student at the actor's faculty in GITIS (Oleg Tabakov and Avangard Leontiev's course), a year later she joins the troupe of the Oleg Tabakov's theater studio.
- Since 2012 she leads the workshop of the Theater Department of the Moscow Institute of Television and Radio "Ostankino" and the Higher School of Cinema and Television "Ostankino".
- In 2016 she was visiting professor at Harvard (Stanislavsky Acting School).
- Since 2017 – manager of department of Theater Arts, Faculty of Theater, Cinema and Television in Moscow Financial and Industrial University.

== Awards ==
- 1986 – All-union Festival for Young Cinematographers: Grand Prix for best actress in the 1985 film We Cannot Predict directed by Olga Narutskaya
- 1991 – Molodist International Film Festival: Audience Prize and Jury Prize for best actress in the 1991 film Niagara directed by Alexander Vizir
- 1992 – Karlovy Vary International Film Festival: Grand Prix The Crystal Globe for best actress in the 1991 film Kiks directed by Sergei Livnev
- 1992 – Constellation /Sozvezdie Film Festival: Prize for best actress in Kiks
- 1994 – Thessaloniki International Film Festival: Special Jury Mention for the film Hammer and Sickle
- 1995 – Honored Artist of Russia
- 2000 – Winner of the International Stanislawski Prize for the role of Nastya in the play based on The Lower Depths by Maxim Gorky
- 2002 – Vera Kholodnaya Prize, for The Most Graceful Actress
- 2005 – Best Female Supporting Role at the Third international festival of military cinema of Yu.Ozerov (Time to Collect Stones, 2005)

=== Theatrical career ===
- Taganka Theater
- Moscow Theatre-Studio Tabakerka
- The Moscow Art Theatre (or MAT)

The Taganka Theater

• 1979 – Rush Hour (Jerzy Stefan Stawiński) – Eva

• 1979 – Romeo and Juliet (William Shakespeare) – Benvolio

• 1980 – House on the Embankment (Yury Trifonov) directed by Yury Lyubimov

Tabakerka

• 1984 – I Nailed (Barrie Keeffe) directed by Oleg Tabakov – Leann

• 1985 – The Skylark (Jean Anouilh) directed by Oleg Tabakov – Joan of Arc

• 1987 – The Chair (Yuri Polyakov) – Milochka

• 1987 – Two Arrows – Tribe people

• 1987 – Ali Baba et al – Fatima, wife of Kasim

• 1987 – Farewell... and applaud (Aleksei Bogdanovich) – Theodora Medebak, actress

• 1987 – Biloxi Blues (Neil Simon) – Daisy

• 1987 – Belief. Love. Hope (Ödön von Horváth) – Elisabeth

• 1988 – Hole (Alexander Galin).The director was Alexander Galin – Pardo

• 1991 – The Government Inspector (Gogol) – Anna Andreevna

• 1995 – Psycho (Alexander Minchin) – Lina Dmitrievna

• 1995 – The Last (Maxim Gorky) – Mrs. Sokolova

• 2000 – One Hundred Yen for the Service (Minoru Betsuyaku). The director was Elena Nevezhina – She

• 2000 – The Lower Depths (Gorky) – Nastyona

• 2000 – Another Van Gogh – Mother

• 2002 – The City (Yevgeni Grishkovetz) – Tatiana

• 2004 – As I Lay Dying (William Faulkner) directed by Mindaugas Karbauskis – Addi Bandren

• 2005 – Bolero (Pavel Kohout) – Hermina

• 2007 – The Process (Kafka) directed by Konstantin Bogomolov – Frau Grubach, director of the Chancery

• 2007 – The Overstocked Barrel (Vasily Aksyonov) – Stepanida Efimovna

• 2017 – Nights of Cabiria (Federico Fellini) – old beggar

The Moscow Art Theatre (or MAT)

• 2004 – The Cherry Orchard (Anton Chekhov) – Charlotte Ivanovna, the governess

• 2006 – Mozart's Last Mistake (Dmitry Minchenok) – Constantius

Entreprise performances

• 1992 – The Title (Italy)

• 1993 – Mystery – a performance in English

• 1994 – Four Whheels in the Flesh (Pyotr Gladilin)

• 1997 – The Dead Monkey directed A. V. Parra

• 1997 – The Swarthy Lady of Sonnets (Bernard Shaw) – Queen Elizabeth

• 1999 – The Athenian Evenings (Pyotr Gladilin) directed by Nikolai Chindyajkin

• 2012 – I am Edmon Dantes (musical) directed by Egor Druzhinin

• 2014 – Faina. The Bird Soaring in a Cage – Lyubov Orlova

• 2014 – The Imagination Game (Emil Braginsky) directed by Vyacheslav Nevinny – Rita

• 2017 – The Arc de Triomphe (Erich Maria Remarque) – Eugenie

• 2018 – The Dance Teacher (Lope de Vega) – Lysena

Director's works

• 2014 – Leap Into Bed. 25th Row Studio

• 2015 – Unholy. 25th Row Studio

• 2016 – Express California. FIT

• 2017 – Wake Yourself. MITRO

== Selected filmography ==
1.1975 – In Anticipation of a Miracle – Sidorkin's daughter

2. 1976 – The Age of Innocence – Vera

3. 1977 – Practical Joke – Dasha Rozanova

4. 1976 – Trainee – Friend of Katya Savelieva

5. 1977 – Return of the Son – Tonja

6. 1977 – Gift of Fate – Weaver

7. 1977 – The Portrait with the Rain – Marina Kulikova

8. 1978 – At the Bottom (short) – Natasha

9. 1979 – Scenes from Family Life – Lille

10. 1980 – Tell Yourself – Nadya Romashkina

11. 1980 – The Strange Holiday

12. 1982 – Stoves – Lelia, wife of Aleksei Trofimovich

13. 1982 – The Wedding Gift – Oksana (a leading role)

14. 1985 – We Are Not Allowed to Foresee... – Tanya Ageeva

15. 1987 – The Armchair – Milochka

16. 1987 – Are We This? – She

17. 1987 – Men's Portraits – Alla Oseneva (theater actress)

18. 1988 – Comment on Petition for Clemency – Red

19. 1988 – New Adventures of a Yankee in King Arthur's Court – Sandy

20. 1988 – Tales of Italy

21. 1988 – Incident in Utinozersk – Albina Vasilievna

22. 1989 – Here it is – freedom! Itt a szabadság! (Hungary) – Dusya

23. 1989 – Marakuta (short)

24. 1989 – Life on the Limit – Svetka

25. 1989 – Crazy – Vera

26. 1991 – The Inner Circle as educator in the orphanage

27. 1991 – Kicks – Jeanne Plavskaya

28. 1991 – Dead Without Burial, or Hunting in the Rat

29. 1991 – Niagara – Larisa

30. 1991 – Staru-ha-rmsa – lady

31. 1991 – Auditor (film-play) – Anna Andreevna, wife of the governor

32. 1992 – Death Macaroni, or Professor Buggensberg's Mistake – Sonka Golden Hand

33. 1993 – The Cherry Orchard – Charlotte

34. 1993 – The Way of Murder (Ukraine) – Virginia Dodge

35. 1994 – Sickle and hammer – Vera Raevskaya

36. 1995 – A Moslem – Verka

37. 1995 – This is Us!

38. 1997 – Swarthy Lady of Sonnets – Queen Elizabeth

39. 1998 – Falling Upwards (Belarus)

40. 2000 – Own Shadow – Rita

41. 2000 – To Be Remembered (documentary)

42. 2001 – Detectives – Daria

43. 2001 – Emigrant, or Beard with Glasses and Warthog – Tuzik

44. 2001 – 2004 – Rostov-daddy (TV Series) – Varvara

45. 2002 – Leading Roles – Russo

46. 2003 – The Barbarian – witch

47. 2003 – Dasha Vasilyeva. The Lover of Private Investigation – Jacqueline

48. 2003 – The Best City of Earth – Chusova

49. 2003 – Present Me Life – Natasha, Olga's mother

50. 2003 – Church under Birches – Tamara Sugrobova, "Lyubov Orlova"

51. 2004 – My Big Armenian Wedding – Lille

52. 2004 – It's Russian – Raisa Fiodorovna, Ed's mother

53. 2004 – Narrow Bridge – episode

54. 2004 – 2005 – Be Careful, Zadov! (sketch comedy) – sister

55. 2004 – Last (film-play)

56. 2005 – A Time to Gather Stones – Nyura

57. 2005 – Psycho (film-play) – Lina Dmitrievna, the doctor-murderer

58. 2006 – Hunter – Valentina, a witch in the past / employee of the editorial office

59. 2006 – The Color of the Sky – A woman with a pin

60. 2007 – Vanechka – director of the child's home

61. 2007 – Branch of Lilac – Satina

62. 2007 – 2009 – The Fire of Love (TV Series) – Claudia / Aunt Katya

63. 2008 – Both shines, and heats (the director's term paper of Olga Kormukhina)

64. 2008 – The Girl – Irina Vadimovna Yartseva

65. 2008 – Heritage – Valentina Semyonovna

66. 2008 – New Year's Family (Ukraine) – Natalia Stepanovna Stargorodskaya

67. 2008 – Practical Joke – Taya's mother

68. 2009 – Barvikha – Jeanette, the cleaner

69. 2009 – Jurov – Amalia Berulava, circus performer

70. 2009 – The Forty – third issue is Andrei's mother

71. 2009 – Roof – Nyura

72. 2010 – The Hen Night – Albina Matveevna

73. 2010 – The House of the Sun – the head of tourist group

74. 2010 – To Marry the Millionaire! – Klara Stepanovna, Semyon's mother

75. 2010 – Oleg Tabakov. Lighting stars (documentary)

76. 2010 – At Everyone the Rar – aunt of Katya Gavrocheva's mother

77. 2010 – Death in eye-glasses, or Our Chekhov – Charlotte

78. 2010 – Flowers from Lisa – Margarita Nikolaevna

79. 2010 – Once Upon a Time There Lived a Simple Woman – Feklusha

80. 2011 – For Life – Lusia

81. 2012 – Crime by Succession – Rina's mother Pavel

82. 2012 – Petrovich – Raisa Stepanovna Nikitina / Tamara Stepanovna Nikitina

83. 2012 – The Cherry Orchard (film-play) – Charlotte Ivanovna, governess

84. 2013 – Sex, coffee, cigarettes – Flora Varfolomeevna, professor

85. 2013 – Two Winters and Three Summers – Sophia

86. 2015 – Lady Disappears at Midnight – Renata Nemirovskaya / Gennady's girlfriend

87. 2017 – Anna Karenina: Vronsky's Story – Countess Kartasova

88. 2023 – Here's to You and Us! – Evstolya Dmitrievna
