= Valery Ryzhakov =

Russian actor (1945–2015)

- Валерий Рыжаков
- Ryzhakov in 1985
- Born: Valery Nikolayevich Ryzhakov; December 23, 1945; Moscow, RSFSR, USSR
- Died: December 31, 2015 (aged 70); Moscow, Russia
- Occupation: actor
- Years active: 1968–1992

Valery Nikolayevich Ryzhakov (Russian: Вале́рий Никола́евич Рыжако́в; 23 December 1945 – 31 December 2015) was a Soviet and Russian film and theater actor, Honored Artist of the RSFSR (1984), winner of the USSR State Prize (1980).

== Biography ==
In 1967 Ryzhakov he graduated from the VGIK (Vladimir Belokurov course). From 1968 to 1970, he served as an actor troupe Russian Army Theatre. From 1970 to 1992, actor Gorky Film Studio. He became widely known for his role as Nikolai Petrovich from the cult of the military action movie by director Yaropolk Lapshin Before Dawn (1989).

In the early 1990s he has left an acting career and became an entrepreneur, successfully engaged in publishing. But financial failure and betrayal associates forced him to stop work. Went to religion. Together with his wife he served in the Church of the Trinity in the Trinity-Golenishchevo.

Valery Ryzhakov died December 31, 2015, in Moscow. He was buried at the Vostryakovskoye Cemetery.

== Partial filmography ==
- Chronicle of Flaming Years (1961) as schoolboy
- My Friend, Kolka! (1961) as schoolboy
- Whistle Stop (1963) as Vasya, driver
- Commissar (1966) as cadet
- Officers (1971) as Captain Yury Sergeyev
- I Loved You (1968) as Zhora
- The Return of Saint Luke' (1971) as Sergei
- Officers (1971) as Yuriy Sergeyev
- Telegram (1972) as drug Gleba
- Sea Cadet of Northern Fleet (1974) as leytenant Novikov
- Yurka's Sunrises (1974, TV Mini-Series) as Yuri
- The Casket of Maria Medici (1981) as Vladimir Lyusin, police captain
- Express on Fire (1981) as stowaway passenger
- Before Sunrise (1989) as Nikolai Petrovich

== Awards ==
- USSR State Prize (1980)
- Honored Artist of the RSFSR (1984)
