= Sergiyevy-Gorki =

Sergiyevy-Gorki Сергиевы-Горки
- Selo
- Location within Vladimir Oblast Location within Russia
- Coordinates: 55°58′N 42°06′E
- Country: Russia
- Region: Vladimir Oblast
- District: Vyaznikovsky District
- Time zone: UTC+3:00

Sergiyevy-Gorki (Russian: Сергиевы-Горки) is a rural locality (a selo) in Paustovskoye Rural Settlement, Vyaznikovsky District, Vladimir Oblast, Russia. The population was 462 as of 2010. There are 7 streets.

== Geography ==
Sergiyevy-Gorki is located on the Indrus River, 36 km south of Vyazniki (the district's administrative centre) by road. Prigorevo is the nearest rural locality.
