= Pub "13 Chairs" =

Soviet TV program (1966–1980)

- Genre: Comedy, Satire
- Created by: Georgy Zelinsky
- Written by: Rustem Gubaydullin; Alla Radzinskaya; Anatoly Koreshkov
- Directed by: Georgy Zelinsky; Sergey Evlakhishvili; Roman Viktyuk; Mark Zakharov; Spartak Mishulin; Nadezhda Marusalova; Lidia Ishimbaeva; Alina Kazmina
- Starring: Olga Aroseva; Viktor Baykov; Aleksandr Belyavsky; Yuri Volyntsev; Zinovy Vysokovsky; Mikhail Derzhavin; Zoya Zelinskaya; Vladimir Kozel; Viktoria Lepko; Spartak Mishulin; Rudolf Rudin; Boris Runge; Natalya Seleznyova; Yuri Sokovnin; Roman Tkachuk; Valentina Sharykina; Georgy Vitsin; Evgeny Kuznetsov and others
- Composers: Artur Zargaryan; Anatoly Bykanov
- Country of origin: Soviet Union
- Original language: Russian
- No. of seasons: 14
- No. of episodes: 133

Production
- Cinematography: Lev Streltsin; Tom Patterson; Marat Larin; Dmitry Serebryakov; Valery Kostin
- Running time: 50–70 minutes

Original release
- Network: Soviet Central Television
- Release: 16 January 1966 – 4 October 1980

Pub "13 Chairs" (Russian: Кабачок «13 стульев») was a variety entertainment and comedy television program produced by Soviet Central Television. It aired from 16 January 1966 to 4 October 1980.

The show was set in a studio designed to resemble a Polish pub. Its characters performed sketches, monologues, and musical numbers, often adapted from humor magazines from the Eastern Bloc countries such as Poland's Szpilki, Hungary's Ludas Matyi, Bulgaria's Starshel, East Germany's Eulenspiegel, and the Soviet Union's Krokodil.

The main roles of the café’s patrons were primarily played by actors from the Moscow Satire Theatre. The program's chief director was Georgy Zelinsky. Over 15 years, a total of 133 episodes were produced. The show ended in 1980 following the political crisis in Poland.

All characters refer to each other with Polish forms of polite address: "pan/pani", meaning "mister/mistress".

== Premise ==
The series features a quirky group of regulars: employees of a fictional trust, along with their relatives and friends. The trust is involved in various odd ventures, including the production of musical washbasins and shoe repairs. It also includes a children's toy factory, where Pan Gimalaisky orders dolls for his animated series Spaniel Tyopa and Bulldog Tyapa. The trust runs a fashion house where Pani Karolinka forecasts trends, a theater where Pan Gimalaisky works, and a circus where he once brought a camel. It also has an orchestra led by Pan Pepusevich, a sports club featuring Pan Sportsman, and a school where Pan Professor briefly taught physics. The management of the trust is overseen by Pan Director, who has a superior, Pan Manager, and is supported by the accountant Pan Votruba (slightly corrupted Polish 'wątroba'), who served under both directors. Pan Director also has a secretary for extra-trust matters, Pani Eva.

Throughout the series, Pan Director's personal life provides comedic material. He was once set to marry Pani Lucina, later considered marrying the headstrong Pani Elżbieta, and almost wed Pani Eva, the niece of Pani Monika. Both Pani Lucina and Pani Elżbieta successfully placed their relatives in positions within the trust. Another key character, Pan Zyuzya, is a part-time amateur writer who initially wrote poetry but later delved into novels and plays. In one episode, he composes a poem for Pan Director's 100th pub meeting, with Pan Votruba as his muse. He also discusses his novel's characters with literary critic Pan Tsypa.

Some characters are not from the trust. Pan Professor, a former economics doctor and physics teacher at the school, speaks English and reminisces about his youth with Pani Monika. The two recall that the area where the pub now stands was once a student cafeteria, and he confesses his past love for her. Pan Professor is said to live or work in Gdansk, adding an air of mystery. Pani Monika's husband, Pan Bonifacy, was the best at the 400-meter dash in school and is described as her ideal man, a combination of Prince Poniatowski and Hemingway. They have a daughter, Pani Olgitsa, and a niece, Pani Eva, who also plays a part in the comedic antics at the pub.
