= Sulambek Mamilov =

Russian film director (1938–2023)

- Born: Sulambek Akhmetovitj Mamilov; 27 August 1938; Ordzhonikidze, North Ossetian ASSR, Russian SFSR, USSR
- Died: 12 January 2023 (aged 84); Moscow, Russia
- Occupations: Film director, screenwriter, actor
- Years active: 1962–2006
- Notable work: Ladies' Tango (1983); Day of Wrath (1985)
- Awards: Russian Federation Presidential Certificate of Honour (2019)

Sulambek Mamilov (Russian: Суламбе́к Ахме́тович Мами́лов; 27 August 1938 – 13 January 2023) was a Soviet and Russian film director, screenwriter and actor.

== Biography ==
Mamilov was born on 27 August 1938 in Ordzhonikidze, present-day Vladikavkaz, Soviet Union.

In 1957–1959 he studied at the history department of the Grozny Pedagogical Institute, then transferred to the acting department of the Russian State Institute of Performing Arts, from which he graduated in 1962. After, Mamilov was an actor of the Kh. Nuradilov Grozny Drama Theater. In 1970, he graduated from High Courses for Scriptwriters and Film Directors (studied at the workshops of Marlen Khutsiev, Aleksandr Alov and Vladimir Naumov).

Mamilov died in Moscow on 12 January 2023, at the age of 84.

== Selected filmography ==
=== Actor ===
- Hero of Our Time (Герой нашего времени, 1966)

=== Film director ===
- Ladies' Tango (Дамское танго, 1983)
- Day of Wrath (День гнева, 1985)
- Children of the Storm (Ночевала тучка золотая..., 1990)
- The Murder at Zhdanovskaya (Убийство на «Ждановской», 1992)

== External references ==
- Sulambek Mamilov at IMDb
- Биография на сайте гильдии Кинорежиссёров России.
- Мамилов Суламбек Ахметович.
- Интервью С.А. Мамилова порталу "Это Кавказ"
