= Presence (1993 film) =

- Russian: Присутствие
- Directed by: Andrey Dobrovolskiy
- Written by: Yuri Arabov
- Starring: Aleksey Petrenko; Aleksandra Butorina; Aleksandr Adabashyan; Olga Antonova; Lidiya Savchenko
- Cinematography: Yuriy Rayskiy
- Edited by: Valeriya Belova
- Music by: Alfred Schnittke
- Production company: Paritet Film Studio
- Release date: 1993
- Running time: 97 min.
- Country: Russia
- Language: Russian

Presence (Russian: Присутствие, romanized: Prisutstvie) is a 1993 Russian drama film directed by Andrey Dobrovolskiy.

== Plot ==
The film tells about a lonely man who has only memories of his beloved woman, which cannot be returned. Or is it still possible?

== Cast ==
- Aleksey Petrenko as Petya
- Aleksandra Butorina as Liza, a girl
- Aleksandr Adabashyan as Nikolai
- Olga Antonova as Natalia
- Lidiya Savchenko as the woman on the bench
- Vadim Gems as port worker
- Konstantin Vorobyov as port worker
- Konstantin Berdikov as port worker
- Afanasi Trishkin as port worker
- Leonid Filatkin as port worker
