= Arkady Inin =

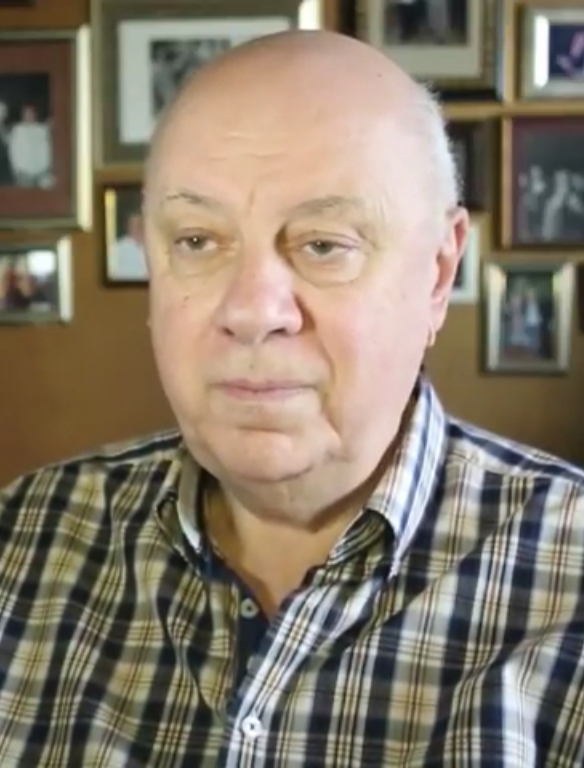
- Born: Arkady Yakovlevich Gurevich; 3 May 1938 (age 87); Kharkiv (Ukrainian Soviet Socialist Republic, Soviet Union)
- Occupation(s): writer-satirist, screenwriter, humorist
- Spouse: Inna Ivanova
- Children: 2

Arkady Yakovlevich Inin (Russian: Арка́дий Я́ковлевич И́нин), original surname Gurevich (Russian: Гуревич); born 3 May 1938, Kharkov) is a Soviet and Russian writer, playwright, screenwriter, actor, publicist, teacher and professor.

== Biography ==
He was born on 3 May 1938 in Kharkov, into the family of Yakov Noevich and Sara Abramovna Gurevich. He graduated from the Kharkiv Polytechnic Institute.

Carried away by the stage, he participated in the skits, in the games of KVN and, having worked as an engineer for eight years, entered the VGIK at the faculty of film dramaturgy.

The nickname (then the official name) Inin took in honor of his wife Inna, who died in March 2021 after 60 years of marriage.

== Work ==
The author of forty comedies (Once Upon a Time Twenty Years Later, Yeralash, Offered for Singles, Private Detective, or Operation Cooperation, Weather Is Good on Deribasovskaya, It Rains Again on Brighton Beach), thirty books of humor, more than two hundred television and radio programs. Professor of VGIK. He was awarded the Order of Friendship (1998) and the Order of Honour (2009).

He advocated the ban of Moscow Pride in Russia.
