= Svetlana Druzhinina =

Russian actress and filmmaker (born 1935)

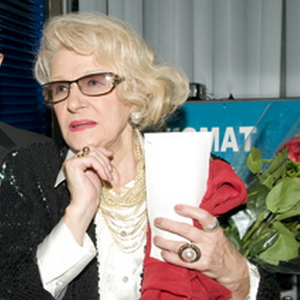
- Svetlana Druzhinina (2009)
- Born: Svetlana Sergeyevna Druzhinina; 16 December 1935 (age 90); Moscow, Soviet Union
- Education: Stanislavski and Nemirovich-Danchenko Theatre; Bolshoi Ballet Academy, VGIK
- Occupations: Actress, Director, Screenwriter, Film producer
- Title: People's Artist of Russia
- Spouse: Anatolij Mukasej
- Children: Anatolij Mukasej (died in 1988), Mihail Mukasej
- Awards: Order "For Merit in Culture and Art"; Order of Honour; Order of Friendship; Honoured Worker of the Arts Industry of the RSFSR; Presidential Letter of Gratitude

Svetlana Sergeyevna Druzhinina (Russian: Светла́на Серге́евна Дружи́нина; born 16 December 1935 in Moscow) is a Soviet and Russian actress, film director, screenwriter and film producer. She is best known for directing the Gardes-Marines trilogy consisting of Gardes-Marines, Forward!, Viva Gardes-Marines! and Gardes-Marines III.

== Biography ==
Svetlana Druzhinina was born on 16 December 1935 in Moscow. In 1946, Druzhinina entered the circus school, where she successfully worked with a group of circus acrobats for one year. A year later she moved to the ballet school at the Stanislavski and Nemirovich-Danchenko Moscow Academic Music Theatre. In 1955 she graduated from the ballet school of the Bolshoi Theatre, where she studied together with future ballet stars Māris Liepa and Natalya Kasatkina. Because of a serious injury Druzhinina couldn’t become a dancer.

In 1955 Druzhinina debuted as an actress in the movie Showcase for Supermarket (Russian: "За витриной универмага"), played a shop assistant Sonja Bozhko. From 1955 to 1965 she was an actress at the central studio of Gorky Film Studio.

In 1960 Druzhinina graduated from the VGIK Faculty of Actor (actor's workshop of Olga Pyzhova and Boris Bibikov).

In 1969 Druzhinina graduated from the VGIK Faculty of Director (workshop of Igor Talankin), her thesis film was Zinka (screenwriter B. Mazhaev). In the same year she began working as a director with Mosfilm. During her training, in 1968, she would become the very first director to film a scene from the novel The Master and Margarita by writer Mikhail Bulgakov.

Druzhinina was a hostess of the first Soviet humor TV shows and competitions called KVN on the Central Television (together with Mikhail Derzhavin).

Her debut as a director was in the movie called Fulfillment of Desires (Russian: "Исполнение желаний") (1974) based on the novel by Veniamin Kaverin.

Druzhinina received her recognition and national love as a director in 1987 after the release of the TV film Gardes-Marines, Forward!. This was her first experience as a director of a historical movie, and it was very successful. Later the history of the Russian Empire became the main theme of her work.

From 2000 to the present time Druzhinina is directing a TV series about the history of Russia in the 18th century called Secrets of Palace coup d'etat. Russia, 18th century.

== Family ==
Mother - Anna Danilovna Myznikova, the Don Cossack, worked as a teacher in kindergarten. Father - Sergei Ivanovich Druginyn, son of a priest, the driver (died during the Great Patriotic War).

Husband - Anatoly Mukasei (born 26 July 1938), Soviet and Russian filmmaker, People's Artist of the Russian Federation (2009). In 2013, the couple celebrated the 55th anniversary of marriage.

- The eldest son - Anatoly Mukasey, died in 1988.
  - grandson - Daniil (born 24 February 1987), engaged in computer editing movies.
- The youngest son - Michael Mukasey (born 3 January 1966), the Russian filmmaker and film producer.
  - grandson - Maxim, granddaughter - Elizabeth
- Third daughter-in-law - Yekaterina Gamova (born 17 October 1980), the Russian volleyball player of the national team, twice world champion, Merited Master of Sports of Russia. Michael and Yekaterina were married on 17 August 2012.

== Filmography ==
=== Director, screenwriter and producer ===
Year	Film	Russian Title	
1969	Zinka	Зинка	Director (Thesis)
1974	Fulfillment of Desires	Исполнение желаний	Director
1977	The Sun, the Sun Again	Солнце, снова солнце	Director, Screenwriter
1979	Matchmaking Hussar	Сватовство гусара	Director, Screenwriter
1980	Dulcinea del Toboso	Дульсинея Тобосская	Director
1982	The Circus Princess	Принцесса цирка	Director, Screenwriter
1988	Gardes-Marines, Forward!	Гардемарины, вперёд!	Director, Screenwriter
1991	Viva Gardes-Marines!	Виват, гардемарины!	Director, Screenwriter
1992	Gardes-Marines III	Гардемарины III	Director, Screenwriter
2000	Secrets of Palace coup d'etat. Russia, 18th century. Film №1. Testament Emperor	Тайны дворцовых переворотов. Россия, век XVIII-ый. Фильм 1-й. Завещание императора	Director, Screenwriter
2000	Secrets of Palace coup d'etat. Russia, 18th century. Film №2. Testament Empress	Тайны дворцовых переворотов. Россия, век XVIII-ый. Фильм 2-й. Завещание императрицы	Director, Screenwriter
2001	Secrets of Palace coup d'etat. Russia, 18th century. Film №3. I am the Emperor	Тайны дворцовых переворотов. Россия, век XVIII-ый. Фильм 3-й. Я - император	Director, Screenwriter
2001	Secrets of Palace coup d'etat. Russia, 18th century. Film №4. Overthrow Goliath	Тайны дворцовых переворотов. Россия, век XVIII-ый. Фильм 4-й. Падение Голиафа	Director, Screenwriter
2003	Secrets of Palace coup d'etat. Russia, 18th century. Film №5. Second Bride Emperor	Тайны дворцовых переворотов. Россия, век XVIII-ый. Фильм 5-й. Вторая невеста императора	Director, Screenwriter
2003	Secrets of Palace coup d'etat. Russia, 18th century. Film №6. The death of the young emperor	Тайны дворцовых переворотов. Россия, век XVIII-ый. Фильм 6-й. Смерть юного императора	Director, Screenwriter
2008	Secrets of Palace coup d'etat. Russia, 18th century. Film №7. Viva, Anna!	Тайны дворцовых переворотов. Россия, век XVIII-ый. Фильм 7-й. Виват, Анна!	Director, Screenwriter, Film producer
2011	Secrets of Palace coup d'etat. Russia, 18th century. Film №8. Part 1. Hunting for a princess	Тайны дворцовых переворотов. Россия, век XVIII-ый. Фильм 8-й, часть 1. Охота на принцессу	Director, Screenwriter
2013	Secrets of Palace coup d'etat. Russia, 18th century. Film №8. Part 1. Hunting for a princess	Тайны дворцовых переворотов. Россия, век XVIII-ый. Фильм 8-й, часть 2. Охота на принцессу	Director, Screenwriter
2019	Gardes-Marines IV	Гардемарины IV	Director

=== Actor ===
Year	Film	Russian Title	Role
1955	Behind Show Windows	За витриной универмага	Sonja Bozhko
1955	Good Morning	Доброе утро	belle of the ball (uncredited)
1956	Herdsman song	Песнь табунщика	girl in a conservatory
1957	It Happened in Penkovo	Дело было в Пеньково	Larissa
1960	The bridge can not move	Мост перейти нельзя	(the character's name is not specified)
1960	Bad omen	Плохая примета	Klava
1961	The Girls	Девчата	Anfisa
1961	Eagle island	Орлиный остров	Irina Rodova, archaeologist
1962	On Seven Winds	На семи ветрах	Tonya Baykova
1962	Somewhere a son	Где-то есть сын	Nadia
1963	Monday is a hard day	Понедельник день тяжелый	Udaltsova
1963	Collecting clouds	Собирающий облака	teacher
1964	What is the sea?	Какое оно, море?	(the character's name is not specified)
1964	Green light	Зелёный огонёк	(the character's name is not specified)
1964	Fifth poplar	Пятый тополь	(the character's name is not specified)
1965	Beloved	Любимая	Sophia
1965	Loneliness	Одиночество	Maria Kosova
1970	Heart of Russia	Сердце России	Olga Nikolaevna

== Awards and honours ==
- Honoured Worker of the Arts Industry of the RSFSR (14 December 1989)
- People's Artist of Russia (1 November 2001)
- Order of Honour (3 April 2006)
- Order of Friendship (9 January 2012)
- Order "For Merit in Culture and Art" (14 March 2024)
