= Olga Antonova (actress) =

Soviet actress

- Born: Olga Sergeyevna Antonova; 22 December 1937 (age 88); Leningrad, RSFSR, Soviet Union
- Occupation: Actress
- Years active: 1965—2015

Olga Sergeyevna Antonova (Russian: О́льга Серге́евна Анто́нова; born December 22, 1937) is a Soviet and Russian film and stage actress. People's Artist of Russia (1994).

== Selected filmography ==
- An Almost Funny Story (1977) as Illaria Pavlovna
- The Asthenic Syndrome (1989) as Natalia Ivanovna
- The Assassin of the Tsar (1991) as Empress Alexandra
- Presence (1992) as Natalia
- The Castle (1994) as Innkeeper
- The Captain's Daughter (2000) as Catherine the Great
- Streets of Broken Lights (2004) as Zoya Ivleva
