= The Murder at Zhdanovskaya =

- Russian: Убийство на «Ждановской»
- Directed by: Sulambek Mamilov
- Written by: Vladimir Kalinichenko; Ivan Loshchilin
- Produced by: Vladimir Chudovsky; Sergey Sendyk
- Starring: Ivan Bortnik; Vadim Zakharchenko; Boris Novikov; Vladimir Ivashov; Viktor Anisimov
- Cinematography: Vyacheslav Zvonilkin
- Music by: Viktor Rafaelov
- Release date: 1992
- Country: Russia
- Language: Russian

The Murder at Zhdanovskaya (Russian: Убийство на «Ждановской») is a 1992 Russian crime film directed by Sulambek Mamilov. The film is a fictionalization of the 1980 Zhdanovskaya murder incident.

== Plot ==
The film takes place in 1980. It tells about an investigation into the mugging and murder-kidnapping of a KGB man by MVD thugs at Zhdanovskaya Station. Because of the impunity enjoyed by members of the Soviet secret services, robbery of passengers on the Soviet railway system by MVD agents was widespread.

== Cast ==
- Ivan Bortnik as Gleb Yarin
- Vadim Zakharchenko as Andropov
- Boris Novikov as Mitrich
- Vladimir Ivashov as Viktor Vasilievitch
- Viktor Anisimov
- Anatoli Borodin as Tsykin
- Viktor Chervyakov as Tsykin
- Anton Golyshev as Andrei Sviyagin
- Natalya Goncharova
- Sergey Grekov
- Anatoliy Ivanov
