= Weather Is Good on Deribasovskaya, It Rains Again on Brighton Beach =

Weather Is Good on Deribasovskaya, or It Rains Again on Brighton Beach
- Directed by: Leonid Gaidai
- Written by: Arkady Inin; Leonid Gaidai; Yuri Volovich
- Starring: Dmitry Kharatyan; Kelly McGrill; Andrey Myagkov; Armen Dzhigarkhanyan; Mamuka Kikaleishvili; Leonid Kuravlyov; Spartak Mishulin
- Cinematography: Vadim Alisov
- Music by: Aleksandr Zatsepin; Viktor Babushkin
- Distributed by: Mosfilm
- Release date: 1992
- Running time: 97 min
- Countries: Russia; United States
- Language: Russian / English

Weather Is Good on Deribasovskaya, or It Rains Again on Brighton Beach (Russian: На Дерибасовской хорошая погода, или На Брайтон-Бич опять идут дожди, romanized: Na Deribasovskoy khoroshaya pogoda, ili Na Brayton-Bich opyat idut dozhdi) is a 1992 joint Russian–American production comedy film directed by Leonid Gaidai as his last film. Its title used in the plot as a password for secret agents and refers to Derybasivska Street and Brighton Beach.

== Plot ==
The action takes place in the last years of the existence of the USSR. The Cold War is over, the presidents of the two great powers – the USSR and the United States – must meet for important negotiations. However, the meeting is in jeopardy due to the rampant Russian mafia, which has settled in the United States (mafioso Rabinovich suddenly intervenes in the conversation of the presidents on a top-secret telephone line and disconnects them in order to urgently call the "humor capital of the USSR", Odesa).

In a Russian sauna, the working groups of the KGB and the CIA meet and celebrate the beginning of cooperation. In the meantime, CIA officers tell their KGB colleagues about the rampant Russian mafia in the United States. They know the leader of the mafia, who transforms into Hitler, Napoleon, Peter the Great, Saddam Hussein, Othello and other characters, but no one has seen his real face. The KGB general is surprised and calls him an artist, to which the CIA general replies that this is his real nickname – "Artist".

To help his American colleagues eliminate the Russian mafia, the KGB general decides to send a super agent Fyodor Sokolov from Odesa to New York. Having received an order to urgently fly to Moscow, Sokolov was forced to fly from Odesa and land on Red Square on a Yak-55 sports plane, since the air traffic controllers had a strike that day (an allusion to the scandalous flight of Mathias Rust), the railway is blocked by "extremists", a petroleum worker strike has blocked fuel supplies to the automotive sector and the KGB's torpedo boat "Iron Felix" has been rented by a business for a cruise around the Black Sea.

Arriving in the United States, Sokolov finds the "Langeron" restaurant, a famous gathering place for the Russian mafia in New York City, where he accidentally meets a certain Uncle Misha, who tells the KGB agent about the restaurant's visitors and introduces them as members of the Russian mafia, although they really are not. At the end of the evening, the local singer, Mary Star, performs in the restaurant and charms Sokolov.

The next day, the KGB agent has an appointment with the CIA agent. He goes to the radio operator, Monya, but the paper with the password has been eaten by his grandson. Sokolov goes to a cafe, where Mary Star joins him. In order not to fail the assignment, Sokolov, remembering the words of his teacher colonel Petrenko that "an agent must ignore a beautiful woman", is trying to do so. From the radio operator, Sokolov learns that the meeting with the CIA agent should take place in the same cafe and at the same third table at which he and the singer were sitting. There, in the instructions, it was said that the agent must give the password: "The weather is good on Deribasovskaya", to which Sokolov should have answered: "It rains again on Brighton Beach". The CIA agent turns out to be the same singer from the restaurant. She is responsible for ensuring the safety of Sokolov, he leads her to his room, in which she tells him about all the secret devices installed there.

Sokolov travels to Brighton Beach and accidentally meets Uncle Misha, who provides a note addressed to him after he finds it inside a broken-up sausage. Mafiosi offer Fyodor to meet at the Golden Duke casino, which belongs to the Russian mafia. Its director, one of "Artist's" people, offers the agent to return to the USSR for money. Sokolov is again helped by the methods of colonel Petrenko – he devastates the casino, as a result of which the mafiosi are forced to shoot themselves. Sokolov goes to a restaurant with Uncle Misha, who was shot with a suction-cup arrow with a note: "The Artist will be waiting at 18:00 on the pier." But another plan of the mafia to get rid of him fails: this time Sokolov is saved by Mary Star. Artist, in the image of Nikita Khrushchev, scolds Kravchuk, his Ukrainian right-hand man, at the lair for another failure, with Kravchuk barely surviving a fire.

The next day, an Arab sheikh comes to the city. The Russian mafia plans to kidnap him and demand a ransom of a billion dollars. Mary kidnaps the sheikh and disguises him as Sokolov. After Sokolov, disguised as a sheikh, goes to bed, the mafioso Kravchuk breaks the glass ceiling in the bedroom, lifts the bed with the sheikh-Sokolov in a helicopter and takes him to the mafia's lair, which, trying to find out from him the whereabouts of the sheikh, begins to torture him. They try to drown the KGB agent in vain, but he drinks all the water and then regurgitates it back, dousing Kravchuk; tortured with a hot iron, but the iron does not leave burns, and Kravchuk gets burned. In the end, he is thrown into the basement, then Uncle Misha is brought there, who had shouted to the whole restaurant the day before that Fyodor Sokolov was his best friend. He begs the agent to inform the mafia where the sheikh is, scaring him that the mafia has already captured and tortured Mary. At this time, a woman's scream is heard behind the wall, and Sokolov, thinking that it is Mary, begins to knock on the locked door. Then came Kravchuk, and Fyodor said to him that he was ready to give the sheikh to Artist. He understands this literally and, to Sokolov's surprise, addresses this to Uncle Misha, thereby revealing him. Then Sokolov is shackled and walled up in the wall. Suddenly, Mary drives into the building on a motorcycle and saves Sokolov. Mafiosi set off in pursuit, using a tank and toxic substances, but despite this, Mary and Sokolov escape, and the generals who followed them catch the criminals. The Russian mafia in the USA has been defeated.

The presidents of the USSR and the USA again agree on the phone about the planned meeting in Hawaii, but Rabinovich "from the Russian mafia" again interferes in their conversation and again disconnects them.

== Cast ==
- Dmitry Kharatyan as Fyodor Sokolov, KGB agent / sheikh (sheikh was voiced by Dmitry Polonsky)
- Kelly McGrill as Mary Star, CIA agent (voiced by Natalya Varley, vocals by Marina Zhuravlyova)
- Andrey Myagkov as russian emigrant uncle Misha, he is also the Artist, the leader of the Russian mafia ("Stalin" was voiced by Artyom Karapetyan, "Brezhnev" was voiced by Alexander Belyavsky)
- Mikhail Kokshenov as Ukrainian mafioso Kravchuk, the Artist's right-hand man
- Yuri Volyntsev as Stepan, KGB General
- Emmanuil Vitorgan as Jack, CIA general
- Armen Dzhigarkhanyan as Katz, jewish mafioso
- Mamuka Kikaleishvili as Lavrenti Tsuladze, Georgian mafia boss and casino owner
- Yevgeni Vesnik as radio operator Monya
- Natalya Krachkovskaya as Monya's Wife
- Aleksandr Loye as Syoma, Monya's Grandson
- Leonid Kuravlyov as Mikhail Gorbachev, President of the USSR (voiced by Mikhail Grushevsky)
- Vladimir Sedov as George H. W. Bush, President of the United States (voiced by Artyom Karapetyan)
- Spartak Mishulin as Eunuch
- Kelly McGillis as Marriott Manager
- Nikolay Parfyonov as Colonel Petrenko, Head of the Odesa city Militsiya Department
- Ruslan Akhmetov as Nasrullayev, Uzbek mafioso
- Vladimir Ferapontov as Codreanu, Moldovan mafioso
- Vladimir Episcoposyan as Armenian mafioso from the casino
- Arkady Inin as doorman at Casino
- Mentai Utepbergenov as Kazakh mafioso
- Pavel Vinnik as Samson Semyonovich, an emigrant in a restaurant / mafioso Rabinovich (voice over a top-secret telephone line)
- Vera Ivleva is a saleswoman in a store for Russian immigrants
- Serafim Strelkov as captain Kamikazev
- Nikolai Bandurin as Dynin, KGB Colonel
- Mikhail Vashukov as Korablyov, KGB Colonel
- Yuri Vorobyov as Semyonov, KGB Colonel
- Alexander Ryzhkov as Jack's bodyguard
- Sergey Rubeko as 1st CIA officer
- Samson Nzeribe as 2nd CIA officer
- Gustav Kwami Unsa as 3rd CIA officer
- Vyacheslav Razbegayev as an Odesa maniac disguised as a policeman (voiced by Dmitry Matveyev)
- Pavel Smeyan as a street singer on the Arbat
- Pavel Komarov as Tsyganyonok, KGB lieutenant and thimblerigger on the Arbat
- Leonid Gaidai as mad casino gamer (uncredited)
- Nina Grebeshkova as a passerby on Brighton Beach (uncredited)

== Facts ==
The film's casino scenes were filmed at the Trump Taj Mahal Casino Resort (now the Hard Rock Hotel & Casino Atlantic City).
