= Behind Show Windows =

1955 film by Samson Samsonov

- Russian: За витриной универмага
- Directed by: Samson Samsonov
- Written by: Aleksei Kapler
- Starring: Oleg Anofriev; Georgiy Georgiou; Anatoly Kuznetsov; Ivan Dmitriev; Mikaela Drozdovskaya; Svetlana Druzhinina
- Narrated by: Zinovy Gerdt
- Cinematography: Fyodor Dobronravov; Vladimir Monakhov
- Edited by: Esther Tobak
- Music by: Grigori Frid
- Production company: Mosfilm
- Release date: 1955
- Running time: 88 min.
- Country: Soviet Union
- Language: Russian

Behind Show Windows (Russian: За витриной универмага, romanized: Za vitrinoy univermaga) is a 1955 Soviet comedy film directed by Samson Samsonov.

== Plot ==
The head of the finished dress section, Mikhail Krylov, does not get along with the director of the garment factory, Anna Andreevna. He does not like tailoring products. But the situation changes drastically when some crooks try to harm Mikhail and Anna decides to help him.

== Starring ==
- Oleg Anofriev as Slava Sidorkin
- Georgiy Georgiou as Maslov
- Olga Bgan as shopper
- Ivan Dmitriev as Mikhail Ivanovich Krylov
- Mikaela Drozdovskaya as Yulya Petrova
- Svetlana Druzhinina as Sonya Bozhko
- Boris Tenin as Yegor Bozhko
- Anatoly Kuznetsov as Lieutenant Malyutkin
- Nadezhda Medvedeva as Anna Andreevna
- Valentina Leontyeva as cameo
