= Anatoly Mukasei =

Soviet and Russian cinematographer (born 1938)

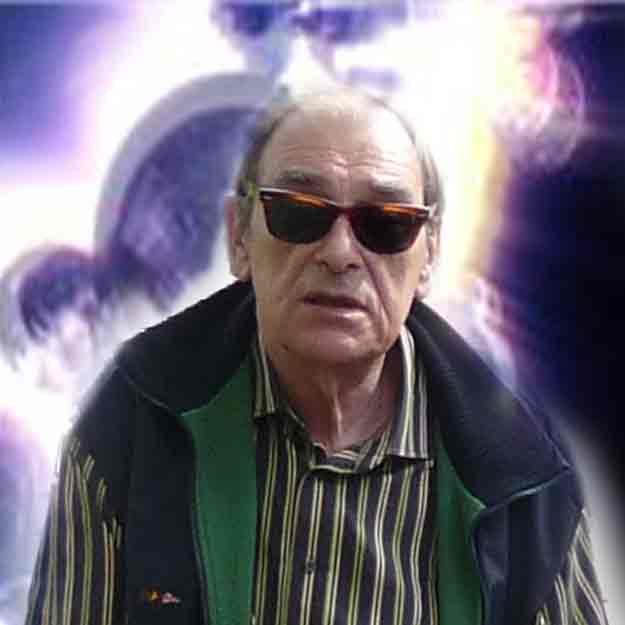
- Anatoly Mukasei, 2009
- Born: July 26, 1938 (age 87); Leningrad, Soviet Union
- Occupation: cinematographer
- Years active: 1964 — present

Anatoly Mikhailovich Mukasei (Russian: Анато́лий Миха́йлович Мукасе́й; born July 26, 1938, Leningrad, RSFSR, USSR) is a Soviet and Russian cinematographer.

Anatoly Mukasei graduated from the Gerasimov Institute of Cinematography in 1961 and worked with many famous Soviet and Russian directors, including Eldar Ryazanov, Rolan Bykov, Daniil Khrabrovitsky.

Winner of USSR State Prize (1986). People's Artist of Russia (2009).

Anatoly Mukasei is a member of the Russian Academy of Motion Picture Arts Presidium Nika Award.

== Family ==
- Father — Mikhail Mukasei
- Mother — Elizaveta Mukasei
- Wife — Svetlana Druzhinina
  - The eldest son — Anatoly Mukasei, died in 1978.
  - The younger son — Mikhail Mukasei (born January 3, 1966), Russian cinematographer and film producer.
    - Grandson — Maksim.
    - Granddaughter — Elizaveta.
  - Daughter in law (from August 17, 2012) — Yekaterina Gamova.

== Selected filmography ==
- Give Me a Book of Complaints (Дайте жалобную книгу, 1964) by Eldar Ryazanov
- Beware of the Car (Берегись автомобиля, 1966) by Eldar Ryazanov
- Attention, Turtle! (Внимание, черепаха!, 1970) by Rolan Bykov
- Telegram (Телеграмма, 1971) by Rolan Bykov
- Big School-Break (Большая перемена, 1972) by Aleksei Korenev
- The Nose (Нос, 1977) by Rolan Bykov
- While the mad dream (Пока безумствует мечта!, 1978) by Daniil Khrabrovitsky
- The Circus Princess (Принцесса цирка, 1982) by Svetlana Druzhinina
- Scarecrow (Чучело, 1984) by Rolan Bykov
- Secrets of Palace Revolutions (Тайны дворцовых переворотов, 2000-2013) by Svetlana Druzhinina
