= Dmitry Kharatyan =

Soviet and Russian actor (born 1955)

- Дмитрий Харатьян
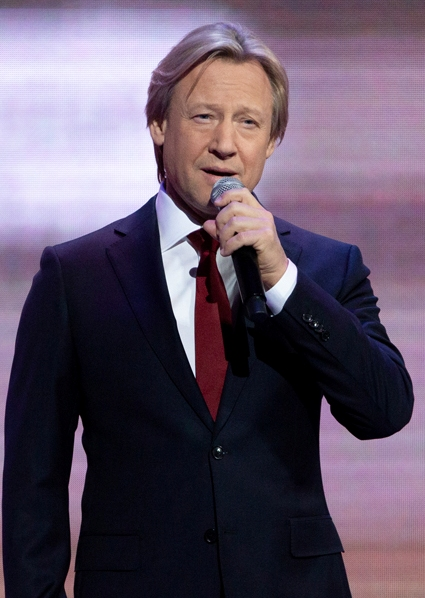
- Kharatyan in 2019
- Born: 21 January 1960 (age 66); Olmaliq, Uzbek SSR, Soviet Union
- Occupation: Actor
- Years active: 1977–present
- Spouses: Marina Burimova (m. 1982; div. 1988) Marina Majko (m. 1989)
- Awards: People's Artist of Russia
- Website: www.kharatyan.sitecity.ru

Dmitry Vadimovich Kharatyan (Note: Russian: Дми́трий Вади́мович Харатья́н Armenian: Դմիտրի Վադիմովիչ Խառատյան, romanized: Dmitri Vadimovich Kharratyan) (born 21 January 1960) is a Soviet and Russian actor of Armenian descent, People's Artist of Russia.

He was born in Olmaliq, Uzbek SSR, on 21 January 1960. His debut as an actor came in Vladimir Menshov's Practical Joke, in 1977.

In March 2014, he signed a letter in support of the position of the Russian president, Vladimir Putin, on the Russian annexation of Crimea. In April and May 2022, Kharatyan participated in a series of concerts organized in order to support the 2022 Russian invasion of Ukraine. In January 2023, Ukraine imposed sanctions on Dmitry for his support of the 2022 Russian invasion of Ukraine.

== Selected filmography ==
- Practical Joke (1977) as Igor Grushko
- Fox Hunting (1980) as Kostya Stryzhak
- Summer Impressions of Planet Z (1986) as Andrei Morkovkin
- Gardes-Marines, Forward! (1988) as Aleksei Korsak
- Private Detective, or Operation Cooperation (1989) as Dmitry Puzyrev
- Viva Gardes-Marines! (1991) as Aleksei Korsak
- Weather Is Good on Deribasovskaya, It Rains Again on Brighton Beach (1992) as Fyodor Sokolov / One-Eyed Sheik
- Gardemarines-III (1992) as Aleksei Korsak
- Black Square (1992)
- The Secret of Queen Anne or Musketeers Thirty Years After (1993) as Louis XIV / Philip Marchiali
- Moscow Saga (2004) as Shevchuk
- Cars (2006; Russian voice) as Lightning McQueen
- The Return of the Musketeers, or The Treasures of Cardinal Mazarin (2009) as Louis XIV
- The Cube (Russian version; 2013) as Host
