= Practical Joke (1977 film) =

- Directed by: Vladimir Menshov
- Written by: Semyon Lungin
- Produced by: Valentin Maslov
- Starring: Dmitry Kharatyan; Yevgeniya Khanayeva; Natalya Vavilova; Andrey Gusev; Zinovy Gerdt; Oleg Tabakov
- Cinematography: Mikhail Bitz
- Edited by: Elena Mikhailova
- Music by: Aleksandr Flyarkovsky
- Production company: Mosfilm
- Release date: 1977
- Running time: 91 minutes
- Country: Soviet Union
- Language: Russian

Practical Joke (Russian: Poзыгрыш, romanized: Rozygrysh) is a 1977 romantic drama directed Vladimir Menshov. The film was his feature directorial debut.

It was a hit movie and became the leader of Soviet film distribution in 1977.

== Plot ==
The action takes place in an ordinary Soviet school.

On the weekend, students of the 9 "B" class gathered for a party. The party dragged on, and the guys were unable to prepare for a number of tests scheduled for Monday. The class leader Oleg Komarovsky offered to negotiate with the teachers to postpone the tests, and since it was impossible to agree with the math teacher and class teacher 9 "B" Maria Vasilyevna Devyatova, he suggested trying to trick her by telling her that she allegedly didn't warn about the control. The drawing took place, everyone whom Devyatova asked confirmed that nothing was said about the test. Everything was revealed by chance when the teacher unexpectedly asked the modest and shy Taya Petrova if she had warned about the test.

Taya couldn't lie and burst into tears. Maria Vasilyevna realized that she had been deceived. Outraged by the cruelty of the students, Maria Vasilyevna gave "1" ("F") to everyone she asked about the test and delivered a stern rebuke about the unacceptability of their lies and the immorality of what happened: "After all, the test took place. But the tasks in it were not trigonometric, but moral. And you answered them incorrectly."

At the same time, a new student Igor Grushko appears in the class. He lives with his aunt because his mother died and his father has a new family. But he has a talent — he plays guitar, writes songs and dreams of recruiting a group of musicians. Komarovsky understands that his leadership positions will be damaged, and tries to rectify the situation. But the whole conflict of the film is based on the difference in life values. For Igor, this is truth, honesty, the opportunity to engage in creativity, to bring happiness into this world. Of course, he didn't formulate it that way, but he was doing exactly that. For Oleg, the main thing is to achieve the goal by any means.

During the celebration of Maria Vasilyevna's 55th birthday, Komarovsky (unsuccessfully trying to persuade her to remove "1" ("F")) insults the teacher and Taya and runs out of the classroom. Grushko runs out after Komarovsky. He finds Komarovsky in the locker room, their eyes meet, the fight that followed remains behind the scenes. During the school assembly, Grushko says that it was not a fight, but retribution.

== Cast ==
- Dmitry Kharatyan as Igor Grushko, a pupil of 9th class
- Yevgeniya Khanayeva as Maria Vasilievna Devyatova, the class teacher and a teacher of mathematics
- Natalya Vavilova as Taya Petrova, a student
- Andrey Gusev as Oleg Komarovsky, a student
- Zinovy Gerdt as Karl Sigismundovich Yolikov, Chemistry teacher
- Oleg Tabakov as father Komarovsky
- Evdokiya Germanova as Dasha
- Natalya Fateyeva as head teacher
- Garri Bardin as French teacher
- Irina Murzaeva as neighbor Fira Solomonovna
- Vladimir Menshov as physical education teacher Vladimir Valentinovich

== Filming ==
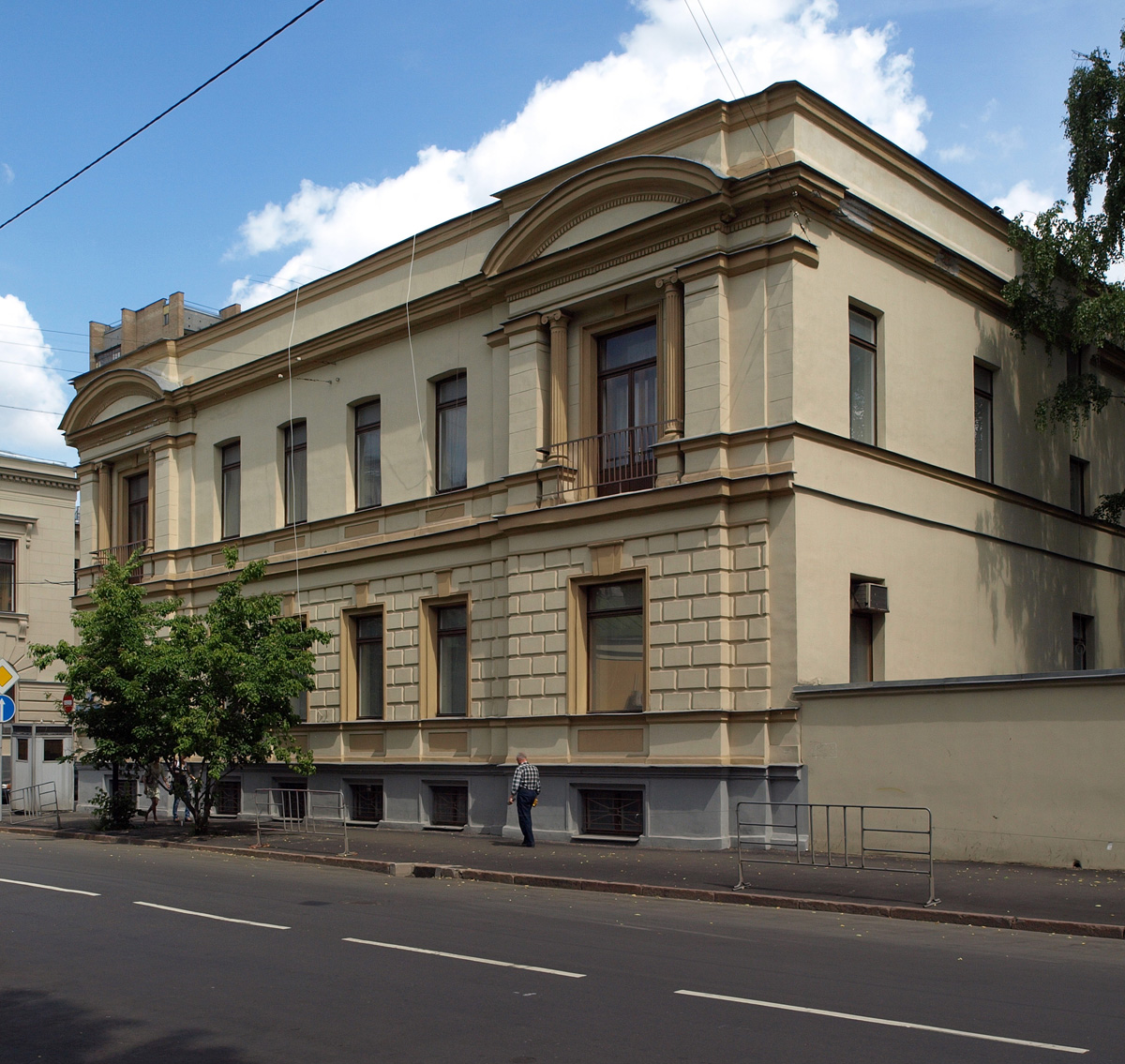
School No. 59 (former Medvednikovskaya gymnasium), Moscow.

The script of the "Practical Joke" was prepared by Semyon Lungin in 1972. Vladimir Menshov, with his performance in the film "A Man at His Place", won the favor of the director of the film studio Nikolai Sizov, and, having told him in a business conversation about his directorial ambitions, he received a stack of scripts from the editorial storerooms; the best option seemed to him to be a "Practical Joke" (although Menshov later admitted that this was not quite the picture, which he wanted to do as his debut).

For 15-year-old Dmitry Kharatyan, the role in the film was his debut; he came to the audition at the insistence of a friend, Galya. Natalya Vavilova and Evdokiya Germanova played their first notable roles. The most experienced of the young artists turned out to be Andrey Gusev, who had managed to appear in four films by that time.

After the release of the film, popularity fell on Kharatyan, which the actor was not ready for.

== Soundtrack ==
The film featured songs by composer Alexander Flyarkovsky based on poems by Alexey Didurov performed by VIA "Dobry Molodtsy", including the famous "Kogda uydyom so shkol'nogo dvora" ("When we Leave the School Yard"). The film includes 5 Didurov's songs: "Kogda uydyom so shkol'nogo dvora", "Babochki" ("Butterflies"), "Strizhi" ("Swifts"), "Pervyi dozhd'" ("The first rain"), "Prosto sel s toboi sluchayno ya" ("I just sat down with you by chance").

Menshov gave Kharatyan the opportunity to record his vocals in the studio, but the guy didn't hit the notes out of excitement, and (due to lack of studio time) the soloist of the ensemble "Dobry Molodtsy" Anatoly Kiselyov sang for him.

== Awards ==
- The Central Committee of the Komsomol's "Scarlet Carnation" for the best film of 1976 for children and youth.
- Award for the best performance of a female role by Yevgeniya Khanayeva, special diploma for the script to Semyon Lungin of the 1977 All-Union Film Festival in Riga, Latvian SSR.
- The State Prize of the RSFSR named after N. K. Krupskaya in 1978 (to Semyon Lungin, Vladimir Menshov, Mikhail Bits, Yevgeniya Khanayeva).

== Remake ==
In 2008, a remake was made in this film in which Dmitry Kharatyan played the role of Oleg Komarovsky's father (in the new film — Komarov), and Evdokiya Germanova as Taya Petrova's mother.
