= Aleksei Petrenko =

Soviet and Russian actor (1938–2017)

- Алексей Петренко
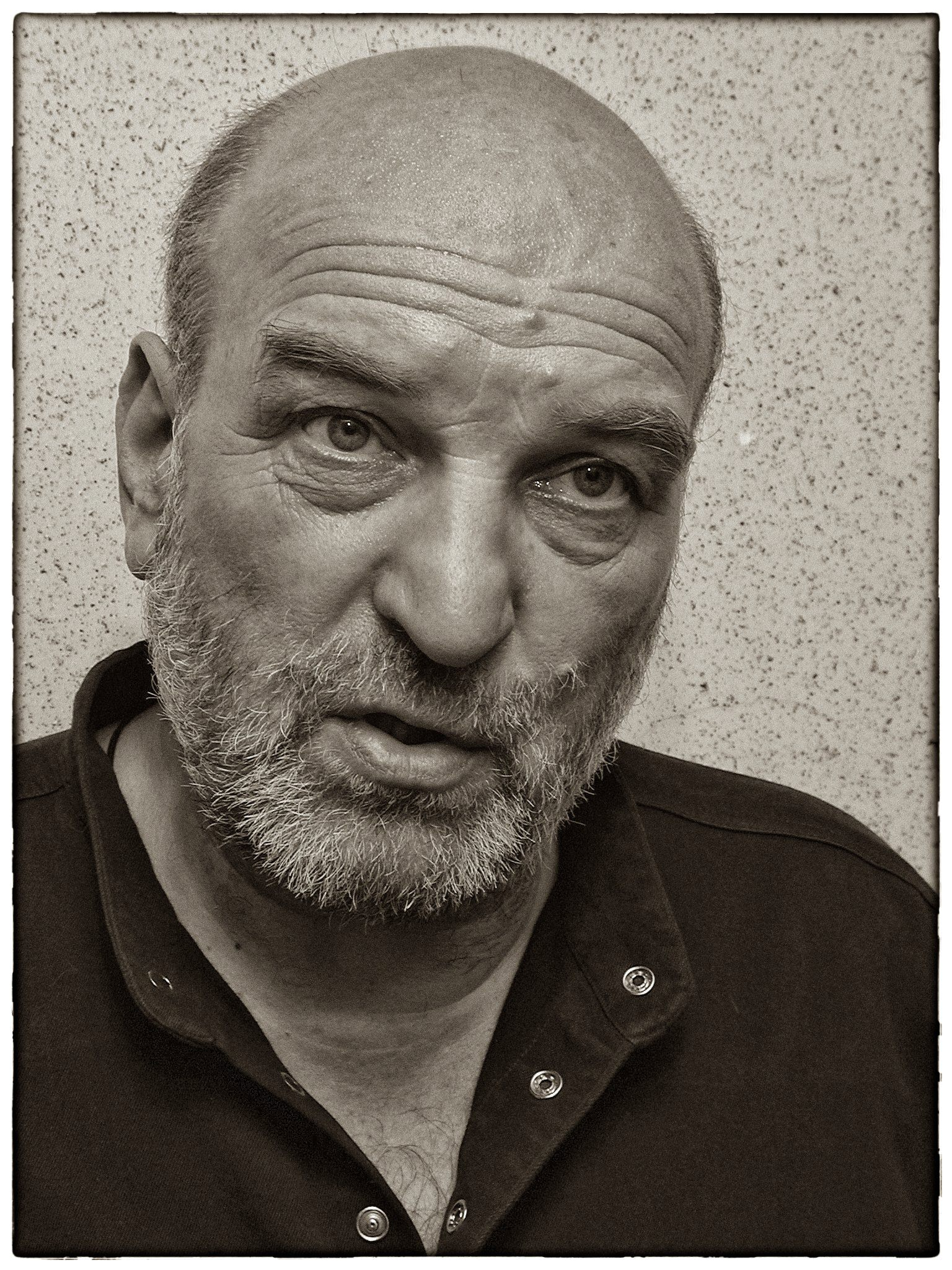
- Petrenko in 2000
- Born: Aleksei Vasilyevich Petrenko; 26 March 1938; Chemer, Kozelets Raion, Chernigov Oblast, Ukrainian SSR
- Died: 22 February 2017 (aged 78); Moscow, Russia
- Occupation: actor
- Years active: 1961–2017
- Spouse: Azima Abdumaminova
- Website: People's Artist of the RSFSR

Aleksei Vasilyevich Petrenko (Russian: Алексей Васильевич Петренко; 26 March 1938 – 22 February 2017) was a Soviet and Russian film and stage actor. He played Grigori Rasputin in Elem Klimov's historical drama Agony and Joseph Stalin in the BBC Two documentary World War II: Behind Closed Doors.

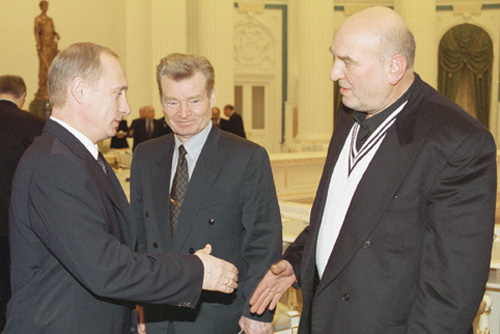
Petrenko (right) greeting President Vladimir Putin in 2001

== Selected filmography ==
- King Lear (Король Лир, 1970) as Oswald
- How Czar Peter the Great Married Off His Moor (Сказ про то, как царь Пётр арапа женил, 1976) as Peter the Great
- Twenty Days Without War (Двадцать дней без войны, 1977) as Yuri Stroganov
- Beda (Беда, 1977) as Kirill Alekseevich, the Director of the school
- Yuliya Vrevskaya (Юлия Вревская, 1978) as Stepan Knyazev
- Marriage (Женитьба, 1978) as Podkolesin Ivan Kuzmich
- Agony (Агония, 1981) as Grigori Rasputin
- Farewell (Прощание, 1983) as Vorontsov
- TASS Is Authorized to Declare... (ТАСС уполномочен заявить, 1984, TV Mini-Series) as Paul Dick
- Lev Tolstoy (Лев Толстой, 1984) as Vladimir Grigoryevich Chertkov
- A Cruel Romance (Жестокий романс, 1984) as Knurov
- Day of Wrath (День гнева, 1985) as Meller
- The Prisoner of Château d'If (Узник замка Иф, 1988, TV Series) as Abbé Faria
- The Servant (Слуга, 1989) as Roman Romanovich Bryzgin
- The Feasts of Belshazzar, or a Night with Stalin (Пиры Валтасара, или Ночь со Сталиным, 1989) as Joseph Stalin
- Presence (Присутствие, 1992) as Petya
- Candles in the Dark (1993) as episode
- Musketeers Twenty Years After (Мушкетёры двадцать лет спустя, 1992) as King Charles I
- The Barber of Siberia (Сибирский цирюльник, 1998) as General Radlov
- Memoirs on Sherlock Holmes (Воспоминания о Шерлоке Холмсе, 2000, TV Series) as Arthur Conan Doyle
- In August 1944 (В августе 44-го..., 2001) as General Yegorov
- The Idiot (Идиот, 2003, TV Mini-Series) as general Ardalion Ivolgin
- Lilacs (Ветка сирени, 2007) as Nicholas Zverev
- 12 (2007) as 5th Juror
- Illusion of Fear (Иллюзия страха, 2008) as Petrovsky
- World War II Behind Closed Doors: Stalin, the Nazis and the West (Вторая мировая война. За закрытыми дверями: Сталин, нацизм и и Запад, 2008, TV Series documentary) as Joseph Stalin
- Wolf Messing: Who Saw through Time (Вольф Мессинг: видевший сквозь время, 2009, TV Series) as Joseph Stalin
- Bury Me Behind the Baseboard (Похороните меня за плинтусом, 2009) as Granddad
- Into The Storm (Навстречу шторму, 2009, TV Movie) as Joseph Stalin
- Burnt by the Sun 2 (Утомлённые солнцем 2, 2010) as elderly lieutenant-accountant
- Yolki 2 (Ёлки 2, 2011) as Grigory Zemlyanikin
- Petrovich (Петрович, 2012) as Trofim Petrovich Streltsov
- Viktor (Виктор, 2014) as Vetrov
- Yolki 5 (Ёлки 5, 2016) as Grigory Zemlyanikin
- Hoffmaniada (Гофманиада, 2018) as Coppelius / Sandman (final film role, released posthumously)

== Awards ==
- Honored Artist of the RSFSR (1984)
- People's Artist of the RSFSR (1988)
- Order For Merit to the Fatherland 4th class (1998)
- State Prize of the Russian Federation(1999)
- People's Artist of Ukraine (1999)
- Golden Eagle Award (2007)
- Order of Honour (2014)
