= Victor Lebedev =

Soviet composer (1935–2021)

Victor Mikhailovich Lebedev (5 January 1935 – 11 March 2021) was a Russian composer (Heavenly Swallows, Be My Husband, Gardes-Marines, Ahead!). He was born in Leningrad, USSR. He was awarded the title of People's Artist of Russia in 2005.

In 1968, he composed an opera of Aleksandr Volkov's The Wizard of the Emerald City, a Russian retelling of L. Frank Baum's The Wonderful Wizard of Oz, on a libretto by William Roshchin and Vladimir Uflyand.

Author of music for 106 Russian films. Member of the Guild of Composers of the Union of Cinematographers of the Russian Federation.

He was married three times. Second marriage with ballerina and actress Natalya Sedykh.
