= Larisa Dolina discography =

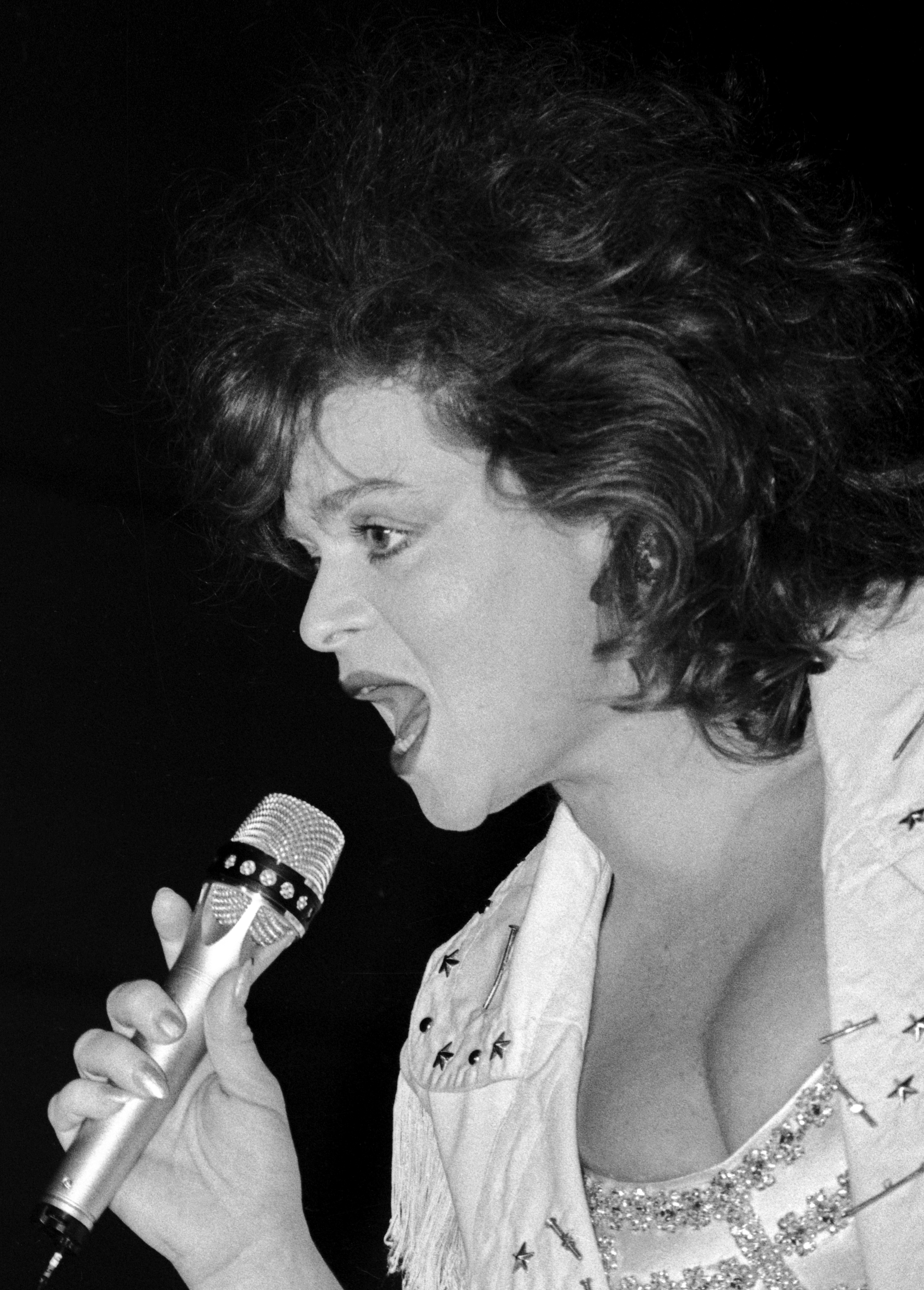
- Dolina performing in 1988
- Studio albums: 19
- Live albums: 2
- Compilation albums: 6
- Singles: 63
- Video albums: 6

The discography of Russian singer Larisa Dolina includes nineteen studio albums, two live albums, six compilations, six video albums and sixty-three singles.

== Albums ==
=== Studio albums ===
Title	Album details
Zatyazhnoy pryzhok	Released: 1986; Label: Melodiya; Format: LP
Novy den	Released: 1989; Label: Balkanton (Bulgaria); Format: LP
Prosti menya	Released: 1993; Label: Gala Records; Format: LP, CD
Privykay... k Larise Dolinoy	Released: 1993; Label: Jeff Records; Format: CD
Dolina v doline strastey, ili noch lyubvi	Released: 1995; Label: S.B.A. Records; Format: CD, MC
"Proshchay"... net "Do svidaniya"	Released: 1996; Label: Z-Records; Format: CD, MC
Pogoda v dome	Released: 1997; Label: Master Sound Records, LD Studio; Format: CD, MC, digital
Schastlivaya dolya	Released: 1998; Label: LD Studio; Format: CD, MC, digital
Pevitsa i muzykant	Released: 1999; Label: LD Studio; Format: CD, MC, digital
Epigraf	Released: 2000; Label: LD Studio; Format: CD, MC, digital
Po-novomu zhit	Released: 2000; Label: LD Studio; Format: CD, MC, digital
Ostrova ljubvi	Released: 2003; Label: Megaliner Records; Format: CD, MC
Ottepel	Released: 2004; Label: LD Studio; Format: CD, MC, digital
Obozhzhyonnaya dusha	Released: 2006; Label: Kvadro-Disk; Format: CD, MC
Hollywood Mood	Released: 28 April 2008; Label: Nikitin; Format: CD
Route 55	Released: 2010; Label: Nikitin; Format: CD, digital
Larisa	Released: 2012; Label: Kvadro-Disk; Format: CD
Snimayem maski, gospoda	Released: 10 September 2015; Label: Media Land, LD Studio; Format: CD, digital
Bud so mnoy	Released: 5 September 2025; Label: Dzhem; Format: digital

=== Live albums ===
Title	Album details
Carnival of Jazz (with Igor Butman's Big Band)	Released: December 2002; Label: LD Studio; Format: CD
Carnival of Jazz II (with Igor Butman's Big Band)	Released: 2010; Label: Nikitin; Format: CD

=== Compilation albums ===
Title	Album details
Ldinka	Released: 1993; Label: Anima Vox; Format: CD, MC
Khity ot Larisy	Released: 1994; Label: Soyuz, Bekar; Format: MC
Grand Collection	Released: 2001; Label: Kvadro-Disk; Format: CD, MC
The Best	Released: 2002; Label: LD Studio; Format: CD
The Best	Released: 2003; Label: Monolit; Format: CD, MC
Slova ne iz pesni	Released: 2005; Label: LD Studio; Format: 4×CD

=== Video albums ===
Title	Album details
Pogoda v dome – Kontsert k 25-letiyu tvorcheskoy deyatelnosti	Released: 1997; Label: LD Studio; Format: VHS
Pevitsa i muzykant	Released: 1999; Label: LD Studio; Format: VHS
Po-novomu zhit	Released: 2000; Label: LD Studio; Format: VHS
Carnival of Jazz (with Igor Butman's Big Band)	Released: 2003; Label: LD Studio; Format: DVD, VHS
Yubiley Larisy Dolinoy v Kremle	Released: 2006; Label: LD Studio, Pervy Kanal; Format: DVD
Carnival of Jazz II (with Igor Butman's Big Band)	Released: 2010; Label: Nikitin; Format: DVD

=== Other albums ===
Title	Album details
Muzyka k kinofilmu "Tantsploshchadka" (Note: Muzyka k kinofilmu "Tantsploshchadka" is the soundtrack to the 1985 film Dance Floor by Samson Samsonov; the composer of the film was Eugen Doga; Dolina's vocal is present on five tracks of the album, all songs performed by her are placed on side A.)	Released: 1986; Label: Melodiya; Format: LP
Kartochny domik (Note: Kartochny domik is a split album; on the A-side there are songs performed by Dolina, while on the B-side there are songs by Mikhail Boyarsky and Viktor Reznikov.)	Released: 1988; Label: Melodiya; Format: LP
Poyot Larisa Dolina	Released: August 1989; Label: GDRZ; Format: Reel-to-Reel

== Singles ==
Title	Year	Peak chart positions		Album
Title	Year	RUS	UKR	Album
"Dve mechty" b/w "Ne zabyvay"	1983	—	—	Non-album single
"Leto bez tebya kak zima" (Note: This is a split single under the title "Elegiya"; two other songs from the album are "Lyubit lish mozhno tolko raz" by Joseph Kobzon and "Elegiya" by Alexander Barykin.)	1985	—	—	Zatyazhnoy pryzhok
"Pesnya Neptuna" b/w "Na poslednem seanse kino"	1986	—	—	Muzyka k kinofilmu "Tantsploshchadka"
"Zhyolty dyavol" b/w "Zvyozdny blyuz"	1990	—	—	Novy den
"Novy god"	2001	58	33	Non-album single
"Ty ne ponyal"	2004	40	20	Ottepel
"Leto" (Remix)	2004	122	73	Non-album singles
"Malenkaya zhenshchina" (Remake)	2004	—	96	Non-album singles
"Something Worth Fighting For"	2004	170	74	Ottepel
"Tantsy na kitayskoy stene"	2005	—	41	Obozhzhyonnaya dusha
"Tsvety pod snegom"	2005	81	49	Obozhzhyonnaya dusha
"Obozhzhyonnaya dusha"	2005	59	37	Obozhzhyonnaya dusha
"Dvesti sorok raz"	2006	38	34	Obozhzhyonnaya dusha
"Roof Garden" (with Al Jarreau)	2006	—	—	Carnival of Jazz
"Puteshestvuyushchy svet"	2007	—	88	Obozhzhyonnaya dusha
"Polchasa"	2007	40	15	Obozhzhyonnaya dusha
"Ne nado slov"	2007	75	131	Obozhzhyonnaya dusha
"V Keypatunskom portu"	2008	—	147	Obozhzhyonnaya dusha
"In LA"	2008	—	—	Hollywood Mood
"Ltybov i odinochestvo"	2008	—	—	Larisa
"Mame"	2009	—	—	Larisa
"Ochered za schastyem"	2014	—	—	Snimayem maski, gospoda
"Katysha"	2015	—	—	Non-album single
"U derevni Kryukovo"	2015	—	—	Snimayem maski, gospoda
"Opyat vesna"	2015	—	—	Snimayem maski, gospoda
"Eto silneye menya"	2016	—	—	Non-album single
"Neznakomyye" (with Gleb Matveychuk)	2017	—	—	Vmeste navsegda
"Ulybaysya mne"	2018	—	—	Non-album singles
"Beregi" (with Yan Osin)	2019	—	—	Non-album singles
"Dokazatelstvo"	2019	—	—	Non-album singles
"Moroz po kozhe"	2019	—	—	Non-album singles
"Tyomnaya noch"	2020	—	—	Non-album singles
"Rossiya" (with Diana Ankudinova and Sergei Volchkov)	2020	—	—	Bud so mnoy
"Po vstrechnoy"	2020	—	—	Bud so mnoy
"Deltaplan" (with Alexey Chumakov and Valery Stepanov)	2020	—	—	Non-album singles
"Kapkan" (with Burito)	2020	54	—	Non-album singles
"Dochka moya" (with Arman Hovhannisyan)	2021	—	—	Non-album singles
"Vmeste navsegda" (with Gleb Matveychuk)	2021	—	—	Vmeste navsegda
"Ldinka" (with Karina Koks)	2021	—	—	Non-album singles
"Murashki po kozhe" (with Gruppa Davinchi)	2021	—	—	Non-album singles
"Noch schatlivykh nadezhd" (with Nikolay Baskov, Dima Bilan, Yulianna Karaulova and Khor akademii Igorya Krutogo)	2021	1	—	Non-album singles
"Sneg idyot"	2021	—	—	Non-album singles
"Bolshe ni slova" (with Aleksander Yelovskikh)	2022	—	—	Non-album singles
"Bezhit ot skuki Moskva" (with Garik Zabelyan)	2022	46	—	Non-album singles
"Dvoye na vetru"	2022	97	—	Non-album singles
"Davay po-khoroshemy" (with Nikolay Baskov)	2022	139	—	Non-album singles
"Ya odin" (with Stas Yarushin)	2022	—	—	Non-album singles
"Mozhno" (with Oksana Kazakova)	2023	—	—	Non-album singles
"Ty moyo radio" (with Baks and Andrey Davinchi)	2023	—	—	Non-album singles
"Devochka moya" (with Lera)	2023	—	—	Non-album singles
"Dublikat"	2023	65	—	Bud so mnoy
"Proydut dozhdi"	2023	—	—	Non-album singles
"Pogoda v dome" (with Chebanov)	2023	—	—	Non-album singles
"Padali listya" (with Aleksandr Oleshko)	2023	—	—	Non-album singles
"Nasha tayna"	2024	—	—	Non-album singles
"Bilas v tvoyo serdtse"	2024	70	—	Non-album singles
"Restoran" (with Masha Sheykh)	2024	—	—	Non-album singles
"Mesto vstrechi planeta Zemlya" (with ST)	2024	—	—	Bud so mnoy
"Ya budu tebya lyubit"	2025	71	—	Bud so mnoy
"Znat, chtoby pomnit" (with Denis Maydanov)	2025	—	—	Patrioticheskiye pesni
"Ostanemsya" (with Sasha Santa)	2025	—	—	Non-album single
"Pokoy" (with Grigory Leps)	2025	—	—	Bud so mnoy
"Atas"	2025	—	—	Lyube 35. Vsyo opyat nachinayetsya
"—" denotes items which were not released in that country or failed to chart.
