= The Bremen Town Musicians (disambiguation) =

The Bremen Town Musicians is a German fairy tale.

The Bremen Town Musicians or the Russian title, Bremenskiye Muzykanty may also refer to:

- The Bremen Town Musicians (1969 film), 1969 Soviet film
  - On the Trail of the Bremen Town Musicians, 1971 sequel
  - The New Bremen Town Musicians, 2000 sequel
- The Bremen Town Musicians (2023 film), 2023 Russian film
- Bremen Town Musicians (sculpture), a public art work by Gerhard Marcks
