= List of Soviet films of 1973 =

A list of films produced in the Soviet Union in 1973 (see 1973 in film).

== 1973 ==
Title	Original title	Director	Cast	Genre	Notes
1973
The Bad Good Man	Плохой хороший человек	Iosif Kheifits	Oleg Dahl	Drama	
The Eccentrics	Чудаки	Eldar Shengelaya	Vasili Chkhaidze, Demno Jgenti, Ariadna Shengelaia	Comedy	
Failure of Engineer Garin	Крах инженера Гарина	Leonid Kvinikhidze	Oleg Borisov, Aleksandr Belyavskiy	Science fiction	
The Headless Horseman	Всадник без головы	Vladimir Vajnshtok	Oleg Vidov	Action	
Hopelessly Lost	Совсем пропащий	Georgi Daneliya	Roman Madyanov, Vladimir Basov, Feliks Imokuede, Vladimir Ivashov	Adventure, comedy	Adaptation of Mark Twain Adventures of Huckleberry Finn. Entered into the 1974 Cannes Film Festival
Incorrigible Liar	Неисправимый лгун	Viplen Azarov	Georgy Vitsin, Inna Makarova, Nikolai Prokopovich, Edita Piekha, Vladimir Etush	Comedy	
Ivan Vasilievich: Back to the Future	Иван Васильевич меняет профессию	Leonid Gaidai	Yuri Yakovlev, Leonid Kuravlev, Aleksandr Demyanenko, Natalia Selezneva, Natalia Krachkovskaya	Comedy	
Looking for a Man	Ищу человека	Mikhail Bogin	Oleg Zhakov	Drama	
Matters of the Heart	Дела сердечные	Azhdar Ibragimov	Antonina Shuranova	Drama	
Much Ado About Nothing	Много шума из ничего	Samson Samsonov	Galina Jovovich	Comedy	
This Merry Planet	Эта весёлая планета	Yuri Saakov, Yuri Tsvetkov	Victor Sergachyov, Leonid Kuravlyov, Yekaterina Vasilyeva, Savely Kramarov	Science fiction, comedy	
Nesimi	Насими	Hasan Seyidbeyli	Rasim Balayev	Biopic	
No Return	Возврата нет	Aleksei Saltykov	Nonna Mordyukova	Drama	
The Nutcracker	Щелкунчик	Boris Stepantsev and Boris Larin		Animation	
Old Walls	Старые стены	Viktor Tregubovich	Lyudmila Gurchenko	Drama	
Sea Cadet of Northern Fleet	Юнга Северного флота	Vladimir Rogovoy	Algis Arlauskas	Drama	
Seventeen Moments of Spring	Семнадцать мгновений весны	Tatyana Lioznova	Vyacheslav Tikhonov, Yefim Kopelyan, Leonid Bronevoy, Ekaterina Gradova, Rostislav Plyatt	War drama	
Talents and Admirers	Таланты и поклонники	Isidor Annensky	Svetlana Pelikhovskaya	Drama	
The Silence of Dr. Evans	Молчание доктора Ивенса	Budimir Metalnikov	Sergey Bondarchuk		
Stepmom	Мачеха	Oleg Bondaryov	Tatiana Doronina	Drama	
Only Old Men Are Going to Battle	В бой идут одни „старики“	Leonid Bykov	Leonid Bykov	War drama	
On the Trail of the Bremen Town Musicians	По следам бременских музыкантов	Vasily Livanov	Anatoli Gorokhov, Elmira Zherzdeva, Muslim Magomaev, Gennady Gladkov	Animation	
That Sweet Word: Liberty!	Это сладкое слово — свобода!	Vytautas Žalakevičius		Drama, action	Won the Golden Prize at the 8th Moscow International Film Festival
The Twelve Months	Двенадцать месяцев	Anatoliy Granik	Larisa Zhvaniya, Nikolay Volkov	Fantasy	
Vanyushin's Children	Дети Ванюшина	Yevgeny Tashkov	Boris Andreyev	Drama	
With You and Without You	С тобой и без тебя	Rodion Nakhapetov	Marina Neyolova	Comedy	
