= Inessa Kovalevskaya =

Russian animation director (born 1933)

- Инесса Ковалевская
- Born: 1 March 1933 (age 93); Moscow, Russian SFSR, Soviet Union
- Occupations: Animation director, screenwriter
- Years active: 1958–2001

Inessa Alekseyevna Kovalevskaya (Russian: Инесса Алексеевна Ковалевская; born 1 March 1933) is a Soviet and Russian former animation director at Soyuzmultfilm known for her musical animated films and The Bremen Town Musicians in particular. She is a member of ASIFA. She was named the Merited Art Worker of the Russian Federation in 2002.

== Early life ==
Inessa Kovalevskaya was born in Moscow to Lyudmila Petrovna Kovalevskaya (1912—1989) and Aleksey Ivanovich Kovalevsky (1901—1950). Her father was a decorated major general, historian, director of the V.I. Lenin Political-Military Academy (1943—1948) and the Academy of Social Sciences under the CPSU Central Committee (1948—1950).

She managed to enter the Moscow Region State University with the help of her father's compatriot, where she studied for two years, simultaneously visiting art and drama courses. She spent another two years studying for a theatre director at the Moscow Art Theatre School and in 1954 entered the Lunacharsky State Institute for Theatre Arts to study for a theatre historian. She graduated in 1958 and joined the State Committee for Cinematography to work as an editor of the Moldovan film and animation industry up until 1961.

Kovalevskaya was then suggested to supervise Soyuzmultfilm, but soon left her place for the High Courses for Scriptwriters and Film Directors and in 1964 joined the studio as an animation director. She had studied music since childhood and dreamed of directing musical films. Her diploma short Automaton (1965) featured stop motion animation, but she switched to traditional animation which allowed for more diversity when choosing music genres. She regularly teamed with the composer Gennady Gladkov, songwriter Yuri Entin and actor/singer Oleg Anofriyev who performed multiple roles in different voices.

== The Bremen Town Musicians ==
In 1969 they produced Kovalevskaya's most famous work: The Bremen Town Musicians loosely based on the Town Musicians of Bremen by the Brothers Grimm, with elements of rock and roll. The film premiere was greatly postponed; it was supposed to be preceded by the phonograph record with all the songs, but the Melodiya record label put it on hold for nine months. As Yuri Entin told, he had to forge the director's signature in his absence, the record was finally released and sold 28 million copies across the country, turning into a hit.

This was not, however, tolerated by some members of the artistic council responsible for post-production. Khrennikov himself later defended the series and helped to release the second record. The film was still approved and released to overwhelming success, turning into a cultural phenomenon, launching careers of its creators.

The State Committee for Cinematography even wanted to send it to the animation festival in Berlin, but changed its mind at the last minute. Kovalevskaya wrote in her memoirs that it had nothing to do with censorship: one of the leading animators used his influence to abort the nomination in favor of his own work. When she was approached by the same team and offered to direct a sequel, she refused. It was eventually directed by Vasily Livanov in 1973 who co-wrote both screenplays. Kovalevskaya herself said that she didn't like the original screenplay and suggested to add a new character of PI, but after a while she found out that the film was already in production with Livanov as a director.

== Later career ==
She continued making musical shorts, only with a focus on the youngest audience. Katerok (or Little Motorboat) (1970), The Tale of the Priest and of His Workman Balda (1973), How the Lion Cub and the Turtle Sang a Song (1974), At Port (1975) and Chuchello-Meowchello (1982) also gained popularity, both as cartoons and phonograph records (which she also produced by herself at the Melodiya label), and the songs were regularly performed by various pop artists.

Since 1976 she has been directing "musical fantasies" based on the music pieces by Russian classical composers such as Children's Album by Pyotr Ilyich Tchaikovsky, Kamarinskaya by Mikhail Glinka, Pictures at an Exhibition by Modest Mussorgsky and Dances of the Dolls by Dmitri Shostakovich. They were shown on TV as part of educational music programs. In 1993 she adapted several plays by Edvard Grieg into The Gnomes and the Mountain King film. During the 1990s she took an active part at managing Soyuzmultfilm and resisting the attempts to destroy it.

Kovalevskaya also created screenplays to many of her cartoons as well as various radio shows. She wrote a number of fairy tale books and the book of memoirs The First National Musical "The Bremen Town Musicians". True Story. She was named the Merited Art Worker of the Russian Federation in 2002 and awarded a special prize at the first Icarus National Animation Award in 2015.

== Selected filmography ==
- Automaton (1965) — director
- Four from the Same Yard (1967) - director
- The Bremen Town Musicians (1969) — director
- Katerok (or Little Motorboat) (1970) — director
- Songs of the Years of Fire (1971) - director, screenwriter
- The Russian Melodies (1972) - director
- The Tale of the Priest and of His Workman Balda (1973) — director, screenwriter
- How the Lion Cub and the Turtle Sang a Song (1974) — director
- At Port (1975) — director
- Children's Album (1976) — director, screenwriter
- The Master Craftsman (1978) — director, screenwriter
- Kamarinskaya (1980) — director, screenwriter
- Chuchello-Meowchello (1982) — director
- Pictures at an Exhibition (1984) — director, screenwriter
- Dances of the Dolls (1985) — director, screenwriter
- Adventures of Kuzya the Grasshopper (1990-1991) — director, screenwriter
- The Gnomes and the Mountain King (1993) — director, screenwriter
- Dora-Dora-pomidora (2001) — director, screenwriter

== Bibliography ==
- Inessa Kovalevskaya (2004). Fairy Tales-Cartoons. — Moscow: Blago, 56 pages ISBN 5-98509-036-1
- Inessa Kovalevskaya (2015). The First National Musical "The Bremen Town Musicians". True Story. — Moscow: APCPublishing, 102 pages ISBN 978-5990520066

== See also ==
- History of Russian animation
