= The New Bremen Town Musicians =

- Directed by: Alexander Gorlenko
- Written by: Vasily Livanov; Yuri Entin
- Starring: Philipp Kirkorov; Mikhail Boyarsky; Nadezhda Babkina; Sergey Mazayev; Gennady Gladkov
- Music by: Gennady Gladkov
- Production company: Kinomost
- Release date: 24 May 2000
- Running time: 56 minutes
- Country: Russia
- Language: Russian

The New Bremen Town Musicians (Russian: Новые бременские, romanized: Novye Bremenskiye) is a 2000 Russian animated film and a sequel to the films The Bremen Town Musicians and On the Trail of the Bremen Town Musicians. None of the cast from the first two films reprised their roles.

== Plot ==
A son was born to Troubadour and the Princess who has already grown up, the King became poor, and the Chieftain, along with the bandits, has reformed and retrained into a banker who owns the bank "Byaki-Buki" and lives in a comfortable manner. Although the Chieftain got rich, she still wants more - her ultimate desire is power. The Detective collects "compromising evidence" on the King and shows photos to the Chieftain depicting a lonely impoverished crying ruler. She comes to the palace of the King (whom everyone has forgotten) and invites him to marry her, assuring that she will provide him with money, but the King has not yet lost pride and refuses. Then the Chieftain returns to the bank where she has a plan to kidnap the junior Troubadour. For this she calls the Genius Detective, and he goes in search of the young Troubadour.

Troubadour Jr. is studying at the Music Academy and does not know about his origin. The Donkey, the Dog, the Cat, and the Rooster try to teach him "classical music", but Troubadour Jr. dreams of "singing rock'n'roll" (although this criticism is puzzling, because the music that the quartet performs is in fact this). After offending the academicians, he remains alone and begins to dream of adventure. Immediately in front of him appears the Detective and reveals the secret of his origin. Then he suggests to Troubadour Jr. to go to the grandfather King, to which Troubadour Jr. agrees. After meeting with him, the King cheers up and throws a ball in honor of the heir. During the ball, three robbers of the Chieftain, clad in servant costumes, catch Troubadour Jr., after lulling everyone with a tarragon containing sleeping aid. Together with the Detective, they deliver him to the bank and lock him in a safe. In the palace they leave a note from Chieftain: "Either marry me tomorrow or say goodbye to your grandson!". The king immediately raises his entire guard and makes charge against the bank "Byaki-Buki". Together with the guards, the Bremen musicians also go to attack, but when they approach the bank, they are met by the Syllabus, who is an expert on martial arts. After the defeat, the musicians decide to develop a new plan. The Princess comes up with one and everyone agrees with her. The King sends a telegram to the Chieftain with the consent.

The next day a wedding cortege arrives at the palace. From it appears Chieftain in veil, and behind her are the robbers carrying a bag containing the hostage. She is met by the Dog, the Donkey, the Cat and the Rooster who deliver strange verses. While they distract the Chieftain, the Dog changes bags. Everyone is waiting for the King to show up and suddenly he appears dressed in a dressing gown, slippers and without a wig. He declares that he agrees to marry her, but refuses power and transfers the crown to his grandson. Angered by the fact that her plan fell apart, the Chieftain shouts to the King to leave. Suddenly, Troubadour Jr. appears wearing the crown and mantle and orders the guards to arrest the Robbers, Chieftain and the Detective. The confounded robbers untie the sack from which the Cat jumps out. The door opens and from there comes out a huge knight's armor (on closer inspection it turns out that the Donkey, Dog and Rooster are wearing the armor), threateningly approaching the kidnappers. They, in fear, run away to the jubilation of the crowd. Everyone is happy, and the young Troubadour refuses the crown and receives a guitar as a gift from his father. He finds himself new musician friends: young Donkey, Dog, Cat and Rooster (who all become the animals' successors). They leave with Troubadour Jr. for new adventures.

== Cast ==
- Philipp Kirkorov (Troubadour)
- Mikhail Boyarsky (King)
- Nadezhda Babkina (Chieftain)
- Anton Biseev (Troubadour Jr.)
- Elena Kuzmina (Princess)
- Alex Shaw (Alexander Movshevich) (Detective)
- George Mamikonov (Donkey)
- Sergey Mazayev (Dog)
- Gennady Gladkov (Cat)
- Sergey Penkin (Rooster)
- Leonid Serebrennikov, Gennady Gladkov (robbers)
- Sergei Mazaev, Gennady Gladkov, Sergey Penkin (security guards)
- A vocal ensemble under the direction of Lyudmila Bogomolova (Courtiers)

== Reception ==
Despite significant money invested in production and advertising, the film was not nearly as much as popular as the Soviet prototypes and received mostly negative reviews. The rating of the film at Kinopoisk is 4.2 of 10.

== See also ==
- History of Russian animation
