= The Tale of the Priest and of His Workman Balda =

Russian Fairy-tale

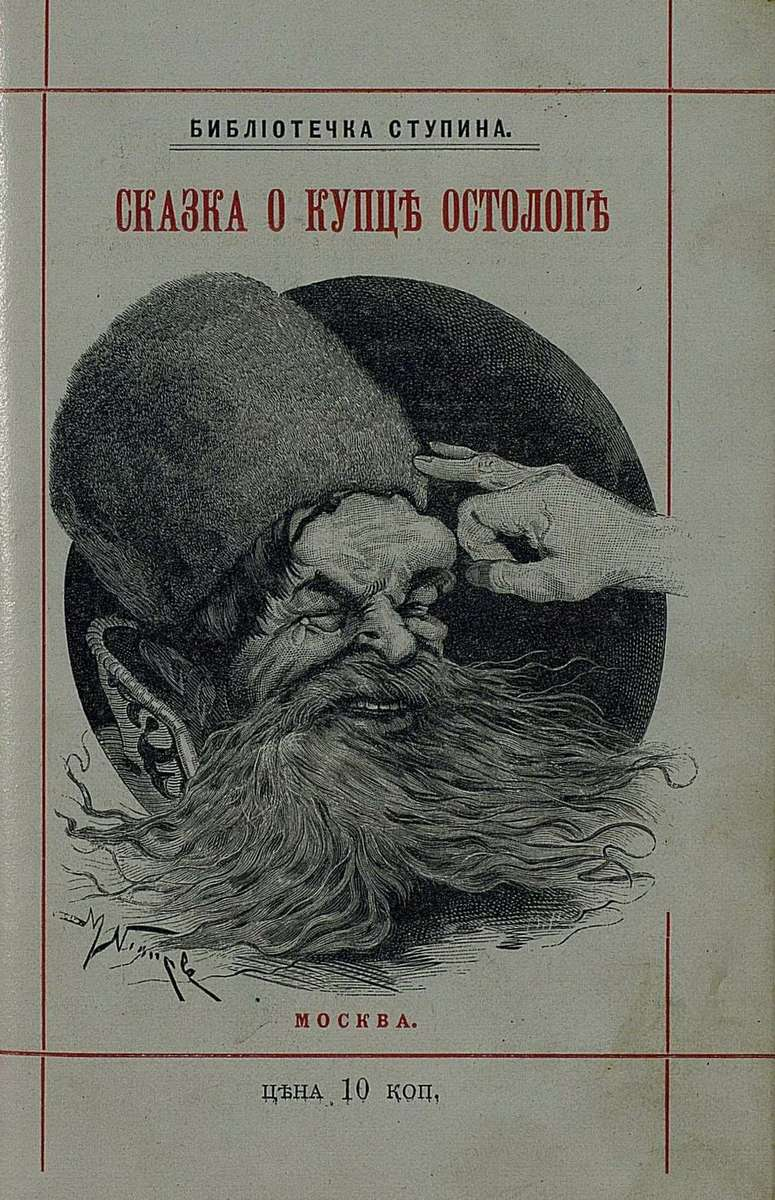

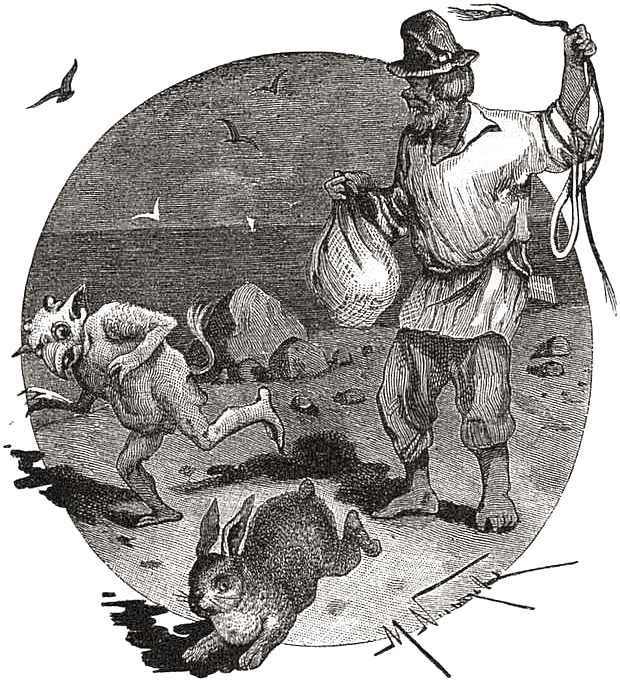
The Tale of the Priest and of his Workman Balda

"The Tale of the Priest and of his Workman Balda" (Russian: «Сказка о попе и о работнике его Балде», romanized: Skazka o pope i o rabotnike yego Balde) is a fairy tale in verse by Alexander Pushkin. Pushkin wrote the tale on September 13, 1830, while staying at Boldino. It is based on a Russian folk tale which Pushkin collected in Mikhaylovskoye early on. The Tale of the Priest and of his Workman Balda consists of 189 extremely varied lines that range from three to fourteen syllables but made to rhyme in couplets. In the summer of 1831, Pushkin read the tale to Nikolai Gogol who liked it a great deal. The Tale was first published posthumously by Vasily Zhukovsky in 1840 with considerable alterations due to censorship; the Priest character was replaced by a merchant.

== Plot summary ==
The poem tells of a lazy priest who is wandering around a market looking for a cheap worker. There he meets Balda (Балда in Russian means a stupid or just simple, or not very serious person) who agrees to work for a year without pay except that he be allowed to hit the priest three times on his forehead and have cooked spelt for food. The priest, being a cheapskate, agrees. But then, after he gets a chance to observe Balda at work, he sees that he is not only very patient and careful, but also very strong. That worries the priest greatly and he starts giving Balda impossible missions to accomplish.

The Priest asks Balda to collect a fabricated debt from sea devils. Balda troubles the sea with rope and forces the leader of the devils, an "old Bies", to come out. He agrees to pay the debt if Balda will defeat his grandson at running and weight carrying. Balda tricks the "little Bies", first by getting a hare, whom he proclaims his "younger brother" to run in his stead, and then by "carrying" a horse between his two legs by riding on it.

The story ends when Balda gives the priest three blows to the forehead which results in the priest losing his mind. The final line is, "You shouldn't have gone rushing off after cheapness."

== Adaptations ==
- 1933-1936 - The Tale of the Priest and of His Workman Balda, USSR, animated film by Mikhail Tsekhanovsky, and the surviving film score by Dmitri Shostakovich
- 1940 - The Tale of the Priest and of His Workman Balda, USSR, traditionally animated film by Panteleymon Sazonov.
- 1956 - The Tale of the Priest and of His Workman Balda, USSR, live-action and Puppetry/stop motion-animated film by Anatoly Karanovich.
- 1973 - The Tale of the Priest and of His Workman Balda, USSR, traditionally animated film by Inessa Kovalevskaya.

== Portrayal of priest protested ==
On October 5, 2006, Sophia Kishkovsky reported in The New York Times that "In the northern city of Syktyvkar, the State Theater of Opera and Ballet of the Republic of Komi, a region once notorious as a center of the prison camp system, or Gulag, recently bowderlized a commemorative performance of 'The Tale of Priest and his Workman Balda' ...after the local diocese objected to the portrayal of the priest in the work." The resulting production was "reduced to a series of numbers..., none of which included the priest."

Conflict over similar matters had also arisen in Dnipropetrovsk Opera and Ballet Theatre on Christmas & New Year Season of 2006/2007.
