= Did We Meet Somewhere Before =

- Russian poster
- Russian: Мы с вами где-то встречались
- Directed by: Nikolay Dostal; Andrey Tutyshkin
- Written by: Vladimir Polyakov
- Starring: Arkadi Rajkin; Lyudmila Tselikovskaya; Mikhail Yanshin; Maria Vladimirovna Mironova; Vladimir Lepko; Vasili Merkuryev
- Cinematography: Yuri Yekelchik
- Edited by: Claudia Moskvina
- Music by: Anatoliy Lepin
- Production company: Mosfilm
- Release date: 1954
- Running time: 92 min.
- Country: Soviet Union
- Language: Russian

Did We Meet Somewhere Before (Russian: Мы с вами где-то встречались, romanized: My s vami gde-to vstrechalis) is a 1954 Soviet comedy film directed by Nikolay Dostal and Andrey Tutyshkin.

== Plot ==
The film tells about the successful comic actor Gennadiy Maksimov who goes with his wife, Larisa, to the Crimea. But suddenly Larisa is called to the theater of miniatures instead of one actress, who fell ill, and she leaves her husband. He had to fall behind the train. On the way, he gets to know different people and every meeting is a small play.

== Starring ==
- Arkadi Rajkin as Gennadiy Vladimirovich Maksimov
- Lyudmila Tselikovskaya as Larisa Levkoyeva
- Mikhail Yanshin as Vasilyev
- Maria Mironova as Veronika Platonovna Malyarskaya
- Vladimir Lepko as Afanasiy Ivanovich
- Vasili Merkuryev as director of theater
- Aleksandr Benyaminov as photographer
- Olga Aroseva as resting girl
- Andrey Tutyshkin as Fedor Vasilievich
- Mikhail Pugovkin as policeman
- Sergey Filippov as unhappy photographer client
- Vladimir Gulyaev as cyclist
- Galina Korotkevich as Maksimov's compartment neighbor
- Nikolay Trofimov as taxi driver
- Zinaida Sharko as telephone operator at the post office, Maksimov's fan
- Yuri Sarantsev as administrator of the miniature theater
- Stepan Kayukov as train station grocery seller
