= Pogoda v dome =

Studio album by Larisa Dolina
- Released: 1997
- Recorded: 1997
- Studio: Gala Records Studio, Moscow; Olimp-Studiya, Moscow
- Genre: Pop; Russian chanson
- Length: 64:28
- Language: Russian
- Label: Master Sound; LD Studio
- Producer: Victor Mityazov

Larisa Dolina chronology
| "Proshchay"... net "Do svidaniya" (1996) | Pogoda v dome (1997) | Schastlivaya dolya (1998) |

Pogoda v dome (Russian: Погода в доме; transl. The Weather in the House), subtitled 17 shlyagerov Ruslana Gorobtsa i Mikhaila Tanicha (Russian: 17 шлягеров Руслана Горобца и Михаила Танича; transl. 17 Schlagers by Ruslan Gorobets and Mikhail Tanich), is the eight studio album by Russian singer Larisa Dolina, released in 1997 by Master Sound Records for LD Studio.

== Overview ==
The album was created in collaboration with composer Ruslan Gorobets and poet Mikhail Tanich.

On 23 and 24 December 1996, the premiere of Larisa Dolina's jubilee solo program "The Weather in the House" took place at the "Rossiya" State Central Concert Hall. Famous hits of the singer were performed in this musical show, and the new album Pogoda v dome was also presented. Irina Otiyeva and Sergey Lemokh took part in the show.

The album was a great success. In particular, according to the "Russian Music Yearbook" compiled by specialists of the InterMedia agency, the album Pogoda v dome became the best-selling album in 1997 in Russia, released on cassette, selling more than 1,500,000 copies; among the albums released on compact discs, it became the second. It also won the Ovation National Russian Music Award as best album of the year (1998).

== Track listing ==
All lyrics are written by Mikhail Tanich; all music is composed by Ruslan Gorobets

| No. | Title | Length |
|---|---|---|
| 1. | "Pogoda v dome" | 4:18 |
| 2. | "Khochu byt lyubimoy" | 3:58 |
| 3. | "Prosto tango" | 4:17 |
| 4. | "Uvizhu, uznayu" | 3:36 |
| 5. | "Gruppa krovi" | 4:37 |
| 6. | "Obizhayus" | 3:22 |
| 7. | "Diyeta" | 3:25 |
| 8. | "Moskvichka" | 4:02 |
| 9. | "Proyekhali" | 3:45 |
| 10. | "Malchik moy" | 3:24 |
| 11. | "Gosti" | 3:56 |
| 12. | "Restoran" | 3:26 |
| 13. | "Ty snishsya mne" | 3:46 |
| 14. | "Revnuy menya" | 4:07 |
| 15. | "Nol gradusov" | 3:40 |
| 16. | "Do svidanya" | 3:26 |
| 17. | "Tretiy zvonok" | 3:23 |
| Total length: | | 64:28 |

== Personnel ==
- Vocals – Larisa Dolina
- Alto Saxophone – Batyrkhan Shukenov (tracks 13, 16)
- Arrangement – Ruslan Gorobets, Vyacheslav Khusid (1, 5, 7), Sergey Rudnitsky (2, 13), Alexander Samoylov (3), Alexander Bely (4, 6, 8, 14, 15), Daniil Danin (11), Igor Pavlenko (9, 10), Yuri Varum (12, B16)
- Design – Olga Alisova
- Engineer – Valery Tamanov
- Executive Producer – Konstantin Akimov
- Guitar – Anatoly Shevanov (1, 12), Vadim Golutvin (2, 4, 8, 13), Alexander Samoilov (3), Igor Khomich (5), Alexander Pavlenko (11), Talgat Tukhtamyshev (11), Alexander Vengerov (16), Dmitry Chetvergov (17)
- Mastering – Andrey Subbotin
- Piano – Ruslan Gorobets (3, 6, 7, 15)
- Producer – Victor Mityazov, Vsevolod Ustinov (Gala Records), Boris Oppengeym (Olimp-Studiya), Ruslan Gorobets (music)
- Soprano Saxophone – Vladimir Presnyakov Sr. (1, 7)
- Tenor Vocals – Andrey Smekhnov (2)
- Trombone – Anatoly Kulikov (17)
- Trumpet – Viktor Gorbunov (17), Vladimir Kalmykov (17)

Credits are adapted from the album's liner notes.
