= Maria Vladimirovna Mironova =

Soviet and Russian actress

Maria Mironova
- Мария Миронова
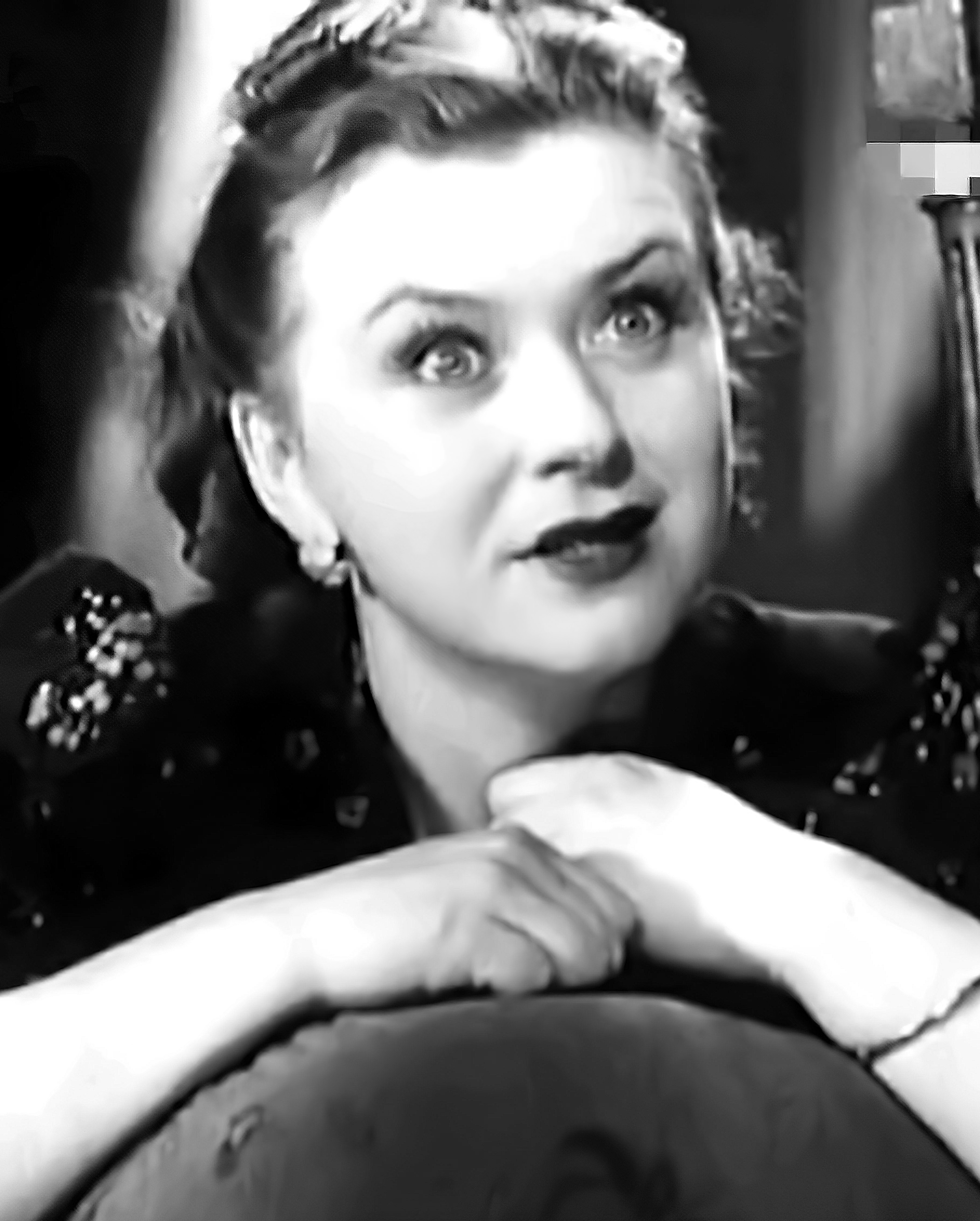
- Mironova in the 1940 film Crime and Punishment
- Born: 7 January 1911; Moscow, Russian Empire
- Died: 13 November 1997 (aged 86); Moscow, Russia
- Burial place: Vagankovo Cemetery, Moscow; 55°46′05″N 37°32′54″E
- Education: Lunacharsky State Institute for Theatre Arts
- Occupation: Actress
- Years active: 1927–1997
- Notable work: Mironova and Menaker
- Spouse: Aleksandr Menaker (died 1982)
- Children: Andrei Mironov
- Relatives: Maria Mironova (granddaughter)
- Awards: People's Artist of the USSR (1991)

Maria Vladimirovna Mironova (Russian: Мари́я Влади́мировна Миро́нова; 7 January 1911 [O.S. 25 December 1910] – 13 November 1997) was a Soviet and Russian actress who worked in film, television and theatre. She was a member of the popular comedy-duo Mironova and Menaker (Russian: Миронова и Менакер), in which she performed with her husband, Aleksandr Menaker, for decades on stage. Her son, Andrei Mironov, was a well-known actor.

She was named People's Artist of the USSR by the Soviet government in 1991.

== Life and career ==
Mironova was born in Moscow to Elizaveta Ivanovna Firsova, a schoolteacher, and Vladimir Nikolayevich Mironov, a merchant from a petite-bourgeoisie family.

In 1927, Mironova graduated from the Lunacharsky State Institute for Theatre Arts (now the Russian Institute of Theatre Arts). She became a member of the popular comedy-duo Mironova and Menaker, in which she performed on stage with her husband, Alexander Menaker, for about three and a half decades since the duo debuted in 1939, until Menaker's death in 1982. They typically acted out scenes of a quarrelling couple; Mironova's characters were often a domineering and ignorant wife, whilst Menaker always took the role of a weak-willed husband. Each sketch they performed took no more than five minutes.

The memoir ...In Their Repertoire (...В своём репертуаре) was published in 1984, written by Mironova in co-authorship with her husband, who had died two years prior to the publication. She acted on stage for the last time in Semyon Zlotnikov's play The Old Man Left the Old Woman (Уходил старик от старухи) just a few days before her hospitalisation and death. Mironova died on 13 November 1997, at the age of 86, at the Moscow Central Clinical Hospital. She was buried at Vagankovo Cemetery next to her son, who had died ten years earlier.

== Selected filmography ==
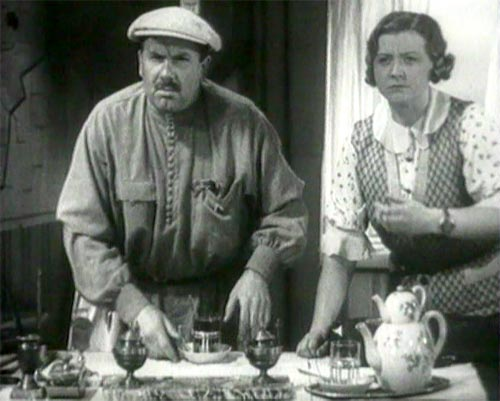
Mironova (right) and Igor Ilyinsky in the 1938 film Volga-Volga

- Volga-Volga (1938)
- Merry Stars (1954)
- The Boys from Leningrad (1954)
- Did We Meet Somewhere Before (1954)
- The Willy-nilly Chauffeur (1958)
- Old Acquaintance (1969 film) (1969)
- An Almost Funny Story (1977)
- Gigolo and Gigolette (1980)
- Assignment (Soviet film) (1980)
- Maritza (film) (1985)
