= An Ordinary Miracle (1978 film) =

- Directed by: Mark Zakharov
- Screenplay by: Mark Zakharov
- Based on: An Ordinary Miracle by Evgeny Schwartz
- Starring: Aleksandr Abdulov; Oleg Yankovsky; Yevgeny Leonov; Yevgeniya Simonova; Irina Kupchenko; Andrei Mironov; Yury Solomin; Vsevolod Larionov
- Cinematography: Nikolai Nemolyaev
- Music by: Gennady Gladkov
- Production company: Mosfilm
- Release date: January 1, 1978
- Running time: 138 minutes
- Country: Soviet Union
- Language: Russian

An Ordinary Miracle (Russian: Обыкновенное чудо, romanized: Obyknovennoye chudo) is a Soviet 1978 romantic fantasy musical film directed by Mark Zakharov and based on a play by Evgeny Schwartz. This is the second adaptation of the play; the first one was filmed in 1964 by Erast Garin.

== Plot ==
External videos
- Good afternoon, I am a king. Leonov's character is introduced to The Wizard and his wife.

The protagonist of the film, the Wizard (Oleg Yankovsky), invents a fairy tale to amuse himself and his wife (Irina Kupchenko). The tale's characters come to life, come to his house and set out to live their lives.

Many years ago, the Wizard came up with a "reverse" fairy tale, turning a bear into a human (Aleksandr Abdulov), who would transform back into a bear as soon as a princess falls in love with him and kisses him. Now, the young man returns to the Wizard's house where he meets a beautiful girl (Yevgeniya Simonova), and they immediately fall in love with each other. To his dismay, she turns out to be a princess – the Wizard made it so that a king (Yevgeny Leonov) who was just passing by with his daughter and his suite felt a sudden urge to stop by the estate. When the Princess, clueless about the young man's origin, wants to kiss him, he flees in horror.

The Princess hurries after him, dressed as a boy. They meet in a tavern called "Emilia", but the Bear, unable to recognize the Princess, summons her to a duel. However, when the Princess cries out "Daddy" during the battle, the Bear realizes that she deceived him.

In anger, he goes to the innkeeper (Yury Solomin) and begs to be to locked up, as the tavern is covered with snow and it is impossible to get out. The innkeeper gives him the key to a room. He draws his attention to one of the court ladies and recognizes in her his first love Emilia, in whose honor he named the inn. The innkeeper and Emilia decide to help the quarreled lovers.

The Princess locks herself in a room on the second floor of the inn and promises to shoot anyone who would come to her. The King orders to draw lots and the lot comes out for the court Minister Administrator (Andrei Mironov). The Administrator comes to the Princess, and a shot rings out – leaving behind the Princess, the administrator shoots her, but misses. The Princess angrily decides to marry the first courter and announces the Administrator to be her fiancé.

The King decides to play a wedding. Desperate, his love taken away from him, the Bear decides to tell all about the princess kiss that would turn him into a beast, but the Princess rejects him.

The wedding procession leaves. The Hunter (Vsevolod Larionov) and the Bear remain in the tavern. The Wizard appears and tells the Bear that he was disappointed in his behavior. He calls the Bear a coward. In the opinion of the Wizard the Bear should have kissed the princess. The fact that he didn't do that shows that he does not love the princess so much as to sacrifice his human form. The Bear and the Hunter make an agreement under which, if ever the Bear is to kiss the Princess and to turn into an animal, the Hunter will kill him.

Exactly one year passes by. The country is actually ruled by the Administrator instead of the King. The Princess is slowly dying of longing for the Bear. The Wizard intentionally does not let the Bear in the country and into his house, because he thinks that the tale with a sad end has much more to teach people, and stories with a happy ending are just for children.

As the Princess feels death coming, the Bear appears in the house of the Wizard. The Hunter is aiming the gun at the Bear. The Bear kisses the princess, but does not turn into a bear, and stays a man. The Wizard explains this paradox to be an ordinary miracle.

The characters leave the Wizard's house that turns out to be all scenery. The decorations burn and the Wizard is left alone.

== Cast ==
Yevgeny Leonov as the King ono a 2026 postcard of Russia

- Oleg Yankovsky as the Wizard
- Aleksandr Abdulov as the Bear
- Yevgeniya Simonova as the Princess
- Yevgeny Leonov as the King
- Irina Kupchenko as the Wizard's wife
- Andrei Mironov as the Minister Administrator
- Yekaterina Vasilyeva as Emilia the First Lady (singing by Larisa Dolina; sole singing by Yelena Charkviani)
- Yury Solomin as Emil the Innkeeper (singing by Leonid Serebrennikov)
- Yervand Arzumanian as the First Minister
- Vsevolod Larionov as the Hunter
- Andrei Leonov as the Hunter's student
- Vladimir Dolinsky as the Executioner

== Filming ==
While working on the script, Mark Zakharov was inspired by the recordings of Joe Dassin.

At the very beginning of filming, Oleg Yankovsky suffered a heart attack; as a result, filming was suspended and began only after the actor left the hospital. Evgeny Leonov, who was filming after a infarction, often offered the director to shoot two takes of a particular scene — a scenario one and an improvisational one — and Zakharov often accepted the second as more accurate and funny. Yevgeniya Simonova had difficulties with the scene of shooting from a pistol, as she did not tolerate guns and shots. Alexander Abdulov performed all the tricks in the film on his own, however, in the scene with the horse at the moment of the jumping, the actor forgot to release his legs from the stirrups, as a result of which the horse drove him several tens of meters on the ground; nevertheless, Abdulov refused the services of a stuntman and performed the trick.

== Soundtrack ==
External videos
- The Wizard's Song

External videos
- Administrator's Ballad

External videos
- Farewell Song

Translation	Original title	Transliterated title	Performer
The Wizard's Song	«Песенка Волшебника»	Pesenka volshebnika	Leonid Serebrennikov
Choir of Emilia's Ladies-in-Waiting	«Хор фрейлин Эмилии»	Khor freylin Emilii	Elena Charkviani
Administrator's Verses	«Куплеты Администратора»	Kuplety Administratora	Andrei Mironov
The duo of Emilia and the Innkeeper	«Дуэт Эмилии и Трактирщика»	Duet Emilii i traktirschika	Larisa Dolina & Leonid Serebrennikov
Administrator's Ballad	«Баллада Администратора»	Ballada Administratora	Andrei Mironov
Farewell Song	«Прощальная песня»	Proschal'naya pesnya	Andrei Mironov & choir
The Hunter's Song (not included in film, vinyl only)	«Песня охотника»	Pesnya okhotnika	Mikhail Boyarsky

In 2022, full soundtrack was released.
