= Boldino Museum =

Museum in Nizhny Novgorod, Russia

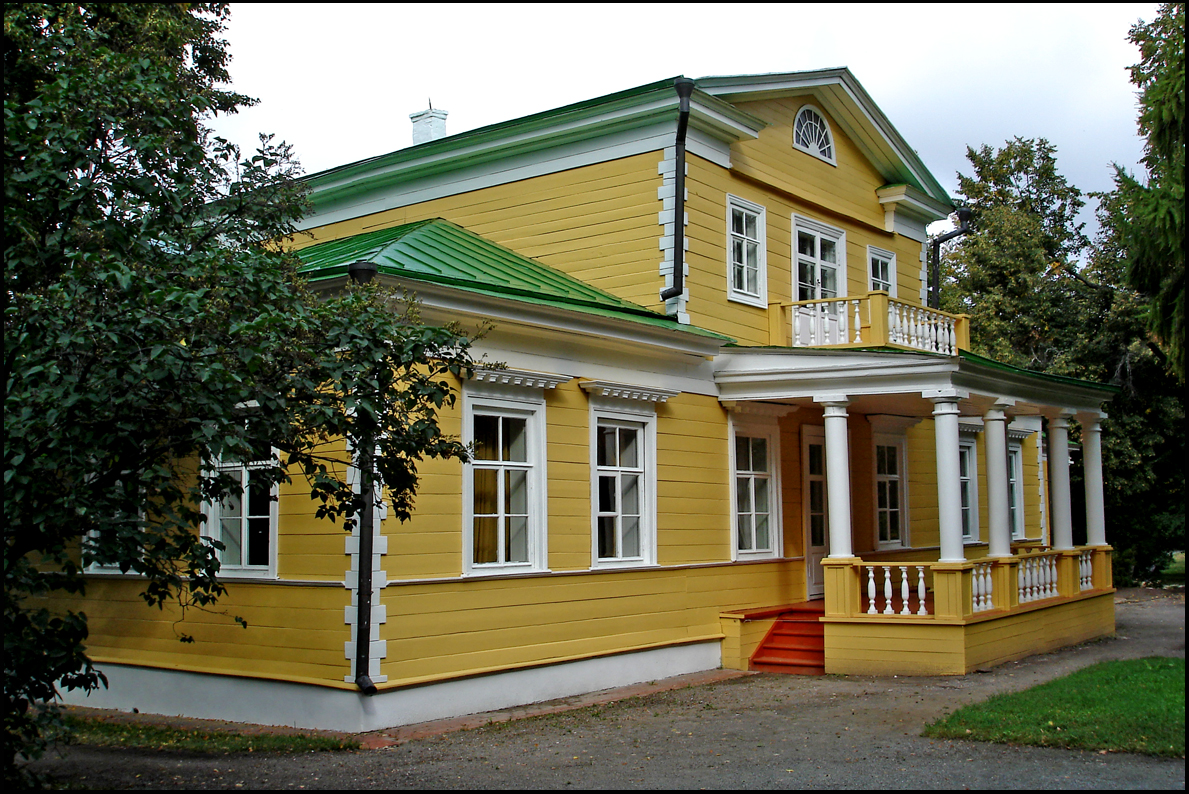
- Interactive map of Boldino Museum
- Location: Bolshoye Boldino, Nizhny Novgorod Oblast, Russia
- Coordinates: 56.32738528071314°N 44.00763649830217°E

Museum-reserve of Alexander Sergeevich Pushkin "Boldino" is a large Russian literary museum reserve, located in the complex of buildings of the family estate of Pushkin in the village of Bolshoye Boldino of the Nizhny Novgorod region, which is associated with one of the most fruitful periods of the poet's work, the "Boldino autumn" (September–November 1830).

== History ==
From 1619 "patrimony in Arzamas district in Zalesnoye going for Sadkovskii gate, the village of Boldino, which was a village Zavorotnyi under a large Mordovian black forest" was listed as belonging to F. F. Pushkin, a participant in the protection of Moscow in 1612. Since 1840 the Boldino owned by the grandfather of Alexander Pushkin, Lev Aleksandrovich Pushkin. At the beginning of the 19th century, the estate was divided between Sergei Lvovich and Vasily Lvovich Pushkin (the poet's father and uncle). After the death of Sergei Lvovich (in 1849), the estate passed to Lev Sergeevich, the poet's brother. In 1911 the estate was purchased by the Treasury.

== Museum ==
Boldino reserve and Pushkin Museum were created in stages. It took a lot of time to restore the original landlord's house, interior interiors, documents and things. The Park around the mansion is also centuries old. It was under these trees that the poet walked, rhyming lines for his poems. The fully renovated complex of the manor house, which includes a house, a kitchen, household services and a human, was ready in 1990. Work was done on the improvement of Boldino Church "assumption" and a house in the village of l'vivka, which also have been a poet. The Museum, dedicated to the Boldin period of the poet's life and work, is located in the former bar house of Pushkin. Since 1949, this land is a Museum-reserve of Pushkin. Now it includes a memorial estate in the village of Bolshoye Boldino, the grove and the estate of the Archer of the poet's son AA Pushkin in the village of Lviv.

== Museum now ==
In 1973, Boldino was included in the route of the annual all-Union Pushkin poetry festival. The Museum-reserve annually takes part in the preparation and holding of the all-Russian festival of Opera and ballet art "boldinskaya autumn". For visitors to the Museum-reserve in addition to the review and thematic excursions, programs of folk-ethnographic character have been developed:" Wide Maslenitsa"," Village gatherings","Yuletide divination". With the involvement of innovative methods of work in the Museum developed and involved additional programs such as" ball of the Pushkin era"," in the mirror of two centuries"," Lesson in the parish school", theatrical tour " History of the village of Goryukhina...", the game program for children "on green, on a meadow", the program for newlyweds "a Wedding in Boldin". Visitors to the Museum have the opportunity to take pictures in costumes of the Pushkin era, a ride on the Phaeton. On the territory of the Museum-reserve opened "Fairy living room", where children's exhibition of creative works of participants of Museum circles and works sent by children to the Museum from other cities of Russia. It also shows the puppet Pushkin ball, where the dolls are made of salted dough pupils of one of the Nizhny Novgorod boarding schools; children show tales of As Pushkin, in addition, visitors to the living room can leave a memory made with their own hands from the proposed material crafts, take a picture in the costume of Pushkin's fairy-tale hero and just relax in a cozy wooden house after a tour of the estate.

== Links ==
1. Boldino Museum on the website about Culture
2. Boldino Museum on the website of tourism
