= Bolsheboldinsky District =

Bolsheboldinsky District Большеболдинский район (Russian)
- District
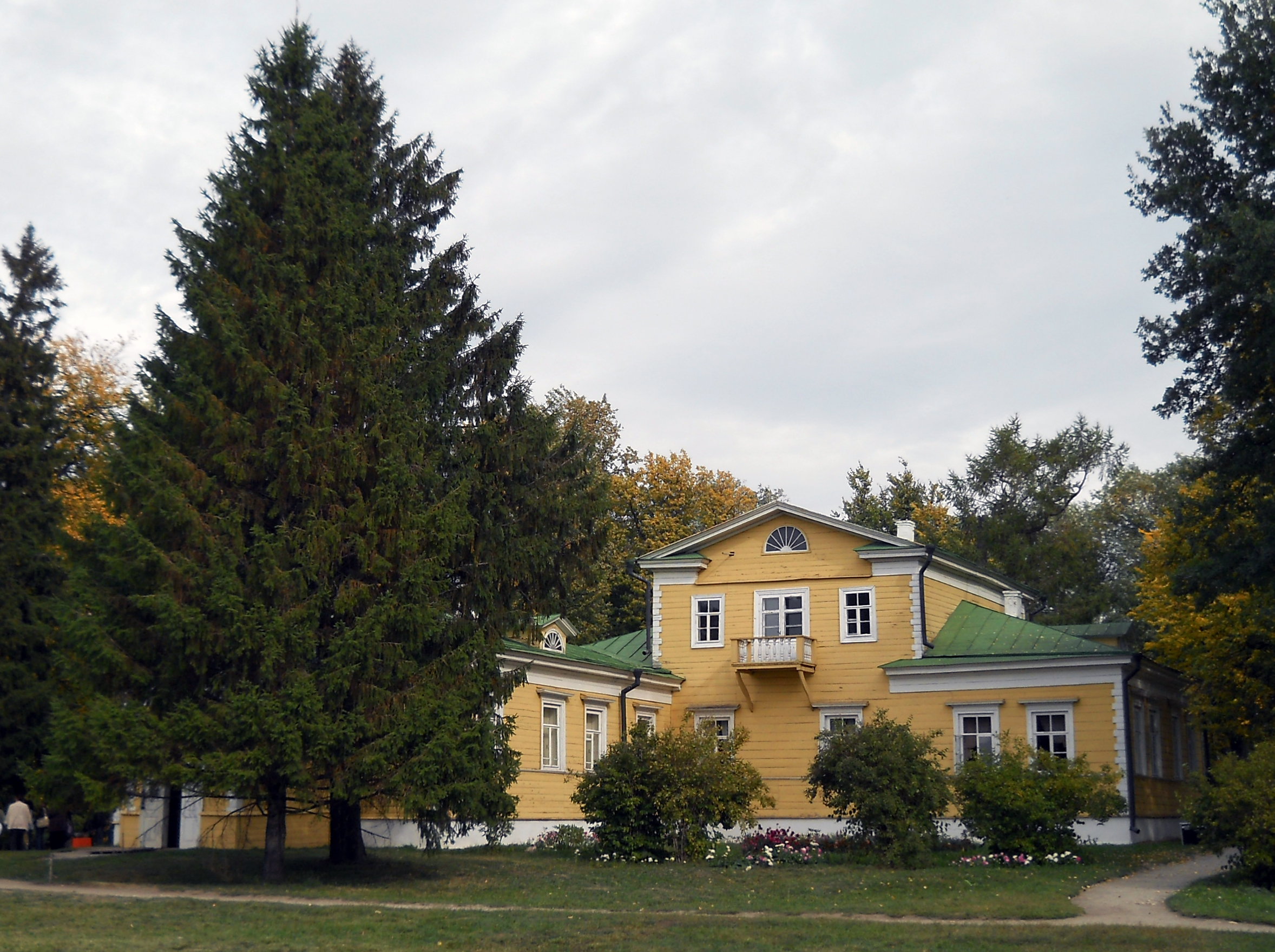
- Bolshoye Boldino. Pushkins' Family manor, Bolsheboldinsky District

- Flag Coat of arms
- Location of Bolsheboldinsky District in Nizhny Novgorod Oblast
- Coordinates: 54°59′53″N 45°10′33″E
- Country: Russia
- Federal subject: Nizhny Novgorod Oblast
- Established: 1929
- Administrative center: Bolshoye Boldino

Area
  - Total: 866.5 km^{2} (334.6 sq mi)

Population (2010 Census)
  - Total: 12,035
  - Density: 13.89/km^{2} (35.97/sq mi)
  - Urban: 0%
  - Rural: 100%

Administrative structure
  - Administrative divisions: 6 Selsoviets
  - Inhabited localities: 56 rural localities

Municipal structure
  - Municipally incorporated as: Bolsheboldinsky Municipal District
  - Municipal divisions: 0 urban settlements, 6 rural settlements
- Time zone: UTC+3 (MSK)
- OKTMO ID: 22609000
- Website: http://www.admbbl.ru

Bolsheboldinsky District (Russian: Большебо́лдинский райо́н) is an administrative district (raion), one of the forty in Nizhny Novgorod Oblast, Russia. Municipally, it is incorporated as Bolsheboldinsky Municipal District. It is located in the southeast of the oblast. The area of the district is 866.5 square kilometers (334.6 sq mi). Its administrative center is the rural locality (a selo) of Bolshoye Boldino. Population: 12,035 (2010 Census); 13,035 (2002 census); 14,156 (1989 Soviet census). The population of Bolshoye Boldino accounts for 42.2% of the district's total population.

== History ==
The district was established in 1929.
