= My Younger Brother =

- Russian poster
- Russian: Мой младший брат
- Directed by: Aleksandr Zarkhi
- Written by: Vasiliy Aksyonov; Mikhail Ancharov; Aleksandr Zarkhi
- Starring: Lyudmila Marchenko; Aleksandr Zbruyev; Oleg Dal; Andrei Mironov; Oleg Efremov
- Cinematography: Anatoliy Petritskiy
- Edited by: Yekaterina Ovsyannikova
- Music by: Mikael Tariverdiev
- Production company: Mosfilm
- Release date: 1962
- Running time: 104 min.
- Country: Soviet Union
- Language: Russian

My Younger Brother (Russian: Мой младший брат, romanized: Moy mladshiy brat) is a 1962 Soviet teen drama film directed by Aleksandr Zarkhi.

The film tells about four friends who, after passing the final exams, decide to go to the Baltic States to feel like adults, and even the attempt of the brother of one of them to dissuade them from the venture fails.

== Plot ==
The story, narrated by two brothers, unfolds as a reflection on personal growth, choices, and sacrifice. The elder brother, Viktor Denisov, is a respected young scientist preparing to defend his dissertation but faces a moral dilemma when his findings contradict his thesis. Meanwhile, his younger brother, Dmitry, freshly graduated from school, rejects guidance and impulsively embarks on a journey from Moscow to Estonia with friends Alyk Kramer, Yuri, and classmate Galya Bodrova, who secretly harbors feelings for him. In Tallinn, the group encounters new acquaintances, and Galya, aspiring to be an actress, attempts to integrate into their artistic world. However, tensions arise as Dmitry’s reckless behavior strains his relationship with Galya, and the group ends up working as laborers in a furniture store before joining a fishing collective on the Estonian coast.

While Viktor chooses to sacrifice his academic career by refusing to defend a flawed dissertation, Dmitry experiences personal growth, taking on responsibility within the collective and forming a relationship with a local girl, Ulvi. Galya reappears, seeking reconciliation, but Dmitry’s brusque rejection leads her to despair. When a Norwegian cargo ship signals for help during a storm, Dmitry rises to the occasion, issuing an on-air apology to Galya. Tragedy strikes as Viktor dies during a work-related test, prompting Dmitry to reflect on their shared dreams and the paths they’ve taken. In the end, Dmitry and his companions, including Galya, return to their old Moscow neighborhood, united by their experiences and the memory of Viktor’s integrity and sacrifice.

== Cast ==
- Lyudmila Marchenko as Galya
- Aleksandr Zbruyev as Dima Denisov
- Oleg Dal as Alik
- Andrei Mironov as Yurka
- Oleg Efremov as Viktor Denisov
- Mikhail Nazvanov as Andrei Ivanovich, professor
- Ivan Savkin as Igor Bauman
- Arvo Kruusement as Matti
- Jaan Saul (actor) as Endel
- Sergei Kurilov as Innokentiy Petrov
- Villu Tomingas as Gustav
