= Point, Point, Comma... =

- Russian: Точка, точка, запятая...
- Directed by: Alexander Mitta
- Written by: Alexander Mitta; Mikhail Lvovsky
- Starring: Sergei Danchenko; Mikhail Kozlovsky; Olga Ryzhnikova; Yuri Nikulin; Yevgeni Gerasimov
- Cinematography: Roman Veseler
- Music by: Gennady Gladkov
- Release date: 1972
- Country: Soviet Union
- Language: Russian

Point, Point, Comma... (Russian: Точка, точка, запятая...) is a 1972 Soviet musical comedy film directed by Alexander Mitta.

The film tells about a schoolboy who no one takes seriously until a new student appears in the classroom.

== Plot ==
In Class 8A, there is an ordinary boy named Lyosha Zhiltsov. In the class, everyone considers themselves a "personality," but Lyosha seems unremarkable. One day, a new student, Zhenya Karetnikova, joins the class — a calm, smart, and serious girl. Lyosha becomes friends with her, and through their interactions, he gradually realizes that his troubles stem from his own laziness and unwillingness to improve himself.

Lyosha begins to work on himself, becoming stronger, braver, more diligent, and resourceful. Eventually, he faces a moment where he must demonstrate these new qualities. During a relay race, his class team competes, and Lyosha has to step in for a teammate who is unexpectedly unable to participate. Thanks to Lyosha’s efforts, his team wins the race.

== Cast ==
- Sergei Danchenko as Alyosha Zhiltsov (as Seryozha Danchenko)
- Mikhail Kozlovsky as Volka (as Misha Kozlovsky)
- Olga Ryzhnikova as Zhenya Karetnikova (as Olya Ryzhnikova)
- Yuri Nikulin as Zhiltsov
- Zaza Kikvidze as Vakhtang Turmanidze
- Marina Shcherbova as Galya Lushnikova
- Lyudmila Sukhova as Zinochka Kryuchkova (as Lyuda Sukhova)
- Andrey Vasiliev as Vadim Kostrov
- Yevgeny Perov as Ivan Fyodorovich Prikhodko
- Yevgeni Gerasimov as Sasha
- Vladimir Zamansky as Karetnikov
- Zhanna Prokhorenko as a teacher
- Natalya Seleznyova as a doctor

== Songs ==
Translation	Original title	Transliterated title	Performer
Point, point, comma	«Точка, точка, запятая»	Tochka, tochka, zapyataya	Oleg Anofriev, Gennady Gladkov
A song about two pedestrians	«Песня о двух пешеходах»	Pesnya o dvukh peshekhodakh	Tatyana Daskovskaya, Alexey Levinskiy
Do you know?	«А ты знаешь?»	A ty zhaesh?	Tatyana Daskovskaya, Alexey Levinskiy
Hooligan	«Хулиган»	Huligan	
About Pythagoras, Newton, Edison and progress	«О Пифагоре, Ньютоне, Эдисоне и прогрессе»	O Pifagore, Nytone, Edisone i progresse	Tatyana Daskovskaya
A problem with an unknown	«Задача с неизвестным»	Zadacha s neizvestnyum	Tatyana Daskovskaya
Reprise of a song about two pedestrians	«Реприза песни о двух пешеходах»	Repriza pesni o dvukh peshekhodakh	Tatyana Daskovskaya
Quiet march	«Тихий марш»	Tikhiy marsh	Tatyana Daskovskaya, Alexey Levinskiy
God bless you	«Будьте здоровы»	Bud'te zdorovy	Oleg Anofriev
How wonderful that one day it turns out	«Как чудесно, что однажды получается»	Kak chudesno, chto odnazhdy poluchaetsya	Tatyana Daskovskaya
