= Andrei Mironov (actor) =

Soviet-Russian actor (1941–1987)

- Андрей Миронов
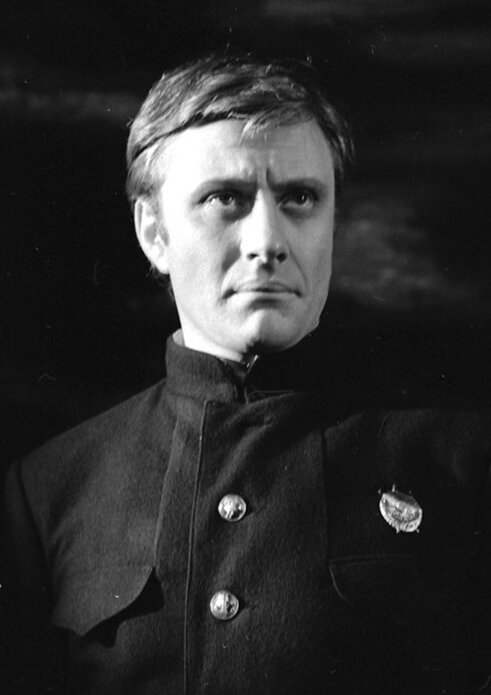
- Born: Andrei Aleksandrovich Menaker; March 7, 1941; Moscow, Russian SFSR, Soviet Union
- Died: August 16, 1987 (aged 46); Riga, Latvian SSR, Soviet Union
- Burial place: Vagankovo Cemetery, Moscow; 55°46′05″N 37°32′54″E
- Occupations: Actor, singer, television presenter
- Years active: 1960–1987
- Spouses: Yekaterina Gradova (m. 1971; div. 1976) Larisa Golubkina (m. 1977)
- Children: Maria Mironova
- Parents: Alexander Menaker (father); Maria Vladimirovna Mironova (mother)
- Website: www.amironov.ru

Signature
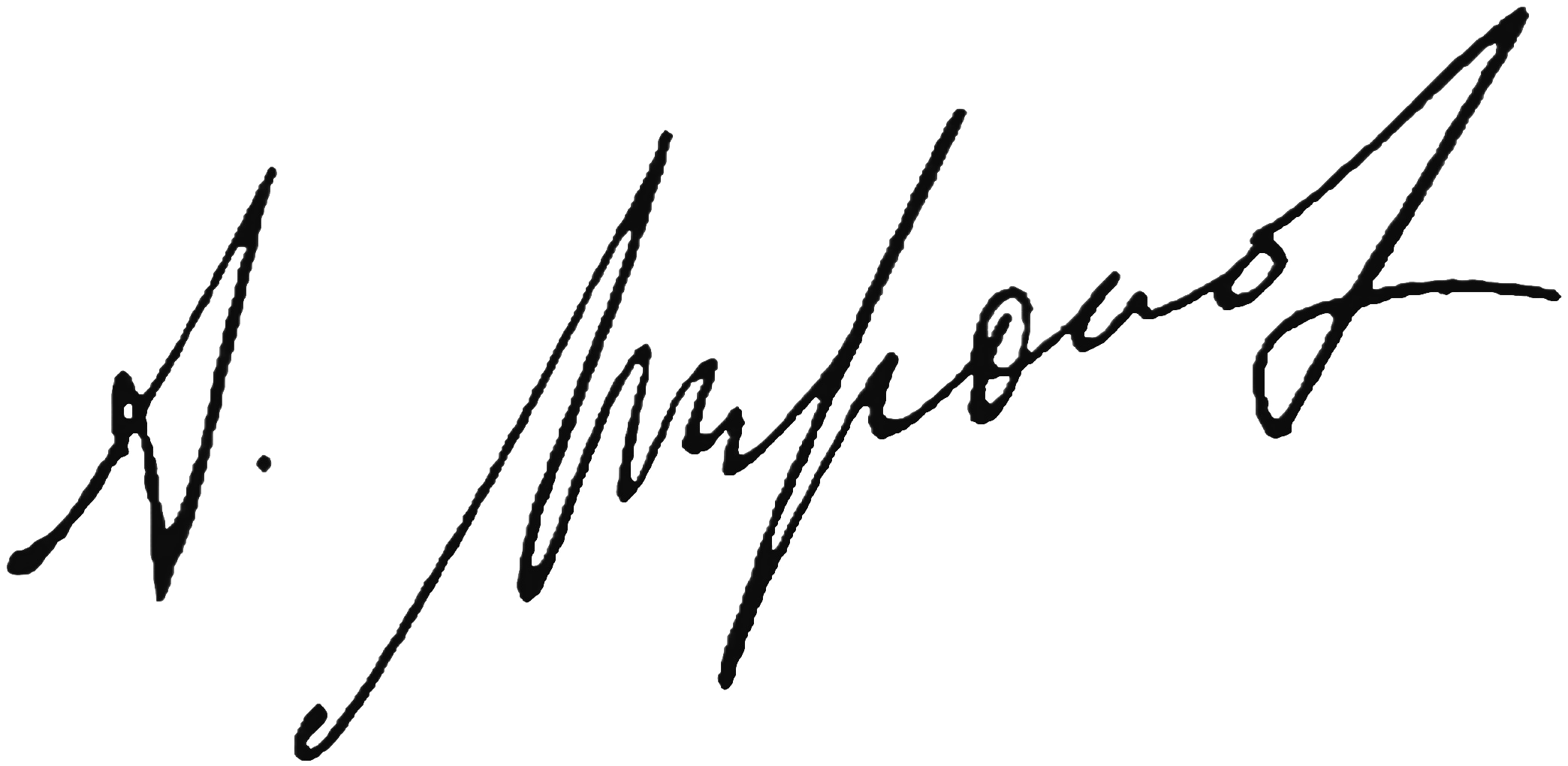

Andrei Aleksandrovich Mironov (Russian: Андрей Александрович Миронов; 7 March 1941 – 16 August 1987) was a Soviet stage and film actor who played lead roles in some of the most popular Soviet films, such as The Diamond Arm, Beware of the Car and Twelve Chairs. Mironov was also a popular singer.

== Early life ==
Mironov was born in Moscow to Maria Vladimirovna Mironova, a Russian, and Aleksandr Menaker, a Russian Jew. His parents were both well-known actors and performed together as the comedy duo "Mironova and Menaker (Миронова и Менакер)".

== Career ==
Mironov studied in the Vakhtangov Theatre School during the early 1950s. From 1958 to 1962, he studied acting at the Moscow Shchukin School. From June 18, 1962, to 1987, Mironov was a permanent member of the trope at the Moscow Theatre of Satire. In 1961, he acted in his first film, What If This Is Love? In 1963, he starred in the comedy Three Plus Two, by Genrikh Oganesyan, and then in the film My Younger Brother by Aleksandr Zarkhi. His real success came with the release of the film Attention, directed by Eldar Ryazanov, in which he played together with Innokenty Smoktunovsky. 1969 marked the release of Leonid Gaidai's film ‘The Diamond Hand’, which became iconic for several generations of Russians and ranked No. 1 in terms of viewership (76.7 million). Mironov played Kozodoyev, the bumbling mate of a hooligan (Anatoly Papanov), opposite Yuri Nikulin, who played a model Soviet citizen. On December 18, 1980, he was awarded the title of People's Artist of the RSFSR. He also received the Medal "For Labour Valour".

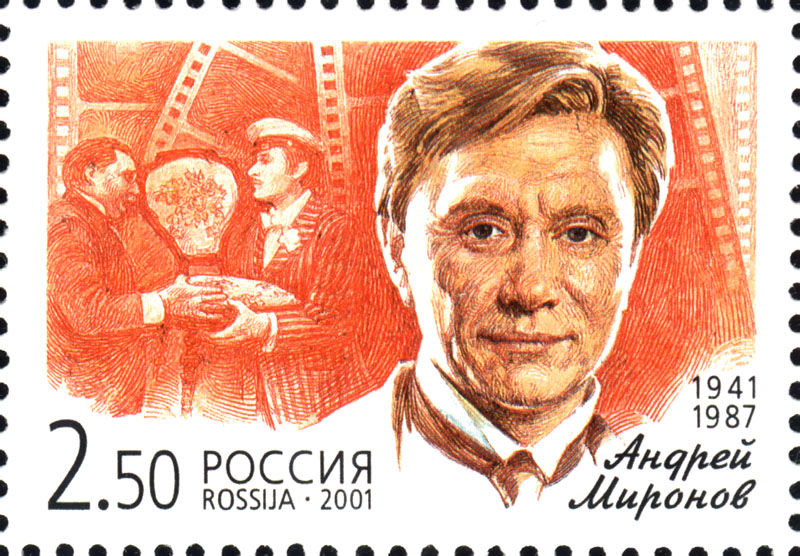
Portrait of Mironov on a postage stamp

Andrei Mironov was known and loved for his roles in films directed by Eldar Ryazanov, Leonid Gaidai, Mark Zakharov, and other filmmakers. He had a wide comedic range and played diverse roles (e.g. a Soviet bureaucrat, Figaro, a romantic spy, a member of the intelligentsia, a con man, an American movie pioneer, a tale-teller, etc.).

On one of his tours through Latvia in 1987, he lost consciousness on stage while performing the lead role in The Marriage of Figaro. Thinking he was having a heart attack, the other actors hastily administered oral nitroglycerin, a drug commonly given to heart attack patients, but which can cause life threatening complications when mistakenly given to those suffering from cerebrovascular disease. He was driven to a hospital where two days later he was pronounced dead. His death occurred only eleven days after the passing of his close friend and frequent co-star Anatoli Papanov.

== Personal life ==
Mironov's parents, Aleksandr Menaker and Maria Vladimirovna Mironova, were known nationwide as a comedic duo. He was married twice, both times to Soviet actresses. First to Yekaterina Gradova, with whom he had one daughter, Maria Mironova, and second to Larisa Golubkina, a singer and actress best known for her role of the hussar maiden in Hussar Ballad. Maria Mironova and his adopted daughter Maria Golubkina (from his marriage to Larisa) had successful careers in Russian cinema. In 2006 Maria Mironova received the title of Honoured Artist of Russia.

== Legacy ==
A minor planet 3624 Mironov, discovered by Soviet astronomers Lyudmila Karachkina and Lyudmila Zhuravleva in 1982, is named after him.

== Partial filmography ==
- What If This Is Love? (1962) as Pyotr
- My Younger Brother (1962) as Yura Popov
- Three Plus Two (Три плюс два, 1962) as Roman
- Two Sundays (1963) as Journalist (uncredited)
- A year like a life (1966) as Friedrich Engels
- Beware of the Car (Берегись автомобиля, 1966) as Dima Semitsvetov
- The Mysterious Wall (1967) as Valya
- The Literature Lesson (1968)
- To Love (1968, TV Movie) as Anton
- The Diamond Arm (Бриллиантовая рука, 1968) as Gennadiy Kozodoyev
- Lyubit... (1969)
- Family Happiness (1970) as Fyodor Sigaev
- Umeyete li vy zhit? (1970) as Attendant (uncredited)
- Dve ulybki (1970)
- Derzhis za oblaka (1971) as Tukman tábornok
- The Shadow (1971) as Caesar Borgia, journalist, man eater
- The Kid and Carlson, who lives on the roof (1971, TV Movie) as Rulle
- Property of the Republic (Достояние республики, 1972) as Shilovsky aka Marquis
- Grandads-Robbers (Старики-разбойники, 1972) as Yury Proskudin
- Unbelievable Adventures of Italians in Russia (Невероятные приключения итальянцев в России, 1974) as Andrei Vasiliev
- Starye steny (1974) as Arkadiy Nikolayevich
- Mad Day or the Marriage of Figaro (1974, TV Movie) as Figaro
- The Straw Hat (Соломенная шляпка, 1974, TV Mini-Series) as Leonidas Fadinar
- Small comedies of the big house (1974, TV Movie) as Husband (segment 2)
- Lev Gurych Sinichkin (1974, TV Movie)
- Repeated Wedding (1975, TV Movie) as Boris Andreyevich Vyazovnin
- Pages of the Pechorin's diary (1975, TV Movie)
- Step forward (1976) as Markel
- Povtornaya svadba (1976) as Ilya Fyodorovich
- Blue Puppy (Голубой щенок, 1976, Short) as Black Cat (voice)
- Heavenly Swallows (1976) as Célestin / Floridor
- The Twelve Chairs (12 стульев, 1976, TV Mini-Series) as Ostap Bender
- An Ordinary Miracle (Обыкновенное чудо, 1978, TV Movie) as Minister Administrator
- Three Men in a Boat (1979, TV Movie) as Jerome K. Jerome
- Rikki-Tikki-Tavi (1979) (voice)
- Appointment (1980, TV Series)
- Say a Word for the Poor Hussar (О бедном гусаре замолвите слово…, 1980) as Narrator (voice)
- Krakh operatsii Terror (1981)
- Once Cowboy, two Cowboy (Раз ковбой, два ковбой, Raz kovboy, dva kovboy) (1981, cartoon) (voice)
- Be my husband (Будьте моим мужем, 1982) as Victor
- Faratyev's Fantasies (1982, TV Movie) as Faryatyev
- Revisor (Inspector) (1982, TV Movie) as Khlestakov
- The Story of Voyages (Сказка странствий, 1982) as Orlando
- Somewhere in Provincial Garden (1983, TV Movie)
- The Blonde Around the Corner (Блондинка за углом, 1984) as Nikolay Gavrilovich Poryvaev
- Victory (1984)
- My Friend Ivan Lapshin (Мой друг Иван Лапшин, 1984) as Khanin
- Pobeda (1985) as Charles Bright
- A Man from the Boulevard des Capucines (Человек с бульвара Капуцинов, 1987) as Johnny First
- The Pathfinder (1987) as Sanglis
- //Revenge of Leopold Cat// (1975) Cat Leopold / White Mouse / Grey Mouse / Doctor
