= Pevitsa i muzykant =

Studio album by Larisa Dolina
- Released: 25 January 1999
- Recorded: 1999
- Studio: Olimp-Studiya, Moscow; Gala Records Studio, Moscow
- Genre: Pop
- Length: 66:02
- Language: Russian; English
- Label: LD Studio
- Producer: Ilya Spitsin

Larisa Dolina chronology
Schastlivaya dolya (1998)	Pevitsa i muzykant (1999)	Epigraf (2000)

Pevitsa i muzykant (Russian: Певица и музыкант; transl. Singer and Musician) is the tenth a studio album by Russian singer Larisa Dolina, released in 1999 by her own label LD Studio.

== Overview ==
The concert program "Singer and Musician", which premiered in 1998, was dedicated to the album: Dolina visited the cities of Russia, Ukraine, the Baltic States and Israel. The singer held five sold-out concerts at the "Rossiya" Concert Hall in Moscow. In June 1999, the singer performed a program in the United States, in Chicago, Los Angeles, Philadelphia, Boston, San Francisco, Seattle, and New York, the concert was held at the famous Madison Square Garden Hall, which was attended by 5,600 spectators.

Video clips were shot for the songs "Stena" and "Tri rozy".

The song "Sluchayny prokhozhy" became the winner of the Stopudovy Khit Award and the Song of the Year festival.

== Critical reception ==
Professional ratings
Review scores
Source	Rating
Zhivoy zvuk	2/5 stars

Ilya Kormiltsev wrote in a review for the newspaper Zhivoy zvuk: "Still, when they sing very average songs in a good voice, it doesn't make anyone feel better. A good voice and repertoire need an appropriate one... There's Sinatra–he sang in the same style all his life, but there's nothing to complain about... the voice! And then there's some kind of inconsistency. The voice? Yes, Dolina has it, everyone will tell you that–but on this CD... There is a beautiful-looking, very thin Dolina–there is no voice. There is a potpourri with the proud title "World hits of the XX century": you can hear such an arrangement and performance plan in any good restaurant–the selection of things will be the same, but you will get more pleasure."

== Track listing ==
1. "Pevitsa i muzykant" (Sergey Sokolkin, Vadim Lotkin) – 3:10
2. "Grustnaya istoriya" (Vladimir Baranov, Oleg Ladov) – 4:02
3. "Vyuga" (Sokolkin, Lotkin) – 4:08
4. "Pervoye svidaniye" (Mikhail Tanich, Oleg Molchanov) – 4:01
5. "Okoltsovannaya ptitsa" (Natalya Shemyatenkova, Ruslan Gorobets) – 4:43
6. "Zerkalo dushi" (Boris Rodin, Sergey Kastorsky) – 4:08
7. "Ukraina" (Vadim Lotkin) – 3:34
8. "Slyozy katyatsya" (Anatoly Poperechny, Igor Mateta) – 3:40
9. "Sluchayny prokhozhy" (Baranov, Ladov) – 4:01
10. "Romans" (Tanich, Gorobets) – 3:24
11. "Tri rozy" (Sokolkin, Lotkin) – 3:02
12. "Stena" (Tanich, Arkady Ukupnik) – 4:14
13. "Popurri (Mirovyye khity XX veka)" – 20:09
  - "Venus" (Robbie van Leeuwen)
  - "Proud Mary" (John Fogerty)
  - "I Just Called to Say I Love You" (Stevie Wonder)
  - "Killing Me Softly with His Song" (Charles Fox, Norman Gimbel)
  - "Fragile" (Sting)
  - "Delilah" (Les Reed, Barry Mason)
  - "Hotel California" (Don Felder, Don Henley, Glenn Frey)
  - "(I Can't Get No) Satisfaction" (Mick Jagger, Keith Richards)
  - "Get Back" (John Lennon, Paul McCartney)
  - "When a Man Loves a Woman" (Calvin Lewis, Andrew Wright)

== Personnel ==
- Vocals – Larisa Dolina
- Arrangement – Andrey Miansarov, Vadim Lotkin, Nikolai Shamshin, Oleg Ladov, Ruslan Gorobets, Sasha Bely, Sergey Rudnitsky
- Backing vocals – Veronika Danilova, Valeria Makovey
- Sound engineer – Valery Tamanov, Vsevolod Ustinov, Yuri Bogdanov
- Guitar – Valery Dolgin, Vladimir Belokhvostov, Dmitry Chetvergov
- Design – Olga Alisova
- Producer – Ilya Spitsin
- Co–producer – Konstantin Akimov
- Saxophone – Sergey Ovchinnikov
- Photo – Ruslan Roshchupkin

Credits are adapted from the album's liner notes.
