= The Bremen Town Musicians (1969 film) =

- Directed by: Inessa Kovalevskaya
- Written by: Yuri Entin; Vasily Livanov
- Starring: Oleg Anofriyev; Elmira Zherzdeva; Anatoly Gorokhov
- Music by: Gennady Gladkov
- Production company: Soyuzmultfilm
- Release date: April 10, 1969
- Running time: 20 minutes
- Country: Soviet Union
- Language: Russian

The Bremen Town Musicians (Russian: Бременские музыканты, romanized: Bremenskiye muzykanty) is a 1969 Soviet musical animated short film produced by Soyuzmultfilm, directed by Inessa Kovalevskaya and written by Yuri Entin and Vasily Livanov, with music by Gennady Gladkov. It is based on the characters of Brothers Grimm fairy-tale, "Town Musicians of Bremen". The film became a cult hit in the Soviet Union because of its memorable musical soundtrack, which contains influences from Western rock and roll music. Two sequels were made, On the Trail of the Bremen Town Musicians (1973) and The New Bremen Town Musicians (2000).

== Plot ==
The cartoon focuses on a Donkey, a Dog, a Cat, and a Rooster and their leader, a Troubadour (possibly to represent a classical five-piece rock-band) dressed as hippie. At the start of the cartoon, the band sings about the joy of freedom, which they feel in their travels. They arrive in a palace and begin a show for the King and his subjects. They perform a variety of tricks, but while the Troubadour is balancing upside-down on top of his animals, he and the Princess catch each other's eye; they both blush. The unexpected event derails the show, causing Donkey to shatter a window. The King furiously throws the band out of the palace and into the woods.

Back on the road, Troubadour looks up at the moonlit sky and dreams of the Princess, seeing her face in the Moon. As he sings, it is revealed that the Princess, too, is gazing at the Moon thinking of him. Their translucent figures share a duet in the sky. Afterwards, they each sing, pulling the Moon their way; it tilts to and fro until at last it is at its highest point in the sky.

Presumably at midnight, the band chances upon a stone hut housing a band of bandits. Their leader is a fortune teller with golden bracelets, heavy makeup, and a long black ponytail - likely a stereotype of Romani people. Shuffling a deck of playing cards, she sings about her desire to rob the king. The other thugs (cartoon rendering of the popular comedy trio Coward, Fool, and Pro), merrily join the song, drinking foaming mugs of beer and dancing together as they sing along. The woman dances atop her drum as the song speeds up into a ragtime, with a vision of fire behind her. Meanwhile, the thugs engage in a sword dance. She swooshes her shawl and shimmies her shoulders, laughing maniacally as the song concludes. Suddenly, the music stops as they are interrupted by Troubadour and the animals. They frighten the thugs with strange noises and a trenchcoat-like disguise. The thugs scramble out of the windows in fear, and the musicians take possession of the hut.

The next day, the King and his military escort are marching to a classified location when their road is blocked by Troubadour and his companions disguised as thugs; they sing a song about being bandits. The group chases off the cowardly soldiers and capture the King, tying him to a post and running into his hut. The King trembles with fear, having a vision of knives slicing against each other. Unable to escape, the King sinks down in despair.

Troubadour then comes out of the hut as his regular self and plays a song on his guitar about how he would do anything for the King, especially if he could marry the King's daughter. The King notices the Troubadour and desperately gestures to be saved. Troubadour immediately runs into the hut and the house trembles as he appears to beat up the bandits within (in reality, he and his band are simply doing cartwheels and jumping jacks while throwing laundry out windows). At last the King is untied by the Troubadour's band, and thereby winning the King's favor.

With the King rescued, the musicians lead a procession back to the palace. The guards attempt to reconcile with the King to no avail. The King formally introduces Troubadour to the Princess, implying they are to be wed. That night, the King throws a ball, where Troubadour and the Princess dance in modern ways that energize the other guests. Meanwhile, the animals are not allowed in the palace; they are forced to spend the night outside, unsuccessfully attempting to peer in through windows.

In the morning, the Rooster calls for Troubadour multiple times, sounding dejected towards the end. Hearing no answer, the animals pack up their things and leave the palace, beginning a solemn rendition of the song they sang in the opening. To their surprise, one of the verses is sung by outside voices: Troubadour and the Princess. Now reunited, Troubadour, the princess, and the animals set off into the unknown.

== Voice actors ==
- Oleg Anofriyev - Troubadour, the Robbers and their lady ataman, the King, the guards, the guardsman with a cannon
- Elmira Zherzdeva - Princess
- Anatoly Gorokhov - the Rooster, the Dog, the Cat, The Donkey, the Robbers, and the guards
- Gennady Gladkov - additional vocals

== Production ==
According to Inessa Kovalevskaya, "The Creative Team was horrified by this fairy tale. I mean, what kind of plot is this: four retired animals roam the world, meet robbers, scare them and settle in their house?! But it hasn't been filmed yet, and the heroes were musicians! Therefore, we decided to work on this material after all." Vasily Livanov introduced the new characters - the Troubadour and the King. Composer Gladkov, in turn, noted that love is needed in a fairy tale - this is how the Princess' character was approved. The new characters became the main ones, the plot was revolved around them.

First, the soundtrack of the cartoon was recorded, and then the characters were drawn. Oleg Anofriyev, Zinovy Gerdt and the "Accord" vocal quartet were invited. However, for a number of reasons, only Anofriyev came to the first record session (only to inform that he could not record due to the high temperature). Nevertheless, it was decided to cope on their own and, in addition to Anofriyev, invite friends to the studio - poet Anatoly Gorokhov and singer Elmira Zherzdeva. Gennady Gladkov also sang in the cartoon: in the general chorus and in the song of the guards. When Anofriyev asked Kovalevskaya what kind of Atamansha she wanted to hear, she replied, "Well, something like Faina Ranevskaya!" Anofriyev sang like that. He recalled: "When we finished work in the morning, I took my temperature, but it turned out to be normal. This is the great power of art!"

The Princess was "put on" the wedding dress of Yuri Entin's wife. The robbers were copied from the most popular characters in the Soviet Union: Coward, Fool, and Pro (created by Y. Nikulin, G. Vitsin and E. Morgunov, especially from their images in "Kidnapping, Caucasian Style")

== Soundtrack ==
The music and songs from the cartoon have been repeatedly published. The original vinyl release included narrator and was made in fairy tale format. A 28 million records were sold in the first two years.

In 2024, Shining Sioux Records released all music from both "The Bremen Town Musicians" and "On the Trail of the Bremen Town Musicians" in multiple formats; tracks were carefully restored including previously unreleased track "Abracadabra".

== Legacy ==
In 2012, "The Bremen Town Musicians" vinyl release took 3rd place in the list of the 50 best albums of the "Melodiya" and anniversary vinyl edition was released. It was also included in a similar list by "Silver Rain Radio".

== See also ==
- History of Russian animation
