= Ruslan Gorobets =

Russian composer (born 1956)

- Born: Ruslan Borisovich Gorobets; June 19, 1956; Boyarka, USSR
- Died: April 25, 2014 (aged 57); Boyarka, Ukraine
- Occupations: composer, singer, arrangement

Ruslan Borisovich Gorobets (Russian: Руслан Борисович Горобец; 19 June 1956 – 25 April 2014), was a Russian music composer, singer and arranger. Meritorious Artist of Russia (1994).

== Biography ==
Ruslan Gorobets was born into a musical family in the town of Boyarka Kiev Oblast in 1956. He played in musical groups: "Red Poppies", "Carnival", "Recital". His music influenced work of Beethoven, Tchaikovsky, Stevie Wonder, Sting. He has worked with the Estonian singer Jaak Joala.

Since 1983, at the invitation of Alla Pugacheva 14 years he worked in the "Recital" group. Working with Pugacheva, he was the conductor and arranger for the musical program has come and say, I took part in its numerous "Christmas Meetings".

As a composer has collaborated with poets such as Mikhail Tanich, Pavel Zhagun. Songs performed by Ruslan Gorobets: Alla Pugacheva, Valery Leontiev, Aleksey Glyzin, Alexander Barykin, Anne Veski, Mikhail Boyarsky and many other artists. Particularly popular to Gorobets brought songs on poems by Mikhail Tanich by Larisa Dolina, with whom he recorded the 1997 album "Weather In the House".

He died at 8 hours and 30 minutes in the morning April 25, 2014, allegedly because of the separated blood clot in Boyarka, where he was buried.

== Popular songs ==
- Airport (Аэропорт) by Alexander Barykin
- Weather in the House (Погода в доме) by Larisa Dolina
- I Give You Moscow (Дарю тебе Москву) by Larisa Dolina
- I'm Offended (Обижаюсь) by Larisa Dolina
- Time Flies (Время мчится) by Jaak Joala
- Don't Regret Anything (Ни о чём не жалей) by Red Poppies
- Have Fun (Разгуляй) by Olga Zarubina
- It's Snowing (Падает снег) by Ruslan Gorobets
- Violetta (Виолетта) by Ruslan Gorobets
- Samba with Maradona (Самба с Марадоной) by Anne Veski
- Homeless Love (Бездомная любовь) by Valery Leontiev
- Silver Music (Серебряная музыка) by Valery Leontiev
- Do Not Forget Me (Ты меня не забывай) by Valery Leontiev
