= Elmira Zherzdeva =

Elmira Sergeyevna Zherzdeva (Russian: Эльмира Сергеевна Жерздева; 6 March 1936 – 18 May 2023) was a Soviet and Russian singer and Meritorious Artist (since 1992).

== Early life and career ==
Zherzdeva was born in Bolokhovo, Soviet Union. After finishing school, she entered the music academy at the Moscow Conservatory. In 1958, she worked at an opera choir on the Vsesoyuznoye Radio (All-Union Radio), and then in the philharmonic department Mosconcert as a vocalist. In 1962, she started to work in the variety department of Mosconcert. She was well known for singing old romance classics throughout the nation. Her one and only notable voice acting role was the role of the princess in The Bremen Town Musicians and On the Trail of the Bremen Town Musicians. Her lesser known repertoire consists of Property of the Republic.
