= Carnival of Jazz =

Live album by Larisa Dolina and Igor Butman's Big Band
- Released: December 2002
- Genre: Jazz
- Length: 132:51
- Label: LD Studio
- Producer: Ilia Spitsin

Larisa Dolina chronology
Po-novomu zhit (2000)	Carnival of Jazz (2002)	Ostrova ljubvi (2003)

Igor Butman chronology
Once In Summer Weekend (2002)	Carnival of Jazz (2002)	Prophecy (2003)

Carnival of Jazz is a 2002 double live album by Russian singer Larisa Dolina, recorded with the participation of saxophonist Igor Butman and his big band.

== Overview ==
For Larisa Dolina, this was the first purely jazz concert program in the last seventeen years. Its premiere took place on April 27 at the Moscow concert hall "Russia" with a full house. The program featured the most famous jazz standards and world-famous hits in jazz processing. For the concert program "Carnival of Jazz", as well as for outstanding achievements in the field of culture and art, Dolina was nominated for the State Prize in the field of culture and art.

The album was released in December 2002 and included selected numbers recorded during the artists' tours of cities in Russia, the United States, Germany, Israel, Ukraine, Belarus, Latvia. In addition to the CD, the concert was also released on DVD, which also included the rehearsal process of its preparation.

== Critical reception ==
Professional ratings
Review scores
Source	Rating
The Encyclopedia of Popular Music	3/5 stars

Dmitry Bebenin in a review for the website Zvuki.ru stated that such a grand prima as Larisa Dolina, with her gorgeous voice, could not stay away from the revival of normal music, and the restless manic "jazzophrenic" Igor Butman, who in recent years has developed a stormy and fruitful activity in the field of popularization of real noble jazz, turned out to be very welcome here. He positively assessed the issue of standards: "The funky–all innovatively, and without any hints of "popness"—version of the classic "Night and Day" is able to "get out of the game" even Red Hot Chili Peppers. At the same time, the classic "Georgia on My Mind" strictly follows the spirit and letter of the original. It was not without pop and rock inclusions. Stevie Wonder's "Sir Duke" sounds almost more interesting here than the original. In Gershwin's "Summertime" and Ellington's "Don't Get Around Much Anymore", the hero and heroine of the evening are ready to improvise indefinitely. And Dolina and Butman's reading of the Beatles' same blues "Oh, Darling" is performed in the tradition of George Benson, who, as you know, changed everything back in 1976 with a jazz-rock reading of the whole matter of Abbey Road." Summarizing, Bebenin noted that, judging by the chic with which Dolina published this superfood, interest in truly stylish music in our crazy world has not only not died yet, but is ready to flare up with renewed vigor.

== Track listing ==
Disc one
No.	Title	Writer(s)	Length
1.	"Hello, Dolly"	Jerry Herman	2:47
2.	"Putting On the Rits"	Irving Berlin	3:19
3.	"Perdido"	Ervin Drake; Hans Lengsfelder; Juan Tizol	2:59
4.	"Satin Doll"	Billy Strayhorn; Duke Ellington	3:21
5.	"Nice Work, If You Can Get It"	George Gershwin; Ira Gershwin	6:26
6.	"By, By Black Bird"	Miles Davis; Mort Dixon	4:00
7.	"Don't Get Around Much Anymore"	Bob Russell; Ellington	5:31
8.	"God Bless the Child"	Arthur Herzog Jr.; Billie Holiday	5:13
9.	"My Funny Valentine"	Richard Rodgers; Lorenz Hart	6:27
10.	"Lush Life"	Strayhorn; Ellington	4:13
11.	"You Are My Good Old Wagon"	B. Dewey	3:56
12.	"Reverend Lee"	Eugene McDaniels	5:04
13.	"Summertime"	G. Gershwin; I. Gershwin	8:05
Total length:			61:21

Disc two
No.	Title	Writer(s)	Length
1.	"Oh, Darling"	John Lennon; Paul McCartney	3:26
2.	"Masquerade"	Leon Russell	8:17
3.	"Everything Must Change"	Bernard Ighner	6:43
4.	"Night and Day"	Cole Porter	3:18
5.	"Georgia on My Mind"	Hoagy Carmichael; Stuart Gorrell	5:20
6.	"Reverend Lee"	McDaniels	5:20
7.	"Summertime"	G. Gershwin; I. Gershwin	11:44
8.	"C'est si bon"	Henri Betti; André Hornez; Jerry Seelen	4:33
9.	"New York, New York"	John Kander; Fred Ebb	4:14
10.	"Sir Duke"	Stevie Wonder	5:45
11.	"Oh, Darling" (Remix)	Lennon; McCartney	3:44
12.	"Roof Garden"	Al Jarreau	4:31
13.	"Something Worth Fighting For"	Nick Howard; Tommy Faragher	4:35
Total length:			71:30

== Personnel ==
- Larisa Dolina – vocals
- Ilia Spitsin – bass guitar, producer
- Anatoly Kroll, Anton Baronin — keyboards
- Igor Butman, Oleg Grymov – saxophone
- Vladimir Mamyko — trumpet

Credits are adapted from the album's liner notes.
