= Yuri Entin =

Russian poet and writer (born 1935)

- Юрий Энтин
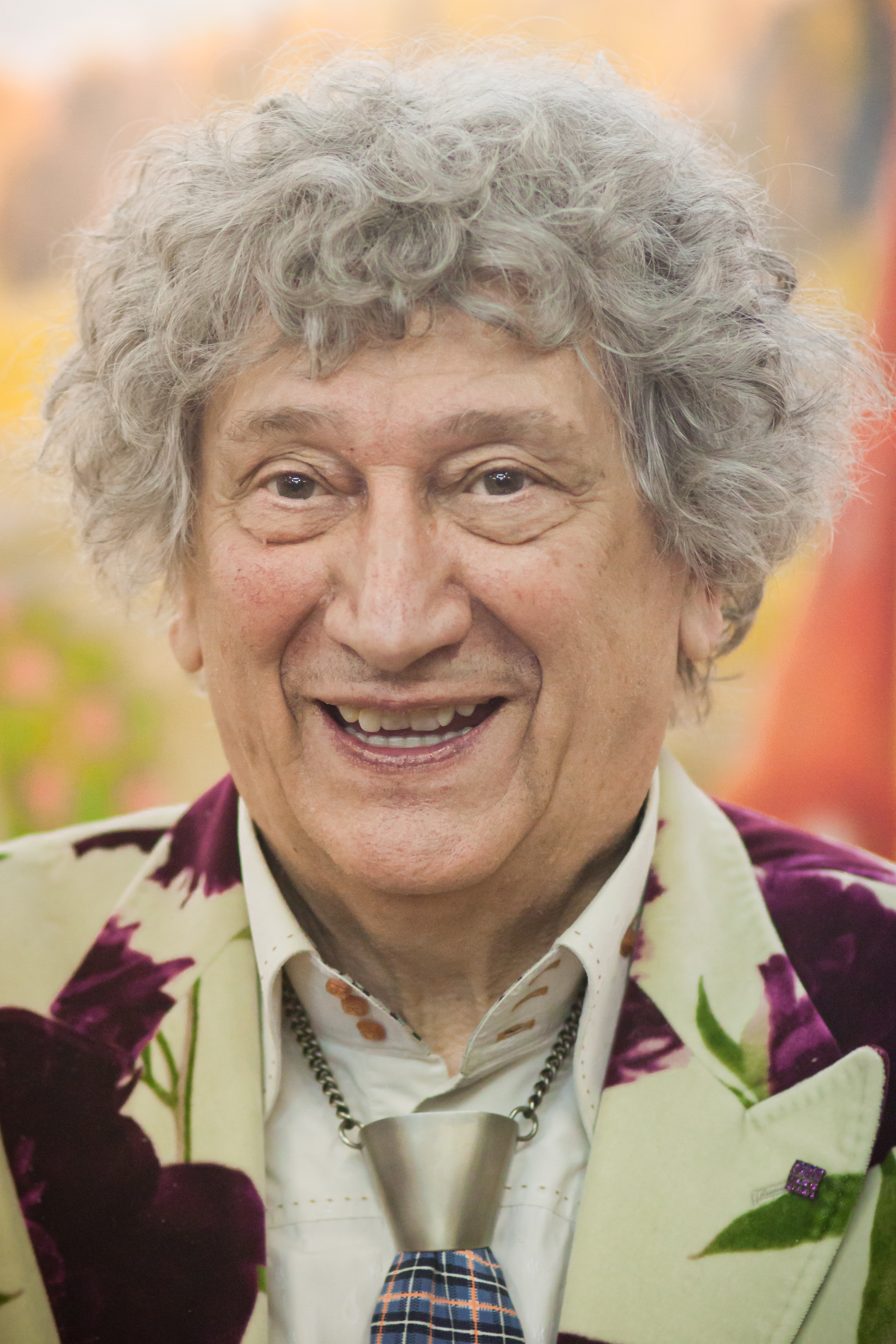
- Entin in 2013
- Born: 21 August 1935 (age 91); Moscow, Russian SFSR, Soviet Union
- Occupations: Poet; playwright; lyricist

Yuri Sergeyevich Entin (Russian: Юрий Сергеевич Энтин; born 21 August 1935) is a Soviet and Russian poet, playwright and lyricist who wrote screenplays and songs for various children's films including The Bremen Town Musicians (1969) and two sequels (with Vasily Livanov) and Blue Puppy (1976), among others. He also wrote music with Bulat Okudzhava for the 1975 film The Adventures of Buratino.

== Biography ==
Entin was born in Moscow to a Jewish family. He was interested in literature and history during his school years. He graduated from the Faculty of History and worked as a teacher and librarian. In 1962 he was the Chief Editor of the children's section of the company "Melody". Since 1969 he has been a freelance artist. He has written songs for film, television, scripts, and books.

Yuri is a member of the Union of Cinematographers of Russia, author of texts for songs (over 500). Songs on his poems sound in a variety of children's and adult movies (more than 100). Has written several books for children.

== Awards ==
- 1998: Golden Ostap Award in the nomination "Humor for children"
- 2007 Korney Chukovsky Prize "for the development of Chukovsky's innovative traditions in modern children’s literature"

== Works ==
Cartoons

- 1967 "Four from one yard" ("Soyuzmultfilm"), music. Gennnady Gladkov
- 1969 "The Bremen Town Musicians" ("Soyuzmultfilm"), music. Gennady Gladkov
- 1969 "Merry Go Round. Issue number 1 " ("Soyuzmultfilm"), music. Vladimir Shainsky
- 1970 "Cutter" ("Soyuzmultfilm"), music. Vladimir Shainsky (song Chunga-Changa )
- 1970 "Beavers are on the trail" ("Soyuzmultfilm"), music. Vladimir Shainsky
- 1970 "Small misunderstandings (Kotick Motik)" ("Screen"), music. Vladimir Shainsky
- 1970 "Malyshok and black mask" ("Screen"), music. Anatoly Bykanov
- 1972 "The Edge, where you live" ("Soyuzmultfilm"), music. Gennady Gladkov
- 1972 "Where do you fly, Vitar?" ("Soyuzmultfilm"), music. Oscar Felzman
- 1973 "Song of Friendship" ("Soyuzmultfilm"), music. Vladimir Shainsky
- 1973 "In the wake of the Bremen Town Musicians" ("Soyuzmultfilm"), music. Gene. Gladkov
- 1973 "Spider Anansi and the Magic Wand" ("Screen"), music. Alexey Rybnikov
- 1973 "Index" ("Soyuzmultfilm"), music. Rybnikov
- 1974 "A Tale for the fairy tale" : "Peter – cheerful deceiver" ("Soyuzmultfilm"), music. Yevgeny Krylatov
- 1974 "Oh, wait!" (Issue 1) ("Soyuzmultfilm"), music. Gene. Gladkov
- 1974 "Katavasov" ("Screen"), music. Yadav
- 1975 "The Wolf and the Seven Little Kids in a new way" ("Screen"), music. Alexey Rybnikov
- 1976 "Blue Puppy" ("Soyuzmultfilm"), music. Gennady Gladkov
- 1979 "The Flying Ship" ("Soyuzmultfilm"), music. Maksim Dunayevsky
- 1980 "Bang bang, oh-oh-oh!" ("Screen"), music. Maksim Dunayevsky
- 1980 "Baba Yaga against!" ("Soyuzmultfilm"), music. Eduard Artemyev
- 1982 "Before we were birds"
- 1984 "Winter in Buttermilk" ("Soyuzmultfilm"), music. Yevgeny Krylatov
- 1984 "Creme Brulee" ("Screen"), music. Vladimir Nazarov
- 1985 – in 1987 "Contact and Conflict", issues number 2, 3 ("Soyuzmultfilm"), music. Pavel Ovsyannikov
- 1989 "The Cage" ("Soyuzmultfilm"), music. Gennady Gladkov
- 1990 "End Gray Wolf Little Red Riding Hood" ("Soyuzmultfilm"), music. Georgy Garanian
- 1992 "Yoksel-Moksel" ("Reneshans") muses. David Tukhmanov
- 1996 "Frog-traveler" ("Animafilm") muses. Yevgeny Krylatov
- 2000 "The New Bremen Town Musicians" ("Kino-Bridge"), music. Gennady Gladkov
- 2002 "Firefly", muses. David Tukhmanov
- 2002 "The New Adventures of Pencil and Tuneup" ("Pro-Class"), music David Tukhmanov
- 2003 "Guilty cloud", muses. David Tuhmanov
- 2004 "Strahodon Shaggy" ("Studio Light"), music. David Tukhmanov
- 2002 – 2004 "Birdie", "Roly-poly", "Aerobics for Bobik", "Beloved Papa", "Brave Bunny", "Guilty cloud", "The Lazy Song" (Studio "Ladybird"), music. David Tukhmanov
- "School with a bias" Moldova-film music. Ostrowska
- "Sesame Street", an animated series, USA, muses Vladimir Shainsky
