= Bremen Town Musicians (sculpture) =

Sculpture by Gerhard Marcks

- Artist: Gerhard Marcks
- Year: 1951
- Type: Bronze
- Dimensions: 200 cm × 140 cm × 30 cm (79 in × 57 in × 12 in)
- Location: Lynden Sculpture Garden, Milwaukee, Wisconsin; 43°10′37.7″N 87°56′15.8″W

Bremen Town Musicians is a public art work by artist Gerhard Marcks located at the Lynden Sculpture Garden near Milwaukee, Wisconsin. The bronze sculpture is based on the fairytale by the Brothers Grimm; it is installed on the garden's lawn.

It is made up of a donkey, dog, cat, and rooster, each stacked on top of each other and smaller than the last. Some notable characteristics of this work are the hump of the cat's back and the minimalist expression of the character's eyes.
