= Hollywood Mood =

Studio album by Larisa Dolina
- Released: 28 April 2008
- Recorded: 2007–2008
- Studio: Le Gonks West, West Hollywood
- Genre: Jazz; blues; latino
- Length: 40:39
- Label: Nikitin
- Producer: George Duke

Larisa Dolina chronology
Obozhzhyonnaya dusha (2006)	Hollywood Mood (2008)	Carnival of Jazz II (2010)

Hollywood Mood is a studio album by Russian singer Larisa Dolina, released on 28 April 2008 by Nikitin. The album is the singer's first English-language release. The producer and songwriter is American musician George Duke.

== Background ==
Larisa Dolina met George Duke and Al Jarreau in 2005, both were invited to perform at the singer's anniversary. A month later, an offer was received from George Duke to record an album. Recording took place in New York and Los Angeles at George Duke Studios. The recording was completed in September 2007, but at the beginning of the following year, Dolina specially came to Los Angeles to re-record some of her parts.

According to Dolina, she wanted to make the most diverse album, so she included compositions of the most different styles there. Duke himself liked the idea and wanted to see how far the singer could go in her performance. All the songs on the album were written by Luke specifically for Dolina.

== Critical reception ==
Professional ratings
Review scores
Source	Rating
InterMedia	3/5 stars
Vzglyad	5/10

According to Natalya Svetlakova from InterMedia, the music of the album is the so-called "smooth jazz". The voice of Dolina, in her opinion, does not quite fit this style, only moments with a scat look good. The critic calls the lyrical ballad "Lately" and the music hall "Waiting on the Rain" the best songs of Hollywood Mood, in which the image of the singer looks most familiar. Guru Ken also gave the album a low rating, noting the vocal enslavement of Dolina, especially in comparison with Al Jarreau. Sergey Sosedov, columnist of the KM.RU, on the contrary, praised the singer's "filigree vocal technique" and excellent English pronunciation, and also suggested that the "record would take its rightful place in the soundtracks of jazz gourmets and just connoisseurs of good music."

== Track listing ==
All tracks are written by George Duke

No.	Title	Length
1.	"In L.A."	4:27
2.	"Waiting on the Rain"	4:43
3.	"Wonder Where You Are?" (featuring Al Jarreau)	5:22
4.	"I Get the Blues"	4:02
5.	"Lost in Brazil"	4:35
6.	"Cold Wind"	3:08
7.	"Dance (Till the Break of Dawn)"	4:31
8.	"Lately"	5:17
9.	"Time Stands Still"	4:34
Total length:		40:39

== Personnel ==
- Larisa Dolina – vocals (all tracks)
- Al Jarreau – vocals (3)
- Dean Parks – acoustic guitar (2)
- Oscar Castro-Neves – acoustic guitar (5)
- Everette Harp – alto saxophone (1, 7, 8)
- Larry Bragg – backing vocals (1)
- George Duke – backing vocals (1), keyboards, production
- Josie James – backing vocals (1, 3, 5, 7, 8)
- Shannon Pearson – backing vocals (2)
- Fred White – backing vocals (5)
- Diana Booker – backing vocals (5)
- Rashid Duke – backing vocals (5)
- Lynne Fiddmont – backing vocals (5)
- Kenya Hathaway – backing vocals (5, 7, 8)
- Chanté Moore – backing vocals (7, 8)
- Kevin Whalum – backing vocals (7, 8)
- Oscar Cartaya – bass (1)
- Christian McBride – bass (2, 4, 5, 7 to 9)
- Dave Carpenter – bass (6)
- Teddy Campbell – drums (2, 4, 7 to 9)
- Oscar Seaton – drums (3, 6)
- Airto Moreira – drums (5), percussion (5)
- Michael Landau – electric guitar (1, 2, 9)
- Kenny Burrell – electric guitar (4)
- Paul Jackson Jr. – electric guitar (7, 8)
- Randy Brecker – flugelhorn (8)
- Robert Hadley – mastering
- Erik Zobler – mixing, sound engineering
- Daniel Higgins – tenor saxophone (1, 7, 8)
- James Moody – tenor saxophone (4)
- Bill Reichenbach – trombone (1, 7, 8)
- Terence Blanchard – trumpet (1)
- Gary Grant – trumpet (1, 7, 8)
- Michael Stewart – trumpet (5)
- Dan Fornero – trumpet (7, 8)

Credits are adapted from the album's liner notes.
