= Bolshoye Boldino =

Rural locality in Nizhny Novgorod Oblast, Russia

Coordinates: 55°00′12″N 45°18′39″E

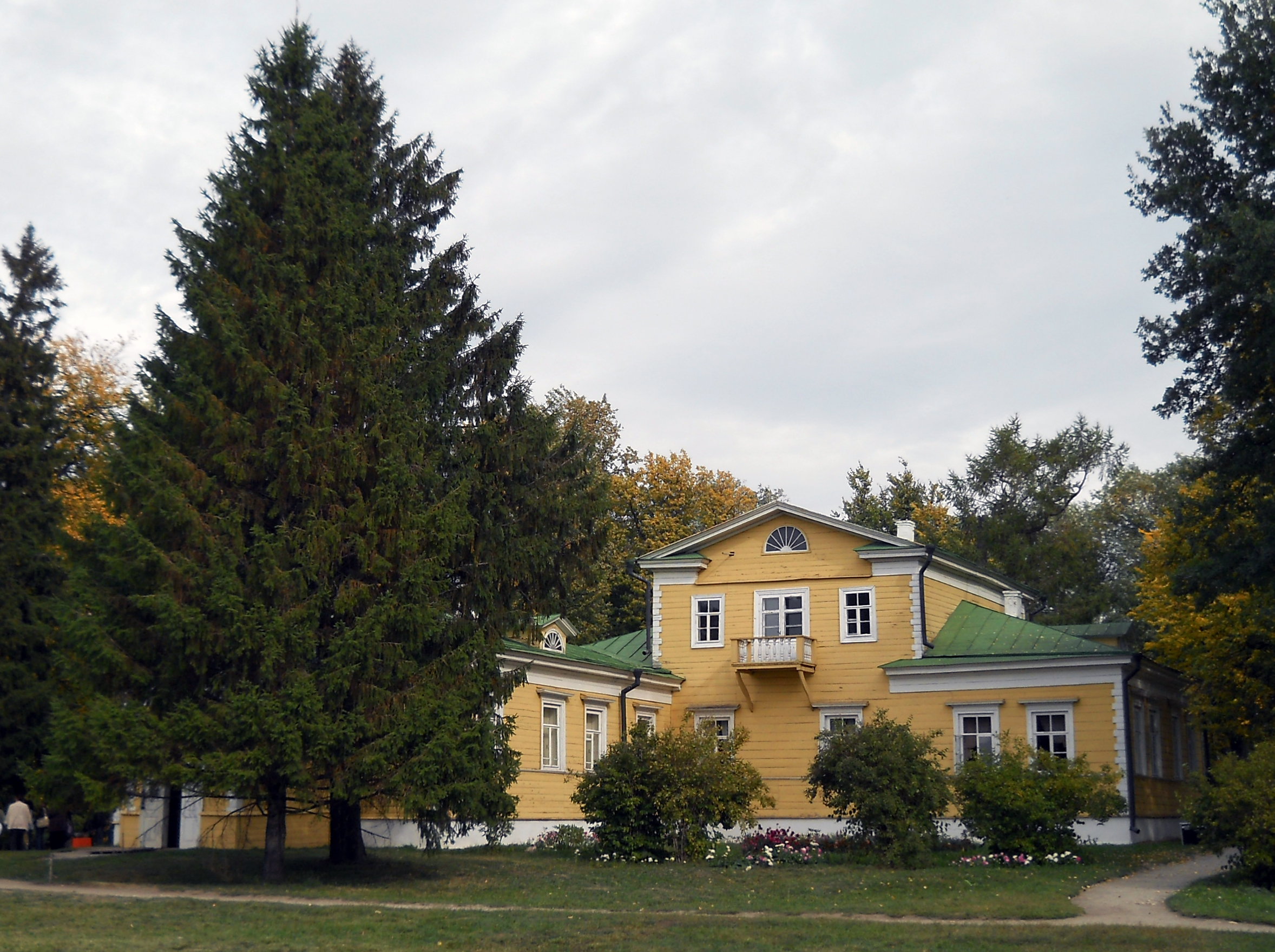
Pushkins' Family manor in Bolshoye Boldino

Bolshoye Boldino (Russian: Большо́е Бо́лдино) is a rural locality (a selo) and the administrative center of Bolsheboldinsky District, Nizhny Novgorod Oblast, Russia. Population: 5,074 (2010 census); 4,919 (2002 census); 4,432 (1989 Soviet census).
