= Larisa Dolina =

Russian singer (born 1955)

- Лариса Долина
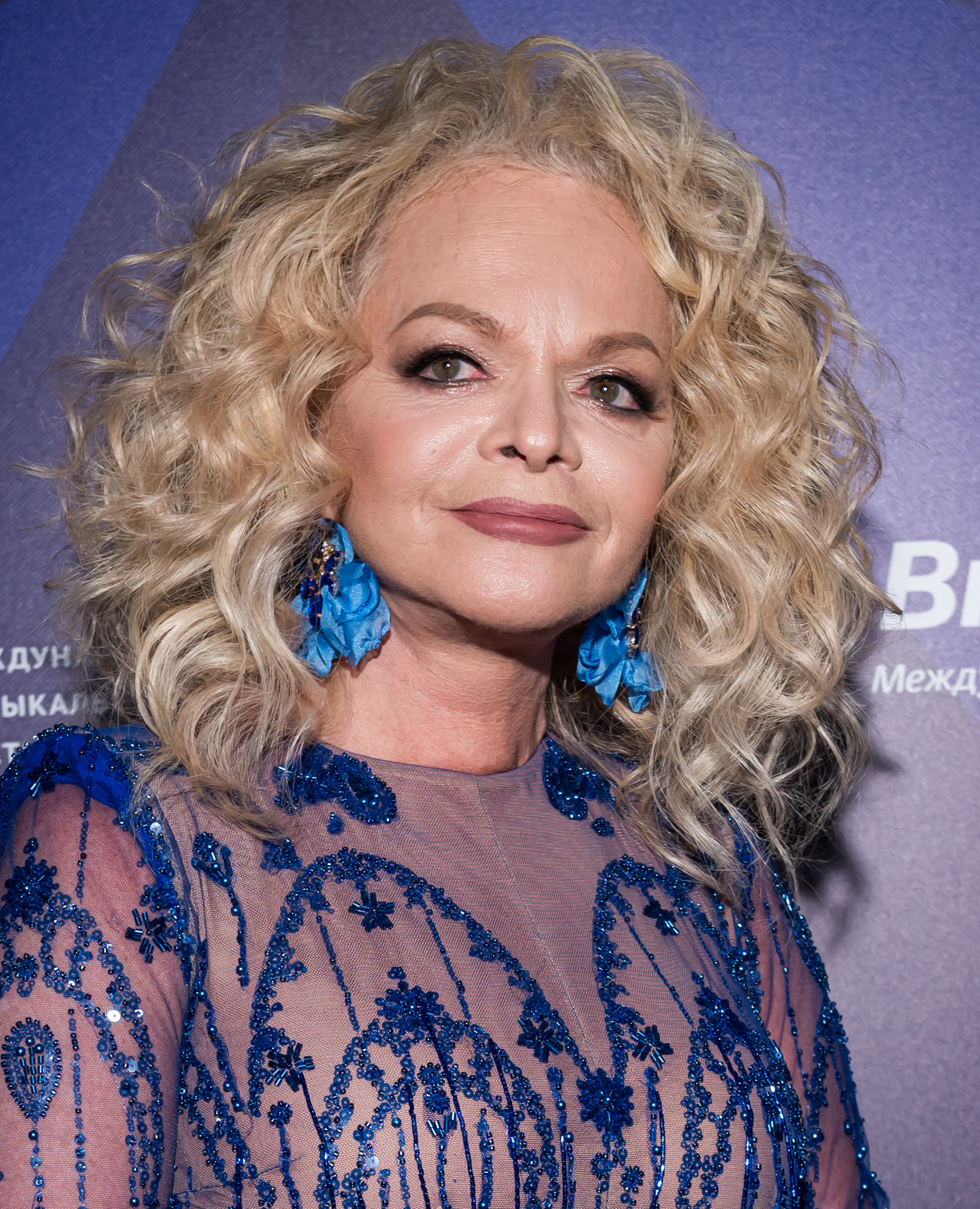
- Dolina at the White Nights Festival in 2024
- Born: Larisa Aleksandrovna Kudelman; 10 September 1955 (age 71); Baku, Azerbaijani SSR, Soviet Union
- Occupations: Singer; actress
- Years active: 1971–present
- Title: People's Artist of Russia (1998)
- Political party: United Russia
- Spouses: Anatoly Mionchinsky (m. 1980; div. 1987) Victor Mityazov (m. 1987; div. 1998) Ilya Spitsin (m. 1998; div. 2016)
- Children: 1
- Awards: Order of Honour (2005)
- Musical career
- Genres: Pop; jazz; estrada
- Instruments: Piano; dombra
- Labels: Melodiya; LD Studio; Nikitin; Dzhem

Signature
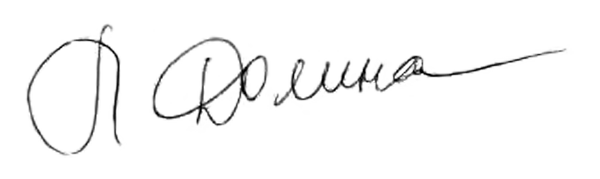

Larisa Aleksandrovna Dolina (Russian: Лариса Александровна Долина, IPA: [ɫɐˈrʲisə ˈdolʲinə]; née Kudelman [Кудельман]; formerly Mionchinskaya [Миончинская]; born 10 September 1955) is a Russian jazz and pop singer and actress. She was awarded the Order of Honour in 2005.

== Biography ==
Dolina was born on 10 September 1955 in Baku, in the Azerbaijani SSR of the Soviet Union. Her parents were Ashkenazi Jews, originally from Odessa. Her father, Aleksandr Markovich Kudelman, was a construction worker, and her mother, Galina Izrailevna Kudelman (née Dolina), was a seamstress. When Dolina was three, the family moved to Odessa. At age six, she began attending a music school where she studied the cello.

Dolina's musical career began in 1971 in the performance group My Odessity ('We are Odessites'). She then worked as lead singer for the State Performing Orchestra of Armenia, the State Performing Orchestra of Azerbaijan, and the performing group Sovremennik ('Contemporary'). In 1981, Dolina performed together with Weyland Rodd as part of the "Anthology of jazz vocals" tour.

In 1982, Dolina performed the hit "Tri belyh konya" ('Three White Horses') for the soundtrack of the film Charodei ('Magicians'). In 1984, she sang in the musical "Istoriya doktora Fausta" ('Story of Doctor Faust').

Dolina began a solo career in 1985, working with the Leningrad based composer Viktor Reznikov. She began to produce her own concert shows, including "Zatyazhnoy Pryzhok" ('Long Jump'), "Kontrasty" ('Contrasts'), "L'dinka" ('Little Icicle'), and "Malen'kaya Zhenschina" ('Little Woman'). In 1990, Dolina played the lead role in the rock opera "Giordano" opposite Valery Leontiev.

In 1991, Dolina performed in front of 20,000 people at the festival Radio Prestige in La Rochelle, France. The same year, she was awarded the prize of "Best female singer" at "Profi", a Russian national competition. In 1993, she became an Honored Artist of Russia. In 1994, she won the "Crystal dolphin" prize at the all-Russian competition in Yalta and also won the national musical award "Ovation" after being nominated in the "best female rock singer" category. In 1995, she created a new concert program called "Ya ne nravlus' sebye" ('I don't like myself') and toured in Baku, Almaty, Kyiv, Yerevan, Minsk, Riga, Kishinev, and Jerusalem, as well as a number of cities in Europe and the United States. In 1996, she won the "Ovation" award again, this time in the "best female pop singer" category.

Dolina appeared as an actress in the films "Barkhatniy sezon" ('Velvet Season'), "My iz dzhaza" ('We are from the jazz), "Ostrov pogibshih korabley" (Island of sunken ships), and "Suvenir dlia prokurora" ('A Souvenir for the Prosecutor'). Her songs have been featured in more than 70 live action and animated films.

In 2007, Dolina performed several George Gershwin compositions at the Gershwin Gala at the Tchaikovsky Conservatory in Moscow. In 2010, she played multiple roles, including the lead, in the musical "Lyubov and shpionazh" (Love and espionage), which was written specifically for the singer.

During 2004, Dolina performed live at the Kostya Tszyu-Sharmba Mitchell boxing rematch in Phoenix, Arizona, United States.

In February 2011, Dolina performed "Summertime" and "Wonder Where You Are" at a concert at Crocus City Hall dedicated to the songs of jazz legend Al Jarreau. Both songs were part of Dolina's new album titled "Hollywood Mood". She followed that up with a rendition of "Private Dancer" by Tina Turner at the "Novaya Volna" (New Wave) competition in July 2011. Later in the year, Dolina unveiled a new concert program titled "Sny extraverta" (Dreams of an extrovert) in Kirov. She spent much of 2012 touring with the new concert and reprising her role in the musical "Lyubov and shpionazh".

In February 2012, Dolina was tapped to perform the national anthems of both Russia and Canada at a televised hockey game in Red Square commemorating the 40-year anniversary of the 1972 hockey rivalry between the two countries. Later that year, Dolina toured the United States, giving concerts in Boston, Las Vegas, and New York City.

== Personal life ==
- First husband – Anatoly Mionchinsky (1980–1987)
- Second husband – Victor Mityazov (1987–1998)
- Third husband – Ilya Spitsin (1998–2016)
- Daughter – Angelina Mionchinskaya (b. 1983)
- Granddaughter – Alexandra (b. 28 September 2011)

=== Botched apartment sale ===
In 2024 Dolina fell for a scam and gave away the money she received from an innocent buyer, and when the singer realised the mistake, she sued to recover her property. In fraud cases like this one, Russian courts often granted the recovery motion but would not order the money back. This left the buyer with neither property nor money even if the buyer was honest. This outcome highlighted criminals' abuse of the Civil Code of Russia to fraudulently dispossess property buyers with the sanction of Russian courts, which are favourable to sellers. Consequently, Russian mass media coined the term "Dolina scheme" (Russian: схема Долиной).

On December 16, 2025, the Supreme Court of Russia returned the apartment to the buyer Polina Lurie.

=== Political views ===
In 2003, Dolina joined the United Russia political party.

Dolina supported the 2022 Russian invasion of Ukraine, and the Presidential Administration of Russia put her on the list of singers who were recommended to be invited to state-sponsored events. In January 2023, Ukraine imposed sanctions on Dolina. In February, Canada sanctioned her.

== Discography ==
Studio albums

- Zatyazhnoy pryzhok (1986)
- Kartochny domik (with Mikhail Boyarsky and Viktor Reznikov; 1988)
- Novy den (1989)
- Prosti menya (1993)
- Privykay k Larise Dolinoy (1994)
- Dolina v doline strastey (1995)
- "Proshchay"... Net "Do svidaniya" (1996)
- Pogoda v dome (1997)
- Schastlivaya dolya (1998)
- Pevitsa i muzykant (1999)
- Epigraf (2000)
- Po-novomu zhit (2000)
- Carnival of Jazz (2002)
- Ostrova ljubvi (2003)
- Ottepel (2004)
- Obozhzhyonnaya dusha (2006)
- Hollywood Mood (2008)
- Carnival of Jazz-2 (2009)
- Route 55 (2010)
- Larisa (2012)
- Snimem maski, gospoda (2015)
- Bud so mnoy (2025)

== Filmography ==
- An Ordinary Miracle (1978) as Emilia in duo with Leonid Serebrennikov as the Innkeeper
- Very Blue Beard (1979)
- Charodei (Magicians) (1982) as Nina Pukhova (vocal, uncredited)
- We Are from Jazz (1983) as Clementine Fernandez
- Coordinates of Death (1985) performed theme song The land of Vietnamese
- Chelovek s bulvara Kaputsinov (A Man from the Boulevard des Capuchines) (1987) – voice of Diana Little
- Island of Lost Ships (1987)
- Starye pesni o glavnom (Old Songs of the Main Things) (1996) as Manager of a local store
- Klubnichka (Cafe Strawberry) (1997)
- Noveyshie priklyucheniya Buratino (New Adventures of Buratino) (1997) as Tortilla-The-Tortoise
- Starye pesni o glavnom 2 (Old Songs of the Main Things 2) (1997) as Club director
- Starye pesni o glavnom 3 (Old Songs of the Main Things 3) (1998)
- Zolushka (Cinderella) (2003) as Godmother
