= Leonid Serebrennikov =

Russian singer (born 1947)

- Born: Leonid Fyodorovich Serebrennikov; October 2, 1947 (age 78); Moscow, RSFSR, Soviet Union
- Occupations: Actor, singer
- Spouse: Valentina Serebrennikova
- Children: Vladimir
- Awards: Honored Artist of Russia (2006)

Leonid Fyodorovich Serebrennikov (October 2, 1947, Moscow) is a Soviet and Russian actor and a singer. His voice appeared in approximately 70 films.

Performer of the song Absurdly, jokingly, blindly, madly, fairy... (Nelepo, smeshno, bezrassudno, bezumno, volshebno...) from a popular 1978 Soviet film An Ordinary Miracle, Just Imagine (Predstavte Sebe) from 1982 film Charodei.

He was the host of several television programs.
