= On the Trail of the Bremen Town Musicians =

- The Detective and the King
- Directed by: Vasily Livanov
- Written by: Vasily Livanov; Yuri Entin
- Starring: Muslim Magomayev; Elmira Zherzdeva; Gennady Gladkov; Anatoly Gorokhov
- Music by: Gennady Gladkov
- Production company: Soyuzmultfilm
- Release date: 1 May 1973
- Running time: 20 minutes
- Country: Soviet Union
- Language: Russian

On the Trail of the Bremen Town Musicians (Russian: По следам бременских музыкантов, romanized: Po sledam bremenskikh muzykantov) is a 1973 Soviet animated short film directed by Vasily Livanov. It was made as a sequel to The Bremen Town Musicians. Zherzdeva & Gorokhov, who voiced the princess & the donkey in the first film were the only ones to reprise their roles.

The King, wanting for his daughter to be found and returned to his castle, hires Detective to carry out the task. He successfully kidnaps and returns Princess back to the kingdom, but Troubadour and his animal friends Bremen Town Musicians hurry to release her. Disguised as foreign rock singers, the group distracts the King and the Detective, while Troubadour rescues his love and together they escape once again.

== Plot ==
The King, eager to bring his daughter back to the palace, hires a Genius Detective, who arrives singing about his exceptional skills. The Detective, accompanied by two royal guards, sets off on his mission. Meanwhile, the Troubadour and his friends—a Donkey, a Cat, a Dog, and a Rooster—are enjoying a day on a meadow, singing, fishing, and preparing lunch, while the Princess gathers flowers nearby. Suddenly, the guards and Detective, hiding under haystacks, capture the Princess. The musicians give chase, but the guards fail in their efforts to stop them. The Detective narrowly escapes into the castle with the Princess, while the musicians’ vehicle crashes into the gates, leaving them locked out.

That night, the Troubadour serenades the Princess from outside the castle, hoping she'll hear him. The Rooster sneaks into the castle for reconnaissance and discovers that the King intends to marry his daughter to a foreign singer arriving the next day. The Rooster narrowly avoids the Detective and sneaks out, but runs into a trio of bumbling thieves who briefly capture him before fleeing. The next morning, the musicians disguise themselves as foreign performers and put on a concert outside the palace. Everyone, including the King and Detective, is captivated by the show, but the Troubadour sneaks into the palace. He reaches the Princess, but their cover is blown, and in the ensuing chaos, the Troubadour and Princess make a daring escape. The King and Detective, caught in their own trap, end up in a fountain as the Troubadour and Princess ride away with their friends, to the kingdom's applause. The Detective tries to pursue them in a transformed airplane car but is humorously thwarted by the movie credits.

== Cast ==
- Muslim Magomayev - Troubadour, Detective and Atamansha
- Elmira Zherzdeva - Princess
- Gennady Gladkov - The King
- Anatoly Gorokhov, Leonid Berger and vocal ensemble - Bremen Town Musicians, the Robbers and the guards

== Production and soundtrack ==
The success of "The Bremen Town Musicians" was so huge that there were requests for a sequel. Vasily Livanov proposed the initial idea to Gladkov and Entin, turning in a song about a "genius detective" looking for a runaway Princess. Gladkov recalled: "Since some time has passed, we decided to make the Troubadour more adult, more baritone - for which we invited Muslim Magomayev". In addition to this, Entin heard Magomayev's album of his parodies of famous singers.

Gennady Gladkov himself sang for the King - it happened by accident. "Magomayev was supposed to sing, but he was absent at that moment, and I filled a temporary void in the soundtrack. And he listened and said, "I like the way Gladkov sings." They left it that way."

Magomayev refused a very significant fee, saying that it was "not a job, but a pleasure," and "he owes it [to the creators of the cartoon], not them to him."

The music and songs from the cartoon have been repeatedly published. The original vinyl release included narrator and was made in fairy tale format. In 2024, Shining Sioux Records released all music from both "The Bremen Town Musicians" and "On the Trail of the Bremen Town Musicians" in multiple formats; tracks were carefully restored including previously unreleased track "Abracadabra".

== Legacy ==
"On the Trail of the Bremen Town Musicians" vinyl release was listed among the 50 best albums of the "Melodiya" by "Silver Rain Radio".

"Luch solntsa zolotovo" ("Ray of the Golden Sun") is one of the most famous songs not only in the repertoire of Muslim Magomayev, but also in the entire post-Soviet space. "Russian Reporter" magazine ranks it 35th of the 100 best Russian songs. In his article, dedicated to Gennady Gladkov, Boris Barabanov (Kommersant) called it "perhaps the best song ever written in Russian."

== See also ==
- History of Russian animation
