= Gennady Gladkov =

Russian composer (1935–2023)

- Геннадий Гладков
- Gladkov in c. 2018
- Born: 18 February 1935; Moscow, Russian SFSR, Soviet Union
- Died: 16 October 2023 (aged 88); Moscow, Russia
- Occupations: Composer; musical pedagogue; singer
- Years active: 1953–2023
- Title: People's Artist of Russia (2002)
- Awards: Order "For Merit to the Fatherland" (4th class)

Gennady Igorevich Gladkov (Russian: Геннадий Игоревич Гладков; 18 February 1935 – 16 October 2023) was a Soviet and Russian composer. He composed music for some of the most famous Soviet movies and cartoons, most notably The Bremen Town Musicians.

== Biography ==
Gladkov was born in Moscow. He was a People's Artist of Russia (2002). Commander of the Order "For Merit to the Fatherland" 4th class.

From 2019, he had been reissuing his catalogue — for example, he had released soundtracks for the "Til'" performance, for "Separated" cartoon, the An Ordinary Miracle, as well as symphonic pieces, music for theater and cinema, etc.

Gladkov died on 16 October 2023, at the age of 88.

== Personal life ==
He supported the 2022 Russian invasion of Ukraine, even expressing desire to go to the fronts.

== Filmography ==
=== Soundtrack ===
- Most, Most, Most, Most (Самый, самый, самый, самый, 1966)
- Junior and Karlsson (Малыш и Карлсон, 1968)
- The Bremen Town Musicians (Бременские музыканты, 1969)
- Karlsson has Returned (Карлсон вернулся, 1970)
- The Blue Bird (Синяя птица, 1970)
- Gentlemen of Fortune (Джентльмены удачи, 1971)
- Train Stop – Two Minutes (Стоянка поезда — две минуты, 1972)
- Point, Point, Comma... (Точка, точка, запятая..., 1972)
- On the Trail of the Bremen Town Musicians (По следам бременских музыкантов, 1973)
- Well, Just You Wait!, eighth episode (Ну, погоди!, 1974)
- Til', (Тиль, 1974)
- How the Lion Cub and the Turtle Sang a Song (Как Львёнок и Черепаха пели песню, 1974)
- New Year Adventures of Masha and Vitya (Новогодние приключения Маши и Вити, 1975)
- Blue Puppy (Голубой щенок, 1976)
- The Twelve Chairs (12 стульев, 1976)
- The Dog in the Manger (Собака на сене, 1977)
- An Ordinary Miracle (Обыкновенное чудо, 1978)
- Robbery, ... Style (Ограбление по..., 1978)
- Very Blue Beard (Очень синяя борода, 1979)
- Hottabych! (Хоттабыч!) 1979
- Life and Adventures of Four Friends 1/2 (Жизнь и приключения четырех друзей 1/2, 1980)
- Life and Adventures of Four Friends 3/4 (Жизнь и приключения четырех друзей 3/4, 1981)
- The Vacancy (Вакансия, 1981)
- I Don't Want to Be an Adult (Не хочу быть взрослым, 1982)
- The House That Swift Built (Дом, который построил Свифт, 1982)
- Formula of Love (Формула любви, 1984)
- After the Rain, on Thursday (После дождичка в четверг, 1985)
- Joys of the Youth (Забавы молодых, 1987)
- A Man from the Boulevard des Capucines (Человек с бульвара Капуцинов, 1987)
- To Kill a Dragon (Убить дракона, 1988)
- Two Arrows. Stone Age Detective (Две стрелы. Детектив каменного века, 1989)
- Crazies (Чокнутые, 1991)
- Breakfast with a View to the Elbrus Mountains (Завтрак с видом на Эльбрус, 1993)
- Don Quixote Returns (Дон Кихот возвращается, 1997)
- The New Bremen Town Musicians (Новые бременские, 2000)
- Carmen (Кармен, 2003)

=== Voice acting ===
- On the Trail of the Bremen Town Musicians – The King
- Formula of Love – Semyon Farada's singing voice
- The New Bremen Town Musicians – The Cat, the robbers
