= Vladimir Gulyaev =

Soviet actor (1924–1997)

- Born: Vladimir Leonidovich Gulyaev; 30 October 1924; Sverdlovsk, Soviet Union
- Died: 3 October 1997 (aged 72); Moscow, Russia
- Occupation: Actor
- Years active: 1951-1991
- Spouse: Rimma Shorokhova
- Children: 2

Vladimir Leonidovich Gulyaev (Russian: Влади́мир Леони́дович Гуля́ев; 30 October 1924, Yekaterinburg, RSFSR — 3 October 1997, Moscow) was a Soviet actor of theater and cinema.

== Biography ==
He was born October 30, 1924, in Sverdlovsk (now Yekaterinburg, Russia). His father was a candidate of historical sciences and the deputy head of the political department of the Molotov Military Aviation. During World War II, he went to work as a mechanic in an aviation workshop, and in 1942, became a cadet of Molotov Military Aviation School of Pilots. Having graduated with honors in November 1943, he received the rank of Junior Lieutenant of the Air Force. He fought in Belarus and the Baltic States. He ended his service as a Red Army lieutenant in East Prussia. He participated in the Moscow Victory Parade of 1945 on Red Square. He graduated from Gerasimov Institute of Cinematography in 1951. As a student, he married his classmate Rimma Shorokhov. By the mid-1950s, the couple broke up. From 1951 to 1988, he was an actor at the National Film Actors' Theatre. He died on November 3, 1997, at the age of 73 in Moscow. He was buried at a columbarium in Kuntsevo Cemetery.

== Selected filmography ==
- The Village Doctor (1952) as Viktor Potapov
- Incident in the Taiga (1954) as Yasha
- Least We Forget (1954) as student
- Did We Meet Somewhere Before (1954) as cyclist
- World Champion (1955) as Konstantin Kovalyov
- Other People's Relatives (1956) as Gulyaev
- Spring on Zarechnaya Street (1956) as Yura
- Jurášek (1957) as Solovjev
- Alyosha's Love (1961) as Sergey
- Chronicle of Flaming Years (1961) as Military tribunal member
- The Chairman (1964) as Vladimir Ramenkov
- Come Here, Mukhtar! (1965) as senior instructor
- Operation Y and Shurik's Other Adventures (1965) as policeman (uncredited)
- Zigzag of Success (1968) as policeman
- The Diamond Arm (1968) as Lieutenant
- The Secret Agent's Blunder (1968) as taxi driver in Leningrad
- Dangerous Tour (1969) as policeman
- Grandads-Robbers (1972) as driver
- Earthly Love (1975) as Smirnov
- It Can't Be! (1975) as One-eyed furniture dealer
- Jaroslaw Dabrowski (1976) as episode
