= Georgi Kulikov (actor) =

Soviet and Russian actor (1924–1995)

- Born: 9 June 1924; Moscow, Soviet Union
- Died: 24 December 1995 (aged 71); Moscow, Russia
- Occupation: Actor
- Years active: 1944—1995

Georgi Ivanovich Kulikov (Russian: Георгий Иванович Куликов; 9 June 1924 — 24 December 1995) was a Russian actor. He appeared in more than forty films from 1955 to 1990.

As a young man in the summer of 1941, Kulikov found work as a welder and a tractor driver, while managing to assemble a theatrical education, studying with fellow young actor Nikolai Rybnikov, eventually graduating from the Mikhail Shchepkin Higher Theatre School in 1948. His career encompassed theater, films, radio, and teaching drama from 1971 to 1978. Kulikov was named a Merited Artist of the Russian Federation in April 1967, and after his death on Christmas Eve, 1995, was buried in Moscow's Troyekurovskoye Cemetery.

== Filmography ==
Year	Title	Role	Notes
1955	Spring Voices	seller	
1956	Carnival Night	Usikov	
1956	Ordinary Person	Aleksey Ladygin	
1957	The Cranes Are Flying	engineer	
1958	The Girl Without an Address	Yury Aleksandrovich	
1960	Thrice Resurrected	Arkadiy Shmelyov	
1961	Clear Skies	Mitya	
1969	Bonivur's Heart	Parker	
1971	Grandads-Robbers	head of technical department	
1972	Taming of the Fire	Sharov	
1987	Investigation Held by ZnaToKi	Nikitin	
