= The Height =

- Directed by: Aleksander Zarkhi
- Written by: Mikhail Papava
- Based on: The Height by Yevgeni Vorobyov
- Starring: Nikolai Rybnikov; Inna Makarova; Gennadi Karnovich-Valua; Vasili Makarov; Marina Strizhenova; Boris Sitko
- Cinematography: Vladimir Monakhov
- Music by: Rodion Shchedrin
- Production company: Mosfilm
- Release date: 1957
- Running time: 94 min.
- Country: Soviet Union
- Language: Russian

The Height (Russian: Высота, Translit.: Vysota) is a 1957 Soviet romantic drama film produced at Mosfilm and directed by Aleksander Zarkhi after the novel of the same name written by Evgeny Vorobyov. It stars Nikolai Rybnikov and Inna Makarova.

== Plot ==
A team of steel erectors is sent to build a blast furnace at a steel mill construction site in a small town. The team is led by foreman Konstantin Tokmakov and crew chief Nikolay Pasechnik, a shockworker of Socialist Labour known for his charm, wit, and popularity among women. Among the workers is welder Katerina Petrashen', an unconventional young woman who smokes (a habit frowned upon as immoral), wears colorful dresses, is not a member of the Komsomol, and behaves in a way deemed provocative by others. Despite their differences, Nikolay and Katerina develop a mutual attraction, though their relationship is complicated by arguments and the interference of Katerina's former suitor, Vasily Khaenko, a gossip and unreliable worker.

Tensions rise when site manager Igor Deryabin orders work to continue during severe weather, resulting in a critical piece of equipment becoming uncontrollable and endangering the construction. Nikolay's courageous actions save the project but lead to a conflict when Deryabin shifts responsibility for the incident to engineer Tokmakov. Later, as prolonged rains delay construction, Nikolay and Tokmakov devise a plan to assemble equipment on the ground, enabling the project to progress despite Deryabin's absence. During the final stage of construction, Nikolay heroically climbs the structure to plant a red flag but falls from a great height, sustaining severe injuries.

While hospitalized, Nikolay is cared for by Katerina, who undergoes a transformation inspired by his determination and the challenges they faced together. She vows to quit smoking, join the Komsomol, and build a better life for herself. Despite his injuries preventing him from joining the team on future projects, Nikolay finds solace in his deepening bond with Katerina, while the construction team celebrates the successful completion of the blast furnace and moves on to their next endeavor. The story highlights themes of resilience, personal growth, and the triumph of human effort.

== Cast ==
- Nikolai Rybnikov as Nikolay Pasechnik, foreman of fitters
- Inna Makarova as Katya Petrashen, welder
- Gennady Karnovich-Valois as Konstantin Maximovich Tokmakov, foreman from Zaporozhye
- Vasily Makarov as Igor Rodionovich Deryabin, Candidate of Science, Head of the Installation Department
- Marina Strizhenova as Masha, the wife of Deryabin
- Boris Sitko as Innokenty Panteleimonovich Dymov, Head of Construction
- Sergei Romodanov as father of Masha and Boris Berestov
- Yelena Maksimova as mother of Masha and Boris Berestovs
- Lev Borisov as Boris Berestov
- Leonid Chubarov as Vasya Khayenko, fitter
