= White Tower (Yekaterinburg) =

- Белая башня
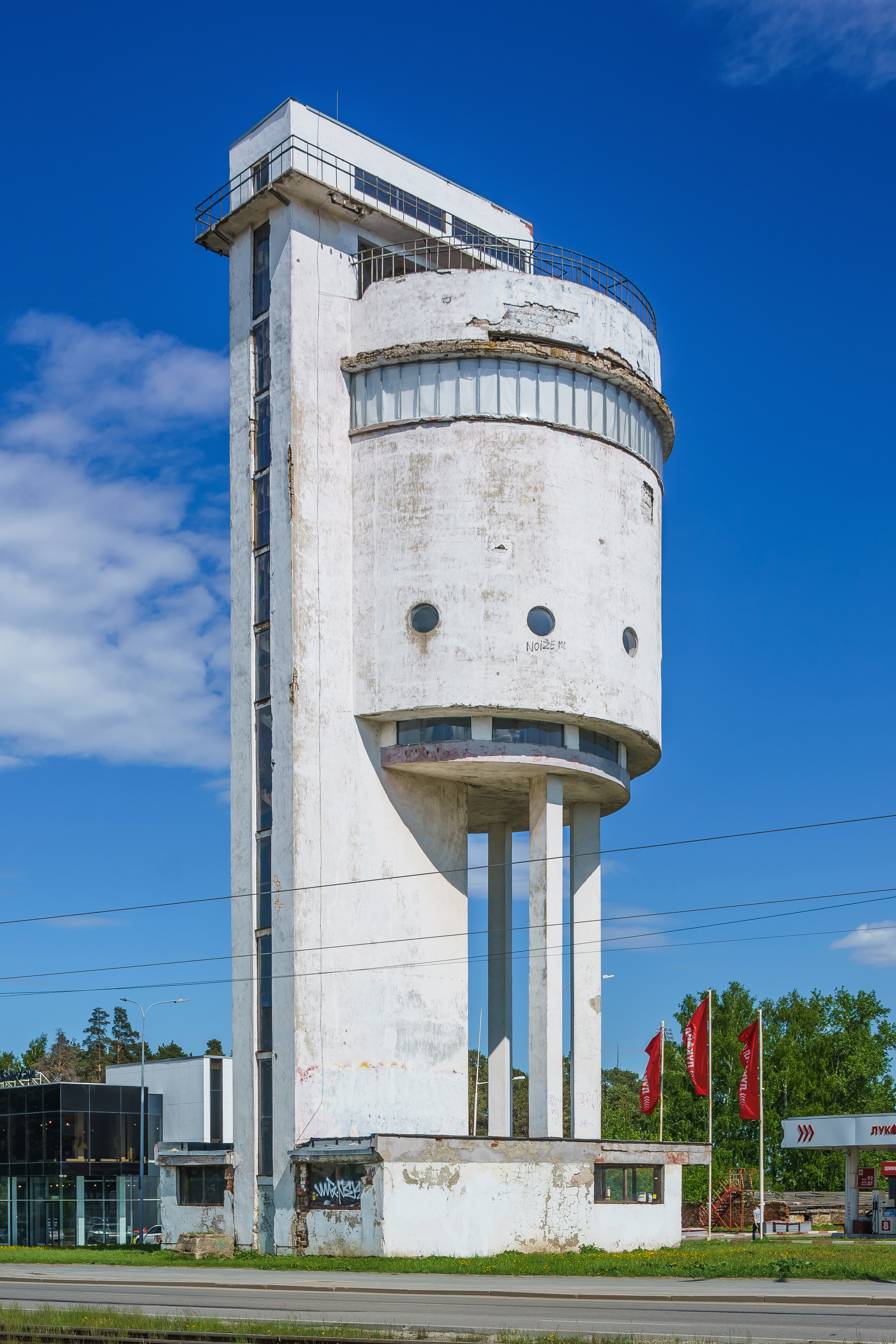
- The White Tower in 2019
- Interactive map of the White Tower area

General information
- Type: Water tower
- Architectural style: Constructivism
- Location: Yekaterinburg, Russia, 2 Bakinskikh Komissarov street
- Coordinates: 56°53′35″N 60°34′21″E
- Year built: 1929-1931

Height
- Height: 29 m (95 ft)

Dimensions
- Diameter: 13.5 m (44 ft)

Design and construction
- Architect: Moisei Reisher
- Engineer: Vladimir Fidler

Website
- https://www.tower1929.ru/

The White Tower (Russian: Белая башня romanized: Belaya bashnya) is a constructivist monument and a former water tower of the Uralmash plant in Yekaterinburg, Russia. The tower was built in 1929–1931 by the architect Moisei Reisher and became one of the first reinforced concrete structures in the city.

With the development of the city's water supply network in the 1960s, the tower was taken out of service, was not used for many years and fell into disrepair. In September 2012, the Federal State Property Management Agency transferred the building for free use to the Podelniki architectural group, which organized the conservation and gradual restoration of the building. The building is currently used as a cultural venue and is considered to be the unofficial symbol of Uralmash neighborhood.

In 1974, the White Tower was recognized as an architectural monument of national significance.

== History ==
On 15 July 1928, in the north of Yekaterinburg (at that time Sverdlovsk), the foundation of the future metalworking shop of the Ural Heavy Machinery Plant (Uralmash) was ceremoniously laid. Along with the construction of production buildings, the construction of a neighbourhood for workers began, this large-scale construction soon faced a water shortage. Initially, water was delivered by horses from wells near the Kamyshenka River, but its quality did not meet the requirements. Additionally, there is information about the construction of a temporary water pipeline from the Kalinovka stream.

As the existing water resources could not satisfy the growing needs of the construction site and the functioning of the town, the Uralmash management began to look for other ways to solve the problem. Professor-hydrogeologist Modeste Clerc suggested that on the shore of Lake Shuvakish at a depth of about 50 meters there is a pool of artesian water, from which it would be possible to extract up to 5000 m^{3} of water per day. A group of specialists from the Nizhny Tagil Vysokogorsk Mining Administration, headed by hydrogeologist Aleksandr Tutunin, was invited to develop the deposits. Having drilled eight test wells, the researchers discovered water at a depth of 80–100 meters.

In 1928, the design department of Uralmash began working on the project of the water tower and its communications, while drilling of the wells on Lake Shuvakish began only in the spring of 1930. During the drilling, a chisel broke off, which for a long time could not be removed from the well, delaying the construction. By the decision of the chief engineer Vladimir Fidler, a contract was signed with group of German specialists, for drilling five wells with a diameter of half a meter. Two of them turned out to be low-water, but all of them were enough to supply drinking water to the workers' town via a temporary pipeline by mid-September 1930. A year later, the laying of permanent communications was completed and the construction of a pumping station and reservoirs was finished.

=== Сonstruction of the tower ===
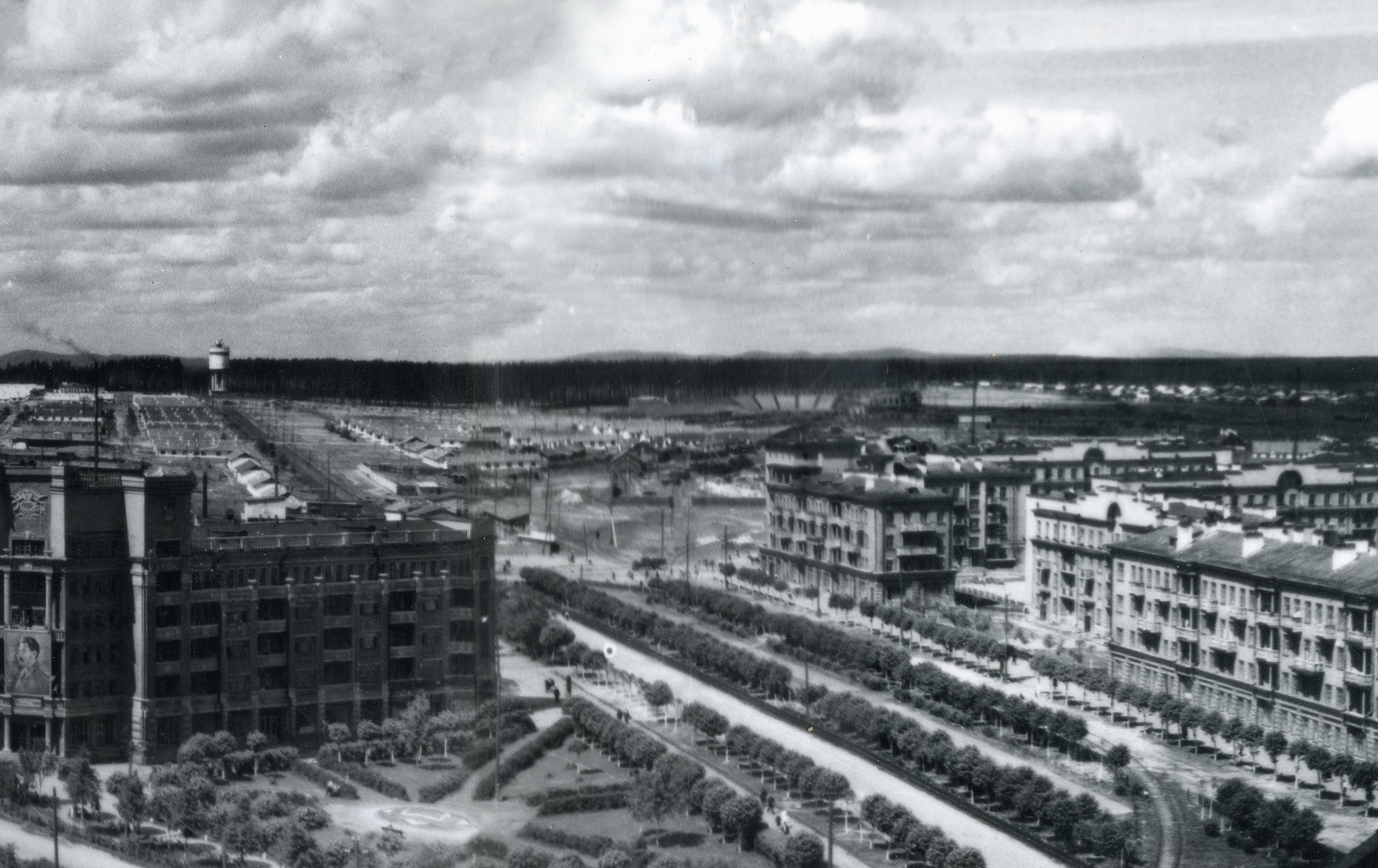
Uralmash neighbourhood with the White Tower in the background, 1930s

At the end of 1928, the head of the design department, Iosif Robachevskiy, with the support of the chief construction engineer, Vladimir Fidler, proposed building a water tower according to an individual design. Department members were given only a week to develop a project plan. A competition was held and the project by Moisei Reisher was chosen for construction. He proposed using reinforced concrete, which was new at the time, as the main material, thanks to which the structure turned out to be lightweight and stood out from the other competition projects. Little information has been preserved about the work of other competition participants. Some sources also mention that Fidler also took part in the competition, proposing a metal structure for the tower based on the system of engineer Vladimir Shukhov.

Initially, Reisher planned to place a monolithic reinforced concrete tank with a capacity of 540 m^{3} in the tower, an observation deck on the roof, a newspaper kiosk and a bus stop pavilion at the base. It was planned that the tank would rest on two monolithic reinforced concrete columns and a stairwell. But during the revision of the project, additional supports were added, the infrastructure of the first floor was abandoned, round windows were added along the facade, and instead of a reinforced concrete tank, it was decided to use a steel one with a capacity of 700 m^{3}. Thus, the engineers decided to play it safe when working with an unfamiliar material. Reisher was critical of the two added columns, stating:

With a metal tank, the ceiling had to be supported by the outer walls of the tank's insulation. A vault appeared, adding the weight of another two-meter concrete wall, and all this lay on the consoles of a large extension, due to which they turned out to be very powerful.

The Moscow design bureau "Tekhbeton" under the leadership of the engineer Sergei Prokhorov prepared the final drawings and supervised the construction. The drawings of the welded metal tank were prepared by the design bureau of Uralmashstroy according to the system of the German engineer Otto Intze. The tank became the first steel structure in the city made using electric welding rather than riveting. The work on the tank was entrusted to welder Vladimir Volnov and a group of young workers, who completed the task in five months. The assessment of the work performed was entrusted to Professor Valentin Vologdin and other prominent specialists.

The first hydraulic tests were carried out in the newly built tower on 5 June 1931. An hour after the ceremonial opening and start of operation, the bottom of the tank sagged and collapsed, and a stream of water flooded the nearby streets. The new bottom was made of reinforced concrete according to the design of engineer Sergei Prokhorov. The tower was finally put into operation in 1931. At that time, its tank was the largest in the world.

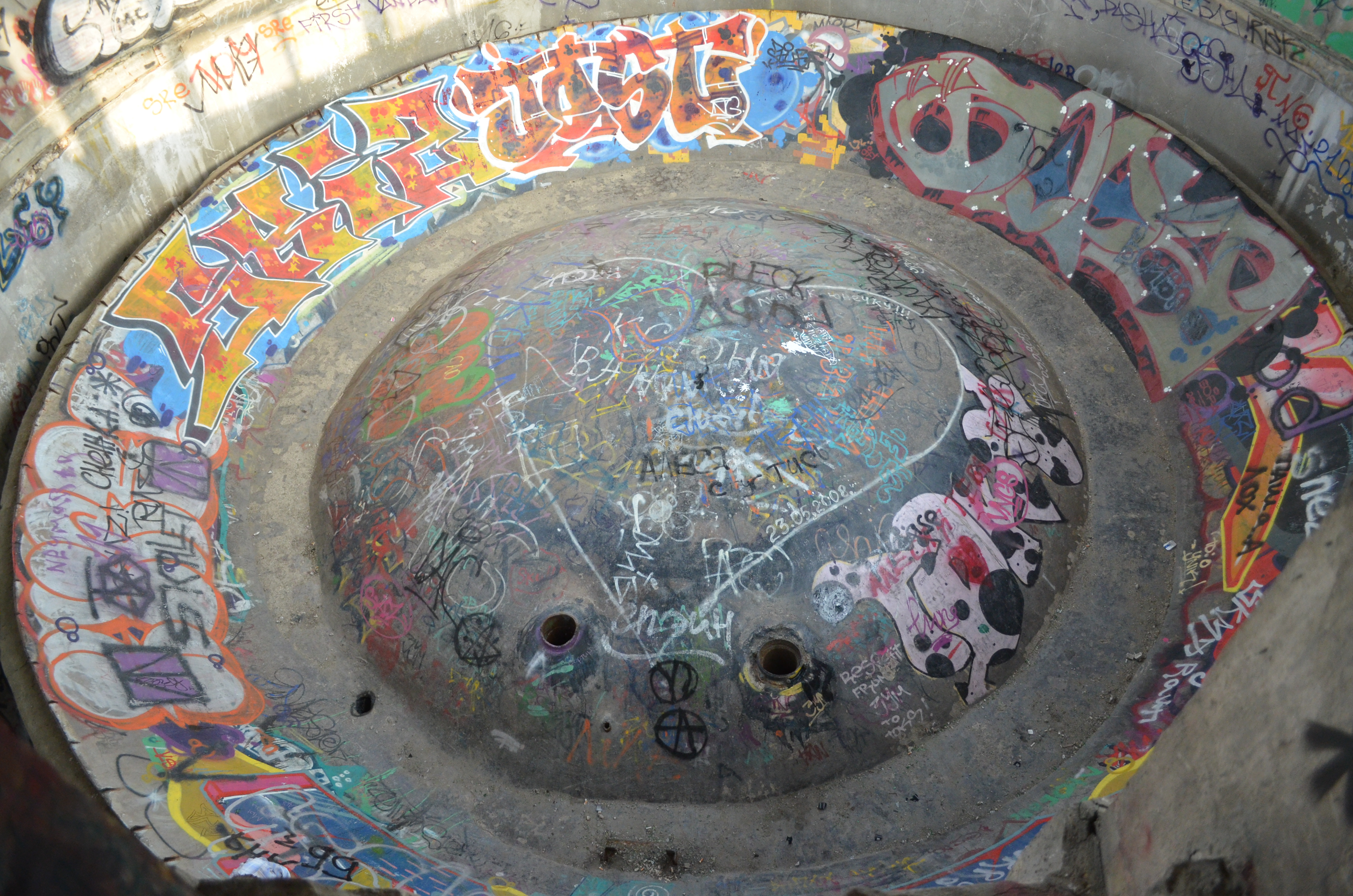
The preserved bottom of the water tank before the renovation works, 2014

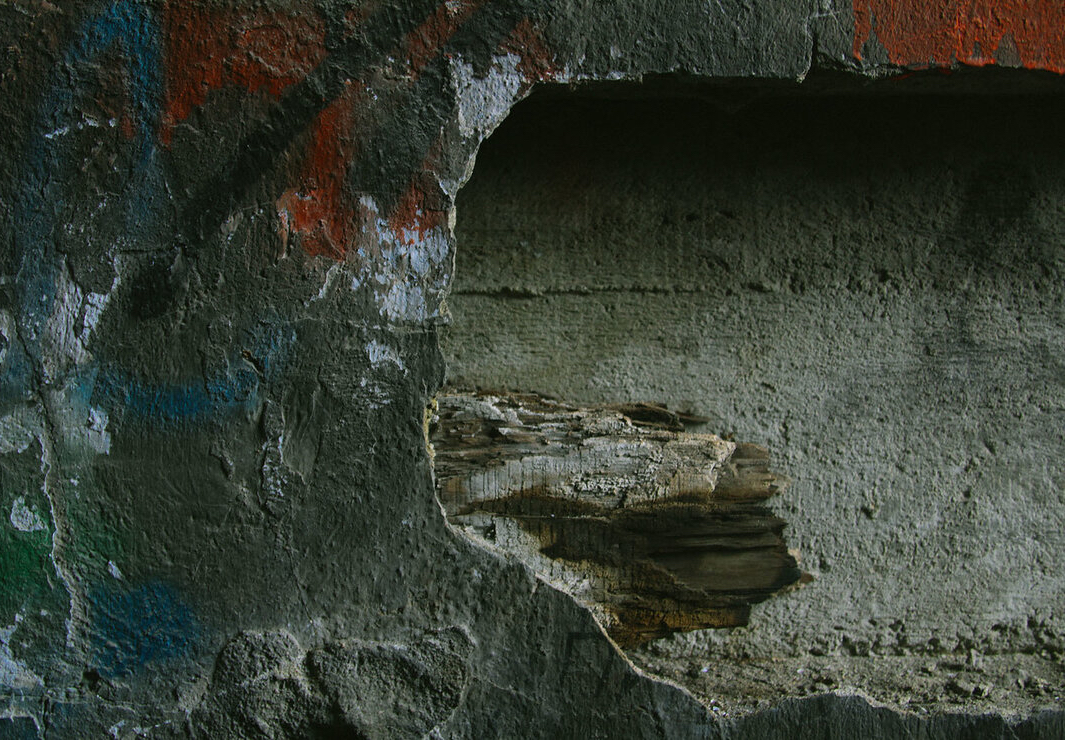
Wooden formwork inside the White Tower, 2018

Subsequently, Reisher was awarded the “Shock worker of Communist Labor” title for his water tower project. The water tower received the unofficial name "White Tower" for its lime-painted walls. During World War II, as a strategically important facility, it was painted camouflage green.

=== In operation ===
In autumn of 1931, the Uralmash management announced that the artesian water did not require purification and the pressure on all mains from the tower reached four atmospheres, marking the final solution of the water supply problem. In 1932, four additional wells were drilled on Lake Shuvakish and a temporary water pipeline was laid from Verkhne-Isetsky Pond when complaints about the drop in pressure began to come in. Hydrogeologists were invited to study the remaining water reserves at Shuvakish; they came to the conclusion that the underground reservoirs were depleted due to excessive extraction and recommended reducing consumption. This was difficult in the conditions of developing infrastructure, so in 1937 the plant's engineers built a dam on the Kalinovka River flowing out of Shuvakish, which did not help and even provoked the swamping of the lake.

Reportedly, in 1937 the NKVD opened a criminal case against Fidler, he was accused of deliberately concealing the low water level at Shuvakish, which led to a waste of money and a shortage of drinking water. Eventually the commissariat found out that the engineer died in 1932, and the case was closed.

Water consumption increased with the growth of the plant and its housing estate. By 1940, when the residential area reached 15 km^{2}, more than 80% of the water came from Verkhne-Isetsky Pond. During the reconstruction of water supply networks in Sverdlovsk in the post-war years, it became clear that the White Tower would soon lose its functional significance. The pumping stations on Lake Shuvakish were decommissioned in the 1940s, and the pumping equipment was dismantled and the station was closed in the early 1960s.

=== After the closure ===
The tower was decommissioned in the 1960s. After that, the issue of refurbishment and preservation of the complex was raised by various authorities, including the author of the project, but no measures were taken, and the building fell into disrepair. In 1970, the White Tower was included in the list of monuments of Soviet construction that were to be taken under state protection.

A year later, Reisher, together with a group of artists, presented a project for a 100-seat café, located in the reservoir, and an observation deck with an ice cream kiosk on the roof. The Ordzhonikidzevsky District Administration approved the proposal and the Uralmashstroy Directorate was ready to sponsor the project, but it was not implemented due to the chief architect of Sverdlovsk, Gennady Belyankin being against it. The project was abandoned due to non-compliance with fire safety standards.

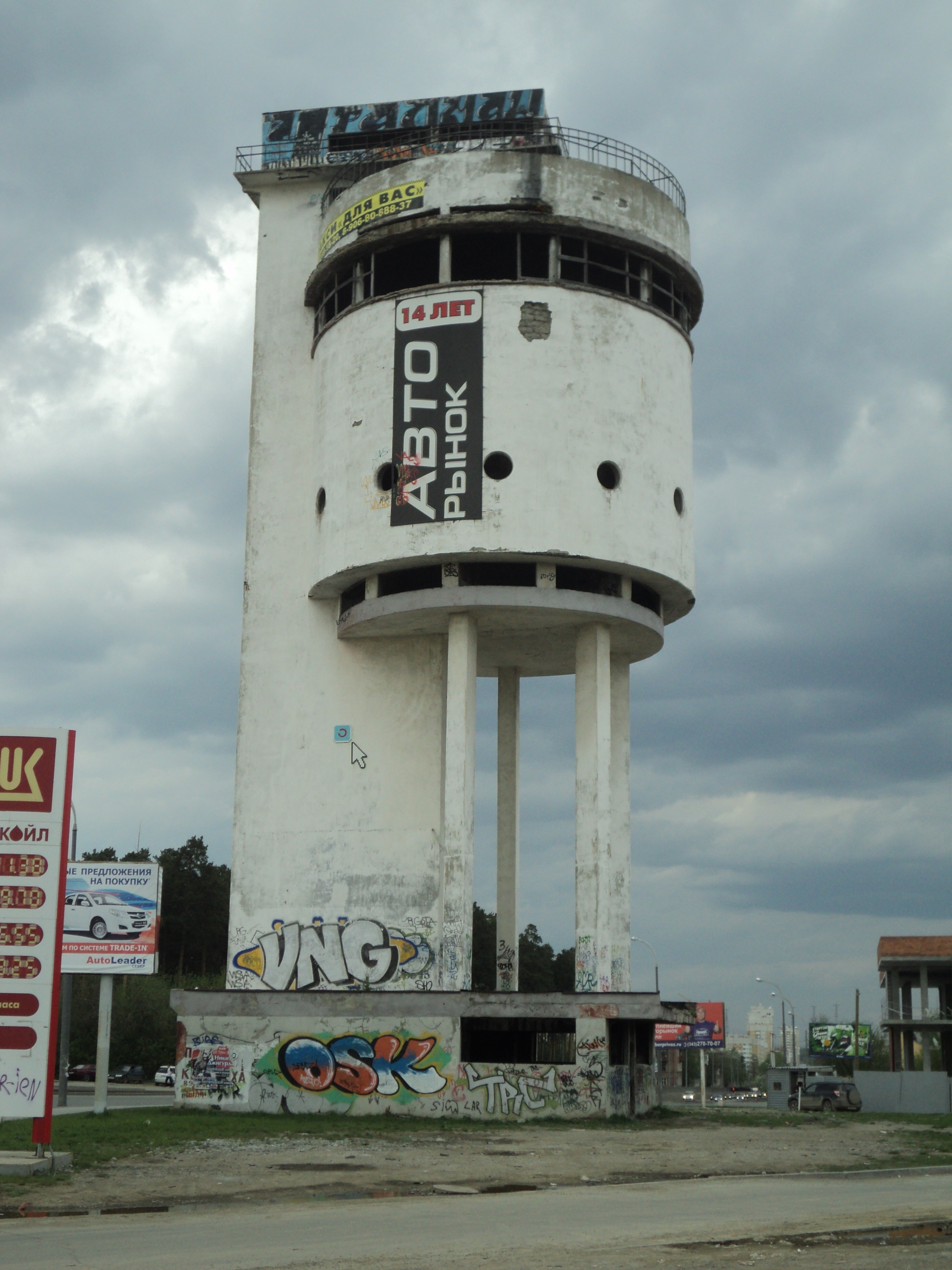
The tower before renovation

In 1974, the White Tower was recognized as an architectural monument of national significance, and a year later the Sverdlovskgrazhdanproekt Institute held a competition for a project to adapt the structure for other purposes, which also did not develop. Subsequently, the issue of further exploitation of the White Tower was repeatedly raised in the press and the facility was listed on the balance sheet of Uralmash.

In the 1990s, Uralmash transferred the structure to its subsidiary insurance company "Belaya Bashnya" which was also interested in opening a restaurant there. Repairs to the tower were delayed "due to a lack of funds", and it was soon transferred to the jurisdiction of the regional Property Management Committee. Since 1993, an eponymous car market is located under the tower. In 2002, together with the Ural Architectural Museum and Exhibition Complex, works from the “Future of the White Tower” competition were presented at an exhibition dedicated to the 100th anniversary of Reisher's birth.

From 2006 to 2012, the White Tower was under the management of the regional office of the Russian Red Cross. According to architect Polina Ivanova, the organization was interested not in the building, but in the plot of land on which it was located. The Red Cross signed a contract to renovate the tower to house a planetarium and a museum of constructivism, but was unable to secure funding. According to the head of the local preservation organization, Dmitry Vershinin, they considered the possibility of restoring the monument in exchange for advertising space, which didn't go through, as this would violate to the rules for using a cultural heritage site. In 2012, the Ministry of Culture accused the Red Cross of failing to comply with conservation obligations, and the contract for the use of the monument was terminated.

Public organizations and the media repeatedly pointed out the dilapidated state of the building and its danger to those around it. The tower became a place for homeless people to spend the night in the tower, there also was unauthorized construction around the building. According to art historians, the tower could have collapsed under the influence of external factors and due to defects in the building materials.

In 2012, the public organization "Group of Architectural Initiatives, Events and Communications" was created, which became known as the Podelniki architectural group. Activists declared their intention to restore the White Tower, and together with the head of the Tatlin publishing house Eduard Kubensky, they organized a round table to discuss the future of the building. On September 19, 2012, the federal authorities transferred the monument to the use of a public organization (Order No. 363).

Since spring 2013, regular clean-up days have been held in the tower. In August 2013, representatives of the Brandenburg Technical University together with the students of the Ural State Academy of Architecture and Arts and the Ural Federal University explored the tower. After examining the tower and drawing public attention to its condition, Podelniki began the conservation work: installing windows, doors and railings, repairing the roof and decking, and installing electricity. The repair work took place in 2015–2016.

In July 2020, the Shchusev State Museum of Architecture received a $180,000 grant from the Getty Foundation for the restoration of the tower as part of the "Preservation of Modernity" program. The program is aimed at studying the condition and preservation of 20th-century architectural monuments; grants are awarded to institutions whose applications win the competition. The money received from the Getty Foundation will be used for further examination of the tower, and on its basis, a project for its restoration and adaptation for use as a public space will be prepared. As of 2024, еhe restoration project is undergoing a state historic-cultural examination.

== Architecture ==
The White Tower is considered a notable example of industrial architecture of the constructivist period. Situated on a hill, the 29-metre tower served as the architectural dominant of the Kultury Boulevard and the surrounding area, in the direction of which all the surrounding buildings were oriented. Historically, it was planned to complement the architectural ensemble of the area with a stadium in a similar style, designed by Pyotr Oransky, but the project was never implemented. In the 1970s, the Uralmash palace of culture was built in the neighbourhood, which blocked the view of the water tower. Art historians note that the horizontal and vertical ribbon glazing adds expressiveness to the composition, contrasting with the blank walls of the reservoir.

The tower's design is represented by two main volumes: a cylindrical part with a base diameter of 13.5 meters, and a vertical parallelepiped containing a staircase. The parallelepiped is 5.75 meters long and 3.2 meters wide. Inside the cylindrical volume there is a tank with a concave bottom, tapering towards the base, which is supported by four external columns and two internal staircases through a 0.6 meter wide monolithic reinforced concrete beam. The basement of the complex has a cylindrical volume with a diameter of 6.1 meters. The roof of the tower is made of reinforced concrete, equipped with a parapet and a stiffening ring directly above the window strip.

The water tank is pulled together by three reinforced concrete rings, located at equal distances from each other. The cylinder is supported by six massive consoles, which are attached to the main support columns and equipped with vertical crossbars, redistributing the load and increasing the rigidity of the support ring in the horizontal direction. Between the tank and the outer wall of the cylindrical volume, a gap of 0.7 meters was left, intended for maintenance of the tank. To maintain the water temperature, the internal walls of this space were lined with formwork and covered with plaster. To protect against precipitation, a frame tent was provided around the tank, the weight of which was distributed among the columns by two rows of crossbars. The wall fencing of the tent is made of bentonite stones with insulation made of scirpus. In the 1990s, a steel deck was installed under the tank's dome, and the wooden roof of the staircase tower was replaced with monolithic reinforced concrete. As of 2016, the tank was almost completely dismantled, with only the monolithic reinforced concrete convex bottom remaining.

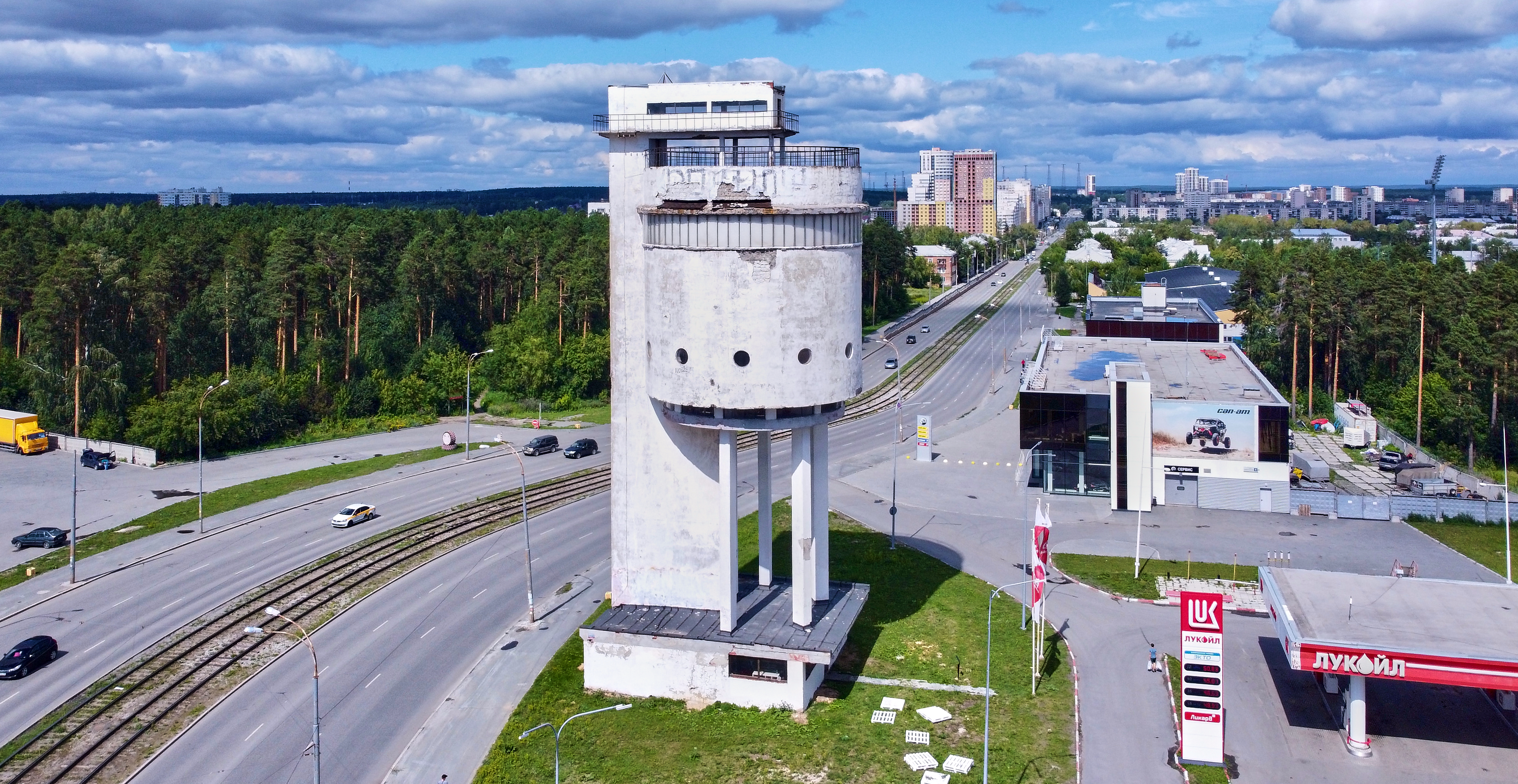
View on the tower, 2021

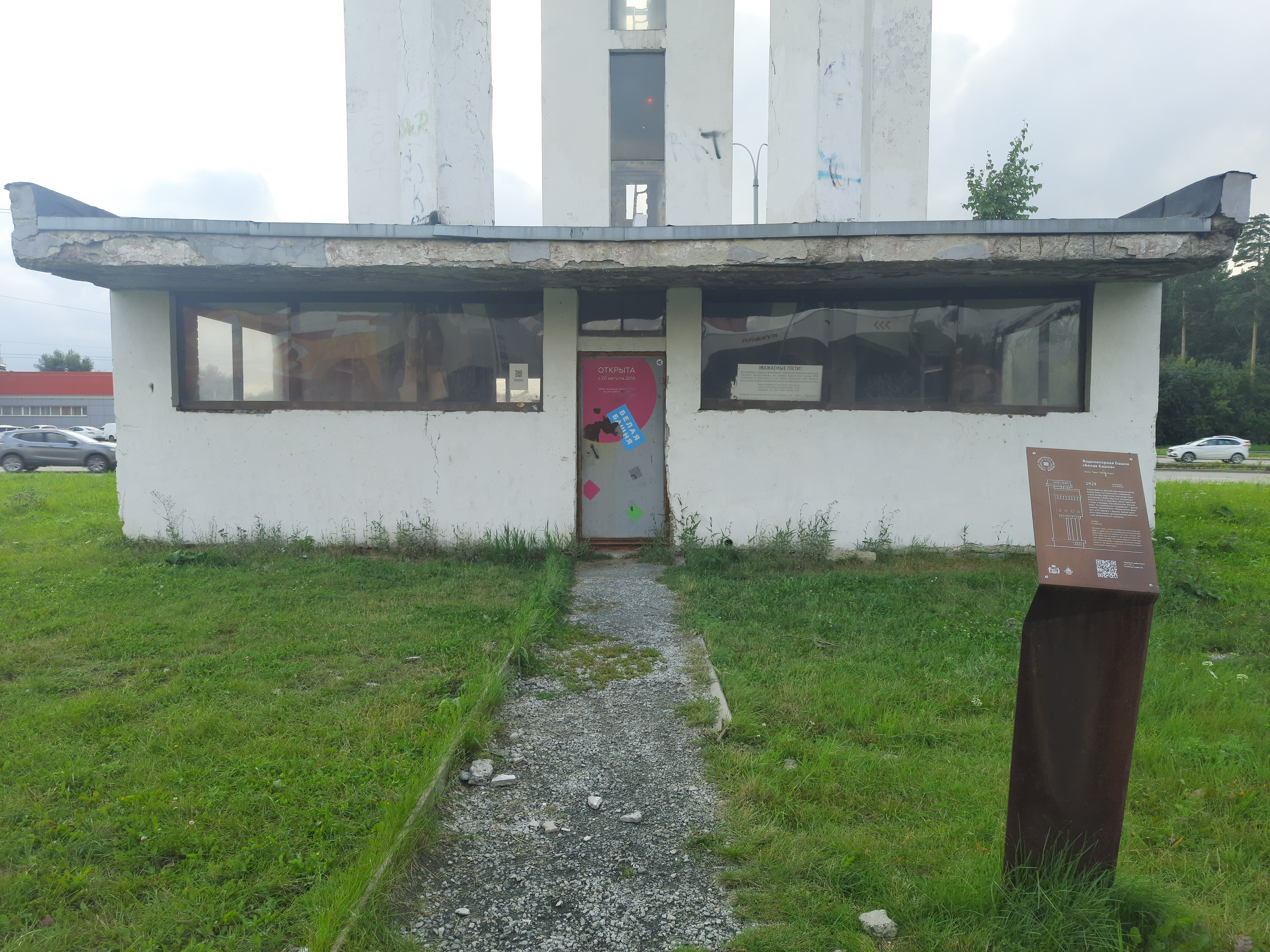
Tower entrance

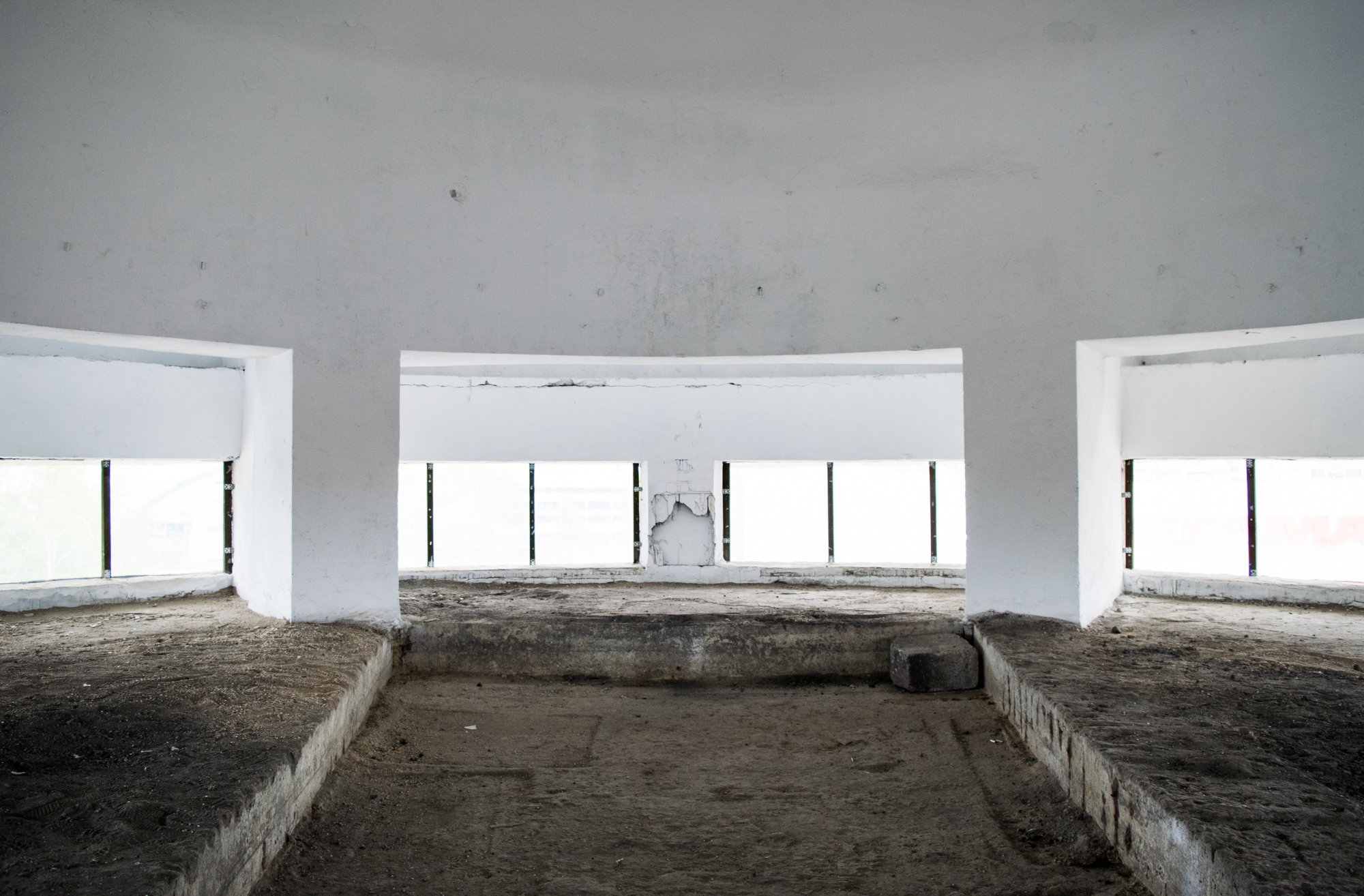
Former technical room under the tank

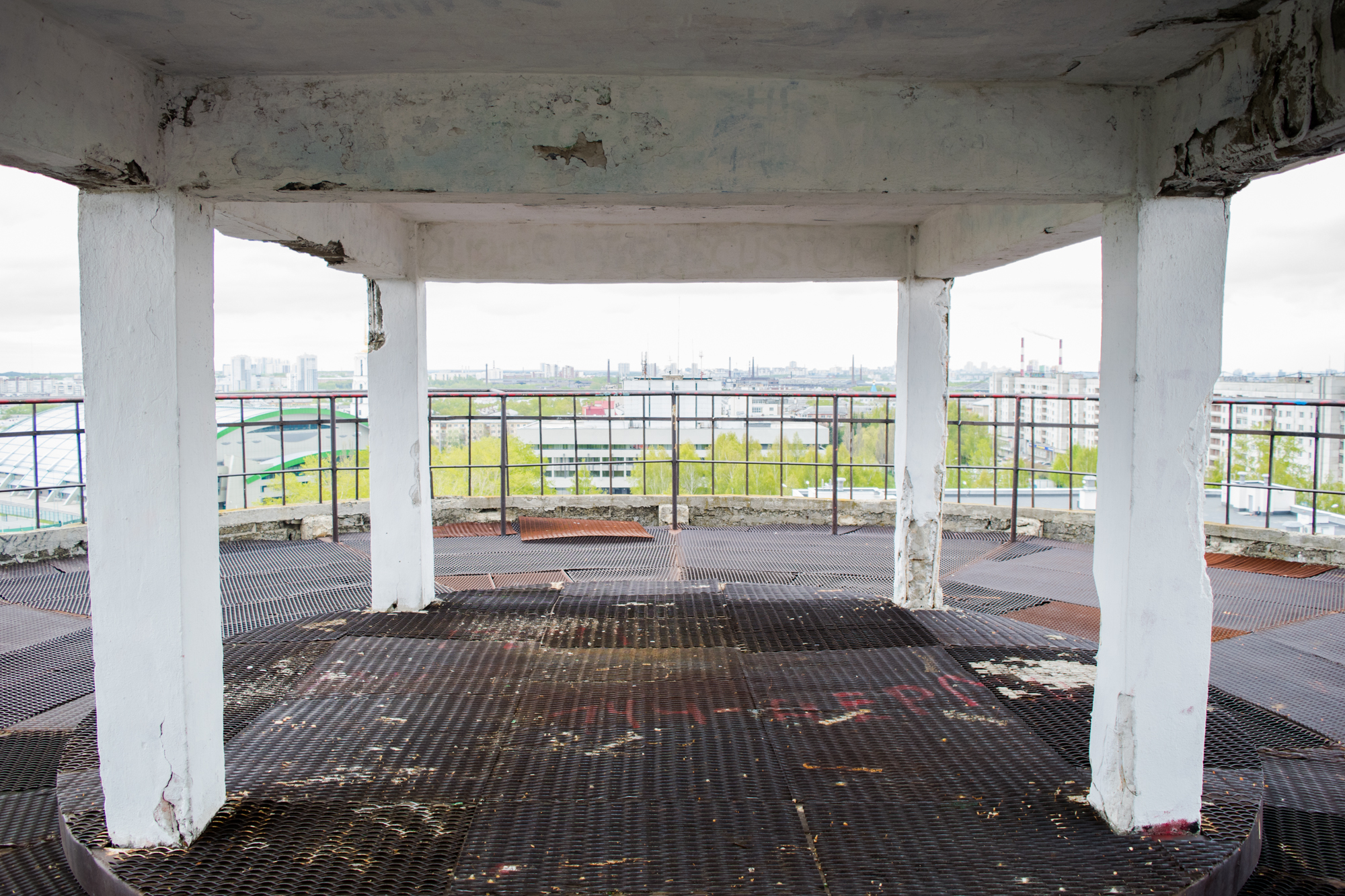
Observation deck

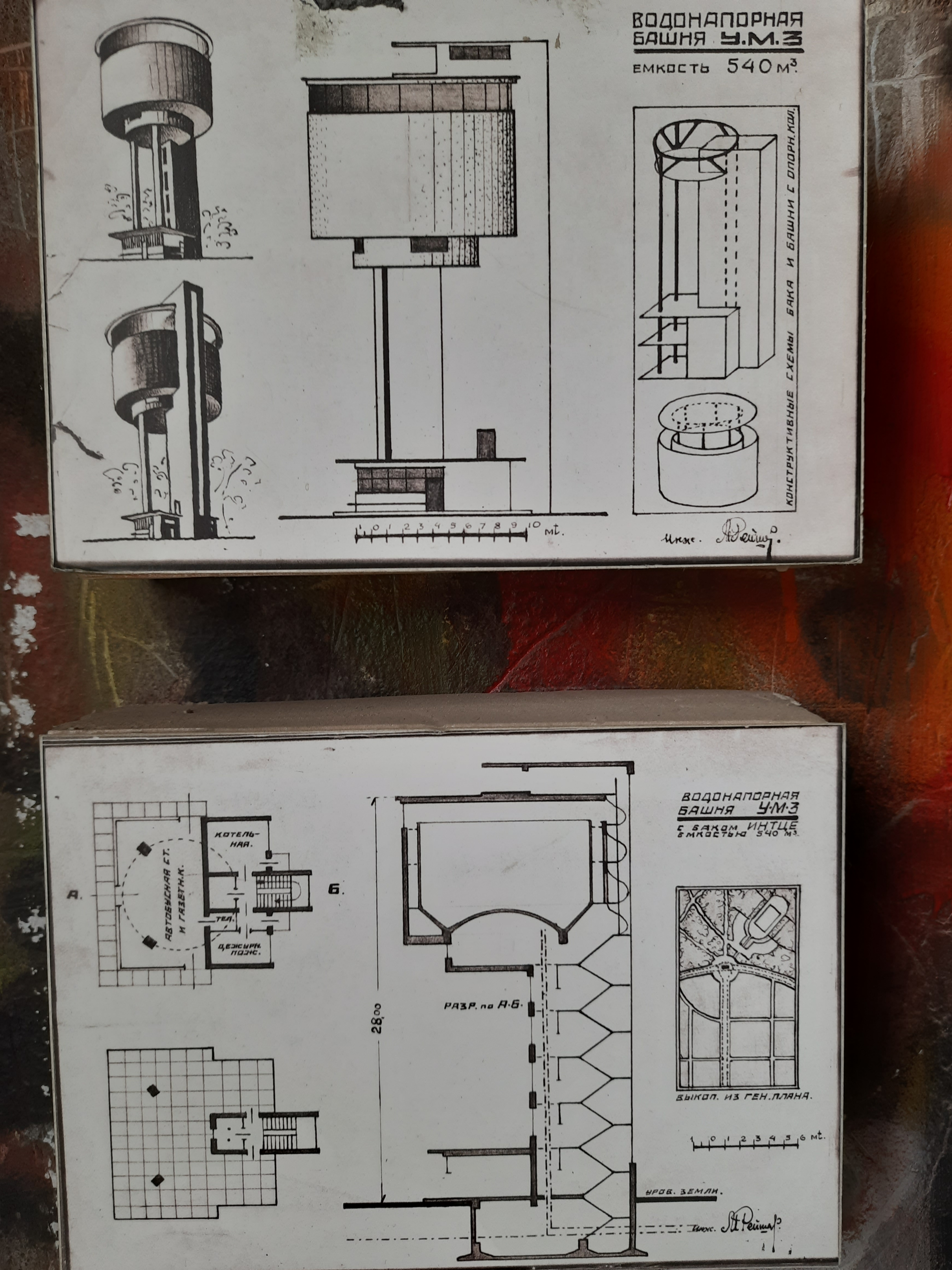
Architectural drawings

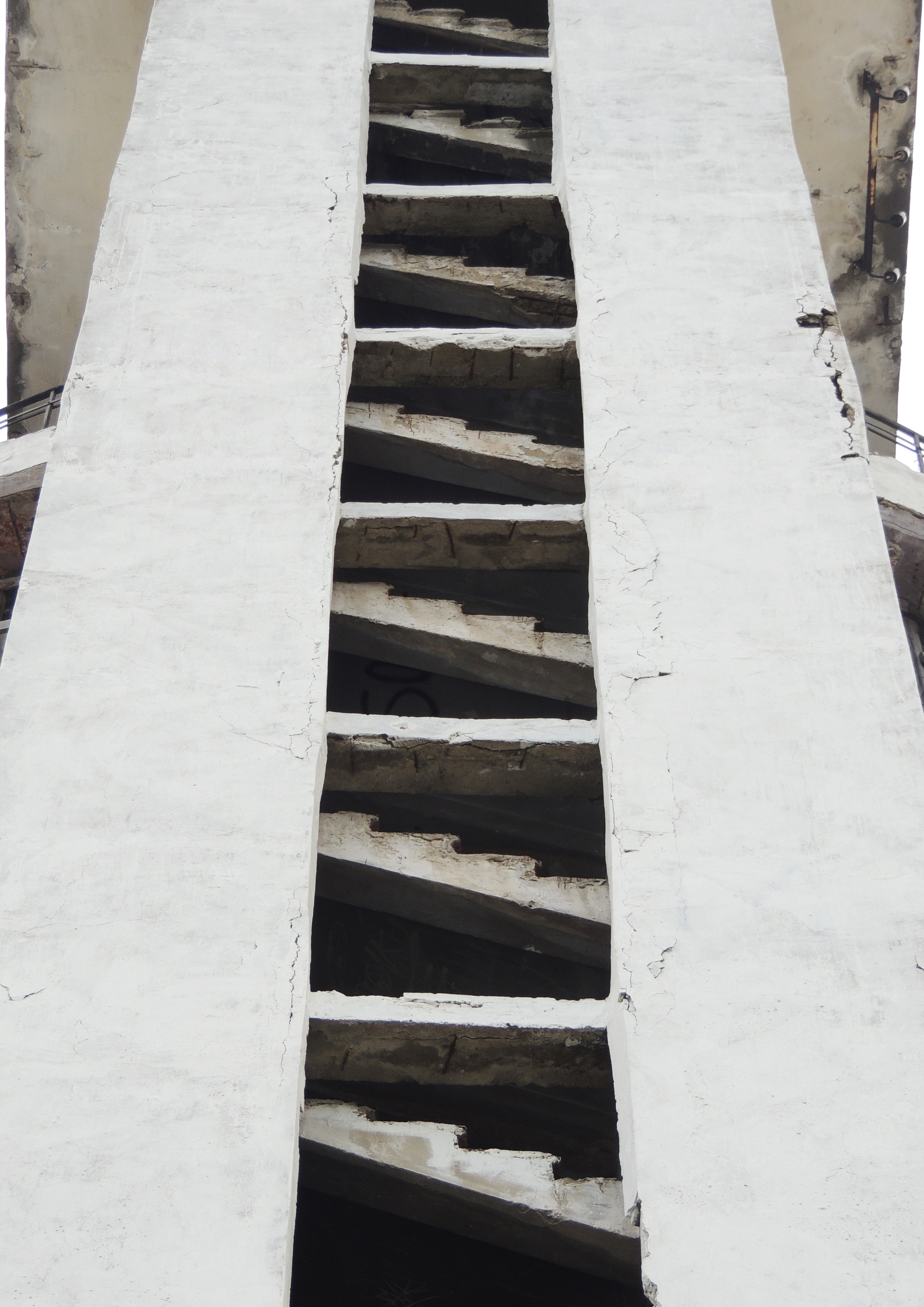
Staircase

== Cultural venue ==
The White Tower was originally conceived as an expressive object that could become a symbol of the city. It is believed that the tower inspired the authors of other projects, such as the water tower of the "Krasny Gvozdilshchik" plant by Yakov Chernikhov or the tower next to the power plant building on the territory of Uralmash. The White Tower space annually hosts festivals, exhibitions, performances and other cultural and educational events, and the space takes part in the annual Museum Night. During the warm season, the tower offers one regular tour per week and events that are held on weekends. Individual tours also offered on weekdays. During the cold season, the tower is closed.

Yekaterinburg annual city architectural festival is called "White Tower", and as part of the II Ural Architectural Biennale in 2012, the French artist Matthieu Martin created a life-size model of the tower for the exhibition.

In 2014, Podelniki, together with the Ural branch of the National Centre for Contemporary Arts, prepared a popularization project, "Cultural Laboratories of the White Tower", for which the Ministry of Culture allocated a regional grant of 2 million rubles. Various stages of this project took place at adjacent sites, and a theatrical performance was shown in the tower itself.

In 2016, Regular tours began grant funds from the Vladimir Potanin Foundation began, as part of the “Changing Museum in a Changing World” program, the former tank was converted to display a circular media panorama dedicated to the construction of Uralmash. In July 2017, lightning struck the solar panels on the roof of the tower, damaging the wiring and mechanism of the media panorama. The fundraising for the installation of lightning protection was supported by the charitable foundation "Vnimanie", created by blogger Ilya Varlamov.

Events held in the tower

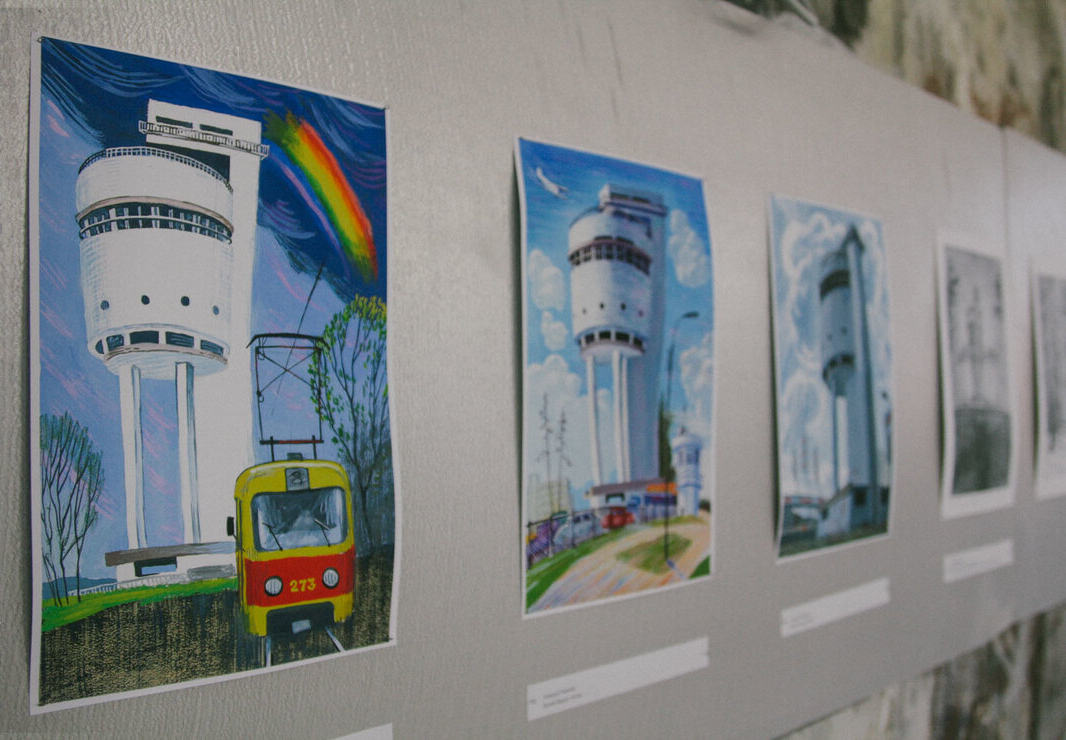

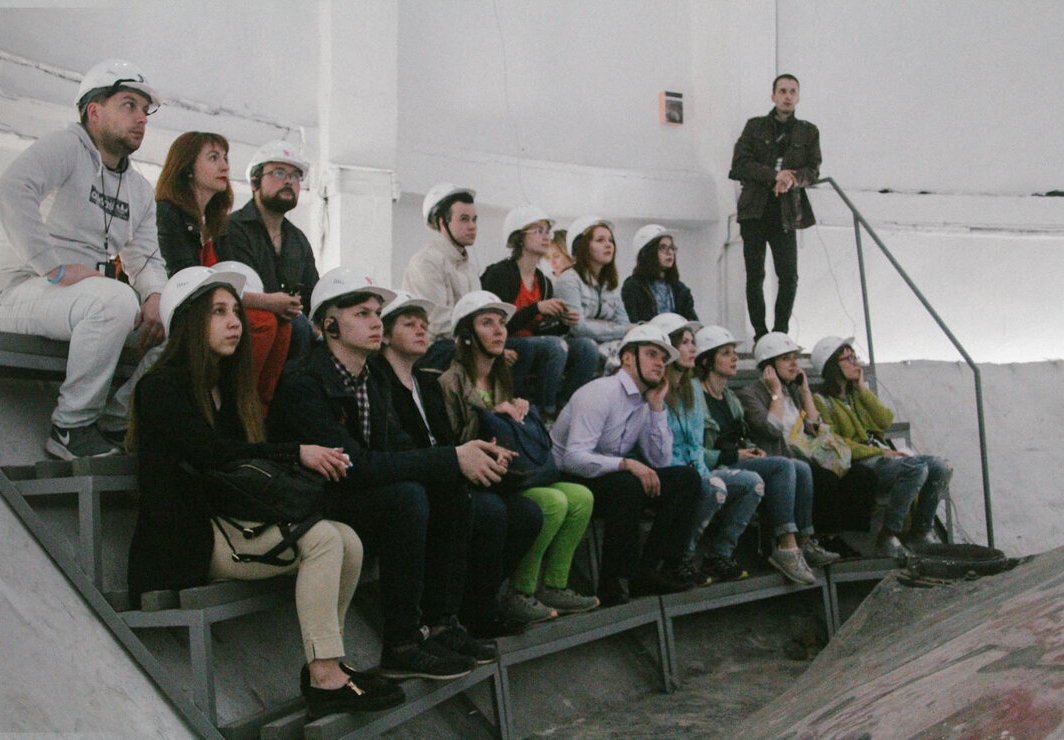

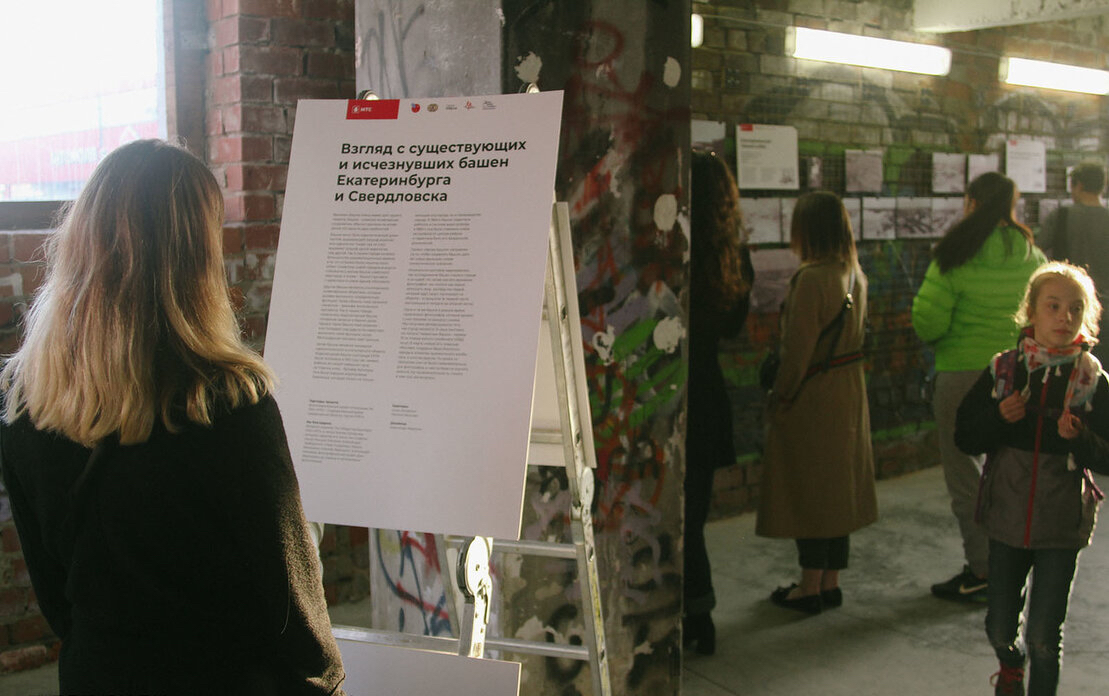

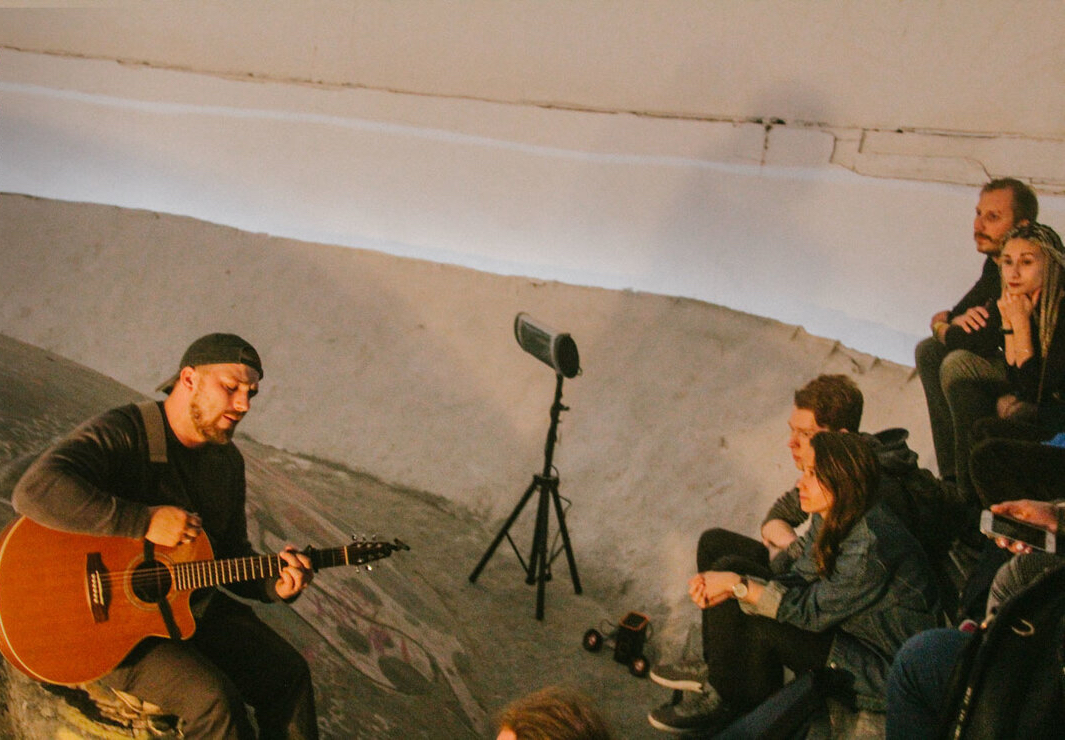

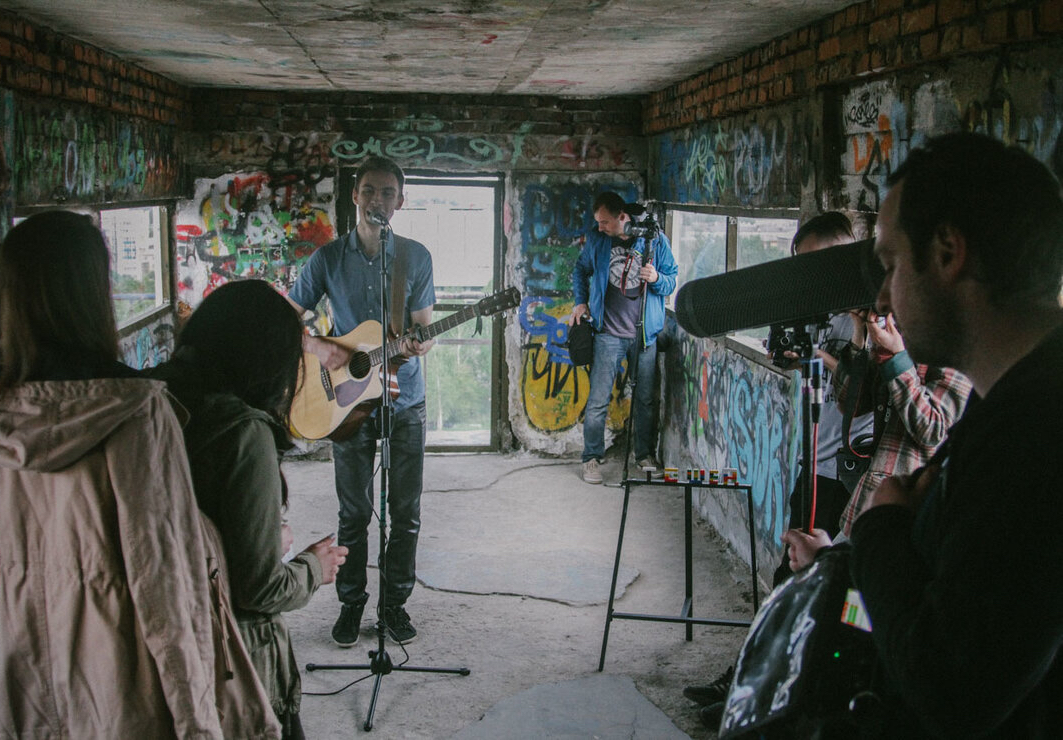

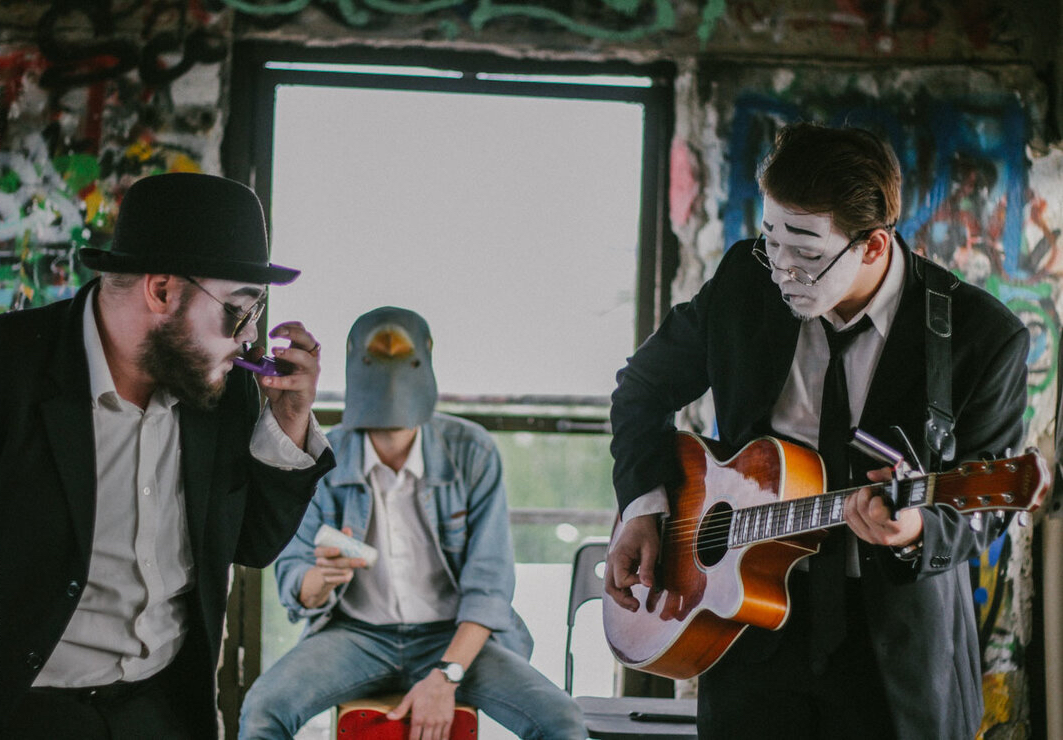
