= Georgi Kulikov =

Georgi Kulikov refers to:

- Georgi Kulikov (swimmer) (born 1947), Latvian swimmer
- Georgi Kulikov (actor) (1924–1995), Russian actor
