= Thrice Resurrected =

- Russian poster
- Russian: Трижды воскресший
- Directed by: Leonid Gaidai
- Written by: Alexander Galich
- Starring: Alla Larionova; Georgi Kulikov; Natalya Medvedeva; Vsevolod Sanayev
- Cinematography: Emil Gulidov
- Music by: Nikita Bogoslovsky
- Release date: 1960
- Country: Soviet Union
- Language: Russian

Thrice Resurrected (Russian: Трижды воскресший) is a 1960 Soviet historical comedy-drama film directed by Leonid Gaidai.

== Plot ==
In 1919, a group of Komsomol members were sent on a tugboat to fight with the White Guards. During the Battle of the Volga people used this ship to transport wounded soldiers and children. And now the pioneers and Komsomol members of the Volga decide to make repairs on the ship and go on it on a journey.

== Cast ==
- Alla Larionova – Svetlana Sergeyevna
- Georgi Kulikov – Arkady Nikolayevich Shmelyov
- Natalya Medvedeva – Anna Mikhailovna Shmelyova
- Vsevolod Sanayev – Ivan Aleksandrovich Starodub
- Konstantin Sorokin – Vasily Vasilyevich Kiselyov
- Nikolay Bogolyubov – Kazansky
- Nadezhda Rumyantseva – Lyubasha Solovyova
- Nina Grebeshkova – Zoya Nikolayevna
- Nikolai Pogodin – Nikolai
- Gennady Pavlov – Anton (voiced by Yuri Sarantsev)
- Leonid Gaidai – inventor (uncredited)
- Nikolai Rybnikov – Nikolai Shmelyov (uncredited)
