= Arkady Pogodin =

Soviet singer

Arkady Solomonovich Pogodin (Russian: Арка́дий Соломо́нович Пого́дин, born Piliver, Russian: Пиливер; 1901, Odessa, Russian Empire — 1975, Moscow, USSR) was a Soviet singer who worked in variety theater and operetta. At 16 years of age, Pogodin started appearing on theater stage in small roles. In 1922 he moved to Moscow, where he started working in small variety theaters performing funny songs. In 1924 he was already appearing on the stage of the prestigious Hermitage Theater. In 1938 Pogodin was invited to sing the lead role of Albert in an operetta titled Delicate Diplomacy ("Тонкая дипломатия" by Johann Strauss) at the Moscow Theater of Miniatures; he performed at the theater in the 1938–1939 season. Then he accidentally met theater director A. Arnold who invited him to sing the lead role in the operetta Chocolate Soldier (based on a work by Bernard Shaw, with music by the Pokrass brothers) that was set to open the 1939 summer season in the CDKA park. The operetta, which played in the park for a month, featured many famous artists including the Alexander Tsfasman Jazz Orchestra, Maria Mironova, etc. After that Tsfasman invited Pogodin to perform with his orchestra in the Khudozestvenny movie theater and on Saturdays and Sundays after midnight on the radio. Pogodin also recorded a number of gramophone records. And here composer and friend Konstantin Listov offered Pogodin to become the first artist to sing a new song he wrote. The song, titled "V Parke Chair" ("В парке Чаир"), instantly made "widely known in narrow circles" Pogodin a popular and trendy singer. In December 1939, he decided to take part in the first All-Russian Variety Artists Contest and became a Laureat along with such singers as Klavdiya Shulzhenko, Keto Dzhaparidze, etc. Since then he toured a lot and continued to sing on the radio. His gramophone records were very popular. Among his songs that were played everywhere were: "V Parke Chair", "Vozvrata Net" ("Возврата нет"), "Ya Zhdu Pisma" ("Я жду письма"), "Oglyanis" ("Оглянись"). Football matches at the time would usually open with his song "Schastlivy Dozhdik" ("Счастливый дождик").

== Family ==
Arcady Pogodin was the third husband of actress Olga Aroseva. They married when he was almost 70 and she 24 years younger and stayed together until his death in 1975.
