= Spring on Zarechnaya Street =

- Directed by: Feliks Mironer; Marlen Khutsiev
- Written by: Feliks Mironer
- Starring: Nina Ivanova; Nikolai Rybnikov
- Cinematography: Pyotr Todorovsky; Radomir Vasilevskiy
- Music by: Boris Mokrousov
- Production company: Odessa Film Studio
- Release date: November 26, 1956
- Running time: 96 min.
- Country: Soviet Union
- Language: Russian

Spring on Zarechnaya Street (Russian: Весна на Заречной улице, romanized: Vesna na Zarechnoy ulitse, Ukrainian: Весна на Зарічній вулиці, romanized: Vesna na Zarichniy vulytsi) is a 1956 Soviet romantic drama film produced at the Odessa Film Studio and directed by Feliks Mironer and Marlen Khutsiev. The film was one of the most popular pictures in the Soviet Union, it was seen by 30,12 million viewers.

Takes the 45th position in the list of the 100 best films in the history of Ukrainian cinema.

== Plot ==
The film takes place in the 1950s in a small working village, where the graduate of a pedagogical institute Tatyana Levchenko (Nina Ivanova) arrives. In the city department of education she receives a referral to an evening school. She is to teach the Russian language and literature at the school for the working youth.

Nikolay Krushenkov (Gennadi Yukhtin), an old friend of Tatyana and an engineer of a metallurgical plant, helps her rent a room and get acquainted with future students. At school Tatyana Sergeyevna becomes a form teacher of the eighth grade, in which Alexander Savchenko (Nikolai Rybnikov), a smelter, udarnik, joker and the favorite of factory girls is enrolled. Sasha immediately falls in love with the new teacher and in order to attract her attention he persists in talking and flirting with her even during the lessons.

However, Tatyana ignores his signs of attention. Sasha, accustomed to easy victories, is surprised by the girl's behavior, and his interest soon turns into resentment. Feeling hurt, Savchenko decides that the educated and intelligent Tatyana is contemptuous of him, a simple boy, a worker-steelmaker who has only completed seven grades, and that she considers him unworthy of her attention. In addition, he mistakes Tatyana's friendship with Krushenkov for a romantic relationship. Resentful and jealous, Alexander drops out of school and tries to forget Tatyana, but soon realizes that he really loves her.

== Cast ==
- Nina Ivanova as Tatyana Levchenko, teacher of Russian language and literature
- Nikolai Rybnikov as Sasha Savchenko, the foremost steelman
- Vladimir Gulyaev as Yura Zhurchenko, Sasha's friend
- Yuri Belov as Zhenya Ishchenko
- Valentina Pugacheva as Zina
- Marina Gavrilko as Marya Gavrilovna, mother of Zina
- Gennadi Yukhtin as Nikolai Nikolaevich Krushenkov, engineer
- Rimma Shorokhova as Alya Alyoshina
- Nikolay Klyuchnev as Fedya Donchenko, Sasha's friend
- Valentin Bryleev as Ivan Migulko

== Production ==
After graduating in 1952 from the Institute of Cinematography, Marlen Khutsiev became a director at the Odessa Film Studio. Working as an assistant director in various film groups, he wrote the script for his first feature film. The initial version of the script was not accepted for the production and Khutsiev had to finish it together with Mironer, co-author of his thesis film. In the post-war period, the Odessa Film Studio became the base where many people came to make films. Director of the studio Alexander Gorsky invited Marlen Khutsiev and Felix Mironer to the studio. One of Gorsky's conditions was that they work together. Filming began in 1953, and the premiere of the film took place on November 26, 1956. With the film "Spring on Zarechnaya Street" Khutsiev paved the way for a new generation of actors: it was the film debut of VGIK graduates Yuri Belov, Nikolai Rybnikov, Gennadi Yukhtin. The role of teacher Tatyana Sergeevna was played by non-professional actress Nina Ivanova.

Most of the filming took place in Zaporozhye. Some scenes were shot in Odessa (for example, in the park "Victory"). In Zaporozhye, the filming was conducted at Zaporizhstal and Dneprospetsstal plants. In addition to the factory scenes, the film crew also worked in the 47th and 4th high schools of working youth in Pavlo-Kichkas, in the park "Dubovaya Roshcha", the district military enlistment office, the Palace of Culture of the aluminum plant (in the Soviet era - the Palace of Culture named after S.M. Kirov).

Nikolai Rybnikov was helped to get into character by 23-year-old Grigory Pometun, who later became a well-deserved steel-maker of Ukrainian SSR.

At the end of 1956 the film became a box-office leader and gathered more than 30 million viewers, losing out only to the Italian melodrama A Husband for Anna by Giuseppe De Santis. The film was awarded a bronze medal at the VI Festival of Youth and Students in 1957 in Moscow.

== Songs ==
External videos
- When Spring Will Come, I Don't Know (1963)

Translation	Original title	Transliterated title	Performer
When Spring Will Come, I Don't Know	«Когда весна придёт, не знаю»	Kogda vesna pridyot, ne znayu	Nikolai Rybnikov
School Waltz	«Школьный вальс»	Shkol'nyi val's	Vladimir Bunchikov
Yura's Song ("Everything goes smoothly in my life...")	«Песня Юры (У меня идёт всё в жизни гладко...)»	Pesnya Yury (U menya idyot vsyo v zhizni gladko	Vladimir Gulyaev
