= Gennadi Yukhtin =

Russian actor (1932–2022)

- Gennadi Yukhtin at the farewell ceremony with People's Artist of the Russian Federation Anatoly Kuznetsov at the Cinema House of the Union of Cinematographers in Moscow
- Born: Geniy Gavrilovich Yukhtin; 30 March 1932; Chubovka village, Kinelsky District, Kuibyshev region, RSFSR, USSR
- Died: 18 February 2022 (aged 89); Moscow, Russia
- Occupation: Actor
- Years active: 1955–2022

Gennadi (birth name Geniy) Gavrilovich Yukhtin (Russian: Геннадий (Гений) Гаврилович Юхтин; 30 March 1932 – 18 February 2022) was a Russian film and stage actor.

== Life and career ==
At the age of fourteen, Yukhtin was orphaned: his mother died at the front during the Second World War in 1942, and his father died of wounds in 1946. He ended up in a special orphanage for the children of dead army and navy officers. Later he ended up in the Volga region, where the teacher, a former actress, introduced her pupils to amateur art. Then Yukhtin became seriously interested in theatrical art.

Yukhtin graduated from the All-Union State Institute of Cinematography. Since 1955, he has been an actor at the National Film Actors' Theatre. He appeared in more than 100 films between 1955 and 1991.

== Death ==
Yukhtin tested positive for COVID-19 on 27 January 2022. He was hospitalized in critical condition on 11 February and died on 18 February 2022, at the age of 89.

== Selected filmography ==
- Other People's Relatives (1956)
- Criminal Case of Rumyantsev (1956)
- Spring on Zarechnaya Street (1956)
- Ballad of a Soldier (1959)
- Zhavoronok (1964)
- The Hockey Players (1964)
- The Elusive Avengers (1967)
- The Andromeda Nebula (1967)
- Nikolay Bauman (1967)
- Dead Season (1968)
- The Brothers Karamazov (1969)
- This Merry Planet (1973)
- Siberiade (1979)
- Semyon Dezhnev (1983)
- Chernobyl: The Final Warning (1991)

== Honors and awards ==
- 1976: Honored Artist of the RSFSR
- 1994: People's Artist of Russia
- 2008: Order "For Merit to the Fatherland", 4th class
