= This Merry Planet =

- Written by: Dmitri Ivanov; Yuri Saakov
- Directed by: Yuri Saakov; Yuri Tsvetkov
- Starring: Viktor Sergachyov; Leonid Kuravlyov; Yekaterina Vasilyeva; Savely Kramarov; Natalya Krachkovskaya
- Music by: David Tukhmanov
- Country of origin: Soviet Union
- Original language: Russian

Production
- Cinematography: Konstantin Petrichenko
- Running time: 94 minutes
- Production company: Mosfilm

Original release
- Release: 1973

This Merry Planet (Russian: Эта весёлая планета, romanized: Eta vesyolaya planeta) is a 1973 Soviet science fiction-musical television film directed by Yuri Saakov and Yuri Tsvetkov.

== Plot ==
On the eve of the New Year a delegation from space arrives on Earth. The aliens find it difficult to understand what is happening on the planet. By chance they end up at a party of a Soviet scientific research organization.

The aliens are convinced that they will immediately become the center of attention, but, as everyone is dressed up in costumes, their appearance at the evening in the House of Culture does not cause any excitement. They try to prove their extraterrestrial origin, but no one believes them. One young astronomer is trying to bring this extraordinary event to the audience, but also to no avail, and additionally he is deeply mistaken — he mistook earthling (Saveliy Kramarov) for an alien as he was dressed as a "perpetuum mobile".

And only by midnight some of the aliens realize that they had discovered the most beautiful planet in the universe, where people know how to love, rejoice and be sad.

== Cast ==
- Viktor Sergachyov — X, the commander of the spaceship aliens
- Leonid Kuravlyov — Y, a crew member of the alien ship
- Yekaterina Vasilyeva — Z, alien woman, crew member of the alien ship
- Savely Kramarov — Prokhor, "perpetuum mobile"
- Natalya Krachkovskaya — "Butterfly"
- Vladimir Nosik — Valerik, "Stargazer"
- Yelena Maksimova — Prokhor's mother
- Larisa Barabanova — "Little Red Riding Hood"
- Alexander Vokach — Pal Palych, elderly animator
- Igor Kashintsev — "Pirate"
- Yuri Demich — episode
- Mikhail Ezepov — the scientist—physicist
- Valentin Golubenko — "Ilya Muromets"
- Gennadi Yukhtin — "Pinocchio"
- Vladimir Mulyavin — cameo

== Production ==
=== Cast ===
Valery Nosik auditioned for the role of Prokhor; as a result, Savely Kramarov was approved, who was "fooling around from the heart" on the set. As Leonid Kuravlev said: "You better not shoot with dogs and with Kramarov. They will outplay you anyway".

=== Filming ===
The initial scene of the aliens' arrival was filmed in the backyard of the Mosfilm studio, where there was a windfall covered with snow. The actors made the most primitive spacesuits: made of silver fabric and glass caps, with a zipper in the whole back (that is, the suit could not be removed alone). During the filming, Kuravlev joked a lot; so, during the break, he ran into the neighboring pavilion where "The Red Snowball Tree" was filming; seizing the moment when Vasily Shukshin, after playing the episode, went to the camera, Kuravlev in a "spacesuit" sat in his place and repeated his speech word for word, and "earned" Shukshin did not immediately understand what was happening, and the film crew roared with laughter.

According to the scenario, the musicians of "Pesniary", standing at the entrance doors, greeted guests in fancy dress with bows. Everything was going well, but when, according to the memoirs of bassist Leonid Tyshko, a policeman appeared in the doorway, the musicians, still in the character, pushed him into the corridor with bows. It turned out that the policeman was an actor as well. The audience was overcome with laughter, but this episode was not included in the picture — the scene was reshot.

== Soundtrack ==
External videos
- Our Beloved Ones

External videos
- White Dance

Translation	Original title	Transliterated title	Performer
White Dance	«Белый танец»	Belyi tanets	Tatyana Sashko
Our Beloved Ones	«Наши любимые»	Nashi Lyubimye	Pesniary
In the Land of Fairy Tales	«В стране сказок»	V strane skazok	Vladimir Malchenko
Shatritsa	«Шатрица»	Shatritsa	Trio «Romen»
On the Most Perfect of Planets	«На самой совершенной из планет»	Na samoy sovershennoy iz planet	Victor Sergachev & Leonid Kuravlyov
A Heart Must Love	«Сердце любить должно»	Serdtse lyubit' dolzhno	Janina Brazaitiene
A Song About Perpetual Motion	«Песня о вечном движении»	Pesnya o vechnom dvizhenii	Dmitriy Ivanov

The song of Valerik "In the land of fairy tales" is performed by Vladimir Malchenko. The screenwriter Dmitry Ivanov sang for Savely Kramarov in the film, Tatiana Sashko sang for Larisa Barabanova, and Alla Pugacheva was supposed to sing for Ekaterina Vasilyeva, but David Tukhmanov rejected her.

The soundtrack was partly released in 1974 by Melodiya.
