= Jurášek =

1957 film

- Directed by: Miroslav Cikán
- Starring: Karel Hašler jr., Vladimir Gulyaev, and Karel Höger.
- Production company: Studio Umeleckých Filmů Praha
- Release date: 1957
- Running time: 85 minutes
- Country: Czechoslovakia

Jurášek is a 1957 Czechoslovak drama film, directed by Miroslav Cikán. It stars Karel Hašler jr., Vladimir Gulyaev, and Karel Höger.
