= Yelena Maksimova =

Soviet actress

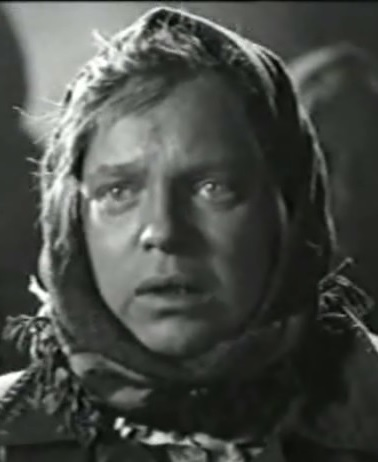
- Born: Yelena Aleksandrovna Maksimova; 23 November 1905; Moscow, Russian Empire
- Died: 23 September 1986 (aged 80); Moscow, USSR
- Occupation: actress
- Years active: 1926—1984
- Spouse: Georgy Nikolaevich Lukyanov

Yelena Aleksandrovna Maksimova (Russian: Еле́на Алекса́ндровна Макси́мова; November 23, 1905 – September 23, 1986) was a Soviet film actress, Honored Artist of the RSFSR (1958).

== Selected filmography ==
- Women of Ryazan (1927) as Lukerya
- The Last Attraction (1929) as Polly
- An Hour with Chekhov (1929) as housemaid
- Earth (1930) as Natalya, Vasili's fiancée
- And Quiet Flows the Don (1930) as Daria Melekhova
- Aerograd (1935) as Maria Kudina
- The Nightingale (1936) as Tanya
- Timur and His Team (1940) as a woman selling milk
- First-Year Student (1948) as flower girl
- The Young Guard (1948) as Valeriya Borts's mother
- Bountiful Summer (1951) as Kolodchka
- Admiral Ushakov (1953) as Senyavinova
- The Frigid Sea (1954) as Dergachikha
- Two Captains (1955) as aunt Dasha
- Other People's Relatives (1955) as Varvara Stepanovna
- The Grasshopper (1955) as peasant woman from Glukhov
- For the Power of the Soviets (1956) as Natalia's mother
- A Crazy Day (1956) as episode
- The Height (1957) as Berestova
- Sasha Enters Life (1957) as Sasha's mother
- Trubachyov's Detachment Is Fighting (1957) as Baba Ivga
- And Quiet Flows the Don (1958) as Koshevoy's mother
- A Home for Tanya (1960) as Markarikha
- Chronicle of Flaming Years (1961) as episode
- Probation (1960) as victim of crime
- Yevdokiya (1961) as Maryushka
- Introduction to Life (1962) as landlord
- No Fear, No Blame (1962) as janitor
- Seven Nannies (1963) as controller
- It Happened at the Police Station (1963) as Alevtina Borisovna
- Father of a Soldier (1964) as Borya's granny
- At Early Morning (1965) as Dimka's mother
- Beloved (1965) as Nina Petrovna
- The Polynin Case (1970) as housekeeper in the Balakirevs house
- This Merry Planet (1973) as Prokhor's mother
- The Red Snowball Tree (1973) as guest of the Baikalovs
- The Sky Is Beyond the Clouds (1973) as Yevgeny's mother
- Sea Cadet of Northern Fleet (1973) as woman in the police
- Investigation Held by ZnaToKi. At Any Сost (1977) as Praskovya Andreevna
- Carnival (1981) as visitor of the pawnshop
- Resident Return (1982) as Utkin's neighbor
- Chance (1984) as Praskovya
