= The Hockey Players =

- Russian film poster
- Russian: Хоккеисты; (Khokkeisty)
- Directed by: Rafail Goldin
- Written by: Yury Trifonov
- Starring: Vyacheslav Shalevich; Vladimir Ivashov; Aleksandr Orlov; Nikolai Rybnikov; Gennadi Yukhtin; Georgiy Zhzhonov; Mikhail Gluzsky; Lyusyena Ovchinnikova; Lev Durov; Viktor Pavlov; Jacov Lenz; Kir Bulychev
- Cinematography: Timofey Lebeshev
- Edited by: Raisa Novikova
- Music by: Leonid Afanasyev
- Production company: Mosfilm
- Distributed by: Mosfilm
- Release date: 1965; (Soviet Union)
- Running time: 100 minutes
- Country: Soviet Union
- Language: Russian

The Hockey Players (Russian: Хоккеисты, romanized: Khokkeisty) is a 1964 Soviet sports drama film written by Yury Trifonov and directed by Raphael Goldin. It had English release in 1965 under the title The Hockey Players, Finnish release as Mestarit, and East German release as Eishockeyspieler.

== Plot ==
Captain of the Raketa hockey team, Anatoly Duganov (Vyacheslav Shalevich), a player decides to fight argue that older players should continue competing as he tries to prove that it is still too early to retire. But in sports, including hockey, for a long time there is a certain stereotype: in 16 years is considered to be more junior player, at 18 years young player in the adult team, and in 25 years, is already a veteran. Following a quarrel with his girlfriend Maya (Elza Lezhdey), Duganov seeks participate in the final match between the two strongest teams and help his team win.

== Cast ==
- Vyacheslav Shalevich as Anatoly Duganov
- Vladimir Ivashov as Morozov
- Aleksandr Orlov as Vladimir Vvedensky
- Nikolai Rybnikov as Coach Lashkov
- Gennadi Yukhtin as Peter Kudrichi
- Georgiy Zhzhonov as Coach Sperantov
- Mikhail Gluzsky as Chairman Ilyin
- Lyusyena Ovchinnikova as Nadia Kudrichi
- Lev Durov as Drunk Fan
- Viktor Pavlov as Episode
- Jakov Lenz as Grandpa at the Kiosk
- Kir Bulychev as Young Sculptor
- Elza Lezhdey as Maya
- Yevgeny Shutov as Coach Christopher I.
- Claudia Polovikova as Nina
- Nikolai Grabbe as Nikolai Yershov
- Nikolai Ozerov as Commentator
- Yura Grishkin as Young Hockey Player
- Alex Guryshev as Ivan Samsonov
- Yulia Dioshi as Lashkov's Wife
- German Kachin as Obsessive Fan
- Viktor Kolpakov as Press Photographer
- Vasily Neschiplenko as Team Doctor

== Reception ==
Rated 7 out of 10 stars, the film is considered a decent representation of Soviet hockey, and interesting for fans of the sport.

== See also ==
- List of films about ice hockey
