= Come Here, Mukhtar! =

- Directed by: Semyon Tumanov
- Written by: Izrail Metter
- Starring: Yuri Nikulin; Dyck; Vladimir Yemelyanov; Leonid Kmit; Yuri Belov
- Cinematography: Alexander Kharitonov
- Edited by: Valentina Kulagina
- Music by: Vladimir Rubin
- Production company: Mosfilm
- Release date: March 13, 1965
- Running time: 78 min
- Country: Soviet Union
- Language: Russian

Come Here, Mukhtar! (Russian: Ко мне, Мухтар!, romanized: Ko mne, Mukhtar!) is a 1965 drama film directed by Semyon Tumanov.

== Plot ==
An East European Shepherd is found abandoned in a rail car, and nicknamed Mukhtar. Junior Police Lieutenant Nikolay Glazychev (Yuri Nikulin) was summoned to the station, freed the dog from the car and delivered him to the police kennel. The owner was found, but she refuses to take Mukhtar and sells him to militsiya for 100 rubles. Mukhtar is assigned to Glazychev, who begins to train him into a service dog. Mukhtar gradually gets accustomed to Glazychev and, albeit with some difficulties, completed his training.

Mukhtar's service with Glazychev begins as they primarily deal with household crimes. The crimes solved with the help of Mukhtar, though small, were numerous; ultimately, the amount of stolen goods recovered with Mukhtar's help exceed 3 million Soviet rubles.

In winter, Mukhtar and Glazychev are on the trail of a dangerous criminal, Frolov, who has committed murder. They encounter two of his henchmen and apprehend them. Frolov asks for shelter in a village, and when asked to show his documents, he injures a kolkhoz guard. A heavy snowstorm obscures the killer's tracks, but Mukhtar tracks him to a train station. Frolovtakes cover in a train car and fires back. The task force commander decides to let Mukhtar in, but upon hearing the criminal's gunshots, Mukhtar breaks free from his leash, rushes into the car, and, despite being seriously wounded, bites out the criminal's throat. The doctor manages to save Mukhtar's life, but one of the bullets grazed his brain, leaving Mukhtar unable to serve. Despite Glazychev's best efforts, Mukhtar is now at risk of being culled. The kennel director decides to petition to keep the dog on the state payroll. Glazychev spends weeks going from one official to another, receiving refusals everywhere. The police commissioner, remembering Mukhtar's contribution to Frolov's incapacitation, approves Glazychev's petition, and Mukhtar remains at the kennel.

== Production ==
Mukhtar was based on the heroic dog Sultan, who, during his ten years of police service, participated in five thousand operations, apprehended more than a thousand criminals, and recovered stolen property worth a total of three million rubles. After Sultan's death, his body was stuffed and exhibited in the Leningrad Criminal Investigation Museum. In 1959, writer Izrail Metter visited the museum. Being a lover of dogs, Metter became intrigued by the dog's fate and decided to dedicate one of his literary works to him.

Thus Metter wrote the short story Murat, inspired by Sultan, published in 1960 by the Novy Mir magazine. The story proved a success, and Mosfilm commissioned a screenplay, with Metter himself serving as the screenwriter.

== Cast ==
- Yuri Nikulin as Lieutenant Glazychev
- dog Dyke as Mukhtar
- Vladimir Yemelyanov as Sergey Prokofyevich, Colonel, head of nursery
- Leonid Kmit as Stepan Dugovets
- Yuri Belov as Larionov
- Alla Larionova as Masha, Mukhtar's former mistress
- Fyodor Nikitin as veterinarian Zyryanov
- Nikolai Kryuchkov as police Commissioner
- Sergey Golovanov as Admiral Kolesov
- Lev Durov as a thief-recidivist
- Ivan Ryzhov as captain
- Iya Marx as Fyodor's grandmother
- Ekaterina Savinova as Vera
- Vladimir Gulyaev as militia captain
- Vadim Zakharchenko as investigator

== See also ==
- Muhtar's Return
