= The Lark (1965 film) =

1965 Soviet war film

- Croatian poster
- Directed by: Nikita Kurikhin; Leonid Menaker
- Written by: Mikhail Dudin; Sergey Orlov
- Starring: Gennadi Yukhtin; Valeri Pogoreltsev; Valentins Skulme; Bruno Oja; Ervin Abel
- Cinematography: Viktor Karasyov; Nikolai Zhilin
- Edited by: Raisa Izakson
- Music by: Yakov Vaisburd
- Production company: Lenfilm
- Release date: 1 May 1965
- Running time: 91 minutes
- Country: Soviet Union
- Language: Russian

The Lark (Russian: Жаворонок, romanized: Zhavoronok) is a 1965 Soviet World War II film directed by Nikita Kurikhin and Leonid Menaker. It was entered into the 1965 Cannes Film Festival.

It features a story of a T-34 battle tank and its crew who escape from German training ground after being used as a living target practice. The tank becomes the titular lark, roaming through the land, announces incoming end of the Nazi rule, like larks announces the coming of spring.

The film is characteristic for its symbolism with scenes featuring destruction of a German monument in a heart of a city the tank enters, or symbolic destruction of the Wehrmacht when the tank accidentally crashes inside a cinema building and drives through the screen during a German propaganda movie display. The T-34 tank is a symbol itself, being portrayed like an unstoppable, almost god-like creature that inserts fear into occupants by destroying symbols of Nazi rule and enthusiasm into the Soviet captives witnessing its march. Even after its crew is killed, the tank continues its march, driving towards light of the sun.

== Plot ==
The opening sequence states that the film is based on true events.

Set deep within Nazi Germany on June 22, 1942, the story follows the harrowing use of captured Soviet tanks by the Germans as live targets for testing their anti-tank weapons. These "death crews" are composed of Soviet prisoners of war and civilians from concentration camps. The film chronicles the escape of one such tank crew led by Ivan, a skilled mechanic and driver. The crew—consisting of three Red Army soldiers and a fighter from the French Resistance—breaks through enemy lines in a T-34 tank. Along the way, they rescue Soviet women forced into labor and destroy German forces. During their journey, they strike fear into a German town, disrupt its idyllic view of victory, raid supplies, and destroy a monument to a Teutonic knight.

As the crew fights through enemy territory, they suffer losses: the French fighter is killed by a bomb, and two other crew members die after leaving the tank during an attack. In a final act of defiance and humanity, Ivan saves a young German boy crossing the road but is shot dead by German forces moments later.

== Cast ==
- Gennadi Yukhtin
- Valeri Pogoreltsev
- Valentins Skulme
- Bruno Oja
- Ervin Abel
- Heino Mandri
- Lyudmila Glazova
- Lyubov Malinovskaya
