= Izrail Metter =

Izrail Moiseyevich Metter
- Born: Izrail Moiseyevich Metter; 18 October 1909; Kharkiv, Ukraine, Russian Empire
- Died: 7 October 1996 (aged 87); Saint Petersburg, Saint Petersburg Governorate, Russian Federation
- Occupations: novelist; Screenwriter
- Writing career
- Genres: Novel; short story
- Notable work: The Fifth Corner (1989)
- Notable awards: Grinzane Cavour Prize (Italy), 1992

Izrail Moiseyevich Metter (in Russian: Израиль Моисеевич Меттер) (October 18, 1909 [O.S. October 5] – October 7, 1996) was a Soviet writer of Jewish origin. He was born in Kharkiv. One of his best-known books is the novel The Fifth Corner, which he finished writing in 1967, but could not publish until 1989. He received the Grinzane Cavour Prize in 1992 for this book. Other notable works include Genealogy and Muchtar, which was adapted into the film Come Here, Mukhtar! (for which Metter wrote the screenplay). His work has yet to be translated into English. The Fifth Corner of the Room, translated from Russian in 1991 by Michael Duncan (Harvill Press). Metter died in 1996.
