= Other People's Relatives =

- Directed by: Mikhail Schweitzer
- Written by: Vladimir Tendryakov
- Produced by: Pyotr Nikashin
- Starring: Nikolai Rybnikov; Nonna Mordyukova; Nikolai Sergeyev
- Cinematography: Vyacheslav Fastovich
- Music by: Andrey Paschenko
- Production company: Lenfilm
- Release date: 1956
- Running time: 99 minutes
- Country: Soviet Union
- Language: Russian

Other People's Relatives (Russian: Чужая родня, romanized: Chuzhaya rodnya) is a 1956 Soviet drama film directed by Mikhail Schweitzer and based on the story Not to the court by Vladimir Tendryakov.

== Plot ==
The plot — the conflict between the Komsomol, advanced collective farmer Fyodor and his young wife's parents, ardent opponents of the collective farm. A young woman caught between two fires: passionately loved one and family. Not daring to contradict the parent's will, she at first did not find the strength to leave behind her husband from home.

== Cast ==
- Nikolai Rybnikov as Fyodor Gavrilovich Soloveikov
- Nonna Mordyukova as Stesha Ryashkina
- Nikolai Sergeyev as Silanty Petrovich Ryashkin
- Aleksandra Denisova as Alevtina Ryashkina
- Yelena Maksimova as Varvara Stepanovna
- Stepan Krylov as Miron
- Lyubov Malinovskaya as Pelagia, the wife of Miron
- Maya Zabulis as Tosya
- Leonid Kmit as Fedot
- Vladimir Gulyaev as Subbotin
- Yuri Soloviev as Pyotr Chizhov
- Gennadi Yukhtin as Vasya, accordion
- Elena Volskaya as Glazycheva

=== In episodes ===
- Leonid Bykov as teacher Lev Zakharovich
- Georgiy Zhzhonov as guest on the wedding
