= Trembita (film) =

- Russian: Трембита
- Directed by: Oleg Nikolayevsky
- Written by: Mikhail Chervinsky; Vladimir Mass; Oleg Nikolayevsky
- Produced by: Pavel Smerdev
- Starring: Yevgeny Vesnik; Olga Aroseva; Aleksey Chernov; Nikolay Trofimov; Lyudmila Kupina
- Cinematography: Ivan Artyukhov
- Edited by: T. Protopopova
- Music by: Georgiy Milyutin
- Production company: Sverdlovsk Film Studio
- Release date: October 28, 1968
- Running time: 92 min.
- Country: Soviet Union
- Language: Russian

Trembita (Russian: Трембита) is a 1968 Soviet romantic musical film directed by Oleg Nikolayevsky.

The film takes place after the war. The film tells about the former butler of a count who returns to his native village with the hope of finding a treasure and taking possession of it.

== Plot ==
In Uzhhorod, located in the Zakarpattia region of the Ukrainian SSR, shortly after the end of World War II, a former butler named Bohdan Susyk reappears. Susyk had served the count of the Schönborn family, who fled with the retreating German occupiers. Only Susyk knows about a hidden stash where the count concealed his treasures before escaping. Meanwhile, a local operation to clear mines from the surrounding areas, remnants of wartime combat, is underway.

The village youth plans to create a new orchard by demolishing the ruins of the old Schönborn castle. Unbeknownst to them, Susyk sneaks into the castle ruins to search for the hidden treasure. However, an explosion occurs while he is inside. As he escapes the wreckage, Susyk discovers a chest containing the count's "treasures," which turn out to be pre-war securities from the Third Reich and German companies. These papers are now completely worthless in the post-war era. The sappers who arrive on the scene sum it up: "Millions, but only in the past."

== Cast ==
- Yevgeny Vesnik as Bogdan Susik
- Olga Aroseva as Parasya (voiced by Glikeriya Bogdanova-Chesnokova)
- Aleksey Chernov as Atanas
- Nikolay Trofimov as Shik
- Lyudmila Kupina as Vasilina
- Boris Savchenko as Alexey
- Yulia Vukkert as Olesya
- Anatoli Galevsky as Mikola
- Ivan Pereverzev as Prokop, Mikola's father
- Savely Kramarov as Petro
