= Alla Larionova =

Soviet actress (1931–2000)

- Born: Alla Dmitrievna Larionova; 19 February 1931; Moscow, Soviet Union
- Died: 25 April 2000 (aged 69); Moscow, Russia
- Occupation: Actress
- Years active: 1952–2000
- Spouse: Nikolai Rybnikov (m. 1957; died 1990)
- Children: 2

Alla Dmitriyevna Larionova (Russian: Алла Дмитриевна Ларионова; 19 February 1931, in Moscow, USSR – 25 April 2000, in Moscow, Russia) was a Soviet and Russian theater and film actress. People's Artist of the RSFSR (1990). Wife of the People's Artist of the RSFSR Nikolai Rybnikov. They raised two daughters — Alyona from Larionova's previous relationship with Ivan Pereverzev, and their biological child Arina.

She was buried at the Troyekurovskoye Cemetery.

== Selected filmography ==
- Michurin (1948) (uncredited)
- Sadko (1953)
- Hostile Whirlwinds (1953)
- The Anna Cross (1954)
- Twelfth Night (1955)
- The Drummer's Fate (1955)
- Fathers and Sons (1958)
- Thrice Resurrected (1960)
- Come Here, Mukhtar! (1965)
- Nights of Farewell (1965)
- Magician (1967)
