= Ketevan Japaridze =

Ketevan Japaridze ქეთევან ჯაფარიძე (Georgian) Кэто Джапаридзе (Russian)
- Born: Ketevana Konstantinovna Dzhaparidze; February 11, 1901; Kvishkheti, Kutais Governorate, Russian Empire
- Died: September 20, 1968 (aged 67) Tbilisi, Georgian SSR, USSR
- Genres: Russian romance
- Occupation: Singer

Ketevan "Keto" Konstantinovna Japaridze (Georgian: ქეთევან კონსტანტინეს ასული ჯაფარიძე, Russian: Кэтевана Константиновна Джапаридзе; February 11, 1901, Kvishkheti, Kutais Governorate, Russian Empire – September 20, 1968, Tbilisi, Georgian SSR, USSR)was a Georgian Soviet singer who was awarded the title Honored Artist of the Georgian SSR in 1956. (Note: The decree issuing her the title Honored Artist of the Georgian SSR was published in 1956; however, her obituary incorrectly said she was awarded the title in 1965.)

== Biography ==
She went to study at the Tiflis noble gymnasium in 1909, where her powerful voice was noticed by the famous composer Zachary Paliashvili, who worked there as a music teacher and led the school choir.

In 1919, she entered the Tiflis Conservatory.

In 1927, after graduating from the conservatory, she went to Berlin, where she took singing lessons for 3 years. In 1930, she returned to the USSR (Georgia).

In the spring or summer of 1937, Keto made her debut in Moscow, she gave a solo concert on the stage of the Hermitage (Moscow theater of the revolution). Around the same time (in the spring of 1937), she made her debut in Leningrad at the theater of Recreation garden.

In 1939, she was invited to participate in the First all-Union competition of pop artists and received one of the prizes.

During the World War II, Keto had to change her repertoire and started performing patriotic songs. The singer gave many concerts in hospitals and on the front line.

In 1956, Dzhaparidze was awarded the title of Honored Artist of the Georgian SSR.

Keto died on September 20, 1968, and was buried in the Didube Pantheon.
