= Olga Aroseva =

Soviet and Russian actress

- Ольга Аросева
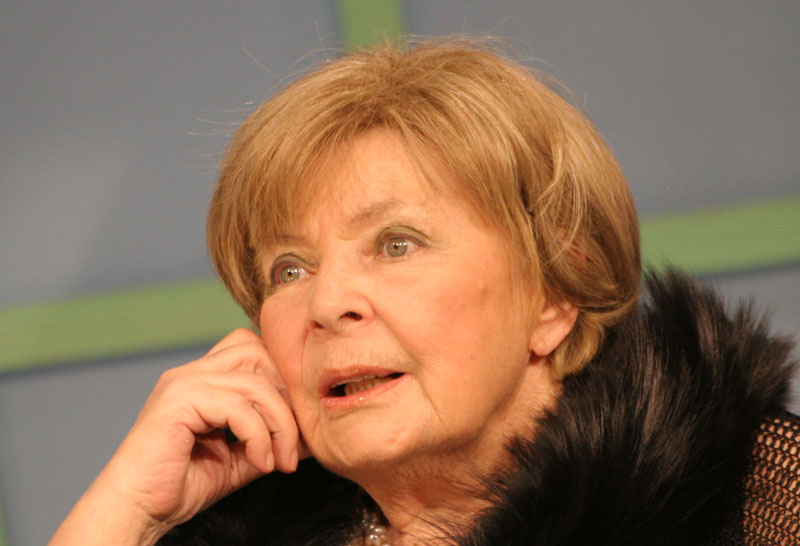
- Aroseva in 2007
- Born: Olga Aleksandrovna Aroseva; 21 December 1925; Moscow, Russian SFSR, Soviet Union
- Died: 13 October 2013 (aged 87); Moscow, Russia
- Occupation: Actress
- Years active: 1946–2013
- Spouse: Vladimir Soshalsky (divorced)
- Father: Aleksandr Arosev

Olga Aleksandrovna Aroseva (Russian: О́льга Алекса́ндровна Аро́сева; 21 December 1925 – 13 October 2013) was a Soviet and Russian actress whose career spanned more than 65 years. Aroseva was better known for her work in theater and for her voice work in animated television shows. In the years before her death, she was best known as a hostess of the Russian educational and variety show Long Time No See. Her movie roles included Beware of the Car.

== Death ==
Aroseva died on 13 October 2013, aged 87, in Moscow, from undisclosed causes.

== Selected filmography ==
Actor

- The Girl Without an Address (Девушка без адреса, 1957) as Neighbor
- Beware of the Car (Берегись автомобиля, 1966) as Lyuba, a trolley-bus driver
- Trembita (Трембита, 1968) as Parasya
- Two Days of Miracles (Два дня чудес, 1970) as Alfa Kokoshkina
- Grandads-Robbers (Старики-разбойники, 1971) as Anna Pavlovna
- Unbelievable Adventures of Italians in Russia (Невероятные приключения итальянцев в России, 1974) as Andrey's mother
- Svaty (Сваты, 2010–2012) as Lyudmila Koteeva

Voice

- The Kitten from the Lizyukov street (1988) as Elephant

== Family ==
Olga Aroseva was married four times. Her third husband was singer Arkady Pogodin (from late 1960s or early 1970s until his death in 1975), and the fourth was actor Vladimir Soshalsky.
