= Nikolai Rybnikov =

Soviet actor

- Николай Рыбников
- Born: Nikolai Nikolayevich Rybnikov; 13 December 1930; Borisoglebsk, RSFSR, Soviet Union
- Died: 22 October 1990 (aged 59); Moscow, Soviet Union
- Occupation: Actor
- Years active: 1951–1990
- Spouse: Alla Larionova (m. 1957)
- Children: 1

Nikolai Nikolayevich Rybnikov (Russian: Никола́й Никола́евич Ры́бников; 13 December 1930 – 22 October 1990) was a Soviet and Russian film actor. People's Artist of the RSFSR (1981).

== Biography ==
=== Early life and education ===
Nikolai Nikolayevich Rybnikov was born on 13 December 1930 in Borisoglebsk, Voronezh Oblast. His father Nikolai Nikolayevich, was a factory fitter and his mother, Klavdiya Aleksandrovna, a housewife. He also had a brother, Vyacheslav.

With the beginning of the Great Patriotic War, Rybnikov the elder went to the front, and the mother took her sons and moved to Stalingrad to her sister, believing that it would be safe there. But from the front they received news of the death of his father. Soon after receiving the tragic news, Klavdiya Aleksandrovna also died.

Nikolai Rybnikov grew up in Stalingrad and graduated from the local railway school. Afterwards, he studied at the Stalingrad Medical Institute for two years, but dropped out since he decided that the profession was not for him.

In 1948, Nikolai went to Moscow to study as an actor and entered VGIK (Sergei Gerasimov's and Tamara Makarova's course). He graduated in 1953. He was an actor of the auxiliary staff of the Stalingrad Drama Theater.

Since 1953, the actor had been employed at the National Film Actors' Theatre.

=== Career ===
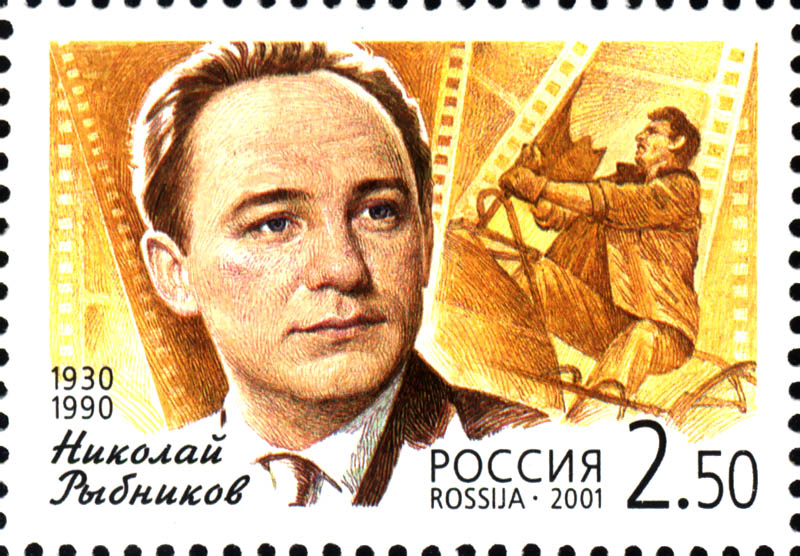
Nikolai Rybnikov on a Russian postage stamp, 2001

His film debut was as Drozdov in The Team from Our Street (1953). The picture went almost unnoticed, however, next year the directors Aleksander Alov and Vladimir Naumov cast him in the film Anxious Youth. Rybnikov's work as laconic Kotka Grigorenko was positively noted by the critics.

His next role was of rural mechanic, Fedor in Mikhail Schweitzer's film Other People's Relatives.

Fame came to the actor after the film Spring on Zarechnaya Street (1956), directed by Feliks Mironer and Marlen Khutsiev. Next year he acted in another successful film, The Height, directed by Aleksandr Zarkhi.

In 1958, Nikolai Rybnikov starred in the Eldar Ryazanov film The Girl Without an Address. Although the public took the film well (it took second place at the box office), it received weak critical reviews. Nevertheless, in 1961 the actor agreed to appear in a comedy again, when director Yuri Chulyukin invited him to the main role of the lumberjack Ilya Kovrigin in the film The Girls. This picture had a huge audience success.

Nikolai Rybnikov became a favorite of audiences in the late 1950s and early 1960s, performing romantic characters of cheerful young men, with integrity and purity revealed through sharp and dramatic relationships with others.

In the following years, Rybnikov acted a lot in film, including in He Submits to the Sky, War and Peace, where he played the role of Vasily Denisov, Liberation, The Hockey Players. The picture The Seventh Heaven (1972) was a great success, in it Nikolai Rybnikov starred with his wife, Alla Larionova.

In the late 1970s and 1980s, the actor was invited to appear less often and only in episodic roles. The most vivid role of Rybnikov of this period is pensioner-squabbler Kondraty Petrovich in the film Marry a Captain (1985), for which he received the Soviet Screen Award in 1986 in the category of best actor in an episode role.

Nikolay Rybnikov died on the morning of 22 October 1990 in his Moscow apartment from a heart attack, a month and a half before his sixtieth birthday. He was buried at the Troyekurovskoye Cemetery.

== Personal life ==
His wife was actress Alla Larionova (1931–2000). He first met her as a student in VGIK. They raised two daughters — Alyona from Larionova's previous relationship with Ivan Pereverzev, and their biological child Arina.

While studying in VGIK, Rybnikov also fell in love with his classmate Klara Rumyanova. However, she didn't like him and never accepted any presents he tried to give her. When Rybnikov tried to give her a very expensive golden watch, Rumyanova slapped him and ordered to stay away from her. After that Rybnikov threw the watch out of the window in fury. Two years before Rybnikov's death, Rumyanova visited him in the hospital, where she apologized for all her rejections and said that Rybnikov was the man she needed.

== Selected filmography ==
- 1954: Mysterious Discovery as Sailor
- 1954: The Team from our Street as Drozdov
- 1954: Substitute Player as Petrov
- 1955: Anxious Youth as Kotka Grigorenko
- 1956: Other People's Relatives as Fyodor Gavrilovich Soloveikov
- 1956: Spring on Zarechnaya Street as Sasha Savchenko
- 1957: The Height as Nikolai Pasechnik
- 1958: The Girl Without an Address as Pasha Gusarov
- 1960: Normandie-Niémen as Captain Tarasenko
- 1962: The Girls as Ilya Kovrigin
- 1963: They Conquer the Skies as Alexei Kolchin, test pilot
- 1965: The Hockey Players as Vasily Lashkov
- 1966: War and Peace I: Andrei Bolkonsky as Denisov
- 1966: War and Peace II: Natasha Rostova as Denisov
- 1966: Uncle's Dream as Pavel Alexandrovich Mozglyakov
- 1967: War and Peace III: The Year 1812 as Denisov
- 1967: War and Peace IV: Pierre Bezukhov as Denisov
- 1968: Wake Up Mukhin as Benkendorf / Titus Valerius / Inquisitor
- 1969: Kierunek Berlin as Polyak
- 1969: Old Friend as Anokhin
- 1970: Liberation I: The Fire Bulge as Major-General Panov
- 1970: Liberation II: Breakthrough as Major-General Panov
- 1971: Liberation III: Direction of the Main Blow as Major-General Panov
- 1972: The Circle as Viktor Vasiltsev
- 1972: Marble House as Mamochko
- 1974: Because I Love as Roman Ignatyevich Belyy
- 1975: Ivanov's Family as Ivan Ivanovich Ivanov
- 1976: Fun for Oldies as Nepeivoda, accordionist
- 1977: A Second Attempt of Victor Krokhin as Fyodor Ivanovich
- 1977: I Have an Idea! as Prince Potyomkin
- 1981: Bless You, Dear as Nikolai Yerofeyev
- 1985: Marry a Captain as Kondraty Petrovich
- 1987: Night Crew as Nikitin
- 1989: Private Detective, or Operation Cooperation as MP candidate
- 1990: Get Thee Out as Innkeeper Nikifor
- 1991: Izydi! as Nikifor (final film role)

== Awards ==
- Honored Artist of the RSFSR (1964)
- People's Artist of the RSFSR (1981)
- Soviet Screen Award (1986) — best actor in an episode role
