= The Girl Without an Address =

- Девушка без адреса
- Directed by: Eldar Ryazanov
- Written by: Leonid Lench
- Starring: Svetlana Karpinskaya; Nikolai Rybnikov; Erast Garin; Vasili Toporkov; Yuri Belov; Svetlana Shcherbak
- Cinematography: Aleksandr Kharitonov
- Music by: Anatoly Lepin
- Production company: Mosfilm
- Release date: March 8, 1958
- Running time: 90 min.
- Country: Soviet Union
- Language: Russian

The Girl Without an Address (Russian: Девушка без адреса, romanized: Devushka bez adresa)) is a 1957 Soviet romantic comedy film directed by Eldar Ryazanov and written by Leonid Lench. Produced during the Khrushchev Thaw, it stars Svetlana Karpinskaya and Nikolai Rybnikov.

The film tells the story of a young construction worker who searches tirelessly through Moscow for the spirited girl he met on a train, while she embarks on her own journey of self-discovery through a series of odd jobs and misadventures.

== Plot ==
Young construction worker Pasha Gusarov meets a strong-willed girl, Katya Ivanova, on a train. At first, their interactions are rocky, but by the end of the journey, they decide they don't want to part ways. However, leaving the train through different doors, they fail to meet at the station. The only clue Pasha has about Katya's whereabouts is a fragment of her grandfather's address, starting with "Nikolo...". Despite the enormity of Moscow, Pasha embarks on a determined search, calculating that visiting every possible "Nikolo..." address might take three years.

Meanwhile, Katya stays with her grandfather, who works as a janitor at the district council. After failing to become an actress at the Operetta Theater, Katya takes a job as an elevator operator in her building. Following a quarrel with her grandfather, she leaves home to prove she can succeed on her own.

Katya tries various jobs. She quits as a housemaid after a flood caused by her employer's husband. She works in road maintenance and as a model, but leaves the latter job after a chance sighting of Pasha outside the window during a fashion show. She chases after him in a show dress but fails to catch up, prompting her resignation.

Katya's friend helps her secure a courier position at a "transfer office." However, she does not stay long, convincing the management that their office is redundant within the national economy. The office is shut down, and the employees are reassigned to construction work. Katya, however, decides to leave Moscow entirely.

At the very train station where she and Pasha had parted ways, they finally reunite.

== Cast ==
- Svetlana Karpinskaya as Katya Ivanova
- Nikolai Rybnikov as Pasha Gusarov
- Erast Garin as Grandfather
- Vasili Toporkov as Cloakroom attendant
- Yuri Belov as Mitya
- Svetlana Shcherbak as Olya
- Zoya Fyodorova as Komarinskaya
- Sergey Filippov as Komarinsky
- Rina Zelyonaya as Yelizaveta Timofeyevna
- Pavel Tarasov as Commandant
- Svetlana Kharitonova as Klava
- Olga Aroseva as Neighbour
- Georgiy Georgiu as Tenant
- Georgi Tusuzov as Feoktistych
- Lidiya Korolyova as Yekaterina Ivanova
- Valentina Ananina as Secretary
- Irina Murzaeva as Conductor
- Irina Gubanova as Neighbour
- Mikhail Garkavi as Actor stuck in the elevator
- Marina Figner as Fashion Designer
