= Udarnik =

Soviet term for an exceptionally high productivity worker

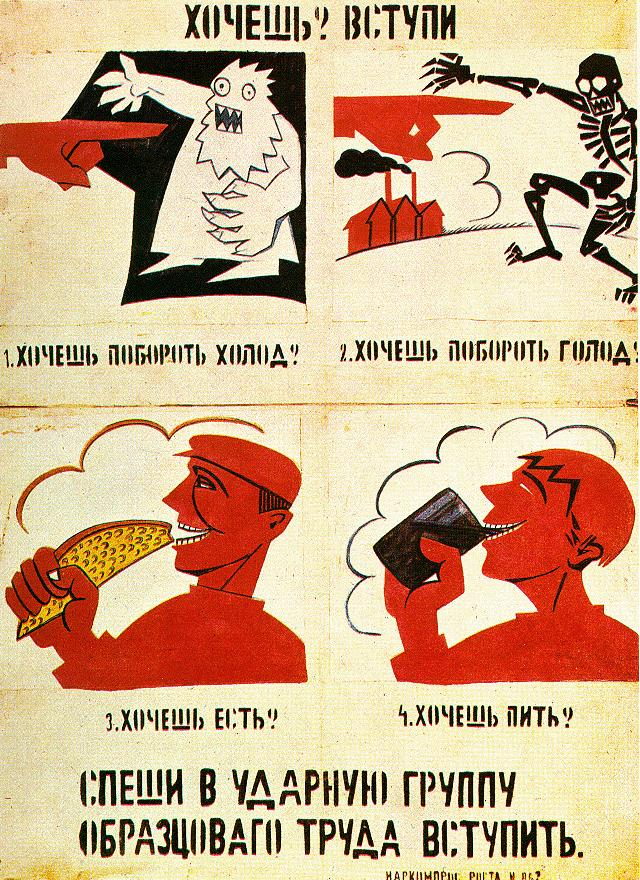
Agitprop poster by Vladimir Mayakovsky: "Hurry to join shock brigades!" – Do you want it? Then join. 1. Want to defeat cold? 2. Want to defeat hunger? 3. Want to eat? 4. Want to drink? Hurry, join the advanced exemplary labour group.

In the terminology of the Soviet Union, the Eastern Bloc, and other communist countries, an udarnik (/uːˈdɑːrnɪk/, plural udarniks or udarniki; Russian: уда́рник, IPA: [ʊˈdarnʲɪk]), also known in English as a shock worker or strike worker (collectively known as shock brigades or a shock labor team) is a high productivity worker. It derived from the expression "udarny trud" for "superproductive, enthusiastic labor".

== Soviet Union ==
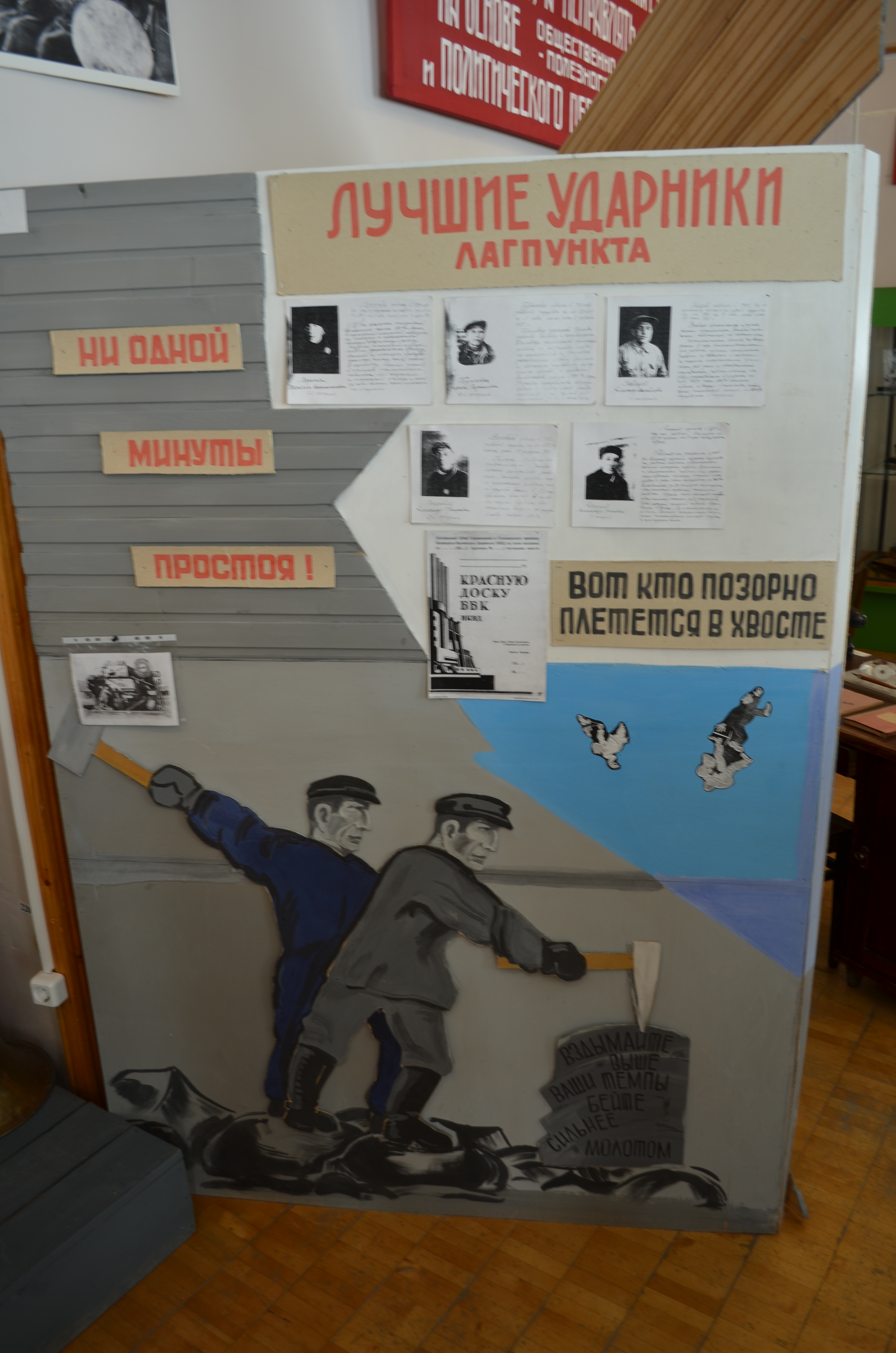
"Udarnik Board of Fame", an exposition based on agitprop from Gulag camps at the Medvezhyegorsk museum

In the Soviet Union, the term was linked to Shock worker of Communist Labour (Ударник коммунистического труда), a Soviet honorary title, as well as Alexey Stakhanov and the movement named after him. However, the terminology of shock workers has also been used in other socialist states, most notably in the People's Republic of China, North Korea, the People's Republic of Bulgaria, and the Socialist Federal Republic of Yugoslavia.

Soviet shock workers were not always necessarily citizens of the USSR, as one British communist and trade union leader Jessie Eden, was elected one at the Stalin automotive plant (later renamed the ZiL automotives).

The hope behind promoting shock labour was that through socialist emulation the rest of the workforce would learn from the vanguard.

The Soviet Union promoted shock work during the First Five-Year Plan period in an effort to increase productivity through human effort in the absence of more developed machinery.

Cultural theorist Susan Buck-Morss contrasts shock work's stimulation of productivity in rushes of labor with the standardization of Taylorism.

== In Poland ==
In People's Republic of Poland a similar title was przodownik pracy (translated into English as "model worker"), a calque from another Soviet/Russian term peredovik proizvodstva, literally "leader in production". Seen as the Polish version of the Stakhanovite movement, famous Polish workers given the title of przodownik pracy included Piotr Ożański and especially the "Polish Stakhanov" Wincenty Pstrowski, a miner who in 1947 achieved 270 percent expected efficiency per month. Later Pstrowski died due to misconducted dental intervention, but in official propaganda, it was due to deadly exhaustion.

== In Czechoslovakia ==
In the Czechoslovak Socialist Republic, an udarnik was called úderník (with slightly different pronunciation in the Czech and Slovak languages). Úderníci were elite workers who surpassed their work quotas and were used by the Party as propaganda. This breaking of production quotas, while usually real and often reaching astounding heights of the order of several hundred percent, was achieved at the cost of substandard quality, lack of work safety regulations and lack of concern for personal health. Most importantly, úderníci usually did not perform any minor tasks mandated by the job standards they were supposed to follow. These tasks were performed by other workers, yet this work counted towards the úderník's quota.
