= Grandads-Robbers =

- Directed by: Eldar Ryazanov
- Written by: Emil Braginsky; Eldar Ryazanov
- Produced by: Mosfilm
- Starring: Yuri Nikulin; Yevgeniy Yevstigneyev; Olga Aroseva; Georgi Burkov; Andrei Mironov
- Cinematography: Nikolay Nemolyaev; Genrey Abramyan
- Music by: Andrei Petrov
- Release date: 7 August 1972
- Running time: 87 minutes
- Country: Soviet Union
- Language: Russian

Old Robbers (Russian: Старики́–разбо́йники, romanized: Stariki-razboyniki, lit. "elderly bandits") is a 1972 Soviet crime comedy-drama by Eldar Ryazanov, filmed on Mosfilm. The movie title resembles the name of a Russian children's traditional yard game Cossacks-Robbers (Russian: казаки–разбойники, romanized: kazaki-razboyniki).

== Plot ==
In the twilight of his career, investigator Nikolai Sergeyevich Myachikov faces forced retirement to make way for the politically favored Yuri Proskudin. Unwilling to step aside, he is given one final month by his boss, Prosecutor Fedor Fedyaev, to prove his worth. Around the same time, Myachikov’s close friend, engineer Valentin Petrovich Vorobyov, also prepares to retire but decides to stay after a heartfelt farewell from his colleagues. Understanding Myachikov’s struggle, Vorobyov suggests they commit a “crime of the century” for Myachikov to heroically solve, securing his position by showing his boss that he can still effectively investigate complex crimes. Their first plot, the theft of a Rembrandt painting from a museum, goes awry when no one notices the painting’s absence. Disheartened but undeterred, Vorobyov then proposes they fake a robbery involving his neighbor, Anna Pavlovna, a bank courier. However, when Vorobyov falls ill, Myachikov attempts the heist solo, only to encounter a real thief and lose the stolen money.

In an effort to recover the lost cash and avoid suspicion, Myachikov sells off his belongings but remains short of the total amount. Anna Pavlovna, growing suspicious, accuses him of embezzlement, though only Vorobyov understands his friend's intentions and offers him his life savings with the plea, "Let’s live and die honestly." As Myachikov’s world unravels, Fedyaev begins to sense his genuine struggle but still doubts the full truth. In a final act of integrity, Myachikov “arrests” himself, retreating into a dream of a court where justice prevails. The film concludes with him leaving the police station one snowy evening, where Anna and Vorobyov are waiting for him. Together, they walk into the snowy night, reflecting a quiet acceptance of friendship, honesty, and an imperfect resolution.

== Cast ==
- Yuri Nikulin — Nikolay Sergeevitch Myachikov
- Yevgeny Yevstigneyev — Valentin Petrovich Vorobyov
- Olga Aroseva — Anna Pavlovna Suzdaleva
- Georgi Burkov — Fyodor Fyodorovitch Fedyaev
- Andrei Mironov — Yury Yevgenyevitch Proskudin
- Valentina Vladimirova — Masha, Vorobyov's wife
- Yuri Belov — Petya, militsiaman
- Roman Filippov — robber
- Nina Agapova — museum keeper
- Irina Murzaeva — old museum keeper
- Lev Durov — driver of the collector car
- Boris Runge — shoes shop director
- Gotlib Roninson — doctor
- Yuri Smirnov — locksmith
- Georgi Kulikov — Vorobyov's colleague
- Viktor Bajkov — Vorobyov's colleague
- Yevgeni Perov — Vorobyov's colleague
- Natalya Sajko — Vorobyov's colleague
- Boris Vladimirov — Vorobyov's colleague
- Aleksandr Shirvindt — spokesman of the minister
- Eldar Ryazanov — Myachikov's colleague
- Yuri Yakovlev — narrator (voice)
