= Kvishkheti =

Kvishkheti ქვიშხეთი
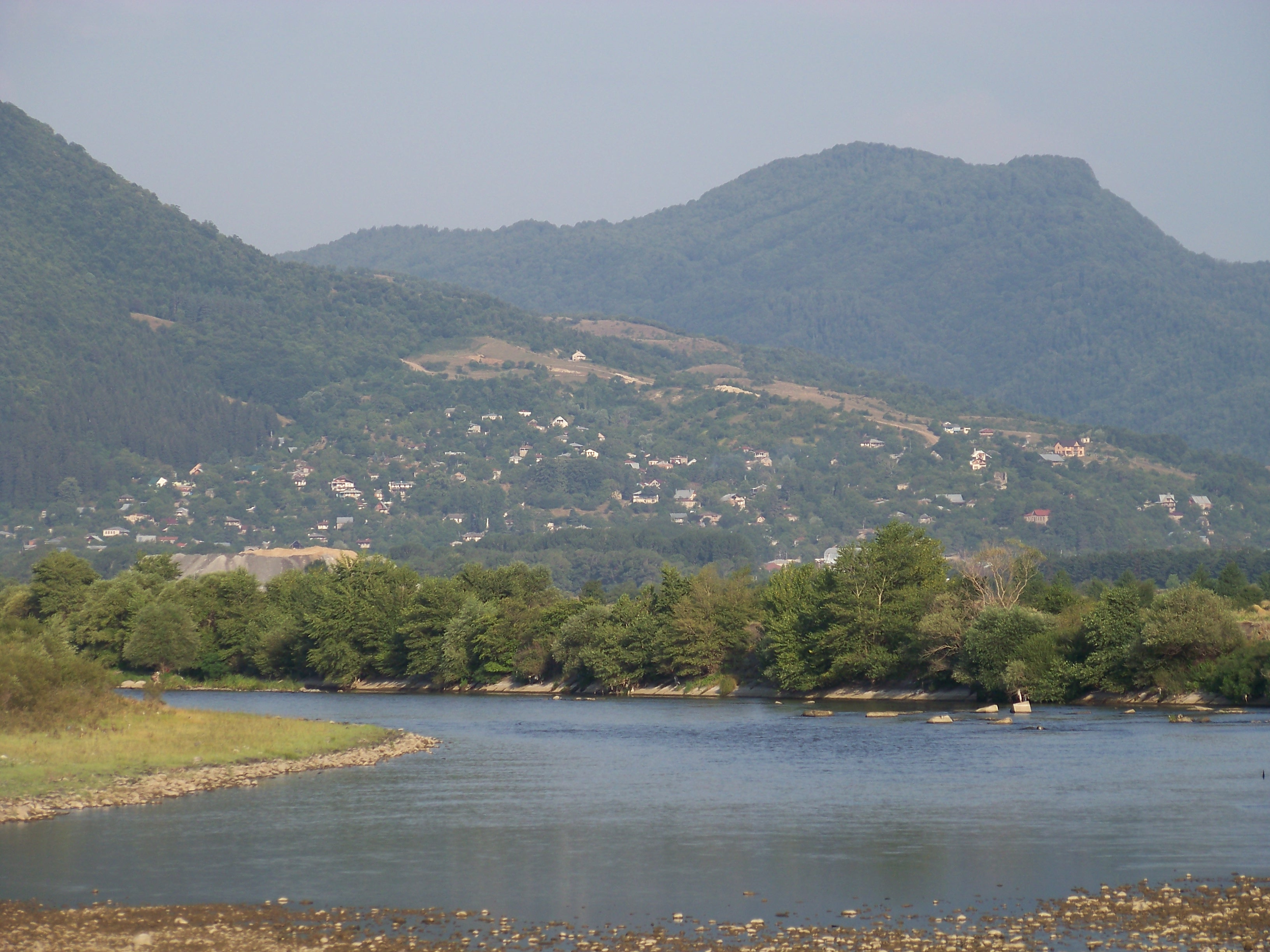

- Location in Georgia
- Coordinates: 41°58′10″N 43°30′05″E
- Country: Georgia
- Region: Shida Kartli
- Municipality: Khashuri
- Elevation: 730 m (2,400 ft)

Population (2014)
  - Total: 1,699
- Time zone: UTC+4 (Georgian Time)

The village Kvishkheti is located in the Khashuri district of the Shida Kartli region in the Republic of Georgia. It is situated between the Likhi mountain range to the west and the Trialeti Range to the east, and the Mtkvari River flows nearby.

Kvishkheti's historical significance mainly comes from the 17th and 19th centuries.

At the beginning of the 17th century Abbas I, Shah of Iran, drove the Turks out of Armenia, Kartli (Iberia) and Kakheti. The Turkish yoke was superseded by that of Iran. But in 1609 Kartli (Iberia) was invaded by the Turks and Crimean Tatars. They took prisoner Tevdoré, the priest of the village of Kvelta, and ordered him to show them the way to the residence of King Luarsab II (1605-1615). Tevdoré took the enemy astray and at the cost of his own life gave the king time to prepare for war. The enemy was routed in the battle of Kvishkheti. Giorgi Saakadze, governor of Tbilisi, distinguished himself in the battle.

During the 19th century, Kvishkheti is said to have been a haven for Georgian culture during an intense period of russification. Specifically the summer residence of nobleman Dmitri Kipiani became a place of summer rest for many prominent Georgian writers, such as, Ilia Chavchavadze and Vazha-Pshavela.

== See also ==
- Shida Kartli
