= Shock worker of Communist Labour =

Title of honour awarded in the Soviet Union

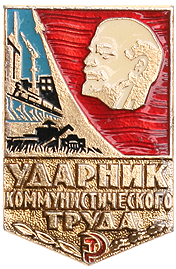

The Shock worker of Communist Labour (Russian: Ударник коммунистического труда, romanized: Udarnik kommunisticheskogo truda) was an official title of honour awarded in the Soviet Union to those who displayed exemplary performance in labour discipline (udarniks). It was awarded with a badge and certificate, as well as a cash prize.

The title of shock worker (udarnik) had existed at least since the 1930s. However, its promotion was developed in the 1950s as part of a competition in honour of the XXI Congress of the Communist Party of the Soviet Union, to encourage a communist attitude towards work and the creation of the material-technical basis for the development of communism and education towards a communist society. It was also awarded through the Young Communist League.

According to Pravda, "the main feature of the competition for the title of Shock worker of Communist Labour - as stated in the Salutation of the CPSU Union Conference by participants of the foremost competition teams and Shock worker of Communist Labour - is that it is the organically combined struggle, based on the latest science and technology, to achieve the highest productivity and education of the New Man - the master of the country, which is constantly looking ahead, daring and thoughtful. Tying together the work, learning and life, this contest has an active influence on all aspects of life and human activities, and is an important factor in erasing significant differences between mental and physical labour."

== See also ==
- Socialist emulation
- Stakhanovites
