= National Film Actors' Theatre =

Theatre in Moscow, Russia

Moscow Gorky Academic Art Theatre
- Государственный театр киноактёра
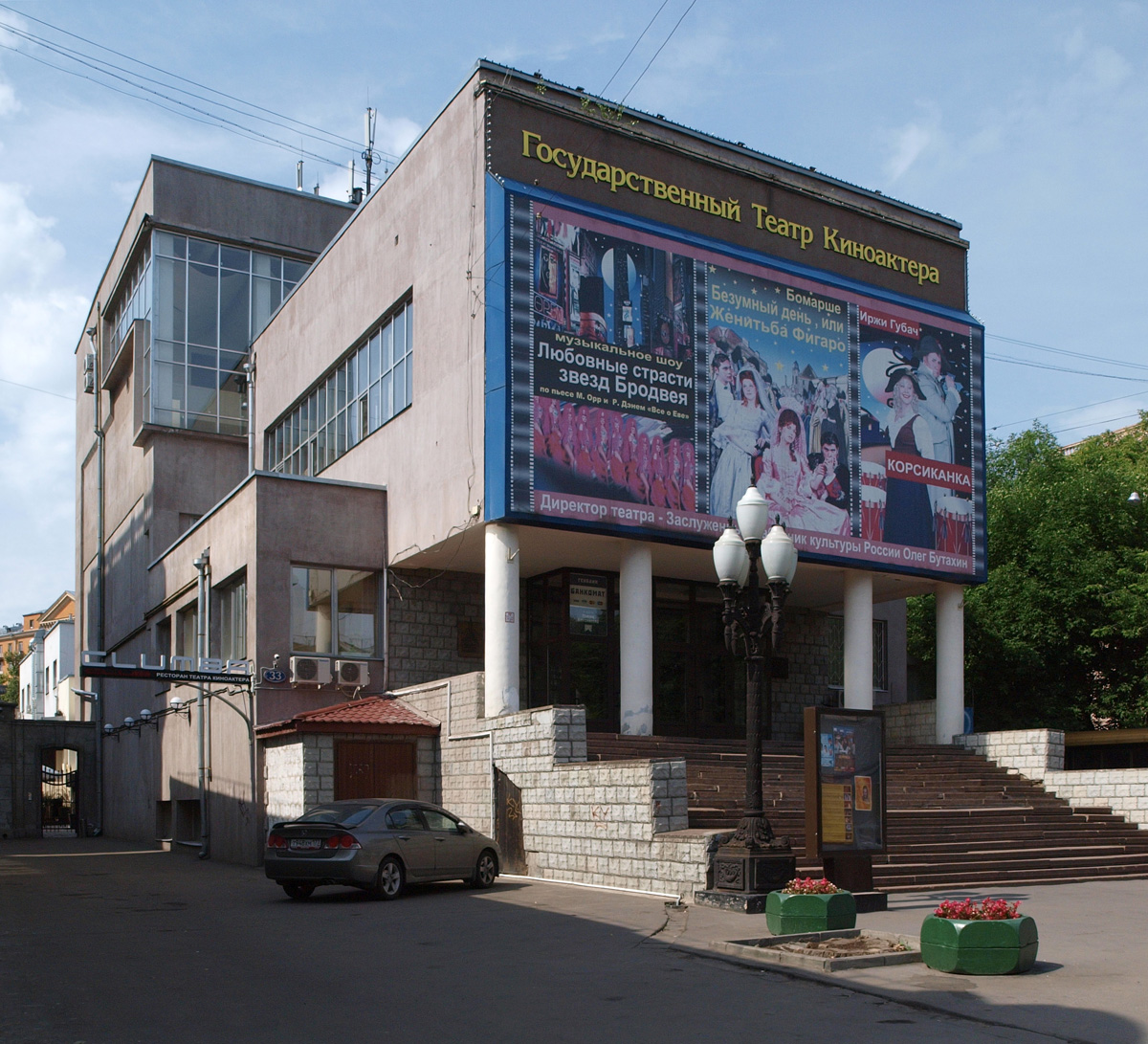
- Interactive map of Moscow Gorky Academic Art Theatre
- Address: Moscow; Russia
- Coordinates: 55.7568°N 37.5863°E

Construction
- Opened: 1943
- Architect: Vladimir Kubasov

Website
- teatrkinoaktera.ru

The National Film Actors' Theatre or State Theatre of Cinema Actors (Russian: Государственный театр киноактёра) is a theatre company in Moscow, Russia, founded in December 1943 by the Council of People's Commissars to train film directors and film actors and to provide work for film actors between shoots. It is housed in a building originally built as a house of culture for political prisoners by two of the Vesnin brothers between 1931 and 1935. It is located at 33 Povarskaïa Street in the north of the Arbat District in the Central Administrative Okrug. Since 2013 its director has been V. Baycher.
