= Poruchik Rzhevsky =

Dmitry Ivanovich Rzhevsky
- Portrayed by Yuri Yakovlev
- First appearance: A Long Time Ago
- Created by: Alexander Gladkov
- Portrayed by: Yury Yakovlev, Alexander Bargman, Pavel Derevyanko, Vladimir Zeldin, Ilya Oleynikov, and others

In-universe information
- Gender: Male
- Title: Lieutenant
- Occupation: Military officer
- Nationality: Russian

Lieutenant Dmitry Ivanovich Rzhevsky (Russian: Поручик Дмитрий Иванович Ржевский) is a fictional Russian hussar officer who originated in Alexander Gladkov's 1940 play A Long Time Ago. He became widely known in the Soviet Union after being portrayed by Yury Yakovlev in Eldar Ryazanov's 1962 comedy Hussar Ballad, an adaptation of Gladkov's play. Rzhevsky later became one of the best-known characters in Russian and post-Soviet popular culture and folklore, especially as the central figure in a large cycle of often risque jokes.

In literary and screen adaptations, Rzhevsky is depicted as a hussar officer of the Napoleonic Wars era. In later folklore, however, the character developed into a broader comic type: a blunt, vulgar, aggressively self-confident military aristocrat associated with sexual innuendo, drinking, and coarse humor.

== Characterization ==
According to Gladkov, the character was largely inspired by Denis Davydov's 1818 poem Reshitelny vecher. In Gladkov's play, Rzhevsky combines comic flaws with conventionally heroic traits. He is portrayed as boastful, fond of drink, and prone to coarse language, but also as brave, straightforward, cheerful, loyal, and skilled with weapons.

Although the character in the play and in Hussar Ballad is not portrayed as an actual womanizer, later folklore recast him as a stereotypically crude seducer. In Russian popular culture from the late Soviet and post-Soviet periods, Rzhevsky came to represent a comic image of the "brutal" hussar, an uncultured but forceful ladies' man.

Reflecting on the character's popularity, Yakovlev said that Rzhevsky had become "almost a real person", comparable in popular anecdotal culture to Chapayev.

== Military affiliation in adaptations ==
In Gladkov's play, Rzhevsky's regiment is not explicitly identified. One line refers to his notoriety in the Akhtyrsky Regiment, which has been interpreted either as evidence of his former service there or as an indirect allusion to Denis Davydov, the historical model for the partisan commander Davyd Vasilyev.

In Hussar Ballad, Rzhevsky wears the uniform of the Mariupol Hussar Regiment, not that of the Lubny, Sumy, or Pavlograd regiments, as some later sources have claimed. This identification is generally based on the colors of his uniform and accessories.

Later screen versions changed the character's regimental affiliation. In The True Story of Lieutenant Rzhevsky (2005), the retired lieutenant again appears in Mariupol colors, whereas in Rzhevsky Versus Napoleon (2012) he is shown in the red uniform of the Life Guards Hussar Regiment. Modern literary adaptations have likewise placed him in the Life Guards Hussar Regiment.

In comic sketches and television parodies, however, the historical accuracy of Rzhevsky's uniform is usually disregarded, and the character often appears in stylized or wholly fanciful costumes.

== Folklore ==
Rzhevsky became one of the most recognizable joke characters in Soviet and Russian folklore after the release of Hussar Ballad in 1962. By the 1980s, jokes about him had become widespread. He is commonly grouped with Chapayev and Stierlitz as one of the most prominent anecdotal characters derived from cinema in late Soviet popular culture.

The jokes usually place Rzhevsky alongside other hussars, Natasha Rostova, and Cornet Obolensky, a much later fictional character associated with emigre and White Army romance. Characters from Leo Tolstoy's War and Peace, especially Nikolai Rostov, Natasha Rostova, Andrei Bolkonsky, and Pierre Bezukhov, are also frequently incorporated. This blending was facilitated by the fact that Rzhevsky and Tolstoy's characters are all imagined as contemporaries of the French invasion of Russia.

In anecdotal tradition, Rzhevsky is typically portrayed as vulgar, sexually direct, and socially tone-deaf. Over time, his name itself became a byword in Russian-language usage for coarse or indecent humor.

Some commentators, however, have argued that not all jokes about Rzhevsky are necessarily obscene. Pavel Basinsky, for example, cited as characteristic a joke in which Rzhevsky mounts an imaginary horse and rides off, only to realize moments later that the horse is not actually there.

Jokes about Rzhevsky were published and performed by humorists including Gennady Khazanov, Zinovy Vysokovsky, and Roman Trakhtenberg.

== In other media ==
Rzhevsky has appeared in several later film and television productions, most notably The True Story of Lieutenant Rzhevsky (2005) and Rzhevsky Versus Napoleon (2012). He was also frequently parodied in television comedy, including What Were Our Years Like! and Gorodok.

The character has also appeared in literature, computer games, painting, and monumental sculpture. Monuments to Rzhevsky have been erected in Pavlohrad, Dolgoprudny, and Adler, and a monument has also been proposed in Rzhev.

== Legacy ==
In January 2012, the election commission of Tula Oblast proposed naming a polling station in Venyov after Lieutenant Rzhevsky, citing the historical presence of the noble Rzhevsky family in the area.

== Filmography ==
- Hussar Ballad (1962), portrayed by Yuri Yakovlev
- The True Story of Lieutenant Rzhevsky (2005), portrayed by Alexander Bargman
- Rzhevsky Versus Napoleon (2012), portrayed by Pavel Derevyanko

== See also ==
- Rzhevsky family
