= Rzhevsky =

Rzhevsky (masculine), Rzhevskaya (feminine), or Rzhevskoye (neuter) may refer to:

- Poruchik Rzhevsky, a popular character of the Russian jokes, made famous by the film Hussar Ballad
- Vladimir Rzhevsky (b. 1987), Russian soccer player
- Rzhevsky District, a district of Tver Oblast, Russia
- Rzhevskoye Microdistrict, a residential area of the city of Kaliningrad, Kaliningrad Oblast, Russia
- Rzhevskoye (rural locality), a rural locality (a settlement) in Kaliningrad Oblast, Russia
- Rzhevsky family is a Russian noble family
