= A Long Time Ago (play) =

Play by Alexander Gladkov

- Original title: Давным-давно
- Original language: Russian
- Written by: Alexander Gladkov
- Genre: Play

Premiere
- Date: 1941

A Long Time Ago (Russian: Давным-давно; alternative title Pets of Glory, Russian: Питомцы славы) is a play by Alexander Gladkov, written in 1940 and first staged in 1941. It is a heroic comedy in verse.

The play has been translated into many languages and has been staged for many years in various theatres. Director Aleksey Popov received the Stalin Prize in 1943 for his stage production of the play. It was adapted for film by Eldar Ryazanov under the title Hussar Ballad (1962).

== History of creation ==
The author himself wrote about the creation of A Long Time Ago as follows:

When my brother and I were little, our mother read aloud to us over two winters The Children of Captain Grant and War and Peace. The power of a child's imagination is such that afterwards it often seemed to me that I remembered the year 1812 itself. Not the book, not the novel, but precisely the year 1812 with its people, colours and sounds. I remember it, see it and hear it as something that actually happened in my life. Therefore when in the autumn of 1940 I conceived the idea of writing a play about 1812, earlier impressions of The Children of Captain Grant and War and Peace somehow merged in my imagination, and I understood that I wanted to write a very cheerful play. <…> During the work I had my own "working epigraph". It appeared on the title page of the play, but when the play went to the distribution department and into print I removed it. This epigraph was two lines from poems by Denis Davydov: "Indulge, joyful crowd, in lively and brotherly freedom!" As it seemed to me, they expressed very precisely the spirit of A Long Time Ago, its imagery and harmony, but the war began and shifted the emphasis of the play.

At first the play was titled Pets of Glory.

There is an opinion that the prototype for Shura (Note: In Russia, Shura is one of the diminutives of Alexandra.) (Shurochka) (Note: In Russia, Shurochka is a diminutive form of Shura.) Azarova was the "cavalry maiden" Nadezhda Durova. Alexander Gladkov himself denied this.

== Plot ==
The action takes place in 1812. Young Shura, the ward of the retired major Azarov, is engaged in absentia to poruchik Dmitry Rzhevsky. He arrives at the major's estate for the seventeenth birthday of his fiancee, but is not pleased about the forthcoming first meeting with Shura, imagining her in advance as a spoiled and affected fashionista. At a masquerade held for her birthday she puts on a hussar uniform, and the lieutenant takes her for a young officer.

Taking advantage of the situation, Shura introduces herself to her fiancé as Cornet Azarov, supposedly her own cousin. Rzhevsky speaks frankly with the fellow hussar, and in this way Shura learns what her fiancé thinks about his bride and about the forthcoming wedding. She later appears before the lieutenant in women's clothing, pretending to be affected and thus confirming his worst expectations. During a ball, couriers arrive at the house with news that the war has begun. The lieutenant, like all military officers, quickly departs to return to his regiment. Shura does not intend to remain at home doing needlework and that same night runs away from home in a cornet's uniform to fight for her country. She rides boldly and shoots accurately, activities she has always preferred to playing with dolls. In the army Shura again becomes Cornet Azarov. In winter, in a partisan detachment, she encounters the lieutenant, and soon afterwards a quarrel breaks out between them which is expected to lead to an inevitable duel.

== Authorship controversy ==
In his memoirs, Eldar Ryazanov recounts that while preparing the film adaptation of A Long Time Ago (1962) he had a conversation with Yury Shevkunenko, at that time a well known playwright and director of the Second Creative Association at the Mosfilm studio. Shevkunenko had participated in the play's production in 1942 as an actor of the Red Army Theatre. According to him, it had then been noticed that Alexander Gladkov avoided all requests to make even the smallest revisions to the text of the play: "During rehearsals in our theatre, then in Sverdlovsk, everyone formed the opinion that Gladkov had not written the play".

While writing the screenplay for the film Hussar Ballad, Ryazanov asked Gladkov to add several small episodes. Gladkov promised to do so and then disappeared for several months. Long persuasion brought nothing except new promises, and Ryazanov eventually had to write the verses for the screenplay himself.

In his book Ryazanov expressed the opinion that Gladkov was not the author of the play and suggested that "Gladkov received this play in prison from a man who never left prison alive". The claim that Gladkov had been imprisoned before the war has been disputed by Sergey Shumikhin. In a 2009 interview Ryazanov reiterated his belief that the real author of the play was not Gladkov.

== Productions ==
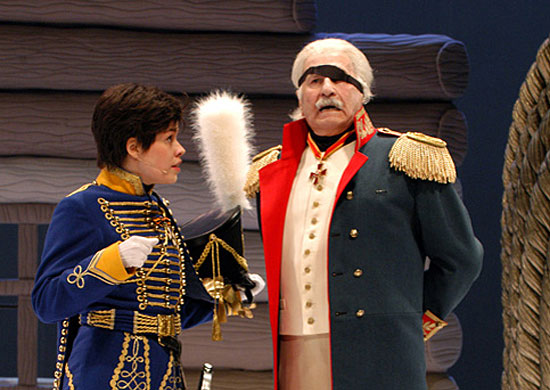
Production of A Long Time Ago by at the Central Academic Theatre of the Russian Army. 2015. Shura played by Tatyana Morozova, Kutuzov played by Vladimir Zeldin

- August 1941, radio production. Actors Maria Babanova (Shurochka Azarova), Dmitry Orlov and Sergey Martinson read the play live on air. It was broadcast through street loudspeakers between front line reports.
- 1942, Tashkent, Theatre of the Revolution (Shurochka Azarova played by Maria Babanova).
- 7 November 1941, besieged Leningrad (under the title Pets of Glory), Saint Petersburg Comedy Theatre (Shurochka Azarova played by Elena Yunger).
- 1942 evacuation period (Sverdlovsk), Red Army Theatre. Director Aleksey Popov, composer Tikhon Khrennikov. Shurochka Azarova played by Lyubov Dobrzhanskaya.
- In 1962 the film Hussar Ballad was released. Director Eldar Ryazanov. Composer Tikhon Khrennikov. Shurochka Azarova played by Larisa Golubkina.
- 1964, Theatre of the Soviet Army. Director Aleksey Popov. Composer Tikhon Khrennikov. Starring Larisa Golubkina.
- 4 April 1979, Kirov Theatre of Opera and Ballet (Leningrad). Ballet Hussar Ballad by Tikhon Khrennikov. Artistic director Oleg Vinogradov, choreographer Dmitry Bryantsev.
- 30 March 1980, Bolshoi Theatre (Moscow), ballet Hussar Ballad. Artistic director Oleg Vinogradov, choreographer Dmitry Bryantsev.
- 2005, Central Academic Theatre of the Russian Army. Director Boris Morozov. Composer Tikhon Khrennikov. Shurochka Azarova played by Tatyana Morozova.

== Literature ==
- Gladkov, Alexander (1980). Театр. Воспоминания и размышления (in Russian). Moscow: Искусство. pp. 328–367.
- Popov, Aleksey (1979). Yury Kalashnikov (ed.). Творческое наследие: In 3 vols (in Russian). Vol. 1. Moscow: VTO. pp. 252–254.
- Ryazanov, Eldar (2005). Неподведённые итоги [Unfinished Results] (in Russian). Moscow: Vagrius. p. 640. ISBN 5-7027-0509-2.
- Mikheev, Yury (2016). "Дело о «плагиате»: пьеса Александра Гладкова о кавалерист-девице" (PDF). Русская литература (in Russian) (1): 189–213. ISSN 0131-6095.
- Shumikhin, Sergey (2013). "Всего я и теперь не понимаю". Наше наследие.
