= The Riot (2021 film) =

- Official poster
- Directed by: Yevgeny Grigorev (ru)
- Written by: Yevgeny Grigorev; Nina Belenitskaya
- Produced by: Olga Erofeeva; Georgy Shabanov; Natalia Frolova
- Starring: Yura Borisov; Elizaveta Yankovskaya; Pavel Derevyanko
- Cinematography: Artyom Anisimov
- Edited by: Kirill Abramov; Konstantin Larionov
- Music by: Ivan Sintsov
- Production companies: Pervoe Kino Film Company; START Studio; Ministry of Culture
- Distributed by: Central Partnership
- Release dates: September 2021 (Kinotavr); April 14, 2022 (Russia)
- Running time: 120 minutes
- Country: Russia
- Language: Russian
- Box office: ₽17 million

The Riot (Russian: Подельники, romanized: Podelniki) is a 2021 Russian thriller drama film directed by documentary filmmaker Yevgeny Grigorev, which became his feature film debut. It stars Yura Borisov, Elizaveta Yankovskaya, and Pavel Derevyanko.

The film premiered in September 2021 at the 32nd Kinotavr Open Russian Film Festival. The film was released in wide release on April 14, 2022, later it will be available online on the Start platform.

== Plot ==
Biathlete and master of sports Pyotr, together with his wife Nastya, return to their native village to work as a physical education teacher. They are met by harsh nature and harsh people living according to the laws of the taiga. According to these laws, killing for insult is the right of the strong, and there is no one here stronger than the shaman Vitya Lyudoyed, a former convict. Pyotr becomes a witness to his bloody crime. Only 10-year-old Ilya, the son of the victim, decides to challenge the killer. Pyotr cannot leave the student alone with a terrible revenge: Ilya must train hard, and then Peter will help him get even with Lyudoyed. Each in search of their own justice, accomplices go to the goal, breaking the rules by which they lived here for centuries.

== Cast ==
- Yura Borisov as Pyotr (Petr)
- Elizaveta Yankovskaya as Nastya (Nastia)
- Pavel Derevyanko as Vitya (Vitia)
- Konstantin Balakirev as Sasha
- Marina Manych as Katya (Katia)
- Yakov Shamshin as Oleg, a policeman
- Yaroslav Mogilnikov as Ilya (Ilia)

== Production ==
The script of the film is based on real events. The author has been preparing for the launch of the picture since 2011. In 2020, Yevgeny Grigorev participated with a project in the Berlinale Talents laboratory, and the project was also included in the official selection of the MIA film market in Italy. The artistic director of the film at the pitching of the debutants at the Ministry of Culture was Aleksey Fedorchenko, who had previously produced Grigorev's documentary works.

The production was carried out with the financial support of the Ministry of Culture of the Russian Federation. Filming took place 350 kilometers from Perm in the selo of Kyn. The actors lived there for two months - such a condition was set by the director of the project.

=== Casting ===
The main role was played by a boy, Yaroslav Mogilnikov, a 13-year-old native of the town of Lysva, located in the Perm Territory. The seventh grader never thought about the career of an actor. In ordinary life, he plays football, KNV and listens to rap, so the invitation to audition for the film was a big surprise for him. The boy was chosen from 200 candidates.

=== Filming ===
Principal photography process started in early February 2021 in the selo of Kyn, Lysvensky District, Perm Krai. Filming also took place on the Chusovaya River, near the Pechka rock, the Giant stone and at the Holy Trinity Church. The entire team of the film faced abnormal weather conditions and worked on the set in a temperature of -35 degrees.

== Release ==
The Riot was theatrically released in the Russian Federation was in cinemas across the country from April 14, 2022, by Central Partnership.
