= A Long Time Ago =

A Long Time Ago may refer to:

- A Long Time Ago (song)
- A Long Time Ago (album)
- A Long Time Ago (play)
