= Hitler Goes Kaput! =

- Directed by: Maryus Vaysberg
- Written by: Maryus Vaysberg
- Produced by: Sergey Livnev
- Starring: Pavel Derevyanko; Anna Semenovich
- Cinematography: Irek Khartovich
- Music by: Vladimir Saiko
- Production company: Central Partnership
- Release date: September 18, 2008
- Running time: 95 minutes
- Country: Russia
- Language: Russian
- Box office: 245 469 464 ₽

Hitler Goes Kaput! (Russian: «Гитлер капут!») is a Russian 2008 spy comedy film directed by Maryus Vaysberg. The movie was followed by a prequel/spiritual sequel titled Rzhevsky Versus Napoleon.

The film includes many parody references to Seventeen Moments of Spring.

== Plot ==
The Great Patriotic War is coming to an end, and soon will be May 9, 1945. Soviet intelligence officer Alexander Isaevich ("Shura") Osechkin works as an SS officer in Berlin under the name of Standartenführer Olaf Schurenberg. He is engaged in office work and hangs out in nightclubs.

Soon radio operator Zina is sent from the Center. Shura and Zina fall in love with each other.

Müller sends Iron Hans to deal with Schurenberg, but Shura manages to kill Hans. Bormann blackmails Shurenberg under the threat that he will tell everyone that he is a spy if Schurenberg does not agree to intimate relations with him.

Shurenberg, realizing that he is on the verge of failure, is going to leave on a special channel to his homeland. At this point, the Gestapo seizes and tortures Zina. Shurenberg deceitfully signs the document for her transfer from Bormann and takes her away. They together attack Adolf Hitler and Eva Braun, tie them up and take away their clothes. After changing clothes, they try to leave the Gestapo, but they are discovered. They run away and drive by car to the border. On the Soviet border, they understand that their homeland is not very happy to see them either, and now they are fleeing both from the Germans and from the Russians. Kuzmich (Shura's friend) opens a door in a wall through which they leave. In the final scene, Shura and Zina flee into the distance.

== Cast ==
- Pavel Derevyanko — Standartenfuhrer SS Olaf Shurenberg / scout Alexander Isaevich Osechkin
- Anna Semenovich — radio operator Zina
- Mikhail Krylov — Adolf Hitler
- Evelina Bledans — Untersturmführer Frau Oddo
- Yuri Stoyanov — Reichsleiter Martin Bormann
- Yuri Galtsev — Gruppenführer Heinrich Müller
- Anfisa Chekhova — sex cipherer
- Alexey Buldakov — Kuzmich
- Alexey Ogurtsov — Iron Hans
- Maxim Maksimenko — Reichsführer SS Heinrich Himmler
- Yuri Mikhaylik — Franklin Roosevelt
- Timati — DJ 50 Bundes-Shilling / super-agent Timati
- Mikhail Galustyan — lucky partisan Rabinovich
- Ksenia Sobchak — Eva Braun
- Igor Gasparyan — engineer Garik
- Ilya Oleynikov — underground worker / Joseph Stalin
- Vladimir Shcherbakov — Lavrentiy Beria
- Zoya Buryak — pimp
- Alexander Pershin — Red Army commander
- Alexander Bezrukov — Obersturmbannführer Kurt Eismann
- Nikolay Danilyuk — Brigadeführer Walter Schellenberg

== Production ==
The film was shot in Lviv.

== Release ==
=== Controversy ===
Organization "Communists of St. Petersburg and Lenoblast" attempted to get the film banned, and also that the creators of the picture would be prohibited from working in cinema.

=== Reception ===
The picture received mostly negative reviews.
