= Olga Naumenko =

Soviet and Russian actress

- Ольга Науменко
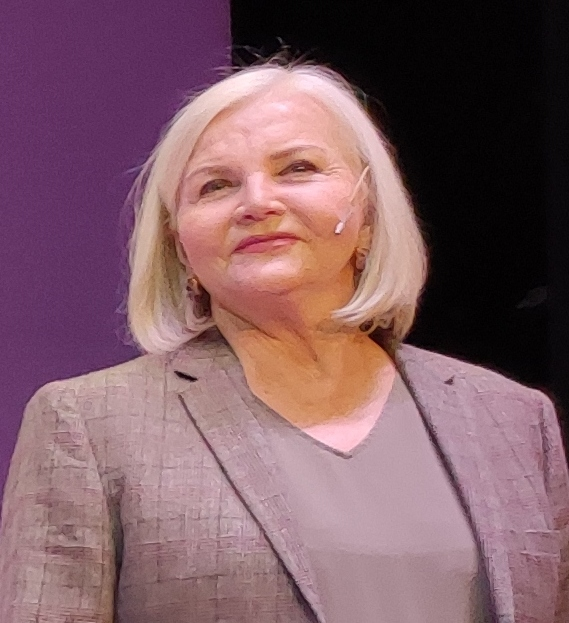
- Naumenko in 2021
- Born: 6 December 1949 (age 76); Moscow, USSR (now Russia)
- Citizenship: Russian SFSR, USSR (1949–1991), Russian Federation (1991–present)
- Education: Boris Shchukin Theatre Institute
- Occupation: Actress
- Years active: 1968–present
- Notable work: The Irony of Fate (1975)
- Spouse: Aleksandr Skvortsov (died)
- Children: 1

Olga Nikolayevna Naumenko (Russian: О́льга Никола́евна Нау́менко; born 6 December 1949) is a Soviet and Russian actress of theater and cinema, and a TV presenter, People's Artist of Russia (2005). Actress of Gogol Center.

A native of Moscow, Olga Naumenko, was born and grew up in a large family of a lieutenant-colonel and a housewife. The first years of her life were spent in Germany.

She was the spouse of actor Aleksandr Skvortsov (1950-2009), actor of the Hermitage Theater. Their marriage lasted 32 years. Daughter Svetlana is a journalist.

== Career ==
=== Selected filmography ===
- Crossing the Threshold (1970) as Albina Savitskaya
- Shadows Disappear at Noon (1971) as Varka Morozova
- Eternal Call (1973) as Manya's girlfriend
- The Irony of Fate (1975) as Galya
- Medicine Against Fear (1978) as Olga Ilinichna Panafidina
- Vladivostok, 1918 (1982) as Loginova
- Passengers (2020) as Liza

=== Theater ===
- Ugly Elsa (1983, directed by Boris Golubovsky)
- Tired with Нappiness (2005, Vyacheslav Sorokin)
- The Idiots (2013, Kirill Serebrennikov)
- Ordinary Story (2015, Kirill Serebrennikov)
- Person (2016, Lera Surkova)
