= Ilya Oleynikov =

Russian composer

- Илья Олейников
- Born: Ilya Lvovich Klyaver; 10 July 1947; Chișinău, Moldavian SSR, Soviet Union
- Died: 11 November 2012 (aged 65); St. Petersburg, Russia
- Spouse: Irina Klyaver (Oleynikova)
- Children: son Denis (born 1975)
- Writing career
- Language: Russian
- Years active: 1968—2012

Ilya Lvovich Oleynikov (Russian: Илья Львович Олейников; born Ilya Lvovich Klyaver (Клявер); 10 July 1947 – 11 November 2012) was a Russian comic actor and television personality, TEFI winner (1996, 2001), People's Artist of Russia (2001).

== Biography ==
Ilya Klyaver was born on 10 July 1947 in Chișinău, in a Jewish family of Lev (Leib) Naftulovich Klyaver and Clara (Chaya) Borisovna Klyaver (Preseli).

In 1965 he began to study and in 1969 graduated from GUTSEI - Moscow State Circus and Variety Arts Institute. From 1969 to 1971 Oleynikov served in the Soviet Army. He worked as an artist in Moskontsert and from 1974 to 1990 as a stand-up comedian in Lenkontsert.

He took the stage name Oleynikov (name of his wife Irina Oleinikova), when he started working in a duet called "Kazakov and Oleynikov" with artist Roman Kazakov, who was not only his stage partner, but also his best friend. The duo also worked with Vladimir Vinokur (in particular, in the pop-parody program "Is there extra ticket").

In 1977, together with his partner on stage Roman Kazakov becomes the winner of All-Union competition of performers.

From 1968, he starred in several movies.

From 1993 to 2012 he starred in TV sketch comedy series "Gorodok" ("The Little Town") in pair with Yuri Stoyanov.

He died from heart failure and complications of lung cancer on 11 November 2012.

== Honors ==
- Order of Honour (2012)
- People's Artist of Russia (2001)
- TEFI Award for the Best Leading entertainment program (1996, 2001).

== Filmography ==
- Trembita (1968)
- Primorsky Boulevard (1988)
- Gu-ga (1989)
- Anecdotes (1990)
- Mannequin in love (1991)
- The Thirst of Passion (1991)
- Carnival Night 2 (1996)
- The Thin Stuff (1999)
- The Myths. The Labors of Hercules (1990)
- Alchemists (2000)
- The Alchemist (2001)
- The Farm Interteynment (2003)
- Upside Down (2004)
- The Game On-line (2004)
- The Twelve Chairs (2005)
- Thai Tour of Stepanych (2005)
- The Master and Margarita (2005)
- The Spanish Тrip of Stepanych (2006)
- The Life and Death of Lyonka Panteleyev (2006)
- Three on Top (2006)
- The Kingdom of Crooked Mirrors (2007)
- Jumble № 215 (2007)
- Hitler goes Kaput! (2008)
- Rzhevsky versus Napoleon (2011)
- Adventurers (2012)
