= Alchemists (film) =

- Directed by: Dmitry Astrakhan
- Written by: Dmitry Astrakhan; Oleg Danilov
- Produced by: Aleksandr Vasilkov; Vladimir Khrapunov
- Starring: Yuri Stoyanov; Ilya Oleynikov; Anna Legchilova; Semyon Furman; Viktor Sukhorukov; Vladimir Lelyotko; Viktor Lebedev; Dmitry Astrakhan
- Cinematography: Andrei Chertov
- Release date: 2000
- Countries: Russia; Bulgaria; Belarus
- Language: Russian

Alchemists (Алхимики) is a 2000 comedy film directed by Dmitry Astrakhan. It stars Yuri Stoyanov.

== Plot ==
A famous alchemist leaves his home. Three of his servants decide to cash in on his reputation. They pose as alchemists, open their own organization, and invite various people, promising to solve their problems for a fee. But it turns out it's not as easy as they thought...

== Cast ==
- Yuri Stoyanov as Satl
- Ilya Oleynikov as Feys
- Anna Legchilova as Dol
- Semyon Furman as Mammon
- Viktor Sukhorukov as Dregger
- Vladimir Lelyotko as Serli
- Viktor Lebedev as Lavuit
- Dmitry Astrakhan as

== Production ==
Filming took place in Moscow, Minsk, and Bulgaria.
