= Give Me a Book of Complaints =

- Directed by: Eldar Ryazanov
- Written by: Alexander Galich; Boris Laskin
- Starring: Oleg Borisov; Larisa Golubkina; Anatoly Kuznetsov; Anatoli Papanov; Nikolai Kryuchkov
- Cinematography: Vladimir Nakhabtsev; Anatoly Mukasey
- Music by: Anatoly Lepin
- Production company: Mosfilm
- Release date: 23 July 1965
- Running time: 91 minutes
- Country: Soviet Union
- Language: Russian

Give Me a Book of Complaints (Russian: Дайте жалобную книгу, romanized: Dayte zhalobnuyu knigu is a 1965 Soviet comedy film directed by Eldar Ryazanov.

== Plot ==
A group of young journalists accidentally walks into the restaurant Dandelion. The atmosphere in the restaurant is extremely unhealthy: rude waitresses, thieving barmaid, wretched interior, ridiculous restaurant singer and deputy director Kutaytsev, who is constantly drunk and encourages this mess. However, the young and energetic director of the restaurant Tatiana Shumova is trying, unsuccessfully, to deal with shortcomings of the restaurant that she was entrusted with.

Journalist Yuri Nikitin writes a critical article about the restaurant, but hopelessly falls in love with Tatiana. Despite the opposition of bureaucrats, the young director Shumova manages to change the situation, making the restaurant an exemplary catering establishment, as well as finding love along the way.

== Cast ==
- Oleg Borisov as Yuri Nikitin, journalist of the newspaper Youth
- Larisa Golubkina as Tatiana Shumova, director of the restaurant Dandelion
- Anatoly Kuznetsov as Ivan Kondakov, head of the regional department of trade, Tatiana's bridegroom
- Anatoli Papanov as Vasily Kutaytsev, deputy director of the restaurant
- Nikolai Kryuchkov as Nikolay Ivanovich, head of department of trade
- Nikolay Parfyonov as Ivan Postnikov, deputy of head of department of trade
- Nina Agapova as barmaid Zinaida
- Tatyana Gavrilova as waitress Claudia Raspopova
- Natalia Surovegina as young waitress Raya
- Zoya Isaeva as waitress Vera
- Rina Zelyonaya as elderly singer at the restaurant
- Larisa Mondrus as new and young singer at the restaurant
- Georgi Tusuzov as Pavel Kuzmich, doorman of the restaurant
- Jemal Sikharulidze as Tengiz, journalist, Yuri Nikitin's friend
- Michaela Drozdovskaya as Masha, Tengiz's wife
- Yuri Belov as German, journalist, Yuri Nikitin's friend
- Vladimir Balon as journalist, Yuri Nikitin's friend
- Felix Jaworski as bespectacled journalist
- Eldar Ryazanov as chief editor of the newspaper Youth
- Zoya Fyodorova as Yekaterina Ivanovna, janitor of Tatiana's house
- Mikhail Pugovkin as Tatiana's neighbour
- Vladimir Shiryaev as Sasha, student
- Lyudmila Gnilova as Tamara, student
- Vera Popova as old lady
- Leonid Chubarov as policeman
- Alexander Lenkov as leader of the youth ensemble
- Yuri Nikulin as salesman in a clothing store, drunken rowdy to the restaurant
- Georgy Vitsin as chief of the branch in a clothing store, drunken rowdy to the restaurant
- Yevgeny Morgunov as director of clothing store, drunken rowdy to the restaurant

== Facts ==
The film sounds the Russian version of the Mexican folk song Cielito Lindo.
