= Denis Eduardovich Samokhin =

Russian former competitive ice dancer (born 1977)

Denis Samokhin
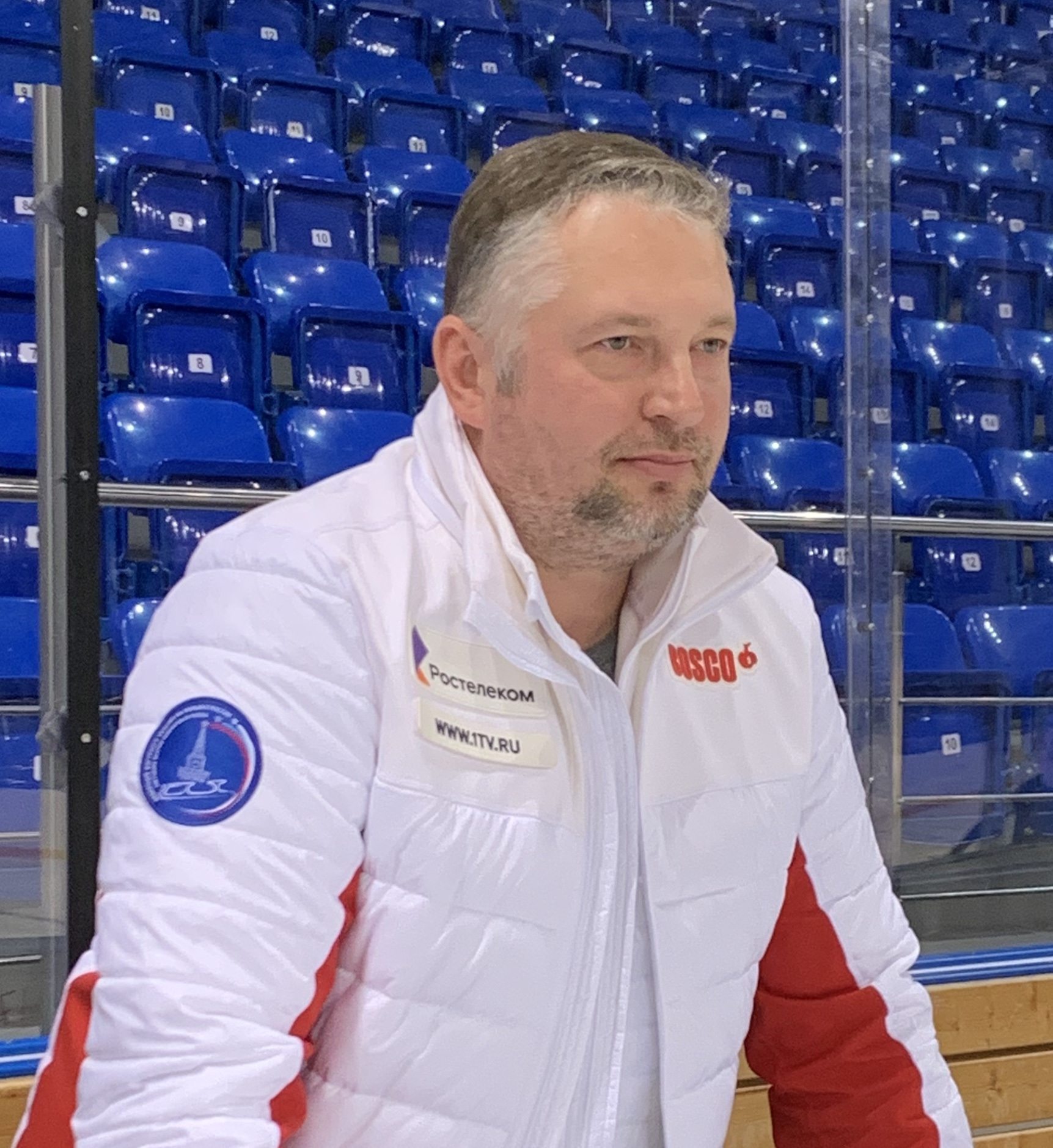

Personal information
- Full name: Denis Eduardovich Samokhin
- Born: 1 May 1977 (age 49) Moscow, Russian SFSR, Soviet Union

Figure skating career
- Country: Russia (1992–94); Germany (2000); Russia (2001)
- Partner: Anna Semenovich (RUS); Barbara Hantusch (GER)

Denis Eduardovich Samokhin (Russian: Денис Эдуардович Самохин; born May 1, 1977, Moscow) is a Russian former competitive ice dancer, a highest-category coach, and an international-level judge. He holds the title of Master of Sport of Russia, International Class.

== Biography ==
Denis Eduardovich Samokhin was born on May 1, 1977, in Moscow to a family of figure skating coaches: Eduard Evgenyevich Samokhin and Natalia Petrovna Dubinskaya.

After graduating from high school, he enrolled at the Russian State University of Physical Education, completing his studies in 1998.

From 2002 to 2005, he performed with his wife in the ice show "Imperial Ice Stars", touring countries such as the United Kingdom, Australia, New Zealand, South Africa, Hong Kong, Singapore, Germany, and the Netherlands. Between 2006 and 2007, he worked in shows aboard Royal Caribbean International cruise ships.

Since 2007, he has been coaching figure skating in Moscow. Since 2008, he has worked alongside his wife, Maria Valeryevna Borovikova.

== Sports career ==
Denis Samokhin began figure skating in childhood, with his father serving as his first coach.

In December 1992, he competed at the World Junior Figure Skating Championships in Seoul, South Korea, placing 8th in ice dance with his partner Anna Semenovich.

A year later, at the 1994 World Junior Championships in Colorado Springs, USA, the duo improved to 7th place in ice dance.

At the 2001 Russian Figure Skating Championships, Samokhin and Semenovich finished 4th in ice dance.

He also earned the bronze medal at the 2000 German Figure Skating Championships in ice dance, skating with Barbara Hantusch.

National Team Participation:

- Russian ice dance team (1990–1994, 2000–2001).
- German ice dance team (1999–2000).

== Coaching career ==
Since 2007, Denis Samokhin has worked as an ice dance coach.

In 2012–2013, he collaborated with the coach Nikolai Morozov, coaching the dance pair Pushkash / Guerreiro and assisting with Elena Ilinykh / Nikita Katsalapov — who later became Olympic champions (team event) and bronze medalists (ice dance) at the 2014 Winter Olympics.

Since 2013, he has been a coach for the Russian National Figure Skating Team.

Samokhin has served as an ISU judge since 2015, officiating at numerous prestigious competitions including:

- Junior and Senior Grand Prix events (2016-2019).
- The 2018 European Championships.
- The 2019 World Championships.

During the period from 2017 to 2019: Coached Elizaveta Khudaiberdieva / Nikita Nazarov to:

- Silver at the 2019 World Junior Figure Skating Championships
- Bronze at the 2018 Grand Prix Final

Georgian National Team (2017-2022)

As coach of Georgia's ice dance team, Samokhin made history with Maria Kazakova / Georgy Reviya:

- First Georgian skaters to win a Junior Grand Prix Final (2019).
- Silver medalists at 2020 World Junior Championships.

Competed at:

- 2020 European Championships.
- 2022 World Championships.
- 2022 Winter Olympics.

2020-2023: Elizaveta Khudaiberdieva / Egor Bazin to:

- Bronze at 2022 Russian Championships.
- Russian National Champions (2023).

2023-2025: Irina Khavronina / Devid Naryzhnyy to:

- Back-to-back bronze at Russian Nationals (2024, 2025).
- Bronze at 2024 Russian Grand Prix Final.

== Family ==
Mother: Natalia Petrovna Dubinskaya (1949–2024) – Honored Coach of Russia.

Father: Eduard Evgenyevich Samokhin (b. 1944) – Honored Coach of Russia.

Wife: Maria Valeryevna Borovikova (b. 1977) – Figure Skating Coach.

Son: Matvei Samokhin (b. 2008) – Competitive Ice Dancer. He trains under his father, Denis Samokhin and competes in partnership with Elizaveta Maleina. He is the Silver Medalist, 2025 Russian Junior National Championships (Ice Dance).

Daughter: Stefania (b. 2012).
