= Larisa Mondrus =

Soviet singer

- Born: 15 November 1943 (age 82); Dzhambul, Kazakh SSR, Soviet Union
- Occupations: Singer (soprano); actress
- Years active: 1960s–1982; 2001–2004 (performances)
- Known for: Popular Soviet singer; performances in Russian, Latvian, English and German
- Spouse: Egil Schwarz

Larisa Izrailevna Mondrus (Latvian: Larisa Mondrusa, Russian: Лари́са Изра́илевна Мо́ндрус, German: Larissa Mondrus; born 15 November 1943) is a Soviet singer (soprano), who was popular in the USSR in the 1960s. In 1973 she emigrated to West Germany. She sang in Latvian, Russian, English and German.

== Biography ==
Mondrus was born in 1943 to a Jewish family which were living as World War II refugees in Dzhambul (now Taraz), Kazakh SSR. After the war the family moved to Riga in the Latvian Soviet Socialist Republic, where she graduated from Riga 22nd Secondary School and in 1962 started singing in the Riga Variety Orchestra. Soon she was noticed and moved to Moscow, where she joined the Eddie Rosner Jazz Orchestra. In 1964 she started performing and recording with the orchestra that was directed by her husband, Egil Schwarz. Her first success was the song "Ticket to Childhood" ("Билет в детство", Bilyet v dyetstvo). From 1968 to 1972 she was a soloist with the Mosconcert concert organization (a Moscow association that organized regular concerts for its artists). One of her most popular songs was Siniy Lyon ("Синий лён", 'Blue Linen'), composed by Raimonds Pauls. She was one of the first singers in the Soviet Union to do a dance while singing, something that was not approved of back then, in the 1960s.

In 1971, at the whim of Sergey Lapin, Chairman of the USSR State Committee for Radio and Television (Gosteleradio), Larisa Mondrus, along with several other singers of Jewish descent, was de facto barred from appearing on television. Even though she continued to tour with Egil Schwartz's Orchestra a lot, she and her husband finally decided to emigrate and in 1973 emigrated to the Federal Republic of Germany, where she continued her career as a singer, recording several albums for Polydor. Mondrus also performed on tours among the Latvian diaspora in the United States, Canada and Australia, as well as among Russian-speaking audiences in Israel.

In 1982, upon the birth of her son, she retired from the music industry and started her business career in shoe retail.

In 2001, she visited Russia in first time for 28 years and since then she participated in various Russian TV shows and programs such as "New Wave", "DOstoyanie REspubliki" and others. In 2003/2004, she embarked on a concert tour in Latvia with Raimonds Pauls; in autumn of 2004, she gave 15 concerts in Russia. Two CD compilations were released in Russia. Some documentary films about Mondrus were released, such as «Khvost komety» (Russian: Хвост кометы, lit. 'Tail of a comet', 2002), «Spasti sebya. Larisa Mondrus» (Russian: Спасти себя. Лариса Мондрус, lit. 'To save herself. Larisa Mondrus', 2008),

== Selected songs ==
- Dobryi vecher (Russian: Добрый вечер)
- Prosnis' i poi (Russian: Проснись и пой)
- Oblaka (Russian: Облака)
- Ne uprekai lyubov' (Russian: Не упрекай любовь)
- Vesennie kapeli (Russian: Весенние капели)
- Zaichik na stene (Russian: Зайчик на стене)

== Selected filmography ==
As a singer

- Give Me a Book of Complaints (Дайте жалобную книгу, 1965)
- Caretaker (Опекун, 1970)
