= The Irony of Fate =

1976 Soviet television film

- Promotional poster
- «Ирония судьбы, или С лёгким паром!» (Russian)
- Written by: Emil Braginsky; Eldar Ryazanov
- Directed by: Eldar Ryazanov
- Starring: Andrey Myagkov; Barbara Brylska; Yury Yakovlev; Lyubov Dobrzhanskaya
- Theme music composer: Mikael Tariverdiev
- Country of origin: Soviet Union
- Original language: Russian
- No. of episodes: 2

Production
- Producer: Evgeny Golynsky
- Running time: 184 minutes
- Production company: Mosfilm

Original release
- Network: Programme One
- Release: 1 January 1976

Related
- The Irony of Fate 2

The Irony of Fate, or Enjoy Your Bath!, (Note: Russian: «Ирония судьбы, или С лёгким паром!», romanized: „Ironija sudjby, ili S ljogkim parom!“, IPA: [ɪˈronʲɪjə sʊdʲˈbɨ | ˈilʲɪ s‿ˈlʲɵxʲkʲɪm ˈparəm]; lit. 'The Irony of Fate, or With A Light Steam!') usually shortened to The Irony of Fate, is a 1975 Soviet romantic comedy television film directed by Eldar Ryazanov and starring Andrey Myagkov, Barbara Brylska, Yury Yakovlev, and Lyubov Dobrzhanskaya. The screenplay was written by Emil Braginsky and Ryazanov, loosely based on the director's 1971 play, Once on New Year's Eve (Russian: Однажды в новогоднюю ночь).

Filmed at the Mosfilm Studios, The Irony of Fate is a screwball comedy and a love story. It was one of the most successful Soviet television productions and remains a popular New Year's Eve classic in Russia and the post-Soviet states, with millions tuning in to rewatch it every New Year's Eve.

== Plot ==
The key subplot is the drab uniformity of Brezhnev-era public architecture. This setting is explained in a humorous animated prologue (directed and animated by cartoonist Vitaly Peskov) in which architects are overruled by politicians and red tape. As a result, the identical, functional but unimaginative multistory apartment buildings found their way into every city, town, and suburb across the Soviet Union.

Following their annual tradition, a group of friends meet at a banya (a traditional public "sauna" bathhouse) in Moscow to celebrate New Year's Eve. The friends all get very drunk toasting the upcoming marriage of the central male character, Zhenya Lukashin (Andrey Myagkov) to Galya (Olga Naumenko). After the bath, one of the friends, Pavlik (Aleksandr Shirvindt), has to catch a flight to Leningrad, and the entire group is going to take him to the airport. By the time the group makes it to the airport, Zhenya and Pavlik have passed out. The remaining friends cannot remember which person from their group is supposed to travel. They mistakenly get Zhenya onto the plane instead of Pavlik.

Zhenya spends the entire flight sleeping on the shoulder of his annoyed seatmate (Eldar Ryazanov in a brief comedic cameo appearance). The seatmate helps Zhenya get off the plane in Leningrad. Zhenya wakes up in Leningrad airport, believing he is still in Moscow. He stumbles into a taxi and, still quite drunk, gives the driver his address. It turns out that in Leningrad there is an identical address that belongs to an apartment buildings of a design identical to Zhenya's building in Moscow. He takes the elevator to "his" apartment and, surprisingly, the key fits in the door (as alluded to in the introductory narration, "...building standard apartments with standard locks"). Inside, even the furniture is nearly identical to that of Zhenya's apartment, but Zhenya is too drunk to notice any minor differences.

Meanwhile, the apartment's resident, Nadya Shevelyova (Barbara Brylska), comes home and finds Zhenya asleep on her bed. To make matters worse, Nadya's fiancé, Ippolit (Yury Yakovlev), shows up without any advance notice. Ippolit becomes furious, refuses to believe Zhenya and Nadya's explanations, and storms out. Zhenya is about to leave to get back to Moscow but circumstances make him return repeatedly. Nadya wants to get rid of Zhenya as soon as possible, but there are no flights to Moscow until the next morning. Additionally, Zhenya tries repeatedly to call Moscow and explain to Galya what has happened. Eventually, he does contact Galya, but she is furious and hangs up on his call. Ippolit also calls Nadya's apartment and hears Zhenya answer. Although Zhenya is trying to be available to receive potential calls from Galya, Ippolit also refuses to accept the truth of the situation. Nadya goes to the railway station and buys a train ticket to Moscow for Zhenya but he drops it out the window and refuses to leave. It seems more and more clear that Zhenya and Nadya are the only two people who understand the night's circumstances.

Thus, Zhenya and Nadya are compelled to spend New Year's Eve together. At first, they continue to treat each other with animosity, but Ippolit amazes Zhenya and Nadya with his erratic behavior (he takes a shower while still wearing his winter coat and hat), and presents logical and close-to-the-truth arguments about what happened to his winter coat and hat), whilst at the same time providing logical and close to the truth arguments about what happened on this New Year's Eve. Ippolit, wet "with tears," leaves Nadya for good. The duo feel that everything that has happened to them was a delusion and they make the difficult decision to part. With a heavy heart, Zhenya returns to Moscow. Meanwhile, Nadya reconsiders everything and, deciding that she might have let her chance at happiness slip away, takes a plane to Moscow to find Zhenya. She has no difficulty finding him as their addresses are the same, and her key matches his lock.

== Cast ==
- Andrey Myagkov as Yevgeny Mikhaylovich Lukashin, "Zhenya" (vocals by Sergey Nikitin)
- Barbara Brylska as Nadezhda Vasilyevna Shevelyova, "Nadya" (dubbed over by Valentina Talyzina, vocals by Alla Pugacheva)
- Yury Yakovlev as Ippolit Georgievich, Nadya's fiancé
- Lyubov Dobrzhanskaya as Marina Dmitriyevna, Zhenya's mother
- Olga Naumenko as Galya, Zhenya's fiancée
- Aleksandr Shirvindt as Pavlik, Zhenya's best friend/author's text
- Georgi Burkov as Misha, Zhenya's friend
- Valentina Talyzina as Valya, Nadya's friend
- Liya Akhedzhakova as Tanya, Nadya's friend
- Aleksandr Belyavsky as Sasha, Zhenya's friend
- Gotlib Roninson as man at the airport
- Eldar Ryazanov as Zhenya's fellow passenger on board
- Lyubov Sokolova as Olga Nikolayevna, Nadya's mother

== Soundtrack ==
Ирония судьбы или С лёгким паром!

Soundtrack album by Mikael Tariverdiev
- Released: 2009
- Length: 41:03
- Label: Bomba Music
- Producer: Vera Tariverdieva

After reading the script, composer Mikael Tariverdiev was puzzled by its genre diversity. As a result, he defined it for himself as a Christmas fairy tale, and for musical accompaniment he chose eight romances – "about love, about happiness, about jealousy, about kindness, about the desire to be understood" – which at first sound like a sharp counterpoint to what is happening on the screen, but then "scissors between the sound and the picture converged."

The soundtrack for The Irony of Fate was partly released on Mikael Tariverdiev's LP in 1976 by Melodiya. A full soundtrack was released in 2009 by Bomba Music (Russia) and in 2016 by Earth (UK).

Male vocals are mostly performed by Sergey Nikitin, female vocals – by Alla Pugacheva. Initially, Anna German was preparing to perform songs for the film, but the recording did not take place – the funds for the invitation of a foreign singer were not included in the estimate.

All music is composed by Mikael Tariverdiev.

No.	Title	Lyrics	Length
1.	"Overture (Увертюра)" (instrumental)		2:43
2.	"What Is Happening to Me? (Со мною вот, что происходит)"	Y. Yevtushenko	2:28
3.	"Hope (Надежда)" (instrumental)		4:24
4.	"Expectation of the New Year (В ожидании новово года)" (instrumental)		1:14
5.	"No One's Home (Никого не будет в доме)"	B. Pasternak	2:17
6.	"Snow Over Leningrad (Снег над Ленинградом)" (instrumental)		2:45
7.	"Along My Street For Many Years (По улице моей который год)"	B. Akhmadulina	2:48
8.	"The Third Stroitelnaya Street (На Третьей улице строителей)" (instrumental)		1:15
9.	"On Tikhoretskaya (На Тихорецкую состав отправится)"	M. L'vovsky	1:29
10.	"Happy New Year (С Новым Годом!)" (instrumental)		2:46
11.	"I Like (Мне нравится, что вы больны не мной)"	M. Tsvetaeva	1:35
12.	"Aria by Moscow Guest (Ария московского гостя)"	A. Aronov	1:53
13.	"The Last Waltz (Последний вальс)" (instrumental)		1:45
14.	"I Asked the Mirror (Хочу у зеркала, где муть и сон)"	M. Tsvetaeva	1:36
15.	"I Asked the Ash Tree (Я спросил у ясеня)"	V. Kirshon	3:08
16.	"Do Not Leave Your Lover (С любимыми не расставайтесь / Баллада о прокуренном вагоне)"	A. Kochetkov	4:26
17.	"Melody (Мелодия)" (instrumental)		4:33
Total length:			41:03

== Reception ==
The two consecutive episodes of The Irony of Fate were originally broadcast by the Soviet central television channel, Programme One, on 1 January 1976, at 18:00. The film was a resounding success with audiences: author Fedor Razzakov recalled that "virtually the entire country watched the show"; the number of viewers was estimated to have been about 100 million. In response to popular demand, the feature had a first re-run on 7 February. By 1978, after several further broadcasts of the picture, the accumulated number of viewers for all of the showings including the first was estimated at 250 million. A shortened 155 minute version was released to cinemas on 16 August 1976; which sold 7 million tickets. The readers of Sovetskii Ekran, the official publication of the State Committee for Cinematography, voted The Irony of Fate as the best film of 1976, and chose Andrey Myagkov as the best actor of the year. In 1977, Ryazanov, Braginsky, cinematographer Vladimir Nakhabtsev, composer Mikael Tariverdiev and actors Barbara Brylska and Myagkov were all awarded the USSR State Prize in recognition of their participation in making the film.

George Faraday commented that while it was basically a happy ending romantic comedy, The Irony of Fate had a "socially critical undertone." It could be interpreted as an "explicit commentary... On the soulless uniformity of the Soviet urban landscape." Simultaneously, however, critics accused the director of creating an escapist film which allowed the Soviet audience to turn away from the "unattractive features" of their country's reality. In a 1977 issue of Sovetskii Ekran, Ryazanov responded that "to reassure, to encourage the viewer – it is not such a sin." He rejected the claims his pictures were meant to please state authorities, stating their optimistic nature was "spontaneous" rather than "forced."

In his book Problems in the Russian House, (Note: Russian: Неполадки в русском доме, romanized: Nepoladki v russkom dome, IPA: [nʲɪpɐˈɫatkʲɪ v‿ˈruskəm ˈdomʲe]) Sergey Kara-Murza posted a critical article in which he reproached Ryazanov for the "anti-Sovietism" nature of his heroes, as well as for the formation and cultivation of images of "internal emigrants" by him. In his opinion, the heroes of the film are "typical intelligentsia of those years with social traits close to this circle," who, however, are well over thirty but they do not have a family and children, while having energetic mothers [almost implausible for a post-war generation] who care about their comfort and material well-being. The subtle signs of the "far-fetched elitism, aristocracy" of the film's characters were picked up and assimilated by a very significant part of the intelligentsia, who eventually "enthusiastically accepted Perestroika and applauded Sakharov."

In 2019, archdeacon Vladimir Vasilik analyzed several themes of the film – orphanhood and fatherlessness of the Soviet intelligentsia of the Khrushchev-Brezhnev era, love and betrayal, drunkenness, blizzard as an image of Fate and a metaphor of infernal fun for the New Year, – and described the film as "a monument to the era of late socialism with all its greatness and tragedy," which at the same time "carries the reflection of the love fading on earth from people who have experienced God-abandonment." Longing for God is transmitted primarily "in songs and poems that serve as a chorus in ancient tragedy."

== Legacy ==
The film is widely regarded as a classic piece of Russian popular culture and is traditionally broadcast in Russia and almost all former Soviet republics every New Year's Eve (Andrew Horton and Michael Brashinsky likened its status to that held by Frank Capra's 1946 It's a Wonderful Life in the United States as a holiday staple). Due to the film's long length, it is often played in the background while the household undergoes holiday preparations, such as cooking. The soundtrack of the film was also highly appreciated and places among the most famous and recognizable music of an era in post-Soviet countries. This tradition was discontinued in Ukraine in 2015 when licence holder STB decided not to broadcast the movie after the actress Valentina Talyzina was banned from entering Ukraine for "statements contradicting the interests of our national security."

In 2006, the New Year's Eve musical film The First Fast, shown on Channel One, included a mini-sequel to The Irony of Fate. Ippolit and Nadya meet after 30 years. During the heartful conversation, it turns out that Zhenya and Nadya broke up quite quickly and Ippolit is still not married. To Nadya's question, "Why?" he answers: "I've been waiting for you. And I keep waiting." Nadya doesn't know what to answer and whispers "Don't be sad." Ippolit remains alone. Gleb Kolondo (Vatnikstan) considered: "It seemed to be better than Bekmambetov's [film] two years later."

== Sequel ==
A sequel, The Irony of Fate 2, was released in December 2007, becoming a box office hit and grossing over $55 million to a production budget of $5 million.

The film starred Konstantin Khabensky and Elizaveta Boyarskaya as the grown-up children of Lukashin and Sheveleva who have managed to get into the same situation as their parents did.

Andrey Myagkov, although he took part in the filming, eventually expressed his regret and dissatisfaction with the final result.

== Remakes ==
In 2015, an Indian remake of the film, titled I Love New Year, was released, starring actors Sunny Deol and Kangana Ranaut. The film performed poorly critically and was a box office flop.

In 2022, an American remake of the film, titled About Fate, was released. It was directed by Maryus Vaysberg and starred Emma Roberts and Thomas Mann in the lead roles.

In 2022, TNT TV channel released a parody of Sulba's Irony called "The Self-Irony of Fate" starring Timur Badtrudinov, Olga Buzova, Olga Kartunkova, Philip Kirkorov.
