= Vitaly Peskov =

Russian cartoonist, illustrator and animation director

Vitaly Viktorovich Peskov (Russian: Вита́лий Ви́кторович Песко́в, May 12, 1944 – March 12, 2002) was a Russian cartoonist who also worked as an illustrator and an animation director.

== Career ==
In 2000, Vitaly Peskov was recognized as the best Russian caricaturist of the 20th century (according to the Russian magazine “Faces” (ru: Лица)). He was a cartoonist of the democratic trend and did not serve the Soviet communist authorities. As a result, he was summoned to the KGB, did not publish personal books of his works and had no personal exhibitions.

Peskov authored a total of about 15,000 cartoons. His first cartoon was published in Smena in 1967, after which he was invited to the Literaturnaya Gazeta. In the following years, he worked for a variety of other publications. However, Peskov's cartoons never had any official support by the Soviet authorities, and unlike other well-known Soviet artists, no exhibition of his work had ever been organized during his life.

During his lifetime, Vitaly Peskov issued copyright for his works to his wife, Irina Korshikova. She later wrote in her memoirs that he did this because he was afraid that the KGB would take away his drawings.

== Death and Controversy ==
After Peskov's death in 2002, his apartment was looted.

Official structures of Russia began to pursue Vitaly Peskov's family and his drawings (including political cartoons as his widow considers) were destroyed. Also, Irina (along with her son, Viktor Korshikov (1983–2006) received numerous threats and emigrated to the United States soon after.

One month after Peskov's death, an exhibition of three hundred cartoons was organized by Leonid Tishkov in his private gallery in Moscow. The questions of how Tishkov got a hold of the stolen cartoons and where the remaining drawings and other property are was never answered. Leonid Tishkov is the younger brother of a Communist and a high-ranking official Valery Tishkov. Irina Korshikova emigrated to the United States with copies of 3,000 of Peskov's drawings. She would later hold two exhibitions of her husband's cartoons in New York (2004 and 2005), created a commemorative website (www.peskov.org) and published a biography, To Vitaly from Irina.

Meanwhile, the threats and harassment against the artist's family continued. Three hundred drawings reappeared in Moscow in various publications and at exhibitions attended by Russian artists and senior officials of the Moscow Government and the Ministry of Culture. Even though a criminal case was opened, it was stalled (allegedly due to corruption). In relation to this, Viktor Korshikov, a musical critic and writer and an author of various articles on the history of opera, committed suicide. No arrests have ever been made.

== Filmography ==
Vitaly Peskov is the author of several animated films (director & artist filmography):

- Cowboys in town (ru: «Ковбои в городе» online) (1973)
- Mayakovsky laughs (ru: «Маяковский смеется») (1975; director Sergei Yutkevich)
- It's in the Bag (ru: «Дело в шляпе», 1975)
- Stadium topsy-turvy (ru: «Стадион шиворот-навыворот») (1976)
- To You — attacker class! (ru: «Тебе — атакующий класс!») (1977)
- the satirical animated opening sequence of the romantic comedy TV movie The Irony of Fate (1975)
- Dima hits the road (ru: «Дима отправляется в путь») (1978)
- the adult musical animated short film Pif-paf, oï-oï-oï! (ru: «Пиф-паф, ой-ой-ой!»), with Garri Bardin (Пиф-паф, ой-ой-ой online)
- the drawings comic in the film The dear boy (ru: «Дорогой мальчик»)

== Selected works ==
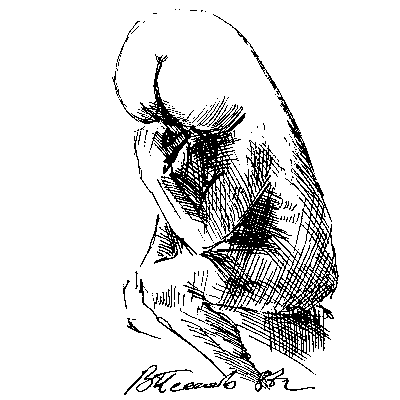

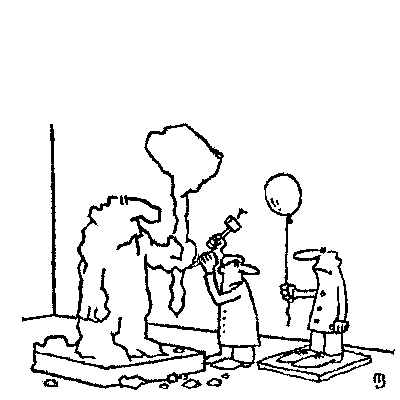

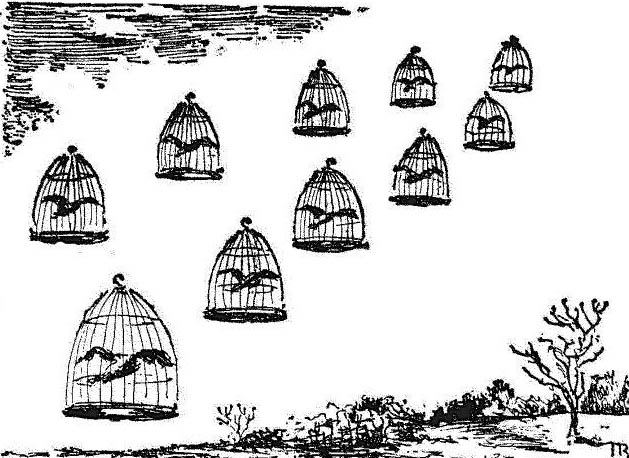

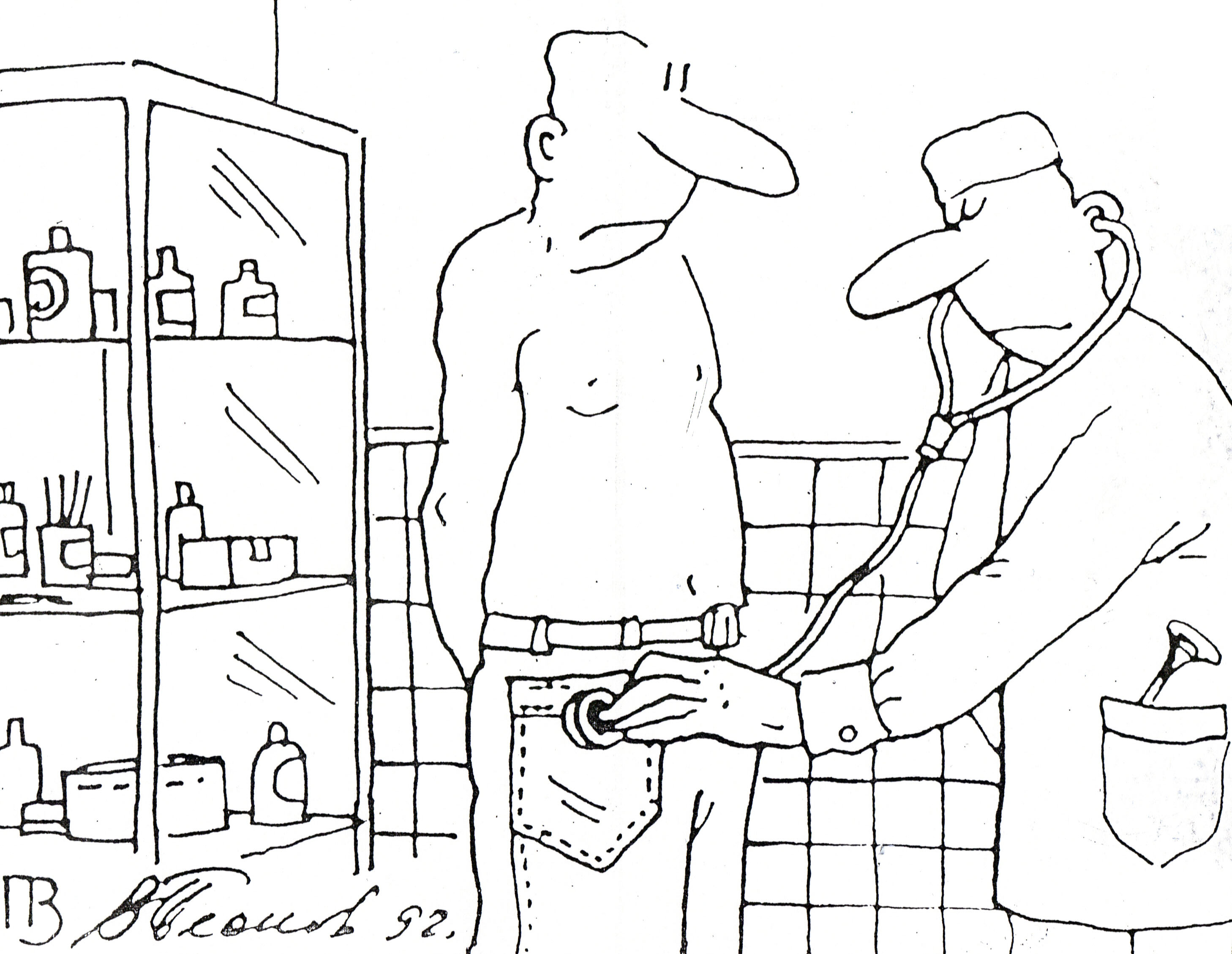

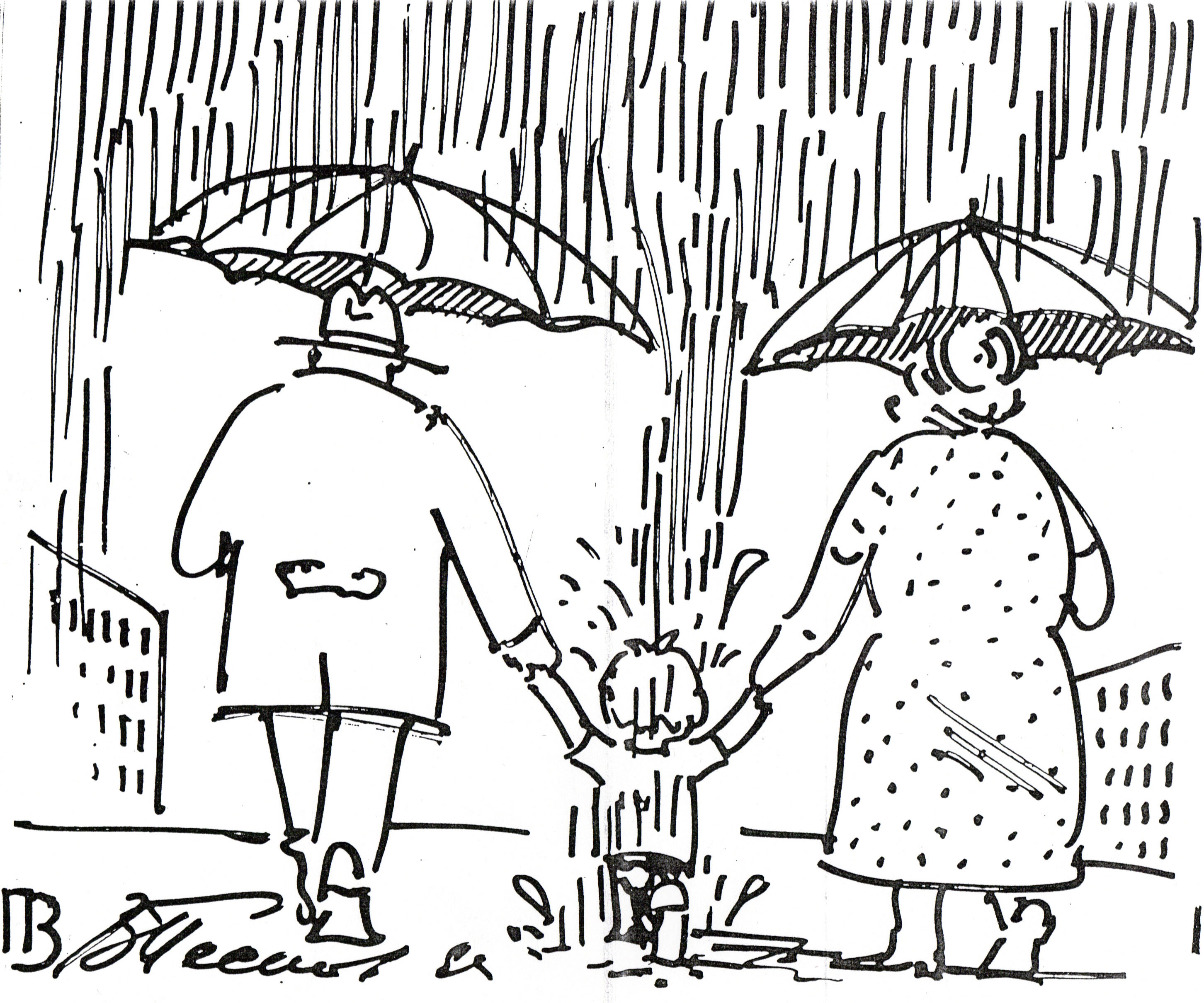

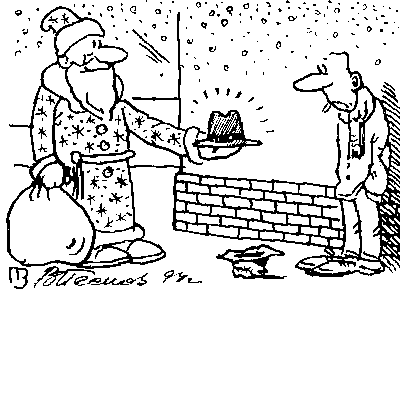

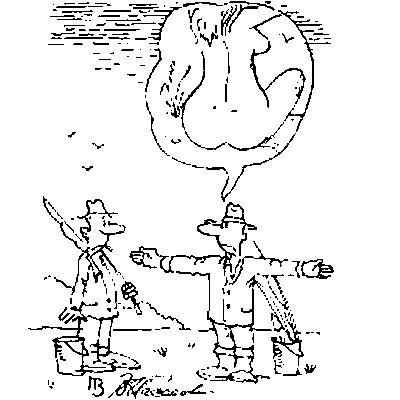

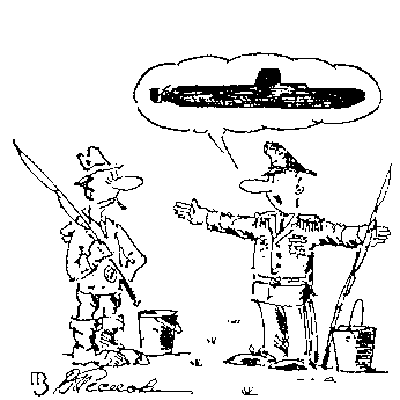

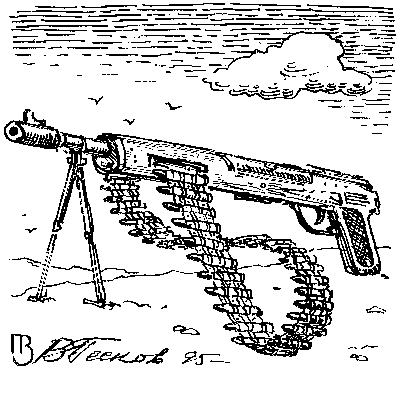

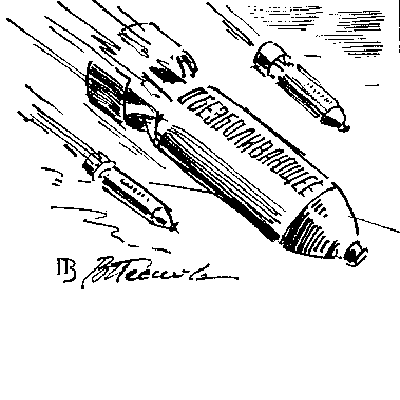
Painkiller

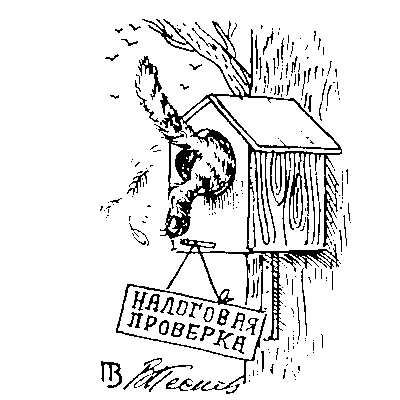
Tax audit

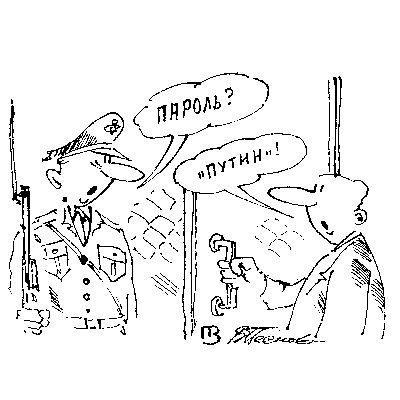
— Password?
— Putin!
