= Yuri Galtsev =

Russian actor, clown, television presenter, singer and stand-up comic

Yuri Nikolayevich Galtsev
- Юрий Николаевич Гальцев
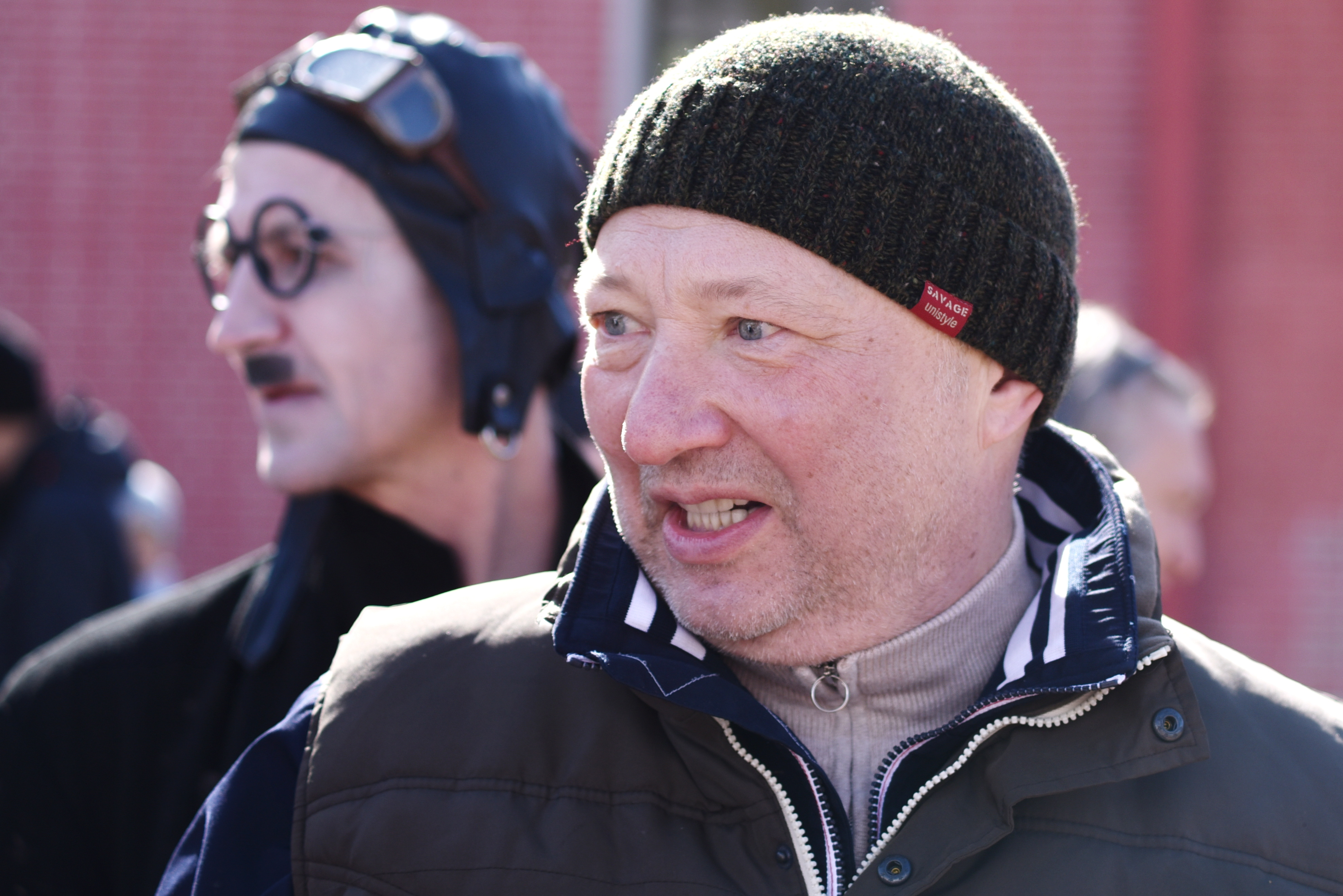
- Galtsev in 2022
- Born: 12 April 1961 (age 65); Kurgan, Russian Soviet Federative Socialist Republic, Soviet Union
- Occupations: Actor, comedian, musician, presenter, clown, drama teacher
- Years active: 1988—present
- Awards: Several others (see below)

Yuri Nikolayevich Galtsev (Russian: Юрий Николаевич Гальцев; born April 12, 1961) is a Russian actor, musician, comedian, presenter, parodist, and drama teacher. He was granted Honored Artist of Russia in 2003. He is the current art director of the Arkady Raikin Variety Theatre in Saint Petersburg.

== Biography ==
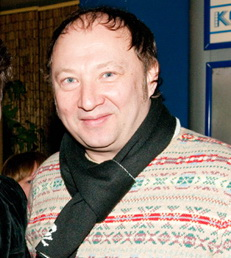
Galtsev in 2010

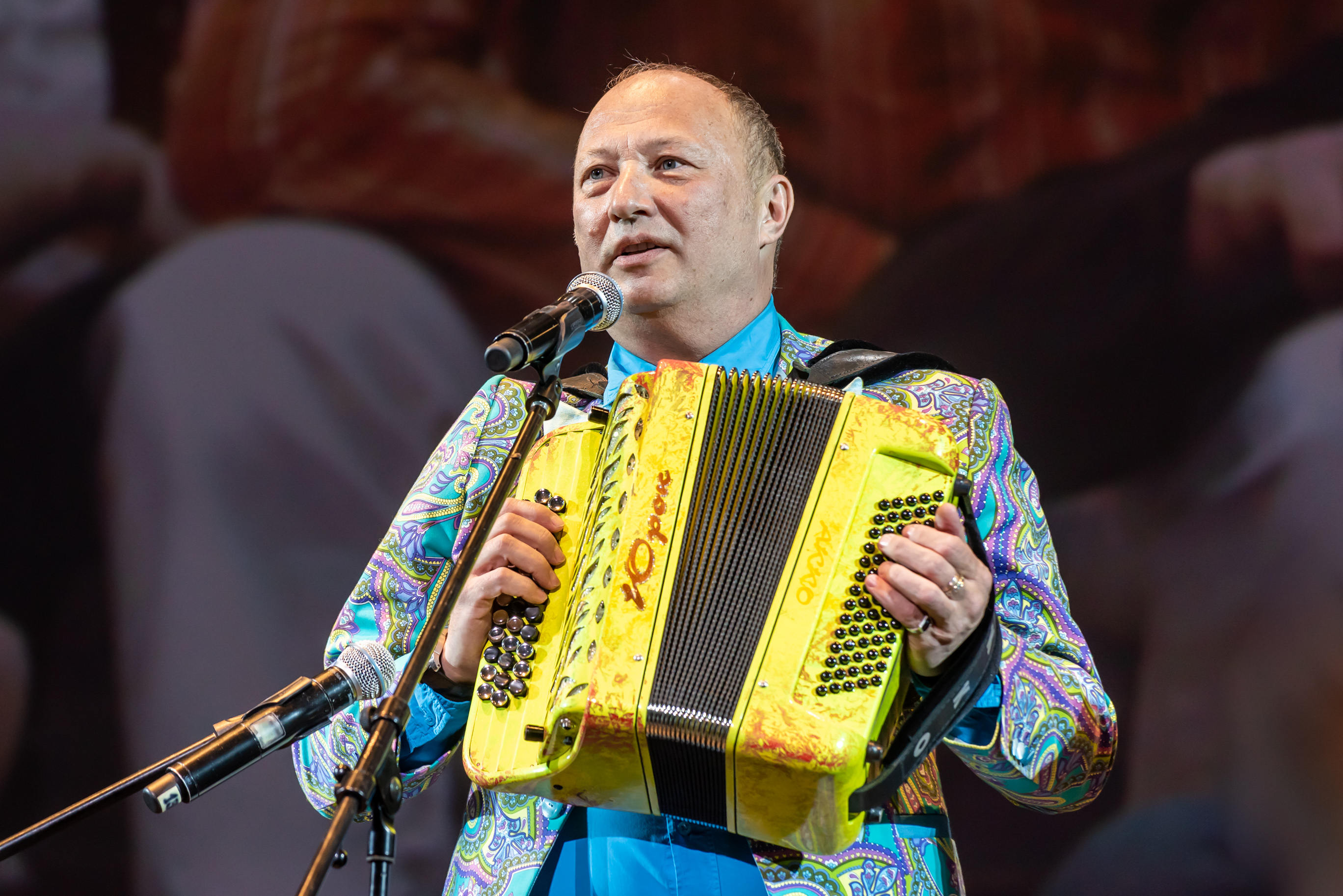
Galtsev in 2019

Yuri Galtsev was born on April 12, 1961, in Kurgan, Soviet Union. Born on the day of the first human orbital spaceflight in history, he was named after Yuri Gagarin. His father, Nikolai Afanasievich Galtsev (1935–2011), was a director of the reinforced concrete products factory and the Honored Builder of the Soviet Union.

Starting at the age of 13, Galtsev listened to Queen, The Beatles, Chicago, Nazareth, and Yes, taking on odd jobs to afford buying records. He graduated from a children's music school, where he studied the bayan.

As a child, Galtsev dreamed of becoming a cosmonaut, and after finishing school, he applied to the Higher Military Aviation School for Pilots in Tambov, but failed the medical exam. He also submitted applications to the Higher Military-Political Aviation School in Kurgan and the Higher Tank School in Chelyabinsk, but was not admitted. He served in the Soviet Army in Chebarkul, Chelyabinsk Oblast. While in the army, he showed acting talent. He currently holds the rank of reserve major.

From 1978 to 1983, he studied at the Kurgan Machine-Building Institute (now part of Kurgan State University), majoring in automotive engineering. After earning his engineering degree, he decided to pursue a creative career.

In 1988, he graduated from the Leningrad State Institute of Theatre, Music, and Cinema, with a degree in Music Speech Estrada, where he made friends with future actors Gennady Vetrov, Nikolai Fomenko, and Sergey Selin. He performed at several theatres in Saint Petersburg, including the Liteyny Theatre. Since the late 1990s, he has regularly appeared on Russian television with comedy routines, sketches, and parodies.

In December 2008, Galtsev was appointed art director of the Arkady Raikin Variety Theatre in Saint Petersburg. He also taught drama at his alma mater, now known as the Russian State Institute of Performing Arts.

== Political positions ==
In March 2014, Galtsev supported the Russian annexation of Crimea, stating, "With Crimea, Putin will go down in history". He also signed an open letter to Russia's president Vladimir Putin in support of the annexation.

In 2022, he voiced support for the Russian invasion of Ukraine, saying, "We are not fighting against Ukrainians, but against NATO". He performed for Russian military personnel in war hospitals. Ukraine's National Agency on Corruption Prevention initiated sanctions against Galtsev, claiming that he "publicly spreads narratives in line with Kremlin propaganda aimed at justifying Russia's actions".

== Selected filmography ==
- A Beautiful Stranger (1992) as the newlywed
- Schizophrenia (1997) as the trucker rapist
- Of Freaks and Men (1998) as Impresario
- Streets of Broken Lights (1998, 2000, 2012) as Valera/Sergey Serdyuk/Eduard Zaslavsky
- Deadly Force (2000) as Yuri, forensic expert
- Empire under Attack (2000) as Privatdozent Alexander Frank
- Dead Man's Bluff (2005) as Sergei (voice)
- Yeralash (2006) as the history teacher
- Kingdom of Crooked Mirrors (2007) as Prime Minister Abazh
- Hitler Goes Kaput! (2008) as Gruppenführer Heinrich Müller
- The Best Movie 2 (2009) as the herald
- Rzhevsky Versus Napoleon (2012) as the mayor
- Sheep and Wolves (2016) as Ziko (voice)
- The Shadow as Zhora
- Lev Yashin. The Goalee of My Dreams as the school principal
- Koschey: The Everlasting Story (2021) as Vodyanoy (voice)

== Honours and awards ==
- Merited Artist of the Russian Federation (May 19, 2003)
- Medal of the Order "For Merit to the Fatherland", 2nd class (March 30, 2020)
- Petropol award (2021)
