= Friends and Years =

- Russian: Друзья и годы
- Directed by: Viktor Sokolov
- Written by: Leonid Zorin
- Starring: Aleksandr Grave; Natalya Velichko; Yury Yakovlev; Zinovi Vysokovsky; Nina Veselovskaya
- Cinematography: Eduard Rozovsky
- Edited by: Zinaida Shejneman
- Release date: 1965
- Running time: 130 minute
- Country: Soviet Union
- Language: Russian

Friends and Years (Russian: Друзья и годы) is a 1965 Soviet drama film directed by Viktor Sokolov.

== Plot ==
The plot focuses on representatives of one generation, whose lives were influenced in different ways by the formation of the Soviet Union.

== Cast ==
- Aleksandr Grave as Vladimir Platov
- Natalya Velichko as Lyuda
- Yury Yakovlev as Yuri Derzhavin
- Zinovy Vysokovsky as Grisha Kostanetsky
- Nina Veselovskaya as Tanya
- Oleg Anofriev as Vadim Lyalin
- Vladimir Kenigson as Kukanov
- Natalya Antonova as Nadya
- Ivan Kudryavtsev as Pechersky (as I. Kudriavtsev)
- Pavel Boriskin as Andrey (as Pasha Boriskin)
- Vyacheslav Nevinny as Igor
