= Yury Yakovlev =

Soviet and Russian actor (1928–2013)

- Юрий Яковлев
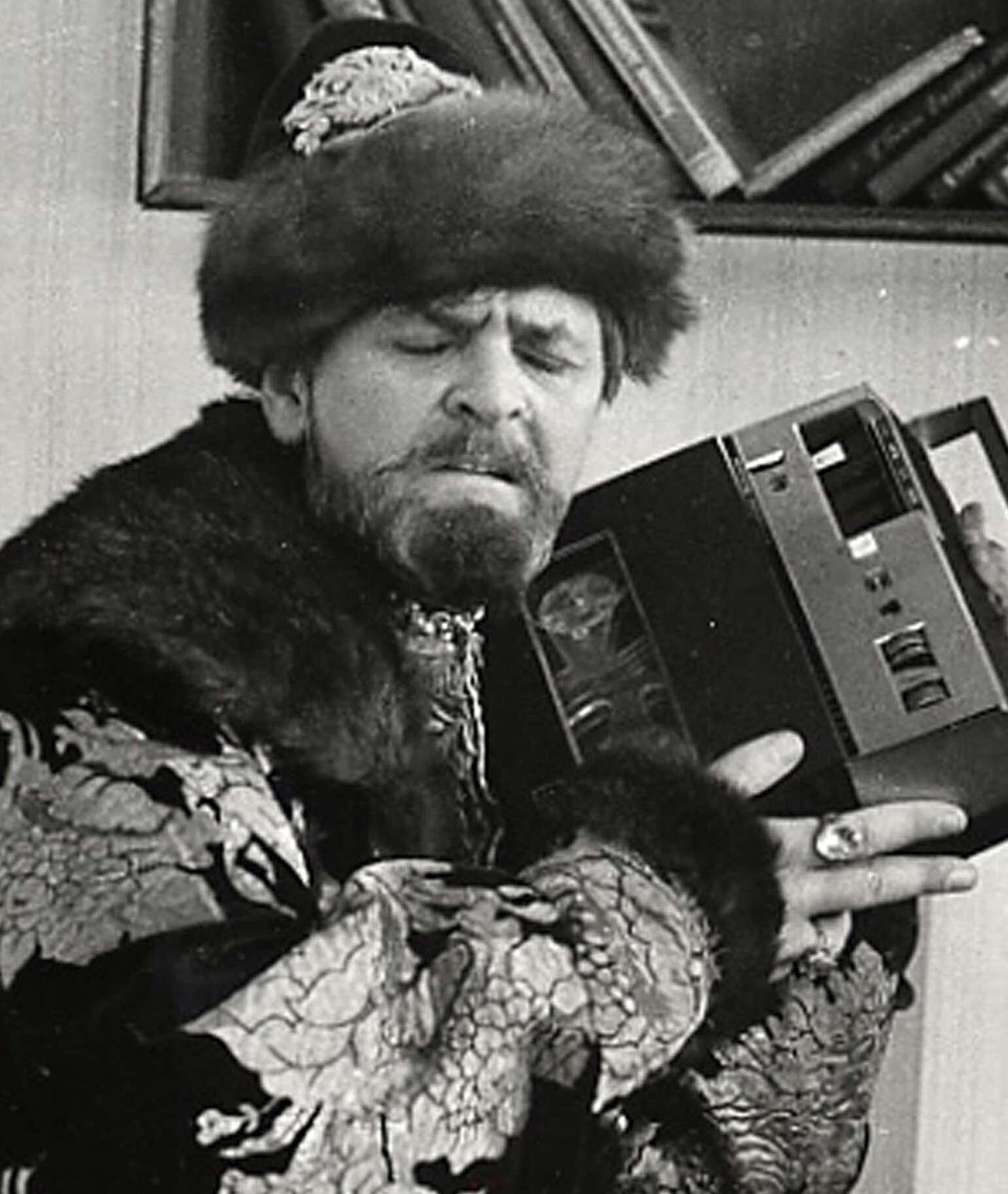
- Yakovlev as Tsar Ivan the Terrible in Ivan Vasilievich: Back to the Future (1973)
- Born: Yury Vasilyevich Yakovlev; 25 April 1928; Moscow, Soviet Union
- Died: 30 November 2013 (aged 85); Moscow, Russia
- Resting place: Novodevichy Cemetery, Moscow
- Occupation: Actor
- Years active: 1952–2013
- Title: People's Artist of the USSR (1976)
- Spouses: Kira Machulskaya; Ekaterina Raikina; Irina Sergeeva

Yury Vasilyevich Yakovlev (Russian: Юрий Васильевич Яковлев; 25 April 1928 – 30 November 2013) was a Soviet and Russian actor. He was awarded the honorary title of People's Artist of the USSR in 1976.

== Main works ==
Yury Yakovlev is best known for his roles in late Soviet film, particularly for his roles in Eldar Ryazanov's and Leonid Gaidai's comedies. Yakovlev's most popular comedic roles in Eldar Ryazanov's films are Poruchik Rzhevsky in Hussar Ballad (1962), Ippolit in The Irony of Fate (1976), and the comic roles of the Tsar Ivan the Terrible and his namesake Ivan Vasilevich Bunsha in Leonid Gaidai's comedy Ivan Vasilievich: Back to the Future (1973). He also played dramatic roles, such as inimitable complicated psychological role of the Prince Myshkin in The Idiot (1958), and other cinema roles (Dangerous turn, Earthly Love movies). He was the leading artist of the Vakhtangov State Academic Theatre during its heyday.

== Life and career ==
=== The early years ===
From a young age he was fond of acting and theatre. At the turn of the 1940s, he studied acting at Shchukin Theatrical School of Vakhtangov Theatre in Moscow starting to work as an actor at Vakhtangov Theatre.

=== Theatrical career ===
Yakovlev joined the ensemble of the Vakhtangov State Academic Theatre in 1952. He played over seventy roles onstage, including Casanova in Three Ages of Casanova, Duke Bolingbroke in Glass of Water, and Prokofiev in Lessons of Master.

=== Film career ===
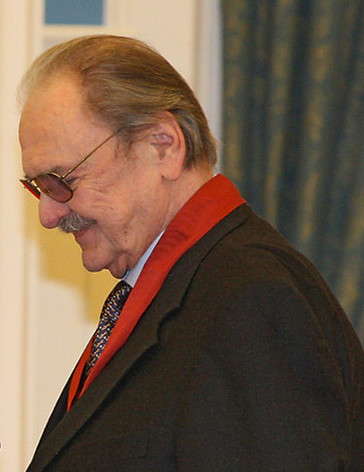
Yakovlev in 2008

Yakovlev became really famous as a cinema actor in 1958, after his inimitable, complicated psychological role of the Prince Myshkin in The Idiot directed by Ivan Pyryev. He achieved international fame playing the role as Prince Myshkin. Yakovlev made his first appearance in an Eldar Ryazanov comedy in 1961, in The Man From Nowhere. Yakovlev followed his first success with regular appearances in Ryazanov's comedies, most notably splendid film the Hussar Ballad in 1962, in which he played phantasmagoric role of Poruchik Rzhevsky. The feature was such a resounding success that Rzhevsky's character gave rise to innumerable Russian jokes.

In the 1960s and 1970s, Yakovlev branched out into further various roles, from the nobleman Stiva Oblonsky in the 1967 adaptation, the classic Soviet movie adaptation of Tolstoy's Anna Karenina, directed by Alexander Zarkhi, to jealous fiancé Ippolit in Ryazanov's The Irony of Fate. Perhaps his most famous roles were the tsar Ivan the Terrible and his namesake Ivan Vasilevich Bunsha in Leonid Gaidai's 1973 comedy Ivan Vasilievich: Back to the Future – the movie about the travel using the time machine (based on the play Ivan Vasilievich (play) by Mikhail Bulgakov).

=== Decline in popularity ===
His participation in two-part film "Love Earth" and "Destiny" – a series of movies about the World War II brought him the USSR State Prize for 1979. His film career effectively came to a halt after the role of the alien Bi in Georgiy Daneliya’s 1986 sci-fi comedy Kin-dza-dza! where he starred alongside Yevgeny Leonov and Stanislav Lyubshin. The last role in Ikno was the role in the film The Irony of Fate 2 (Ирония судьбы. Продолжение) as Ippolit Georgievich.

== Death ==
Yakovlev felt ill in early morning of 29 November 2013. He soon fainted in his home. He was rushed to the Moscow hospital where he died there on 30 November 2013 from heart failure, aged 85. On the same day, the death of Yuri Yakovlev was reported by RIA Novosti to Times.am 'with reference to the theater's press service.

Yury Vasilyevich Yakovlev, one of the most popular and critically acclaimed Soviet film actors, died today in Moscow hospital. Ria Novosti informs about this referring to the Vakhtangov's theatre press service.

— TIMES, USSR People's Artist Yury Yakovlev died in the hospital,

RIA News posted that day the information:

Юрий Васильевич скончался сегодня ночью в больнице. Прощание состоится в театре Вахтангова. Дата будет определена позже.

Yuri Vasilyevich died in the hospital tonight. His funeral will be held at the Vakhtangov Theater. The date will be announced later

— the director of the Vakhtangov Theater in RIA News, Theater and film actor Yuri Yakovlev died,

Прощание с Юрием Васильевичем Яковлевым состоится на основной сцене Вахтанговского театре во вторник в 10:00, а похоронен артист будет на Новодевичьем кладбище.

Farewell to Yuri Vasilyevich Yakovlev will take place on the main stage of the Vakhtangov Theater on Tuesday at 10:00, and the artist will be buried at the Novodevichy Cemetery.

— the director of the Vakhtangov Theater in RIA News, Theater and film actor Yuri Yakovlev died,

== Bibliography ==
In 1997, the publishing house Art (Iskusstvo) published a book by Yakovlev entitled Album of My Destiny (Russian: Альбом судьбы моей, romanized: Al'bom sud'by moyey)

== Selected filmography ==
- 1953: The Great Warrior Skanderbeg (Russian: Великий воин Албании Скандербег) as Warrior
- 1956: Early Joys (Первые радости) as Vasily Dibich, lieutenant
- 1957: No Ordinary Summer (Необыкновенное лето) as Vasily Dibich, lieutenant
- 1957: Pervye radosti as Dibich (uncredited)
- 1958: The Idiot (Идиот) as Prince Myshkin
- 1958: Wind (Ветер) as Leonid Zakrewsky, lieutenant
- 1959: Gorod na zare as Altman
- 1959: Ballad of a Soldier (Баллада о солдате) as narrator (uncredited)
- 1960: Zare navstrechu as Pyotr Sapozhkov
- 1961: Nowhere Man (Человек ниоткуда) as Vladimir Porazhaev
- 1962: Hussar Ballad (Гусарская баллада) as Lieutenant Dmitry Rzhevsky
- 1963: Bolshaya doroga as Polivanov
- 1964: Summer Is Over as Narrator (voice, uncredited)
- 1964: An Easy Life (Легкая жизнь) as Alexander P. Bochkin, underground businessman
- 1964: Russkiy les as German Officer Walter Kittel
- 1966: Beware of the Car (Берегись автомобиля) as narrator (voice)
- 1966: Friends and Years (Друзья и годы) as Yuri Derzhavin
- 1967: A Pistol Shot (Выстрел) as count
- 1967: Anna Karenina (Анна Каренина) as Stiva Oblonsky
- 1968: Crash (Крах) as Andrey Pavlovich Fyodorov
- 1969: Subject for a Short Story as Potapenko
- 1970: Korol-olen as Deramo
- 1970: Sinyaya ptitsa (voice)
- 1972: The Seagull (Чайка) as Boris Alexeyevich Trigorin, writer
- 1972: Grandads-Robbers (Старики-разбойники) as narrator (voice)
- 1973: Skhvatka as Joachim
- 1973: Ivan Vasilievich: Back to the Future (Иван Васильевич меняет профессию) as Ivan the Terrible / Ivan Vasilievich Bunsha, building superintendent
- 1973: Much Ado About Nothing (Много шума из ничего) (TV Movie) (uncredited)
- 1975: Earthly Love (Любовь земная) as Tikhon Bruchanov, Secretary of district committee of Communist Party
- 1975: The Irony of Fate (Ирония судьбы, или С лёгким паром!) (TV Mini-Series) as Ippolit Georgievich
- 1977: Destiny (Судьба) as Tikhon Bruchanov, Secretary of district committee of Communist Party
- 1978: Yuliya Vrevskaya as Nikolai Nikolaevich
- 1978: Pravo pervoy podpisi as Narrator (voice)
- 1979: Barkhatnyy sezon
- 1980: Poema o krylyakh as Igor Sikorskiy
- 1981: An Ideal Husband (Идеальный муж) as Sir Robert Chiltern
- 1982: Carnival (Карнавал) as Mikhail Solomatin, father of Nina
- 1982: Beshenye dengi as Ivan Telyatyev
- 1986: Kin-dza-dza! (Кин-дза-дза!) as Bee – the wandering Patsak singer
- 1986: Vremya synovey
- 1987: Levsha
- 1987: Izbrannik sudby as Narrator (voice)
- 1988: Shtany
- 1988: Treasure Island as Ben Gunn (voice)
- 1990: A Trap for Lonely Man as Police inspector
- 1991: Sem dney posle ubiystva
- 1992: Plashchanitsa Aleksandra Nevskogo
- 1992: Tantsuyushchiye prizraki
- 1992: Gardemarines-III (Гардемарины-III) as Stepan Fyodorovich Apraksin
- 1992: Davayte bez fokusov!... as Ot avtora
- 1993: Children of Iron Gods (Дети чугунных богов) as general
- 1993: Supermen ponevole ili eroticheskiy mutant
- 1999: East/West as Vieil Homme Kommonalka
- 2007: The Irony of Fate 2 (Ирония судьбы. Продолжение) as Ippolit Georgievich (final film role)

== Honors and awards ==
- Honorary Member of the Russian Academy of Arts
- Honored Artist of the RSFSR (1961)
- People's Artist of the RSFSR (1968)
- People's Artist of the USSR (1976)
- Order "For Merit to the Fatherland":
  - 2nd class (10 June 2008) – for outstanding contributions to the development of domestic theatrical and cinematic arts, many years of creative activity
  - 3rd class (17 October 1996) – for services to the State and outstanding contribution to the development of theatrical arts
- Order of Lenin (1988)
- Order of the Red Banner of Labour (1978)
- USSR State Prize (1979) – for his role Tikhon Ivanovich Bryukhanova in two-part film "Love Earth" and "Destiny"
- Stanislavsky State Prize of the RSFSR (1970) – for his performance as Yegor Dmitrievich Glumov in the play "The Wise Man Stumbles" by Alexander Ostrovsky
- State Prize of the Russian Federation in Literature and Art in 1994 (29 May 1995) – for the performance of the State Academic Theatre named Eugene. Vakhtangov "Guilty Without Guilt" on the play by Alexander Ostrovsky
- Russian Federation President Prize in Literature and Art in 2003 (13 February 2004) – for outstanding creative and scientific contribution to the artistic culture of Russia
- Golden Mask Awards, awarded with "Silver Mask" for best actor (Salvador Allende, "Unfinished Dialogue") (1976)
- Gold Medal for AP Dovzhenko film Destiny (1978)
- Crystal Turandot Award (1998)
- Prize of the business community, "Idol" for high service to art (1999)
- Chekhov Medal (2010)
