= Anna Semenovich =

Russian ice dancer (born 1980)

- Анна Семенович
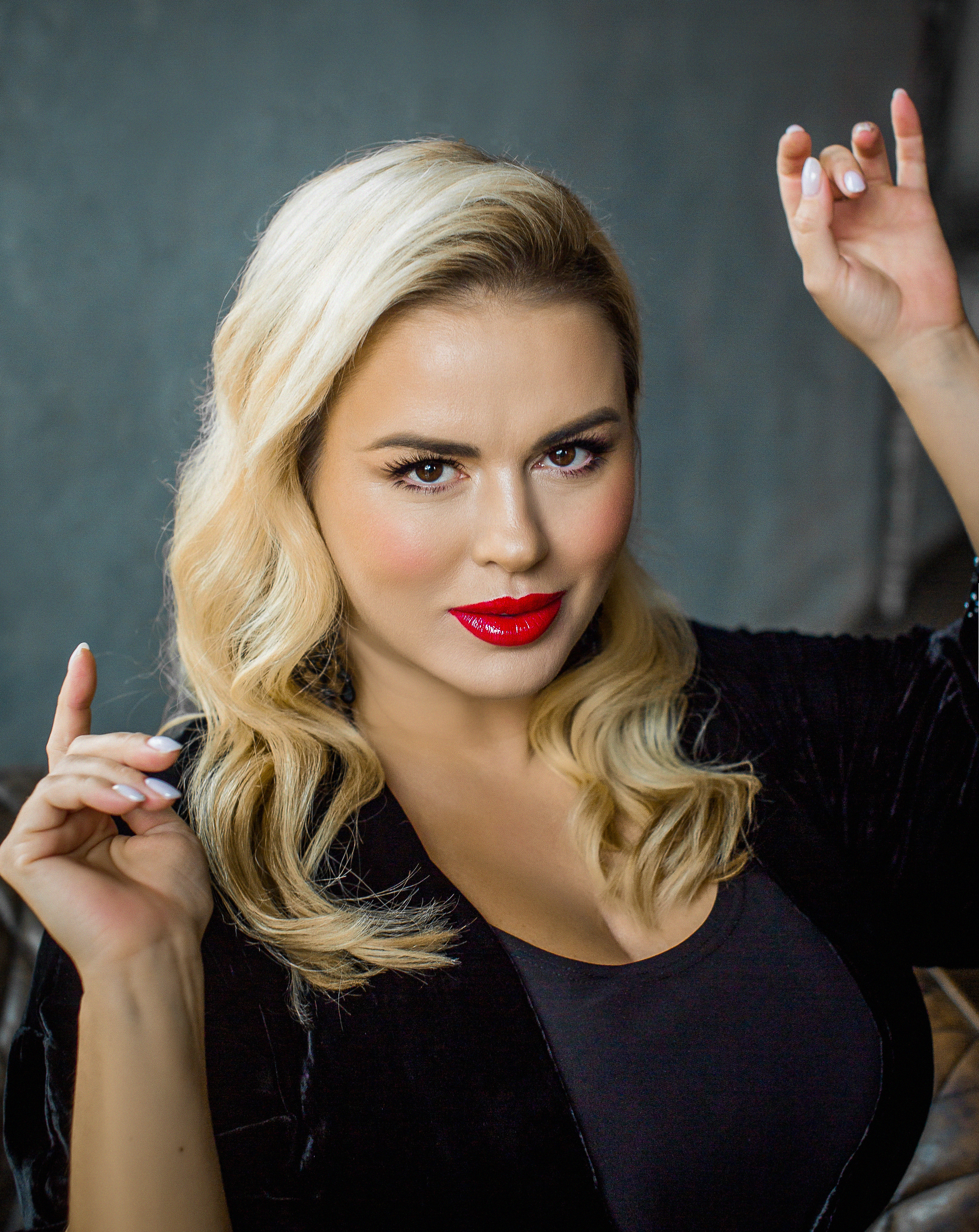
- Semenovich in 2022
- Born: Anna Grigorievna Semenovich; 1 March 1980 (age 46); Moscow, Russian SFSR, Soviet Union
- Occupations: Ice dancer; singer; actress; model
- Musical career
- Genres: Pop
- Years active: 2003–present
- Label: Velvet Music
- Formerly of: Blestyashchiye
- Figure skating career
- Height: 1.69 m (5 ft 6 1/2 in)
- Country: Russia
- Retired: 2001
- Website: annasemenovich.ru

Anna Grigorievna Semenovich (Russian: А́нна Григо́рьевна Семено́вич; born 1 March 1980) is a Russian singer, actress, model, and former competitive ice dancer.

== Skating career ==
Early in her career, Semenovich skated with Denis Samokhin. They competed at two World Junior Championships, placing 8th in 1993 and 7th in 1994. After a brief partnership with Maxim Kachanov, placing fifth at the 1994 Goodwill Games, she teamed up with Vladimir Fedorov in 1995. They won the Finlandia Trophy twice and competed on the Grand Prix of Figure Skating. The highlight of their partnership was competing at the 1998 World Championships, where they placed 15th. Their partnership ended in 1999 and Semenovich teamed up with Roman Kostomarov for one season. With Kostomarov, she is the Russian bronze medalist and competed at both the 2000 European Championships and the 2000 World Championships.

Following the end of that partnership, she reunited with Denis Samokhin and placed 4th at the 2001 Russian Championships. She eventually retired due to injury.

=== Results ===
GP: Part of Champions Series from 1995; renamed Grand Prix in 1998

==== With Samokhin ====
International
Event	1992–93	1993–94	2000–01
World Junior Champ.	8th	7th	
Autumn Trophy	5th J.		
National
Russian Champ.			4th

==== With Kostomarov ====
International
Event	1999–2000
World Championships	13th
European Championships	10th
GP Cup of Russia	4th
National
Russian Championships	2nd

==== With Fedorov ====
International
Event	1995–96	1996–97	1997–98	1998–99
World Champ.			15th	
GP Cup of Russia			4th	
GP NHK Trophy	3rd	7th		
GP Skate America			3rd	4th
GP Skate Canada		6th		
GP Trophée Lalique				4th
Finlandia Trophy		1st	1st	
Centennial On Ice	6th			
Lysiane Lauret		2nd		
Autumn Trophy		3rd		
National
Russian Champ.			3rd	4th

==== With Kachanov ====
Event	1994–1995
Goodwill Games	5th

== Entertainment career ==
Following her retirement from skating, Semenovich began working as an actress, model, and singer. She was part of the girl group Blestyashchiye from 2003 to 2007. In March 2007, she left the group to pursue a solo career. In 2008, she released her album, Слухи. There was a single, "На Моря", featuring Arash. She appeared in the first season of ice show contest Ice Age. She had a lead role in the 2008 Russian spy comedy Hitler goes Kaput!. She also played in the 2012 sequel Rzhevsky versus Napoleon.

== Views and sanctions ==
Semenovich supports the 2022 Russian invasion of Ukraine. She participated in a series of concerts in support of the invasion in April and May 2022. On 1 June 2022, Latvia banned her from entering the country. On 7 January 2023, she was added to Ukraine's sanctions list.

In June 2023, Russian musician Vladimir Kiselyov launched a cash prize for the Russian military if they destroy Leopard 1 and Leopard 2 tanks belonging to the Ukrainian military. Semenovich was one of multiple other Russian public figures to join the initiative.
