= Pavel Derevyanko =

Russian theatre and film actor

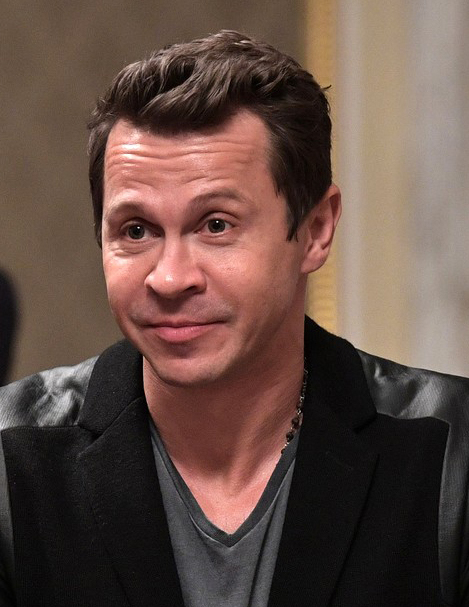
- Born: Pavel Yurievich Derevyanko; 2 July 1976 (age 50); Taganrog, Rostov Oblast, Russian SFSR, Soviet Union
- Occupation: Actor
- Years active: 2001-present
- Website: http://www.depablo.ru/

Pavel Yurievich Derevyanko (Russian: Па́вел Ю́рьевич Деревя́нко, born 2 July 1976) is a Russian actor .

== Biography ==
Pavel Derevyanko was born in the city of Taganrog, Rostov Oblast, Russian SFSR, Soviet Union. His parents, Yuri Pavlovich and Tatiana Vasilievna Derevyanko, worked all their life at a factory in Taganrog.

He studied in Kiev, Ukrainian SSR. Afterwards, Pavel moved to Moscow where he entered the Russian Academy of Theatre Arts. He studied there from 1996 until 2000. He was noticed by director Alexander Kott as a sophomore of the GITIS (course of Leonid Kheyfets) when Pavel with other students staged the performance Overstocked Packaging Barrels. When Alexander Kott began shooting his film Two Chauffeurs were Driving, he tracked down Derevyanko. At that time Pavel was rehearsing in Oleg Menshikov's theatrical project "Kitchen", but he did not wish to refuse the proposal of Alexander Kott to star in a film. The film Two Chauffeurs were Driving was warmly received by the audience, and the role of Kolka Snegirev brought the beginning actor his first fame.

The young actor appeared then in the following films – Nine Lives of Nestor Makhno (2006), Antikiller 2 and the TV series Strafbat.

Derevyanko is also well known for acting in the comedies Hitler goes Kaput! (2008) and Rzhevsky versus Napoleon (2012).

In 2013, the actor was nominated for the Golden Eagle Award for Best Actor in Television for the role of Mikhail Solovyov in the television series The Dark Side of the Moon.

In the spring of 2015, he acted in the music video of Vasil Oblomov for the song "Mnogochodovochka". In the fall of 2015, a clip of the group Uma2rman "Toxins" with Pavel was released.

He starred in a lead role (Peter III) in the TV series Catherine the Great (2015), along with Yuliya Snigir (Catherine II).

=== Personal life ===
His common-law wife was Daria Myasishcheva, and in 2010 his daughter Varvara was born. In 2014 Alexandra's second daughter was born. On the eve of 2021 Derevyanko and Myasishcheva broke up.

== Political Positions ==
Derevyanko supports the 2022 Russian invasion of Ukraine. In an interview, he declared: “I realized that I’m nothing without it, without my country. I realized that it’s a part of me. And I’m all in for this, for everything, and I want us to win.” Previously, he travelled to Russian-occupied Donbas.

== Career ==
=== Theatre roles ===
- «Затоваренная бочкотара» — Volodya Teleskopov
- Roberto Zucco (play by Bernard-Marie Koltès — Roberto Zucco
- The Overcoat — Akaky Akakievich Bashmachkin
- «Герой» — Кристофер Мехоун
- «Имаго pigmalionum» — Colonel Pikkering
- The Master and Margarita — Behemoth cat
- «Би-фем» — Mother
- Viy (story) — Khoma Brut

=== Filmography ===
- 2001 Ехали два шофёра / We drove two chauffeur as Kolya
- 2001 Ростов-Папа / Rostov-Pope (TV series)
- 2001 Смеситель / Dlender as Efrosinya
- 2002 По ту сторону волков / On the side Volkov (TV series) as Volodya
- 2002 Ледниковый период / Ice Age (TV series) as operas Zhenya Chistyakov
- 2003 Участок / The site (TV series) as paramedic Vadik
- 2003 Стилет / Stiletto (TV series) as Kolya "Bochka"
- 2003 Родина ждёт / Homeland waiting (TV series) as Morshansky Jr.
- 2003 Как бы не так / Like fun (TV)
- 2003 Француз / Frenchman as a fellow traveler on train
- 2003 Бабуся / Granny as each Viti
- 2004 Женщины в игре без правил / Women in a game without rules (TV series) as Vitka Korshunov
- 2004 Штрафбат / Shtrafbat (TV series) as Chypa
- 2005 Взять Тарантину / Vzyat Tarantinu as Gosha
- 2005 Анна / Anna as Nikolay Romanov
- 2005 The Case of "Dead Souls" (TV series) as Bashmachkin, Schiller, Chichikov
- 2005 Yesenin as Alexei Ganin
- 2005 Люби меня / Love me as Shura, Mara
- 2005 Shadowboxing (2005 film) as Timokha
- 2006 Девять жизней Нестора Махно / Nine Lives of Nestor Makhno as Nestor Makhno
- 2006 Заколдованный участок / Enchanted land – Vadik
- 2007 Неваляшка / Roly-poly toy (film) as Ivan Zhukov "Roly-poly toy"
- 2007 Shadowboxing 2: Revenge as Timokha
- 2007 Attack on Leningrad (TV series) as Terekhin
- 2007 Revenge
- 2007 Кука / Cook as Serega
- 2007 Беглянки / Fugitives as Venya
- 2007 Громовы. Дом надежды / Gromov. House of Hope as Derevo
- 2008 Братья Карамазовы / The Brothers Karamazov (TV series) as Pavel Smerdyakov
- 2008 Плюс один / Plus one (film) as bunny
- 2008 Hitler goes Kaput! as Olaf Shurenberg / Shura Osechkin
- 2009 На море! / On the sea! as Pasha
- 2009 Кошечка / Cat as a guest at a wedding
- 2010 Счастливый конец / Happy End as stripper Pasha Davydenko
- 2010 Love in the Big City 2 as guard sports body
- 2010 Любовь под прикрытием / Love undercover – Gera
- 2010 Fortress of War as Regimental Commissar Fomin
- 2010 Утомлённые солнцем 2 / Burnt by the Sun 2 as legless soldier fiancé
- 2010 Я не я / I'm not myself as singer
- 2010 Самка / The female as militiaman
- 2010 Всем скорбящим радость / All the Afflicted as Stepan
- 2012 Rzhevsky versus Napoleon as Poruchik Rzhevsky
- 2012 The Dark Side of the Moon (TV series) as Mikhail Solovev
- 2012 В гостях у Sкаzки / Away Sкаzki
- 2013 The Thaw as Gennady Budnik, actor
- 2013 Чёрные кошки / Black Cats as Egor Dragun
- 2014 Тальянка / Talianki (TV series) as Vasily Stalin
- 2014 Неваляшка-2 / Roly-poly toy 2 (film) as Ivan Zhukov "Roly-poly toy"
- 2014 Смешанные чувства / Mixed feelings as Petr
- 2015 Кровавая леди Батори / Lady of Csejte as Atilla
- 2015 Catherine the Great (TV series) as Peter III of Russia
- 2016 Friday as Gannadiy Antonov
- 2017 Salyut-7 (film) as Viktor Alyokhin, cosmonaut
- 2018 House Arrest as Arkady Anikeev, ex-mayor
- 2018 Gogol. The Beginning as Alexander Pushkin
- 2018 Gogol. Terrible Revenge as Alexander Pushkin
- 2018 Night Shift as Sergei
- 2021 The Riot as Vitya

== Awards and nomination ==
- 2014 — nomination for the Golden Eagle Award for Best Actor in a television role (TV series "The Dark Side of the Moon")
- 2020 — Golden Eagle Award for Best Actor in a television Role (TV series "House Arrest")
- 2021 — Kinotavr Award for Best Actor (the film "The Riot")
- 2022 — The White Elephant Award for Best Supporting Actor (the film "The Riot")
- 2022 — diploma for the best performance of a male role of the XXIV All-Russian Film Festival "Shukshin Days in Altai" (the film "The Riot")
