= Tatyana Shmyga =

Soviet-Russian singer and actress (1928–2011)

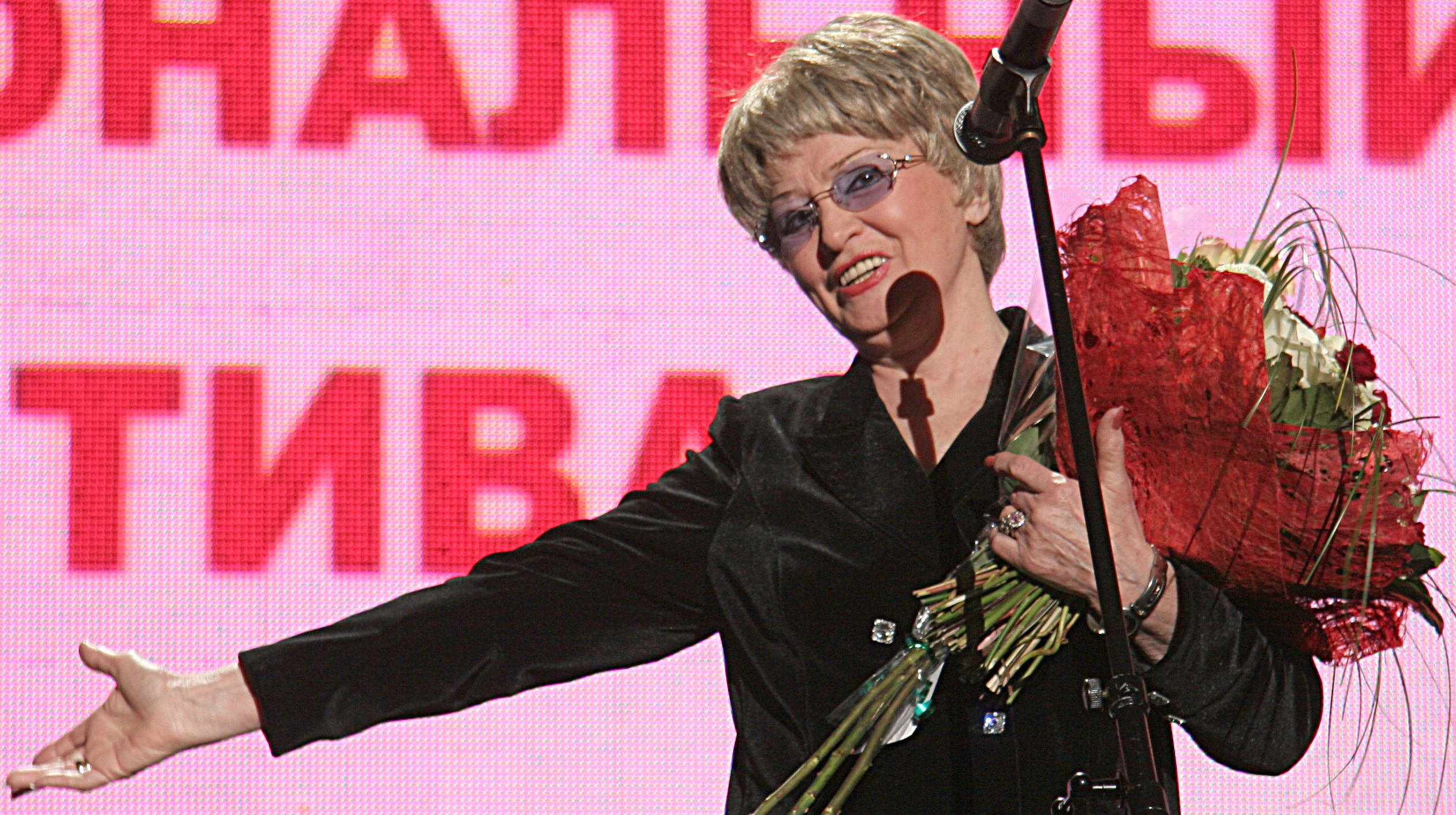
Shmyga in 2006

Tatyana Ivanovna Shmyga (Russian: Татьяна Ивановна Шмыга; 31 December 1928 – 3 February 2011) was a Soviet and Russian operetta/musical theatre performer. She went on to act in films as well. She was a People's Artist of the USSR (1978).

Moscow-born Shmyga graduated from the Lunacharsky State Institute for Theatre Arts, where she studied voice under Dora Borisovna Beliavskaia and acting under Joseph Mikhailovich Tumanov, later becoming a soloist with the Moscow Operetta Theater the same year. She began acting in films in 1962, notably appearing in Eldar Ryazanov's The Hussar Ballad.

== Awards ==
Shmyga remains the only musical theatre actress to date to receive the title of People's Artist of the USSR. She also received the Glinka State Prize of the RSFSR in 1974, the Order of the Badge of Honor and several other medals.

== Personal life ==
She was married three times:

- television journalist Rudolf Borecki
- musical director Vladimir Kandelaki
- composer Anatoly Kremer

== Death ==
Shmyga died in Moscow, aged 82, from vascular disease.
