= Lyubov Dobrzhanskaya =

Soviet singer and actress (1905–1980)

- Любовь Добржанская
- Dobrzhanskaya in 1977
- Born: December 24, 1905; Kiev, Russian Empire (present-day Ukraine)
- Died: November 3, 1980 (aged 74); Moscow, Russian SFSR, Soviet Union
- Occupations: Singer, actress
- Years active: 1924–1978

Lyubov Ivanovna Dobrzhanskaya (Note: Russian: Любовь Ивановна Добржанская, romanized: Lyubov Ivanovna Dobrzhanskaya; Ukrainian: Любов Іванівна Добржанська, romanized: Liubov Ivanivna Dobrzhanska) (24 December 1905 – 3 November 1980) was a Soviet singer and actress of theater and cinema. She won the Stalin Prize II degree in 1951 and the People's Artist of the USSR Award in 1965. She is best known for her roles in films Beware of the Car (as Detochkin's mother) and The Irony of Fate (as Zhenya's mother).

== Biography ==
Dobrzhanskaya was born to a noble family on December 24, 1905, in Kiev.

In 1923–1924 she studied at the theater studio. In 1934 she began acting in the Russian Army Theatre in Moscow where Aleksey Popov had a great influence on her art.

She participated in various concerts. Her performances of romances enjoyed great success. She was also the author of Leonid Utyosov's song Under the Spring Foliage.

She was married four times but had no children.

Lyubov Dobrzhanskaya died on November 3, 1980, in Moscow. She was buried at the Vagankovo Cemetery.
