= Kyn (selo) =

Kyn Кын
- Selo
- Location within Perm Krai Location within Russia
- Coordinates: 57°51′N 58°38′E
- Country: Russia
- Region: Perm Krai
- District: Lysva
- Time zone: UTC+5:00

Kyn (Russian: Кын) is a rural locality (a selo) in Lysva, Perm Krai, Russia. The population was 805 as of 2010. The population is predominantly engaged in agriculture. There are 14 streets.

== Geography ==
Kyn is located 86 km southeast of Lysva (the district's administrative centre) by road. Kyn (settlement) is the nearest rural locality.
