= Primorsky Boulevard (1988 television miniseries) =

- Written by: Anatoli Shajkevich
- Directed by: Aleksandr Polynnikov
- Music by: Vyacheslav Dobrynin
- Country of origin: Soviet Union
- Original language: Russian
- No. of episodes: 2

Production
- Running time: 2 hours (approx)
- Production company: Odessa Film Studio

Original release
- Network: Soviet Central Television
- Release: 6 June 1988

Primorsky Boulevard (Russian: Приморский бульвар, romanised: Primorsky bulvar) is a 1988 Soviet musical comedy TV miniseries, directed by Aleksandr Polynnikov.
