= Rzhevsky Versus Napoleon =

2012 Russian-Ukrainian film

Rzhevsky versus Napoleon
- Theatrical release poster
- Directed by: Maryus Vaysberg
- Written by: Andriy Yakovliev; Mykhailo Savin
- Produced by: Sergey Livnev; Serhiy Shefir; Borys Shefir; Volodymyr Zelenskyy; Andriy Yakovliev
- Starring: Pavel Derevyanko; Volodymyr Zelenskyy; Svetlana Khodchenkova; Mikhail Galustyan; Jean-Claude Van Damme
- Cinematography: Irek Khartovich
- Music by: Vladimir Saiko
- Production companies: Central Partnership; Leopolis; Kvartal 95 Studio
- Release date: January 18, 2012
- Running time: 80 minutes
- Countries: Russia; Ukraine
- Language: Russian
- Budget: $8.5 million
- Box office: $7.8 million

Rzhevsky Versus Napoleon (Russian: «Ржевский против Наполеона», romanized: Rzhevsky protiv Napoleona; alternatively titled Corporal vs. Napoleon) is a Russian-Ukrainian 2012 historical comedy film directed by Maryus Vaysberg. A sequel to the 2008 film Hitler Goes Kaput!, it stars Pavel Derevyanko and Volodymyr Zelenskyy as the titlular characters Lieutenant Rzhevsky and Napoleon respectively, alongside Svetlana Khodchenkova and Mikhail Galustyan.

== Plot ==
In early 19th-century Russia, as Napoleon Bonaparte's (Volodymyr Zelenskyy) forces advance on Moscow, General Kutuzov devises a bold plan to delay him. Knowing Napoleon's weakness for women, he recruits the notorious charmer Lieutenant Rzhevsky (Pavel Derevyanko), who is serving a sentence for his scandalous behavior. In exchange for freedom, Rzhevsky must disguise himself as "Countess Rzhevskaya" and seduce Napoleon to buy Russia time. Rzhevsky captivates Napoleon at a grand ball, but his mission is complicated when he falls for Natasha Rostova (Svetlana Khodchenkova), the reigning Miss Moscow, who unknowingly criticizes him for associating with the enemy. Rzhevsky juggles his feelings for Natasha and his duty, as he struggles to maintain his cover amid escalating romantic entanglements and Napoleon's advances.

The deception comes to a head as Natasha discovers Rzhevsky's identity, and Napoleon learns the truth, enraged by the ruse. Rzhevsky ultimately succeeds in delaying Napoleon's campaign, allowing the Russian army to regroup. The lovers escape to Paris, while Napoleon, defeated and disgruntled, is left to contemplate his downfall. In a final gesture, Rzhevsky lightens the moment by inviting Napoleon to share a croissant, symbolizing the triumph of Russian wit over French ambition.

== Cast ==
- Pavel Derevyanko as Lieutenant Rzhevsky
- Volodymyr Zelenskyy as Napoleon
- Svetlana Khodchenkova as Natasha Rostova
- Mikhail Galustyan as Marquis de Mazo Sad
- Mikhail Yefremov as Leo Tolstoy
- Marat Basharov as Pyotr Bagration
- Yevhen Koshovyi as Lefty
- Ksenia Sobchak as Madame Xue-Xue
- Anna Semenovich as Ostrozhskaya
- Anfisa Chekhova as realtor
- Jean-Claude Van Damme as himself
- Vladimir Simonov as Mikhail Kutuzov
- Dmitry Mukhamedev as Michel Ney
- Ilya Oleynikov as Demian
- Potap as Gopnik
- Viktor Gusev as himself
- Ruslana Pysanka as Madame Golovina
- Tatyana Orlova as Juju
- Yuri Galtsev as mayor
- Alexander Pershin as Butler
- Alexey Diveev-Church as the leader of the news
- Irina Novak as barmaid of the beauty salon

== Production ==
The film was initially planned to be titled Napoleon Goes Kaput! («Наполеон капут!»).

Actor Jean-Claude Van Damme agreed to star in the film for free, with only his lodging expenses paid.

== Reception ==
The film received mostly negative reviews.
