= Zinovy Vysokovsky =

Russian actor and performer (1932–2009)

- Born: Zinovy Moiseevich Vysokovsky; November 28, 1932; Taganrog, USSR
- Died: August 3, 2009 (aged 76); Moscow, Russia
- Occupation: Actor
- Spouse: Lyubov Efimovna Vysokovskaya

Zinovy Moiseevich Vysokovsky (Russian: Зиновий Моисеевич Высоковский; 28 November 1932 – 3 August 2009) was a Soviet and Russian theater and movie actor and variety performer. In 1978 he was awarded the People's Artist of the RSFSR. He was born in Taganrog, USSR.

== Biography ==
In 1952 Zinovy Vysokovsky graduated with honors from the Chekhov Gymnasium. He went to Moscow with the intention to enter the Shchukin Drama School. He failed to be accepted and instead got an education in automation and space telemechanics at the Taganrog State University of Radioengineering. At the same time he kept trying to enter the Shchukin School and finally succeeded in 1957.

In 1961 Vysokovsky joined the troupe of the Moscow Miniature Theatre.

Vysokovsky earned popularity as an actor both on stage and screen. In the regular television program Pub "13 Chairs" he played the part of Pan Zyuzya from 1967. Vysokovsky also worked as a comedian in a number of solo programs.

== Death ==
He died on the 77th year of life on the night of Monday, August 3, 2009 in Moscow.

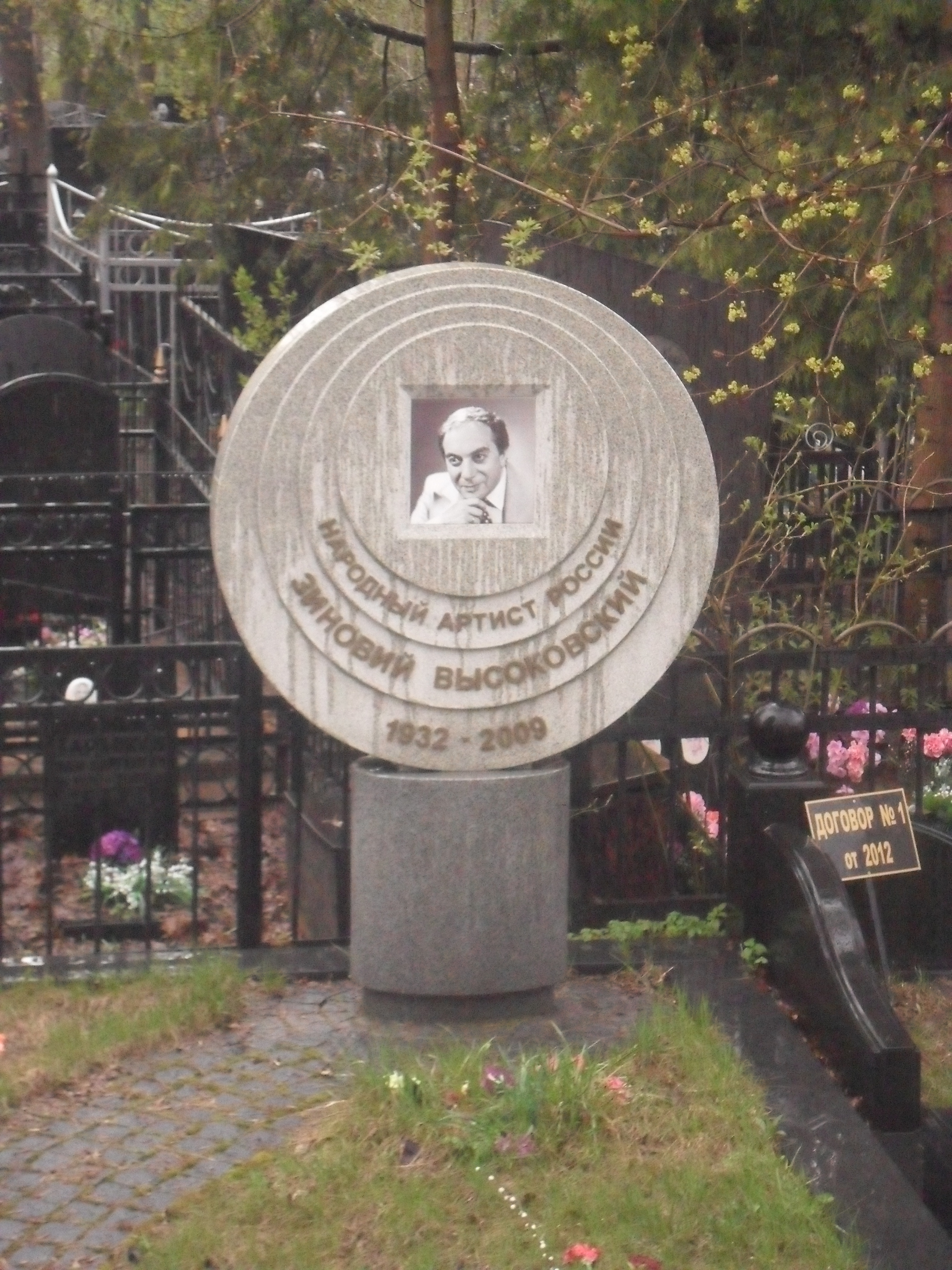

== Filmography ==
- 1964 – The Alive and the Dead as Mikhail Weinstein
- 1965 – Švejk in World War II as Švejk
- 1965 – The Friends Through the Years as Grisha
- 1968 – Once More About Love as Pyotr Borisovich Halperin
- 1969 – Small Restaurant ‘13 Chairs’' as Pan Zyuzya
- 1974 – The Marriage of Figaro as Bartolo
- 1975 – Small Comedies of the Big House as Tengiz
- 1982 – Through the Looking Glass as Tweedledum (voice)
- 2006 – The Soviet Park as steward at a funeral
