= Hussar Ballad =

- A 1962 poster for the Hussar Ballad
- Directed by: Eldar Ryazanov
- Written by: Eldar Ryazanov; Aleksandr Gladkov
- Starring: Larisa Golubkina; Yury Yakovlev; Igor Ilyinsky; Tatyana Shmyga
- Music by: Tikhon Khrennikov
- Distributed by: Mosfilm
- Release dates: 1962 (Soviet Union); July 13, 1963 (United States)
- Running time: 96 min.
- Country: Soviet Union
- Language: Russian

The Hussar Ballad (Russian: Гусарская баллада, romanized: Gusarskaya ballada) is a 1962 Soviet musical film by Eldar Ryazanov, filmed at Mosfilm. In effect, it is one of the best-loved musical comedies in Russia.

With most of its dialogue delivered in verse, Ryazanov's script romanticizes the adventures of the historical transgender man Aleksandr Aleksandrov (Note: Scholars have evaluated Aleksandre Aleksandrov as a transgender man according with his want to be known as a man during his lifetime.) during the Napoleonic Wars. The film contains a rapid plot, along with ironic acting flourishes, as well as memorable operetta pieces. The film's musical score and songs were written by Tikhon Khrennikov.

The leading roles — those of the cavalry maiden Shurochka Azarova and the dashing hussar Poruchik Dmitry Rzhevsky — were played by Andrei Mironov's future wife Larisa Golubkina and the People's Artist of the USSR Yuri Yakovlev, respectively. Comedian Igor Ilyinsky appeared as the one-eyed Field-Marshal Prince Mikhail Kutuzov.

The film is based on the play A Long Time Ago by Alexander Gladkov.

The film proved so popular with Soviet audiences that Poruchik Rzhevsky became quite a folklore character, featured in numerous jokes.

== Plot ==
The film begins in the summer of 1812, when Lieutenant Rzhevsky arrives at the home of retired Major Azarov with a letter of introduction. The major's 17-year-old niece, Alexandra (Shura), is Rzhevsky's "betrothed by proxy," though the two have never met. Rzhevsky imagines her as a delicate and sentimental woman, but Shura, raised by her military uncle and his orderly Ivan, is far from conventional. She rides horses, fences, and shoots with precision. Their first encounter occurs as Shura, dressed in a cornet’s uniform for a masquerade ball, overhears Rzhevsky's less-than-flattering account of their engagement. Amused, she decides to play a prank, later presenting herself as an overly mannered and powdered young lady.

During Shura’s birthday ball, news arrives of Napoleon's invasion of Russia. Rzhevsky and the other officers return to their regiments, and Shura resolves to join the fight in secret. Disguised as a cornet, she earns her first combat experience the next day by delivering critical orders while evading French soldiers. Her bravery impresses a Russian general, who appoints her as a junior adjutant. Over six months of service, Shura gains a reputation as a fearless soldier, with no one suspecting her true identity—not even Rzhevsky. Her secret is revealed only when an old family acquaintance informs Field Marshal Kutuzov, who initially orders her to return home. However, after learning of her heroics, including rescuing a general from French captivity, Kutuzov awards her the Cross of St. George and allows her to retain her rank.

In the film's climax, Shura apologizes to her comrades for her deception, while Rzhevsky admits his mistake in underestimating her character. The two confess their love, and Shura agrees to marry him, bringing the story to a heartwarming conclusion. The film combines themes of patriotism, courage, and humor with a romantic subplot, set against the backdrop of the Napoleonic Wars.

== Cast ==
- Larisa Golubkina as Shura Azarova
- Yury Yakovlev as Poruchik Dmitry Rzhevsky
- Igor Ilyinsky as Field-Marshal Kutuzov
- Nikolai Kryuchkov as Ivan
- Viktor Koltsov as Major Azarov
- Antoni Khodursky as Count Nurin
- Tatyana Shmyga as Louise Germont
- Lev Polyakov as Pelymov
- Yuri Belov as hussar-partisan

== Interesting facts ==
- The director was planning to take Alisa Freindlich for the leading role. She was even auditioned several times for the role. No one doubted that she would get the role. However, at the last moment, Larisa Golubkina, who was not known to anyone yet, was confirmed for the role of Shurochka. It was her debut in the movie.
- Before Freindlich, Lyudmila Gurchenko, Valentina Malyavina, Tatyana Nikulina and Svetlana Nemolyaeva were auditioned for the role of Shurochka.
- The film was made especially for the 150th anniversary of the Battle of Borodino. The premiere of the film was held September 7, 1962, the day of the battle, in the Moscow cinema "Russia".
- A few of the costumes created for the film War and Peace were used during the filming.
- Sergei Yursky and Vyacheslav Tikhonov were first auditioned for the role of Lieutenant Rzhevsky.
