= Larisa Golubkina =

Russian actress (1940–2025)

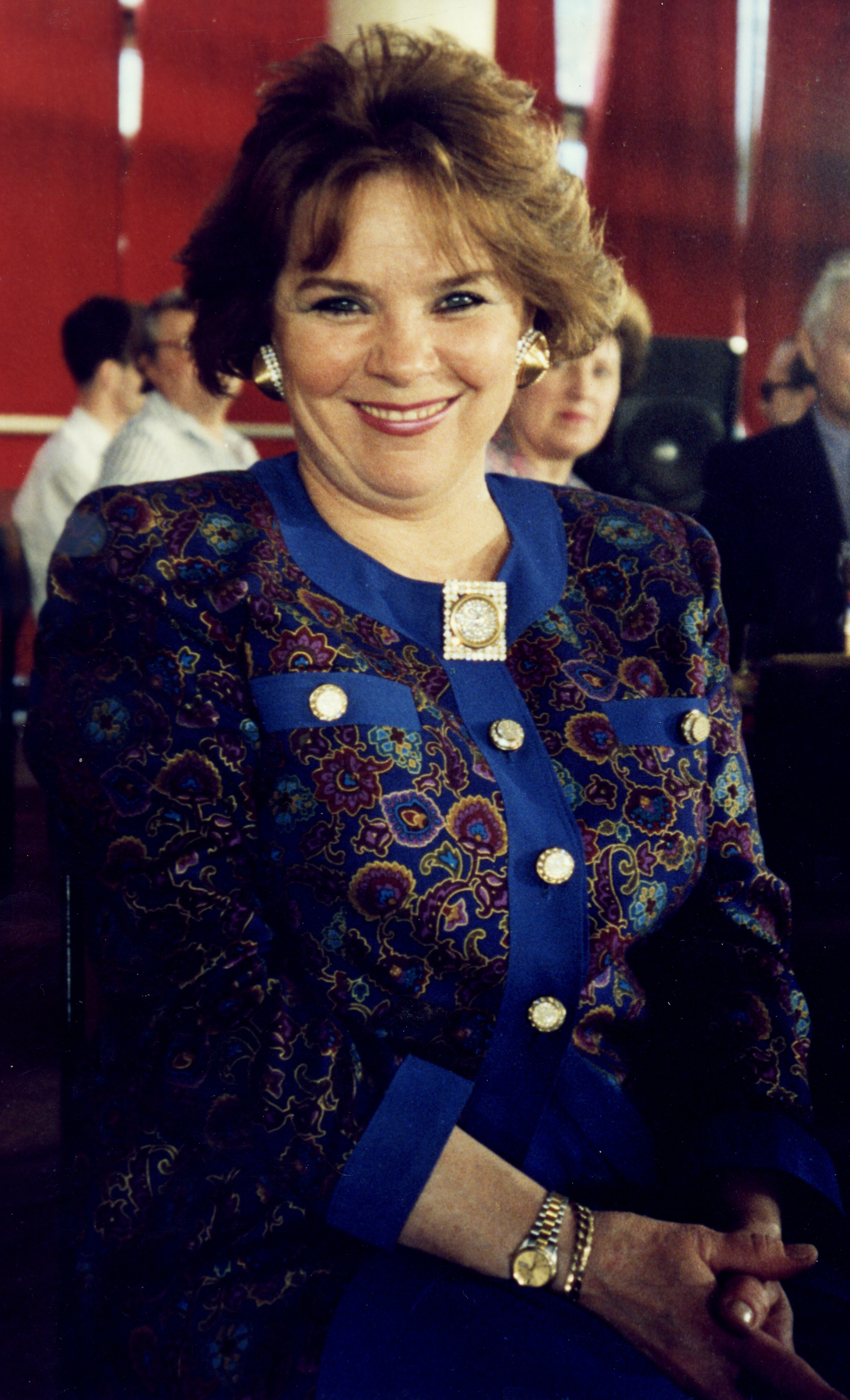
- Born: March 9, 1940; Moscow, Russian SFSR, Soviet Union
- Died: March 22, 2025 (aged 85); Moscow, Russia
- Education: Lunacharsky State Institute for Theatre Arts
- Occupations: Actress; singer; television presenter
- Years active: 1962–2025
- Spouse: Andrei Mironov (m. 1977; died 1987)
- Children: Maria Golubkina
- Awards: Order of Friendship

Larisa Ivanovna Golubkina (Russian: Лариса Ивановна Голубкина; March 9, 1940 – March 22, 2025) was a Soviet and later Russian actress and singer.

== Life and career ==
Golubkina was born on March 9, 1940. She entered the Moscow Musical School in 1955, graduating after four years, and then enrolled in the Lunacharsky State Institute for Theatre Arts. During her studies, she made her screen debut in the 1962 comedy Hussar Ballad, in the role of Shurochka Azarova. Golubkina matriculated in 1964, becoming a regular actor at the Russian Army Theatre. She appeared in some twenty movies and in numerous theater productions. In 1991, she was declared a People's Artist of the RSFSR, and in 2000 was awarded the Order of Friendship. She also received the Order of the Badge of Honour twice.

Golubkina was the second wife of the late Andrei Mironov. Her daughter is the actress Maria Golubkina. Larisa Golubkina died on March 22, 2025, at the age of 85.

== Selected filmography ==
- Hussar Ballad (1962) – Shura Azarova
- A Day of Happiness (1963) – Rita
- Give Me a Book of Complaints (1965) – Tatyana Shumova
- The Tale of Tsar Saltan (1966) – Queen
- Liberation (1971) – Zoya, nurse
- Three Men in a Boat (1979) – Anne
