= Rzhevsky family =

Russian noble family

The Rzhevsky family Рже́вские
- boyar/noble family
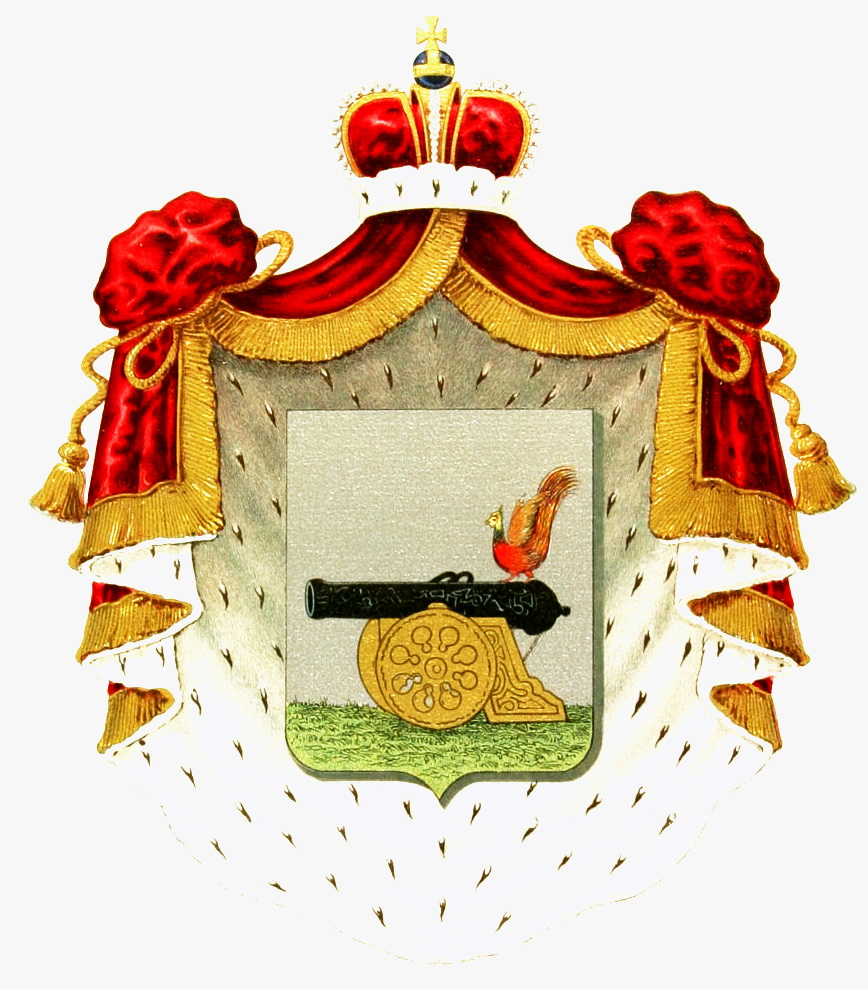
- Coat-of-arms of the Rzhevsky family
- Parent family: Rostislavichi of Smolensk
- Current region: Russia
- Origin: Rzhev, Russia
- Founded: 14th century
- Founder: Prince Fyodor Fyodorovich of Rzhev

The House of Rzhevsky (Russian: Рже́вские) is a Russian noble family descended from the Rostislavichi of Smolensk branch of Rurik dynasty.

== History ==
The Rzhevskys are descended from Prince Fyodor Fyodorovich of Rzhev, the son of Fyodor Konstantinovich the Younger, from the reigning family of the Fomin domain (now extinct), an appanage of the Smolensk principality. In 1315 Prince Fyodor Fyodorovich of Rzhev was sent by Prince Yury Danilovich of Moscow to Veliky Novgorod to defend it from the Grand Duke of Tver, Mikhail Yaroslavich. The Novgorodians gave him away to the Duke of Tver, who took over his domain. Since then, his descendants were non-titled.

The Rzhevsky family is listed in the Part 6 (ancient nobility) of the genealogical books of Voronezh, Kostroma, Kursk, Moscow, Oryol, Ryazan, Saint-Petersburg, Tambov and Tver.

== Notable members ==
- Rodion Fyodorovich Rzhevsky was a voivode killed in action at the Battle of Kulikovo.
- Matvey Mikhailovich Rzhevsky was a boyar who escorted Princess Helena of Moscow, a fiancée of King Alexander of Jagiellon to Lithuania in 1495.
- Nikita Grigoryevich Rzhevsky was a boyar scion, a voivode at Dankov and Ryazan; participated in the Livonian war.
- Ivan Nikitich Rzhevsky (d. 1611) was a participant in the Time of Trouble; he actively sided with the pro-Polish party, received the rank of okolnichy from King Sigismund III, and was one of the signers for his son, Wladislaw, to be elected to the Russian throne. In 1601 was an envoy to Copenhagen.
- Matvey Ivanovich Rzhevsky (d. after 1579) was a boyar scion, one of the first heads of the streltsy, the viceroy at Putivl, Chernigov and Ryazhsk. Participated in the siege of Kazan. He took part in a campaign against the Crimean Khanate in 1556, when with a troop of Cossacks he captured a few Turkish strongholds. In 1559 he took part in another Crimean campaign as one of the voivodes. In 1565—1566 he participated in a campaign in Kabarda assisting the local prince Temryuk Idarovich in a warfare with his rivals. In 1579 as a voivode he participated in the defense of Polotsk against King Stephen Bathory; Polotsk surrendered to the Polish-Lithuanian troops and M. Rzhevsky was captured.
- Elizary Leontievich Rzhevsky (d. 1599) was an okolnichy, voivode and an envoy to Crimean Khanate (1564 and 1572) and the Polish-Lithuanian Commonwealth. Upon the death of King Stephen Bathory, in 1587 he visited Poland with a suggestion to elect Tsar Fyodor Ivanovich King of Poland.
- Ivan Stepanovich Rzhevsky (d. 1611) was the viceroy at Shatsk and an envoy of Boris Godunov to Denmark in 1601.
- Yuri Alekseevich Rzhevsky (1674 — 1729) was the Governor of Nizhny Novgorod (1719—1728)
- Vladimir Alekseevich Rzhevsky (b. 1865 — ?) was a Russian politician. He was a deputy at the 4th State Imperial Duma. After the February Revolution, he was a member of the Provisional Committee of the State Duma, and in June 1917 he stepped down from his office. Until 1923 he was the principal of the school # 30, the former girls' boarding school owned by his wife.
