= Tashkov =

Tashkov is a surname of Slavic origin. Notable people with this surname include:

- Andrey Tashkov (born 1957), Soviet film actor
- Dobromir Tashkov (1925–2017), Bulgarian footballer
- Yevgeny Tashkov (1926–2012), Soviet film director and actor
