= Vanyushin's Children =

- Russian: Дети Ванюшина
- Directed by: Yevgeny Tashkov
- Written by: Sergey Naydyonov; Yevgeny Tashkov
- Starring: Boris Andreyev; Nina Zorskaya; Aleksandr Kaydanovsky; Lyudmila Gurchenko; Valentina Sharykina
- Cinematography: Valentin Zheleznyakov
- Edited by: L. Kuznetsova
- Music by: Andrey Eshpay
- Production company: Mosfilm
- Release date: 1973
- Running time: 97 minutes
- Country: Soviet Union
- Language: Russian

Vanyushin's Children (Russian: Дети Ванюшина) is a 1973 Soviet drama film directed by Yevgeny Tashkov.

The film tells about the life of the Vanyushins merchant family, whose members are very different from each other.

== Plot ==
The events in the film take place in a large provincial city, centering on the turbulent family life of merchant Alexander Yegorovich Vanyushin, a respected member of the town council. Vanyushin lives in a sprawling household with his wife, Arina Ivanovna, their four daughters, two sons, and his niece, Lena. However, the family is far from harmonious, with each member harboring secrets and deceit. His younger son, Alexei, a 17-year-old student, secretly visits his lover but lies to his father about his whereabouts, while Lena and Vanyushin's elder son, Konstantin, conceal their romantic relationship. The drama escalates when Ludmila, Vanyushin's second daughter, unexpectedly returns home, fleeing her abusive husband, Stepan Krasavin, who drinks heavily, beats her, and blames her parents for not providing a dowry. Yet, it soon emerges that Krasavin's anger stems from Ludmila's pre-marital affair with her sister's husband, Pavel Shchetkin, a fact only her sister, Klavdia, had known.

As tensions mount, Alexei is expelled from school for repeated absence, caused by his affair with a choir girl and financial troubles, leading him to steal from his mother. Krasavin arrives demanding 15,000 rubles to restore Ludmila's honor and take her back, threatening to tarnish Vanyushin's reputation and credit if unpaid. Vanyushin pleads with Konstantin to marry a wealthy bride to save the family's business, but Konstantin refuses to wed for money. Meanwhile, Shchetkin exposes Konstantin's affair with Lena, prompting Konstantin to send her away under the pretext of visiting her mother, despite her pregnancy. Feeling the strain of his fractured family, Vanyushin attempts to mend relationships and urges Ludmila to avoid returning to Krasavin. However, Ludmila sees no better life at home and leaves for Moscow, while Alexei departs for St. Petersburg, seeking a fresh start.

Months later, Konstantin assumes control of the household, expelling Klavdia and her family while planning a marriage to Inna Kukarnikova, a socially prominent woman. When Lena's pregnancy threatens to surface, Konstantin decides to disclose his version of the truth to Inna, only to be stunned when she admits she has her own past. Meanwhile, Vanyushin, no longer the head of his own house, leaves under the guise of buying a gift for the bride-to-be. Overwhelmed by his family's betrayals and failures, Vanyushin ultimately takes his own life, leaving behind a household consumed by selfish ambitions and shattered dreams.

== Cast ==
- Boris Andreyev as Aleksandr Vanyushin (as B. Andreyev)
- Nina Zorskaya as Arina Ivanovna Vanyushina (as N. Zorskaya)
- Aleksandr Kaydanovsky as Kostya (as A. Kaydanovskiy)
- Lyudmila Gurchenko as Klavdiya Shchyotkina (as L. Gurchenko)
- Valentina Sharykina as Valentina Krasavina (as V. Sharykina)
- Aleksandr Voevodin as Aleksey Vanyushin (as A. Voevodin)
- Oleg Golubitsky as Pavel Shchyotkin (as O. Golubitskiy)
- Viktor Pavlov as Krasavin Fyodorovich (as V. Pavlov)
- Elena Solovey as Lenochka (as Ye. Solovey)
