= Tatyana Lyutaeva =

Soviet, Lithuanian and Russian theater actress (born 1965)

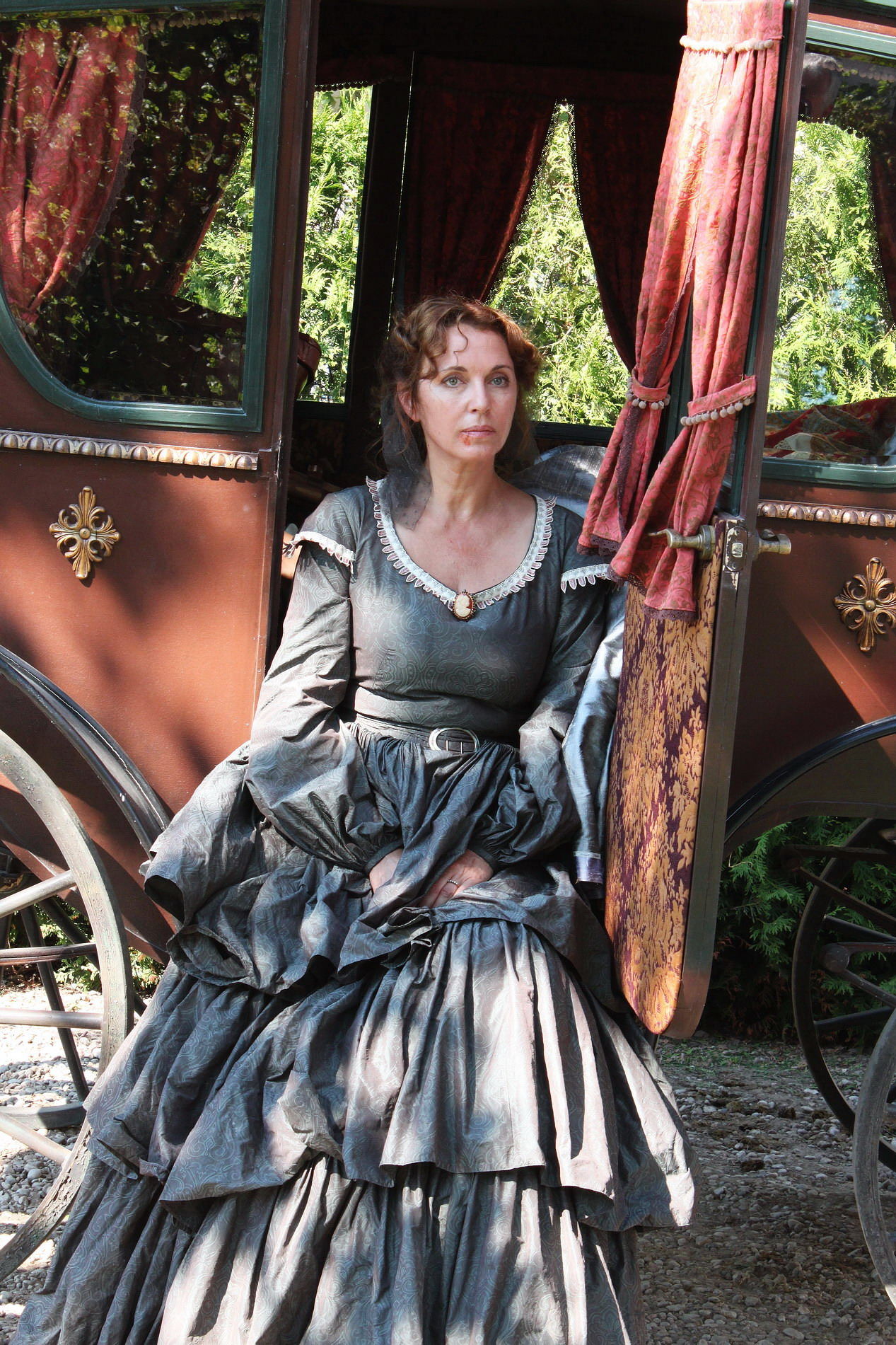
- Tatyana Lyutaeva on the shooting of the Lithuania film Tadas Blinda. Pradžia (2010).
- Born: Tatyana Borisovna Lyutaeva; 12 March 1965 (age 60); Odesa, Ukraine SSR, Soviet Union
- Citizenship: Soviet Union → Lithuania → Russia
- Occupation: Actress
- Years active: 1987–present
- Relatives: Agnia Ditkovskyte (daughter)
- Awards: Honored Artist of the Russian Federation (2014)

Tatyana Borisovna Lyutaeva (Russian: Татьяна Борисовна Лютаева, born 12 March 1965) is a Soviet, Lithuanian, Russian theater actress, Honored Artist of the Russian Federation (2014). Member of the Union of Cinematographers of the Russian Federation.

== Biography ==
In 1986 she graduated from the acting department of the Gerasimov Institute of Cinematography.

However, shortly after the shooting, Tatyana Lyutaeva left with her husband Olegas Ditkovskis in Vilnius, Lithuania, where from 1988 to 2004 she worked in the Russian Drama Theatre of Lithuania, organized festivals "Russian Cinema", continued to appear in films.

In 2004, together with her two children, she returned to Moscow and began to actively participate in film and television.

On 2 May 2014, by decree of the President of the Russian Federation Vladimir Putin, Tatyana Lyutaeva was awarded the honorary title of Honored Artist of the Russian Federation.

== Filmography ==
Year	Title	Role	Notes
1987	Gardes-Marines, Ahead!	Anastasia Yaguzhinskaya	
1988	The Lady with the Parrot	Milochka	
1991	Viva Gardes-Marines!	Anastasia Yaguzhinskaya	
1991	Behind the Last Line	Irina	
1992	Black Square	Alla	
1992	Over the Dark Water	Clara	
1993	You Exist...	Yulia	
1999	Women's Property	Zoya Borschevskaya	
2003	One Life	Maryana	
2005	Yesenin	Olga	television series
2006	The Sword Bearer	Bella	
2006	Heat	Alexei's mother	
2006	Wolfhound	Lekarka	
2008	The Circus Princess	Sofya	television series
2009	The Best Movie 2	Nadezhda Vasilievna Sheveleva	
2009	The Man Who Knew Everything	Raisa Alekseevna	
2010/11	Wedding Ring	Zhanna	television series
2011	Boris Godunov	tavern owner	
2011	Lavrova's Method	Antonina Lavrova, widow of the general	television series
2011	Lucky Trouble	Galina Aleksandrovna's friend	
2011	Brief Guide To A Happy Life	Olga	
2012	Lavrova's Method 2	Antonina Lavrova, widow of the general	television series
2012	Gulf Stream Under the Iceberg	gypsy Lola	television series
2016	The Heritage of Love	Duchess Chernisheva	
2017	Anna Karenina: Vronsky's Story	Countess Vronskaya	
