= Adam and Eve (1969 film) =

- Russian: Адам и Хева
- Directed by: Alexey Korenev
- Written by: Akhmed Abu-Bakar
- Starring: Frunzik Mkrtchyan; Yekaterina Vasilyeva; Gogi Gegechkori; Yevgeny Lebedev; Lyubov Dobrzhanskaya; Bariat Muradova
- Cinematography: Anatoliy Kuznetsov
- Edited by: Mariya Karyova
- Music by: Murad Kazhlayev
- Release date: 1969
- Running time: 71 minute
- Country: Soviet Union
- Language: Russian

Adam and Eve (Russian: Адам и Хева) is a 1969 Soviet comedy film directed by Alexey Korenev.

According to Sharia law, a husband who has divorced his wife can return her only if her next husband divorces her. Undertaker Bekir wants to get his wife back and so he marries her to a hairdresser named Adam.

== Plot ==
The story is set in a highland village in Dagestan. Bekir, a gravedigger, burns himself with hot soup and, in a fit of anger, drives his wife, Heva, out of their home. He soon regrets his actions and wants to bring her back. However, according to Sharia law, this can only happen if she marries another man and is subsequently divorced by him. Bekir arranges for his now ex-wife to temporarily marry Adam, a bachelor barber, so she can return to him as soon as possible.

However, neither Adam nor Heva is willing to part ways.

During a heated argument between Bekir and Adam, the barber mysteriously disappears, and Bekir is accused of his murder. Meanwhile, a kaptar (a snowman-like creature) begins to haunt the mountains, its cries echoing through the area. Fleeing from the authorities, Bekir escapes the village and eventually encounters Adam, alive and well, hiding in the mountains and mistaken for the kaptar. The gravedigger and the barber reconcile and return to the village.

Soon after, the villagers relocate to the plains. Heva chooses to stay with Adam.

== Cast ==
- Frunzik Mkrtchyan
- Yekaterina Vasilyeva
- Gogi Gegechkori
- Yevgeny Lebedev
- Lyubov Dobrzhanskaya
- Anastasia Voznesenskaya
- Bariat Muradova
- Ramaz Giorgobiani
- Ivan Kuznetsov
- Yefim Kopelyan
