= Boris Godunov (disambiguation) =

Boris Godunov (1551–1605) was a Russian tsar.

Boris Godunov may also refer to:

- Boris Godunov (opera) (1874) by Modest Mussorgsky
- Boris Godunov (play) (1831) by Alexander Pushkin
- Boris Godunov (1954 film), adaptation of Mussorgsky's opera
- Boris Godunov (1986 film), adaptation of Pushkin's play
- Boris Godunov (1989 film), adaptation of Mussorgsky's opera
- Boris Godunov (2011 film), adaptation of Pushkin’s play

== See also ==
- Boris Goudenow, 1710 opera by Johann Mattheson
- Boris Badenov, namesake character
