= Ekaterina Savinova =

Soviet actress and singer

- Born: Ekaterina Fyodorovna Savinova; 26 December 1926; Yeltsovka village, Siberian Krai, RSFSR, USSR
- Died: 25 April 1970 (aged 43); Novosibirsk, RSFSR, USSR
- Occupations: Actress, singer
- Years active: 1946–1970
- Spouse: Yevgeny Tashkov (m. 1950)
- Children: Andrey Tashkov

Ekaterina Fyodorovna Savinova (Russian: Екатерина Фёдоровна Савинова; 26 December 1926 – 25 April 1970) was a Soviet theatre and film actress and singer most famous for the leading role in the comedy movie Come Tomorrow, Please... directed by her husband Yevgeny Tashkov. She was named Meritorious Artist of the RSFSR in 1965.

== Early life ==
Ekaterina Savinova was born in the Yeltsovka village (modern-day Yeltsovsky District, Altai Krai of Russia) into a peasant family, the youngest of four children. Her ancestors, originally from Penza Governorate, resettled in Siberia during the Stolypin reform. Her father Fyodor Yakovlevich Savinov worked in kolkhoz. Savinova inherited her singing talent from her mother Maria Semyonovna Savinova. She finished a secondary school and in August 1944 left for Moscow to enter acting courses. She was too late for exams, so she studied in a farming university and in half a year entered an additional VGIK course launched by Vasili Vanin. She was soon dismissed "for the lack of acting skills", but this didn't stop her, and during the next summer she became a VGIK student under Boris Bibikov and his wife Olga Pyzhova.

She studied along with her future husband Yevgeny Tashkov. They graduated in 1950 and in a year they got married. In 1957 their son Andrey Tashkov was born (also a popular Russian actor). After VGIK Savinova entered the Gnessin State Musical College to study vocals. Her rare voice (3.5 octave) was so impressive that she was offered to perform at the Bolshoi Theatre and pop scene upon graduation, yet she declined all offers, because she saw herself only as a cinema actress and "just enjoyed singing on her own".

== Career ==
She played her first big role in 1949 in the musical comedy Cossacks of the Kuban where she also performed the singing parts. According to Tashkov, director Ivan Pyryev (who also served as the head of Mosfilm at the time) tried to seduce Savinova. She slapped Pyryev in the face, and after that he used his influence to ruin her career. For many years she appeared only in supporting or episodic roles. Nevertheless, she received the Best Acting Award at the 1955 Cannes Film Festival along with other actors of A Big Family. From 1952 on she also performed at the National Film Actors' Theatre.

In 1961 Tashkov decided to produce his own comedy movie with his wife in the leading role. Together they wrote a screenplay which turned to be partially autobiographical. The heroine – named after Savinova's childhood friend Frosya Burlakova – was also a young girl with a unique voice who arrived to Moscow from a small Siberian village Yeltsovka hoping to enter the Gnessin College, too late for exams. Many comic episodes were also "borrowed" from real life. In addition to all singing parts, Savinova also voiced one of the characters – Maria Semyonovna, an elderly housekeeper named after her mother. Tashkov, in turn, voiced the leading male character played by Anatoli Papanov.

== Illness and death ==
During the shooting Tashkov revealed that his wife had been suffering from high temperature for a long time, yet kept quiet about it. At one point they had to call ambulance. He insisted on physical examination. After going through many checks Savinova was finally diagnosed with brucellosis: she got infected by drinking unpasteurized milk. The shooting had to be delayed for a year.

When the film was finished, it turned a great success. Savinova was named the best actress at the 1964 All-Union Film Festival. In 1965 she was named the Meritorious Artist of the RSFSR. The spouses then toured around the country with concerts where Tashkov talked about filmmaking and Savinova performed with songs. During that time she started complaining about "hearing voices". Turned out brucellosis touched her brain and nervous system which led to sluggish schizophrenia (The diagnosis has long been discredited because of its scientific inadequacy and its use as a means of confining USSR political dissenters.) From then on Savinova's health had been slowly decreasing. She had to take a lot of medicine and spent months in mental clinics.

She continued touring with concerts and acting. In 1964 she played another notable role in the comedy Balzaminov's Marriage, yet the illness had been progressing, and Savinova felt it. In 1970 she suddenly left for Novosibirsk and spent a month with her sister. On 25 April 1970 Savinova left for Moscow, arrived to a local train station and threw herself under the passing train. "Just like Anna Karenina whose monologue she read during the entry exams at VGIK", as Tashkov later recalled.

Savinova was buried at the Kleshchikhinskoye Cemetery in Novosibirsk. During the lifetime she was very religious, and her husband insisted on conducting a memorial service in the Russian Orthodox traditions. In 2006 the tomb was moved to a better part of the cemetery and renewed.

== Memory ==
In 1995 Leonid Filatov dedicated the 9th episode of his long-running documentary series To Be Remembered to Savinova.

In 2011 during the 85th anniversary of Savinova's birth a Museum of Ekaterina Savinova was opened in the Yeltsovka village.

Same year a book of memoirs and other writings left by the actress, Light of the Faded Star: Ekaterina Savinova, was published.

Also in 2011 the movie Come Tomorrow, Please... was restored, colorized and shown on Channel One Russia.

== Selected filmography ==
Year	English Title	Original Title	Role
1946	Life Pages	Страницы жизни	Katya Sorokina
1949	Cossacks of the Kuban	Кубанские казаки	Lubochka
1953	Chuk and Gek	Чук и Гек	mail carrier (uncredited)
1953	Mysterious Discovery	Таинственная находка	Ekaterina Sotnikova
1953	Alyosha Ptitsyn Grows Up	Алёша Птицын вырабатывает характер	ice cream vendor (uncredited)
1954	A Big Family	Большая семья	Dunyasha Zhurbina
1955	The Shadow Near the Pier	Тень у пирса	Klava Shubina
1959	Ballad of a Soldier	Баллада о солдате	conductor (uncredited)
1963	Come Tomorrow, Please...	Приходите завтра…	Frosya Burlakova; Maria Semyonovna (voiceover)
1964	Balzaminov's Marriage	Женитьба Бальзаминова	Matryona
1964	Come Here, Mukhtar!	Ко мне, Мухтар!	Verochka
1968	Zigzag of Success	Зигзаг удачи	saleswoman (uncredited)
1970	Payback	Расплата	Annushka the neighbor
