= Mikhail Remizov =

Russian actor (1948–2015)

- Born: Mikhail Grigorievich Remizov; November 9, 1948; Moscow, USSR
- Died: September 17, 2015 (aged 66); Moscow, Russia
- Occupation: Actor
- Years active: 1972–2015

Mikhail Grigorievich Remizov (Russian: Михаил Григорьевич Ремизов; 9 November 1948 – 17 September 2015) was a Russian stage and film actor.

== Biography ==
In 1973 he graduated from the Moscow Art Theater School (Vasily Markov's course). A year earlier he starred in the television movie Big School-Break, and it was his first role in the cinema. He served in the Russian Army Theatre, Youth Theatre Krasnoyarsk, Tomsk Drama Theater, the Moscow Literary and Drama Theatre of the WTO and the New Drama Theatre.

Since 1996, he was the actor of the Stanislavsky Moscow Drama Theater.

== Death ==
He died on the night of September 17, 2015 of a heart attack aged 66. He was buried at the Vagankovo Cemetery.

== Selected filmography ==
- Big School-Break (1972)
- Seventeen Moments of Spring (1973)
- Newcomer (1977)
- Life Is Beautiful (1980)
- Muhtar's Return (2003)
- Kamenskaya (2005)
- Wedding Ring (2008)
