= Detective (1979 film) =

- Russian: Сыщик
- Directed by: Vladimir Fokin
- Written by: Vladimir Kuznetsov
- Starring: Andrey Tashkov; Boris Khimichev; Igor Kvasha; Nikolai Skorobogatov; Yuri Gusev
- Cinematography: Vyacheslav Yegorov
- Edited by: Tamara Belyayeva
- Music by: Eduard Artemyev
- Release date: 1979
- Running time: 134 minute
- Country: Soviet Union
- Language: Russian

Detective (Russian: Сыщик) is a 1979 Soviet crime action film directed by Vladimir Fokin.

Yevgeny Kulik, returning from the army, went to work in the militia. He wanted to fight big criminals and one day his dream came true.

== Plot ==
After finishing school and his military service, Zhenya Kulik attempts to enter law school but fails and is literally thrown out, thanks to a combat move he tries to show off to another candidate. His girlfriend Nina is disappointed, but they try to move forward by spending the evening together at a park. There, they encounter a group of young thugs who attack Kulik and attempt to assault Nina, only to be thwarted by a passing police officer. Kulik decides to delay his studies for a year and instead joins the police force, where his early efforts are met with amusement and frustration from his superiors. Eager for more action, he tackles even minor cases with enthusiasm but fails to grasp the scope of a police investigation, such as an assignment to track down missing laundry, which he tries to escalate to a full-blown case. Meanwhile, his boss, Major Sorokin, is preparing for an operation to capture a notorious gang led by the seasoned criminal "Paleny," responsible for murders, prison escapes, and organized thefts. Short on personnel, Sorokin reluctantly includes the inexperienced Kulik in the plan, assigning him to back up Lieutenant Guladze, who is traveling with the gang’s courier, Shpunko, to intercept stolen gold and forged documents.

As the mission unfolds, Kulik finds himself in a tense encounter on a train with Guladze and Shpunko, whose suspicions almost derail the operation when he discovers Kulik’s hidden gun. Although Guladze manages to restrain Shpunko, complications ensue, and police soon work with Shpunko to infiltrate the gang’s hideout. Following the courier, undercover officers track the gang to a remote house. However, "Paleny" orders his henchman to eliminate Shpunko after his delivery, a plan the police intercept in time. Realizing the hideout is compromised, the gang attempts to flee, but officers catch everyone except for Paleny, who escapes into the woods. In a dramatic showdown, Kulik pursues Paleny alone, eventually capturing him after a grueling struggle through trains and rivers, bringing the criminal to justice. Later, Kulik and Nina enjoy a brief vacation, only for Kulik to be called back to solve another seemingly trivial case. Despite his frustration, Sorokin reassures Kulik, recognizing his potential to become a skilled detective.

== Cast ==
- Andrey Tashkov as Kulik
- Boris Khimichev as Kolya
- Igor Kvasha as Klimov
- Nikolai Skorobogatov as Sorokin
- Yuri Gusev as Guladze
- Larisa Luzhina as Taisiya
- Aleksandr Pashutin as Shpunko
- Leonid Yarmolnik as Gnus
- Aleksey Zotov as Koshchey (as Aleksei Zotov)
- Nikolay Tyrin as Fomichov
