= Our House (1965 film) =

- Russian: Наш дом
- Directed by: Vasily Pronin
- Written by: Yevgeny Grigoryev
- Starring: Anatoliy Papanov; Nina Sazonova; Ivan Lapikov; Vadim Beroev; Aleksei Loktev
- Cinematography: Era Savelyeva
- Edited by: Nina Mayorova
- Music by: Nikolay Karetnikov
- Production company: Mosfilm
- Release date: 1965
- Running time: 99 minutes
- Country: Soviet Union
- Language: Russian

Our House (Russian: Наш дом) is a 1965 Soviet drama film directed by Vasily Pronin.

== Plot ==
The film tells about the Ivanov family. Three sons have become adults, they are going to leave the house, and their parents and younger brother will have to find the strength in themselves to put up with this.

== Cast ==
- Anatoliy Papanov as Father (as A. Papanov)
- Nina Sazonova as Mother (as N. Sazonova)
- Ivan Lapikov as Uncle Kolya (as I. Lapikov)
- Vadim Beroev as Nikolai (as V. Beroyev)
- Aleksei Loktev as Volodya (as A. Loktev)
- Olga Shakhova as Starushka (Olga's final film)
- Gennadiy Bortnikov
- Aleksandr Sesin
- Taysia Dodina as Nina (as T. Dodina)
- Nelli Kornienko as Tanya (as N. Korniyenko)
- Nikolai Barmin
