= Valentina Sharykina =

Soviet actress (1940–2025)

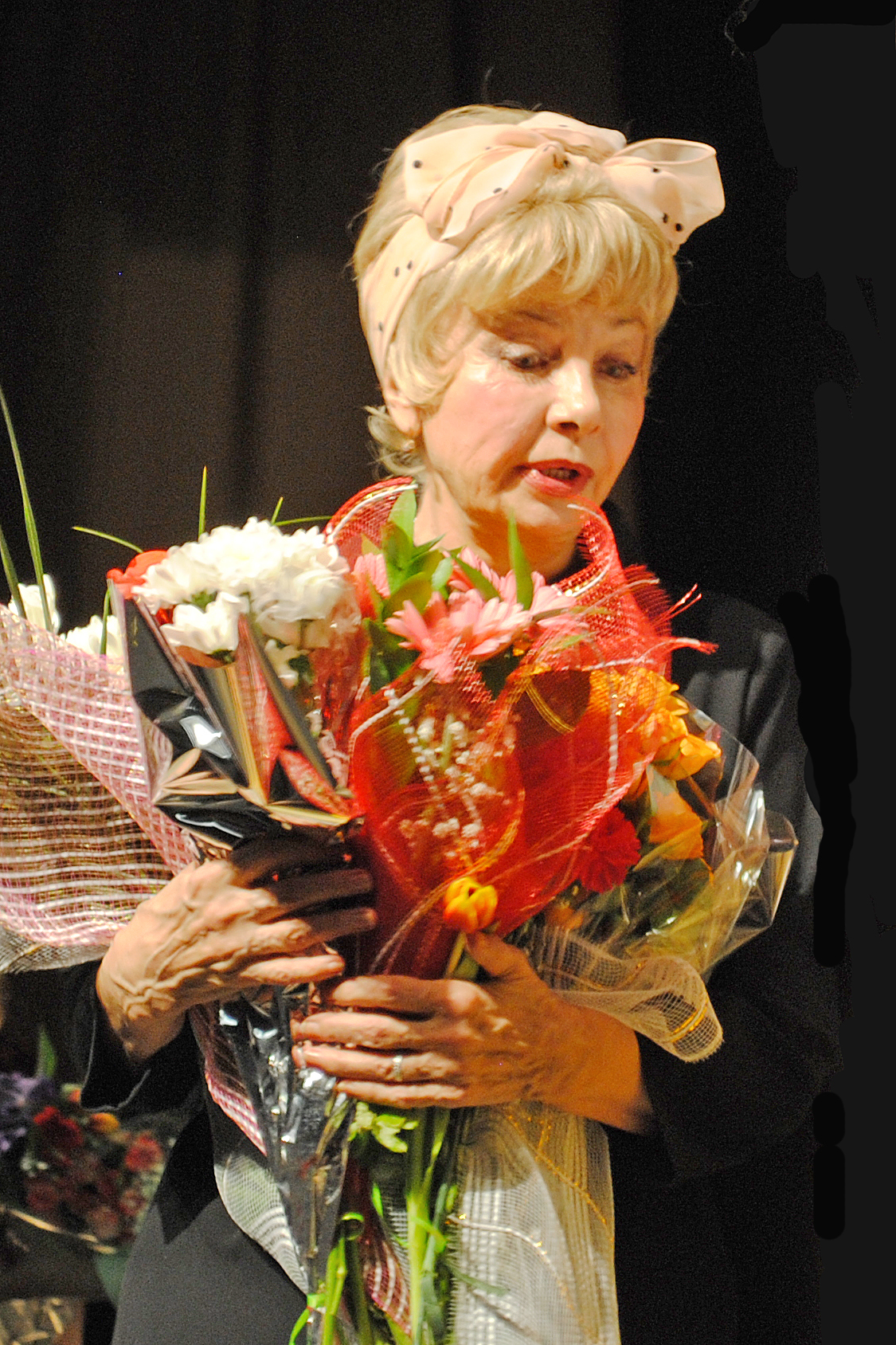
Sharykina in 2015

Valentina Dmitrievna Sharykina (Russian: Валенти́на Дми́триевна Шары́кина; 25 February 1940 – 23 November 2025) was a Soviet and Russian stage and film actress. People's Artist of Russia (2000).

Sharykina was born in Kyiv, Ukrainian SSR, Soviet Union on 25 February 1940. In the 1970s, she was in a de facto marriage with film director Yevgeny Tashkov. Sharykina died on 23 November 2025, at the age of 85.

== Selected filmography ==
- The Third Half (1962) as Vera
- Flying Days (1966) as Fyodor Ivanovich's wife
- Older Sister (1966) as Shura
- July Rain (1966) as Lyusya
- Major Whirlwind (1967) as girl dancing at the restaurant
- Yegor Bulychyov and Others (1971) as Elizaveta
- Ruslan and Lyudmila (1972) as episode
- Privalov's Millions (1972) as actress Kolpakova
- Vanyushin's Children (1973) as Lyudmila Krasavina
- Down House (2001) as general's wife Ivolgina
- Long Farewell (2004) as Lyalya in old
- Voronin's Family (TV series, 2010) as Tatyana Alekseevna
- Yeltsin: Three Days in August (2011) as Emma Yazova
- Happy Together (TV series, 2012) as Iraida
