= The Garage (1980 film) =

- USSR film poster
- Russian: Гараж
- Directed by: Eldar Ryazanov
- Screenplay by: Emil Braginsky; Eldar Ryazanov
- Starring: Liya Akhedzhakova; Iya Savvina; Svetlana Nemolyaeva; Valentin Gaft; Andrey Myagkov; Georgi Burkov
- Cinematography: Vladimir Nakhabtsev
- Music by: Andrei Petrov
- Production company: Mosfilm
- Release date: 10 March 1980
- Running time: 96 min
- Country: Soviet Union
- Language: Russian

The Garage (Russian: Гараж) is a Soviet 1980 comedy-drama film directed by Eldar Ryazanov, based on a screenplay by Emil Braginsky.

In the 1970s Soviet Union, a group of garage cooperative members confront corruption, favoritism, and moral dilemmas in a tense, locked-room meeting that spirals into an unexpected battle of ethics and power.

== Plot summary ==
Set in the Soviet Union in the late 1970s, the story unfolds in the fictional "Research Institute for the Protection of Animals from the Environment," specifically within a zoological museum, where members of the garage construction cooperative "Fauna," founded by the institute's employees, are gathered. The cooperative’s leadership, including chairperson Valentin Sidorin, vice director Lydia Anikeeva, and accountant Alla Petrovna, announces that part of their planned garage area will be affected by a new highway, meaning they need to reduce the number of available garages. They present a pre-approved list of four people who are to be cut, but several members, especially those most vulnerable, protest the decision and demand a fairer selection process.

As tensions rise, junior researcher Elena Malaeva, sympathizing with the excluded members, locks the doors, forcing the cooperative to continue the meeting and hear her out. She reveals inconsistencies in the selection process, highlighting favoritism and corruption, as some slots had secretly gone to influential figures such as a market director and the son of a high-ranking official. This exposes a deeper struggle within the cooperative, leading to arguments, accusations, and near violence. Finally, after several failed attempts to reach a resolution, including a suggestion to draw lots, the assembly is interrupted by Anikeeva's husband, who announces their car has been stolen, disqualifying her from membership. This turn allows the cooperative to reallocate her garage spot and leads to the exclusion of the corrupt members, though not without further contention. In a closing twist, the final spot is decided by a lot, only to reveal that one of the committee members slept through the entire meeting and missed his turn, providing a moment of irony as the chaotic gathering draws to an end.

== Cast ==
- Liya Akhedzhakova as Malayeva
- Iya Savvina as Anikeyeva
- Svetlana Nemolyaeva as Guskov's Wife
- Valentin Gaft as Sidorin, Head of Cooperative
- Andrey Myagkov as Khvostov
- Georgi Burkov as Vitaly Fetisov
- Leonid Markov as Professor Smirnovsky
- Vyacheslav Nevinny as Karpukhin
- Anastasia Voznesenskaya as Market Director
- Semyon Farada as Trombone Player
- Igor Kostolevsky as Miloserdov's Son
- Olga Ostroumova as Marina
- Gleb Strizhenov as Yakubov
- Boryslav Brondukov as The Groom
- Natalya Gurzo as Natasha

== Production ==
Director Eldar Ryazanov got the idea for the movie after a meeting for the parking garage co-operative of Mosfilm employees. The director expected the meeting to last only 30 minutes, but it instead lasted the whole day. He returned in a state of shock because of the way that the artists, including those with reputations as decent and intelligent people, behaved when they learned that some of them would have to give up their parking spots. Even members whose names were famous – not only in the country but also worldwide – resorted to insults and verbal attacks to defend their parking spots. Afterwards, Ryazanov felt guilty because he did not stand up for those who lost their parking spots.

His alter ego in the film is Professor Smirnovsky, who sees the injustice of what is happening but does nothing about it.

As in all his movies, Eldar Ryazanov acted in a minor role: he played the head of the insect department who overslept the whole meeting and drew the unfortunate lot at the end of the film.

== Release ==
The Garage premiered in the Soviet Union on 10 March 1980.
