= The Shadow Near the Pier =

- Russian: Тень у пирса
- Directed by: Mikhail Vinyarsky
- Starring: Oleg Zhakov; Raisa Matyushkina; Oleg Tumanov; Ekaterina Savinova; Vladimir Balashov; Viktor Kulakov
- Cinematography: Mikhail Karyukov; Vasili Simbirtsev
- Music by: Klimenty Korchmaryov
- Production company: Odessa Film Studio
- Release date: 1955
- Running time: 88 min.
- Country: Soviet Union
- Language: Russian

The Shadow Near the Pier (Russian: Тень у пирса, romanized: Ten u pirsa) is a 1955 Soviet mystery drama film directed by Mikhail Vinyarsky.

== Plot ==
In a seaside city, a saboteur with a plan of a floating dock, ready for towing to a remote port, is detained. Major Lyudov of the Ministry of State Security is tasked with uncovering connections between the detainee and a group of saboteurs operating in the city and ensure the timely dispatch of the dock.

== Cast ==
- Oleg Zhakov as Major Lyudov
- Raisa Matyushkina as Tatyana Rakitina
- Oleg Tumanov as Sergey Ageyev
- Ekaterina Savinova as waitress Klava Shubina
- Vladimir Balashov as Kobchikov
- Viktor Kulakov as Semyon
- Lev Olevsky as Colonel Rysley

== Release ==
In a list of the highest-grossing films of the USSR, this film takes 400th place with 29.4 million spectators.
