= Crime and Punishment (2024 TV series) =

- Преступление и наказание
- Genre: Psychological thriller Crime; Drama
- Based on: Crime and Punishment by Fyodor Dostoevsky
- Written by: Anastasiya Mirzoyeva
- Directed by: Vladimir Mirzoyev
- Starring: Ivan Yankovsky; Alyona Mikhaylova; Tikhon Zhiznevsky; Lyubov Aksyonova; Yuliya Snigir
- Country of origin: Russia
- Original language: Russian
- No. of seasons: 1
- No. of episodes: 10

Production
- Executive producer: Murad Omarov
- Producers: Vladimir Maslov; Olga Filipuk; Mikhail Kitaev; Asya Gladkovskaya
- Running time: 52 minutes
- Production company: ZOOM Production

Original release
- Network: Kinopoisk
- Release: 2 November – 30 November 2024

Crime and Punishment (Russian: Преступление и наказание, romanized: Prestuplenie i nakazanie) is a Russian TV series adaptation of the Crime and Punishment by Fyodor Dostoevsky, broadcast on Kinopoisk streaming service in November 2024.

The premiere of the first four episodes was initially scheduled for release on Kinopoisk on October 26, 2024. However, it was first postponed to October 27, then delayed further to October 29, before being indefinitely postponed. The first four episodes were ultimately released on November 2, 2024. The remaining six episodes were made available on the platform on November 30.

== Plot ==
The story is set in modern-day Saint Petersburg, Russia. Rodion Raskolnikov, a destitute and unemployed student, is tormented by poverty and existential despair. Gradually, he becomes convinced that certain individuals possess the moral right to commit heinous acts if they serve a greater purpose—advancing human progress through extraordinary discoveries. Determined to test this theory, he murders Alyona Ivanovna, an elderly microcredit lender. Investigator Porfiry Petrovich takes on the case, seeking to extract a full confession from Raskolnikov through psychological confrontation.

== Cast ==
- Ivan Yankovsky as Rodion Raskolnikov
- Alyona Mikhaylova as Sonya Marmeladova
- Tikhon Zhiznevsky as Dmitry Razumikhin, Rodion's friend
- Lyubov Aksyonova as Dunya Raskolnikova, sister to Rodion
- Yuliya Snigir as Marfa Svidrigailova
- Vladislav Abashin as Arkady Svidrigailov
- Nikita Tarasov as Pyotr Luzhin
- Viktoriya Tolstoganova as Katerina Marmeladova
- Boris Khvoshnyansky as the Shadow
- Vladimir Mishukov as Porfiry Petrovich, the investigator
- Oleg Dulenin as Semyon Marmeladov
- Yola Sanko as Alyona Ivanovna, the elderly microcredit lender
- Yekaterina Yefimova as Lizaveta Ivanovna
- Yuliya Marchenko as Pulkheria Raskolnikova, mother to Rodion
- Maria Smolnikova as Pashenka, Raskolnikov's landlady
- Dmitry Miller as False-Svidrigailov

== Production and release ==
In February 2022, it was announced that filmmaker Vladimir Mirzoyev would adapt Fyodor Dostoevsky's novel Crime and Punishment into a television series, transposing its setting to modern-day Saint Petersburg. Mirzoyev promised "a fresh perspective on one of the most significant works of Russian literature." According to the director, the narrative would focus primarily on the characters of Rodion Raskolnikov and his sister Dunya.

By December 2023, filming had been completed.

The series premiered on November 2, 2024, with the release of its first four episodes; the remaining six were scheduled for late November.

On November 7, 2024, it was revealed that the series would be distributed internationally under the title Crime & Punishment. The production company is preparing English, French, and Spanish-language adaptations for release in foreign markets.
