= Sashka (film) =

- Russian: Сашка
- Directed by: Aleksandr Surin
- Written by: Vyacheslav Kondratyev
- Starring: Andrey Tashkov; Marina Yakovleva; Vladimir Simonov; Yuri Veyalis; Leonid Yarmolnik
- Cinematography: Yuriy Nevskiy
- Music by: Vitaliy Geviksman
- Release date: 1981
- Running time: 90 minute
- Country: Soviet Union
- Language: Russian

Sashka (Russian: Сашка) is a 1981 Soviet World War II film directed by Aleksandr Surin.

== Plot ==
The film takes place in 1942 near Rzhev, where military operations take place. The film tells about the village couple Sashka, who leads an unequal battle with the enemy.

== Cast ==
- Andrey Tashkov as Sashka
- Marina Yakovleva as Zina
- Vladimir Simonov as Lieutenant Volodka
- Yuri Veyalis as Zhora
- Leonid Yarmolnik as Kurt
- Yuri Grebenshchikov as Battalion Commander
- Vyacheslav Molokov as Orderly Tolik
- Mikhail Shuleykin as Company Commander (as Mikhail Krylov)
- Elena Antonenko as Lyuba
- Nartay Begalin
