= Vladimir Simonov (actor) =

Soviet and Russian actor (1957–2025)

- Владимир Симонов
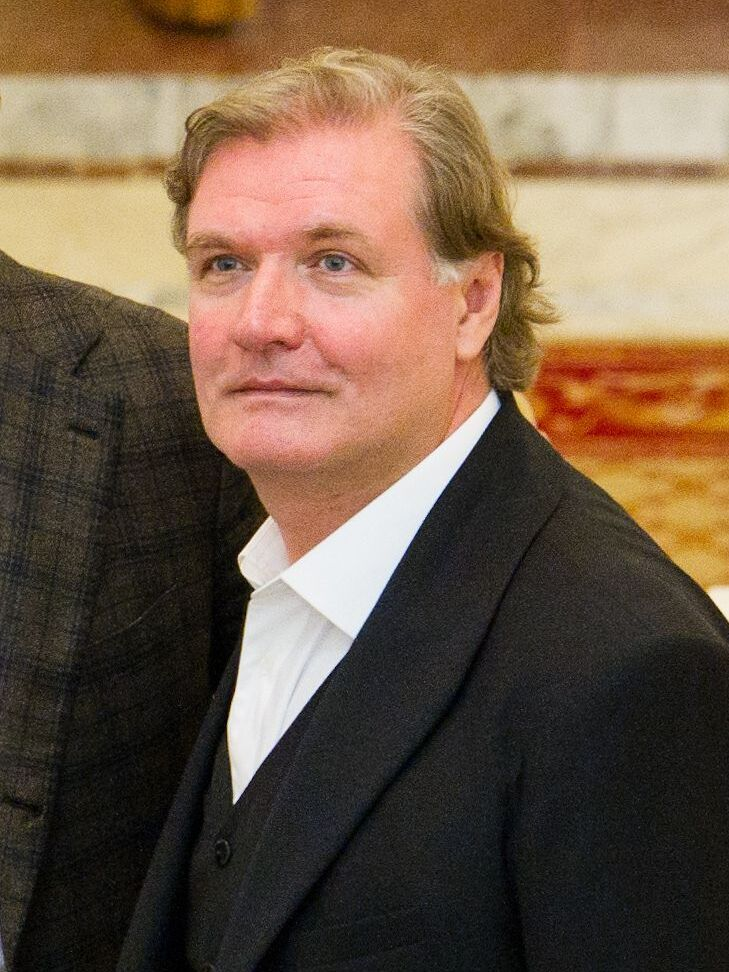
- Simonov in 2012
- Born: Vladimir Alexandrovich Simonov; 7 June 1957; Oktyabrsk, Kuybyshevskaya Oblast, Russian SFSR, USSR
- Died: 8 November 2025 (aged 68)
- Occupation: Actor
- Years active: 1979–2025

Vladimir Alexandrovich Simonov (Russian: Владимир Александрович Симонов; 7 June 1957 – 8 November 2025) was a Soviet and Russian actor of stage and screen.

== Early life and education ==
Vladimir Alexandrovich Simonov was born on 7 June 1957 in Oktyabrsk (then in the USSR).

He graduated from the Boris Shchukin Theatre Institute (Alla Kazanskaya’s course) in 1980.

== Career ==
Simonov appeared in many stage productions, and more than 100 films.

After graduating, he joined the Vakhtangov Theatrecompany. From 1983 until 1987, he worked at the Moscow Art Theatre, appearing in leading and supporting roles, before returning to Vakhtangov.

He worked with many well-known stage and film directors.

== Death ==
Simonov died from a cardiac arrest on 8 November 2025, at the age of 68.

== Recognition and awards ==
Simonov was honoured as a People's Artist of the Russian Federation in 2001.

In 2012, he was awarded the Mayor of Moscow prize for literature and the performing arts.

He was awarded the theatre prize Crystal Turandot in 2016.

== Selected filmography ==
Year	Title	Role	Notes
1981	Sashka	Lieutenant Volodka	
1984	Offered for Singles	Mitya	
1988	Criminal Talent	Kaplichenkov	
2000	The Wedding	Vasily Borodin	
2004	Children of the Arbat	Budyagin	
2006	Bramble, During the Summer	Rodion Viktorovich	
2011	Samara		
2012	Rzhevsky Versus Napoleon	Mikhail Kutuzov	
2014	Kitchen	Gennady Sokolov	
2015	Dukhless 2	Varennikov	
2015	The Land of Oz	Bard	
2016	The Queen of Spades	Golovin	
2018	House Arrest	Eduard Kargopolov	
2020	Psycho	Nikolay Stepanovich	
2021	A Dog Named Palma	Ivan Lysko	
2022	Mira	old man	
