= Come Tomorrow, Please... =

- Directed by: Yevgeny Tashkov
- Written by: Yevgeny Tashkov
- Produced by: Serafima Beniova
- Starring: Ekaterina Savinova; Anatoli Papanov
- Cinematography: Radomir Vasilevsky
- Edited by: Valentina Oleynik
- Music by: Andrei Eshpai
- Production company: Odessa Film Studio
- Release date: 1963
- Running time: 98 minutes
- Country: Soviet Union
- Language: Russian

Come Tomorrow, Please... (Russian: Приходите завтра…, romanized: Prikhodite zavtra...) is a 1963 Soviet romantic musical comedy-drama film written and directed by Yevgeny Tashkov. The film was watched by 15.4 million viewers.

The film tells about the fate of Frosya, a simple, talented girl, who came to study in Moscow from a small Siberian village, about how she achieved success in the conservatory.

== Plot ==
Young woman Frosya Burlakova comes to Moscow from a remote Siberian village to enter the Gnessin State Musical College and become a singer. She stays at the place of sculptor Nikolai Vasilievich, who studied at a school in Zaporozhye, where their common acquaintance worked, a school manager, who then moved to Siberia. Absolutely unfamiliar with big city life, Frosya amuses Vasilyevich, his girlfriend Natasha and the housekeeper with her provinciality and spontaneity. However, the sincerity and spiritual purity of Frosya lead the sculptor to the idea that he himself has long been bogged down in lies, fuss and commercial work, exchanged his artistic talent for trifles and lost his creative path.

Frosya tries to enter the institute, but finds out that she was late and that the exams are already over. After spending several days at the institute, Frosya repeatedly encounters the famous and respected professor Sokolov, who finally agrees to listen to her sing. During the audition the professor discovers that the little-educated Siberian girl has outstanding singing talent, a fantastically strong voice, and is also endowed with an innate intelligence and a sense of beauty. He is trying to persuade the administration that Frosya should be admitted to the institute as an exception.

All this time, Vasilyevich in vain tries to find himself in art. The further he goes, the more he is convinced that all his previous work is just a forgery for art, and that the ideas are dead. On a sleepless night, realizing that a creative crisis has come, in despair, he destroys all the creations in his workshop, leaving only one, a work from college made during the third year, which he said was really made for people, as he states.

The next morning Frosya leaves the apartment of Nikolai Vasilyevich. By the efforts of Professor Sokolov, she still manages to be admitted to college and gets a place in the hostel. On the way there she meets a student, Kostya, who soon becomes her boyfriend. However, the relationship between young people does not mesh, because Kostya completely does not share nor understand Frosya's passion for music. And the girl herself when conversing with him does not try to understand his interests, but instead only continues to think about her studies.

Six months pass. During one of the lessons Burlakova's voice breaks and she has to interrupt the training for some time. In a tram she encounters Nikolai Vasilyevich. Both are very pleased with each other and in conversation Frosya finds out that the sculptor has changed a lot during this time, has rethought a lot about his life and seems to have found his own creative path.

After recovering, Burlakova returns to the institute and on the same day Kostya leaves Moscow for good. He informed Frosya about this using a note and the girl did not even have a chance to say goodbye to him and to get from him any explanation. Left alone, the future singer devotes herself entirely to study, because for her, the time of easy success has passed, and ahead, long and painstaking work is planned.

== Cast ==
- Ekaterina Savinova as Frosya Burlakova
- Anatoli Papanov as Nikolai Vasilyevich, sculptor (voiced by Yevgeny Tashkov)
- Yuri Gorobets as Kostya, student (voiced by Yuri Sarantsev)
- Nadezhda Zhivotova as Maria Semyonovna, housekeeper (voiced by Ekaterina Savinova)
- Alexander Schirvindt as Vadim ("Stanislavski"), student
- Yuri Belov as Volodya ("Nemirovich-Danchenko"), student
- Boris Bibikov as Alexander Alexanderovich Sokolov, professor
- Antonina Maximova as Natasha, Nikolai's bride
- Boris Kokovkin as Denis Ivanovich, institute director
- Zinaida Dyakonova as Veronika Vasilyevna, accompanist
- Alexandra Denisova as cloackroom attendant
- Yevgeny Tashkov as hard of hearing man in sunglasses
- Mikhail Kononov as bus passenger
- Anna Zarjitskaya as train passenger

== Awards ==
- 1964 All-Union Film Festival:
  - First and Second Prize for Best Actor (Anatoli Papanov)
  - First and Second Prize for Best Actress (Yekaterina Savinova)
