= Vladislav Strzhelchik =

Soviet and Russian actor (1921–1995)

- Владислав Стржельчик
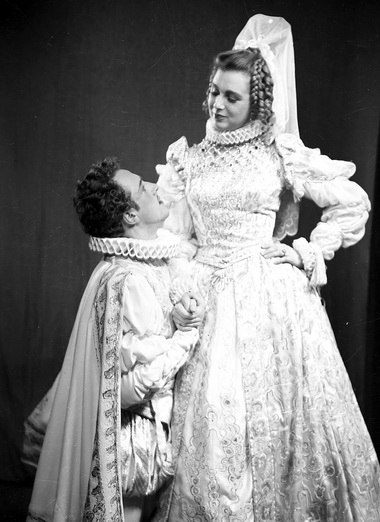
- Strzhelchik in 1949
- Born: Vladislav Ignatievich Strzhelchik; 31 January 1921; Petrograd, RSFSR
- Died: 11 September 1995 (aged 74); Saint Petersburg, Russia
- Resting place: Volkovo Cemetery, Saint Petersburg
- Occupations: actor; theatre teacher
- Years active: 1938–1993
- Spouse: Lyudmila Shuvalova
- Awards: People's Artist of the USSR (1974)

Vladislav Ignatievich Strzhelchik (Russian: Владисла́в Игна́тьевич Стрже́льчик; 1921–1995) was a Soviet and Russian actor. People's Artist of the USSR (1974).

== Biography ==
Vladislav Strzhelchik born in Petrograd (now Saint Petersburg, Russia). His father, Ignatiy Petrovich was a native of Poland (Polish: Ignacy Strzelczyk) who settled in St. Petersburg at the beginning of the 20th century.

In 1938 Vladislav Strzhelchik was accepted into the studio of the Gorky Bolshoi Drama Theater and in the same year he became an actor of this theater, where he worked all his life. He graduated from the studio only in 1947. During the Great Patriotic War, Vladislav Strzhelchik was drafted into the Red Army and served in the infantry at the forefront.

In 1959–1968 Strzhelchik lectured at the Leningrad Institute for Theatre, Music and Cinematography, since 1966 at the Leningrad Institute for Culture.

He died in Saint Petersburg on 11 September 1995, and was buried on the famous Literatorskie mostki ("Writer's footworks") of Volkovo Cemetery.

== Selected filmography ==
- Ivan Pavlov (Russian: Иван Павлов, 1949) as high-school student (uncredited)
- Resurrection (Воскресение, 1960–61) as Earl Shembok
- War and Peace (Война и мир, 1960–61) as Napoleon
- Major Whirlwind (Майор Вихрь, 1967) as Abwehr сolonel Berg
- Sofiya Perovskaya (Софья Перовская, 1967) as Alexander II of Russia / inquisitor
- Tchaikovsky (Чайковский, 1969) as Nikolai Rubinstein
- The Adjutant of His Excellency (Адъютант его превосходительства, 1969) as general Kovalevsky
- Liberation (Освобождение, 1970–71) as general Aleksei Antonov
- The Crown of the Russian Empire, or Once Again the Elusive Avengers (Корона Российской Империи, или Снова Неуловимые, 1971) as Naryshkin, a professional burglar
- Privalov's Millions (Приваловские миллионы, 1973) as Alexander Polovodov
- The Straw Hat (Соломенная шляпка, 1974) as Antoine Petitpierre Nonancourt
- The Captivating Star of Happiness (Звезда пленительного счастья, 1975) as Count Ivan Laval
- Father Sergius (Отец Сергий, 1978) as Nicholas I
- Khanuma (Ханума, 1978) as Prince Vano Pantiashvili
- Treasure Island (Остров сокровищ, 1982) as Squire Trelawney
- Time for Rest from Saturday to Monday (Время отдыха с субботы до понедельника, 1984) as Aleksey
- Gardes-Marines, Ahead! (Гардемарины, вперёд!, 1988) as Jean Armand de Lestocq

== Honors ==
- Honored Artist of the RSFSR (1954)
- People's Artist of the RSFSR (1965)
- People's Artist of the USSR (October 4, 1974)
- Hero of Socialist Labour (1988)
