= Thirst (1959 film) =

- Russian: Жажда
- Directed by: Yevgeny Tashkov
- Written by: Grigori Pozhenyan
- Starring: Vyacheslav Tikhonov; Valentina Khmara; Yuri Belov; Anton Dotsenko; Vladimir Ivanov
- Cinematography: Pyotr Todorovskiy
- Edited by: T. Dokh
- Music by: Andrei Eshpai
- Release date: 1959
- Country: Soviet Union
- Language: Russian

Thirst (Russian: Жажда) is a 1959 Soviet World War II film directed by Yevgeny Tashkov.

== Plot ==
The film takes place in Odessa, besieged by the Nazis. They captured the village with the water station and, as result, the residents of Odessa were left without water. A scout named Maria goes behind enemy lines hoping to contact the workers of the water station, but the company does not receive any messages from her and decides to send the sailor Bezborodko, who speaks German very well. The squad goes after him...

== Cast ==
- Vyacheslav Tikhonov as Oleg Bezborodko leytenant
- Valentina Khmara as Masha (as V. Khmara)
- Yuri Belov as Vasya Rogozin 'Patefon' (as Yu. Byelov)
- Anton Dotsenko as Nikita Nechipaylo (as A. Datsenko)
- Vladimir Ivanov as Tvyordokhlebov (as V. Ivanov)
- Nikolai Timofeyev as Nikitin, polkovnik (as N. Timofeyev)
- Boris Bityukov as Alekseyenko, kapitan-leytenant (as B. Bityukov)
- B. Goduntsov
- Vasili Vekshin as Kalina (as V. Vekshin)
- Mullayan Suyargulov as Mamed (as M. Suyargulov)
- Oleg Golubitsky as Kurt Lemke (as O. Golubitskiy)
