= Agnia Ditkovskyte =

Lithuanian and Russian actress

Agnia Ditkovskite
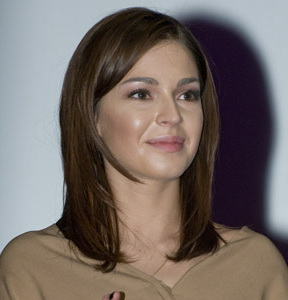
- Ditkovskite at the premiere of Hooked in Moscow, 2009
- Born: Agne Olegovna Ditkovskite; 11 May 1988 (age 38); Vilnius, Lithuanian SSR, USSR
- Citizenship: Russian
- Occupations: Actress, TV presenter
- Years active: 2006–present

Agnia (Agne) Olegovna Ditkovskyte (Lithuanian: Agnija (Agnė) Ditkovskytė), after marriage — Chadova, born 11 May 1988, Vilnius, Lithuania) is a Russian actress of a Lithuanian origin.

== Biography ==
Ditkovskyte was born into the family of Lithuanian director Olegas Ditkovskis and Russian actress Tatyana Lyutaeva. She lived in Lithuania until the age of 15, then in 2004 she moved to Moscow with her mother and younger brother Dominique.

Ditkovskyte decided to follow in her parents' footsteps and enrolled at VGIK. However, she only spent a single year at university. Despite this, Ditkovskyte was able to start a professional career and debuted in feature film Heat, in which she played a major role.

In 2006, Ditkovskyte stopped acting for a while, but in 2008 she again started appearing on the screen and continues to pursue an acting career to this day.

== Personal life ==
From 2006 to 2009, Ditkovskyte dated Russian actor, Aleksey Chadov, whom she met on the set of the film Heat, after which their relationship began.

Ditkovskyte and Chadov both acted in the film Love in the Big City. Initially their relationship was happy, but later began to disintegrate and Ditkovskyte initiated their separation.

Later it became known that they had decided to resume their relationship. On 24 August 2012 they got married. On 5 June 2014 Ditkovskyte gave birth to their son Fedor. On 2 May 2015 the actors broke up again.

On April 16, 2017, the actress gave birth to her second child, — daughter Nika.

In the summer of 2021, she married businessman Bogdan Panchenko. On November 3, 2021, she became a mother for the third time, as reported on her Instagram.

== Filmography ==
- 2006 — Heat
- 2006 — Ivan Podushkin. Gentleman Detective
- 2006 — Death Bequest
- 2008 — Mountaineer
- 2009 — Hooked on the Game
- 2010 — Hooked 2. Next Level
- 2011 — Boris Godunov
- 2011 — Tadas Blinda (The Beginning)
- 2012 — Happy New Year, Mommies!
- 2013 — Lucky Island
- 2013 — A Toy Seller
- 2014 — Viy
- 2014 — Major Sokolov's Hetaeras
- 2017 — Dance to Death
- 2021 — An Hour Before the Dawn
