= Major Whirlwind =

- Written by: Yulian Semyonov
- Directed by: Yevgeny Tashkov
- Starring: Vadim Beroev; Anastasia Voznesenskaya; Vladislav Strzhelchik; Victor Pavlov; Alexander Schirvindt
- Music by: Andrei Eshpai
- Country of origin: Soviet Union
- Original language: Russian

Production
- Producer: Gennady Abramov
- Cinematography: Pyotr Terpsikhorov
- Running time: 216 min.
- Production company: Mosfilm

Original release
- Release: 1967

Major Whirlwind or (Russian: Майор Вихрь, romanized: Mayor Vikhr) is a 1967 television film directed by Yevgeny Tashkov and based on the novel by Yulian Semyonov. The main character, Major Whirlwind, is inspired by Aleksey Nikolayevich Botyan.

== Plot ==
Summer 1944. In impotent rage before impending disaster, management of the SS with the support of Hitler undertakes a special program of extermination of Slavic cultural capitals. Kraków, Bratislava, Prague all these cities must be mined and razed to the ground with explosions. The Soviet command sends a special group of Major Whirlwind into occupied Kraków, consisting of three people, whose aim is to prevent the destruction of the city. The release of the group is unsuccessful, Whirlwind gets shipped to the Gestapo, but later he manages to escape.

Agents start to take action. The Polish underground collects valuable information about the German troops in Kraków, and radio operator Anya transmits them to the Soviet command. However, during one of radio transmissions, location of the transmitter is traced, and Anya is arrested by the Abwehr. Abwehr Colonel Berg in conjunction with the Gestapo holds an operation for recruiting Anya for the subsequent radio play. He tells the radio operator that supposedly he is ready to cooperate with the Soviet intelligence and pass important information on to them. Berg manages to convince Anya and she even sends coded disinformation prepared by the Gestapo. However, after the arrest of his chief Admiral Canaris in connection with the 20 July plot, Colonel Berg decides to establish genuine contact with the Soviet intelligence. He meets with Whirlwind and organizes Anya's escape.

With Berg's group, Whirlwind gets information about the specific organizers of the Kraków explosion. Attempting to influence the Chief Executive of the act, SS officer Libo, is a failure. However, Whirlwind manages to capture engineer Krauch, who when saving his own life, draws a diagram of the Kraków explosion network. In the last hours before the destruction of the city, Whirlwind and the Polish underground find the main cable, blow it up and fiercely defend the place of the explosion. Brave heroes die, German soldiers are already prepared to repair the damaged cable, but Soviet tanks are not far away and the Nazis flee.

== Cast ==
- Vadim Beroev as Major Whirlwind
- Anastasia Voznesenskaya as Anya, radio operator
- Viktor Pavlov as Kolya, Whirlwind's deputy
- Alexander Schirvindt as Jozef, Polish underground fighter
- Yevgeny Teterin as Sedoi, Polish underground fighter
- Lyudmila Davydova as Krysya, Polish underground fighter
- Igor Yasulovich as Kurt Appel, German soldier-driver, Krysya's groom
- Yevgeni Burenkov as Borodin, soviet intelligence colonel
- Yuri Volyntsev as Hugo Shwalb, Gestapo officer
- Vladimir Kenigson as Traub, German military journalist
- Vladislav Strzhelchik as Berg, Abwehr colonel
- Yevgeniy Kuznetsov as Friedrich-Wilhelm Krüger, SD chief of Kraków
- Vladimir Gusev as Mukha, traitor
- Oleg Golubitsky as interpreter
- Georgi Shevtsov as Stromberg, Wehrmacht major
- Konstantin Zheldin as Gestapo officer, Kolya's who questioned
- Boris Bibikov as Neubutt, Wehrmacht colonel-general
- Vladimir Osenev as Krauch, German colonel-engineer
- Peeter Kard as Gustav Libo, SS Obersturmbannführer
- Vladimir Pitsek as hairdresser
- Sergei Golovanov as Birghoff, Wehrmacht officer
- Valentin Golubenko as Gestapo officer
- Valentina Sharykina as girl dancing at the restaurant
- Aleksandra Denisova as old Polish woman
- Alevtina Rumyantseva as waitress
- Victor Filippov as Polish partisan

== See also ==
- Seventeen Moments of Spring
