= The Man Who Knew Everything =

- Film poster
- Directed by: Vladimir Mirzoyev
- Written by: Vladimir Mirzoyev; Igor Sakhnovsky
- Produced by: Oleg Osipov; Timur Weinstein
- Starring: Egor Beroev; Ekaterina Guseva; Maksim Sukhanov
- Cinematography: Sergei Machilsky
- Edited by: Igor Litoninsky
- Music by: Nikolay Anokhin; Sergei Belyaev; Yuri Dementyev,
- Production companies: Lean M U-Film Malta
- Distributed by: Central Partnership
- Release date: June 11, 2009
- Running time: 106 minutes
- Country: Russia
- Language: Russian

The Man Who Knew Everything (Russian: Человек, который знал всё, romanized: Chelovek, kotorij znal vsyo) is a 2009 Russian film directed by Vladimir Mirzoyev on the same name novel by Igor Sakhnovsky.

== Plot ==
Alexander Bezukdalnikov, as a result of a suicide attempt, suddenly finds the phenomenal ability to instantly get an answer to any question. Modest and harmless, he becomes a good game for all — women, criminal authorities and even international intelligence services. Some try to use it, others destroy it. But the little man continues to live according to the laws of his own conscience.

== Cast ==
- Egor Beroev as Alexander Bezukladnikov
- Ekaterina Guseva as Irina
- Yegor Pazenko as Sergey Nemchenko
- Tatyana Lyutaeva as Raisa Alekseevna
- Maksim Sukhanov as Nikolay Shimkevich
- Olga Lysak as Anzhela
- Andrey Tashkov as Valery Dmitrievich Stefanov

== Awards and nominations ==
- Nika Award (2009):
  - Best Supporting Actor — Maksim Sukhanov (win)
  - Best Cinematographer — Sergei Machilsky (nom)
