= Bramble, During the Summer =

- КостяНика. Время лета
- Directed by: Dmitry Fyodorov
- Written by: Lev Deltsov
- Produced by: Vitaly Sidorenko; Timur Abdullaev
- Starring: Ivan Vakulenko; Olga Starchenkova; Lyubov Germanova; Vladimir Simonov; Anna Gulyarenko
- Cinematography: Ivan Gudkov
- Music by: Andrey Doynikov
- Production company: Rakurs Film Company
- Release date: 2006
- Running time: 96 minutes
- Country: Russia
- Language: Russian

Bramble, During the Summer (Russian: Костяника. Время лета, romanized: KostyaNika. Vremya leta) is a Russian film produced in 2006. It was based on the novel "Kostya nickname The Tale" by the well-known children's writer Tamara Kryukova, who is writing fiction for teenagers.

== Plot ==
Set in the mid-1990s, the film unfolds in a lively summer community near Moscow, where high school students gather each year to enjoy carefree days and long nights. Amidst this youthful energy, a profound love unexpectedly blossoms between 15-year-old Nika, the daughter of a famous artist, and 16-year-old Kostya. Played by Ivan Vakulenko, a student at the Mikhail Shchepkin Higher Theatre School, Kostya is a modern-day Don Quixote — clad in torn jeans and a stretched-out T-shirt, yet possessing a pure heart. He becomes captivated by Nika, who, despite her luxurious home, leads a lonely life as a young girl with a disability. With her father (Vladimir Simonov) often preoccupied with his personal affairs and a strict governess, Polina (Lyubov Germanova), taking charge of her upbringing, Nika endures a strained and hostile relationship with her caretaker. For nine years, she and Polina have waged a "cold war" over who truly commands the household — Nika, as its rightful heir, or Polina, as her servant and guardian.

Kostya’s entrance into Nika’s life ignites a transformation, giving her a new sense of companionship and purpose. He encourages her to try sports, gifts her an adorable puppy, and even wheels her into the forest on a garden cart, feeding her wild blueberries. Their relationship faces numerous challenges, from youthful idealism to generational clashes and internal conflicts, as well as jealousy, minor quarrels that feel like monumental crises, and the heartache of first separation.

== Cast ==
- Olga Starchenkova as Nika
- Ivan Vakulenko as Kostya
- Lyubov Germanova as Polina
- Vladimir Simonov as Rodion Viktorovich, Nika's father
- Anna Churina as Anastasia
- Anna Gulyarenko as Kostya's mother
- Anna Zdor as Verka

== Crew ==
- Director: Dmitry Fyodorov
- Written by: Lev Deltsov
- Сinematographer: Ivan Gudkov
- Production designer: Oleg Kramorenko
- Composer: Andrey Doynikov
- Produced by: Vitaly Sidorenko, Timur Abdullaev

== Awards ==
- 2006: Grand Prix at the XIV International Children's Film Festival Artek
- 2006: The Prize for best costumes to the film at the XIV International Children's Film Festival Artek
- 2006: Grand Prix at the X All-Russia festival Eaglet or Orlenok
- 2006: Grand Prix at the I Moscow Open Festival of Youth Cinema Reflection or Otrajene
- 2006: Grand Prix at the VI International Children's Festival of Arts Kinotavrik in Sochi
- 2006: Audience Award for Best Russian Film at the Pacific Meridian International Film Festival in Vladivostok
- 2007: Award for contribution to the revival of spiritual and moral foundations of family, traditional Russian foundations at the II International Sretensky Orthodox Festival Meeting in Obninsk

== Literature ==
- Александра Иванова (2005-07-14). "Девушка из предместья «Костяника. Время лета» Дмитрия Федорова" (PDF). Культура (еженедельная газета интеллигенции). p. 9. Archived from the original (PDF) on 2024-12-06. (Культура)
