= Andrey Tashkov =

Andrey Tashkov HAR
- Born: Andrey Yevgenyevich Tashkov; July 30, 1957 (age 69); Moscow, Russian SFSR, Soviet Union
- Occupation: Actor
- Years active: 1973–present

Andrey Yevgenyevich Tashkov (Russian: Андре́й Евге́ньевич Ташко́в; born July 30, 1957, Moscow, RSFSR, USSR) is a Soviet and Russian film, theater and voice actor. Merited Artist of the Russian Federation (1994).

His parents are film director Yevgeny Tashkov and actress Ekaterina Savinova.

In 1973 he made his debut in the cinema. In 1978 graduated from Boris Shchukin Theatre Institute.

In October 2008, he signed an open letter in defense and support of the release of the lawyer of the oil company Yukos Svetlana Bakhmina.

== Selected filmography ==
- Life and Death of Ferdinand Luce (1976) as bellhop in hotel
- Newcomer (1977) as Aleksei
- Detective (1979) as police sergeant Yevgeny Kulik
- Sashka (1981) as Sashka
- Teenager (1983) as Arkadiy Dolgorukiy
- Lawyer (1990) as Pavel Arkadyevich Beshmetyev
- White King, Red Queen (1992) as Nikolay Tyurin
- Flash.ka (2006) as Alexey
- Wedding Ring (2008) as Chameleon
- The Man Who Knew Everything (2009) as Valery Dmitrievich Stefanov
- Boris Godunov (2011) as Patriarch Job of Moscow
- Raid (2017) as Anton Borodin
- Doctor Lisa (2020) as pharmacist
