= Heat (2006 film) =

- Russian release poster
- Directed by: Rezo Gigineishvili
- Written by: Rezo Gigineishvili
- Produced by: Fyodor Bondarchuk; Alexander Rodnyansky; Dmitry Rudovsky
- Starring: Aleksey Chadov; Artur Smolyaninov; Konstantin Kryukov; Timur Yunusov; Agnia Ditkovskite; Olga Bolbukh; Mikhail Porechenkov
- Cinematography: Maksim Osadchy
- Edited by: Igor Litoninsky
- Music by: Dato Evgenidze
- Distributed by: Art Pictures Studio; Channel STS
- Release date: 28 December 2006
- Running time: 95 min.
- Country: Russia
- Language: Russian
- Budget: US$5,550,000
- Box office: US$15,710,000 (Russia)

Heat (Russian: Жара, stylized as "ЖАRА" (Note: Replacement of the Cyrillic letter Р to the Latin R was an advertising course, confirmed by Rezo Gigineishvili.)) is a 2006 Russian teen romantic comedy loosely based on the Walking the Streets of Moscow, directed by Rezo Gigineishvili and produced by Fyodor Bondarchuk. The story centers on a group of friends and their misadventures in Moscow during a summer heat wave. Heat along with Wolfhound became one of the most expensive Russian films in 2006. Additionally, its budget was one third as compared to the advertising campaign.

== Plot ==
After three years serving as a sailor in the Russian Navy, Aleksey (Aleksey Chadov) is discharged from the Black Sea Fleet and returns to Moscow to reunite with his girlfriend, only to discover that she has a child with another boyfriend. Dejected, he decides to have lunch at a restaurant with his best friends from high school. They are spoiled rich-kid Kostya (Konstantin Kryukov), who has a falling-out with his father; aspiring actor Artur (Artur Smolyaninov); and hip-hop artist Timati. As they finish lunch, the hosts refuse Kostya's American dollars as payment, and no one else can pay for the meal.

Timati offers to exchange some of the dollars for Russian rubles at a nearby currency exchange, but after finding out that it is closed, he is chased by a skinhead street gang. Timati hides in Kostya's flat and encounters Deni (Deni Dadaev), a con artist who swindles tourists, and who has organized an illegal house party at the flat. That night, Timati slips past the skinheads waiting outside by hiding in a suitcase and having a partygoer smuggle him away.

Artur is sent off when Timati goes missing, and he finds the same exchange to be closed. He then wanders onto a music video shoot where he is invited by the director (Fyodor Bondarchuk) to audition as an actor. Unfortunately, Artur boards the wrong bus and leaves with migrant workers to demolish the Rossiya Hotel, believing it is part of the shoot. Artur eventually realizes his mistake and leaves humiliated.

Kostya hands over his remaining dollars to Aleksey; he also finds the exchange is closed, and is then sidetracked after rescuing Nastya (Agnija Ditkovskytė), a beautiful and kind nightclub dancer who got hit by a taxi. The pair spend all night together in the city and slowly fall in love. Later, Aleksey gets into a drunken fight with Nastya's abusive ex-boyfriend, and Timati is arrested by the police after intervening. Aleksey spends the night at Nastya's apartment.

Meanwhile, Kostya attempts to chat up a pretty girl while waiting for his friends, but discovers that his phone has been stolen. Feeling abandoned, he throws a fit and is arrested by the police, languishing in jail for the rest of the night.

Artur finally exchanges the money and returns to the restaurant late at night; he finds everyone gone, and confides with the bartender. The next day, the four friends happily reunite at the police station, where Kostya and Timati are freed with the help of the police chief's daughter, who unwittingly photographed all their misadventures. After the friends part ways, Deni is arrested, Kostya reconciles with his father, while Aleksey and Nastya reunite and share a kiss.

== Cast ==
- Aleksey Chadov as Aleksey
- Artur Smolyaninov as Artur
- Konstantin Kryukov as Kostya
- Timati as Timati
- Anastasia Kochetkova as girl with camera
- Agnia Ditkovskyte as Nastya
- Dani Dadaev as Deni
- Maria Kurkova as Masha (Alexey's ex-girlfriend)
- Ptakha as husband of Masha
- Mikhail Vladimirov as manager of cafe
- Irina Rahmanova as waitress
- Igor Vernik as employee of the film studio
- Tigran Keosayan as flower seller
- Rezo Gigineishvili as director
- Fyodor Bondarchuk as director
- Tatyana Lyutaeva as Aleksey's mother

== Production ==
Gigineishvili and Bondarchuk used the same young cast and crew from The 9th Company for their film, set in Moscow during a hot boiling summer, which caused as the title Heat instead of the draft entitled "City Tales" ("Сказки города"). Its filming took place in the shortest time period: "the script was written in ten days; pre-production took no more than two weeks; and after four months of shooting, the movie was done."

== Reception ==
Despite the fiscal success, Heat took in $15 million in the CIS, and about $1 million in Ukraine, the film, mainly, received disapproving responses of critics for the commercial direction. According to the e-poll of Moskovskij Komsomolets, Heat was recognized as the worst Russian film of 2006.

- Alex Exler. "Heat (Zhara) review". Kinoman Magazine (in Russian).
- "Reinvigorating the most important art". RealTime Arts (81): 22. Oct–Nov 2007.
- Rynska, Bozhena (2006-12-26). Это была "Жара". Izvestia (in Russian). Archived from the original on 2008-09-04.
- Mikhailov, Igor (2006). "Heat review" (in Russian). Kinoafisha.ru.
- Sinyakov, Sergey (2006-12-25). Низ живота наполняется любовью (in Russian). Gazeta.ru.
- Korsakov, Denis (2006-12-22). Невыносимая "Жара". Komsomolskaya Pravda (in Russian).
- Pravda, Elena (2007-01-03). Жара: 10 друзей Бондарчука (in Russian). Kinokadr.ru.
- F. Rostotskiy, Stanislav (2007-11-27). Москва-УКВ (in Russian). Film.ru. Archived from the original on 2007-04-02.
- Filatov, Sergey (2007-01-11). ...пока горячо? (in Russian). Archived from the original on January 13, 2007.

=== Awards and nominations ===
Award	Subject	Nominee	Result
MTV Russia Movie Awards	Best Kiss	Aleksey Chadov and Agnija Ditkovskytė	Won
MTV Russia Movie Awards	Best Comedic Performance	Deni Dadaev	Nominated
MTV Russia Movie Awards	Best Movie		Nominated
MTV Russia Movie Awards	Best Female Performance	Agnija Ditkovskytė	Nominated
MTV Russia Movie Awards	Best Breakthrough Performance	Ptakha and Agnija Ditkovskytė	Nominated

== Censorship in Ukraine ==
During the Russo-Ukrainian War, the Boycott Russian Films activists demanded the Ukrainian Government to ban Russian films in Ukraine after the Donetsk Airport incident with Mikhail Porechenkov. On 31 November 2014, the State Agency of Ukraine for Cinema, on the proposal of the Ministry of Culture of Ukraine and the Security Service of Ukraine, forbidden to display 69 Russian films and TV series with Mikhail Porechenkov, including the film Heat.

== Soundtrack ==
ЖАRА: Soundtrack

Soundtrack album by various artists
- Released: February 2007
- Genres: Pop, R&B
- Length: 62:27
- Label: CD Land

Professional ratings
Review scores
Source	Rating
NEWSmusic	(3/10)

The original soundtrack was released in February 2007 and included a song of TOKiO, several tracks from Timati's new album Black Star and other musicians.

=== Track listing ===
1. "Когда ты плачешь" - TOKiO 4:15
2. "Летняя Москва" - Karina Koks 3:42
3. "Город ночных фонарей" - Timati & VIP77 3:21
4. "Жара" - Timati, F. Bondarchuk, NASTY 4:21
5. "В городской суете" - Basta 3:55
6. "Жара 77" - Centr 4:03
7. "Детка" - Timati 4:24
8. "Всё между нами" - Oleg Chubykin 4:14
9. "The Girl of funk" - DJ Smash 2:26
10. "Groovin" - VIP77 4:11
11. "Black star" - Timati 4:57
12. "Лето" - Lomonosov (band) 4:17
13. "Москва" - VIP77 3:33
14. "Жара" - DJ Smash 3:10
15. "Where you gonna be" - VIP77 4:15
16. "Happy New Year" - Siberia (band) 3:23
