= Vladimir Mirzoyev =

Russian film director (born 1957)

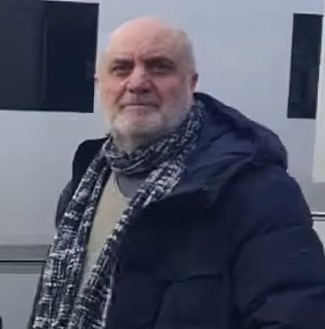
- Born: Vladimir Vladimirovich Mirzoyev; October 21, 1957 (age 69); Moscow, Soviet Union (now Russia)
- Occupations: Film director, set designer, pedagogue

Vladimir Vladimirovich Mirzoyev (Russian: Влади́мир Влади́мирович Мирзо́ев; born October 21, 1957) is a Soviet and Russian film director, set designer and teacher. Winner of State Prize of the Russian Federation.

== Biography ==
Vladimir was born on October 21, 1957. He studied at Russian Institute of Theatre Arts as a circus director. Since 1987 to 1989 he was the artistic director of the Domino Theater. In 1990 he founded the Horizontal Eight theater company in Toronto, then he staged various performances, taught and conducted master classes.

== Filmography (selected) ==
- The Man Who Knew Everything (2009)
- Boris Godunov (2011)
- How Nadya Went to Get Vodka (2020)
- Crime and Punishment (2024)
- A Killer's Mind (2024)

== Awards ==
- State Prize of the Russian Federation in the field of literature and arts (2002)
- National Award in the field of Web Industry in the category "Best Series Director" (2022)
