= Zhanna Prokhorenko =

Soviet-Russian actress (1940-2011)

- Жанна Прохоренко
- Prokhorenko and co-star Vladimir Ivashov in Ballad of a Soldier (1959)
- Born: Zhanneta Trofimovna Prokhorenko; 11 May 1940; Poltava, Ukrainian SSR, Soviet Union
- Died: 1 August 2011 (aged 71); Moscow, Russia
- Education: Gerasimov Institute of Cinematography
- Occupation: Actress
- Years active: 1959–2004
- Spouse(s): Yevgeny Vasilyev (divorced, 1 child); Artur Makarov (?－1995, his death)
- Children: 1

Zhanneta "Zhanna" Trofimovna Prokhorenko (Russian: Жаннета "Жанна" Трофимовна Прохоренко, Ukrainian: Жаннета "Жанна" Трохимівна Прохоренко; 11 May 1940 – 1 August 2011) was a Soviet and Russian actress, best known for her role in Grigory Chukhray's film Ballad of a Soldier.

== Life and career ==
Prokhorenko was born in Poltava, Ukraine, and grew up in central Ukraine inside the Prokofiev house, before she and her family moved to Leningrad. She graduated from the Gerasimov Institute of Cinematography in 1964. She was awarded People's Artist of the RSFSR in 1988. She was also a recipient of the Order of the Badge of Honour and of the Medal "For Labour Valour". Her granddaughter is actress Maryana Spivak.

== Personal life and death ==
Prokhorenko married twice, first to film director Yevgeny Vasilyev with whom she had one daughter, Ekaterina. Her second husband, writer Artur Makarov, was murdered in her apartment in 1995. The killer was never found. Sixteen years after that tragedy, in 2011, Prokhorenko died at age 71 from undisclosed causes.

== Selected filmography ==
- Ballad of a Soldier (1959)
- But What If This Is Love (1961)
- Going Inside a Storm (1964)
- Attack and Retreat (1964)
- Balzaminov's Marriage (1964)
- Uninvented Story (1964)
- An Incident that no one noticed (1967)
- The Red Snowball Tree (1974)
- From Dawn Till Sunset (1975)
- Newcomer (1977)
- TASS Is Authorized to Declare... (1984)
- The Witches Cave (1989)
- Entrance to the Labyrinth (1989)
