= Life Is Beautiful (1979 film) =

- Directed by: Grigory Chukhray
- Written by: Giovanni Fago; Augusto Caminito; Grigory Chukhray; Gianfranco Clerici
- Produced by: Lionello Santi
- Starring: Giancarlo Giannini; Ornella Muti; Stefano Madia; Enzo Fiermonte; Luigi Montini
- Cinematography: Mikhail Bits; Luigi Kuveiller
- Edited by: Mario Morra
- Music by: Armando Trovajoli
- Production companies: Mosfilm, Quattro Cavalli Cinematografica, RAI
- Distributed by: Variety Distribution
- Release date: December 21, 1979; Italy
- Running time: 101 minutes
- Countries: Italy; Soviet Union
- Languages: Russian; Italian

Life Is Beautiful (Italian: La vita è bella, Russian: Жизнь прекрасна, romanized: Zhizn prekrasna, also known as Betrayed) is a 1979 Italian-Soviet romantic drama directed by Grigory Chukhray.

== Plot ==
The action takes place in an unnamed country (in foreign versions of the film the country is Portugal during Salazar's reign), ruled by a military junta which violently suppresses any free thought. Antonio Murillo is a former military pilot who was dismissed from the army for refusing to sink a ship loaded with refugees. Now he drives a taxi and periodically becomes a witness to the despotism of the authorities. His girlfriend Mary, waitress, is a member of an underground movement fighting against the dictatorship. Antonio, for all his dislike of the junta is not interested in politics, his dream is to save money and to become a pilot again, and to own a private plane. But once he drives a man on his taxi, who turns out to be on the side of the opposition. This causes him to come to the attention of the special services. Because of that provocateur he ends up going to prison, where there are several members of the underground and ends up subjected to torture. Through ingenuity and mechanic skills he manages to save the life of underground fighters, disrupting the arranged provocation caused by the warden, and then organize an escape from prison. Together with Maria, Antonio in a stolen taxi gets away from the police, and then uses a hijacked plane to leave the country.

== Cast ==
- Giancarlo Giannini: Antonio Murillo
- Ornella Muti: Maria
- Stefano Madia: Paco
- Enzo Fiermonte: Maria's uncle
- Luigi Montini: episode
- Regimantas Adomaitis: investigator Perez (voiced by Vadim Spiridonov)
- Otar Koberidze: Alvarado (voiced by Vladimir Druzhnikov)
- Juozas Budraitis: Gomes
- Yevgeni Lebedev: Rostao
- Stanislav Chekan: prisoner
- Igor Yasulovich: prisoner
- Mikhail Remizov: Osario
