= Balzaminov's Marriage =

1964 film

- Directed by: Konstantin Voynov
- Written by: Alexander Ostrovsky (play); Konstantin Voynov
- Starring: Georgy Vitsin; Lyudmila Shagalova; Lidiya Smirnova; Ekaterina Savinova
- Music by: Boris Tchaikovsky
- Production company: Mosfilm
- Release date: 1964
- Running time: 90 minutes
- Country: Soviet Union
- Language: Russian

Balzaminov's Marriage (Russian: Женитьба Бальзаминова, romanized: Zhenitba Balzaminova) is a 1964 Soviet historical comedy-drama film directed by Konstantin Voynov and loosely based on three plays by Alexander Ostrovsky: "Celebratory Daydream is Only Before Dinner", "Two Dogs Fight, the Third Keeps Away" and "Whatever You Look for, You'll Find".

== Plot ==
The film is set in 19th-century Moscow and follows Mikhail Balzaminov, a petty clerk (played by Georgy Vitsin), and his overbearing mother (Ludmila Shagalova), who dream of securing a wealthy marriage. One morning, after interpreting a dream as a sign of impending marriage, Mikhail receives news from a matchmaker (Lidiya Smirnova) about a potential bride. Filled with visions of a prosperous future, he and his mother embark on a journey across Moscow to meet the Nichkin family. Along the way, Mikhail's mother teaches him rudimentary French words to bolster his appearance of sophistication. However, their visit ends in disaster when the bride's uncle (Nikolai Kryuchkov) rejects Mikhail, unwilling to see his family’s fortune wasted on what he deems an unworthy suitor.

Undeterred, Mikhail sets his sights on two wealthy women. His pursuit of a spirited young woman (Nadezhda Rumyantseva) fails, but he ultimately marries Domna Belotelova (Nonna Mordyukova), a domineering merchant with a vast fortune. Though Mikhail's new life may lack romance, his mother's final words encapsulate their pragmatic triumph: "Don’t worry, Misha. With money, we can live just fine without wit!"

== Cast ==
- Georgy Vitsin as Misha Balzaminov
- Lyudmila Shagalova as Pavla Balzaminnova, his Mother
- Lidiya Smirnova as Akulina Krasavina, Matchmaker
- Ekaterina Savinova as Matryona
- Zhanna Prokhorenko as Kapochka Nichkina
- Lyudmila Gurchenko as Ustinka, Kapochka friend
- Tamara Nosova as Kapochka's mother
- Nikolai Kryuchkov as Neuyedenov, Kapochka's uncle
- Rolan Bykov as Lukyan Chebakov
- Inna Makarova as Anfisa Pezhonova, older sister
- Nadezhda Rumyantseva as Raisa Pezhonova, younger sister
- Tatyana Konyukhova as Khimka
- Nonna Mordyukova as Domna Belotelova
- Grigory Shpigel as policeman
