= The Adjutant of His Excellency =

- Written by: Igor Bolgarin and Georgi Seversky
- Directed by: Yevgeny Tashkov
- Starring: Yuri Solomin; Vladislav Strzhelchik; Igor Starygin
- Music by: Andrei Eshpai
- Country of origin: Soviet Union
- Original language: Russian

Production
- Cinematography: Pyotr Terpsikhorov
- Running time: 377 minutes
- Production company: Mosfilm

Original release
- Release: 9 April – 11 April 1970

The Adjutant of His Excellency (Russian: Адъютант его превосходительства, romanized: Adyutant ego prevoskhoditelstva) is a Soviet television mini-series which was produced in 1969 and is set during the Russian Civil War. The plot revolves around Captain Pavel Koltsov, an agent working for the Soviet secret police who is spying on the White Volunteer Army, posing as an adjutant to a chief commander, general Kovalevsky.

== Plot ==
In the spring of 1919, Pavel Andreevitch Koltsov (Yuri Solomin), an agent of the Reds, is sent as the head of the Cheka by Martin Latsis into the Volunteer Army. On the road, he and several other White officers are captured by the "Greens" of Evgeniy Angel. Taking advantage of a right moment, Koltsov takes possession of arms, and the officers along with two Red Army commanders, also prisoners of Angel, with a fight break out of captivity. After hearing the story about the escape, Commander Vladimir Kovalevsky Zenonovich (modeled after General Vladimir May-Mayevsky) appoints Koltsov as his adjutant. Koltsov runs several covert operations while successfully passing all tests regarding his legendary status and does not give in to provocations of the counterintelligence. At the same time there is a romantic side plot in which Pavel Koltsov wins over the Tania, daughter of chief of counterintelligence Colonel Shchukin.

Another important plot line is the fate of Yura Lvov, the son of the White colonel who was killed in battle. The boy is going through a series of tragic adventures on both sides of the front until Koltsov starts taking care of him. The observant Yura guesses that Koltsov is a spy for the Reds. In a frank discussion, Koltsov manages to convince Yura that he is acting with good and noble intentions.

At the end of the film Koltsov sacrifices himself to destroy the special train of the Whites with British tanks, which is driven to the front. Koltsov gets arrested and imminent death awaits him.

The titles before each series state "Dedicated to the first Chekists".

== Cast ==
- Yury Solomin as Pavel Andreevich Koltsov, also known as "Old Man", captain, adjutant of General Kovalevsky
- Vladislav Strzhelchik as Lieutenant-General Vladimir Zenonovich Kovalevsky, commander of the Volunteer Army
- Vladimir Kozel as Colonel Nikolay G. Shchukin, head of counterintelligence of the Volunteer Army (according to A. Dvigubski, real name Shuchkin)).
- Tatiana Ivanitskaya as Tanya Shchukina, daughter of Colonel Shchukin
- Alexander Milokostiy as Yura, son of Colonel Lvov
- Anatoli Papanov as Yevgeny Angel, gang leader of the "Greens" (a historical figure)
- Victor Pavlov as Miron Osadchy, a member of Angel's gang, later an intelligence agent of the Whites
- Michael Kokshenov as Pavel, a member of Angel's gang
- Yevgeny Tashkov as Martin Yanovich Latsis, the head of the All-Ukrainian Cheka (a historical figure)
- Nikolay Timofeev as Frolov, Red security officer
- Yevgeny Shutov as Semyon Krasilnikov, Red security officer
- Andrei Petrov as Sirotin, Red commander
- Yuriy Nazarov as Emelyanov, Red commander
- Daniel Netrebin as Red Commander
- Gennady Karnovich-Valois as Colonel Lvov
- Oleg Golubitskiy as gendarme captain Wolin
- Vladimir Grossman as Lieutenant / Captain Duditsky
- Igor Starygin as Mickey, lieutenant, junior adjutant of Kovalevsky
- Valentin Smirnitsky as Captain Rostovtsev
- Gediminas Girdvainis as Intelligence Lieutenant
- German Yushko as Timka, Angel's orderly
- Yuri Medvedev as Nikita, a member of Angel's gang
- Nikolai Gritsenko as Vikentiy Pavlovich Speransky, director of the Kiev White underground movement
- Sofya Pavlova as Ksenia Andreevna, wife of Speransky
- Boris Novikov Isaac Liberson, the Kiev jeweler
- Elizaveta Auerbach as Sofa, wife of Liberson
- Lev Polyakov as Zagladin, a member of the White underground movement
- Ivan Solovyov as Reznikov, chief of staff of the Reds
- Nikolai Grabbe as Kosobrodov
- Konstantin Zheldin as Captain Viktor Zakharovich Osipov, counterintelligence officer of the Volunteer Army, assistant of Shchukin
- Alexey Presnetsov as Basov, or "Nikolai Nikolaevich", former colonel, operations chief of army staff of Reds and White spy
- Sergey Zeitz as Binsky, Kiev White underground worker,
- Sergey Polezhaev as Kiev White underground fighter, "brother" of Binsky
- Lyudmila Chursina as Oksana
- Peter Dolzhanov as Lev Fedotov, jeweler
- Peter Kudlay as mayor of Kharkov, colonel Schetinin (a historical figure)
- Yevgeny Teterin as Startsev, numismatist, courier for the Reds
- Larissa Danilina as Natasha, daughter of a coin collector, resident of the intelligence network of the Reds
- Alexander Barushnoy as English Brigadier Brix, a representative of the Allied
- Gleb Plaksin as French general
- Vera Yenyutina as false Koltsov's mother
- Aleksei Smirnov as crook
- Arthur Nischenkin as Klёnkin, security officer
- Boris Yurchenko as Chekist
- Victor Uralsky as watchman at the Kharkov station, White
- Valentine Berezutskaya as passenger
- Nikolai Barmin as the station
- Vladimir Marenkov as one-legged shoemaker, a liaison of the Whites
- Valentin Grachev as Sazonov, security officer
- Yuri Leonidov as Colonel Lebedev
- Margarita Kosheleva as Yura's mother
- Margarita Krinitsyna as lady on the stairs, whom Miron Osadchy questions about Gritsenko's lawyer
- Sergei Kalinin as Passenger (uncredited)
- Konstantin Tyrtov as prison sentry (episode)

== Production ==
At first Mikhail Nozhkin was approved for the role of agent Koltsov and Yuri Solomin to play the supporting role of a staff officer. But the film director Yevgeni Tashkov decided that Yuri Solomin was better suited to play the lead role.

For portraying the character of Captain Yuri Solomin Koltsov, Solomin was awarded the State Prize of the RSFSR and the title of "Honored Artist of the RSFSR".
