= Anastasia Voznesenskaya =

Soviet and Russian actress (1943–2022)

- Анастасия Вознесенская
- Born: Anastasia Valentinovna Voznesenskaya; 27 July 1943; Moscow, Russian SFSR, USSR
- Died: 14 January 2022 (aged 78); Moscow, Russia
- Occupation: Actress
- Years active: 1965–2022
- Spouse: Andrey Myagkov (m. 1963; died 2021)
- Awards: People's Artist of the Russian Federation (1997), Order of Honour (2009)

Anastasia Valentinovna Voznesenskaya (Russian: Анастасия Валентиновна Вознесе́нская; 27 July 1943 – 14 January 2022) was a Russian film and stage actress. She was awarded People's Artist of the Russian Federation in 1997.

== Early life and career ==
Voznesenskaya was born on 27 July 1943, in Moscow and studied at the Moscow Art Theater School. After graduating from the Studio School in 1965, Voznesenskaya was accepted into the troupe of the Sovremennik Theater. After Oleg Yefremov left Sovremennik, she followed him to the Moscow Art Theater.

She made her film debut in 1965. She became widely known for the main female role in the popular film Major Whirlwind.

Voznesenskaya last appeared on the stage of the Chekhov Moscow Art Theater in May 2013, in the play White Rabbit together with her husband, actor Andrey Myagkov.

== Personal life and death ==
Voznesenskaya was married to the actor Andrey Myagkov from 1963 until his death in 2021. They did not have children.

In late December 2021, Voznesenskaya tested positive for COVID-19. She died from the virus in Moscow on 14 January 2022, at the age of 78. She is buried in Troyekurovskoye Cemetery near her husband.

== Selected filmography ==
- No Password Necessary (1967) as Sashenyka Gavrilina
- Major Whirlwind (1967) as Anya
- To Love (1968) as Girl with a globe
- Adam and Eve (1969) as Ishat
- The Garage (1979) as Anna Alekseevna Kushakova, Market Director
- Station for Two (1983) as Yuliya
- Crash – Cop's Daughter (1989) as Vera Nikolayeva, Valeria's mother
