= How Nadya Went to Get Vodka =

- Directed by: Vladimir Mirzoyev
- Written by: Irina Vaskovskaya
- Produced by: Yevgeniya Solyanykh
- Starring: Nadezhda Igoshina; Yevgeniya Solyanykh; Yevgeny Tsyganov; Yana Troyanova
- Cinematography: Anton Mironovich; Yuri Burak
- Music by: Ivan Lubennikov
- Release date: October 29, 2020
- Country: Russia
- Language: Russian

How Nadya Went to Get Vodka (Russian: Как Надя пошла за водкой) is a 2020 Russian comedy film directed by Vladimir Mirzoyev. It was theatrically released in Russia on October 29, 2020.

== Plot ==
The film tells about two sisters who dream of finding a man and enter into competition until they find out that this man lives in a loveless marriage, as a result of which they decide to unite and return him to normal life.

== Cast ==
- Nadezhda Igoshina as Nadya
- Yevgeniya Solyanykh as Valya
- Yevgeny Tsyganov as Alexey
- Yana Troyanova as Psina
