= Anatoli Papanov =

Soviet and Russian actor

- Анатолий Папанов
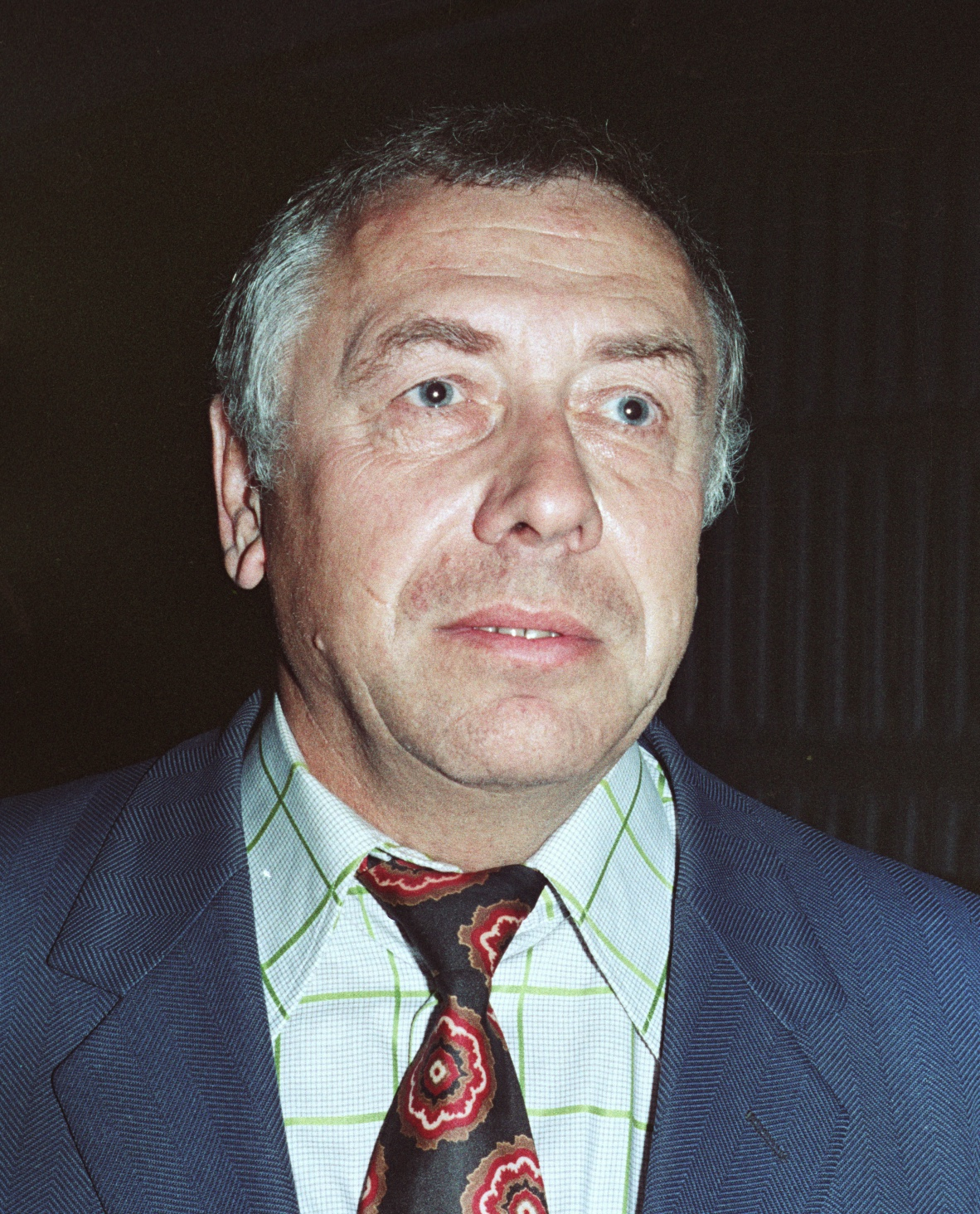
- Papanov in 1979
- Born: 31 October 1922; Vyazma, Smolensk Governorate, Russian SFSR
- Died: 5 August 1987 (aged 64); Moscow, Soviet Union
- Body discovered: 7 August 1987
- Resting place: Novodevichy Cemetery
- Occupations: Actor; theater director; pedagogue
- Years active: 1937–1987
- Spouse: Nadezhda Karatayeva (m. 1945–1987; his death)
- Children: 1
- Awards: Order of the October Revolution; Order of the Patriotic War; Order of the Patriotic War; Order of the Red Banner of Labour; USSR State Prize; Vasilyev Brothers State Prize of the RSFSR

Anatoli Dmitriyevich Papanov (Russian: Анатолий Дмитриевич Папанов; 31 October 1922 – 5 August 1987) was a Soviet and Russian actor, drama teacher, and theatre director at the Moscow Satire Theatre where he served for almost 40 years. A prominent character actor, Papanov is mostly remembered for his comedy roles in a duo with his friend Andrei Mironov, although he had many dramatic roles as well. As a voice actor, he contributed to over one hundred cartoons. He was named People's Artist of the USSR in 1973 and awarded the USSR State Prize posthumously.

== Early and war years ==
Anatoli Papanov was born in Vyazma, Smolensk Governorate (modern-day Smolensk Oblast, Russia) into a mixed Russian-Polish family. His father Dmitry Filippovich Papanov was a retired soldier who served as a railway guard and an amateur actor at the local theatre founded by Nikolai Plotnikov, where Anatoli and his sister also performed as children. His mother Yelena Boleslavovna Roskovskaya was a Belarus-born Polish milliner who secretly converted from Roman Catholicism to Russian Orthodoxy. Anatoli himself was raised in Orthodox traditions.

In 1930, the family moved to Moscow. As a schoolboy, Papanov attended drama courses, then went on to work as a caster at a factory, simultaneously performing in a popular theatre studio for factory workers organized by Vakhtangov Theatre actors led by Vasily Kuza whom Papanov later considered his first teacher. During the late 1930s, he made a number of uncredited appearances in movies, such as a sailor in Lenin in October (1937) or a passerby in The Foundling (1939).

In 1941, after the invasion of the Soviet Union, Papanov joined the Red Army and, as a senior sergeant, headed an anti-aircraft warfare platoon on the front lines. In June 1942, he was badly wounded by an explosion and lost two toes on his right foot. He spent six months in a military hospital and was sent home as disabled, and for the next several years he could only walk with a cane. In 1985 he was awarded the 1st class Order of the Patriotic War.

In 1943, despite his injury, Papanov enrolled as a student in the acting faculty of the State Institute of Theatre Arts, taking courses with Vasily Orlov. During his studies he met his future wife and fellow student Nadezhda Yuryevna Karatayeva (born 1924), who had also served in the war as a nurse on a hospital train. They married on 20 May 1945, ten days after the end of the war.

== Career ==
=== Theatre ===
In 1946, after graduating from the State Institute, Papanov left for Klaipėda, Lithuanian SSR, along with other students. There, they founded the Klaipėda Russian Drama Theatre, where he performed for several years. In 1948, Andrey Goncharov suggested he join the Moscow Satire Theatre, where he continued to act up until his death, performing in about 50 plays.

Among his popular roles were Alexander Koreiko in The Little Golden Calf (1958), Kisa Vorobyaninov in The Twelve Chairs (1960, both based on the novels by Ilf and Petrov), Vasily Tyorkin in Aleksandr Tvardovsky's Tyorkin in the Other World (1966), Anton Antonovich in Nikolai Gogol's The Government Inspector (1972), Nikolai Shubin in Grigori Gorin's and Arkady Arkanov's Little Comedies of the Big House (1973), Pavel Famusov in Alexander Griboyedov's Woe from Wit (1976), Roman Khludov in Mikhail Bulgakov's Flight (1977), Leonid Gayev in Anton Chekhov's The Cherry Orchard (1984), and others.

Apart from performing, Papanov also taught acting at the Russian Institute of Theatre Arts, and in 1986 he staged his first and last play, The Last Ones by Maxim Gorky. Being a devout Christian, Papanov wanted to end the play with a prayer. To avoid possible censorship, he used a radio record of Feodor Chaliapin performing a prayer.

=== Cinema ===
During the 1960s, Papanov began regularly appearing in films. He performed leading roles in the comedies Come Tomorrow, Please... (1962), directed by Yevgeny Tashkov, and Children of Don Quixote (1965), directed by Yevgeny Karelov, and appeared in several comedies by Eldar Ryazanov, including The Man from Nowhere (1961), where he played four roles at once. It didn't bring him any fame, though, as the movie was heavily criticized upon release and quickly banned for 25 years straight.

Papanov became very famous, however, after his work as General Serpilin in Aleksandr Stolper's war drama The Living and the Dead (1964). For this role he was awarded the Vasilyev Brothers State Prize of the RSFSR and the main prize at the First All-Union Film Festival, and Konstantin Simonov personally lauded his work.

In 1966, Eldar Ryazanov released Beware of the Car, in which Papanov appeared alongside his friend Andrei Mironov, with Mironov as a modern-day black marketeer, and Papanov as his father-in-law, a war veteran who mocks him all the way through. Its popularity led Leonid Gaidai to cast them in his 1968 comedy The Diamond Arm as the main antagonists, a pair of smugglers who tried to get their hands on the hero's "diamond arm". The film was seen by 76.7 million people in the year of release, becoming the third most popular Soviet movie of all time. In 1971, Gaidai also considered casting both actors for the leading parts in his adaptation of The Twelve Chairs, but decided otherwise. In 1976, Mark Zakharov directed his own TV adaptation of the book and eventually cast both actors in the leading roles, reuniting them for the last time.

Papanov was also highly sought after by animation directors. His distinguishing growling voice suited all kinds of beasts such as Shere Khan from Adventures of Mowgli (1967), a Soviet adaptation of The Jungle Book. His most popular characters, though, were wolves, especially after he voiced the Wolf character in the top-rated animated series Well, Just You Wait! (1969—1986), which has been considered his best role, overshadowing all of his other work, to his great displeasure.

== Death ==
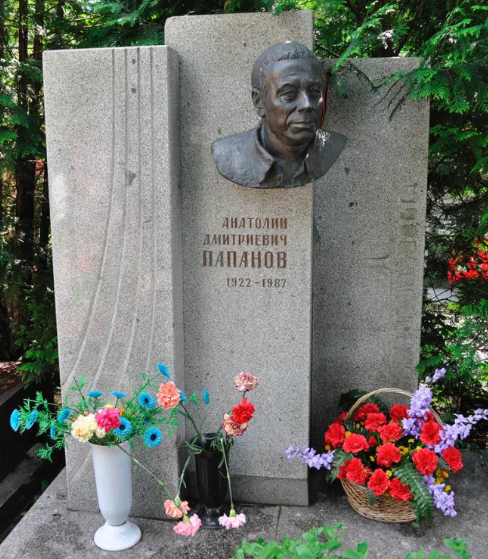
Papanov's grave in Novodevichy Cemetery

Papanov died on August 5, 1987, at the age of 64 in Moscow, USSR. According to the details, after performing his final role, The Cold Summer of 1953. He went back to his apartment. He was prepared for a bath, and he suffered a myocardial infarction in his bathtub filled with cold water.

It was discovered that there was officially a lack of hot water in the USSR back in the 1980s caused by the district heating system. Nadezhda Karatayeva, Papanov's wife, found him deceased in the bathtub on August 7, 1987, after being in Riga, Latvian SSR. The primary cause of death was listed as "acute coronary syndrome and cardiovascular failure caused by cold shock response".

His funeral took place on August 11, 1987, in Novodevichy Cemetery and was survived by his wife Nadezhda Karatayeva, who also performed at the Moscow Satire Theatre, and their daughter, Yelena Papanova, a theatre and film actress.

Asteroid No. 2480 is named after Papanov. In 2012, a monument in memory of Papanov was opened in his native Vyazma. One of the streets in Mikhaylovsk, Stavropol Krai is named after the actor.

== Selected filmography ==
=== Movies ===
- Lenin in October (1937) as sailor (uncredited)
- The Foundling (1939) as passerby (uncredited)
- Minin and Pozharsky (1939) as peasant boy (uncredited)
- Composer Glinka (1952) as aide-de-camp
- The Inspector-General (1952) as official (uncredited)
- How Robinson Was Created (almanac "Absolutely Seriously", 1961) as chief editor
- Man Follows the Sun (1961) as super
- The Cossacks (1961) as cornet
- The Man from Nowhere (1961) as Arkady Krokhalyov / tribal chief / theatre actor / bully
- A Trip Without a Load (1962) as Akim Sevastyanovich
- Come Tomorrow, Please... (1962) as Nikolay Vasilievich (voiced by Yevgeny Tashkov)
- The Living and the Dead (1964) as major general Fyodor Serpilin
- The Green Flame (1964) as Boris Zhmurkin
- Children of Don Quixote (1965) as Pyotr Bondarenko
- Our House (1965) as father
- Give me a complaints book (1965) as a maître d'hôtel Vasily Kutaytsev
- Going Inside a Storm (1965) as Anykeyev, the head of the lab
- Beware of the Car (1966) as Sokol-Kruzhkin, Semitsvetov's father-in-law
- Retribution (1967) as major general Fyodor Serpilin
- Seven Old Men and a Girl (1968) as legal adviser
- Two Comrades Were Serving (1968) as regimental commander
- The Diamond Arm (1968) as Lyolik the smuggler
- The Golden Calf (1968) as Vasisualy Lokhankin (deleted scene)
- The Adjutant of His Excellency (1969) as Yevgeny Angel
- Belorussian station (1970) as Nikolai Dubinsky
- All The King's Men (1971) as Burden Sr.
- Gentlemen of Fortune (1971) as chess player in a hotel
- The Bad Good Man (1973) as Samoilenko the doctor
- Eleven Hopes (1975) as Vorontsov
- The Twelve Chairs (1976) as Kisa Vorobianinov
- Mama, I'm Alive (1977) as Lopatkin the home owner
- Incognito from St. Petersburg (1977) as mayor Anton Antonovich Skvoznik-Dmuhanovsky
- Domestic Circumstances (1977) as male nanny
- Engineer Graftio (1979) as Genrikh Graftio
- Comic Lover, or Love Escapades of Sir John Falstaff (1983) as Falstaff
- The Cold Summer of 1953 (1987) as Nikolai "Kopalych" Starobogatov (voiced by Igor Yefimov)

=== Animation ===
- The Key (1961) as Zmei Gorynich's third head
- A Little Frog Is looking for His Father (1964) as Crocodile
- Fitil (1964—1984) as various roles
- Rikki-Tikki-Tavi (1965) as Nag
- Adventures of Mowgli (1967—1971) as Shere Khan
- The Little Mermaid (1968) as guide
- Well, Just You Wait! (1969—1994, 18 episodes) as Wolf (voice samples in episodes 17—18)
- Happy Merry-Go-Round № 5 (1973) as Nikodim
- Sack of Apples (1974) as Wolf
- Ded Moroz And a Gray Wolf (1978) as Wolf
- A Flying Ship (1979) as Vodyanoy
- The Three on Island (1986) as pirate
- The Hare and the Leader (2021 workprint) as Wolf the Leader (hero)
