= Boris Godunov (2011 film) =

2011 Russian drama film

- Directed by: Vladimir Mirzoyev
- Written by: Vladimir Mirzoyev
- Produced by: Natalya Yegorova; Vladimir Mirzoyev
- Starring: Maksim Sukhanov; Andrey Merzlikin
- Cinematography: Pavel Kostomarov
- Music by: Nikolay Anokhin; Sergey Belyaev; Yuri Dementiev; Nail Kuramshin
- Production company: Parsuna
- Release date: September 4, 2011
- Running time: 124 minutes
- Country: Russia
- Language: Russian

Boris Godunov (Russian: Борис Годунов) is a 2011 Russian drama film directed by Vladimir Mirzoyev.

== Plot ==
Based on Alexander Pushkin's 1825 play Boris Godunov, the story opens from the scene of the murder in Uglich of the young heir to the Russian throne by unknown persons. It takes several years. Boris Godunov is persuaded to accept the remaining vacant throne, despite his doubts. During the press conference, the clerk announces Godunov's decision to ascend the kingdom. People are discussing this decision with the TV. Behind the king's back is the secret, covert struggle of several boyar factions for dominance under the new government. Godunov, who ascended the throne, obsessively pursues the vision of the boy he killed. Meanwhile, the monk Grigory Otrepyev hiding in the Chudov Monastery. After a conversation with Pimen, he learns the secret of the murder runs from the monastery and decides to try to come to power. Enlisting foreign aid and gathering the army, Grigory is sent to Moscow.

Invalid individual choice or a karmic mistake can lead to a chain of fatal events. If a person is in power, it can become a problem for the whole nation.

== Cast and characters ==
- Maksim Sukhanov as Boris Godunov
- Andrey Merzlikin as Grigory Otrepyev, the False Dmitri
- Leonid Gromov as Vasili Shuysky
- Dmitry Pevtsov as Prince Ivan Mikhailovich Vorotynsky
- Agnia Ditkovskyte as Marina Mniszech
- Valentinas Masalskis as Jerzy Mniszech
- Pyotr Fyodorov as Basmanov
- Leonid Parfyonov as Shchelkalov
- Mikhail Kozakov as Father Pimen
- Andrey Tashkov as Patriarch Job of Moscow
- Yevgeni Ponasenkov as Polish Prince
- Tatyana Lyutaeva as tavern owner
- Yelena Koreneva as episode

== Awards and nominations ==
Nika Award

- Maksim Sukhanov (Best Actor), Andrey Merzlikin (Best Supporting Actor) – nom
