= Viktor Pavlov =

Russian actor

- Виктор Павлов
- Born: Viktor Pavlovich Pavlov; 5 October 1940; Moscow, Soviet Union
- Died: 24 August 2006 (aged 65); Moscow, Russia
- Occupation: Actor
- Years active: 1961—2006

Viktor Pavlovich Pavlov (Russian: Ви́ктор Па́влович Па́влов; October 5, 1940–August 24, 2006) was a Russian stage and film actor.

Pavlov worked in some of the most popular theatres of Moscow: 1963–1965 – Sovremennik Theatre, Yermolova Theatre (1965–1969), Mayakovsky Theatre (1969–1977), Malyi Theatre (1977–1985), Yermolova Theatre (1985–1990), Malyi Theatre (1990–2006).

He appeared in over 120 films in his native country. His first appearance on film was in When the Trees Were Tall (1961). His most popular films are: Operation Y, The Meeting Place Cannot Be Changed, The Twelve Chairs, The Adjutant of His Excellency, Dauria, Trial on the Road, Gambrinus, and Children of Monday. His last appearances were in The Envy of Gods (2000), DMB (2000) and Brigada (2002).

== Biography ==
=== Early life and education ===
Viktor Pavlovich Pavlov was born on October 6, 1940, in Moscow. His father, Pavel Igantievich, was an engineer who later had a high post in the Ministry of Agriculture and his mother a doctor. His childhood, which coincided with the war, passed in the Arbat District on Sivtsev Vrazhek Lane.

The son, who grew up practically on the street among juvenile delinquents, delivered a lot of troubles to his parents. His ear was severely damaged in a fight, after which it ended up protruding for the rest of his life. When Pavlov became a participant in a theft, his father already held a high post in the Ministry of Agriculture. Only this helped his son escape the youth colony, but he was expelled from school.

Viktor started to perform on stage early. At first he was engaged in children's district choir, then he successfully took part in all theatrical productions of his school.

In 1956, after graduating from the eight-year school, to help the family and get the experience for admission to the university, Viktor got a job as an apprentice of a locksmith, then became a radio installer and at the same time attended the evening school of working young people.

During this period, he attended the theater studio at the Teacher's House, which was led by a famous actor, director and teacher Vadim Bogomolov, who became his first theater teacher and supported his decision to go to art.

In 1959, Viktor Pavlov entered the Moscow Art Theatre School, but transferred to the Mikhail Shchepkin Higher Theatre School, where he was enrolled in the course of Vera Pashennaya and Nikolay Annenkov.

=== Theatre ===
In 1963, after graduating from the school, Viktor Pavlov was invited to the Sovremennik Theatre, where he participated in the performances "Naked King" (Christian), "The Elder Sister" (Ogorodnikov), "Forever Alive" (Zaitsev), "Snow White and seven dwarfs"(Wednesday), "Cyrano de Bergerac" (Linear)," Two colors "(Turnip), etc.

In 1965, Viktor Pavlov moved to the Yermolova Theatre and worked there until 1969, then left and returned in 1985 and worked until 1990. On this stage, they played the roles of Beavers in the production of "The Time and Family of Conway", Bulanov in the play "Forest", Dupont Dufour's son in "The Ball of Thieves", Paisiy's father in "Beg", Nechipurenko in "Speak", Kazmin in "The Last visitor", Mikhalev in "Sports Scenes of 1981", Jacques in the play" The Second Year of Freedom ", etc.

From 1969 to 1977, Viktor Pavlov worked at the Mayakovsky Theatre, where he played roles in many performances, each of which became events in the theatrical life of Moscow: "Conversations with Socrates" (Melet), "Defeat" (Styrksha), "Man of (Sancho Panza), Talents and admirers (Vasya), Vanyushin's Children (Krasavin), The Duma of the British (Egor Ivanovich), The Aristocrats (Kulak) and many others.

From 1977 to 1985 and from 1990 until his death, Viktor Pavlov worked at the State Academic Maly Theater. Among the roles he played on the stage of this theater are the Jester in "King Lear", Roman Somonovsky ("My Favorite Clown"), Vladimir Nikolayevich ("Conversations with a Clear Moon"), Ashmetev ("Diksarka"), Shpekin ("Inspector"), Repetilov ("Woe from Wit") and many others. Among the latest works of the artist Bezhars ("Criminal mother, or Second Tartuffe"), Gradoboev ("Hot Heart"), Zagoretsky ("Woe from Wit"), Arkashka Schastlivtsev ("Forest").

=== Film ===
Work in the theater Viktor Pavlov combined with work in film and television. His debut in the movie took place when he was a fourth-year student. These were episodic roles in Lev Kulidzhanov in the film When the Trees Were Tall and Stanislav Rostotsky in the film On the Seven Winds.

The first important role of Viktor Pavlov was the student Dub in Leonid Gaidai's comedy Operation Y and Shurik's Other Adventures

Fame came to the actor in 1967 after the role of scout Kolya Grishanchikov in the television movie Major Whirlwind directed by Yevgeny Tashkov based on the eponymous novel by Julian Semenov.

Viktor Pavlov appeared in more than 120 films of various genres, by prominent directors of Soviet and Russian cinema. He was shot in such films as The Twelve Chairs, The Meeting Place Cannot Be Changed, The Adjutant of His Excellency, On the Seven Winds, Time, Forward!, Dauria, At War as at War, The Wizard of the Emerald City, Leaving Away, Hello and Farewell, Trial on the Road, Lilac Ball, Gambrinus, Orphaned Kazan, Children of Monday, The Envy of Gods, Demobbed, Strugovye, The Battle in Blizzard, Emelyan Pugachev, Cynics, The Master and Margarita and many others.

Among the latest works of Viktor Pavlov were episodic roles in the series Deadly Force and Dasha Vasilieva, a Lover of Private Investigation, in the films Moscow Laughs and Dreaming of Space.

Viktor Pavlov was a member of the Union of Theater Workers and the Union of Cinematographers.

=== Illness and death ===
In Kyiv, on the set of the film Curator, in which the actor played his last role in the movie, he suffered a stroke.

Viktor Pavlov died August 24, 2006, from a heart attack in his Moscow apartment. He was buried in Moscow at the Kuntsevo Cemetery next to his father's grave.

=== Personal life ===
Viktor Pavlov was married to the actress of the M.N. Yermolova Theatre Tatyana Nikolayevna Govorova. Their daughter Aleksandra (born in 1967) is a doctor.

== Honors and awards ==
- People's Artist of Russia (1994)
- Moscow Première prize for his acting in The Forest by Alexander Ostrovsky
- Order of Merit for the Fatherland, 4th class (1999)
- Medal "Veteran of Labour"
- Medal "In Commemoration of the 850th Anniversary of Moscow" (1997)

== Death ==
He died in Moscow on August 24, 2006, aged 65 of natural causes.

== Selected filmography ==
- When the Trees Were Tall (1961)
- Time, Forward! (1965)
- Operation Y and Shurik's Other Adventures (1965) as "Dub"
- Major Whirlwind (1967) as Kolya
- At War as at War (1969)
- Trial on the Road (1971) as Kutenko
- The Twelve Chairs (1971) as Kolya Kalachov
- Dauria (1971) as Nikifor, a hard core Cossack
- The Adjutant of His Excellency (1974) as Miron Osadchy
- The Meeting Place Cannot Be Changed (1979) as Levchenko
- Say a Word for the Poor Hussar (1981) as jailer Stepan
- Farewell of Slavianka (1985) as Fyodor
- Lilac Ball (1987) as Man-eater
- All Costs Paid (1988) as Snegirev
- Bright Personality (Светлая личность, 1988) as Cain Dobroglasov
- Gardemarines ahead! (1988) as Kotov
- Katala (1989) as Crucian
- The Master and Margarita (1994) as Behemoth
- Demobbed (ДМБ, 2000) as General Talalaev
- The Envy of Gods (2000) as Vilen
- Deadly Force (2002-2003)
- Dreaming of Space (2005)
