= Newcomer (film) =

Soviet film (1977)

- Russian: Приезжая
- Directed by: Valeriy Lonskoy
- Written by: Artur Makarov
- Starring: Zhanna Prokhorenko; Aleksandr Mikhaylov
- Cinematography: Vladimir Papyan
- Edited by: Ekaterina Karpova
- Music by: Georgy Firtich
- Release date: 1977
- Running time: 100 minute
- Country: Soviet Union
- Language: Russian

Newcomer (Russian: Приезжая, romanized: Priezhaya) is a 1977 Soviet romantic drama film directed by Valeriy Lonskoy.

The film tells about the love of the village driver Fyodor for the teacher Mariya, who, together with her daughter, visits his village. They begin to live together. Everything was fine with them, until her ex-husband arrived in the village.

== Plot ==
A new geography teacher, Maria Vladimirovna Nesterova, arrives in a rural village with her young daughter, Katya. They are given a ride by Fyodor Semyonovich Barinev, a local collective farm driver. Struck by Maria's beauty, Fyodor is immediately drawn to her and begins to court her, but Maria remains distant. At the same time, a young and frivolous villager named Vanya Timonin, nicknamed "Kochetok," also tries to win Maria’s affection. However, Fyodor quickly puts an end to Vanya's advances, making it clear that he won’t tolerate competition for Maria’s attention.

As time passes, Fyodor’s love for Maria deepens, and living near her without reciprocation becomes increasingly painful. He considers leaving the village to work in a distant collective farm to escape his unrequited feelings but soon returns, determined to marry her. His wise father persuades him to be patient. Meanwhile, Maria’s former partner, Vladimir Sergeyevich Korneev, unexpectedly arrives in the village. Unaware of Katya’s existence, he seeks to meet his daughter. Vanya, after realizing who Vladimir is, rushes back to warn Maria of her ex’s arrival. Alarmed, Maria turns to Fyodor for help, and he intercepts Vladimir on the road. Their tense conversation escalates into a fight, interrupted only by Maria’s arrival with her loyal dog, Mergen. Vladimir leaves, and at last, Maria and Fyodor find themselves alone, with a new understanding between them.

== Cast ==
- Zhanna Prokhorenko as Maria Nesterova
- Yelena Ikonitskaya as Katya
- Aleksandr Mikhaylov as Fyodor Barinev
- Sergei Ponachevny as Semyon Arsentevich Barinev
- Yelena Kuzmina as Klavdiya Barineva
- Mariya Skvortsova as Anisya Borisova
- Sergei Torkachevsky as Vanya 'Kochetok'
- Lev Borisov as Yakov Silin
- Maria Vinogradova as Sasha
- Vladimir Zemlyanikin as Stepan Shokhin
- Tatyana Kravchenko as Seraphima
- Raisa Ryazanova as Evdokia
- Andrey Tashkov as Aleksei

== Release ==
The film premiered in May 1978, reaching 14th place at the box office, with 27.4 million viewers.
