= Gogi Gegechkori =

Georgian actor (1923–2003)

- გოგი გეგეჭკორი
- Gogi Gegechkori
- Born: Giorgi Gegechkori; 23 February 1923; Tbilisi, Transcaucasian SFSR, Soviet Union
- Died: 11 March 2003 (aged 80); Tbilisi, Georgia
- Resting place: Didube Pantheon, Tbilisi
- Occupation: Actor
- Years active: 1944–2003
- Spouse: Natela Urushadze

Giorgi "Gogi" Vladimeris dze Gegechkori (Georgian: გოგი გეგეჭკორი; 23 February 1923 – 11 March 2003) was a Georgian stage and film actor. A leading actor of the Rustaveli Theatre in Tbilisi for nearly six decades, he was named a People's Artist of the Georgian SSR in 1966.

== Early life and education ==
Gegechkori was born on 23 February 1923 in Tbilisi, the son of the poet Vladimer Gegechkori and the teacher Tamar Gelovani. In 1944 he graduated from the acting faculty of the Shota Rustaveli Theatre Institute.

== Career ==
From 1944 Gegechkori was an actor of the Rustaveli Theatre, where he performed some 120 roles over his career. His breakthrough was the title role of the poet Nikoloz Baratashvili in Mikheil Mrevlishvili's play A Poet's Fate. His many other stage roles included Hamlet, Iago in Othello, and Tigran Guloyan in Nodar Dumbadze's The Indictment.

He made his film debut in 1954 and appeared in some thirty films. Among his best-known screen roles were Sandro Karidze in the television series Data Tutashkhia (1978) and Chachika in Tengiz Abuladze's The Wishing Tree (1976).

== Awards and honours ==
- Honoured Artist of the Georgian SSR (1955)
- People's Artist of the Georgian SSR (1966)
- Order of Lenin (1986)
- State Prize of Georgia (1997)
- Order of Honour (1998)
- Order of the Badge of Honour (1958, 1966)

== Personal life ==
Gegechkori was married to the actress Natela Urushadze; the couple had two children, Manana and Giorgi. He died in Tbilisi on 11 March 2003 and was buried at the Didube Pantheon.
