= Vadim Beroev =

Soviet actor (1937–1972)

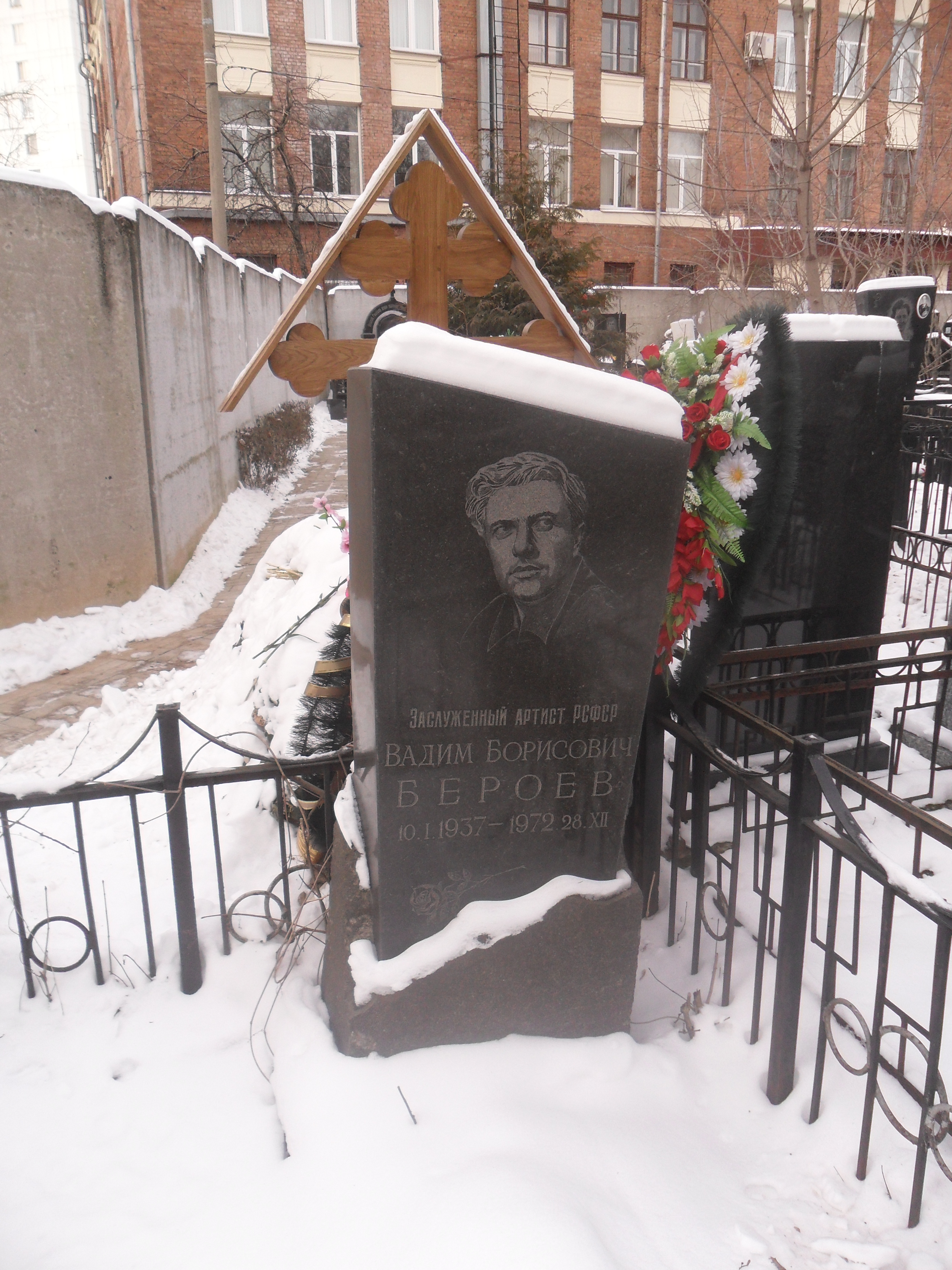
- Born: Vadim Borisovich Beroev; 10 January 1937; Humalag, North Ossetian Autonomous Soviet Socialist Republic, RSFSR, USSR
- Died: 28 December 1972 (aged 35); Moscow, RSFSR, USSR
- Resting place: Vvedenskoye Cemetery, Moscow
- Occupation: Actor
- Years active: 1957–1972
- Spouse: Elvira Shvareva-Brunovskaya

Vadim Borisovich Beroev (Russian: Вади́м Бори́сович Беро́ев, Iron Ossetic: Беройты Барисы фырт Вадим; 1937–1972) was a Soviet theatre and film actor of Ossetian origin, best known for roles in Major Whirlwind (1967) and No Path Through Fire (1968). He was awarded Honored Artist of the RSFSR in 1969. He is the grandfather of actor Egor Beroev.

== Biography ==
Vadim Beroev was born on 10 January 1937 in the Ossetian village of Humalag near Beslan.

The family later moved to Lviv where he studied at the 12th male school and graduated from Lviv school 35 in 1954. While a schoolboy, he also studied piano at the music school.

In 1957 he graduated from the Russian Academy of Theatre Arts having studied under Varvara Vronskaya, Nikolai Petrov and Boris Dokutovich. Following his graduation, he worked at the Mossovet Theatre. From 1962, in addition to his work in the theatre, Beroev worked at Radio Yunost, where his wife also worked.

He became a member of the Communist Party of the Soviet Union in 1964.

Beroev died on 28 December 1972 from Cirrhosis and was buried in Moscow's Vvedenskoye Cemetery.
