= Moscow Satire Theatre =

Theatre in Moscow, Russia

- Московский академический театр сатиры
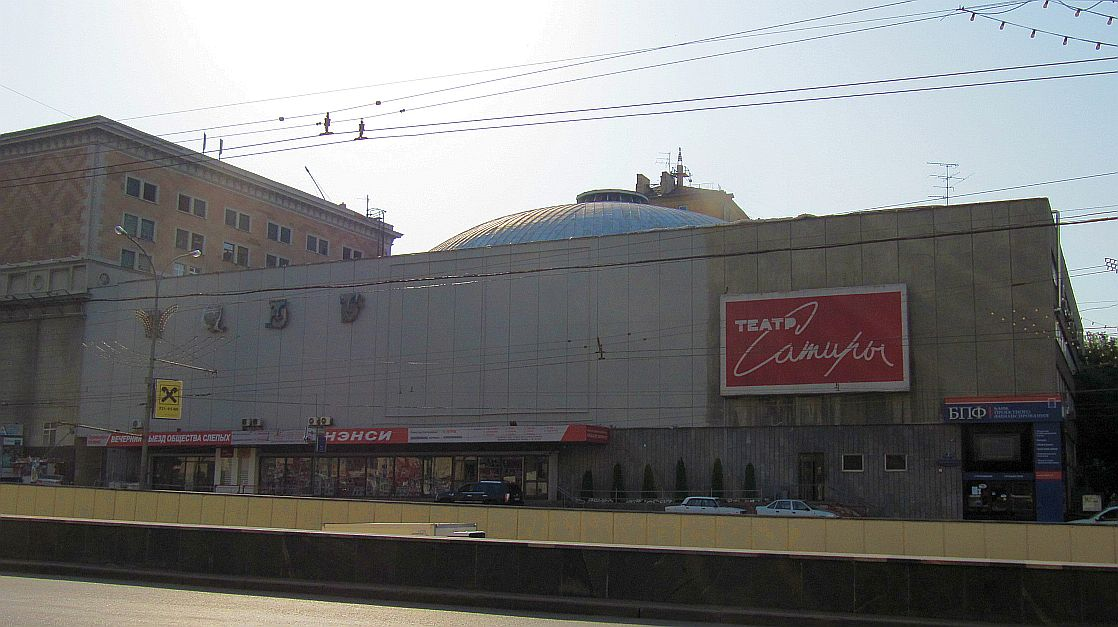
- Interactive map of Moscow Satire Theatre
- Address: Moscow; Russia
- Coordinates: 55°46′06″N 37°35′43″E

Construction
- Opened: 1924

Website
- satire.ru

The Moscow Academic Theatre of Satire (Russian: Московский академический театр сатиры) is a dramatic theatre in Moscow, Russia, established in 1924.
