= Yuri Gusev =

Soviet chess player (born 1921)

Yuri Semyonovich Gusev
Personal information
- Born: Yuri Semyonovich Gusev; September 25, 1921 Russia
- Died: 2011 (aged 89–90)

Chess career
- Country: Soviet Union
- Title: Merited Master of Sport of the USSR (1951)
- Peak rating: 2380

Yuri Gusev vs. E. Auerbach, 1946

Position: e8 black queen, g8 black king, h8 black rook, a7 black pawn, h7 black pawn, b6 black pawn, c6 black rook, d6 white queen, e6 white pawn, f6 black pawn, g6 black pawn, h6 white bishop, e5 black knight, e4 white pawn, c3 white pawn, a2 white pawn, b2 white pawn, e2 white bishop, h2 white pawn, a1 white rook, g1 white king

As White, Gusev plays the brilliant sacrifice 24. Qxe5!!, a long-term positional sacrifice that eventually choked Black into submission. It is the only move that secures an advantage for White in what is otherwise a level position.

Yuri Semyonovich Gusev (born September 25, 1921) is a Soviet chess player who was a Merited Master of Sport of the USSR (1951). He is also a former radio engineer. Gusev peaked with a classical Elo rating of 2380, making him the equivalent of a FIDE Master in terms of strength, although it is not clear what, if any, title he ultimately achieved. It is unknown if he is still alive, having been last heard from in 1999. He was reported to have died in 2011.

== Biography ==
=== Military Service ===
Gusev fought on the Volokolamsk-Moscow route during World War II. He served as a shooter, combat engineer and radio technician, achieving the rank of Sergeant Major.

=== Chess Career ===
Gusev was a participant in many championships in Moscow, including the semi-finals of the USSR Chess Championship, in which his best results were 4–6 in the XIX edition and 6–7 in the XXII edition. In 1948, he drew a match with Ilya Kan.

Gusev played a game in 1946, known as Gusev's Immortal, against E. Auerbach at Molniya Sporting Society. The game itself was not part of a major competition, but Gusev's Immortal has been brought from obscurity in the 21st century and has been widely recognized for its long-term strategic brilliance—Gusev played the shocking positional queen sacrifice 24. Qxe5, strangling Auerbach.

In 1951, the game was published in the Soviet chess magazine Shakhmaty v SSSR. E. Auerbach has been mistakenly identified as Yuri Averbakh. The game has also been mistakenly said to have taken place in 1951 at Moscow.

While Gusev's queen sacrifice was indeed proved to be the best move by comprehensive human and computer analysis, there was for decades speculation that a defensive resource existed following another later one of Gusev's moves in which his opponent could have formed a fortress to draw the game, but such a defence was only found in 2011, 65 years later after the original game. Had Gusev and Auerbach both played the objectively best moves at every point after his brilliancy, however, the game would still have been a victory for White.

Grandmaster Simon Williams called Gusev's Immortal one of the most beautiful ideas that he had ever seen.

In 1989, Gusev won the International Tournament of Veterans in Moscow. In 1990, he won the 1st Veteran Championship of the USSR.

Gusev played his last recorded game in 1999 at 77 years old at the Efim Geller Memorial.

== Awards ==
- Order of the Red Star
- Order of the Patriotic War (2nd Degree)
- Medal "For Battle Merit"
- Medal "For the Defence of Moscow"
