= Yevgeny Tashkov =

Soviet and Russian film director, screenwriter, and actor

- Born: Yevgeny Ivanovich Tashkov; 18 December 1926; Bykovo village, Stalingrad Governorate, USSR
- Died: 15 February 2012 (aged 85); Moscow, Russia
- Occupations: Film director, screenwriter, actor
- Years active: 1954—2011
- Spouses: Ekaterina Savinova (m. 1950; died 1970) Tatiana Tashkova (m. 1980)
- Children: Andrey Tashkov, Aleksei Tashkov

Yevgeny Ivanovich Tashkov (Russian: Евгений Иванович Ташков; 18 December 1926 — 15 February 2012) was a Soviet and Russian film director, screenwriter and actor known for his spy movies as well as a comedy Come Tomorrow, Please... that made a name for his wife Ekaterina Savinova. He was named Meritorious Artist of RSFSR in 1980 and People's Artist of Russia in 1995.

== Biography ==
Tashkov was born on 18 December 1926 in the Bykovo village (modern-day Bykovo, Volgograd Oblast of Russia), although his birthdate was written down as 1 January 1927. As a result, he was not drafted into the Red Army during the Great Patriotic War. His father was arrested as an enemy of the people, he and his sister Maria were raised by their mother. As a teen he visited drama courses organized in his village by a visiting actress from the Alexandrinsky Theatre.

He successfully entered VGIK. There was no free room at the dormitory, so he had to spend a night at a girls' room. As he was going to sleep, he heard the voice of Ekaterina Savinova (1926—1970) — a fellow student also from a peasant family from a far-away Siberian village — and fell in love with her. They got married in 1951.

He studied acting under Boris Bibikov (who later starred in a number of Tashkov's movies) and Olga Pyzhova, graduating in 1950. He then worked at the National Film Actors' Theatre and various film studios as an actor, second unit director and assistant director. His directorial debut happened in 1957 with Past Days Pages, a revolutionary drama shot at the Odessa Film Studio. The score was written by Andrei Eshpai who turned into Tashkov's close friend and wrote music to the majority of his movies.

After her role in Cossacks of the Kuban Savinova felt out of favour and stopped receiving big roles despite her outstanding talent both as an actress and a singer. According to Tashkov, this happened after she refused to become a lover of Ivan Pyryev and slapped him in the face. In 1962 Tashkov decided to give her the major role in his own comedy movie Come Tomorrow, Please... which he co-wrote with Savinova. A part-autobiographical film, it featured many episodes from her life. It was well-received and turned into cult classic. Tashkov himself voiced the main male part (one of Anatoly Papanov's first leading roles).

After the movie came out, they toured with concerts around the country. During that time Tashkov noticed that his wife became seriously ill. She was diagnosed with brucellosis which influenced her brain and nervous system and led to sluggish schizophrenia. She spent nine years lying in clinics, took a lot of medicine, and in 1970 she committed suicide by throwing herself under a train. Tashkov received permission to conduct a memorial service.

In 1967 he joined Mosfilm. He directed two popular spy mini-series: Major Whirlwind (1967) based on the novel by Yulian Semyonov and The Adjutant of His Excellency (1969) written by Georgy Seversky and Igor Bolgarin, although Tashkov claimed that the script was so poor that he had to rewrite it from scratch, but was left uncredited. The latter movie was awarded the Vasilyev Brothers State Prize of the RSFSR in 1971. It was also one of the first attempts to show both Red and White Army in neutral light. As Tashkov described it, "Two revolutions and the civil war — the greatest tragedy of Russian people. Both "Reds" and "Whites" were Russian people, which means it was a tragedy for all of them. I wanted to show it in my film". As a result, it was banned for four months until Tashkov invited 12 KGB generals who watched and approved it.

In 1987 he was fired from Mosfilm. After that he and his wife had to seek various opportunities to survive. Only in 2011, after 20 years of failed attempts to find sponsors, he finally got in touch with Nikita Mikhalkov who produced his last biopic The Three Women of Dostoevsky about Feodor Dostoevsky. It was released on TV 40 days after his death.

Yevgeny Tashkov died from a stroke aged 85. He was buried at the Troyekurovskoye Cemetery in Moscow.

== Personal life ==
Yevgeny Tashkov and Ekaterina Savinova had a son Andrey Tashkov (born 1957), a prominent actor who played the major part in his father's The Raw Youth based on Feodor Dostoevsky's novel of the same name.

After Savinova's tragic death in 1970 Yevgeny lived in a civil union with an actress Valentina Sharykina, and in 1979 he married another actress Tatiana Vasilieva (born 1956) who played the main part in his movie French Lessons (1978) based on the story by Valentin Rasputin. She gave birth to Alexei Tashkov in 1983 who also became a TV and movie director and co-directed Tashkov's last film.

According to Andrei Tashkov, his father and his second wife were happily married, yet he couldn't talk about Savinova calmly, and when in 1995 Leonid Filatov interviewed him about Savinova for the documentary series To Be Remembered, he collapsed with a stroke.

Yevgeny Tashkov belonged to the Russian Orthodox Church.

== Filmography ==
Year	Title	Original title			
Year	Title	Original title	Director	Screenwriter	Role
1954	Commander of the Ship	Командир корабля			sailor
1955	The First Echelon	Первый эшелон	assistant director		
1956	Old Turtle Captain	Капитан «Старой черепахи»			Rep'ev
1957	Past Days Pages	Страницы былого	✓		
1959	Thirst	Жажда	✓		
1962	Come Tomorrow, Please...	Приходите завтра...	✓	✓	Nikolai (voiceover); man in sunglasses (uncredited)
1966	False Name	Чужое имя			prosecutor Nikolay Glebov
1966	I'm from Childhood	Я родом из детства			Fyodor Baran
1967	Major Whirlwind	Майор Вихрь	✓		episode (uncredited)
1969	The Adjutant of His Excellency	Адъютант его превосходительства	✓	✓	Martin Latsis
1973	Vanyushin's Children	Дети Ванюшина	✓	✓	episode
1976	Crime	Преступление	✓	✓	film director (cameo)
1978	French Lessons	Уроки французского	✓	✓	episode (uncredited)
1983	The Raw Youth	Подросток	✓	✓	episode (uncredited)
1987	Dodgers	Ловкачи	✓	✓	episode (uncredited)
1990	Boys	Мальчики			Captain Snegiryov
1991	Clan	Клан			Nadein
1992	Smoke	Дымъ			episode
1994	The Lynx Follows the Trail	Рысь идёт по следу			episode (uncredited)
2005	Where Childhood Ends	Там, где кончается детство			episode
2011	The Three Women of Dostoevsky	Три женщины Достоевского	✓	✓	
