= Wedding Ring (TV series) =

Television series

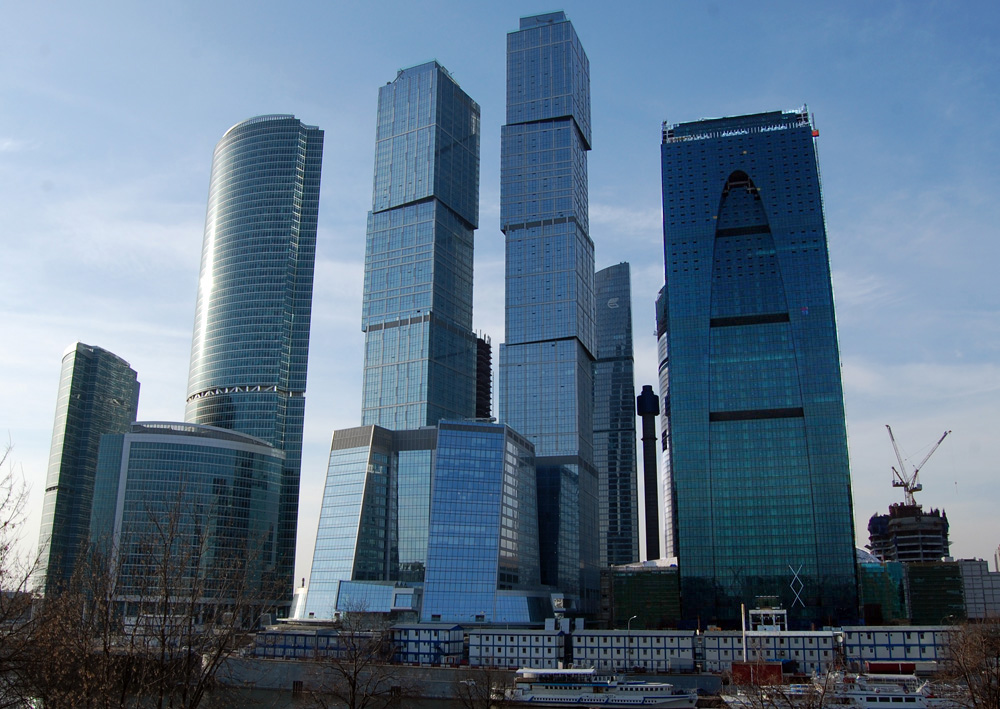
- Directed by: Dmitry Goldman
- Starring: Julia Pozhidaeva; Alina Sandratskaya; Alexander Volkov; Darya Feklenko; Yevgenia Chirkova; Yury Baturin; Lyudmila Davydova
- Music by: Alexey Shelygin
- Country of origin: Russia
- Original language: Russian

Production
- Running time: 40-50 min
- Production companies: TeleROMAN; Channel One Russia

Original release
- Release: 2008 – 2011

Wedding Ring (Russian: Обручальное кольцо, romanized: Obruchalnoe koltso) is a Russian television series filmed from 2008 to 2011. The series was awarded the TEFI-2011 in the nomination of The TV feature series.

The Russian air Wedding Ring initially showed very high ratings; for example, in the premiere week the series became the most popular among the Russian audience with 7.3% and 22.6%. However, after replacing the actors playing the main characters, the popularity of the TV series has fallen considerably.

== Plot ==
The serial narrates about three different Russian people who have met on a train to Moscow. Nastja Lapina goes from the city of Luza to help her mother Vera, who is imprisoned by mistake. The girl needs to find her father; her mother's wedding ring should assist her, as it was given to Vera by Academician Kovalyov, Nastja's father. Nastja must send 1000 dollars every month so that her mother does not get killed.

Together with her in the train compartment is Olja Prokhorova; she too is from a provincial small town, Plinishma. Olja has seen a lot during her last 20 years and is going to Moscow for the sweet life. Having seen Nastja's wedding ring, she steals it.

Igor is a person who wants to get revenge for his parents on the same Academician Kovalyov. He is traveling from a small town of Borsk. Having seen Nastja, he and she feel romantic feelings for each other, and the heroes are still to meet each other afterwards.

=== Continuation ===
Four years pass. Nastja is married to Vitja and also raises her adopted son Sasha. It is found out that Olja has lost all her money in a casino in Turkey with a new lover and doesn't know where to get more financial resources. Olja is kicked out of their apartment by lawyer Denis Evgenevich, who now lives there with his girlfriend and former schoolmate, Tamara. Olja needs money. Soon provincial psychologist Dima gets employed in Kovalyov's fund. Nastja feels that she has fallen in love with Dima and leaves Vitja for him. But Dima turns out to be Olja's boyfriend, and he and Olja plan to kill Nastja and to receive her riches, but they fail to realize their plan. Dima departs for home. Olja is pregnant from him.

About a year goes by. Olja is married to Andrey; they are raising Olja and Dima's daughter, Anja. Andrey thinks that the child is his. Olja doesn't love her husband at all; she is bothered with a monotonous life and begins to search for a rich groom again. Nastja failed to manage the Fund of Academician Kovalyov, the Fund has gone bankrupt and Nastja also needs money. Marina (Kovalyov's widow) can't forgive Nastja spoiled the business of the father. Vasilisa and Vitja live together, but Vitja can't forget Nastja. And Igor, whom all have considered as dead, unexpectedly resurrects 5 years after his supposed death; his death was only a falsification. Igor has a wife, Irina, whom he has known since childhood and has two children with. Nastja and Olja, who met on the day of Igor's wake at the cemetery, again become friends and forgive each other. Nastja works as a cleaner in a hospital and lives in a communal flat at Raisa Viktorovna's. Olja meets businessman Sergey Gavrilov; she leaves Andrey for Sergey with her daughter, Anja. She lies to Gavrilov that Nastja has died, but Gavrilov, having learned that it is not so, breaks up with Olja and starts to meet with Nastja. Olja comes back to Andrey. Because Vitja still has feelings for Nastja, Vasilisa rushes under a car. Raisa falls ill, but doesn't know what is the illness, as she refuses to go to the doctor.

== Characters ==
- Alina Sandratskaya as Olja
- Julia Pozhidaeva as Nastja
- Mikhail Remizov as Academician Kovalyov, Nastja's father
- Alexander Volkov as Igor
- Darya Feklenko as Marina
- Vera Glagoleva as Vera Lapina, Nastja's mother
- Yevgenia Chirkova as Yevgenia
- Yury Baturin as Sergey Gavrilov
- Lyudmila Davydova as Raisa Viktorovna
- Marina Golub as Klara
- Andrey Kharitonov as Denis Kolesnikov
- Mikhail Yefremov (1—60) / Vladimir Permyakov (498—506) as Pyotr, Nastja's stepfather
- Nikolay Baskov as cameo
- Nastasya Samburskaya as Natasha, an administrator in the restaurant and fitness club

== Criticism ==
Komsomolskaya Pravda, in its anti-rating The worst series of 2011, put Wedding Ring at the top.
