= The Girls (1961 film) =

- A 1962 film poster by Vladimir Kononov
- Directed by: Yuri Chulyukin
- Written by: Boris Bednyy
- Starring: Nadezhda Rumyantseva; Nikolai Rybnikov; Lyusyena Ovchinnikova
- Cinematography: Timofey Lebeshev
- Edited by: Mariya Kuzmina
- Music by: Aleksandra Pakhmutova
- Production company: Mosfilm
- Release date: March 7, 1962
- Running time: 92 minutes
- Country: Soviet Union
- Language: Russian

The Girls (a.k.a. Gals, Russian: Девчата, romanized: Devchata) is a 1961 Soviet romantic comedy drama film directed by Yuri Chulyukin based on a screenplay by Boris Bednyy.

== Plot ==
Devchata is a romantic comedy set in an isolated Russian logging camp, in the late 1950s. A pig-tailed young girl, Tosya, arrives from school with a cooking degree, and joins a group of other women who work in jobs supporting the loggers. Tosya is assigned as a cook for the camp.

Once in her dorm-like room, she cheerfully prepares herself a meal of tea and a giant loaf of bread slathered with jam; all of it from her roommates' food stockpile. When the four other girls return after a day at work, they are generally taken by Tosya's youth and good nature. However, one woman is upset that she is eating her food without permission, and a fight ensues. When the dorm-mate makes some rude comments, Tosya throws a boot at her head without hesitation. Tosya and her roommates go to the dancehall together. At first, no one will dance with her, but eventually she begins to dance with another very tall girl who is also passed up by several young men.

Meanwhile, two groups of loggers engage in a friendly dispute; one has just lost their position as the most productive in the camp, and their portraits are being taken down from a "wall of honor" by an official, who replaces them with pictures of the rival group. The leaders of the two groups play checkers, and in order to concentrate, Ilya, the leader of their group, calls out for the music to be turned off. A very tall and imposing companion carries out his order. However, Tosya, who is now enjoying her dance, marches over to the phonograph and puts the music back on. Ilya calls for the music to be turned back off, and Tosya, to the amusement of the onlookers, seems prepared to fight him in order to keep the music playing.

Impressed by Tosya's tenacity, Ilya approaches her and asks her to dance. After telling him to first throw away his cigarette and take off his hat, she proclaims that she does not want to dance with "your type."

Following this episode, Ilya bets with Filya, the leader of the rival group, that within a week he can win Tosya's heart. The winner gets the other's hat. Ilya and his gang quickly make a plan, they will first insult Tosya's cooking to break her down. They dramatically throw Tosya's stew into the snow, proclaiming it to be inedible, and bringing her to tears. Despite the ill-treatment, Tosya carries some mushroom soup to the men a few days later to their work-site in the forest. The starving men can no longer resist, and Ilya and Tosya begin to show some real affection for one another. It is also revealed that Tosya is an orphan and that Ilya is interested in exploring ways to increase the productivity of the logging operation through new techniques and technologies.

One night, Tosya's dorm-mate Anfisa reveals to the other girls the bet that Ilya has made, and there is a debate over whether to break the news to Tosya. The other girls want to keep Tosya's faith in men and love alive. When Ilya asks Tosya to a big dance, however, the girls decide that they must tell her the truth. Tosya asks quietly, "And the bet was just for a hat?" Within minutes her despair turns to indignation, and she marches off to the dance. When they reach the dance, after she calls over Filya, she asks him point blank whether there was any bet, and when he sheepishly admits that there was, she grabs Filya's hat and shoves it into Ilya's hands. She then runs out into the night (without a coat) and sobs behind a wood pile as Ilya searches for her and calls out her name.

In the weeks that follow, Ilya attempts to convince her that the bet was just a stupid prank, that he is sorry, and that he really does love her. But Tosya will not be easily swayed.

Eventually, though, during a scene in which the entire camp is pitching in to build a newly married couple their own house, Tosya and Ilya find themselves in an attic, each with a box of nails. This simple moment leads to their reconciliation, and they snuggle outside on a log, flirtatiously exploring a first kiss and talking about their future.

== Cast ==
- Nadezhda Rumyantseva as Tosya
- Nikolai Rybnikov as Ilya
- Lyusyena Ovchinnikova as Katya
- Stanislav Khitrov as Filya
- Inna Makarova as Nadya
- Svetlana Druzhinina as Anfisa
- Nina Menshikova as Vera
- Nikolai Pogodin as Sasha
- Mikhail Pugovkin as Commandant
- Anatoly Adoskin as Dementyev
- Viktor Bajkov as Ksan Ksanych
- Roman Filippov as Vasya
- Aleksei Krychenkov as Alyosha
- Pyotr Kiryutkin

== Production ==
=== Casting ===
When preparing for the film, Yuri Chulyukin promised the role of Tosya to his wife, Natalya Kustinskaya. Kustinskaya started to seriously prepare for the audition and waited for the decision from the artistic council. After a while she learned from a cinematographer with whom she was acquainted that the picture has already started shooting and that Nadezhda Rumyantseva is starring in the lead role. Chulyukin justified himself by saying that the artistic council considered Kustinskaya too beautiful for the character of Tosya, and as reconciliation offered her the role of Anfisa, but Kustinskaya refused. Tosya in the script is eighteen years old and at the time of filming Rumyantseva already turned thirty. As planned by the director, on the screen Ilya looks much older than Tosya, but in real the actors Rybnikov and Rumyantseva are the same age. The whole wardrobe of Tosya Kislitsyna was discovered by Vera Rumyantseva: the actress claims in her memoirs that she saw the clothes worn by her acquaintance, a foster-child at a children's home.

Originally Vyacheslav Shalevich and Yuri Belov auditioned for the role of Ilya and Vladimir Treshchalov was approved, but an order came to shoot Nikolai Rybnikov, who before the film portrayed the protagonist well in the movie The Height. Rybnikov really liked the role, and in order to look younger he specifically lost 20 kg. He wanted his wife, Alla Larionova to play Anfisa. But Svetlana Druzhinina was already approved for the role, and Chulyukin did not change the actress. Because of this during the filming Rybnikov's socialization with Druzhinina was frosty.

For the role of the district inspector, the director invited his longtime friend and former classmate, Vladimir Gusev without doing screen tests, but he refused.

The film was the cinematic debut of Mikhail Kokshenov: he played the woodcutter who in one gulp drank an entire carafe of water.

=== Filming locations ===
The village of lumberjacks was shot in the pavilions of Mosfilm and Mosfilmovskaya Street where about three hundred trees were planted and built village scenery with the sign "Lespromkhoz". Actual shooting began in the Middle Urals in the Chusovoy area in the village of Bobrovka (In the episode in which the characters examine a newspaper with Ilya's photo, its name "Chusovskoy worker" is plainly visible) Perm Oblast. However, since shooting at thirty-degree frost turned out to be difficult, after a few short scenes the crew continued work in the timber industry in the Oleninsky locality of the Tver region, and the final shot in Yalta. Filming wintertime scenes in the hot weather of August was bothersome for the actors who had to wear sheepskin coats along with winter hats.

The scene with the train was shot in the Ryazan Oblast on the stretch between the stations Spas-Klepiki and Pilevo.

=== Music ===
The song "Old Maple" was written by the poet Mikhail Matusovsky and composer Aleksandra Pakhmutova, it was performed by actors Lyusyena Ovchinnikova and Nikolai Pogodin. In the film the song "Good Girls" by the same authors is also played.

Songs from the film were released on records by Aprelevka and other companies and starting from the mid-1960s by the firm "Melody".

=== Sequel ===
In the late 1990s, Svetlana Druzhinina (who played Anfisa) in an interview expressed desire to make a sequel to The Girls, but the project did not come to pass.

== Release ==
The film premiered on 7 March 1962 in the Central House of Cinema (DRC) in Moscow. At the premiere, everyone who participated in making the film came except for the actress Inna Makarova, who played the role of Nadya. She was offended by the fact that in the process of editing, the director removed the scene in which her character, although "she is soon to be twenty-eight, and at this age you will settle for anyone," parts with her bridegroom Ksan Ksanych whom she does not love.

Soviet authorities described the comedy as "too mundane and slight for the Soviet screen", so a third rental category was assigned to the film. But audiences and critics liked the picture immediately and it became one of the leaders of the Soviet film distribution. In 1962, the year of the USSR premiere it was seen by almost thirty-five million people.

== Awards ==
- 1962 — Awarded at the Mar del Plata International Film Festival (Argentina) for "Best Actress" to Nadezhda Rumyantseva. Foreign newspapers described the actress as "Charlie Chaplin in a skirt", and the Italians dubbed her as the "Russian Giulietta Masina".
- 1962 — Honorary diploma of the Edinburgh International Film Festival (Scotland).
- 1962 — Honorary Diploma of the Jury of Parents and Students of the International Film Festival for Youth in Cannes.
