= Fountains of Almaty =

Fountains along with an extensive irrigation network play a great role for Almaty city. Together they create a unified complex of water bodies and streams of the city. Their objective is to irrigate greenery and create a favorable microclimate, especially in hot and dry seasons. Today, in Almaty, there are 10 programs aimed for the city improvement, including "Fountains of Almaty" - "Rivers of Almaty", which aims to develop more than 20 rivers flowing through the city.

== Facts ==
- First fountain in Almaty was unveiled in 1948.
- Tulebayev Street was once called Fountain Street.
- In total, there are 128 fountains and fountain groups in Almaty, of which 63 are communally owned.
- May 25 has been celebrated as the Day of Fountains since 2005. All fountains of Almaty start working at 9 p.m. this day.
- Fountains are working from May 25 till October 25 from 10 a.m. till 2 a.m. according to the same schedule.

== Fountains by city districts ==
=== Medeu district ===
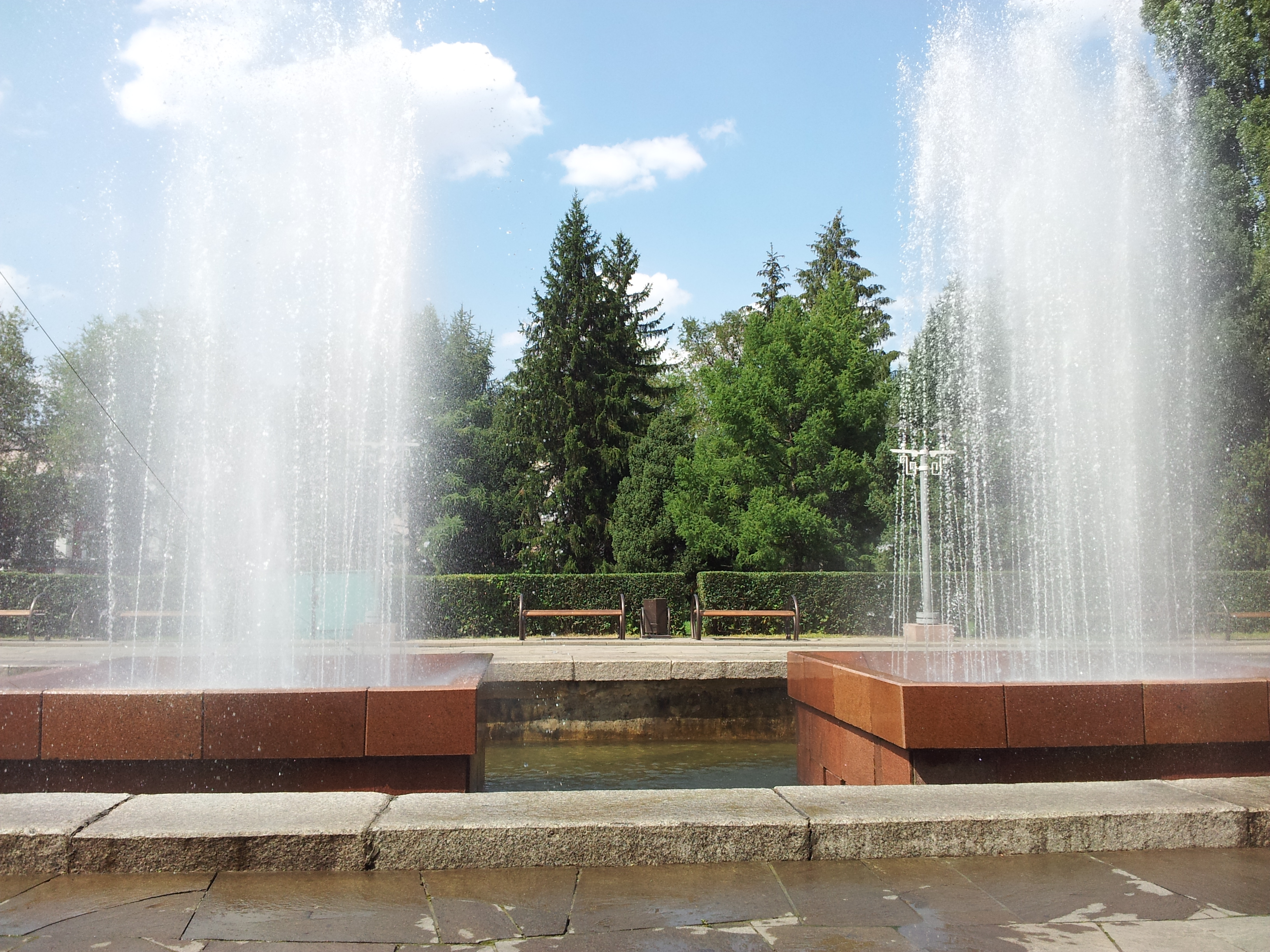
Fountains in the park near the bust of D.A. Kunayev

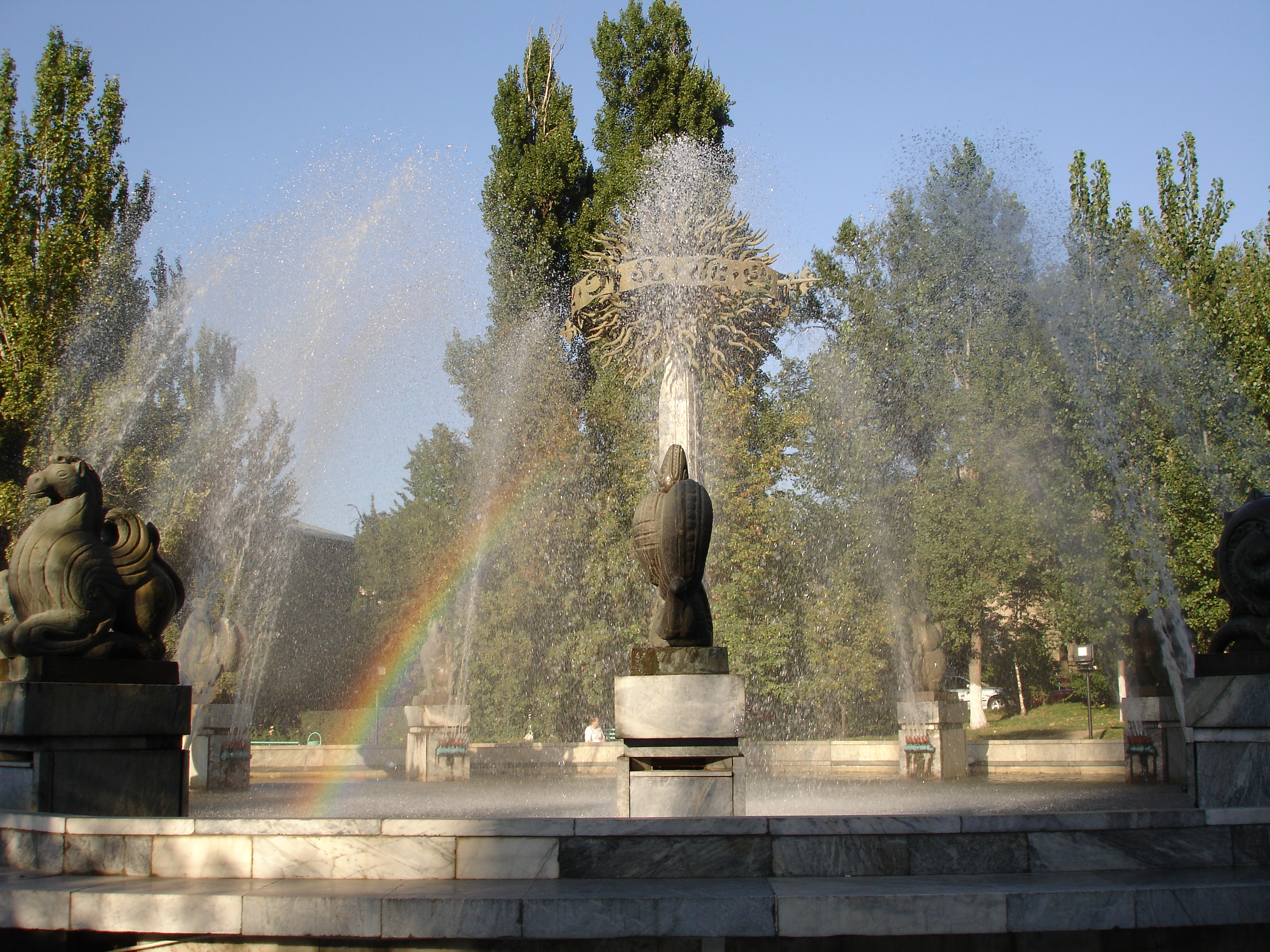
Fountain "Oriental Calendar" in front of the Academy of Sciences of the Republic of Kazakhstan

- Fountains in the park near the bust of D.A. Kunayev
- Fountains at the monument to Dzhambul on Dostyk Ave.
- Fountains at the Hotel "Kazakhstan", northwest side Fountains at the Hotel "Kazakhstan", South side
- Fountain "Oriental Calendar" in front of the Academy of Sciences of the Republic of Kazakhstan
- Fountain "Semirechye" on Tulebayev St., below Abay Avenue.
- Fountains in front of the Palace of the Republic
- Fountain in front of the Museum of the Republic
- Two symmetrical fountains "Mushroom" in front of the city administration building
- Fountain in front of the Kazakh State Philharmonic at Zhambyl at 35, Kaldayakov str.
- Fountains in the Park of Culture and Recreation. Fountain in the center of the pond, "Neptune" fountain, fountain in Greco-Roman theme.

=== Almaly district ===
- Fountain in front of the Kazakhconcert building on Ablaykhan Ave.
- Fountain in front of the Akku Cafe on Panfilov Street
- Fountains in front of the former Government House on Astana Square (East side)
- Fountains in front of the former Government House on Astana Square (North side)
- Fountains in front of the Lermontov Russian Drama Theater
- Fountains in front of the Abay Opera and Ballet Theatre (North side)
- Fountain "Nedelka"
- Fountain "Cascades" (East side) of the Abay Opera and Ballet Theatre
- Fountains near the G. Musrepov Theater for Children and Youth on Ablaykhan Ave.
- Fountains near the monument to Chokan Valikhanov
- Fountain near the Wedding Palace on Abay Avenue
- Fountains "Mother and Child" near the Kazdramteatr building named after M.Auezov
- Fountain at 59 Shevchenko St., corner of Bayseitova St.
- Fountain near the Kazakh-British Technical University on Tole-bi Street, corner of Panfilov Street

=== Bostandyq district ===
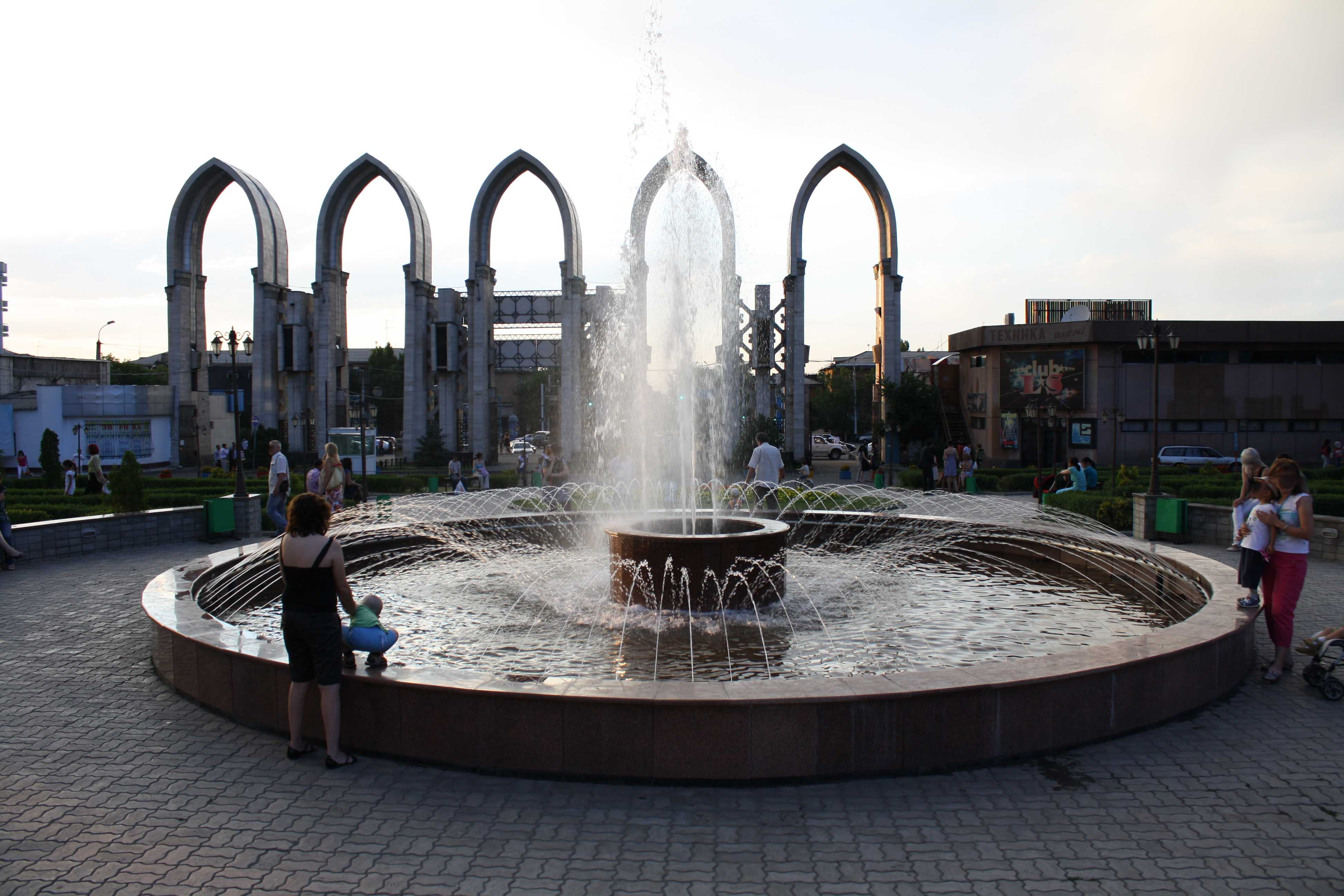
Fountain in the main square of the Atakent Business Cooperation Center

- Fountain on Republic of Kazakhstan Square
- Cascade fountain on Kulash Baiseitova Street below the square
- Fountain in the "Orbita-III" microdistrict near the Baikonur cinema
- Fountain in the main square of the Atakent Business Cooperation Center
- Two fountains in front of the Palace of Students of Kazakh National University
- Fountain in front of the MEGA Alma-Ata mall
- Fountain at the entrance to the Park of the First President
- "Singing Fountain" in the Park of the First President of the Republic of Kazakhstan

=== Turksib district ===
- The fountain "Tabigat" in the Park named after S. С. Seyfullin Park
- Fountain in front of the Turksib District Akimat building
