= Son (1955 film) =

- German poster
- Russian: Сын
- Directed by: Yuri Ozerov
- Written by: Tatyana Sytina
- Produced by: Valentin Maslov
- Starring: Leonid Kharitonov; Pyotr Konstantinov; Varvara Kargashova; Viktor Geraskin; Nadezhda Rumyantseva
- Cinematography: Igor Slabnevich
- Edited by: Yekaterina Karpova
- Music by: Yuriy Levitin
- Production company: Mosfilm
- Release date: 1955
- Running time: 92 min.
- Country: Soviet Union
- Language: Russian

Son (Russian: Сын, romanized: Syn) is a 1955 Soviet drama film directed by Yuri Ozerov.

== Plot ==
Senior pupil Andrei Goryaev is facing criminal liability for criminal misconduct. A compassionate witness regrets a young man, and he is released. Having quarreled with his father, Goriaev leaves the house and wanders around the capital until he accidentally finds himself in a new district of Moscow: at the construction site in Cheryomushki.

== Cast ==
- Leonid Kharitonov as Andrey Goryaev
- Pyotr Konstantinov as Goryaev's father
- Varvara Kargashova as Goryaev's mother
- Viktor Geraskin as Vasya Kozlov
- Nadezhda Rumyantseva as Tamara
- Konstantin Sorokin as Panechkin
- Alexey Gribov as Kondratiev
- Vladimir Belokurov as Lavrov
- Roza Makagonova as Shura
- Aleksandr Mikhaylov as Volodya
- Klyon Protasov as policeman
- Pavel Vinnik as Shibykin
- Ada Vojtsik as Vasya's mother
- Nina Doroshina as saleswoman
- Vladimir Zemlyanikin as Starostin
- Yuri Belov as escort policeman
- Konstantin Bartashevich as school director

== Release ==
Yuri Ozerov's film in the Soviet box office was watched by 28.3 million viewers, which is the 450th result for the whole history of the hire in the USSR.
