= After the Wedding =

After the Wedding may refer to:

- After the Wedding (1962 film), a Soviet film directed by Mikhail Yershov
- After the Wedding (2006 film), a Danish film directed by Susanne Bier
- After the Wedding (2019 film), an American remake of the 2006 film, directed by Bart Freundlich
