= Aleksandr Khanov =

Soviet actor (1904–1983)

- Александр Ханов
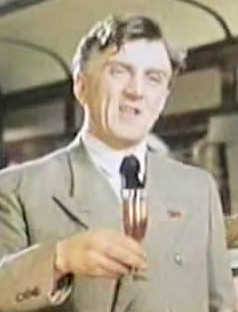
- Born: 12 May [O.S. 29 April] 1904; Saint Petersburg, Russian Empire
- Died: 30 August 1983 (aged 79); Moscow, Russian SFSR, Soviet Union
- Occupation: Actor
- Years active: 1922–1979

Aleksandr Aleksandrovich Khanov (Note: Russian: Александр Александрович Ханов, romanized: Aleksandr Aleksandrovich Khanov) (12 May [O.S. 29 April] 1904 – 30 August 1983) was a Soviet and Russian stage and film actor. People's Artist of the USSR (1973). He was born in Saint Petersburg and died in Moscow.

== Awards ==
- Two Stalin Prizes first degree (1941, 1947)
- Stalin Prize second degree (1949).
- People's Artist of the USSR (1973)

== Filmography ==
- Minin and Pozharsky (1939) – Kuzma Minin – Stalin Prizes first degree (1941)
- Suvorov (1941) – Platonych
- The Train Goes East (1947) – Dining car passenger (uncredited)
- The Fall of Berlin (1950) – Nikolai Aleksandrovich Bulganin
- Far from Moscow (1950) – Kuzma Kuzmich Topolev
- Silvery Dust (1953) – Charles Armstrong
- May Stars (1959) – General Sergei
- The Salvos of the Aurora Cruiser (1965) – Ambassador
- Royal Regatta (1966) – Aleksei Ivanovich, Vasya's grandfather
- Late Flowers (1970) – Nikifor the valet
- The Polynin Case (1970) – Balakirev Sr.
- The Humpbacked Horse (1975 version) – Miracle Fish-whale (voice)
