= Kulyash Baiseitova =

Soviet-Kazakh opera singer (1912–1957)

Kulyash Baiseitova Күләш Бәйсейітова
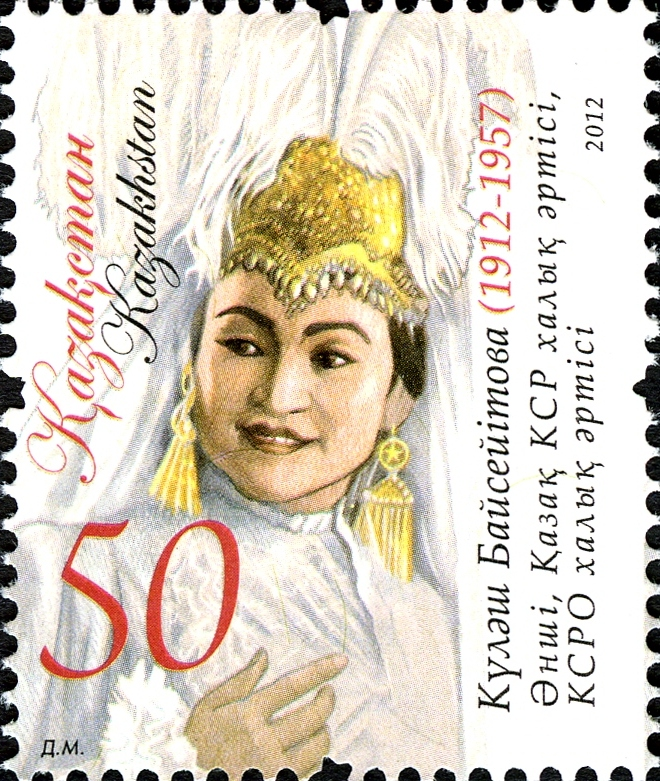
- Baiseitova on a 2012 Kazakh stamp

Background information
- Born: Gülbahram Baiseitova; May 2, 1912; Zhanaortalik, Russian Empire (present-day Narmanbet, Kazakhstan)
- Died: June 6, 1957 (aged 45) Moscow, Russian SFSR, Soviet Union
- Occupations: Singer, actress

Küläş Jasynqyzy Baiseiıtova (Note: Often transliterated as Kulyash Zhasymovna Baiseitova through a Russified Romanization of Куляш Жасымовна Байсеитова.) (Kazakh: Күләш Жасынқызы Байсейітова; born Gülbahram, (Note: Kazakh: Гүлбаһрам; Russian: Гульбахрам, romanized: Gulbakhram) 1912 – 1957) was a Soviet and Kazakh opera singer and actress. People's Artist of the USSR (1936).

== Biography ==
Kulyash Baiseitova (maiden name Beisova) was born on 2 May (19 April) 1912 (according to other sources – 12 January) in the steppes of Sary-Arka, in the village Zhanaortalik of the Karkaraly district of the Semipalatinsk Oblast (now in the Aktogay district of the Karaganda Region of Kazakhstan (According to official data in the city of Verny (now Almaty). She was born to a very simple family: mother Zibazhan, a washerwoman, father Zhasyn, a shoemaker. Her birth name was Gulbakhram; Kulya – her childhood nickname – gradually turned into the name Kulyash. Her parents were so broke that they could not feed two children. Therefore, Gulbakhram was sent to an orphanage even before school.

No matter how difficult it was for the parents, they decided to take the girl from the orphanage and send her to a boarding school. She was brought to Alma-Ata at the age of twelve, and for some time, she lived in a boarding school.

=== Path to art ===
Baiseitova's natural musical talent emerged early. She memorized and performed songs, zhyrys and kyssas, heard from father Zhasyn. Her father was a good singer when he was young and sang around the country. Kanabek Baiseitov, Kulyash's husband wrote about it in his book:

“His father Zhasyn was a great singer. He used to perform with the famous Aset and Baluan Sholak".

In her autobiography, Kulyash wrote:

“... When I was in school, I participated in a drama club. When the Kazdramteater moved to Alma-Ata in 1929, I wanted to enter this theatre, but some comrades spread rumours that my father was a rich man and that I should be expelled from the Komsomol. Despite these false statements, I achieved my goal and entered the theatre, but only in 1933 I began to be nominated and began to play the main roles...."

Once, people came to the school from the Kyzyl-Orda Drama Theater, which was on tour in Alma-Ata. They were looking for children with perfect pitch and voice to participate in the performance. Thus, Kulyash first began performing on stage.

In 1925 her father left home, leaving his family. 13-year-old Kulyash cannot come to terms with the idea that she is fed, goes to school, and her family is starving at home. She decides to leave the boarding school and live at home; she went to school and received a scholarship(18 rubles). Over time, she decided that she needed to quit school and feed her family. She is arranged as an apprentice in an office and is trained to be a clerk. At the same time in 1925–1928, she studied at the Almaty Pedagogical College of the Institute of Education (Russian: Института просвещения), actively participated in amateur music performances, and she began to achieve success in the theater.

In 1930 she entered the studio of the Kazakh Drama Theater, which was created in the city of Kyzyl-Orda in 1926 and transferred to Alma-Ata in 1929 (now the Kazakh State Academic Drama Theater named after M.O. Auezov;). While studying acting and musical literacy, she played small episodic roles in the theatre and soon the main ones. At that time, the theatrical evening consisted of small plays in the first section and concerts with the participation of singers, instrumentalists, dancers from among the theatre artists in the second. Kulyash performed in both performances and concerts.

In 1933 she became a member of the troupe of the Musical Theater (now the Abay Kazakh State Academic Opera and Ballet Theater), where she performed until the end of her life. She studied singing in the educational studio of the theatre from K. A. Dianti and V. A. Smyslovskaya.

Since 1934 she has been a soloist of the Kazakh Musical Theater (now the Abay Kazakh State Academic Opera and Ballet Theater).

=== Political activity ===
In 1938 she became a deputy of the Supreme Soviet of the Kazakh SSR. She continued her deputy career until the end of her life. She was also a member of the State Prize Committee in 1940 and the Peacekeeping Committee in 1951. Member of the CPSU (b) since 1943. Deputy of the Supreme Soviet of the Kazakh SSR of the 1–3 convocations.

=== Death ===
In June 1957, Baiseitova went to a concert in Moscow. After the concert, complaining of headaches, the singer returned to the hotel. On the morning of 6 June, the maid found her lifeless body in the bathroom. Doctors later diagnosed intracerebral hemorrhage. Buried in Alma-Ata at the Central Cemetery.

== Personal life ==
The singer's maiden name was Beisova. Kulyash married the singer and actor Kanabek Baiseitov and got her husband's surname in 1933. Kanabek Baiseitov is the singer-actor, director, dramatist, one of the founders of the Kazakh Musical Theater (now it's the Kazakh Opera and Ballet Theater), People's Artist of Kazakh SSR (1936), laureate of the State Prize of Kazakhstan.

Kulyash Baiseitova gave birth to three daughters: Kuralai Baiseitova (1938—1974), Karlygash Baiseitova (1940–2023), Karshyga Baiseitova (1942—1947). Kuralai – the eldest daughter died in 1974 at the age of 38. The middle one is Karlygash. Her youngest daughter Karshyga died of food poisoning in kindergarten at the age of five. The death of the youngest daughter was tragic period for the singer. After that, her health deteriorated, and her blood pressure continued to rise. Her sister Raikhan Beisova bore a girl named Raushan in 1947. With the permission of her sister, Kulyash adopted Raushan, gave her her last name. Raushan Baiseitova became a ballet dancer, People's Artist of the Kazakh SSR.

== Creativity ==
Her attraction to the arts was evident from childhood. The singer's father, Jasyn, was also a singer and spent much time singing and celebrating among the community. Although her father's interest did not bring income to the family, her father turned to other activities but did not forget the singing. It was the motivation for little Kulyash and opened for her an interest in this art..

During her studies, she showed an interest in the theatre, and she wanted to express herself in singing. But due to being expelled and falsely accused, she began to lose hope in her career. But she got noticed in the theatre when she and another actor began to play. After this case, her career took off.

She was 16 years old when she moved from Kyzyl-Orda to the big city Almaty. The actress's role in "My life is my art" was a big step for Kulyash Baisetova. Kulyash, who originally appeared in productions on crowd scenes with small minor roles, in a year or two showed her artistic skills and took her place among the outstanding actors of the theatre.

When the Kazakh theatre moved to Alma-Ata in 1929, she wanted to join the theatre, but some comrades spread rumours that her father was a rich man and that she should be expelled from the Komsomol. Despite these falsehoods, she got her way and entered the theatre in 1930.

This theatre is known today as the M.O. Auezov Kazakh State Academic Drama Theatre. Trained as an actor and musician, she played small episodic roles in the theatre and soon became the main actress.

For the first time on the Kazakh opera stage, K. Baiseitova performed the classical repertoire: Tatiana, Tamara, Cio-Cio-San. She also performed as a concert singer. She performed Kazakh and Russian folk songs, works by Russian, Soviet and Western European composers. Baiseitova had a natural talent for music early on. She memorized and performed songs, zhyry and kyssa, which she heard from her father – Jasyn.

In 1933 K.Baiseitova joined the troupe of Musical theatre (nowadays the State Academic theatre of opera and ballet named after Abay) where she performed till the end of her life. The musical and stage talent of Baisseitova vividly manifested itself in the image of Aiman in a musical comedy of Auezov and I.V.Kotsyk "Aiman – Sholpan". The image of Shuga ("Shuga" by Mailin and Kotsyk) is the evidence of growing singer's skill; the role of Zhibek ("Kyz Zhibek" by Yevgeniy Brusilovskiy) enables the singer to reach the heights of classic opera, creating a whole gallery of characters.

Professional vocalists D. Dianti, Z. Pisarenko and others worked on staging Kulyash's voice. Starting with the performance Shuga after the play by B. Mailin, Kulyash sings in a high voice. She has consciously retained her affinity with the folk manner of singing – with an open voice. Kulyash's talent made it possible to combine the traditions of the Russian vocal school and the national features of singing in organic synthesis.

Success came to the singer in 1933 with the first production of the musical comedy "Aiman-Sholpan", where she sang as a lead character on the stage of the State Music Studio. The republic learned a new name – Kulyash, and the people, ahead of official recognition, gave her their "title" – the Kazakh Nightingale! And soon after, in 1934, the singer got her first honorary title, Honored Artist of the Kazakh SSR

The staging of the first Kazakh opera "Kyz-Zhibek" by E. Brusilovsky created specifically for Kulyash Baiseitova was a truly historic event in the Kazakh musical culture.

The programme lists it as folk music arranged by E. Brusilovsky. The music of the first Kazakh opera (it contained over 50 folk songs and cues) was selected by its first performers. Kulyash was one of them. Thanks to that very character – an unsurpassable Kyz-Zhibek – Kulyash conquered Moscow during the days of the Decade of Kazakh Art in 1936. Composer Brusilovsky wrote in his memoirs how once the three of them – Kulyash, her husband Kanabek Baiseitov and he in a cart loaded with hay – were returning from the village where they gave a concert. Kulyash, as always, was humming something. At one point she started to sing "ga-a", and then the cart bounced on a bump. The singer, almost biting her tongue, exhaled "k-ku-u-u". Brusilovsky, tormented at this time over the final aria of the heroine, instantly inflamed. This is how the famous "Gakku" – Zhibek's lament for the fallen Tulegen – appeared. People listened to it and wept, and Kulyash confessed that each performance cost her a year of her life.

Kulyash Bayseitova was named People's Artist of the USSR and received the Stalin Prize when she was just 24. It happened after Stalin, who heard Kulyash's wonderful lyric-coloratura soprano singing during the First Decade of Kazakh Art in Moscow, called her the "Kazakh nightingale".

People's memories to this day retain images of Kyz-Zhibek, Khadisha, Akzhunus, Azhar and Sary, created by Kulyash. Through Kulyash, Kazakh people became acquainted with classic opera heroines for the first time and grew to love them. As the singer herself said, when creating the roles of Kyz-Zhibek, Akzhunus, Khadisha or Maro in "Daisi" opera, or Butterfly in "Cio-Cio-San", or Tatyana in "Eugene Onegin", she was always singing about a man and his feelings.

"...When we listened to Cio-Cio-San performed by Kulyash, we were not hampered by our lack of knowledge of the Kazakh language. It seemed that we understood not only the general idea expressed by the actress, but also each word she uttered. The state of Cio-Cio-San was so vividly expressed in the artist's facial expressions and intonations", - from the director A. Troitskiy's manuscript "Legacy of Kulyash Baiseitova".

Many people have another memory of her immersion in a role. She sang the role of Maro in the Georgian opera "Daisi". As contemporaries recalled, it was impossible to listen to the aria "Maro's Lament" over the body of her beloved in the last act without emotional trembling. This lament, like Chopin's funeral march, became for many years a symbol of farewell to a man who had left his mark on the history of the republic. And Georgian colleagues, having heard about the success of Daisi in Kazakhstan, invited Kulyash to take part in the performance staged in Tbilisi, the motherland of this opera. She sang her part in Kazakh, and her partners answered in Georgian. When she returned from Tbilisi she told her mother: "Tate, when I went on stage, my hands and feet were trembling. I was afraid of falling out of tune... But after the performance, the audience carried me out of the hall in their arms". "Strange and eerie state experienced, perhaps, not one of me, when the civil funeral service in the theatre at the last send-off Kuliash sounded "Crying Maro". It seemed that Kuliash's big expressive portrait comes to life, and it was as if she was about to make corrections in her performance of "The Crying Maro".

In the opera Eugene Onegin, Kulyash-Tatiana wrote the letter in bed, turning away from the orchestra and the audience. Not once did she make a mistake and not once did she stumble. Directed by Y. Zavadsky, seeing this scene, was surprised and reiterated many times, that this Tatiana he had never heard and never seen! Kulyash is a talented singer and a great actress", he said with admiration. Nowadays the works based on the archival records of the State Central Archives of Cinema and Photo Documents of the Republic of Kazakhstan and Kazakh Radio are widely known, which give an idea of the multifaceted talent of Kulyash – as a performer of dramatic plays (music of L. Khamidi to the play "Jambul"), operas – Kazakh (E. Brusilovsky "Kyz-Zhibek", "Er-Targyn", "Zhalbyr", A. Zhubanov and others). Zhubanov, L. Khamidi "Abay", M. Tulebayev "Birzhan and Sara") and world classics (Z. She performs folk songs (the Kazakh "Yeligai", "Shili Ozen", the Russian "Kolokolchik", the Polish "She was a maiden", the Czech "Pastushok", the Armenian "Swallow"), as well as works by Kazakh composers, written especially for Kulyash (E. Brusilovsky "Rokhtar kosher", A. Rubanov and B. Savinstein). Brusilovsky "Qos karlygash", L. Khamidi "Bul-bul", "Saira".

== Titles and awards ==
- Honored Artist of the Kazakh SSR (1934)
- People's Artist of the USSR (1936)
- Stalin Prize of the second degree (1948) – for concert and performing activities
- Stalin Prize of the second degree (1949) – for the performance of the main role in the opera "Birzhan and Sara" by Mukan Tulebayev
- Order of the Red Banner of Labour (1936)
- Order of Lenin (1945)
- Medal "For Valiant Labour in the Great Patriotic War 1941–1945"

== Legacy ==
The State Prize of the Kazakh SSR, named after K. Baiseitova, was established.

Streets in Almaty, Taldykorgan, Nur-Sultan, Balkhash, Temirtau and the National Opera and Ballet Theater in Nur-Sultan are named after her.

Every year in Kazakhstan, a vocal competition named after K. Baiseitova is held, which opened in 2008.

To preserve the heritage of Kulyash Baiseitova, discs with all the recordings of the singer, restored and digitized, were released. Her belongings are kept in state museums.

A magazine was published in Almaty entirely dedicated to the singer and her family.

in 2004, director Murat Musin at the Kazakhfilm film studio shot the film "Aul Kulyash" describing her life.

On 15 September 2011, in the square of the K. Baiseitova musical boarding school for gifted children, on the eve of the 100th anniversary of the singer's birth, a bronze monument to Kulyash Baiseitova was erected in Almaty. The opening of the monument took place as part of the celebration of the 20th anniversary of the Independence of the Republic of Kazakhstan.

In the year of the anniversary of the outstanding singer, solemn events were held throughout the republic. On 11 April 2012, in the temple of the National Archives of the Republic of Kazakhstan in Nur-Sultan, a solemn event dedicated to the 100th anniversary of Kulyash Zhasynkyzy Baiseitova's birth was held under the name "Kulyash – the nightingale of the century." This event was organized by the Culture minister and Information of the Republic of Kazakhstan, the National Archives of the Republic of Kazakhstan, the National Opera and Ballet Theater named after K. Baiseitova and the Republican Council of Women of Astana.

On 12 October 2012, a music festival dedicated to the 100th anniversary of the USSR People's Artist, laureate of the USSR State Prize Kulyash Baiseitova took place. In the singer's homeland, in Karaganda, which brought together the giants of the opera stage from Kazakhstan, Russia, Azerbaijan, raised the bar to the international level. The musical festival "Kazakh Gokkuі – Kulush" was held in the concert hall "Shalkyma". It was attended by Kazakh performers, including the People's Artist of the Republic of Kazakhstan, Laureate of the Republican Competition named after K. Baiseitova Nurzhamal Usenbaeva, Dina Khamzina, Medet Chotabaev, Zhupar Gabdullina, and others, as well as Viktor Aleshkov from Russia and Ilah Efendiev from Azerbaijan. The festival program was conducted by the Honored Art Worker of Kazakhstan, musicologist Yuri Aravin.

At the beginning of 2013, in Uralsk(Oral) and Moscow, a series of famous producer and TV presenter Bayan Yessentaeva was shot. The series, called "Kulyash Baiseitova", was about the life of the legendary opera singer. It was a new project of the Khabar Agency.
