= Yuri Ozerov (director) =

Soviet film director

- Юрий Озеров
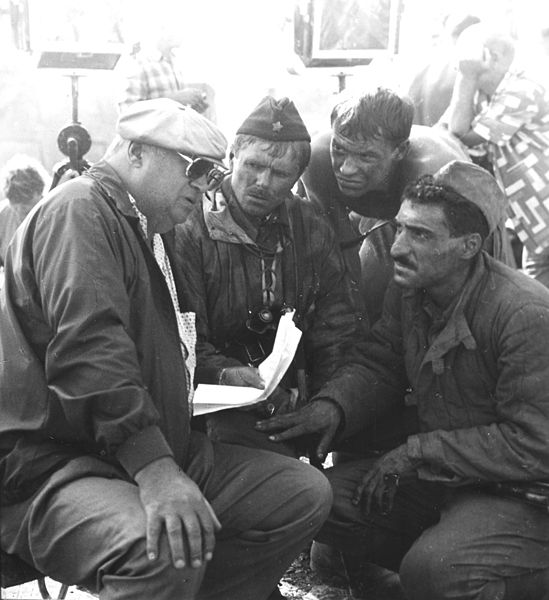
- From left to right: Ozerov, Oleg Uryumtsev, Fedor Bondarchuk and Tigran Keosayan in 1987, during the filming of Stalingrad (1989)
- Born: 26 January 1921; Moscow, Russian SFSR
- Died: 16 October 2001 (aged 80); Moscow, Russia
- Occupations: Film director; screenwriter
- Years active: 1950–1995
- Notable work: Liberation (1969–1971)
- Title: People's Artist of the USSR (1977)

Yuri Nikolayevich Ozerov (Russian: Юрий Николаевич Озеров; 26 January 1921 – 16 October 2001) was a Soviet-Russian film director and screenwriter. He directed twenty films between 1950 and 1995. Ozerov's works won him many awards, among them the title People's Artist of the USSR which was conferred upon him in 1977.

== Biography ==
=== Early life ===
Ozerov was born to Nikolai Nikolayevich Ozerov and Nadezhda Ozerova. His mother, a student of the All-Union State Institute of Cinematography, had to leave her studies when she became pregnant. Ozerov's father was an acclaimed opera singer who was awarded the title People's Artist of the Russian SFSR in 1937 and taught in the Moscow Conservatory. His brother, also named Nikolai, was a tennis champion and sports commentator.

After graduating from high school, Ozerov enrolled for the Lunacharsky State Institute of Theatre Arts in September 1939. A month later, he was drafted into the Red Army, where he was trained as a signaler. When Germany invaded the Soviet Union, he held the rank of a Second Lieutenant. Ozerov participated in the Battle of Moscow and in the campaigns for Ukraine and Poland. In 1944, he underwent a staff officers' course in the Frunze Academy. While stationed in the 3rd Belorussian Front, he took part in the Battle of Königsberg as a forward observation officer. In a 2001 interview, he told that the battle had a profound effect on him and he swore that if he will remain alive, he would "tell the story of the great army that fought in the war." After the German surrender in May, Ozerov served in the occupied city until his discharge in October 1945, with the rank of a Major. During the war, Ozerov married a nurse, Raisa Sukhomlina, with whom he had a son, Vladimir. The two later divorced.

=== Breakthrough ===
Soon after demobilization, Ozerov resumed his studies in the Lunacharsky Institute. In 1947, he entered the All-Union Cinematography Institute, where he studied together with Aleksandr Alov, Marlen Khutsiev, Sergei Parajanov and other future Soviet directors. During the same year, he joined the Communist Party. In 1949 he started working as an assistant-director in the Mosfilm studio. While still a student, he made his debut film, Alexander Pushkin, in 1950. He graduated a year later.

In the beginning of his career, Ozerov directed several documentaries: in 1952, he made the film In the Nikitsky Botanical Garden about the eponymous garden. During 1953, together with Sergei Gurov, he co-directed Arena of the Bold, which presented a live performance by the Soviet Union's young circus artists and starred Oleg Popov, among others. In 1954, he made At the Gala Evening, showing a concert at the Bolshoi Theater.

Ozerov's first major feature film was the 1955 Son, revolving around the life of a delinquent youth in Moscow. In 1957, he directed the adventure film Kochubey, about the last days of the Civil War Cossack hero, Ivan Kochubey. The film, Ozerov's only one to be produced by Lenfilm, received the Prize for Best Musical Score in the 1959 All-Union Film Festival. In the same year, Ozerov first participated in an international production: the Albanian-Soviet film Fortuna, which he co-directed with Kristaq Dhamo. Fortuna was also his first film about the Second World War, dealing with the Albanian partisans' struggle and starring Naim Frashëri. In 1962, he directed the Soviet-Czechoslovak co-production The High Road, a biographical film on Jaroslav Hašek with Josef Abrhám as the main protagonist.

In addition to his cinematic work, Ozerov was also a Major in the KGB's Seventh Directorate, the department responsible for surveillance. He served as a technical officer. In early 1962, the KGB was monitoring Oleg Penkovsky. Miniature cameras were installed in flower pots on his apartment's window sills. The surveillance team suspected that Penkovsky discovered the cameras and was evading them. Ozerov had personally inspected the house and decided to place other equipment in the balcony above the apartment. Penkovsky was caught and executed during 1963.

=== Summit ===
During the mid-1960s, Ozerov - who was awarded the title 'Honored Artist of the RSFSR' in 1965 - was dismayed by several World War II films made in the West, which he regarded as diminishing the role of the Red Army. At the same time, the Soviet authorities were planning a film in response to The Longest Day that would present the official Soviet narrative on the war. Ozerov was selected to direct the new project, the five-part series Liberation, for which he co-wrote the script. The filming lasted more than four years, from 1967 to 1971. Ozerov had to cope both the tight political supervision of the Soviet establishment and with the technical difficulties of coordinating the battle scenes, that involved 150 tanks and thousands of soldiers. Ozerov's second wife, Dilara, was the films' costumes designer. For his work on Liberation, he received the Lenin Prize and the Tbilisi All-Union Film Festival Grand Prize at 1972.

Ozerov directed the first part of the documentary Visions of Eight on the Munich Olympics, entitled The Beginning. Visions of Eight won the 1973 Golden Globe Award for the Best Documentary Film. In 1974, he was given the title of a People's Artist of the RSFSR.

In 1977, Ozerov directed the ten-hour-long mini-series Soldiers of Freedom, theatrically released as two 220 minutes feature films, a co-production that involved most of the Eastern Bloc European countries and dealt with the exploits of their contemporary leaders, especially Leonid Brezhnev, during the Second World War. He was granted the title People's Artist of the USSR in the same year, and was a member in the jury of the 30th Cannes Film Festival and the 10th Moscow International Film Festival.

In 1979, Ozerov was selected to be the chief of the Moscow 1980 Olympics Artistic Committee. He directed a series of documentary films dedicated to the games: Ballad of Sport, Farewell to the Olympics, The Olympic Holidays and O, Sport - You're the World. For this accomplishment, he was awarded the USSR State Prize in 1981.

In 1985, Ozerov directed another large-scale World War II production, the Battle of Moscow, released for the 40th Anniversary of Victory Day. The film received the 1986 All-Union Film Festival Grand Prize.

=== Later years ===
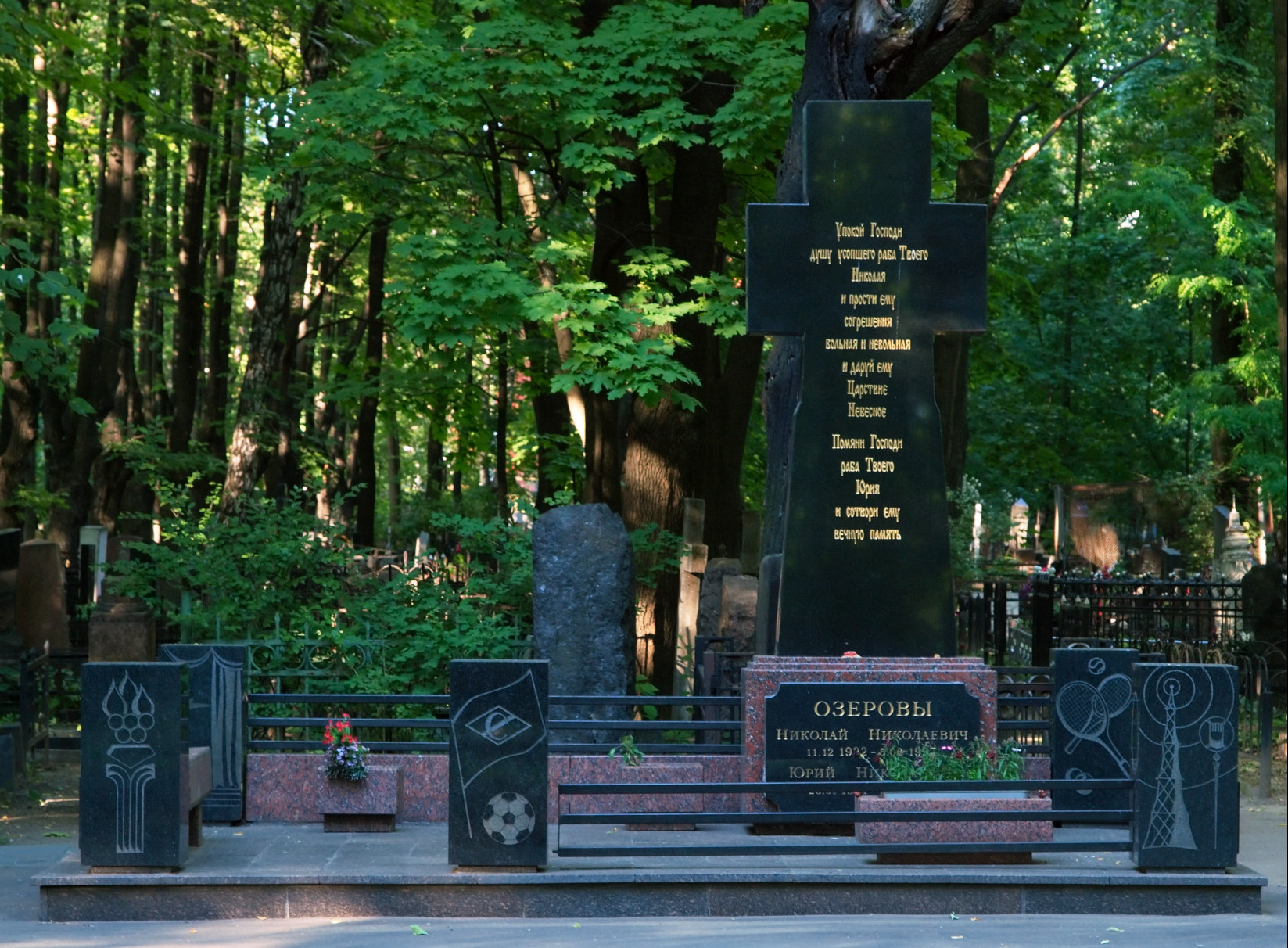
Nikolai and Yuri Ozerov's tombstone.

In 1989, Ozerov decided to direct one more World War II film, Stalingrad. Due to the economical situation in the Soviet Union, he had to approach the Warner Bros. for assistance with the budget. The company agreed, but only on condition that American actors would receive major roles. The reluctant Ozerov had to cast Powers Boothe as General Chuikov.

In 1993, the director used footage from Stalingrad in the film Angels of Death, that presented a sniper duel taking place during the battle for the city. The new footage was filmed in Syria. Selected material from all of Ozerov's works on World War II was compiled to create the historical mini-series Tragedy of the Century. In 1995, Ozerov produced a mini-series, The Great Commander Georgy Zhukov, consisting of all the scenes in his films that included Zhukov - in all of which he was depicted by Mikhail Ulyanov. In 2001, he received the Russian President's award for contribution to national cinema, dying shortly after. He is buried in the Vvedenskoye Cemetery, alongside his younger brother Nikolai.

His widow founded the Yuri Ozerov War Films Festival in his memory.

== Decorations ==
- Order of the Patriotic War, 2nd class (1944)
- Order of the Red Banner (1945)
- Order of the Badge of Honour (1965)
- Order of Lenin (1971, 1981)
- Star of People's Friendship (East Germany, 1972)
- Silver Cross of the Order of Merit of the Republic of Poland (1977)
- Order of the October Revolution (1986)
- Order of Merit for the Fatherland, 3rd class (1996)
- Honoured Artist of the RSFSR (1965)
- Honoured Artist of the Slovak Socialist Republic (1971)
- Honoured Artist of the People's Republic of Poland (1972)
- People's Artist of the RSFSR (1974)
- People's Artist of USSR (1977)
- Honoured Artist of the Czech Socialist Republic (1981)
- Main prize and award of the All-Union Film Festival ("Liberation" movies, 3rd, 4th; 1972)
- Lenin Prize (1972) - the film "Liberation"
- Silver Medals of the Polish-Soviet Friendship Society (1977) - "Liberation" and "Soldiers of Freedom"
- State Prize of the USSR (1982) - as the director of the official film of the Games of the XXII Summer Olympics "O Sport, You are Peace!".
- Main prize of the organizing committee of the All-Union Film Festival (1986) - "Battle of Moscow"
- Dovzhenko Gold Medal (1986) - "Battle of Moscow"
- Russian President's Award for his contribution to the development of national cinema (2001)

== Filmography ==
- Alexander Pushkin (1950)
- Arena of the Bold (1953)
- Son (1955)
- Kochubey (1957)
- Fortune (1959)
- High Road (1962)
- Liberation
  - The Fire Bulge (1970)
  - Breakthrough (1970)
  - The Direction of the Main Blow (1971)
  - Battle of Berlin (1971)
  - The Last Assault (1971)
- Visions of Eight (1973)
- Soldiers of Freedom (1977)
- O, Sport, You - the Peace! (1981)
- Battle of Moscow (1985)
- Stalingrad (1989)
- Tragedy of the Century (1993)
- Angels of Death (1993)
- The Great Commander Georgy Zhukov (1995)
