= Olga Pyzhova =

Russian theatre actress, director, and teacher (1894-1972)

- О́льга Ива́новна Пыжо́ва
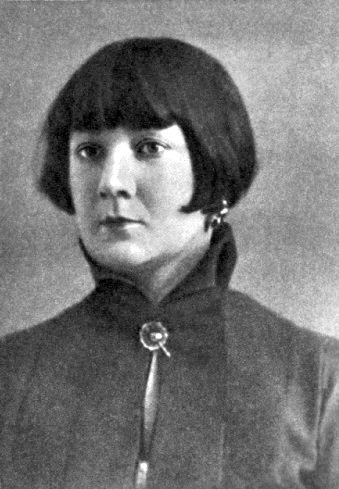
- Pyzhova (1920)
- Born: 29 October 1894; Moscow, Russia
- Died: 7 or 8 November 1972 (aged 78); Moscow, Russia
- Occupation: Stage actress
- Spouse: Boris Bibikov
- Children: 1

Olga Ivanovna Pyzhova (29 October 1894, Moscow—7 or 8 November 1972, Moscow; О́льга Ива́новна Пыжо́ва) was a Russian stage actress, director, and teacher. She spent her early years with the Moscow Art Theatre before moving to the Revolution Theatre in 1928. She taught and directed at several schools and theatres, including Lunacharsky State Institute for Theatre Arts (GITIS), All-Union State Institute of Cinematography (VGIK), Moscow Central Children's Theater, and Auezov Theater. Her awards included Honored Artist of the RSFSR (1947), People's Artist of the Tatar Autonomous Soviet Socialist Republic (1949), the People's Artist of the Tajik SSR (1964), and a Medal "For Valiant Labour in the Great Patriotic War 1941–1945", as well as a State Stalin Prize in the third degree for her and her husband's production of Sergey Mikhalkov's play I Want to Go Home.

== Biography ==
As a child, Pyzhova lived in the Varkava area of Moscow. She studied at Institute for Noble Maidens but left before finishing to train as an accountant. After her father died, the family moved to St. Petersburg to be nearer her maternal aunts, including Ekaterina. Her aunts introduced her to the world of theatre, inspiring her to become an actress herself. She reached out to MAT director Vladimir Nemirovich-Danchenko, who encouraged her to go to Moscow to audition. She was one of two applicants accepted from a pool of more than 200 for the 1914/1915 season.

Pyzhova became a student of Konstantin Stanislavski at the First Studio, where she appeared as Mirandolina in The Mistress of the Inn, Viola and Sebastian in Twelfth Night (1917), and Golpana in Balladyna (1920), and traveled with the troupe to America to appear as Varya in The Cherry Orchard (1924). By the time she returned to Russia, the First Studio had become the Second Studio under Michael Chekhov. She rejoined but was not cast in the theatre's new productions. She and other company members left in 1928 to join Vsevolod Meyerhold's Revolution Theatre, where she worked until 1938. Her appearances there included as Xenia Travern in Man with a Briefcase (1928), Veronica in Anatoly Glebov's Inga (1929), and Nurse in Romeo and Juliet (1935).

Pyzhova began directing in the 1920s. In the 1930s, as her eyesight began to fail, she became more focused on teaching and directing than on acting and worked variously at Lunacharsky State Institute for Theatre Arts (GITIS), All-Union State Institute of Cinematography (VGIK), Yermolova Theatre, and Vakhtangov State Academic Theatre, among others. By the late 1930s, she was working at the Moscow State Academic Children's Music Theater with her husband, Boris Bibikov. They both trained ethnic minorities in theatre over the duration of their careers, primarily by holding workshops. At GITIS, she managed the Karakalpak, Uzbek, Tatar, Tajik, Lezgin, Turkmen, and Moldovan troupes.

In 1939, she became Russia's first female Professor of Acting. She worked at the Auezov Theater and the Mossovet Theatre during World War II as an actress, director, and teacher. Between 1948 and 1950, she served as artistic director at Moscow Central Children's Theater. She and Bibikov taught acting workshops at VGIK; their students included Vyacheslav Tikhonov, Nonna Mordyukova, Rufina Nifontova Ekaterina Savinova, Svetlana Druzhinina, Maya Bulgakova, Lyubov Sokolova, Leonid Kuravlyov, Tamara Nosova, Sofiko Chiaureli, Yuri Belov, and Yevgeny Tashkov. Two of her students at GITIS were Maya-Gozel Aimedova and Nadezhda Rumyantseva, the latter of which she brought with her to VGIK.

Her awards included Honored Artist of the RSFSR (1947), People's Artist of the Tatar Autonomous Soviet Socialist Republic (1949), the People's Artist of the Tajik SSR (1964), and a Medal "For Valiant Labour in the Great Patriotic War 1941–1945". In 1950, she and Bibikov were also awarded the State Stalin Prize in the third degree for their production of Sergey Mikhalkov's play I Want to Go Home. Her memoir, Призвание (Calling), written with the help of her daughter, was published by Iskusstvo in 1974.

== Personal life ==
Pyzhova and Vasily Kachalov fostered a romantic relationship during his marriage to Nina Litovtseva, who Pyzhova became close to during her time touring America. Her daughter, Olga Vasilievna, was born in 1929; it is disputed whether Kachalov was her father or if she just bore his name. The Olgas remained close with the Kachalovs even after Pyzhova and Vasily's affair ended, so much so that Olga Vasilievna lived with them as a child. Pyzhova later married actor Boris Bibikov. She died in Moscow on 7 or 8 November 1972 and is buried in Novodevichy Cemetery.

== Filmography ==
Film
Date	Film	Role	Ref
1937	Without a Dowry	Kharita Ignatyevna Ogudalova	
1937	The Lonely White Sail	Madame Storozhenko	
1953	Alyosha Ptitsyn Grows Up	Grandmother Olya	
1966	They're Calling, Open the Door	Natalia Ivanovna	

=== Theatre ===
Acting
Date	Play	Role	Company	Note(s)	Ref
	The Blue Bird	Bérylune	Moscow Art Theatre First Studio		
	It Tears Where It Is Thin	Governess of Bieneme	Moscow Art Theatre First Studio		
	The Cricket on the Hearth	Fairy	Moscow Art Theatre First Studio		
1915	The Deluge	Lizzie	Moscow Art Theatre First Studio	Directed by Yevgeny Vakhtangov	
1916	The Story of Lieutenant Ergunoff	Hummingbird/Kolibri	Moscow Art Theatre First Studio	Directed by A. Krasnopolska	
1917	Twelfth Night	Viola/Sebastian	Moscow Art Theatre First Studio	Directed by Yevgeny Vakhtangov	
1920	Balladyna	Goplana	Moscow Art Theatre First Studio	Directed by Yevgeny Vakhtangov	
1922	Archangel Michael	Lucille	Moscow Art Theatre First Studio		
1924	The Cherry Orchard	Varya	Moscow Art Theatre First Studio	Traveled on the American tour	
1924	The Mistress of the Inn	Mirandolina	Moscow Art Theatre First Studio	Toured in France and America; directed by Konstantin Stanislavski	
1925	Dialogues		Moscow Art Theatre Second Studio		
1926	Evgraf, Adventurer	Dina Kraevich	Moscow Art Theatre Second Studio		
	King of the Square Republic	Katarina Her	Moscow Art Theatre Second Studio		
	In 1825	Varenka	Moscow Art Theatre Second Studio		
1928	Man with a Briefcase	Xenia Travern	Revolution Theatre		
1929	Inga	Veronica	Revolution Theatre		
1934	Personal Life by Solovyov	Lena	Revolution Theatre		
1935	Romeo and Juliet	Nurse	Revolution Theatre	Directed by Aleksey Popov	
	Golgotha	Glafira	Revolution Theatre		
	Street of Joy	Kixi	Revolution Theatre		
1938	Fuenteovejuna		Auezov Theater		
1943	Taming of the Shrew				
1943	Invasion	Talanova	Mossovet Theatre	Co-directed with Boris Bibikov	
	Match Between Two Fires			With Sofia Giatsintova and Mikhail Chevkov	

Directing
Date	Play	Company	Note(s)	Ref
1937	Scapin the Schemer	Moscow Children's Theatre		
1939	Fairy Tale	Moscow Children's Theatre	Co-directed with Boris Bibikov	
1940	Twenty Years Later	Moscow Children's Theatre	Co-directed with Boris Bibikov	
1943	Taming of the Shrew	Auezov Theater	Co-directed with Boris Bibikov	
1943	Invasion	Mossovet Theatre	Co-directed with Boris Bibikov; also played Talanova	
1949	I Want to Go Home	Auezov Theater	Won the USSR State Prize in 1950	
1949	Her Friends	Auezov Theater		
1950	Twenty Years Later	Moscow Central Children's Theater	Co-directed with Boris Bibikov	
	The Snow Queen	Auezov Theater		
