= Yuri Chulyukin =

Soviet film director and screenwriter

- Born: Yuri Stepanovich Chulyukin; November 9, 1929; Moscow, USSR
- Died: March 7, 1987 (aged 57); Maputo, Mozambique
- Resting place: Kuntsevo Cemetery
- Occupations: Film director, screenwriter
- Years active: 1955–1986
- Spouse: Natalya Kustinskaya (1957–1966)
- Awards: People's Artist of the RSFSR

Yuri Stepanovich Chulyukin (Russian: Юрий Степанович Чулюкин; 9 November 1929 – 7 March 1987) was a Soviet film director, screenwriter, actor and songwriter best known for comedy movies. He became a People's Artist of the RSFSR in 1979.

== Biography ==
Chulyukin was born in Moscow to a Bolshoi Theatre director. His mother studied under the famous actor Mikhail Astangov (born Ruzhnikov), and Chulyukin bore a striking resemblance to him which led to speculations inside the artistic circles; according to Chulyukin's first wife Natalya Kustinskaya, this topic was tabooed inside his family.

He studied for an artist at the Central Children's Theatre and headed the amateur theatre at the Moscow Factory of Cinematographic Equipment. In 1956 he graduated from VGIK where he studied film directing under Grigory Alexandrov and Mikhail Chiaureli; he worked briefly in television and made around three dozen documentaries.

In 1958 he started working at Mosfilm and directed his first feature comedy The Unamenables, which turned into one of the 1959 box office leaders (10th place with 31.8 million viewers) and gained the main prize at the 1960 All-Union Film Festival. He cast the leading actress Nadezhda Rumyantseva in his next comedy The Girls which became an even bigger success: with 34.8 million viewers it became the 5th most popular Soviet movie of 1961; for this role Rumyantseva was named the best actress at the Mar del Plata International Film Festival in 1962.

Chulyukin's third comedy Royal Regatta (1966) featured his wife Natalya Kustinskaya in the main role but wasn't as successful as his previous works; she left him shortly after and later claimed this was the main reason he switched from light comedy films to war and children's movies, gaining the Lenin Komsomol Prize in 1979. During 1970–1980s, he worked a lot as a screenwriter as well as an artistic director at the Alania television company (North Ossetia), at the time the center of all filmmaking at the North Caucasus, developing the national movie industry. He also taught at VGIK since 1982. A member of the CPSU since 1956.

Chulyukin died on March 7, 1987, in Maputo (Mozambique) where he was a member of the week of the Soviet cinema. The circumstances preceding the death are still unknown. According to one version, he inadvertently fell into the shaft of the elevator of the hotel. However, according to The Girls actress Inna Makarova he was thrown there by some locals after he had tried to protect the Soviet actress Irina Shevchuk from molesting, but no investigation followed for political reasons.

Chulyukin was buried in Moscow at the Kuntsevo Cemetery.

== Personal life ==
- First wife (1957—1966) – actress Natalya Kustinskaya.
- Second wife (before 1987) — actress Ludmila Chulyukina (née Smirnova).

== Selected filmography ==
Year	Title	Original title			
Year	Title	Original title	Director	Screenwriter	Notes
1955	Smoke in the Forest	Дым в лесу	✓		diploma film, with Yevgeny Karelov
1959	The Unamenables	Неподдающиеся	✓		
1961	The Girls	Девчата	✓		
1962	Strictly Business	Деловые люди			actor, uncredited (Peabody the clerk)
1965	Two in Love	Двое		✓	
1966	Royal Regatta	Королевская регата	✓		
1967	Dubravka	Дубравка		✓	
1969	On the Way to Berlin	На пути в Берлин		✓	
1986	How to Become Happy	Как стать счастливым	✓	✓	
