= Spring Voices =

- Russian: Весенние голоса
- Directed by: Sergei Gurov; Eldar Ryazanov
- Written by: Boris Laskin
- Produced by: Alexey Stefansky
- Starring: Vladimir Salnikov; Nadezhda Rumyantseva; Tigran Davydov
- Cinematography: Vladimir Nikolayev
- Edited by: Ekaterina Ovsyannikova
- Music by: Anatoli Lepin
- Production company: Mosfilm
- Release date: 1955
- Running time: 67 min.
- Country: Soviet Union

Spring Voices (Russian: Весенние голоса, romanized: Vesenniye golosa) is a 1955 Soviet musical film directed by Sergei Gurov and Eldar Ryazanov. First Soviet experimental widescreen revue film.

== Plot ==
A group of students of a vocational school create a TV that demonstrates performances of various creative teams and presents it at the All-Union show of amateur art.

== Cast ==
- Vladimir Salnikov as Vanya (as Volodya Salnikov)
- Nadezhda Rumyantseva as Nina
- Tigran Davydov as Vasya
- Sergei Gurov as episode
- Eldar Ryazanov as episode
