= Eddie Rosner =

German, Polish and Soviet jazz trumpeter and bandleader (1910–1976)

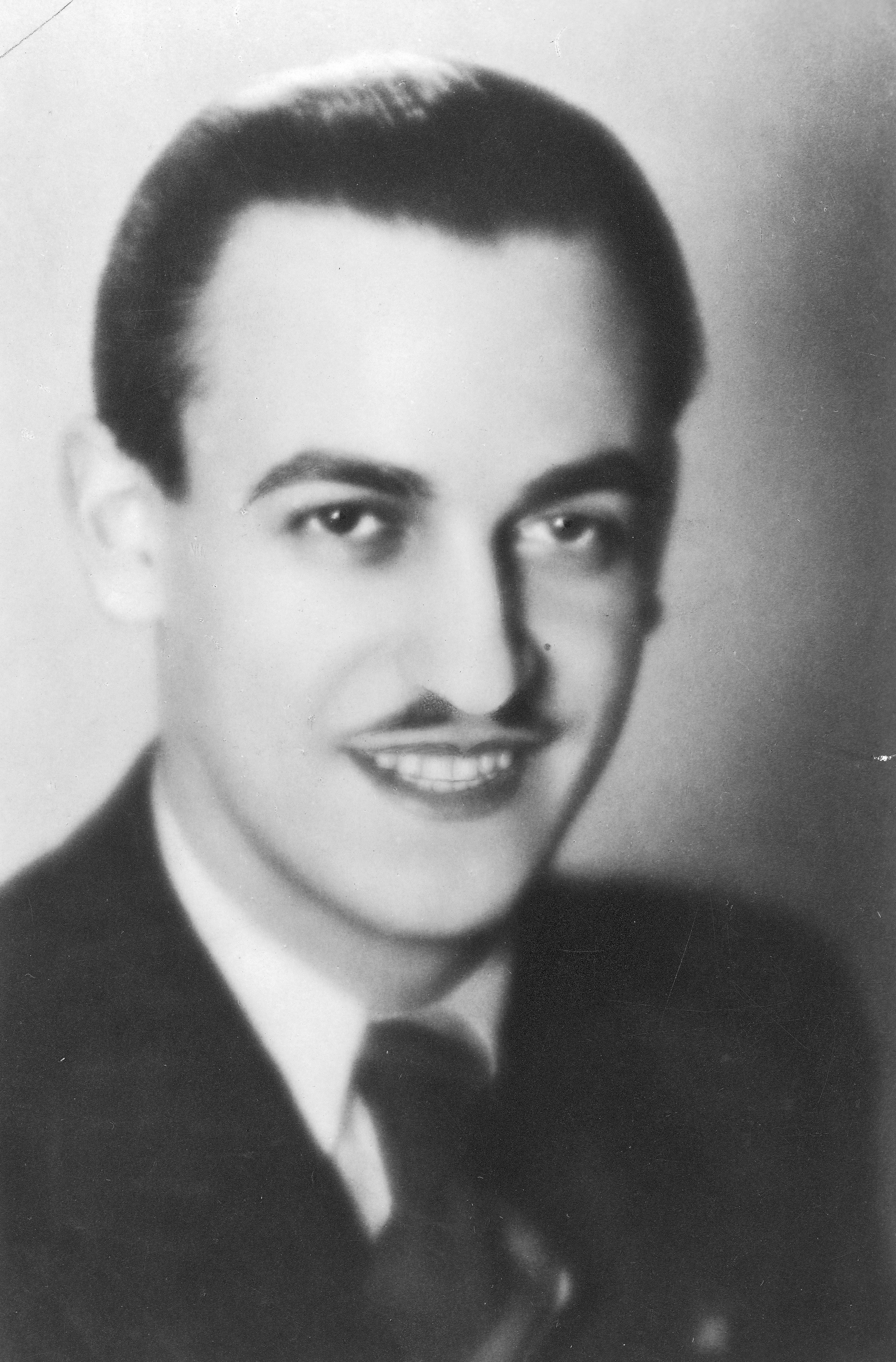
- Rosner in 1936

Background information
- Also known as: Ady Rosner
- Born: Adolf Rosner; May 26, 1910; Berlin, German Empire
- Died: August 8, 1976 (aged 66) West Berlin, West Germany
- Genres: Jazz
- Occupations: Musician; bandleader; composer
- Instruments: Trumpet; violin
- Years active: 1929–1946; 1954–1976
- Labels: Electrola; Syrena; Columbia; Melodiya; Aprelevskiy Zavod

Adolf Rosner (26 May, 1910 – 8 August, 1976), known professionally as Ady Rosner and Eddie Rosner, was a German, Polish and Soviet jazz trumpeter, bandleader, and composer. Known as the White Louis Armstrong, he was one of the most outstanding jazz trumpeters of his generation.

Rosner played a central role in the development of jazz in Poland during the 1930s, promoting it as a modern art form rather than merely dance music. During World War II, he led one of the most successful jazz orchestras in the Soviet Union with official state approval. Despite his wartime prominence, Rosner was arrested in the late 1940s and spent several years in the Gulag. After his release, he resumed performing and recording but never regained his former international standing.

== Biography ==
=== Early life ===
Rosner was born in Berlin to Polish-Jewish parents, Ignacy and Róża Rosner. He began studying the violin at the Stern Conservatory at the age of six and completed his formal studies in 1920. He subsequently undertook courses in conducting and classical music, initially preparing for a career as a classical musician.

During his education, Rosner became acquainted with brass instruments, including the trumpet. Initially, Rosner did not associate his future with jazz, continuing classical musical education and performing occasionally as a soloist. Eventually, however, he decided to pursue a professional career and abandoned his studies. After a short time, he devoted himself entirely to playing the trumpet.

=== Career as a sideman ===
Using the stage name Ady Rosner, he began performing as first trumpeter in Rosa Peters and Marek Weber Orchestra in Hamburg. In 1929, he joined the Weintraub Syncopators, one of Europe's most influential jazz ensembles. With the group, Rosner toured extensively across Europe and performed aboard transatlantic liners such as the New York, travelling between Hamburg and New York City.

During this period, he appeared on soundtracks of several early sound films, including The Blue Angel (1930). He also established contacts with American jazz musicians, corresponding with Gene Krupa. Following the rise of the Nazi Party in Germany, Rosner concluded that returning to Berlin was no longer possible. In Ostend, Rosner met saxophonist Fud Candrix with whom he formed the Jug Band. While touring Italy, he met Louis Armstrong, who reportedly praised his playing – an encounter that contributed to Rosner's enduring nickname.

=== Career as a bandleader ===
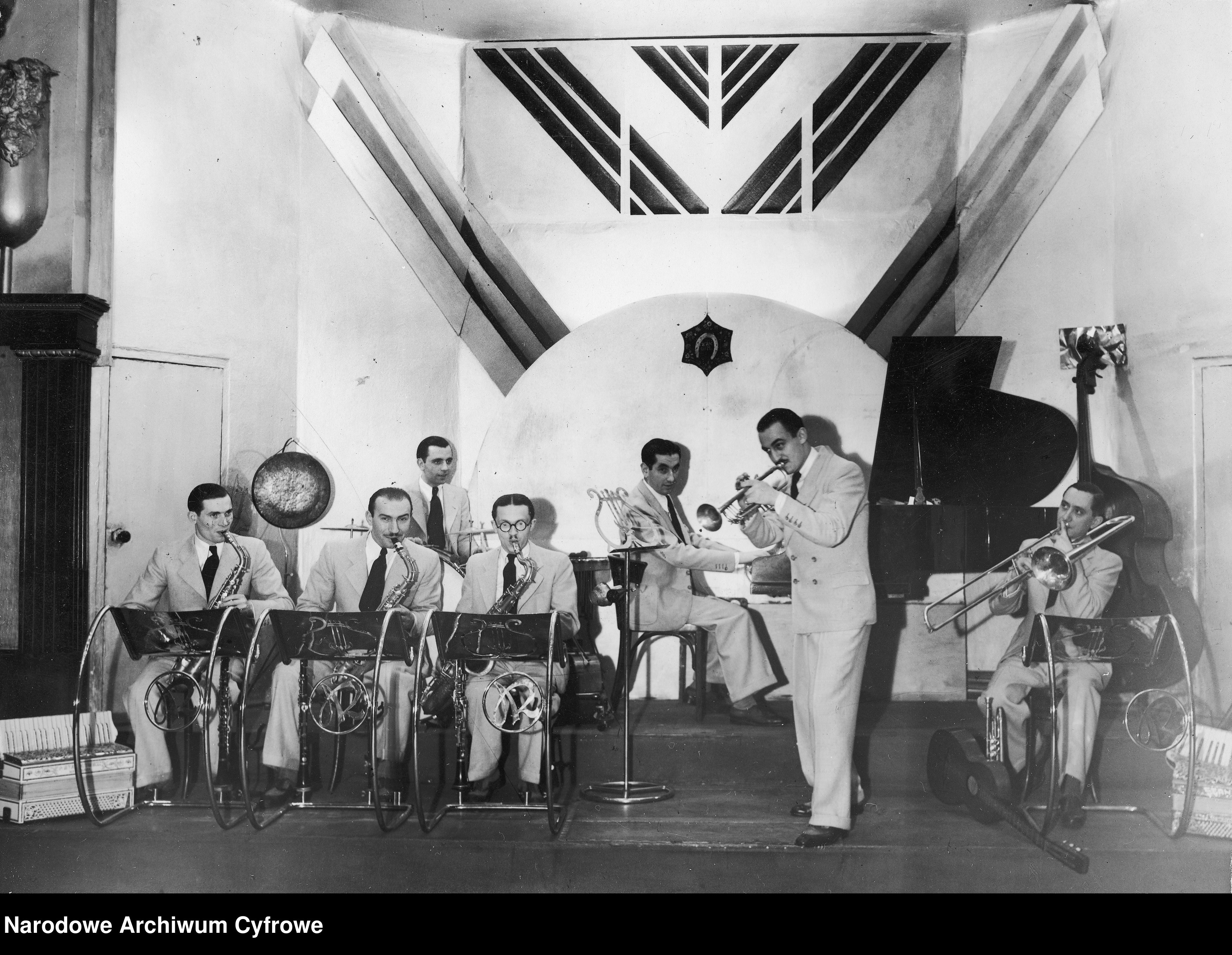
Ady Rosner and his Orchestra in Crackow, circa 1936

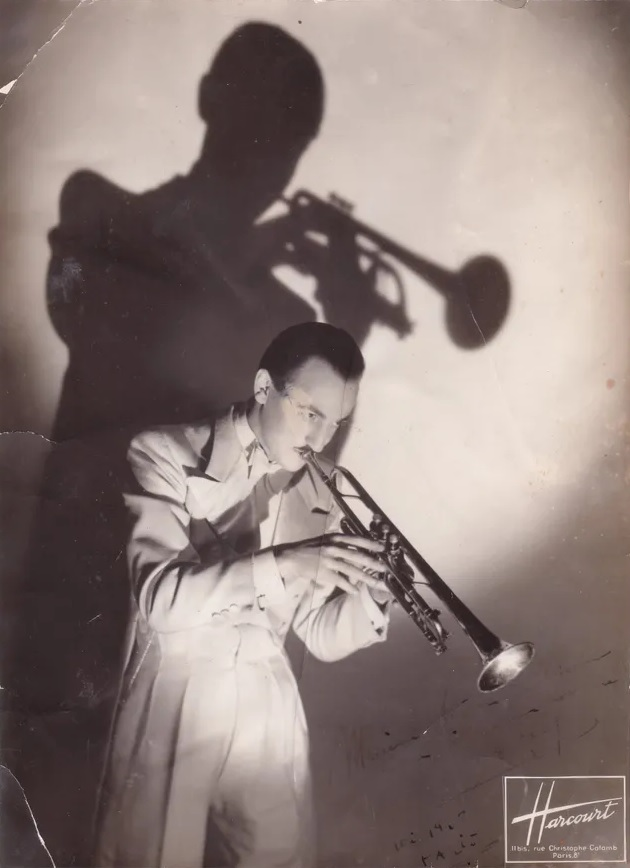
Ady Rosner photographed by Studio Harcourt, circa 1937

In 1933, after being denied permanent residency in Belgium, Rosner settled in Poland, first in Kraków and later in Warsaw, where he formed a modern jazz orchestra modelled on American bands. His ensemble included many of the leading Polish jazz musicians of the interwar era and quickly achieved national prominence. Rosner's performances attracted attention through their innovative approach to jazz, presented as a form of contemporary music intended for attentive listening rather than exclusively for dancing. This had a great influence on the development of the genre in Poland.

The orchestra toured extensively throughout Europe, including appearances in France, Scandinavia, the Benelux countries, and Monte Carlo. While touring Paris in 1938, Rosner recorded eight titles for the French branch of Columbia Records, mostly American jazz standards. These recordings are widely regarded as milestones in the early history of Polish jazz.

=== World War II and the Soviet Union ===
Following the German invasion of Poland in 1939, Rosner and his wife fled east to Białystok, then part of the Byelorussian Soviet Socialist Republic. There, he formed a large jazz ensemble that became known as the State Jazz Orchestra of the Byelorussian SSR. The orchestra received support from Panteleimon Ponomarenko, First Secretary of the Communist Party of Byelorussia. After a performance in Minsk, the ensemble reportedly received favourable attention from Joseph Stalin and became informally known as Stalin's Orchestra. During the war, Rosner's band toured extensively across the Soviet Union, performing for soldiers, party officials, and civilians. Rosner was among the highest-paid musicians in the USSR during this period and travelled with his own train. His success made him one of the most visible jazz musicians in the Soviet Union at a time when jazz was otherwise subject to ideological scrutiny.

In 1946, Rosner was arrested near Lviv by the Ministry for State Security while attempting to cross the border with his family. He was charged with illegal border crossing, conspiracy, and cosmopolitanism and sentenced to ten years in a labour camp. He was imprisoned in camps in the Soviet Far East, including facilities near Magadan and on the Kolyma. Despite the harsh conditions, Rosner was allowed to organise musical ensembles and continued to perform for prisoners and camp officials. He was released in 1954 following the death of Stalin.

=== Later years and legacy ===
After his release, Rosner returned to professional music, forming a jazz orchestra in Moscow. Between 1954 and 1971, he toured widely throughout the Soviet Union and made numerous recordings. In 1956, he appeared with his band in the musical comedy The Carnival Night, which introduced him to a new generation of listeners. Although popular with audiences, Rosner remained subject to official restrictions and was rarely discussed in Soviet music criticism. In the early 1970s, declining health curtailed his activities. In 1973, he was granted permission to leave the Soviet Union and returned to Berlin, where he died in 1976.

Rosner composed music for both Polish and Russian popular songs. His melody for the Polish song Cicha woda, performed by Zbigniew Kurtycz, became a major hit in the 1950s. In 1988, recordings of his Soviet-era work were released as part of Melodiya: Soviet Anthology of Jazz. In 1992, a concert in Moscow reconstructed Rosner's repertoire using original 78-rpm recordings. His life and career were the subject of the documentary film The Jazzman from the Gulag (Le Jazzman du Goulag, 1999), directed by Pierre-Henry Salfati.
