= Tough Nut (film) =

Die hard
- Directed by: Theodor Vulfovich
- Written by: Efraim Sevela
- Starring: Nadezhda Rumyantseva; Vitaly Solomin
- Cinematography: Samouil Rubashkin
- Music by: Mieczysław Weinberg
- Production company: Mosfilm
- Release date: 1967
- Running time: 78 minutes
- Country: Soviet Union
- Language: Russian

Tough Nut (Russian: Крепкий орешек, romanized: Krepkiy oreshek, lit. 'Tough nut', [ˈkrɛpkʲɪj ɐˈrɛɕʲɪk]), also known as Die Hard by some English-speakers due to the name of the popular action film franchise using the same title in Russia, is a 1967 Soviet comedy war film directed by Theodor Vulfovich.

The film's title is a pun on the word nut in Russian (Russian: Орешек, romanized: Oreshek) — as the lead character's last name is Oreshkina.

== Plot ==
After an injury, Lieutenant Ivan Groznykh (Vitaly Solomin) is appointed commander of the women's air defense unit. Among his subordinates is a brisk and sharp-tongued sergeant Oreshkina (Nadezhda Rumyantseva), who causes a lot of trouble to her commander. As result of an incident, they fall deep into the territory occupied by the Germans, flying above the front line on a barrage balloon. They descended into a haystack from the balloon, which is blown away by the wind. Waking up on a haystack, they find themselves in the middle of large number of German soldiers, who open up surrounding haystacks which appear to be anti-aircraft guns. Under their own haystack they discover an ammunition stockpile. Oreshkina accidentally sets the haystack on fire. In a panic following the fire on the ammunition stockpile Groznykh and Oreshkina escape from the site along with the Germans. Following explosion destroys both ammunition stockpile and anti-aircraft artillery battery.

Knowing that Germans will sweep the area for possible saboteurs Groznykh and Oreshkina disguise themselves as local residents - grandmother and grandson - who agreed to give their clothes. Suddenly, it appears that Groznykh needs to shave so he can resemble himself as the grandmother. In the urgent need to obtain shaving tools he derails the German train. Their quest to commandeer a transport they find a military post with an amphibious car. They manage to escape on the stolen German car by crossing a river, wondering, what other adventures await them behind enemy lines...

== Cast ==
- Nadezhda Rumyantseva - Raya Oreshkina
- Vitaly Solomin - Lieutenant Ivan Rodionovich Groznykh
- Vladimir Lippart - Sergeant Schepetnikov
- Valentin Abramov - staff captain
- Yuri Sorokin - SS Obersturmfuhrer
- Matvey Levinton - cook
- Pavel Vinnik - doctor
