= Zadornov =

Zadornov (Russian: Задорнов) is a Russian masculine surname, its feminine counterpart is Zadornova. It may refer to

- Mikhail Mikhailovich Zadornov (born 1963), Russian politician and former finance minister.
- Mikhail Nikolayevich Zadornov (1948–2017), Russian stand-up comedian and writer
  - 5043 Zadornov, a minor planet named after M.N. Zadornov
