= Train Stop – Two Minutes =

- Written by: Mark Zakharov
- Directed by: Mark Zakharov; Aleksandr Orlov
- Starring: Yuri Belov; Oleg Vidov; Valentina Telichkina
- Music by: Gennady Gladkov
- Country of origin: Soviet Union
- Original language: Russian

Production
- Cinematography: Evgeny Rusakov
- Running time: 70 min.
- Production company: Studio Ekran

Original release
- Release: 1972

Train Stop – Two Minutes (Russian: Стоянка поезда – две минуты, romanized: Stoyanka poyezda — dve minuty) is a 1972 Soviet television romantic musical film directed by Mark Zakharov and Aleksandr Orlov.

== Plot ==
From Moscow to the provincial town of Nizhnie Volchki comes a young and handsome doctor Igor Maksimov to work. He is liked by his colleagues, including the young nurse Alyona. However, life in a small town quickly gets boring for Igor, since there is no customary urbanization for the modern Muscovite in the Nizhnie Volchki, and the population is rarely sick and the local clinic is often empty, which means that neuropathologist Igor simply does not have anyone on whom to practice. He begins to miss the metropolitan life, friends and beloved woman – a famous pop singer. Alyona, realizing that Igor is almost ready to go back to Moscow, she decides to make him stay and turns for help to an eccentric local peasant Vasily, who has the gift of a real magician.

== Cast ==
- Yuri Belov – Vasily Nazarovich, the magician
- Oleg Vidov – Igor Pavlovich Maksimov, neurologist
- Valentina Telichkina – Alyona, a nurse
- Alexander Vigdorov – Mikhalko
- Alla Budnitskaya – Tamara Sergeevna Krasovskaya, the singer
- Lyudmila Ivanova – aunt Liza, a nurse
- Yuri Sarantsev – Vlas Petrovich, director of the club
- Viktor Sergachyov – Chief Physician
- Boris Sichkin – gorodki player, malinger
- Kira Smirnova – Glafira Mironovna
- Tatyana Gavrilova – mermaid
- Svetlana Shvayko – Telephone operator
- Irina Sushina – telephone operator / waitress
- Alla Meshcheryakova – secretary and telegraph operator
- Nina Krachkovskaya – Nina Vasilievna, the owner of the apartment
- Leonid Kanevsky – Krasovsky, entertainer (voiced by Valentin Gaft)
- Rimma Emelianenko – girl with a bagel
- Yuri Sorokin – guy with a guitar
- Igor Surovtsev – blond in a striped shirt
- Vitaly Komissarov – malinger
- Vladimir Grammatikov – malinger in an orange T-shirt
- Andrei Droznin – toothless malinger
- Sergey Malishevsky – malinger
- Roman Yuryev-Lunts – an old man at the meeting point
- Eduard Abalov – passenger of the train
- Mark Zakharov – malinger
- Svetlana Dutka – girl with an apple

== Music ==
- Gennady Gladkov – music
- Yuri Entin – lyrics
- Alla Pugacheva – female vocals
