= The Unamenables =

- Directed by: Yuri Chulyukin
- Written by: Tatyana Sytina
- Starring: Nadezhda Rumyantseva; Yuri Belov; Aleksei Kozhevnikov
- Cinematography: Konstantin Brovin
- Music by: Antonio Spadavecchia; Kirill Molchanov
- Production company: Mosfilm
- Release date: 1959
- Running time: 76 minutes
- Country: Soviet Union
- Language: Russian

The Unamenables (Russian: Неподдающиеся, romanized: Nepoddayushchiyesya) is a 1959 Soviet romantic comedy-drama film directorial debut of Yuri Chulyukin.

== Plot ==
Two foolish and frivolous guys cause suffering for the whole work team at the factory. It was already decided to fire Anatoly Gracchkin (Yuri Belov) and his friend Victor Gromoboev (Alexei Kozhevnikov), but they are taken under the wing by Nadia Berestova (Nadezhda Rumyantseva), a diminutive funny woman, known as the popular one at the plant.

Because of Nadia's status of a respectable and reliable person, the Komsomol members, without wasting time immediately give her the assignment to re-educate the boys. At first, Nadya takes it with reluctance and apprehension, but gradually this task becomes the most important thing in her life. She prepares for mischief-makers a daily plan and a list of books to read, brings them a lectures about marine biology, talks about Goncharov's novel Oblomov...

However, after Grachkin and Gromoboev succeed in tricking Nadya more than once, she understands that standard methods in this situation will not help.

== Cast ==
- Nadezhda Rumyantseva – Nadia Berestova
- Yuri Belov – Tolya Grachkin
- Alexei Kozhevnikov – Victor Gromoboev
- Valentin Kozlov – Volodya Yakovlev
- Vera Karpova – Rosa Katkova
- Svetlana Kharitonova – Lisa Kukushkina's friend Nadi
- Victor Egorov – Leon Butusov
- Yuri Nikulin – Vasily Klyachkin
- Konstantin Nassonov – plant director Andrei Ilich Baryshev
- Ivan Kashirin – workshop master Ivan Ignatievich Vatagin
- Victor Terekhov – Petya
- Vladimir Zemlyanikin – Zernov
- Yevgeny Bykadorov – diving coach
- Lilia Gritsenko – Nadia's mother
- Leonid Marennikov – waiter Pasha
- Vladimir Picek – waiter
- Nina Agapova – host of the dancing contest
- Sergey Filippov – the policeman
- Tamara Yarenko – episode
- Zinaida Tarahovskaya – episode
- Sasha Smirnov – boy who brought the cutter

== Awards ==
At the All-Union Film Festival in Minsk in 1960, the film received the prize for best comedy. Also, Nadezhda Rumyantseva was awarded for the best performance of the female role and Yuri Belov for the best performance of the male role.
