= Alyosha Ptitsyn Grows Up =

1953 film by Anatoliy Granik

- Polish film poster
- Directed by: Anatoly Granik
- Written by: Agniya Barto
- Cinematography: Yevgeni Shapiro
- Music by: Oleg Karavaychuk
- Production company: Lenfilm Studio
- Release date: 2 November 1953
- Running time: 73 minutes
- Country: Soviet Union
- Language: Russian

Alyosha Ptitsyn Grows Up (Russian: Алёша Птицын вырабатывает характер, romanized: Alyosha Ptitsyn vyrabatyvaet kharakter) is a 1953 Soviet family comedy film directed by Anatoly Granik and starring Viktor Kargopoltsev, Olga Pyzhova and Valentina Sperantova.

== Synopsis ==
Third-grader Alesha Ptitsyn, a little schoolboy from Moscow, decides to radically change his life; do self-education, to get rid of the guardianship of strict parents and a scattered grandmother, to live according to a strict routine and not to succumb to temptation. Having created a new schedule of the day, Alyosha starts a new life; he wakes up and gets up by himself, does his morning exercises and goes to school. At this time, Alesha's grandmother at the station misses her childhood friend, who came to stay with her granddaughter. Alesha, who accidentally meets them, decides to hold a city tour of Moscow for the guests in order to restore in their eyes a true representation of the hospitable Muscovites and to correct the misstep of his grandmother.

== Cast ==
- Viktor Kargopoltsev as Alyosha
- Olga Pyzhova as Alyosha grandma
- Valentina Sperantova as Grandmother Sima
- Natalya Polinkovskaya
- Yuri Bublikov as Andrey
- Tamara Alyoshina as Natalya, Alyosha's mother
- Nadezhda Rumyantseva as Galya
- Roza Makagonova as Olga, student
- Lidiya Sukharevskaya as Lt Sergeenko
- Sergei Podmasteryev as Gena
- Aleksandr Mikhaylov as Tikhon Ivanovich
- Borya Vasilev as Nikita, a friend of Alyosha
- Natalya Seleznyova as Sachenka (first film role)
