= Yuri Belov (actor) =

Soviet actor (1930–1991)

- Юрий Белов
- Belov in 1972
- Born: Yuri Andreevich Belov; 31 July 1930; Rzhev, Russian SFSR, Soviet Union
- Died: 31 December 1991 (aged 61); Moscow, Russia
- Occupation: actor
- Years active: 1955–1988
- Website: http://yuriy-belov.ucoz.ru/

Yuri Andreevich Belov (Russian: Юрий Андреевич Белов; 31 July 1930 – 31 December 1991) was a Soviet film and theatre actor and one of the most popular actors of Soviet cinema in the 1950s and 1960s.

== Biography and career ==
Yurii Belov was born July 31, 1930, in Rzhev (now - Tver Oblast). He spent his childhood in the Kuril Islands, as Yuri's father was a military man, and the last place of his service became the Far East.

He graduated from the VGIK (acting course of Boris Bibikov and Olga Pyzhova) in 1955. One year later he became famous for his role as Grisha in the film Carnival Night, which became the Soviet box office leader of 1956 with a total of 48.64 million tickets sold.

For the next seven years films were released with the actor one after another which consolidated his success among the audience and made Yuri Belov one of the most popular actors of the Soviet cinema. Some of the most popular films with him include The Girl Without an Address, Spring on Zarechnaya Street, The Unamenables, Queen of the Gas Station. In the last two films he played opposite Nadezhda Rumyantseva. Later he was an actor of National Film Actors' Theatre.

In the mid-1960s the actor was committed in a psychiatric hospital for six months, after which his career went downhill, he started to receive only episodic roles.

In the National Film Actors' Theatre he played Miloslavsky in the play "Ivan Vasilievich" written by Mikhail Bulgakov, which was one of his last notable roles in theatre. Subsequently, Belov left the National Film Actors' Theatre.

Belov played his last major role in the film Train Stop — Two Minutes (1972).

Because of his lack of demand as an actor, Belov worked as a driver on his car Moskvitch 402. He began to abuse alcohol, his health deteriorated with each passing year. In his latest film, Two and One (1988) Belov appeared in another minor role and was already seriously ill.

Yuri Belov died in the morning of December 31, 1991. He is buried at Kuntsevo Cemetery in Moscow, cemetery plot number 10.

== Personal life ==
At the age of 40 Yuri Belov married actress Svetlana Shvaiko. In 1976 they had a son Svyatoslav.

== Partial filmography ==
- Son (1955) as escort policeman
- Spring on Zarechnaya Street (1956) as Yevgeny Ishchenko
- Carnival Night (1956) as Grisha Koltsov
- The Girl Without an Address (1957) as Mitya
- May Stars (1959) as Probocník
- The Unamenables (1959) as Tolya Grachkin
- Thirst (1959) as Vasya Rogozin 'Patefon'
- 20,000 Leagues Across the Land (1961) as Nikolay Savin
- Alyosha's Love (1961) as Arkadiy
- The Man from Nowhere (1961) as Gavrilov
- Lyubushka (1961) as Dmitriy Burmin
- Hussar Ballad (1962) as hussar-partisan
- Come Tomorrow, Please... (1962) as Volodya
- Queen of the Gas Station (1963) as Slavka
- Come Here, Mukhtar! (1965) as Larionov
- Give Me a Book of Complaints (1965) as German
- Transitional Age (1969) as Mikhail Ivanovich
- Passing Through Moscow (1970) as Kolya
- Grandads-Robbers (1971) as Petya
- Nerves... Nerves... (1972) as militiaman
- Train Stop — Two Minutes (1972, TV Movie) as Vasily Nazarovich
- Neylon 100% (1973) as Khabibullin
- Goaway and Twobriefcases (1974) as Yuriy Andreyevich
- About the Little Red Riding Hood (1977, TV Movie) as Grandad
- The Woman who Sings (1979) as airplane passenger
- Moscow on the Hudson (1984) as Circus Clown

== Awards ==
Yuri Belov was winner of the All-Union Film Festival for his role in The Unamenables in the year 1960.
