= Towards Life =

The Encounter of a Lifetime
- An East German film poster
- Directed by: Nikolay Lebedev
- Written by: Ekaterina Vinogradskaya
- Starring: Nadezhda Rumyantseva
- Cinematography: Veniamin Levitin
- Music by: Vasily Solovyov-Sedoi
- Production company: Lenfilm Studio
- Release date: 1952
- Running time: 81 minutes
- Country: Soviet Union
- Language: Russian

Film

Towards Life (Russian: Навстречу жизни, romanized: Navstrechu zhizni) is a 1952 Soviet film directed by Nikolay Lebedev and starring Nadezhda Rumyantseva, Vladimir Sokolov and Georgi Semyonov. It was based on the novel Little Star by Ivan Vasilenko.

== Plot ==
A Leningrad vocational school is tasked with a complicated order for production of a batch of machine tools. The girls' team headed by Marusia decides to improve the performance by increasing the cutting speed of the lathe. The lathe breaks and Marusya feels very bad over this. The coworkers help Marusya to become more responsible. In contrast, the boys' team optimize the workflow and execute the state order with excellent marks.

== Cast ==
- Nadezhda Rumyantseva as Marusya Rodnikova
- Vladimir Sokolov as Pasha Sychev
- Georgi Semyonov as Semyon Ilyich
- Sergei Gurzo as Vasov
- Vasili Merkuryev as Vasili Nikanorovich
- Anatoly Kuznetsov as Marusya's father
- Viktor Khokhryakov as chairman of the graduation committee

== Bibliography ==
- Peter Kenez. Cinema and Soviet Society: From the Revolution to the Death of Stalin. Tauris, 2001.
