= The Polynin Case =

An incident with Polynin
- Russian: Случай с Полыниным
- Directed by: Aleksey Sakharov
- Written by: Aleksey Sakharov; Konstantin Simonov
- Starring: Anastasiya Vertinskaya; Oleg Efremov; Oleg Tabakov; Georgiy Burkov; Bella Manyakina; Nonna Mordyukova
- Cinematography: Genri Abramyan; Nikolay Nemolyaev
- Edited by: Antonina Zimina
- Music by: Yuriy Levitin
- Release date: 1970
- Country: Soviet Union
- Language: Russian

An Incident with Polynin (Russian: Случай с Полыниным) is a 1970 Soviet World War II film directed by Aleksey Sakharov.

== Plot ==
The film tells about the young Moscow actress Galina, who at the beginning of the war goes to the Karelian Front. The commander of an aviation regiment colonel Polynin watched her performance, and they fell in love with each other. Soon he was transferred to serve near Moscow, and the actress asked him to put her letter in a mailbox there. She explained that the letter was about her work. Actually, it was addressed to her lover, a prominent theater director. Polynin decided not to put the letter to the mailbox, but to bring it to the addressee himself.

The film is characterized by the deep psychological insight into the feelings and emotions of the personages, which is typical of Simonov's works. Superb acting of Russian film stars Vertinskaya and Efremov makes the film a masterpiece devoted to World War II.

== Cast ==
- Anastasiya Vertinskaya
- Oleg Efremov
- Oleg Tabakov as Viktor Balakirev
- Georgiy Burkov
- Bella Manyakina
- Nonna Mordyukova
- Aleksandr Khanov
- Lev Durov
- Yuri Prokopovich
- Nina Spiglazova
- Gennadiy Chikhachev
- Vladimir Kashpur
