= Carnival Night =

- Original film poster by Mikhail Heifits, 1956.
- Directed by: Eldar Ryazanov
- Written by: Boris Laskin; Vladimir Polyakov
- Starring: Igor Ilyinsky; Lyudmila Gurchenko; Yuri Belov
- Cinematography: Arkadi Koltsaty
- Music by: Anatoli Lepin
- Production company: Mosfilm
- Release dates: 1956 (Soviet Union); November 2, 1957 (U.S.)
- Running time: 78 minutes
- Country: Soviet Union
- Language: Russian
- Box office: 48.64 million tickets sold.

Carnival Night (Russian: Карнавальная ночь, romanized: Karnavalnaya noch) is a 1956 Soviet musical film. It is Eldar Ryazanov's first big-screen film, and Lyudmila Gurchenko's first role. It is also one of the most famous films starring popular comedian Igor Ilyinsky.

Produced during the Khrushchev Thaw, the film became the Soviet box office leader of 1956 with a total of 48.64 million tickets sold. Today it remains a highly popular New Year's Eve classic across Russia and the former Soviet Union.

== Plot ==
It is Novy God and the employees of a House of Culture are ready with their annual New Year's entertainment program. It includes a lot of dancing and singing, jazz band performance and even magic tricks. Suddenly, an announcement is made that a new director has been appointed and that he is arriving shortly. Comrade Ogurtsov arrives in time to review and disapprove of the scheduled entertainment. To him, holiday fun has a different meaning, he imagines speakers reading annual reports to show the club's progress over the year and a lecturer speaking for 40 minutes about the possibility of life on the planet Mars. And, perhaps, a bit of serious music, something from the Classics, played by the Veterans' orchestra.

Unsurprisingly, no one wants to change the program with only a few hours before the show, much less to replace it with something so boring. So everyone teams up in order to prevent Ogurtsov from getting to the stage. They manage to trap Ogurtsov by any means necessary so that the acts can perform their scheduled pieces, and celebrate New Year's Eve as originally planned.

== Cast ==
- Igor Ilyinsky as Serafim Ivanovich Ogurtsov, acting club director
- Lyudmila Gurchenko as Lena Krylova
- Yuri Belov as Grisha Koltsov, electrician
- Andrei Tutyshkin as Fyodor Petrovich Mironov, bookkeeper
- Olga Vlasova as Adelaida Kuzminichna Romashkina, librarian
- Tamara Nosova as Tosya Burigina, Ogurtsov's secretary
- Georgi Kulikov as Seryozha Usikov, painter
- Gennadi Yudin as Jazz band Conductor
- Vladimir Zeldin as Nikolayev, Tip Clown
- Boris Petker as Nikolay Sidorov, Top Clown
- Sergei Filippov as Comrade Nekadilov, lecturer
- Shmelev Sisters as Singing Waitresses
- Gusakov Brothers as Step Dancers
- Tamara Sokolova and Petr Pomazkov as Dancers

== Crew ==
- Director: Eldar Ryazanov
- Writers: Boris Laskin, Vladimir Polyakov
- Cinematography: Arkady Koltsaty
- Composer: Anatols Liepiņš (Anatoly Lepin)
- Music orchestration: Eddie Rosner, also jazz band leader (uncredited)

== Production ==
Mosfilm's director of that time Ivan Pyryev was the one who appointed Eldar Ryazanov to direct the picture despite Ryazanov not having interest in musicals at that time. Pyryev was heavily involved in the making of the film, assisting Ryazanov every step of the way.

Because the picture was Ryazanov's first directorial experience, the young director was met with severe skepticism and after seeing half of the filmed material the artistic council was convinced that the film would turn out to be a huge failure.

Initially Lyudmila Gurchenko was rejected for the role of Lena Krylova by director Eldar Ryazanov and the artist council. Another actress was hired, however she could not handle the part. Then Ryazanov came to Pyryev with the appeal to hire a new actress, adding that anyone but Gurchenko should be signed up for the role of Krylova. But when Pyryev later saw Gurchenko in the Mosfilm corridor, he decided that there was something special about her. Pyryev brought her to the set and announced that she will act in the film.

The film was made in five months, with most of the scenes shot in the Russian Army Theatre.

== Soundtrack ==
Музыка к кинофильму «Карнавальная ночь»

Soundtrack album by Anatoly Lepin
- Released: 1956
- Genres: Jazz, Soviet estrada, film score
- Label: Leningradsky Zavod

External videos
- Pyat' minut ("Пять минут")

All music is composed by Anatoly Lepin

No.	Title	Artist	Length
1.	"Maski" (instrumental)	Eddie Rosner Orchestra
2.	"Tanechka"	Shmelev Sisters
3.	"Pasodoble" (instrumental)	Eddie Rosner Orchestra
4.	"Pesenka o horoshem nastroyenii"	L. Gurchenko
5.	"Pesenka o vlyublyonnom paren'ke"	L. Gurchenko & Y. Zeitlin
6.	"Karnaval'naya noch'" (instrumental)	Eddie Rosner Orchestra
7.	"Five Minutes"	L. Gurchenko & Shmelev Sisters

The song «Любовь — это счастье» ("Love is a Happiness") sung by Gurchenko was not included in the film.

== Sequel ==
In 2006 Ryazanov made a sequel to the picture, called Carnival Night 2, or Fifty Years Later starring Alyona Babenko and Sergei Bezrukov. The film garnered mostly negative reviews.

== See also ==
- List of films set around New Year
