= Vladimir Sukhomlin =

Russian computer scientist

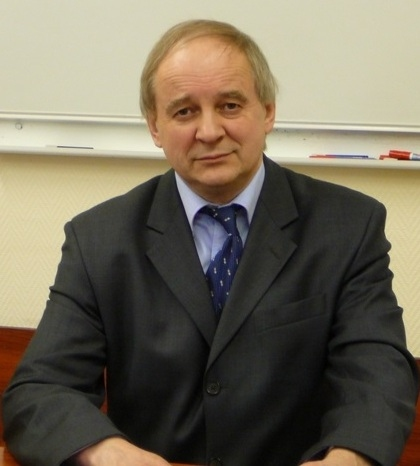
- Born: September 18, 1945; Moscow, USSR
- Education: Doctor of Science (1989); Professor (1992)
- Alma mater: Moscow Power Engineering Institute
- Scientific career
- Fields: information technology
- Workplaces: MSU CMC
- Doctoral advisor: Lev Korolyov

Vladimir Sukhomlin (Russian: Владимир Александрович Сухомлин) is a Russian computer scientist, Dr.Sc., Professor, a professor at the Faculty of Computer Science at the Moscow State University.

== Biography ==
Born in the family of a documentary filmmaker Yuri Ozerov. He graduated from the Moscow Power Engineering Institute (1969).

He defended the thesis «An integrated approach to the creation of technological software for the automation of scientific research in the field of real-time radio-electronic systems and their functional software» for the degree of Doctor of Technical Sciences (1989). Academic title Professor (1992).

Honorary Professor at Moscow State University (2013). Medal "In Commemoration of the 850th Anniversary of Moscow" (1997).

Head of the subcommittee of the Russian Committee for the Standardization of Information Technology. An expert RFBR, takes part in the work of the Open Systems Committee RAS.

Works at Moscow State University (since 1973). Head of the Laboratory of Open Information Technologies, Faculty CMC MSU (since 1998).

== Main scientific publications ==
Published more than 80 research papers and 13 monographs.
