= Mikhail Zadornov =

Mikhail Zadornov may refer to:

- Mikhail Zadornov (comedian) (1948–2017), Russian stand-up comedian and writer
- Mikhail Zadornov (politician) (born 1963), Russian economist and politician
