= Royal Regatta =

- Russian: Королевская регата
- Directed by: Yuri Chulyukin
- Written by: Anatoliy Agranovsky; Mikhail Ancharov
- Starring: Natalya Kustinskaya; Valentin Smirnitskiy; Aleksandr Gruzinsky; Aleksandr Khanov; Georgiy Kulikov
- Cinematography: German Shatrov
- Release date: 1966
- Country: Soviet Union
- Language: Russian

Royal Regatta (Russian: Королевская регата) is a 1966 Soviet comedy film directed by Yuri Chulyukin.

== Plot ==
A student team is defeated in rowing competitions. The coach decides to leave with the four best rowers. The remaining athletes want to revive the team; they attract a new coach who develops a new technique for them. The team gains the opportunity to compete in an international regatta.

== Cast ==
- Natalya Kustinskaya as Alyona, a stewardess
- Valentin Smirnitskiy as Vasya
- Aleksandr Gruzinsky as Sexton
- Aleksandr Khanov as Grandfather
- Georgiy Kulikov as Nikolai Lvovich 'Niels Bohr' - a coach
- Vyacheslav Zakharov as Seva - a coxswain
- Aleksandr Potapov as Taras
- A. Martyshkin as Pashka
- Igor Yurash as Anton (as Igor Iurashas)
- Leonid Brusin as Vikentiy (as L. Bruskin)
- Georgiy Svetlani as Gervasiy Fedoseyevich - a sexton (as G. Svetlani)
- Leonid Chubarov
- Klarina Frolova-Vorontsova
- Ervin Knausmyuller as An umpire
- Vladimir Lippart
- Irina Miroshnichenko as Violetta
- Oleg Mokshantsev as Soluyanov - a coach
- Pyotr Repnin
- Janis Sparre as Sports commentator
- Yuriy Tsurilo as Marko (as Yu. Tsurilo)
