= Ekaterina Vinogradskaya =

Russian screenwriter

- Born: 1 November 1905; Oryol, Russian Empire
- Died: 10 May 1973 (aged 67); Moscow, Russia
- Occupation: Screenwriter

Ekaterina Nikolayevna Vinogradskaya (Russian: Екатери́на Никола́евна Виногра́дская; 1905-1973) was a Russian screenwriter active in the film industry from 1929 through 1952. She studied drama at the First Studio of Moscow Arts Theatre before becoming a writer.

== Selected filmography ==
- Navstrechu zhizni (1952)
- Put slavy (1949)
- The Great Beginning (1940)
- Anna (1936)
- Begstvuyushchiy ostrov (1929)
- Fragment of an Empire (1929)
