= Nadezhda Rumyantseva =

Soviet and Russian actress

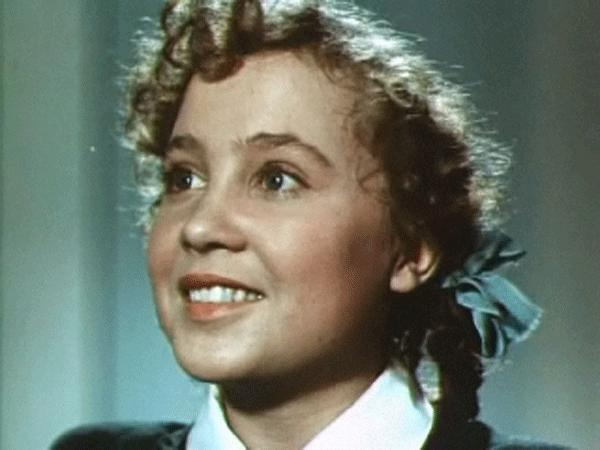
- Rumyantseva in The Encounter of a Lifetime, 1952
- Born: Nadezhda Vasilyevna Rumyantseva; 9 September 1930; Potapovo, Smolensk Oblast, Russian SFSR, Soviet Union
- Died: 8 April 2008 (aged 77); Moscow, Russia
- Years active: 1952–2008

Nadezhda Vasilyevna Rumyantseva (Russian: Наде́жда Васи́льевна Румя́нцева, 9 September 1930, Potapovo, Smolensk Oblast — 8 April 2008, Moscow) was a popular Soviet and Russian actress. People’s Artist of the RSFSR (1991).

== Biography ==
=== Early years ===
Nadezhda Rumyantseva was born in the Potapovo village (now Gagarinsky District) into a simple Russian family. Her father Vasily Ivanovich Rumyantsev was a war veteran. He worked as a train conductor and later — as a forest guard. Her mother Olga Vsevolodovna Rumyantseva was a housewife.

After graduating from school Nadezhda entered theatrical courses at the Moscow Central Children's Theater. Very soon she became one of the leading actresses at this theater, although the courses were dismissed in just a year under a government initiative. With the help of her teacher Olga Pyzhova she enrolled to the Russian Academy of Theatre Arts and later — to VGIK which she finished in 1955. In-between she acted in plays and movies.

=== Film career ===
Rumyantseva's first breakthrough happened in 1959 with the comedy The Unamenables directed by Yuri Chulyukin where she was given the leading role, along with her fellow-student Yuri Belov, Alexei Kozhevnikov and Yuri Nikulin. The film turned so successful (10th place at the Soviet box office with 31.83 million viewers) that Chulyukin invited her to act in his second movie — Devchata that was finished in 1961. Her partner was Nikolai Rybnikov. The movie hit the 5th spot with 34.8 million viewers and brought international fame to Nadezhda who was named the best actress at the Mar del Plata International Film Festival in 1962.

Same year she reunited with Belov and Kozhevnikov in the comedy Queen of the Gas Station shot at the Dovzhenko Film Studios. Once again, it turned into one of the box office leaders (5th place with 34.3 million viewers) and remains among the most beloved Soviet comedy films up till these days. Rumyantseva was named Merited Artist of the Russian SFSR later on. She appeared in her last leading role in the 1967 war comedy Tough Nut along with Vitaly Solomin. It was well received by the public, but criticised by the official press for turning the Great Patriotic War into a primitive parody.

Around the same time Rumyantseva married a Soviet diplomat Villi Khshtoyan who worked at the Ministry of International Trade of the USSR. They spent nearly 15 years abroad, which she fully dedicated to her husband and his daughter from the first marriage (she couldn't give birth to her own children). After their return Nadezhda rarely appeared on the big screen. By that time she was more interested in dubbing. She did voice overs for many foreign pictures and TV series, as well as some of the Soviet movies and animated films. She also became the main presenter of the popular children's TV show Alarm Clock. A member of the Film Actors' Theater-Studio since 1955.

=== Late years ===
In 1996 two burglars tried to rob Rumyantseva's Moscow apartment. Her husband — a former boxer — managed to stop them, but she was hit on the head by one of the robbers which led to serious damage and frequent pain. She was later diagnosed with a brain tumor. She died in 2008 and was buried at the Moscow Armenian Cemetery in the Khshtoyan family tomb. She was survived by her husband Villi Khshtoyan and his daughter Karina.

== Selected filmography ==
Year	English Title	Original Title	Role
1952	The Encounter of a Lifetime	Навстречу жизни	Marusya Rodnikova
1953	Alyosha Ptitsyn Grows Up	Алёша Птицын вырабатывает характер	Galya Ptitsyna
1955	The Mexican	Мексиканец	May
1955	Spring Voices	Весенние голоса	Nina
1959	The Unamenables	Неподдающиеся	Nadia Berestova
1961	Devchata (The Girls)	Девчата	Tosya
1962	Queen of the Gas Station	Королева бензоколонки	Lyudmila Dobriyvecher
1963	Three Fat Men (animation)	Три толстяка	Suok (voice)
1964	Balzaminov's Marriage	Женитьба Бальзаминова	Raisa
1964	An Easy Life	Лёгкая жизнь	Galya
1967	Kidnapping, Caucasian Style	Кавказская пленница	Nina (voice)
1967	Tough Nut	Крепкий орешек	Rayisa Oreshkina
1969	White Sun of the Desert	Белое солнце пустыни	Gyulchatai (voice)
1971	The Twelve Chairs	12 стульев	Liza (voice)
1971	Fakir hour	Факир на час	Tatiana Mironova
1976	Circus in the Circus	Соло для слона с оркестром	Doc. Whistlerová (dubbing)
1976	38 Parrots (animation)	38 попугаев	Monkey (voice)
1981	The Traded Laughter	Проданный смех	Emma Rickert
1982	Sportloto-82	Спортлото-82	Tanya (voice)
1989	Private Detective, or Operation Cooperation	Частный детектив, или Операция «Кооперация»	Lena Pukhova (voice)
2002	The Choom Valley	Чудная долина	Aisha
2005	Unexpected Joy	Нечаянная радость	Maria Ivanovna
