= Auezov Theater =

Theatre in Almaty, Kazakhstan

- Kazakh: Мұхтар Әуезов атындағы театры, Mūhtar Äuezov atyndağy teatry Russian: Театр имени Мухтара Ауэзова
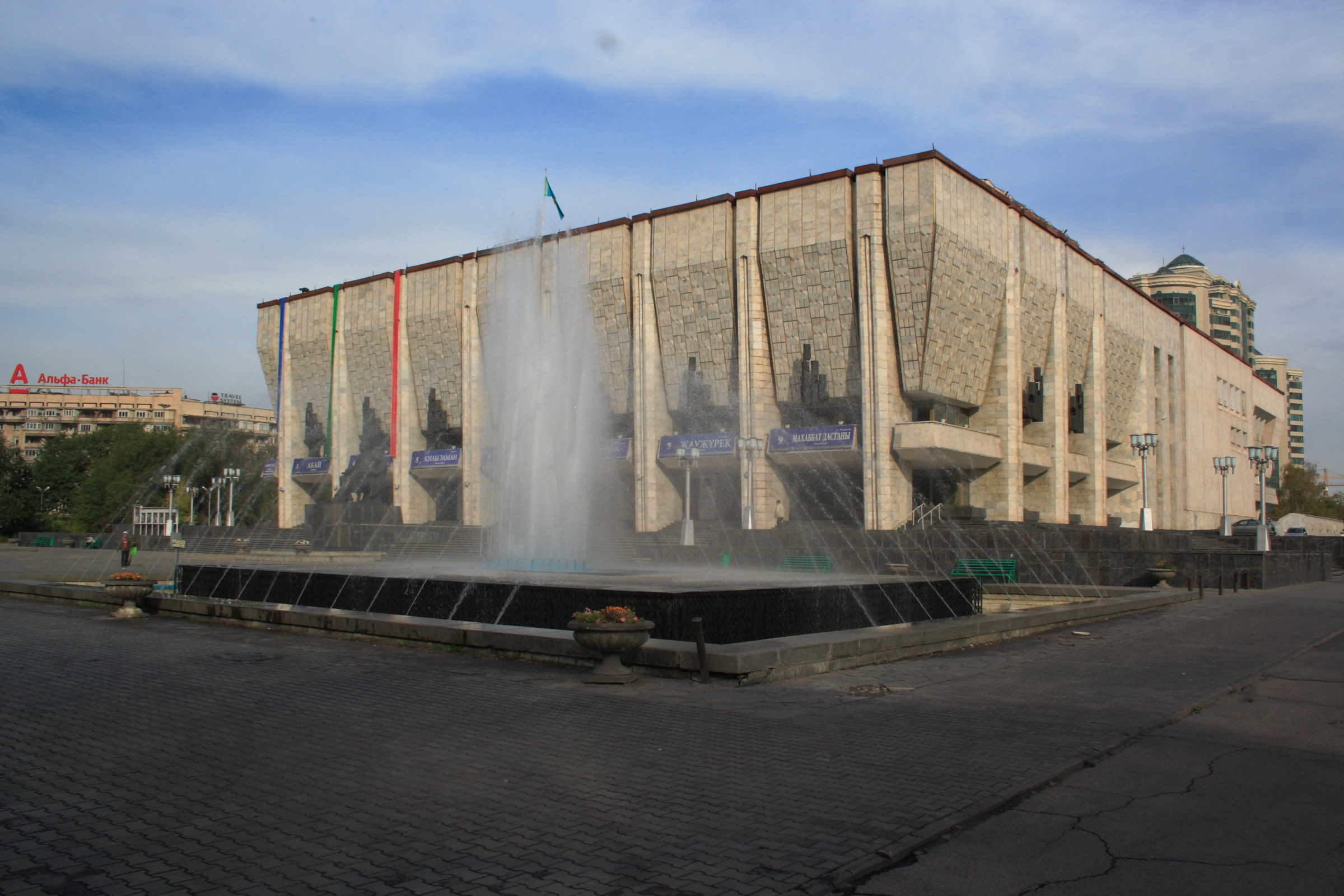
- Interactive map of Auezov Theater
- Full name: Kazakh State Academic Drama Theater named after M.O. Auezov
- Address: Almaty; Kazakhstan
- Coordinates: 43°14′29″N 76°55′4″E
- Owner: Erkin Zhuasbek
- Capacity: 756 seats

Construction
- Opened: 1926 in Kyzylorda; 1928 in Almaty
- Renovated: 2008
- Reopened: 1963, 1982
- Rebuilt: 1981

Website
- http://auezov-teatr.kz

Auezov Theater with a full name of Kazakh State Academic Drama Theater named after M.O. Auezov is located on Kurmangazy Street in Almaty, Kazakhstan near the Esentai River.

It holds a large 1,000-seat auditorium and a 250-seat experimental theater. The building's exterior and the interior are designed with regular lines on which the surfaces are decorated in traditional style. A series of uniform columns emphasize the main front and make it stand solemn and grand in contrast to the other buildings around it.

A Mukhtar Auezov monument which was installed in 1980, located in front of the theater, shows figure resembling Auezov sitting in an armchair as if immersed in his thoughts. He was a writer of prose and is most known for The Path of Abai - a book tracing the rise of fame and popularity of Abay.

The theater is located near the Circus and the Wedding Palace. The theater's plays are in classical and modern style productions in the Kazakh language in which translation into Russian is provided. Theater works all year round with performances beginning around 6:30pm. A metro station, is also located in front of the theater for which makes it possible to arrive to the location by using a metro.

== History ==
It was established in late 1925 in city of Kyzylorda, then the capital of Kazakh SSR. The theater opened on January 13, 1926, with a play "Sakina Altyn" ("Golden Ring") by Koshka Kemengerov staged by Serally Kozhamkulov and a large concert ensemble.

In 1928, after the transfer of the capital to Almaty, the theater was also moved there.

In 1937, the theater was awarded the title of Academy Building.

The theater is rooted in the works of masters and amateurs of folk art such as Amre Kashaubaev, Kurmanbek Dzhandarbekov, Kozhamkulov Serally, Kalibek Kuanyshpaev, Yelyubay Umurzakov, Isa Baizakov, Kanabek Baiseitov, K. Bader, Munaitpasov K., J. Shanin, F. Ashkeeva, Z. Atabaeva, Shabana Baizakov.

During the early years of the theater, the directors who were nominated for the actor's seat were Shanin, Kozhamkulov, and Dzhandarbekov. The first play was created by the following writers: Auezov, Seifullin, Myleene. Early performances created in this theater reflected the establishment of Soviet power. Early plays include the "Red Falcons" by Seifullin, "Zarlyk" by Uspanov and Uteulin; as well as performances about life in the old village. Pre-revolutionary life of the Kazakh people was interpreted in plays such as "Karakoz", "Baybishe - Current", directed by Auezov, "Wedding", "Sly Mullah" by Maylin, "Malkambay" by Erdanaev, as well as "Torsykbay", "Aidarbek", "Arkalyk Batyr" created by Shanin.

In the 1930s, the theater attracted professional Russian directors including M.Nasonov, I.Hog, M.Sokolovsky, and artist K. Khodzhikov, who proceeded to set up challenging dramatic works such as «Night peals» by Auezov, «Amangeldy» by Mailin and Musrepov.

In 1941-45 during World War II. The basis of the acts of performances devoted to the heroic struggle of the Soviet people: "In the hour of trial" by Auezov, "Guards of honor" by Auezov and Abishev and "Sir-Ahan - Ak Tokta" by Musrepov, "Taming of the Shrew" by Shakespeare.

In 1961 as a tribute to Auezov who died that year, the theater was renamed after him, and was given the title of Drama Theater.

From 1963 until 1982, the theater was located in a new building with 800 seats in the Komintern Square, facing the A. Imanov park, located in then Communist, now Abylaikhan street.

In 1982, the theater was moved to its current and permanent place, in a new, solemn building in the center of Almaty. The room was fully equipped with the necessary shops and the most modern facilities. There were two rooms, a large hall with 756 seats and a small little room with 276 seats in the theater.

The most significant plays from the end of World War II until the 1980s were "Friendship and love", "Career and Conscience" by Abishev, "Millionaire" by Mustafin, "Yesterday and Today", "Hard Fate" by Khusainov, "One tree - not the forest" by Tazhibaev, "cub under a cap", "Matchmaker arrived" "In a foreign country," by Mukhamedzhanov, "Saule", "Buran" by Akhtanov, "The Heart of the poet" by Shashkin, "Unquenchable fire" by Kabdolov, "Ascent of Mount Fuji" by Aitmatov, Mukhamedzhanov and many others.

In 2006 the theater was closed for renovation. Modern lighting, sound equipment, air conditioning and heating system were installed. The reconstruction lasted for almost three years, and the theater reopened its doors in December 2008.

== Theater Museum ==
The Theater Museum is located on the 4th floor of the theater building. As of 2021, the museum fund is about 200 thousand exhibits. The fund contains photographs, posters, programs, biographies of theater artists, their personal materials, manuscripts, gifts from the 30s to the present day. In addition, the museum has a large collection of portraits, the first stage costumes that have been worn in many performances since the 30s. Exhibitions from the fund of the Theater Museum are shown in such large cities as Astana, Kostanay, Taldykorgan. On the basis of the archive a book album on the history of theater has been published.
