= After the Wedding (1962 film) =

1962 film directed by Mikhail Yershov

- Russian: После свадьбы
- Directed by: Mikhail Yershov
- Written by: Daniil Granin
- Starring: Stanislav Khitrov; Natalya Kustinskaya; Aleftina Konstantinova; Leonard Borisevich; Pavel Kashlakov
- Cinematography: Vladimir Burykin
- Music by: Oleg Karavaychuk
- Release date: 1962
- Country: Soviet Union
- Language: Russian

After the Wedding (Russian: После свадьбы) is a 1962 Soviet drama film directed by Mikhail Yershov.

== Plot ==
A young guy from Leningrad is getting married and after the wedding he goes on duty to the village. After some time he is allowed to return, but he decides to stay in the village, because he understands that the collective farm needs him.

== Cast ==
- Stanislav Khitrov as Igor Malyutin
- Natalya Kustinskaya as Tonya Malyutina
- Aleftina Konstantinova as Vera
- Leonard Borisevich as Aleksey Ivanovich Ippolitov
- Pavel Kashlakov as Genka
- Yury Solovyov as Semyon
- Georgy Satini as Yuriy Pavlovich Pisarev
- Vera Titova as Nadezhda Osipovna
- Yevgeniy Teterin as Vitaliy Fadeyevich Chernyshyov
- YeBoris Kokovkin as Kislov
