= May Stars =

- Russian: Майские звезды, Czech: Májové hvězdy
- Directed by: Stanislav Rostotsky
- Written by: Ludvík Aškenazy
- Starring: Aleksandr Khanov; Misa Staninec; Jana Dítětová; Ladislav Pešek; Jana Brejchová
- Cinematography: Václav Hunka; Vyacheslav Shumskiy
- Edited by: Yevgeniya Abdirkina; Jaromír Janáček
- Music by: Kirill Molchanov
- Release date: 1959
- Running time: 95 minute
- Countries: Soviet Union; Czechoslovakia
- Languages: Russian; Czech

May Stars (Russian: Майские звезды, romanized: Mayskiye zvezdy, Czech: Májové hvězdy) is a 1959 Soviet-Czechoslovak war film directed by Stanislav Rostotsky.

The film's director was WWII soldier and present during the events in Prague in 1945, so the film was largely based on his personal experiences. The film's romantic atmosphere is filled with the joy of the end of a cruel war, as well as the hopes and expectations brought by the coming of peace.

== Plot ==
The entire film, which consists of four short stories, permeated by the bright, lyrical mood of the approaching peace.

=== Two Generals ===
Soviet troops enter the city. There is widespread joy among the residents of Prague: the war is over. A general (Aleksandr Khanov), who has not slept for three nights during the long journey to Prague, is travelling in a "Willys MB". His adjutant and driver resort to a ruse, faking a car breakdown to give the commander a chance to get a few hours of sleep in the nearest house. The general, who falls asleep immediately, is woken by a small Czech boy who has taken a liking to his papakha. It turns out that the general also had a family and children who died during the Siege of Leningrad. The boy lightheartedly falls asleep next to the general wearing his papakha, saying: "now we are both generals". However, the general must move on; the papakha, in which the boy's head is drowned, is left with him as a souvenir.

=== Chalk for the Sappers ===
The fighting has come to an end, but the sappers still have plenty of work to do. After successfully completing the demining process, one of the groups returns to their unit in an old count's horse-drawn carriage. The mines have been removed, but they have run out of chalk. It turns out there is a school nearby. The lieutenant (Vyacheslav Tikhonov), dissatisfied with his subordinates' antics with the carriage, decides to go for the chalk himself and falls in love with a young teacher.

=== A House Worth a Million ===
A Prague resident returning from Auschwitz discovers that his attic flat has been occupied by a Sudeten German who is shooting at passers-by. Concerned residents call on Soviet tank crews for help. The crew of a T-34-85 takes aim at the attic with their cannon, much to the displeasure of the building's owner (Miloš Nedbal), who declares that his house "is worth a million crowns". One of the tank crew (Leonid Bykov), smiling cynically, asks — really a million? It seems the house is doomed. However, the tank crew resort to a trick: they fire over the house, while the cynical tankman sneaks inside and settles the matter with the German. It turns out, however, that he himself was mortally wounded while saving the house.

=== On the Tram ===
Peaceful life returns, and the first post-war tram has already started running. A Soviet sergeant and passenger on this tram, who is deathly tired of the war (Nikolai Kryuchkov), recalls his civilian, pre-war profession as a tram driver and asks his Czech colleague to give up his seat a little. The Czech driver is strict — unauthorised persons are not allowed to drive the tram. However, gradually, with the full support of all the Prague passengers, he softens and gives up his seat to his Soviet colleague.

== Cast ==
- Aleksandr Khanov as Generál
- Míša Staninec as Dušan
- Jana Dítětová as Matka
- Ladislav Pešek as Řídící učitel
- Jana Brejchová as Učitelka Jana
- Vyacheslav Tikhonov as Por. Rukavickin
- Mikhail Pugovkin as Staršina
- Miloš Nedbal as Novák
