= Natalya Kustinskaya =

Soviet actress (1938–2012)

- Наталья Кустинская
- Kustinskaya in 1980
- Born: Natalya Nikolayevna Kustinskaya; April 5, 1938; Moscow, Soviet Union
- Died: December 13, 2012 (aged 74); Moscow, Russia
- Occupation: actress
- Years active: 1959—1989
- Awards: Honored Artist of the Russian Federation (1999)

Natalya Nikolayevna Kustinskaya (Russian: Ната́лья Никола́евна Кусти́нская; 5 April 1938 – 13 December 2012) was a Soviet actress, who was a Meritorious Artist of Russia from 1999.

Kustinskaya was born in Moscow, and starred in a total of twenty films. Her most recognizable roles were in Three Plus Two, Ivan Vasilievich: Back to the Future and in the TV series Eternal Call. She died on 13 December 2012 from complications of pneumonia.

== Filmography ==
- 1959 – Gloomy Mourning as Marusya
- 1960 – Stronger Than A Hurricane as Katya Belyayeva
- 1960 / 1961 – The First Challenges as Yadvisya
- 1961 – Maiden Years as Nastya
- 1962 – After the Wedding as Tonya
- 1962 – Dismissal to the Shore as Katya Fyodorova
- 1963 – Three Plus Two as Natalya
- 1965 – Sleeping Lion as Natasha Tsvetkova
- 1966 – Royal Regatta as Alyona
- 1971 – Spring Fairy Tale as Yelena the Beautiful
- 1971 – Wandering Front as Vera Turchaninova
- 1973 – Ivan Vasilievich: Back to the Future as Yakin's girlfriend
- 1973 / 1983 – Eternal Call as Polina Lakhnovskaya
- 1975 – Accident as woman in car
- 1976 – Apprentice as Svetlana
- 1978 – Pushful Person as Irina
- 1980 – My Dad, idealist as Silva
- 1981 – Driver for One Trip as Masha
- 1982 – Simply Awful! as Cat Hostess
- 1989 – Svetik as Vera's mother
