= Wedding Palace (Almaty) =

Building in Almaty, Kazakhstan

Wedding palace of Almaty
- Дворец бракосочетания Алматы
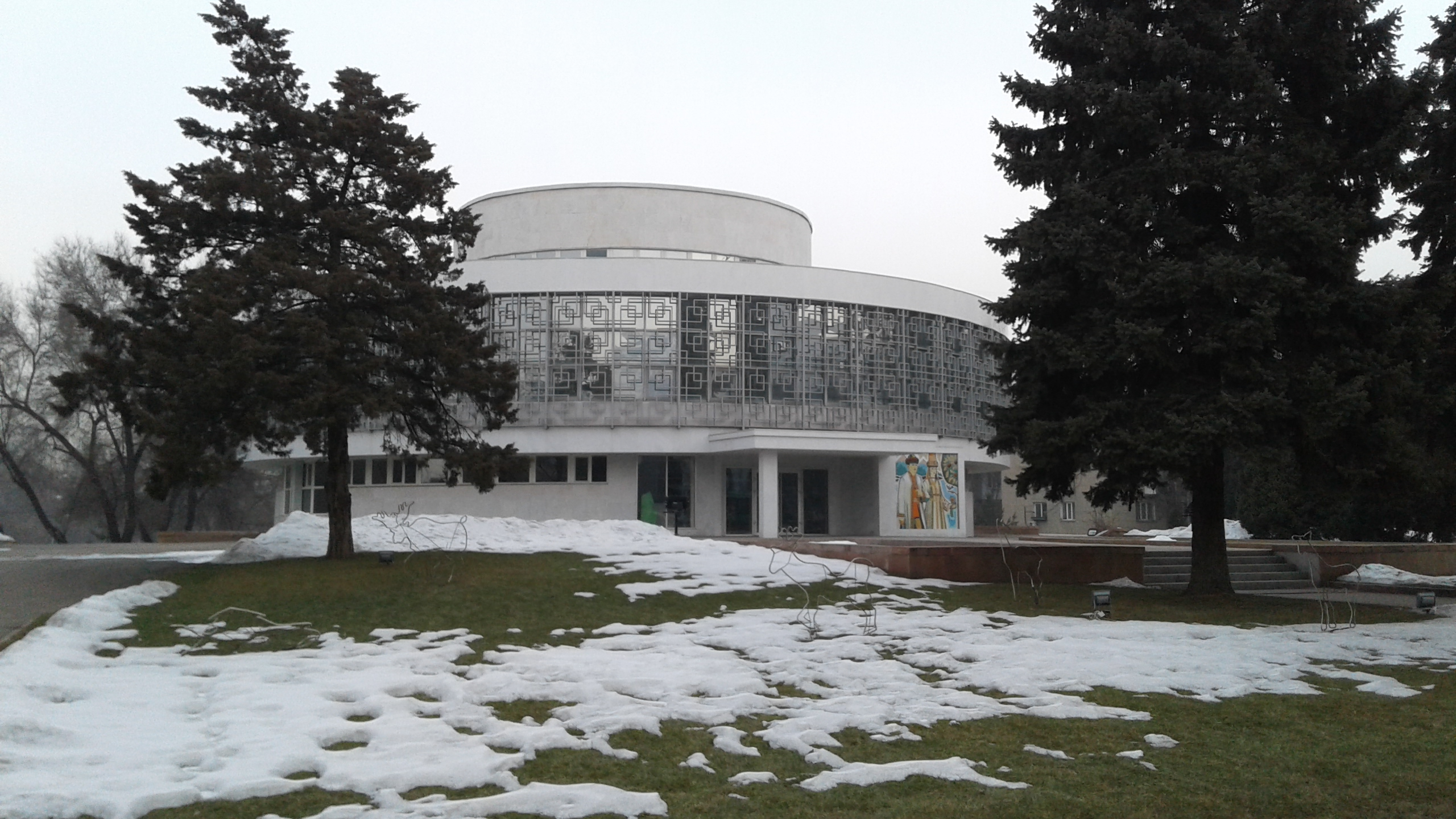
- Wedding palace of Almaty

General information
- Town or city: Almaty
- Country: Kazakhstan
- Coordinates: 43°14′28″N 76°55′12″E
- Completed: 1971

Wedding palace of Almaty (Kazakh: Неке сарайы, romanized: Neke saraiy; Russian: Дворец бракосочетания Алматы, tr. dvorets brakosochetaniya almaty) - is a building designed for weddings, an architectural monument of local importance in Almaty, Kazakhstan.

== History ==
The wedding palace was built by the decision of Dinmukhamed Kunaev, the First Secretary of the Central Committee of the Communist Party of the Kazakh SSR. The opening took place on November 22, 1971. The building was located on Abay Avenue, in a place near the Vesnovka river. The building was designed by architects Mendikulov Malbagar, Alexander Leppik and engineer Orazymbetov Nurgazy. The authors of the artistic decoration of the building - wall paintings, mosaics and embossing - were the artists: Moldakhmet Kenbaev and Nikolai Tsivchinsky.

== Architecture ==
The wedding palace is a two-story, round building. It consists of cylindrical bodies, symbolizing two wedding rings, one inside the other. The basis of the structure is a hollow reinforced concrete frame of round shape, with a diameter of 34 meters. The walls and the roof are monolithic on ledgers, in a reinforced concrete frame. The facade is faced with white marble, divided by circular continuous glazing. The plinth on the north side, hidden in relief, finished in polished granite. The sun protection devices (grids), which surround the windows in a continuous ring, the geometric pattern of which is executed in the form of a national ornament, give the building a light, elegant solemnity and expressiveness. The interior of the building is in the form of a Kazakh yurt.

== Reconstruction ==
In 2001, the Wedding Palace was reconstructed instead of the legally required restoration, as the building is a local architectural monument. As a result of the reconstruction, the interior of the building was completely redecorated; the copper bas-relief frieze in the national Kazakh style, the original crystal chandelier and the embossing at the main entrance disappeared from the second floor. An annex was added to the main entrance, and the interior columns were stripped of their white marble.

In 2013, another major reconstruction of the building was carried out, the marble decoration partially disappeared from the facade, instead of which plasterboard and stucco appeared. The original window frames were replaced with other frames.

In 2017, the building was leased to a private landlord, who again carried out another reconstruction of the building.

The exterior of the building was given the historic architectural appearance of the exterior, based on archival drawings and sketches from 1971. The same drawings and sketches were converted into electronic format for their further use in the museum exhibition. The interior of the building underwent only cosmetic repairs during the renovations. The corporate style was developed which was based on the national Kazakh knot ornament, embodying the inviolability of marital ties and the union of woman and man. The same type of ornament was used in the construction of the building in the sun lattices. Illustrations of national wedding traditions were developed for the interior design and subsequent use in corporate materials.
