= People's Artist of the USSR =

Honorary title granted to artists of the Soviet Union

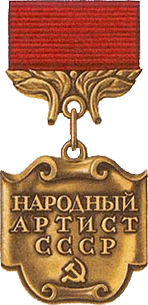
- Breast badge of the People's Artist of the USSR (performing arts)

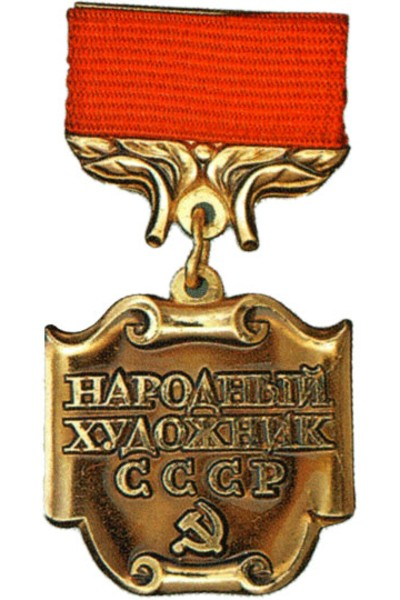
- Breast badge of the People's Artist of the USSR (visual arts)

People's Artist of the USSR, also sometimes translated as National Artist of the USSR, was an honorary title granted to artists of the Soviet Union. The term is confusingly used to translate two Russian-language titles: Народный артист СССР (Narodny artist SSSR), awarded in the performing arts, and Народный художник СССР (Narodny khudozhnik SSSR), granted in some visual arts.

As those titles were granted by the government, honorees were afforded certain privileges and would often receive commissions from the Minister of Culture of the Soviet Union. Accordingly, artists and authors who expressed criticism of the Communist Party were seldom granted such recognition, if not outright censored. Each Soviet Republic, as well as the Autonomous Republics (ASSRs), had a similar award that would be held beforehand by virtually every recipient of the higher title of People's Artist of the USSR.

== Performing arts ==
The title was bestowed for exceptional achievements in the performing arts in the Soviet Union. Its recipients included many of the most acclaimed composers, dancers, singers, film and theatre directors, and actors of every Soviet republic. In all, there were 1,006 recipients of the award.

The title was introduced in 1936, replacing the earlier title of 'People's Artist of the Republic'. The first recipients of the title (6 September 1936) were Konstantin Stanislavski, Vladimir Nemirovich-Danchenko, Ivan Moskvin, Antonina Nezhdanova, Boris Shchukin, Kulyash Baiseitova, and several other actors. The last persons to be honoured with the title were Sofia Pilyavskaya and Oleg Yankovsky (21 December 1991).

Originally, the title was bestowed on theatre actors, ballet dancers, and opera singers only. Gradually, it came to be bestowed upon film actors (e.g. Lyubov Orlova), composers (e.g. Arno Babajanian, Dmitri Shostakovich), violinists (e.g. David Oistrakh), pop singers (e.g. Leonid Utyosov), comedians (e.g. Arkady Raikin), and even circus performers such as Natalya Durova and Oleg Popov.

Normally, a person was named People's Artist of the USSR after the age of 40. Exceptions were made for dancers: for example, Nadezhda Pavlova, a ballet artist, received the title at the age of 28, and Malika Kalontarova, a famous Bukharian Jewish folk dancer from Tajikistan, received the title at the age of 34.

The youngest female recipients of this title were the Kazakh opera singers Kulyash Baiseitova (1936) and Halima Nosirova (1937), both at the age of 24. The youngest male recipient was the Azerbaijani baritone operatic and pop singer Muslim Magomayev (1973), at the age of 31. Among the actors, the youngest recipient was Sergei Bondarchuk (age 32). The youngest actress to receive the title was Yuri Andropov's daughter-in-law, Lyudmila Chursina, at the age of 40.

Sofia Rotaru, for example, was named Merited Artist of the Ukrainian SSR in 1973, People's Artist of the Ukrainian SSR in 1976, and People's Artist of the Moldavian SSR in 1983—an attained cumulation of People's Artist titles—and finally People's Artist of the Soviet Union in 1988, the first female pop singer to be honoured with this award and the only one with three People's Artist titles.

== Visual arts ==
The title of People's Painter of the USSR (Народный художник СССР) was awarded for exceptional achievements in certain visual arts: painting, sculpture, drawing, and photography. The lesser title of Meritorious Painter of the USSR (Заслуженный художник СССР) was also awarded for achievement in these fields.

== Other honored professions ==
- People's Architect of the USSR: Народный архитектор СССР
- People's Teacher of the USSR: Народный учитель СССР
- People's Doctor of the USSR: Народный врач СССР

== See also ==
- List of People's Artists of the USSR
- People's Artist of the RSFSR
- People's Artist of the Ukrainian SSR
- People's Artist of the Tajik SSR
- People's Artist of the Lithuanian SSR
- People's Artist of the Armenian SSR
- People's Artist of the Azerbaijan SSR (visual artists and painters)
- People's Artiste of the Azerbaijan SSR (stage and film performers)
- Merited Artist
- People's Artist
