= Sergey Filippov =

Soviet actor (1912–1990)

- Сергей Филиппов
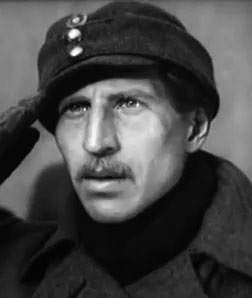
- Filippov in 1937
- Born: Sergey Nikolayevich Filippov; 24 June 1912; Saratov, Russian Empire
- Died: 19 April 1990 (aged 77); Leningrad, Russian SFSR, USSR
- Occupations: Actor, comedian
- Years active: 1933–1989
- Awards: People's Artist of the RSFSR (1974)

Sergey Nikolayevich Filippov (Russian: Серге́й Никола́евич Фили́ппов, 24 June 1912 – 19 April 1990) was a Soviet and Russian film and stage actor and comedian, best known for his parts in films Adventures of Korzinkina (1941), The Night Patrol (1957), and the adaptation of Ilf and Petrov's classic The Twelve Chairs (1971), which granted him the People's Artist of the RSFSR title in 1974.

== Biography ==
Filippov was born in Saratov. His father was a factory turner, his mother a dressmaker. Expelled from school for bad behaviour (involving, reportedly, dangerous experiments in the cabinet of a chemistry teacher), he tried several jobs (a baker’s boy, a carpenter, a turner) before joining a ballet studio, which in 1929 sent him to Moscow for further education.

Filippov enrolled into the recently formed Popular Music and Circus college which he graduated in 1933 to join the Moscow Ballet and Opera Theatre troupe. The heart problem forced Filippov to drop out, though; soon he found himself in the Saint Petersburg Comedy Theatre, led by Nikolay Akimov, where he became one of the leading actors.

=== Career in film ===
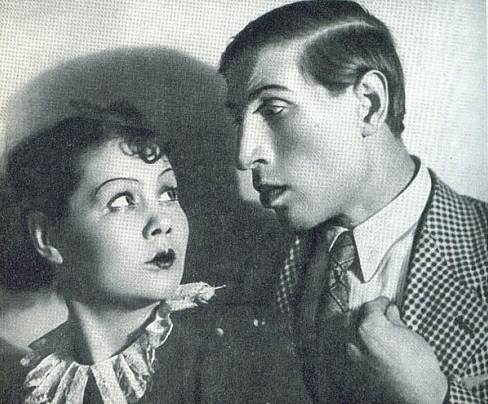
Filippov playing Rodionov in The Judgement Day, Leningrad Comedy Theatre, 1939

In 1937 Sergey Filippov made his debut on the big screen, playing a Finnish soldier in For Soviet Motherland. 1939–1940 saw Filippov cast in several major movies, playing an enemy saboteur (Zarkhi and Kheifits' Member of the Government), provision store wrecker in Kozintsev and Trauberg's The Vyborg Side, a railroad worker in Arinka by Kosheverova and Muzykant, a sailor anarchist in Sergei Yutkevich's Yakov Sverdlov. Both directors and critics praised Filippov's improvisational talent as well as plasticity and physical strength, which allowed him to perform dangerous stunts with ease.

The cultural climate in the late-1941 USSR was hardly conducive for eccentric comedy, yet Klimenty Mints's Adventures of Korzinkina with Yanina Zhejmo in the lead, became hugely popular. Filippov's part (that of a reciter, performing Lermontov's Death of Gladiator on stage, while tormented by a mouse inside his jacket) was small but unforgettable. Sergey Yutkevich in one of his articles called the actor 'an ideal buffoon'.

In the 1940s Filippov created a gallery of crooks, loafers, and eccentrics on screen. Well-versed in the history of film, he never copied his favourite comics. "I usually play the Soviet people, my contemporaries, so in each character I look for a social motif," he once said. One of his best-known parts of the time was that of a crooked shop director Polzikov in Night Patrol. Mid-1950s saw another rise in Filippov's popularity. His parts were small but memorable: silly and arrogant Almazov in The Tiger Trainer, absurdly dull Znanie lecturer in Eldar Ryazanov's Carnival Night, two-faced official Komarinsky in The Girl Without Address. In retrospect critics deplored the unadventurous way Filippov's comical gift had been exploited by directors, who often used his very presence to save otherwise mediocre scenes or films. According to actress Lyubov Tishchenko, Filippov's major grievance in his latter years was never having received a tragic role he was craving for. "I even cried as I learned that it was Yuri Nikulin who'd got the lead in When the Trees Were Tall", he once reportedly said.

In 1965 Filippov underwent a brain tumor removal. He continued to work with the same fervent zeal, though. In 1971, he starred as Kisa Vorobyaninov, next to Archil Gomiashvili's Ostap Bender in Leonid Gaidai's highly popular adaptation of Ilf and Petrov's The Twelve Chairs. This proved to be the peak of his career. In 1974 the actor was awarded the People's Artist of the RSFSR title.

== Death ==
In the 1980s Filippov's health began to decline. After his second wife, Antonina Golubeva, who was thirteen years his senior, died in 1989, he was left alone, disabled and destitute. Filippov died of lung cancer on or around 19 April 1990, aged 77. His body was not discovered until two weeks later. Lenfilm refused to subsidise any funeral service and (according to fellow comedy star Yevgeny Morgunov) it was Aleksandr Demyanenko who personally collected the sum needed. Filippov was interred in Saint Petersburg Severnoye Cemetery.

== Private life ==
Filippov's first wife was the ballet dancer Alevtina Gorinovich, with whom he fathered a son, Yuri Sergeyevich Filippov (29 September 1938 – 4 February 2020). In the early 1950s, soon after his first marriage ended in divorce, Filippov remarried, to Antonina Golubeva (1899–1989), a writer of children's books.

== Filmography ==
- The Defense of Volotchayevsk (1937) as partisan
- The Vyborg Side (1939) as storehouse wrecker
- Yakov Sverdlov (1940) as sailor anarchist
- Member of the Government (1940) as saboteur
- Musical Story (1940) as Babashkin
- We from the Urals (1943) as Andrei Stepanovich
- Kashchey the Immortal (1944) as executioner
- Hello Moscow! (1945) as Semyon Semyonovich Brykin
- A Noisy Household (1946) as Krauss
- Cinderella (1947) as Corporal
- Light over Russia (1947) as speculator
- The Boys from Leningrad (1954) as jealous husband seeing off his wife in the port
- Did We Meet Somewhere Before (1954) as unhappy photographer client
- Tamer of Tigers (1954) as Kazimir Almazov
- Twelfth Night (1955) as Fabian the servant
- Carnival Night (1956) as Comrade Nekadilov, lecturer
- Different Fortunes (1956) as Kostya, Roshchin's driver
- Honeymoon (1956) as Sergey Nikolayevich Fyodorov, ferryman
- Trista let tomu... (1956) as monk
- The Girl Without an Address (1957) as Vasily Nikodimych Komarinsky
- Gutta-percha Boy (1957) as doorman Prokhor
- Street Full of Surprises (1957) as guard
- A Girl with Guitar (1958) as Fyodor Fyodorovich Mamin-Skvortsovsky
- The Unamenables (1959) as policeman
- Be Careful, Grandma! (1960) as Innokenty Prokhorovich "Kesha" Prokhorov
- Absolutely Seriously (1961) as almanac presenter
- How Robinson Was Created (1961) as writer Moldavantsev / Robinson Crusoe
- Cherry Town (1962) as neighbor Mylkin
- Velká cesta (1962) as mayor
- The Serf Actress (1963) as Yelpidifor manager
- Summer is Over (1963) as Nikolai Yerofeyevich Bulyshev
- Little Hare (1964) as Boris Mikhailovich, theater director
- The Cook (1965) as market thief
- The New Adventures of the Elusive Avengers (1968) as Koshkin the apothecary
- The Snow Maiden (1968) as Bermyata
- Don't Grieve (1969) as Eros the barber
- Shadow (1971) as Prime minister
- The Twelve Chairs (1971) as Ippolit Matveyevich "Kisa" Vorobyaninov
- Ivan Vasilievich: Back to the Future (1973) as Swedish ambassador
- Tsarevich Prosha (1974) as Chieftain of robbers
- It Can't Be! (1975) as singer at wedding
- The Blue Bird (1976) as Pleasure of Not Understanding
- How Ivanushka the Fool Travelled in Search of Wonder (1977) as overseas doctor
- Incognito from St. Petersburg (1977) as Osip, Khlestakov's servant
- Late Meeting (1978) as Sergey Nikolayevich
- Die Fledermaus (1979) as forester / waiter
- The Nightingale (1979) as senior adviser
- Borrowing Matchsticks (1980) as Hyvärinen
- The Donkey's Hide (1982) as courtier
- In the Old Rhythms (1982) as Sergey Gennadyevich, chief of militsiya
- Sportloto-82 (1982) as station chief
- And Then Came Bumbo... (1984) as ringmaster
- Dangerous for Your Life! (1985) as gentle visitor
- The Tale about the Painter in Love (1987) as chief sage
- Heart of a Dog (1988) as Preobrazhensky's patient
- Private Detective, or Operation Cooperation (1989) as angry old man
