= Uninvented Story =

- Russian: Непридуманная история
- Directed by: Vladimir Gerasimov
- Written by: Yuli Dunsky; Valeri Frid; Ilya Zverev
- Starring: Zhanna Prokhorenko; Georgi Yepifantsev; Leonid Kuravlyov; Vitali Doronin; Valentina Berezutskaya; Svetlana Kharitonova
- Cinematography: Galina Pyshkova
- Music by: Aleksey Muravlyov
- Release date: 1964
- Country: Soviet Union
- Language: Russian

Uninvented Story (Russian: Непридуманная история) is a 1964 Soviet drama film directed by Vladimir Gerasimov.

Anatoly and Varya got married, but Anatoly was very jealous. He is jealous of her not only for work, but also for his friend. Unable to bear constant quarrels, Varya goes to the Ural.

== Plot ==
Tolia Levchukov and his young wife, Varya, both workers at a major construction site, finally manage to secure a small room for themselves. It seems life is improving, but soon they are called to move to a new site, facing the uncertainties of an unsettled place once again.

Tensions arise within the family. Anatoly resists the move, and Varya struggles to convince him that they cannot abandon their comrades during a challenging time.

Over time, Varya, who sees a friend in every person, finds it increasingly difficult to coexist with her husband. Although Anatoly is a hardworking and honest man, he prioritizes his own interests above all else, refusing to consider others’ needs.

Their strained relationship worsens as Anatoly succumbs to baseless jealousy. Even the birth of a beloved son, cherished by both parents, cannot prevent the inevitable separation.

== Cast ==
- Zhanna Prokhorenko as Varya
- Georgi Yepifantsev as Anatoly
- Leonid Kuravlyov as Kostya
- Vitali Doronin as Stepan
- Valentina Berezutskaya as Zhura
- Svetlana Kharitonova
