= The Nightingale (1979 film) =

- Russian: Соловей
- Directed by: Nadezhda Kosheverova
- Written by: Mikhail Volpin
- Based on: "The Nightingale" and "The Emperor's New Clothes" by Hans Christian Andersen
- Starring: Svetlana Smirnova; Yuri Vasilev; Aleksandr Vokach; Zinoviy Gerdt; Nikolay Trofimov
- Cinematography: Eduard Rozovsky
- Edited by: Aleksandr Bessmertniy
- Music by: Moisey Vaynberg
- Release date: 1979
- Country: Soviet Union
- Language: Russian

The Nightingale (Russian: Соловей) is a 1979 Soviet family film directed by Nadezhda Kosheverova. It is based on two stories by Hans Christian Andersen, "The Nightingale" and "The Emperor's New Clothes".

== Plot ==
The film tells about a poor journeyman who meets a wizard who instantly changes his life and he becomes the heir to the throne.

== Cast ==
- Svetlana Smirnova as Mariya
- Yuri Vasilev as Evan
- Aleksandr Vokach as Chancellor Krab (as A. Vokach)
- Zinoviy Gerdt as Boms (as Z. Gerdt)
- Nikolay Trofimov
- Aleksandr Demyanenko
- Konstantin Adashevsky
- Sergey Filippov
- Nikolay Karachentsov
- Mariya Barabanova
