= Artem Mishin =

Actor

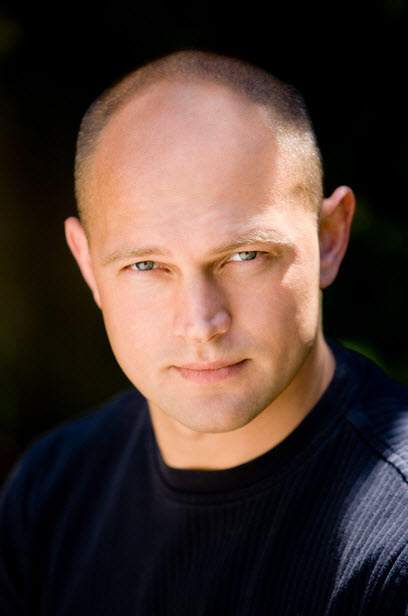
- Born: April 28, 1971 (age 55)

Artem Mishin (born April 28, 1971) is an actor, martial artist, and engineer. His acting career started at an early age thanks to his mother, a stage director and an actress, in Leningrad, the USSR. He virtually spent his childhood in a theater and a music school.

Artem's debut in film was a role in a 1984 feature movie "And Then Came Bumbo..." directed by Nadezhda Kosheverova. He shared the screen with legends of the Soviet cinematography. That experience added to his artistic passion. Artem's acting resume includes over 50 roles, mostly in film. He's also acted on stage. Artem studied and graduated from Shelton Studios in San Francisco.

As a martial artist, Artem holds a Yodan (fourth degree) black belt in Kodokan Judo, and a Sandan (third degree) black belt in Kodenkan Jujitsu. He competed Nationally and Internationally in the USSR, Russia and the USA. He used to represent Sambo (martial art) and Judo Russian National Teams. He keeps training under the former US Olympic Coach Willy Cahill.

Artem is also a mechanical engineer; he graduated from the Baltic State Technical University in St. Petersburg, Russia and has been working in Silicon Valley, CA for a number of years. He is an author of multiple inventions and numerous patents.

== External References ==
- Official website
- "Joseph Graham's Dreamlike Tale of a Gay Hustler". The New York Times. 24 September 2010.
- "Artem Mishin". Martial Arts & Action Entertainment. 23 July 2019.
- "Martial Arts Demo". YouTube.
