= Mariya Barabanova =

Soviet and Russian actress (1911–1993)

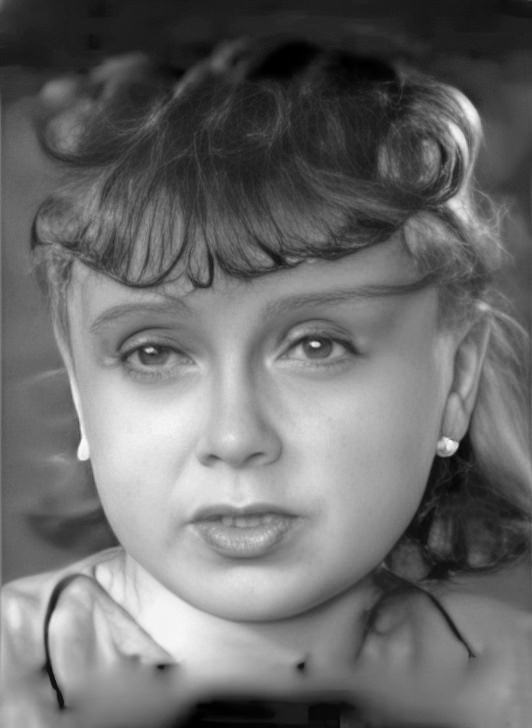
Barabanova in 1942

Mariya Pavlovna Barabanova (Russian: Мария Павловна Барабанова) (November 3, 1911, in Saint Petersburg – March 7, 1993, in Moscow) was a Soviet and Russian stage and film actress. People's Artist of the RSFSR (1991).

== Biography ==
Barabanova was born on 3 November [O.S. 21 October] 1911 in Saint Petersburg. Her father was a worker at the Putilov Factory, and her mother was a housewife.

In 1927, she was an actress at the Leningrad Proletkult Theatre and later moved to the Bryantsev Youth Theatre. She graduated from a theatre technical school only in 1937, and later from the Higher Party School under the Central Committee of the Communist Party of the Soviet Union. After completing her studies, she was appointed secretary of the party organization at the Gorky Film Studio.

From 1937 to 1942, she was an actress at the Leningrad Comedy Theatre, where she performed travesti roles; from 1945 to 1957, she was a member of the company of the National Film Actors' Theatre.

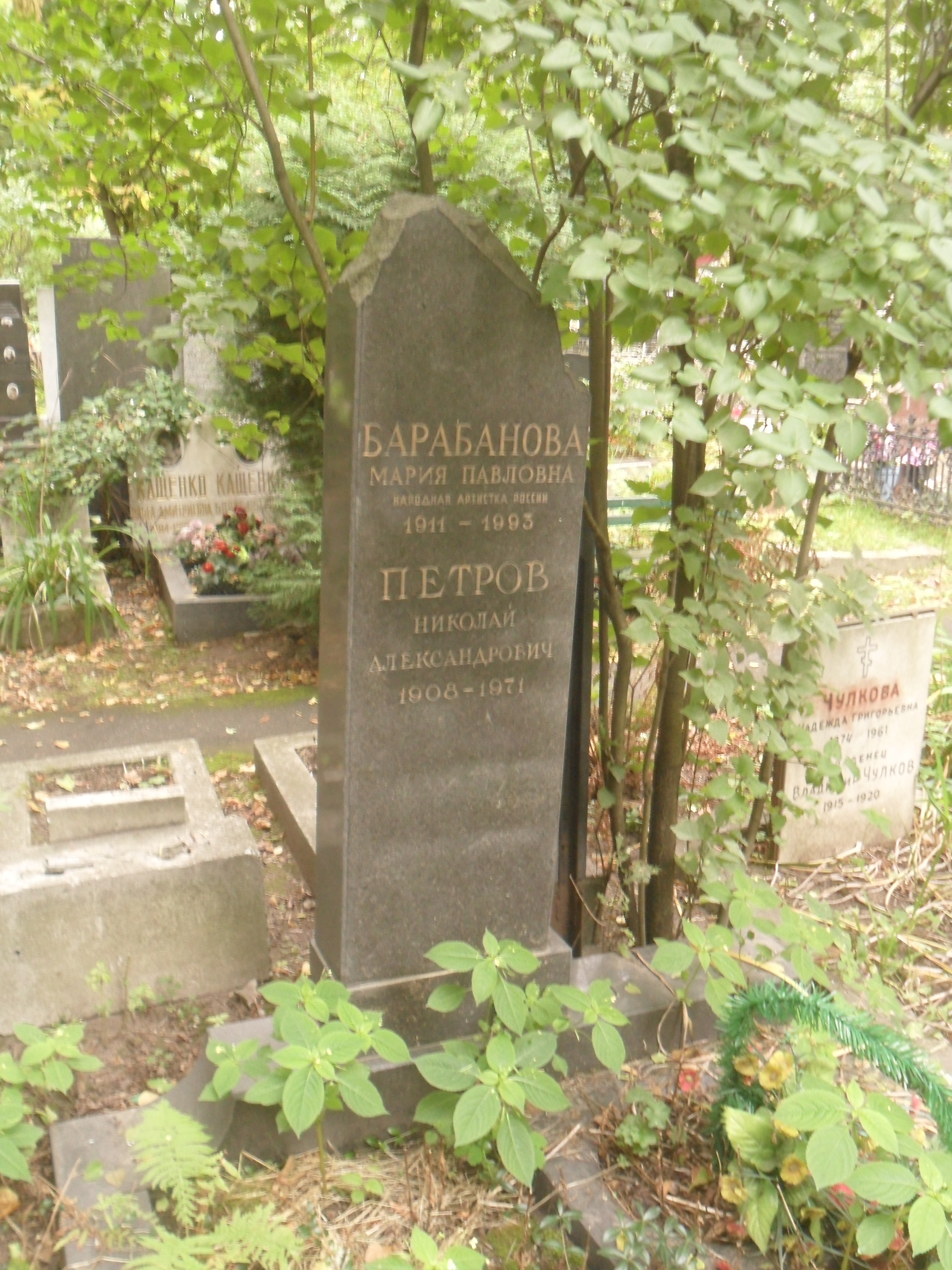
Barabanova's grave at Novodevichy Cemetery in Moscow

From 1957, she worked as an actress and director at the Gorky Film Studio. In 1964, together with Vladimir Sukhobokov, she directed the film All for You, although the film did not achieve widespread success.

She appeared in the film magazine Yeralash, as well as in a number of Soviet films. The most popular film featuring Barabanova in a leading role is The New Adventures of Puss in Boots (1957). Another notable character portrayed by the actress was the episodic role of one of the three evil old women in the film About Little Red Riding Hood (1977).

Barabanova died on 17 March 1993 in Moscow. She was buried in Section 4 of Novodevichy Cemetery.

== Filmography ==
- Late for a Date (1936) – Mail delivery girl
- The New Moscow (1938) – Olya
- Vasilisa the Beautiful (1939) – Bell-ringer
- Doctor Kalyuzhnyy (1939) – Yevgraf Timofeyevich
- We from the Urals (1943) – Kapa Khorkova
- The Russian Question (1947) – Meg
- Town People (1975) – Lady in queue
- Finist, the brave Falcon (1975) – Nenila, jolly-old lady
- How Ivanushka the Fool Travelled in Search of Wonder (1977) – Baba Yaga
- About the Little Red Riding Hood (1977) – 2nd Evil old lady
- The Nightingale (1979) – Dishwasher
- Sailors Have No Questions (1980) – Passerby
- The Donkey's Hide (1982) – Blind old lady
- Secret of the Blackbirds (1983) – Mrs. Mackenzie
- Snake Catcher (1985) – Shop spy
- After the Rain, on Thursday (1985) – First nanny
- The Tale about the Painter in Love (1987) – Baba Yagishna
- Defence Counsel Sedov (1988) – Supplicant
- Sons of Bitches (1990) – Busygin's mother

== Awards ==
- Honored Artist of the RSFSR (1970)
- People's Artist of the RSFSR (1991)
