= Spring in Moscow =

1953 film

- Directed by: Iosif Kheifits; Nadezhda Kosheverova
- Written by: Viktor Gusev (play); Nadezhda Kosheverova
- Cinematography: Sergei Ivanov; Veniamin Levitin
- Music by: Aleksey Zhivotov
- Production company: Lenfilm Studio
- Release date: 1 April 1953
- Running time: 108 minutes
- Country: Soviet Union
- Language: Russian

Spring in Moscow (Russian: Весна в Москве, romanized: Vesna v Moskve) is a 1953 Soviet musical comedy-drama film directed by Iosif Kheifits and Nadezhda Kosheverova and starring Galina Korotkevich, Vladimir Petrov and Yuri Bublikov. It was based on the first Soviet musical theatre, written by Viktor Gusev and first staged by the New Theatre in Leningrad under Nikolay Akimov.

== Cast ==
- Galina Korotkevich as Nadezhda
- Vladimir Petrov as Mikhail
- Yuri Bublikov as Yasha
- Anatoliy Kuznetsov as Ivan
- Vladimir Taskin as Akademik Aleksandr Petrov / old Rybkin
- Leo Shostak as Zdobnov, docent
- Lyudmila Ponomaryova as Kaya, daughter Rybnik
- Anatoli Abramov as Commandant of the hostel
- G. Anchits
- Aleksandra Trishko as Aunt Masha
- Agniya Elekoeva as Girl
- Nikolay Lukinov as Militiaman

== Bibliography ==
- Nina Hibbin. Eastern Europe: an illustrated guide. A. Zwemmer, 1969.
