= Shadow (1971 film) =

- Theatrical release poster
- Russian: Тень
- Directed by: Nadezhda Kosheverova
- Written by: Yuli Dunsky; Valeri Frid; Evgeny Shvarts
- Based on: "The Shadow" by Hans Christian Andersen
- Produced by: Igor Lebed
- Starring: Oleg Dal; Konstantin Adashevsky; Vladimir Etush; Sergey Filippov; Zinovy Gerdt; Lyudmila Gurchenko
- Cinematography: Konstantin Ryzhov
- Edited by: Valentina Mironova
- Music by: Andrei Eshpai
- Production company: Lenfilm
- Release date: 18 September 1971
- Running time: 95 min.
- Country: Soviet Union
- Language: Russian

Shadow (Russian: Тень, romanized: Ten) is a 1971 Soviet romantic fantasy comedy-drama directed by Nadezhda Kosheverova.

The film tells about the confrontation between a smart and kind scientist and his shadow.

== Plot ==
A scientist named Christian-Theodore arrives in a magical land where fairy tales come to life, becoming the protagonist of one himself. After meeting and falling in love with a princess, he sends his shadow to find her. However, the shadow abandons its kind and intelligent master, transforming into a deceitful and ruthless entity, calling itself Theodore-Christian. Meanwhile, Christian-Theodore becomes gravely ill without his shadow, while Theodore-Christian schemes to marry the princess and claim the throne, plotting to turn the princess against his former master.

Deceived into signing a document relinquishing his claim to the princess, Christian-Theodore watches helplessly as Theodore-Christian uses the document to convince the princess to marry him and seize power. When Christian tries to intervene at the wedding, he is arrested and brought before Theodore-Christian, who cruelly offers him the role of his shadow. Desperate, Christian reveals the truth, but no one believes him until a magical spell briefly returns Theodore-Christian to his shadow form. When the shadow reverts to its human shape, it orders Christian's execution, but in a twist of fate, both lose their heads. Terrified ministers revive Christian with water from a mystical spring, as only someone who loves him—Annunziata, the innkeeper’s daughter—can perform the act. Rejecting his shadow’s pleas for reconciliation and the throne, Christian departs the kingdom with Annunziata, choosing love and freedom over power.

== Cast ==
- Oleg Dal as Scientist / His Shadow
- Konstantin Adashevsky as Butler
- Vladimir Etush as Pietro, Annunziata's father, hotel keeper, man eater
- Sergey Filippov as Prime minister
- Zinovy Gerdt as Finance minister
- Lyudmila Gurchenko as Yulia Juli
- Andrey Mironov as Caesar Borgia, journalist, man eater
- Marina Neyolova as Annunziata
- Anastasiya Vertinskaya as Princess
- Georgy Vitsin as Doctor
- Yuri Volyntsev as episode
- Alexander Khochinsky as singer
