= The Tale About the Painter in Love =

The Tale about the Painter in Love
- Russian: Сказка про влюблённого маляра
- Directed by: Nadezhda Kosheverova
- Written by: Valeri Frid; Mikhail Volpin
- Starring: Nikolay Stotskiy; Nina Urgant; Olga Volkova; Valeriy Ivchenko; Yekaterina Golubeva
- Cinematography: Eduard Rozovsky
- Music by: Moisey Vaynberg
- Release date: 1987
- Running time: 80 minute
- Country: Soviet Union
- Language: Russian

The Tale about the Painter in Love (Russian: Сказка про влюблённого маляра) is a 1987 Soviet children's fantasy drama film directed by Nadezhda Kosheverova.

== Plot ==
The film tells about the young and cheerful painter Makar, who was invited to the king's palace. There he met a beautiful princess, whom he immediately fell in love with, but he was expelled from the palace. Makar has to go through many trials before realizing that the one he saw in the palace is not a beautiful princess at all, but an ugly maid.

== Cast ==
- Nikolay Stotskiy
- Nina Urgant
- Olga Volkova
- Valeriy Ivchenko
- Yekaterina Golubeva
- Dmitriy Iosifov
- Aleksandr Grave
- Sergey Filippov
- Georgiy Shtil
- Mariya Barabanova
