= Different Fortunes =

- Russian: Разные судьбы
- Directed by: Leonid Lukov
- Written by: Leonid Lukov; Yakov Smolyak
- Starring: Tatyana Piletskaya; Yulian Panich; Georgi Yumatov; Lev Sverdlin; Olga Zhizneva
- Music by: Nikita Bogoslovsky
- Release date: 1956
- Running time: 101 min.
- Country: Soviet Union
- Language: Russian

Different Fortunes (Russian: Разные судьбы) is a 1956 Soviet romantic drama film directed by Leonid Lukov.

The film is set in post-war Leningrad and tells the story of young adults navigating a tangled web of unrequited love, heartbreak, loyalty, and self-discovery.

== Plot ==
A group of young Leningraders, fresh out of school, navigate the complexities of adulthood and love. Sonya is in love with Styopa, but he has his heart set on Tanya, who instead favors Fedya. Rejected, Styopa moves to a distant Siberian city, where he works at a factory and enrolls in an evening institute. Devoted to him, Sonya follows him to Siberia.

Back in Leningrad, Tanya and Fedya’s relationship falters. Beautiful but selfish, Tanya pursues a romance with a famous composer, Roshchin, in hopes of improving her station in life. However, when Roshchin faces setbacks, he abandons her without hesitation. Meanwhile, Styopa begins to appreciate Sonya’s loyalty and marries her.

When Fedya falls gravely ill, Styopa and Sonya send financial aid through their friend Vera, who is traveling to Leningrad. Vera and Fedya grow close, and as Fedya prepares to leave for Siberia to reunite with friends, Vera accompanies him to the train station. There, they encounter Tanya, who overhears their heartfelt conversation and realizes that Fedya has fallen in love with Vera. Left alone, Tanya faces the consequences of her choices and the emptiness of her selfish pursuits.

== Cast ==
- Tatyana Piletskaya as Tanya Ogneva
- Yulian Panich as Fedya Morozov
- Georgi Yumatov as Styopa Ogurtsov
- Tatyana Konyukhova as Sonya Orlova
- Valentina Ushakova as Vera Zubova
- Lev Sverdlin as Nikolai Kapitonovich, Tanya's father
- Olga Zhizneva as Yelena Semyonovna, Tanya's mother
- Bruno Freindlich as Igor Stepanovich Roshchin, composer
- Sergey Filippov as Kostya, Roshchin's driver
- Vsevolod Sanayev as Vladimir Sergeyevich Zhukov, party organizer
- Sergei Blinnikov as Yegor Petrovich Zubov
- Vladimir Dorofeyev as Ivan Romanovich Sergeychuk
- Anna Kolomiyitseva as Lyudmila Ivanovna, Yegor Zubov's wife
- Liliya Maksimova as Masha, Roshchin's wife
- Vera Orlova as Nina Nikiforovna, Morozov's neighbor
- Muza Krepkogorskaya as Galya, Sonya's neighbor
- Irina Zarubina as Styopa Ogurtsov's aunt
