= Viktor Gusev =

Viktor Mikhaylovich Gusev (Russian: Ви́ктор Миха́йлович Гу́сев, IPA: [ˈvʲiktər mʲɪˈxajləvʲɪdʑ ˈɡusʲɪf]; 30 January 1909 – 23 January 1944) wrote lyrics to accompany several patriotic Soviet military tunes, including 'Polyushko Pole' and 'March of the Artillerymen'.

He wrote the play Spring in Moscow, which was the first Soviet musical theatre, staged by New Theatre under Nikolay Akimov in the early 1950s. It was later made into a film of the same name.
