= In the Old Rhythms =

- Russian: В старых ритмах
- Directed by: Mikhail Yershov
- Written by: Dmitri Ivanov; Vladimir Trifonov
- Starring: Semyon Morozov; Anastasiya Glez; Nikolay Trofimov; Zoltán Loker; Aleksandr Zakharov
- Cinematography: Nikolai Zhilin
- Edited by: Zinaida Shejneman
- Music by: Oleg Khromushin
- Release date: 1982
- Running time: 90 minute
- Country: Soviet Union
- Language: Russian

In the Old Rhythms (Russian: В старых ритмах) is a 1982 Soviet musical comedy film directed by Mikhail Yershov.

== Plot ==
The film takes place in the 30s of the 20th century in Leningrad. Nikita Fedotov could not enter the conservatory and jumped into the Neva, the policeman Koshkin was able to save him and offered to work in the criminal investigation department. Nikita agreed.

== Cast ==
- Semyon Morozov as Nikita Fedotov
- Anastasiya Glez
- Nikolay Trofimov as Shtykov
- Zoltán Loker
- Aleksandr Zakharov
- Sergey Filippov
- Mikhail Shchetinin
- Aleksey Kozhevnikov
- Mikhail Aptekman
- Tatyana Piletskaya
