= Shadows (1953 film) =

- Directed by: Nikolay Akimov; Nadezhda Kosheverova
- Written by: Moses Magid; Lev Sokolsky
- Produced by: Mikhail Gendenshteyn
- Starring: Valentin Lebedev; Vladimir Petrov; Galina Korotkevich
- Cinematography: Moses Magid; Lev Sokolsky
- Music by: Dmitry Tolstoy
- Production company: Lenfilm Studio
- Release date: 1953
- Running time: 105 minutes
- Country: Soviet Union
- Language: Russian

Shadows (Russian: Тени) is a 1953 Soviet romantic drama film directed by Nikolay Akimov and Nadezhda Kosheverova and starring Valentin Lebedev, Vladimir Petrov and Galina Korotkevich. On the eponymous play by Saltykov-Shchedrin.

== Plot ==
In the 1860s, from the province of St. Petersburg comes the liberal-minded young officer Bobyrev. He hopes under the protection of his schoolmate Klaverova, who became a general, to make a career. Gen. happily defines Bobyrev in his office, and already builds plans, both through the beautiful Sophia, wife Bobyrev will wage a successful struggle with opponents and influence voluptuous Minister Tarakanov.

== Cast ==
- Valentin Lebedev as Pyotr Sergeich Klaverov
- Vladimir Petrov as Nikolay Dmitrich Bobyrev
- Galina Korotkevich as Sofya Aleksandrovna
- Vera Budreyko as Olga Dmitriyevna
- Yuri Bublikov as Pavel Nikolaich Naboykin
- Anatoli Abramov as Ivan Mikheich Svistikov
- Aleksandr Gyultsen as Young Tarakanov
- Ovsey Kagan as Savva Semyonych Obtyazhnov
- Dmitry Bessonov as Kamarzhintsev
- Evgeniy Gvozdev as Narukavnikov
- Vladimir Taskin as Tarakanov
- Aleksandr Estrin as Hairdresser
- Aleksey Rozanov as Courier
- Berta Vinogradova as Klara

== Bibliography ==
- Natalja Čemodanova & Alfred Krautz. International Directory of Cinematographers, Set-And Costume Designers in Film: Soviet Union. Saur, 1995.
