= Lidiya Sukharevskaya =

Soviet actress

Lidiya Sukharevskaya PAU
- Лидия Сухаревская
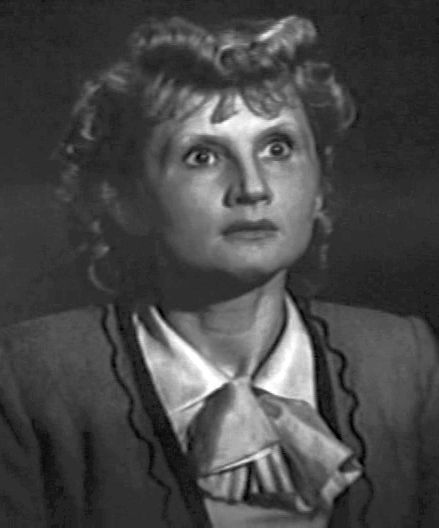
- Lidiya Sukharevskaya in We from the Urals (1943)
- Born: 30 August 1909; Petergof, Russian Empire
- Died: 10 October 1991 (aged 82); Moscow, RSFSR, Soviet Union
- Occupation: Actress
- Years active: 1939–1981
- Spouse: Boris Tenin

Lidiya Petrovna Sukharevskaya (Russian: Ли́дия Петро́вна Сухаре́вская; 30 August 1909 – 11 October 1991) was a Soviet stage actress and playwright renowned for her work with Nikolay Akimov and Andrey Goncharov. Her frequent stage partner was Boris Tenin, her husband. She also appeared in 14 films between 1939 and 1981. Sukharevskaya was named a People's Artist of the USSR in 1990.

== Selected filmography ==
- We from the Urals (1943)
- Encounter at the Elbe (1949)
- Girl No. 217 (1945)
- Mussorgsky (1950)
- Rimsky-Korsakov (1952)
- The Star (1953)
- Kain XVIII (1963)
- Anna Karenina (1967)
