= The Twelve Chairs (1971 film) =

- Directed by: Leonid Gaidai
- Written by: Vladlen Bakhnov; Leonid Gaidai
- Based on: The Twelve Chairs by Ilf and Petrov
- Starring: Archil Gomiashvili; Sergey Filippov; Mikhail Pugovkin; Natalya Krachkovskaya
- Narrated by: Rostislav Plyatt
- Cinematography: Sergei Poluyanov; Valery Shuvalov
- Music by: Aleksandr Zatsepin
- Production company: Mosfilm
- Release date: 21 June 1971
- Running time: 159 minutes
- Country: Soviet Union
- Language: Russian

The Twelve Chairs (Russian: 12 стульев, romanized: Dvenadtsat stulyev) is a 1971 Soviet comedy film directed by Leonid Gaidai. It is an adaptation of Ilf and Petrov's 1928 novel The Twelve Chairs.

== Plot ==
Ostap Bender, shortly after arriving in Stargorod, meets Ippolit "Kisa" Vorobyaninov, a Marshal of Nobility who is looking for a set of 12 chairs that belonged to his mother-in-law, who on her deathbed confesses of hiding diamonds in one of them. However, the confession is overheard by Father Fyodor, who also begins looking for them. Ostap and Kisa decide to go on the search together, traveling all around Russia and having a series of misadventures.

== Cast ==
- Archil Gomiashvili as Ostap Bender (voiced by Yuri Sarantsev; singing voice by Valeri Zolotukhin; in some scenes speaks in his own voice)
- Sergey Filippov as Ippolit Matveyevich "Kisa" Vorobyaninov
- Mikhail Pugovkin as father Fyodor, priest
- Natalya Krachkovskaya as Madame Gritsatsuyeva
- Igor Yasulovich as Ernest Shchukin, engineer
- Natalya Vorobyova as Ellochka Shchukina, Ernest Shchukin's wife
- Klara Rumyanova as Katerina Aleksandrovna, father Fyodor's wife
- Natalya Varley as Yelizaveta "Liza" Petrovna (voiced by Nadezhda Rumyantseva)
- Georgy Vitsin as fitter Mechnikov
- Savely Kramarov as one-eyed chess player
- Radner Muratov as first chess player
- Viktor Pavlov as Kolya, Liza's husband
- Gotlib Roninson as chairman Kislyarsky
- Roman Filippov as poet Nikifor Lyapis-Trubetskoy
- Grigory Shpigel as Aleksandr Yakovlevich
- Yuri Nikulin as janitor Tikhon
- Glikeriya Bogdanova-Chesnokova as Yelena Stanislavovna Bour
- Vladimir Etush as Andrei Bruns
- Nina Grebeshkova as Musik, Bruns' wife
- Alexander Khvylya as Vakkhanyuk
- Nina Agapova as soloist of theater "Kolumb"
- Rina Zelyonaya as editor of youth problem magazine "Groom and Bride"
- Irina Murzaeva as guide of furniture craftsmanship museum
- Yevdokiya Urusova as Klavdiya Ivanovna Petukhova, Kisa's mother-in-law
- Erast Garin as theater critic
- Leonid Gaidai as Varfolomey Korobeinikov (uncredited)
- Rostislav Plyatt as Narrator (uncredited)
- Stanislav Sadalsky as fireman in theater "Kolumb" (uncredited)
