= And Then Came Bumbo... =

- Russian: И вот пришёл Бумбо…
- Directed by: Nadezhda Kosheverova
- Written by: Yuli Dunsky; Valeri Frid; Aleksandr Kuprin
- Starring: Oleg Basilashvili; Valeriy Zolotukhin; Tatyana Pelttser; Svetlana Nemolyaeva; Zinoviy Gerdt
- Cinematography: Eduard Rozovsky
- Music by: Vladimir Deshov; Moisey Vaynberg
- Production company: Lenfilm
- Release date: 1984
- Running time: 78 min.
- Country: Soviet Union
- Language: Russian

And Then Came Bumbo... (Russian: И вот пришёл Бумбо…, romanized: I vot prishyol Bumbo...) is a 1984 Soviet family film directed by Nadezhda Kosheverova.

The film tells about a sick girl, Alexandra, who asks her father to get her a living elephant in order to regain interest in life and cure her.

== Plot ==
The film is set in Saint Petersburg at the turn of the 19th and 20th centuries. When Alexandra, the daughter of a renowned doctor, falls ill, even the most experienced city doctors are unable to diagnose or cure her. One day, her father, Ilya Mitrofanovich, encounters an old acquaintance, Kostya, a former medical student now working for a traveling circus. Kostya visits Alexandra and tells her about Bumbo the elephant, sparking her desire to meet him. She asks her father to arrange for the elephant to visit. Kostya suggests that Ilya Mitrofanovich treat his daughter by rekindling her interest in life. However, the circus director refuses to bring the elephant to their home, fearing a fine. Disheartened, Ilya Mitrofanovich’s hopes wane, but with Kostya's encouragement, Ahmet, a circus performer, brings Bumbo to see Alexandra, who soon recovers. Unfortunately, the circus director fires Kostya and Ahmet, as the police have fined him for allowing the elephant on the streets without a permit. Kostya, Ahmet, and Bumbo head south to join another circus. Ilya Mitrofanovich and Alexandra make it to the station just in time to bid farewell to their circus friends.

== Cast ==
- Oleg Basilashvili
- Valeriy Zolotukhin
- Tatyana Pelttser
- Svetlana Nemolyaeva
- Zinoviy Gerdt
- Aleksandr Pankratov-Chyorny
- Sergey Filippov
- Natasha Shinakova
- Sergei Parshin
- Georgy Shtil
