= Cain XVIII =

- Directed by: Nadezhda Kosheverova; Mikhail Shapiro
- Written by: Evgeny Shvarts (play); Nikolai Erdman
- Produced by: Lenfilm
- Starring: Erast Garin; Aleksandr Demyanenko; Yuri Lyubimov
- Cinematography: Eduard Rozovsky
- Music by: Antonio Spadaveccia
- Release date: 1963
- Running time: 94 minutes
- Country: Soviet Union
- Language: Russian

Cain XVIII (Russian: Каин XVIII) is a 1963 film from the Soviet Union, adapted from Evgeny Shvarts' play, Two friends. The Soviet film industry reported that 21.7 million spectators saw the film.

== Plot ==
A famous inventor ("The Professor") creates an extra-powerful weapon—an explosive mosquito. King Cain XVIII dreams of conquering the world and marrying the princess, but she is also loved by Yan, a vagrant musician. Yan's love leads him to surmount many obstacles and simultaneously thwart the insidious plans of the king.

== Cast ==
- Erast Garin as King Cain XVIII
- Lidiya Sukharevskaya as Queen Vlasta
- Mikhail Zharov as Minister of War
- Yuri Lyubimov as First Minister
- Alexander Demyanenko as Yan
- Stanislav Khitrov as Jean
- Rina Zelyonaya as Foreign Governess
- Alexandr Beniaminov as Professor
- Bruno Freindlich as Chief of Secret Police
- Georgi Vitsin as Freelance Hangman
- Boris Chirkov as Lavatory Worker
- Igor Dmitriev as General
- Glikeriya Bogdanova-Chesnokova as First Dame
- Marina Polbentseva as Professor's Wife
- Nikolay Trofimov as Agent 214
- Anatoly Korolkevich as Agent with a carnation
