= Ivan Arkadin =

Soviet actor

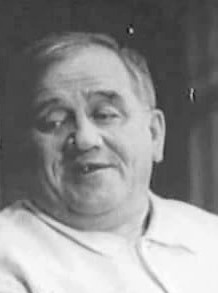
- Born: Ivan Arkadin; 1878
- Died: 1942 (aged 63–64)
- Occupation: Actor
- Years active: 1924–1938

Ivan Ivanovich Arkadin (Russian: Ива́н Ива́нович Арка́дин) was a Soviet actor. Honoured Worker of the Arts Industry of the RSFSR.

== Biography ==
In 1908 Ivan began to play in the drama theater of P.P. Gaideburov. In 1914-1938 he worked at the Moscow Chamber Theater, and after that at the State Central Youth Theater.

== Selected filmography ==
- 1930 — St. Jorgen's Day
- 1936 — The Last Night
- 1938 — Doctor Aybolit
