= We from the Urals =

- Directed by: Lev Kuleshov; Aleksandra Khokhlova
- Written by: Yevgeny Pomeshchikov; Nikolai Rozhkov
- Starring: Aleksey Konsovsky; Yanina Zhejmo
- Music by: Sergei Pototsky
- Production company: Soyuzdetfilm
- Release date: 1943
- Running time: 76 minutes
- Country: Soviet Union
- Language: Russian

We from the Urals (Russian: Мы с Урала) is a 1943 Soviet drama film directed by Lev Kuleshov and Aleksandra Khokhlova.

== Plot ==
Two teenagers working after school in a large military factory in the Urals rush to the front lines of war, where a nurse has left the sister of one of them. Their everyday life, love and youth make up the plot of the film.

== Cast ==
- Aleksey Konsovsky as Kuzya Zavarin
- Aleksandr Mikhailov as Vanya Tomakurov
- Yanina Zhejmo as Vera Zavarina
- Georgy Millyar as grandfather Tomakurov
- Gleb Florinsky as Major Ignatyev
- Maria Vinogradova as Sonya
- Mariya Barabanova as Kapa Khorkova
- Pyotr Galadzhev as factory painter
- Nikolai Grabbe as Pavka Drozdov
- Sergey Komarov as Yuri Pavlovich
- Sergey Martinson as Head of the dancing group
- Lidiya Sukharevskaya as Maria Vasilyevna
- Sergey Filippov as Andrei Stepanovich
- Ivan Ryzhov as Ivan Dmitriyevich (uncredited)
