= On the Way to Berlin =

- Russian: На пути в Берлин
- Directed by: Mikhail Yershov
- Written by: Yuriy Chulyukin; Kirill Rapoport; Boris Vasilev
- Starring: Vasiliy Krasnov; Nikolay Trofimov; Gennadi Karnovich-Valua; Stepan Krylov; Yuri Fisenko
- Cinematography: Viktor Karasyov; Nikolai Zhilin
- Edited by: Lyudmila Pechieva
- Music by: Venyamin Basner
- Release date: 1969
- Running time: 92 minute
- Country: Soviet Union
- Language: Russian

On the Way to Berlin (Russian: На пути в Берлин, romanized: Na puti v Berlin) is a 1969 Soviet World War II film directed by Mikhail Yershov.

== Plot ==
During the dangerous last days of WWII, a Red Army soldier tries to set up an occupation government on the outskirts of Berlin, which has not yet surrendered.

== Cast ==
- Vasiliy Krasnov as Aleksey Petrov
- Nikolay Trofimov as Ivan Zaytsev
- Gennadi Karnovich-Valua as Sergey Konovalov
- Stepan Krylov as Council of War Member
- Yuri Fisenko as Tolya
- Sergey Dvoretskiy as Volodya Kravchenko
- Geliy Sysoev as Krutikov
- Nikolay Kuzmin as Gabidullin
- Pavel Pervushin as Pyotr Lukich
- Mikhail Yekaterininsky as Leonid Sergeyevich
- Nikolai Fyodortsov as Battalion Commander (as Nikolay Fedortsov)
