= The Last Night (1936 film) =

- Russian: Последняя ночь
- Directed by: Yuli Raizman
- Written by: Yevgeny Gabrilovich; Yuli Raizman
- Starring: Aleksey Konsovsky; Tatiana Okunevskaya; Osip Abdulov
- Music by: Alexander Veprik
- Release date: 1936
- Country: Soviet Union
- Language: Russian

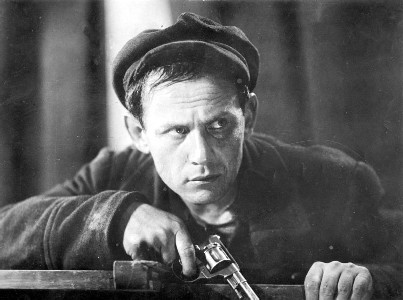
A frame from the movie The Last Night, 1936. Nikolai Dorokhin in the role of Peter.

The Last Night (Russian: Последняя ночь) is a 1936 Soviet drama film directed by Yuli Raizman.

The film takes place on the last night of the Russian Empire. The film intertwines the fate of the family of the capitalist Leontyev and the worker Zakharkin, whose children are involved in organizing the worker's uprising.

== Plot ==
On an October night, during a ball, high school students and officers mock the love of "the cook's son," Kuzma Zakharkin, for Lena, the daughter of factory owner Leontyev. Their revelry is abruptly interrupted by the sound of cannon fire as an armed workers' uprising begins in the city.

That same night, two figures arrive in Moscow: sailor Pyotr, the eldest son of worker Zakharkin, who has been sent from Petrograd to assist the Moscow Revolutionary Committee, and Alexei Leontyev, the factory owner's son, disguised in civilian clothing.

In their proletarian apartment, old man Zakharkin and his son Ilya listen as Pyotr recounts the storming of the Winter Palace. The worker’s family joins the revolutionary headquarters, where Revolutionary Committee Chairman Mikhailov appoints Pyotr commander of a Red Guard detachment. Pyotr’s task is to isolate the cadets' Alexandrov Military School from the Bryansk Railway Station. The detachment seizes a high school, where old man Zakharkin stands guard with a Berdan rifle over the captured factory owner, Leontyev.

Meanwhile, Kuzma, searching for his father and brothers, accidentally finds himself among the cadets. Attempting to return to his comrades, he is killed. The cadet detachment, led by Alexei Leontyev, attacks the Red Guard positions and retakes the high school. During the assault, old man Zakharkin is killed by a bullet from his former employer.

Pyotr is tasked by the Revolutionary Committee to mobilize the 193rd Regiment from the Khomovniki Barracks. As Alexei Leontyev tries to sway the wavering soldiers to his side, a group of Red Guards arrives in the barracks courtyard. Ilya Zakharkin is killed by an officer. Pyotr delivers a passionate Bolshevik speech, rallying the soldiers to join the fight against the White Army. The combined forces of the Red Guards and soldiers capture the Bryansk Railway Station, taking Alexei Leontyev among the prisoners.

A train arrives at the station carrying soldiers sent to support the counterrevolution. Instead, they join forces with the uprising. Led by Chairman Mikhailov, the Red Guards march forward to face new battles.

== Starring ==
- Ivan Pelttser as Yegor Zakharkin
- Mariya Yarotskaya as Zakharkin's Wife
- Nikolai Dorokhin as Pyotr Zakharkin
- Aleksey Konsovsky as Kuzma Zakharkin
- Vladimir Popov as Ilya Zakharkin
- Nikolai Rybnikov as Pyotr Leontyev
- Sergei Vecheslov as Aleksei Leontyev
- Tatiana Okunevskaya as Lena Leontyeva
- Leonid Knyazev as Shura Leontyev
- Mikhail Kholodov as Officer Soskin
- Vladimir Gribkov as Mikhailov
- Ivan Arkadin as Semikhatov
- Osip Abdulov as Colonel
- Vladimir Dorofeyev as Stationmaster (uncredited)
