= March of the Artillerymen =

1943 Soviet marching song

The "March of the Artillerymen" (Russian: Марш артиллеристов, romanized: Marsh artilleristov), also known as the "March of Stalin's Artillerymen", is a 1943 Soviet marching song, written in Russian by Viktor Gusev and composed by Tikhon Khrennikov.

== Lyrics ==
=== Original 1943 version ===
Russian original

Горит в сердцах у нас любовь к земле родимой,
Мы в смертный бой идём за честь родной страны.
Пылают города, охваченные дымом,
Гремит в седых лесах суровый бог войны.
Артиллеристы, Сталин дал приказ!
Артиллеристы, зовёт Отчизна нас!
Из сотен тысяч батарей
За слезы наших матерей,
За нашу Родину — огонь! Огонь!

Узнай, родная мать, узнай жена-подруга,
Узнай, далекий дом и вся моя семья,
Что бьет и жжет врага стальная наша вьюга,
Что волю мы несем в родимые края!
Артиллеристы, Сталин дал приказ!
Артиллеристы, зовёт Отчизна нас!
Из сотен тысяч батарей
За слезы наших матерей,
За нашу Родину — огонь! Огонь!

Пробьет победы час, придет конец походам.
Но прежде чем уйти к домам своим родным,
В честь нашего Вождя, в честь нашего народа
Мы радостный салют в победный час дадим!
Артиллеристы, Сталин дал приказ!
Артиллеристы, зовёт Отчизна нас!
Из сотен тысяч батарей
За слезы наших матерей,
За нашу Родину — огонь! Огонь!

Romanization of Russian

Gorit v serdcah u nas ljubovj k zemle rodimoj,
Idem my v smertnyj boj za čestj rodnoj strany,
Pylajut goroda, ohvačennyje dymom,
Gremit v sedyh lesah surovyj bog vojny.
Artilleristy, Stalin dal prikaz!
Artilleristy, zovjot Otčizna nas!
Iz soten tysjač batarej
Za slezy naših materej,
Za našu Rodinu — ogonj! Ogonj!

Uznaj, rodnaja matj, uznaj žena-podruga,
Uznaj, dalekij dom i vsja moja semjja,
Čto bjet i žžet vraga staljnaja naša vjjuga,
Čto volju my nesem v rodimyje kraja!
Artilleristy, Stalin dal prikaz!
Artilleristy, zovjot Otčizna nas!
Iz soten tysjač batarej
Za slezy naših materej,
Za našu Rodinu — ogonj! Ogonj!

Probjet pobedy čas, pridet konec pohodam.
No prežde čem ujti k domam svoim rodnym,
V čestj našego Voždja, v čestj našego naroda
My radostnyj saljut v pobednyj čas dadim!
Artilleristy, Stalin dal prikaz!
Artilleristy, zovjot Otčizna nas!
Iz soten tysjač batarej
Za slezy naših materej,
Za našu Rodinu — ogonj! Ogonj!

English translation

We love our homeland faithfully in our hearts.
We battle to death for our beloved motherland.
Cities are now burning, with all covered in smoke.
The god of war is rumbling in the dark forests.
Artillerymen, Stalin gave the order.
Artillerymen, the motherland calls us.
With the one-hundred-thousands of batteries,
for the tears of our mothers,
for our motherland — fire! Fire!

Do you know, my mother, my darling, and all my friends,
and the distant family who worry about me,
what beats the enemy is our great armoury
what we will bring to homeland is victory.
Artillerymen, Stalin gave the order.
Artillerymen, the motherland calls us.
With the one-hundred-thousands of batteries,
for the tears of our mothers,
for our motherland — fire! Fire!

The day of victory, the end of the war must come.
But before we return to our beloved homes,
in honour of our Leader, in honour of the people
we will salute in the hour of victory.
Artillerymen, Stalin gave the order.
Artillerymen, the motherland calls us.
With the one-hundred-thousands of batteries,
for the tears of our mothers,
for our motherland — fire! Fire!

=== 1954 version ===
Due to De-Stalinization after the death of Stalin in 1953, some of the lyrics have been changed to discourage the worship of Stalin.

Russian original

Горит в сердцах у нас любовь к земле родимой,
Идем мы в смертный бой за честь родной страны.
Пылают города, охваченные дымом,
Гремит в седых лесах суровый бог войны.
Артиллеристы, точный дан приказ!
Артиллеристы, зовёт Отчизна нас!
Из многих тысяч батарей
За слезы наших матерей,
За нашу Родину — огонь! Огонь!

Узнай, родная мать, узнай жена-подруга,
Узнай, далекий дом и вся моя семья,
Что бьет и жжет врага стальная наша вьюга,
Что волю мы несем в родимые края!
Артиллеристы, точный дан приказ!
Артиллеристы, зовёт Отчизна нас!
Из многих тысяч батарей
За слезы наших матерей,
За нашу Родину — огонь! Огонь!

Пробьет победы час, придет конец походам.
Но прежде чем уйти к домам своим родным,
В честь армии родной, в честь нашего народа
Мы радостный салют в победный час дадим!
Артиллеристы, точный дан приказ!
Артиллеристы, зовёт Отчизна нас!
Из многих тысяч батарей
За слезы наших матерей,
За нашу Родину — огонь! Огонь!

Romanization of Russian

Gorit v serdcah u nas ljubovj k zemle rodimoj,
Idem my v smertnyj boj za čestj rodnoj strany,
Pylajut goroda, ohvačennyje dymom,
Gremit v sedyh lesah surovyj bog vojny.
Artilleristy, točnyj dan prikaz!
Artilleristy, zovjot Otčizna nas!
Iz mnogih tysjač batarej
Za slezy naših materej,
Za našu Rodinu — ogonj! Ogonj!

Uznaj, rodnaja matj, uznaj žena-podruga,
Uznaj, dalekij dom i vsja moja semjja,
Čto bjet i žžet vraga staljnaja naša vjjuga,
Čto volju my nesem v rodimyje kraja!
Artilleristy, točnyj dan prikaz!
Artilleristy, zovjot Otčizna nas!
Iz mnogih tysjač batarej
Za slezy naših materej,
Za našu Rodinu — ogonj! Ogonj!

Probjet pobedy čas, pridet konec pohodam.
No prežde čem ujti k domam svoim rodnym,
V čestj armii rodnoj, v čestj našego naroda
My radostnyj saljut v pobednyj čas dadim!
Artilleristy, točnyj dan prikaz!
Artilleristy, zovjot Otčizna nas!
Iz mnogih tysjač batarej
Za slezy naših materej,
Za našu Rodinu — ogonj! Ogonj!

English translation

We love our homeland faithfully in our hearts.
We battle to death for our beloved motherland.
Cities are now burning, with all covered in smoke.
The god of war is rumbling in the dark forests.
Artillerymen, orders are exact.
Artillerymen, the motherland calls us.
With the thousands of batteries,
for the tears of our mothers,
for our motherland — Fire! Fire!

Do you know, my mother, my darling, and all my friends,
and the distant family who worry about me,
what beats the enemy is our great armoury
what we will bring to homeland is victory.
Artillerymen, orders are exact.
Artillerymen, the motherland calls us.
With the thousands of batteries,
for the tears of our mothers,
for our motherland — fire! Fire!

The day of victory, the end of the war must come.
But before we return to our beloved homes,
in honour of army, in honour of the people
we will salute in the hour of victory.
Artillerymen, orders are exact.
Artillerymen, the motherland calls us.
With the thousands of batteries,
for the tears of our mothers,
for our motherland — fire! Fire!

=== 1970s version ===
Under the rule of Brezhnev, the Communist Party was emphasized, so the lyrics changed again.

Russian original

Горит в сердцах у нас любовь к земле родимой,
Идем мы в смертный бой за честь родной страны.
Пылают города, охваченные дымом,
Гремит в седых лесах суровый бог войны.
Артиллеристы, точный дан приказ!
Артиллеристы, зовёт Отчизна нас!
Из многих тысяч батарей
За слезы наших матерей,
За нашу Родину — огонь! Огонь!

Узнай, родная мать, узнай жена-подруга,
Узнай, далекий дом и вся моя семья,
Что бьет и жжет врага стальная наша вьюга,
Что волю мы несем в родимые края!
Артиллеристы, точный дан приказ!
Артиллеристы, зовёт Отчизна нас!
Из многих тысяч батарей
За слезы наших матерей,
За нашу Родину — огонь! Огонь!

Пробьет победы час, придет конец походам.
Но прежде чем уйти к домам своим родным,
В честь партии родной, в честь нашего народа
Мы радостный салют в победный час дадим!
Артиллеристы, точный дан приказ!
Артиллеристы, зовёт Отчизна нас!
Из многих тысяч батарей
За слезы наших матерей,
За нашу Родину — огонь! Огонь!

Romanization of Russian

Gorit v serdcah u nas ljubovj k zemle rodimoj,
Idem my v smertnyj boj za čestj rodnoj strany,
Pylajut goroda, ohvačennyje dymom,
Gremit v sedyh lesah surovyj bog vojny.
Artilleristy, točnyj dan prikaz!
Artilleristy, zovjot Otčizna nas!
Iz mnogih tysjač batarej
Za slezy naših materej,
Za našu Rodinu — ogonj! Ogonj!

Uznaj, rodnaja matj, uznaj žena-podruga,
Uznaj, dalekij dom i vsja moja semjja,
Čto bjet i žžet vraga staljnaja naša vjjuga,
Čto volju my nesem v rodimyje kraja!
Artilleristy, točnyj dan prikaz!
Artilleristy, zovjot Otčizna nas!
Iz mnogih tysjač batarej
Za slezy naših materej,
Za našu Rodinu — ogonj! Ogonj!

Probjet pobedy čas, pridet konec pohodam.
No prežde čem ujti k domam svoim rodnym,
V čestj partii rodnoj, v čestj našego naroda
My radostnyj saljut v pobednyj čas dadim!
Artilleristy, točnyj dan prikaz!
Artilleristy, zovjot Otčizna nas!
Iz mnogih tysjač batarej
Za slezy naših materej,
Za našu Rodinu — ogonj! Ogonj!

English translation

We love our homeland faithfully in our hearts.
We battle to death for our beloved motherland.
Cities are now burning, with all covered in smoke.
The god of war is rumbling in the dark forests.
Artillerymen, orders are exact.
Artillerymen, the motherland calls us.
With the thousands of batteries,
for the tears of our mothers,
for our motherland — fire! Fire!

Do you know, my mother, my darling, and all my friends,
and the distant family who worry about me,
what beats the enemy is our great armoury
what we will bring to homeland is victory.
Artillerymen, orders are exact.
Artillerymen, the motherland calls us.
With the thousands of batteries,
for the tears of our mothers,
for our motherland — fire! Fire!

The day of victory, the end of the war must come.
But before we return to our beloved homes,
in honour of party, in honour of the people
we will salute in the hour of victory.
Artillerymen, orders are exact.
Artillerymen, the motherland calls us.
With the thousands of batteries,
for the tears of our mothers,
for our motherland — fire! Fire!

== See also ==
- "Artilleryman's Song" – a similar march composed by the Pokrass brothers.
