= Tsarevich Prosha =

- Russian: Царевич Проша
- Directed by: Nadezhda Kosheverova
- Written by: Mikhail Volpin
- Starring: Sergey Martynov; Valeriy Zolotukhin; Tatyana Shestakova; Yevgeniy Tilicheev; Valeri Nosik
- Cinematography: Eduard Rozovsky; Vladimir Vasilyev
- Edited by: Valentina Mironova
- Music by: Moisey Vaynberg
- Release date: 1974
- Country: Soviet Union
- Language: Russian

Tsarevich Prosha (Russian: Царевич Проша) is a 1974 Soviet children's fantasy film directed by Nadezhda Kosheverova.

== Plot ==
Tsarevich Prosh lives in one kingdom. Suddenly he had a wonderful dream and Prosh did not want to tell this dream to his father. The tsar did not like this, and he drove Prosh out of the kingdom.

== Cast ==
- Sergey Martynov as Prosha
- Valeriy Zolotukhin as Lutonya
- Tatyana Shestakova as Princess
- Yevgeniy Tilicheev as Derdidas
- Valeri Nosik as Okh
- Aleksandr Benyaminov as Mops
- Tatyana Pelttser as Berta
- Sergey Filippov as Ataman
- Georgiy Vitsin as Katorz IX
