= Two Comrades Were Serving =

- Rolan Bykov and Oleg Yankovsky
- Directed by: Yevgeny Karelov
- Written by: Yuli Dunsky; Valeri Frid
- Starring: Oleg Yankovsky; Rolan Bykov; Anatoli Papanov; Vladimir Vysotsky
- Cinematography: Mikhail Ardabyevsky; Viktor Belokopytov
- Edited by: M. Renkova
- Music by: Yevgeni Ptichkin
- Distributed by: Mosfilm; Creative Union Comrade
- Release date: 1968
- Running time: 93 minutes
- Country: Soviet Union
- Language: Russian

Two Comrades Were Serving (Russian: Служили два товарища, translit. Sluzhili dva tovarishcha) is a 1968 Soviet war film directed by Yevgeny Karelov with a script by Yuli Dunsky and Valeri Frid. The film is about the Russian Civil War, in particular, the battle for the Crimean peninsula.

== Plot ==
In 1920, two soldiers of the Red Army, Andrei Nekrasov and Ivan Karyakin are sent by their regimental commander on a reconnaissance mission in an aircraft to film the White Army fortifications on the way into Crimea (Perekop). The film's focus is the friendship between these two decidedly different characters. Nekrasov is intelligent and war-weary, while Karyakin is simple-minded, yet idealistic and energetic. After filming, the engine on their airplane stalls and they are forced to land in unfriendly territory. They are taken prisoner by Makhnovists but manage to escape and reach a different Red Army unit. They are misidentified as White Army spies and are about to be executed when their colonel appears in time to stop the firing squad. The soldiers play the reel for their commander, but very little had been captured. Karyakin begins to condemn his comrade for supposed crimes, but Nekrasov is able to draw a very accurate map of the fortifications from memory and impresses his commander. Karyakin attempts to reconcile with Nekrasov afterwards but is rebuffed. The two soldiers encounter each other again during the assault on Perekop. Karyakin has become a commander in the meantime. They forget their earlier quarrel and reconcile.

In a parallel plotline, Brusentsov, a cynical and disillusioned White Army officer, accidentally kills a comrade and romances a young lady, Alexandra. He suggests an action that would have prevented a Red Army landing in Crimea but is ignored by his superiors. While fleeing after the defeat of the White Army, he shoots Nekrasov from afar; earlier, Nekrasov had stopped Karyakin from shooting Brusentsov. Karyakin tries in vain to save his friend. He brings Nekrasov's camera and film back to headquarters. He hums Karyakin's favorite song: "The bullet whizzed and aha! My comrade fell," regretting that it was Nekrasov and not himself that was killed. During the evacuation of the White Army from Crimea, Brusentsov has a priest hastily marry him and Sasha. He unsuccessfully attempts to bring his beloved horse with him on the ship. As the ship departs, the horse swims after it, and Brusentsov shoots himself. The film ends with the shots of the Red Army filmed by Nekrasov.

== Cast ==
- Oleg Yankovsky as Andrei Nekrasov
- Rolan Bykov as Ivan Karyakin
- Anatoli Papanov as regiment commander
- Nikolai Kryuchkov as platoon commander
- Alla Demidova as Commissar
- Vladimir Vysotsky as Alexander Brusentsov
- Iya Savvina as Alexandra
- Nikolai Burlyayev as Sergey Lukashevich
- Pyotr Krylov as chief of staff
- Rostislav Yankovsky as Colonel Vasilchikov
- Roman Tkachuk as White Guard officer
- Nikolai Parfyonov as White Guard officer
- Juozas Budraitis as member of Red Staff
- Veniamin Smekhov as Baron Krause

== Production ==
The theme song was included on Lyube's 1995 album, Kombat.
