= The Story of Voyages =

- Soviet film poster
- Directed by: Alexander Mitta
- Written by: Alexander Mitta; Yuli Dunsky; Valeri Frid
- Starring: Andrei Mironov; Tatyana Aksyuta; Lev Durov
- Cinematography: Valeri Shuvalov
- Music by: Alfred Schnittke
- Distributed by: Mosfilm
- Release dates: 1983 (Soviet Union, Czechoslovakia, Romania); 1985 (East Germany, Hungary); 1989 (Japan)
- Running time: 101 minutes
- Countries: Soviet Union, Czechoslovakia, Romania
- Language: Russian

The Story of Voyages, also translated as A Fairy Tale of Wanderings (Russian: Сказка странствий) is a 1983 Soviet Russian fantasy adventure film directed by Alexander Mitta and starring Andrei Mironov. The film is notably darker and more adult-oriented than most of Soviet fantasy movies, which were usually made for children. It was a joint co-production of Russian, Czechoslovak, and Romanian studios.

== Plot ==
In a medieval fantasy kingdom, two orphans, May and his sister Martha, live in poverty. May has a unique ability to sense gold from a distance, but he feels ill whenever he is near gold. May and Martha never used the former's ability to gain riches. One night, during Winter celebrations, a group of robbers kidnap May to exploit his magic ability. Martha sets out on a quest to find her brother. As she tries to pursue the robbers in the cold winter night, she passes out on the snow.

Martha is picked up by travelling scientist, Orlando. Together they wait out the cold night in Orlando's traveling wagon. During the night, wolves ate Orlando's horse and the two are forced to continue traveling on foot. Martha tries to convince Orlando to help her rescue May, but Orlando is not passionate about the quest. Orlando has dozens of scientific ideas that he wants to turn into reality and he believes that traveling with Martha sets him back. He reluctantly agrees to go with Martha. Together, the two wander through various fantastic countries.

They first travel across a swamp to a mountain where a dragon sleeps. That place was believed to be dangerous because not a single knight who went there has returned. Orlando is cautious at first due to the danger, but he agrees to go on Martha's behalf. Once they reach the mountain, they discover a paradise village built on the dragon's back. Apparently, every single knight was alive and they stayed in the village because it was a paradise. In the village it is warm, there is plenty of food available, and nobody has to work. The knights were lazing around all day long and they did not want to share the secret paradise with anyone else. Orlando is tempted into staying at the village and that causes a dispute between him and Martha. Soon, Martha discovers the robbers and her brother near the village. Before she and Orlando can rescue May, the dragon wakes up and destroys the entire paradise village. Martha and Orlando survive the destruction, but they are once again separated from the robbers and May.

Martha and Orlando continue their journey while still quarreling over their dispute. They reach another city and they stop at a tavern for food. Orlando dances with a local woman and that gets him drawn into an argument because he is an outsider. The argument ends with Orlando being restrained and beaten by several local men. Orlando retaliates by fighting back and a brawl ensues. Martha and Orlando escape from the tavern, but outside they are caught and arrested by the city's guards. Orlando is put to a trial by an inquisition and during the trial Orlando delivers a passionate speech about his scientific discoveries and philosophies. Regardless, Orlando is founded guilty by the inquisition and he is sentenced to execution by being immuremented in a tower.

Orlando remains magnanimous as he is being sealed inside of the tower. But, Martha does not want to leave Orlando behind and she jumps into the tower shortly before it is sealed. Orlando reprimands Martha for her reckless action as they both are doomed to face a slow agonizing death. Orlando loses his spirit and he hopelessly lays in the dark. Meanwhile, Martha remains optimistic because she believes that Orlando can think of something.

Meanwhile, Martha's brother May is being carried around by the robbers. At first, May is subjected to exploitation and abuse, especially after his abilities fail to find a sufficient amount of gold. However, as time passes, the robber leader Gorgon starts to develop a caring and a protective personality towards May. Eventually, the robbers discover a chest full of gold using May's ability. The robbers continue their quest of finding more gold.

Martha and Orlando find a way to the top of the tower, but there is no possibility of escape. Just as Orlando suggests they jump off to end their misery, he gets an inspiration to build a flying apparatus. He first draws a sketch of the apparatus before building it. In a climatic moment, Martha and Orlando leap off the tower and they fly away from captivity.

They crash-land in a city ravaged by the Black Death, which is personified as a witch in black. After exploring the gloomy city, the two travelers make camp in the forest. They are approached by two orphaned children and Martha takes care of them. As they sit around a campfire, Martha confesses to Orlando that she loves him. In response, Orlando admits that his life would have been much more mundane had he not met Martha. Just as they dream of the future, they are approached by the Black Death Witch who wants to claim their lives. Orlando uses a torch from the campfire to fend off against the Witch. He succeeds in defeating the Witch by setting her on fire, but he gets infected by the plague and he dies soon after. His body is cremated by Plague doctors. With the Witch defeated, the city is saved from the plague. As the locals celebrate, Martha helps the two orphans to reunite with their grandmother before continuing to search for her brother.

Ten years later, Martha reaches a land where a cruel prince was reigning. After being chased by the prince's hunting party, Martha realizes that the prince is her brother May. In the past ten years, May stopped feeling ill when he was near gold and he managed to develop an ability of attracting gold to himself using telekinetic powers. May's ability made Gorgon rich, but Gorgon admitted that gold no longer brought him joy. Instead, Gorgon found joy by raising May as his own son and making him his heir.

After a reunion celebration, Gorgon understood that Martha is a threat to his ambitions. He tries to convince Martha to leave by offering her gold. But, when she refuses Gorgon incarcerated her in a tower. Gorgon and Brutus, conspire a plan to kill Martha by sabotaging a staged escape plan. Before that takes place, May discovers that his sister is incarcerated. He sees that she is suffering and he becomes disappointed with himself and with Gorgon. In a rage of self-hatred, May attracts all of the gold in the castle to himself. By doing so, he destroys the castle and kills all of the robbers.

Martha and May emerge from the castle's ruins. May discovers that he lost his gold-sensing ability. Martha is disappointed and she expresses regret for finding her brother. However, she soon realizes that the spirit of Orlando has been reborn in May once he makes a remark about 'flying home.' Martha encourages May to draw a flying apparatus. Even though May never knew how to draw, he walks up to a wall and he starts sketching a flying apparatus that looks similar to the one that Orlando once drew.

== Cast ==
- Andrei Mironov — Orlando, the travelling scientist
- Tatyana Aksyuta — Martha (voiced by Marina Neyolova)
- Lev Durov — Gorgon, the robber
- Baltybay Seytmamutov — Brutus, the robber
- Ksenia Piratinskaya — May as a child
- Valery Storozhik — May as an adult
- Karmen Galin — the Plague Witch (voiced by Yekaterina Vasilyeva)
- Veniamin Smekhov — Don Qixote
- Vladimir Basov — the lawyer
- Alexander Pyatkov — the driller
- Jean Lorin Florescu — the prosecutor (voiced by Viktor Sergachyov)

== Reception ==
The Story of Voyages is in the List of 100 most important Science Fiction and Fantasy films by Mir Fantastiki magazine.
