= How Robinson Was Created =

- Directed by: Eldar Ryazanov
- Written by: Eldar Ryazanov
- Starring: Anatoli Papanov; Sergey Filippov
- Cinematography: Leonid Kraynenkov
- Music by: Anatoly Lepin
- Production company: Mosfilm
- Release date: 1961
- Running time: 15 minutes
- Country: USSR
- Language: Russian

How Robinson Was Created (Russian: Как создавался Робинзон, translit. Kak sozdavalsya Robinzon) is a 1961 short Soviet film directed and written by Eldar Ryazanov. The film is part of the comedy anthology film series Absolutely Seriously (Russian: Совершенно серьезно, romanized: Sovershenno seryozno). It is based on the 1933 satirical short story "How the Soviet Robinson was Created" by Ilf and Petrov.

== Plot ==
Chief editor of the "Adventure Business" magazine decides to commission a novel from the famous writer Moldavantsev which is to be a continuation of Daniel Defoe's famous literary creation Robinson Crusoe. The writer initially takes on his task with great enthusiasm and soon the editor gets to read Moldavantsev's manuscript. Despite the fact that the writer tried to create a "soviet" Robinson, the editor remains deeply unsatisfied. He pressures Moldavantsev to make major adjustments to his work. Union members, a contribution collecting secretary of the local committee, and even a safe - all this, according to the editor must show up, along with Robinson at the supposedly deserted island! The apotheosis of editorial changes becomes the proposal to exclude the character of Robinson from the novel.

== Cast ==
- Anatoli Papanov - Editor of magazine "Adventure business"
- Sergey Filippov - Moldavantsev, writer / presenter of film almanac
- Pavel Tarasov - film critic in the Prologue (uncredited)
- George Kulikov - screenwriter in the Prologue (uncredited)
- Petr Repnin - film critic in the Prologue (uncredited)
