= My Father Is an Idealist =

- Russian: Мой папа — идеалист
- Directed by: Vladimir Bortko
- Written by: Alla Sokolova
- Starring: Vladislav Strzhelchik; Yuriy Bogatyryov; Natalya Varley; Irina Skobtseva; Ivan Dmitriev
- Cinematography: Eduard Rozovsky
- Music by: Viktor Lebedev
- Release date: 1980
- Running time: 88 minute
- Country: Soviet Union
- Language: Russian

My Father Is an Idealist (Russian: Мой папа — идеалист) is a 1980 Soviet romance film directed by Vladimir Bortko.

== Plot ==
The film is about a resuscitator who cannot get along with his father, but everything changes when a young stepmother is in danger during childbirth.

== Cast ==
- Vladislav Strzhelchik
- Yuriy Bogatyryov
- Natalya Varley
- Irina Skobtseva
- Ivan Dmitriev
- Igor Dmitriev
- Aleksandr Belinsky
- Vladimir Retsepter
- Boris Sokolov
- Vsevolod Gavrilov
