= Eduard Rozovsky =

Soviet cinematographer and cameraman

Eduard Aleksanrovich Rozovsky (Russian: Эдуард Александрович Розовский; 14 December 1926 – 26 July 2011) was a Soviet cinematographer and cameraman, whose film credits include Amphibian Man and White Sun of the Desert.

Rozovsky was an alumna of Russian State Institute of Cinematography (VGIK), which is now called the Gerasimov Institute of Cinematography. His father was Alexander Evseevich Rozovsky, and his mother was Nonna (Anna) Naumovna (née Poliak).He began his career at the Lennauchfilm film studio, where he started as a cameraman. He then joined Lenfilm studio, where he worked as a cinematographer.

Rozovsky is credited as the cinematographer on more than eighty films, spanning several decades. His best known films include White Sun of the Desert, Amphibian Man, The Seventh Companion, Kain XVIII, and Chief of Chukotka. He later became the film department chairman at the St. Petersburg State University of Cinema and Television. He was named People's Artist of Russia in 1997 for his work.

Rozovsky died in a car accident when he lost control of his Opel Astra while driving on the highway from the city of St. Petersburg to his country home in Priozersk. It is unknown if he died from the car accident or his heart stopping. He was 84 years old.

== Selected Cinematography ==
Film name	Year
Iriston's Son	1959
Amphibian Man	1961
Cain XVIII	1963
Friends and Years	1965
Chief of Chukotka	1966
The Seventh Companion	1967
White Sun of the Desert	1969
Tsarevich Prosha	1974
How Ivanushka the Fool Travelled in Search of Wonder	1977
Wrong Connection	1977
My Father Is an Idealist	1980
The Donkey's Hide	1982
Highway	1982
And Then Came Bumbo...	1984
The Tale about the Painter in Love	1987
White Nights	1992
