= Honeymoon (1956 film) =

- Russian: Медовый месяц
- Directed by: Nadezhda Kosheverova
- Written by: Klimenti Mints; Evgeniy Pomeshchikov
- Starring: Lyudmila Kasatkina; Pavel Kadochnikov
- Cinematography: Anatoli Nazarov
- Music by: Moisey Vaynberg
- Production company: Lenfilm
- Release date: 1956
- Running time: 93 min.
- Country: Soviet Union
- Language: Russian

Honeymoon (Russian: Медовый месяц, romanized: Medovyy mesyats) is a 1956 Soviet romantic comedy film directed by Nadezhda Kosheverova.

== Plot ==
Lyuda Odintsova, a graduate of the medical institute, called for engineer Aleksei Rybalchenko to stay in Leningrad after distribution. But unexpectedly, Aleksei agreed to work in Siberia, and poor Lyudochka had to follow her husband to a Siberian construction site and begin her working career as a doctor in a tiny medical center of a working village.

== Cast ==
- Lyudmila Kasatkina as Lyuda Odintsova
- Pavel Kadochnikov as Aleksei Rybalchenko
- Tatyana Pankova as Anna Terentyevna
- Pavel Sukhanov as Ivan Terentevich
- Zoya Fyodorova as Elizaveta Povariha
- Sergey Filippov as ferryman
- Ekaterina Savinova as Zoya
- Anatoli Abramov
- Valentin Abramov
- Kirill Lavrov

== Release ==
Nadezhda Kosheverova's film was watched by 26.5 million Soviet viewers, which is the 458 result in the entire history of the Soviet film distribution.
