= Yulian Panich =

Russian actor (1931–2023)

Panich in 2013

Yulian Aleksandrovich Panich (Russian: Юлиа́н Алекса́ндрович Па́нич; 23 May 1931 – 9 October 2023) was a Soviet and Russian actor, director, and journalist. He was appointed Honored Artist of Russia in 1996.

== Biography ==
Yulian Aleksandrovich Panich was born in Kirivigrad/Zinovyevsk on 23 May 1931. After graduating from the Shchukin Acting School in Moscow in 1954, Panich had a successful career of a Soviet film actor. In 1965 he began working as a television and film director.

In 1972, Yulian Panich left the Soviet Union for Israel. Later that year he was offered a job in Munich with the Radio Liberty/Free Europe radio. Soon Panich became chief program producer with the Russian service (Radio Svoboda) and the symbol of anti-Soviet resistance. As such he was the object of special interest by the KGB.

== Personal life and death ==
After his retirement in 1995, Panich lived in the suburbs of Rambouillet in Paris.

Panich was married to Ludmila Zweig from 1956. They had a son, Igor Panich (born 1958) who is a writer.

Yulian Panich died on 9 October 2023, at the age of 92.

== Filmography ==
- Road to Life (1955) as Semyon
- For the Power of the Soviets (1956) as Svyatoslav Marchenko
- Bloody Dawn (1956) as Marco Hushcha
- Different Fortunes (1956) as Fedor Morozov
- Three Hundred Years Ago... (1956) as Tymofiy Khmelnytsky
- Total Expensive (1957) as Roman Baklanov
- Leningrad Symphony (1957) as episode
- Stepan Kolchugin (1958) as Kuzma
- Kochubey (1958) as Sashko Nalivayko
- About My Friend (1958) as Aram
- Be Careful, Grandma! (1960) as Vasya Kazatchkov
- Reflections (1960) as episode
- Novels Red House (1963) as Maxim Sivoshapko
- The Green Carriage (1967) as Prince Vasili
- Pervorossiyane (1968) as Ataman Shurakov
- Seeing the White Nights (1969) as director
