= An Old, Old Tale =

- Directed by: Nadezhda Kosheverova
- Written by: Yuli Dunsky; Valeri Frid
- Starring: Oleg Dahl; Marina Neyolova; Vladimir Etush
- Cinematography: Konstantin Ryzhov
- Music by: Andrey Petrov
- Production company: Lenfilm
- Release date: 1968
- Running time: 92 minutes
- Country: Soviet Union
- Language: Russian

An Old, Old Tale (Russian: Старая, старая сказка, romanized: Staraya, staraya skazka) is a 1968 Soviet children's fantasy film directed by Nadezhda Kosheverova. It is based on four fairy tales by Hans Christian Andersen: "The Tinderbox", "The Travelling Companion", "The Swineherd" and "Blockhead Hans".

== Plot ==
=== Prologue ===
A poor wandering puppeteer gives a performance in a roadside inn to pay for a pint of beer and dinner. The audience applauds, and the happy owner asks his daughter to lavishly wine and dine the actor. The puppeteer and the daughter of the innkeeper become so in love with each other that they plan to run away together at dawn. At night, the dolls come to life. They are very upset by the future parting and ask their owner not to leave them. The latter wants to start a family and acquire a more profound profession. Knowing that he can not fall asleep until morning, the puppeteer asks the puppets to play a fairy tale for him, like a performance, which they do.

=== Performance ===
Under a cheerful song-march, a soldier walks along the road and meets a witch. She suggests that he go down into the magic well and collect as many gold coins as he can carry, and then share the wealth with her in half. The soldier descends into the well and fills the bucket with money, but the "devil's grandma", after pulling out the money refuses to retrieve the soldier from the well. He climbs out by himself and chops off the witch's head for treachery. Having put a cabbage head on instead of her human head, the witch runs away.

Having defeated the witch, the soldier thereby breaks a spell which caused a good wizard to turn into a black cat. In gratitude for salvation, the wizard gives the soldier a wondrous flint and promises his help at any time - it is enough to just hit the flint. For the time being the soldier forgets about the flint. Before him lies the path to the kingdom, where he immediately encounters a huge queue of princes - in a small state a princess is being given away for marriage despite her wishes.

The soldier falls in love with the princess, who gives riddles to her numerous fiancés, and comes to her to woo. But she drives the hapless lover away, as her father, the king, very much wants to see the soldier as her husband because he thinks that he has a lot of gold. Wishing to smoke, the soldier gathers a light and gets a spark from the flint, which causes the wizard to appear who is ready to fulfill any of his wishes. The servant asks for a miracle - to bring the princess to him. Reluctantly the sorcerer agrees.

The young couple is walking on the roofs and are chatting cordially, the girl thinks that all this is a dream. After an attempt to kiss her, the heir to the throne understands that everything is happening for real, and returns home. In the morning she promises the king to marry someone who can solve a logical problem. No one is able to guess the riddles. The soldier summons a wizard who gives him a clue, but after a seemingly successful exam, the king still orders the execution of the serviceman.

At the trial the soldier asks to fulfill his last wish - to smoke, and using the flint summons the same magician who frees the hero. The frightened princess agrees to marry him. The young man is promoted to general and is given a new uniform, but he intends to leave the inhospitable kingdom because the girl does not love him.

At parting, he kisses the princess and leaves her in tears. Again, he leaves somewhere, but the girl catches up with the soldier. It turns out that she was bewitched and that was why she was so evil and capricious. With his kiss, he broke the enchantment and the princess wants to be with him. This concludes the performance.

=== Epilogue ===
In the morning the daughter of the innkeeper informs the puppeteer about her decision to stay - she can not leave her father and her home. Then he leaves with his dolls for good.

== Cast ==
- Oleg Dahl as soldier / puppeteer
- Marina Neyolova as princess / daughter of innkeeper
- Vladimir Etush as the king / innkeeper
- Georgy Vitsin as kind magician
- Vera Titova as witch
- Victor Perevalov as Prince-chimney sweeper
- Igor Dmitriev as oriental prince
- Georgy Shtil as bodyguard of the princess
- Boris Leskin as coachman
- Anatoly Korolkevich as doorman
- Georgiy Gheorghiu as Fatty
- Lev Lemke as Thin
- Anatoly Abramov as the first suitor
