= Afrikanych =

1970 film

- Russian: Африканыч
- Directed by: Mikhail Yershov
- Written by: Vasili Belov; Viktor Sokolov; Arnold Vitol
- Starring: Oleg Belov; Irina Bunina; Larisa Burkova; German Orlov; Nikolay Trofimov
- Cinematography: Anatoli Nazarov
- Music by: Venyamin Basner
- Release date: 1970
- Running time: 60 minute
- Country: Soviet Union
- Language: Russian

Afrikanych (Russian: Африканыч) is a 1970 Soviet romantic comedy film directed by Mikhail Yershov.

== Plot ==
The film tells about a man who lived all his life in the village with his wife Katerina, who gave birth to six children and became ill. He sets off to look for work, but along the way he began to realize that he could not live without his family.

== Cast ==
- Oleg Belov
- Irina Bunina as Katerina
- Larisa Burkova
- German Orlov as Mitka
- Nikolay Trofimov as Ivan Afrikanych
