= Cinderella (1947 film) =

1947 Soviet Union film

Cinderella Золушка
- Directed by: Nadezhda Kosheverova; Mikhail Shapiro
- Written by: Evgeny Schwartz
- Based on: Cinderella by Charles Perrault
- Starring: Yanina Zhejmo; Aleksey Konsovsky; Erast Garin; Faina Ranevskaya
- Production company: Lenfilm
- Release date: May 16, 1947
- Running time: 84 minutes
- Country: Soviet Union
- Language: Russian

Cinderella (Russian: Зо́лушка, romanized: Zolushka) is a 1947 Soviet fairy tale musical film by Lenfilm studios.

== Plot ==
The story unfolds in a magical kingdom as its inhabitants prepare for a grand royal ball. The King (Erast Garin) checks the readiness of all palace services in the morning and meets the Forester (Vasili Merkuryev) during an inspection run. During their conversation, it turns out that the Forester and his daughter Cinderella (Yanina Zhejmo) suffer from the despotism of Stepmother (Faina Ranevskaya), who dotes on her two native daughters Anna and Marianne (Elena Yunger, Tamara Sezenevskaya), but at the same time suppresses her husband and stepdaughter. The King invites the Forester to the ball with Cinderella, assuring that in the evening there will be "a celebration that will make you forget all the hardships."

Meanwhile, Cinderella, doing household chores, talks about how her Stepmother and stepsisters will dance and eat ice cream at the ball, and she will be able, at best, to stand under the palace windows and look at the celebration from afar. The heroine's appeal to "kind people" who would help change her life turns out to be heard: in the evening twilight, Fairy Godmother (Varvara Myasnikova) appears in front of the girl; Fairy is accompanied by a young Page (Igor Klimenkov). The Fairy Godmother uses a magic wand to turn a pumpkin into a carriage, mice into four horses, and a rat into a Coachman. Instead of the poor "dirty girl" dress, the heroine turns out to be dressed in a ball gown. The page presents her with crystal slippers. Escorting the heroine to the ball, the Fairy Godmother urges her to return home no later than twelve o'clock, because at midnight Cinderella's beautiful dress will turn into an old one, and the horses will turn into mice again.

The King, who meets Cinderella on the steps of the palace, sincerely rejoices at the new guest, and the Prince (Aleksey Konsovsky) falls in love with a "mysterious and beautiful stranger" at first sight. While the Stepmother, Anna and Marianne consider the "signs of attention" from the illustrious persons, Cinderella, who is not recognized by them, plunges into the atmosphere of the holiday. Suddenly, the Page appears in front of her, who warns her that the King has ordered all the palace clocks to be turned back an hour. Cinderella manages to thank the Prince for his kindness and care and rushes down the marble steps.

The miniature crystal slipper that slipped off the heroine's foot is the only thing the Prince has left. The king, organizing a search for a stranger, announces that the girl who will fit the shoe will become the Prince's bride. When the royal Corporal (Sergey Filippov), who is trying on, appears at the Forester's house, Cinderella puts a shoe on Anna's foot at her Stepmother's request. The king, however, refuses to recognize Anna as his son's bride. Meanwhile, the Forester brings the reluctant Cinderella to the palace and, during a conversation with the King, takes the second shoe out of his pocket. The film ends with Cinderella and the Prince explaining and the King predicting that they "will have a daughter, just like Cinderella," who will be married by the Page.

== Cast ==
- Yanina Zhejmo as Cinderella
- Aleksey Konsovsky as Prince
- Erast Garin as King
- Vasili Merkuryev as Forester, Cinderella's father
- Faina Ranevskaya as Cinderella's stepmother
- Elena Yunger as Anna, Cinderella's stepsister
- Tamara Sezenevskaya Marianne, Cinderella's stepsister
- Aleksander Rumnyov as Marquis of Pas de Troyes, Royal Ballet Master
- Varvara Myasnikova as Fairy
- Igor Klemenkov as Page, Fairy's assistant
- Sergey Filippov as Corporal
- Konstantin Adashevsky as Herold (uncredited)
- Alexander Violinov as The Old Footman (uncredited)
- Nikolai Michurin as The Good Magician (uncredited)
- Mikhail Rostovtsev as Minister ("The Good Bug") (uncredited)
- Boris Kudryashov as the rat turned to coachman (uncredited)
- Valentin Kiselyov, Anatoly Korolkevich as gatekeepers (uncredited)
- Lev Stepanov as Conductor of the Royal Orchestra (uncredited)
- Kirill Gun as courtier (uncredited)
- A. I. Del as old minister at the ball (uncredited)
- Nina Kozlovskaya, Tatyana Piletskaya as dancers at the ball (uncredited)
- Yakov Butovsky as footman at the ball (uncredited)

== Literature ==
- Bagrov, P. “Cinderella: Residents of a Fairy Kingdom”. Moscow: Kрупный план, 2011. ISBN 978-5-9903173-1-4.
- Binevich, E. M. “Yevgeny Schwartz: Chronicles of a Life”. St. Petersburg, 2008. ISBN 978-5-901562-80-2.
- “Soviet Feature Films: Annotated Catalog. Volume 2: Sound Films (1930–1957)”. Edited by A. V. Macheret et al. Moscow: Искусство, 1961.
- Gorelova, V. “Cinderella”, in *Russian Illusion*. Edited by L. A. Parfyonov. Moscow: Materik, 2003. ISBN 5-85646-100-2.
- “Chronicle of Russian Cinema 1946–1965: A Scientific Monograph”. Edited by A. S. Deryabin. Moscow: Kanon+, 2010. ISBN 9785883731524.
- Zheymo, Y. “The Long Journey from a Circus Drummer to Cinderella in Film”. Moscow: Alpina Non-Fiction, 2020. ISBN 978-5-00139-191-3.
- Losyev, L. F., ed. “About Ranevskaya”. Moscow: Искусство, 1988.
- Razlogov, K. E., et al., eds. “The First Century of Our Cinema: Encyclopedia”. Moscow: Lokid-Press, 2006. ISBN 5-98601-027-2.
- Roshal, L., ed. “Cinema of Russia: Director's Encyclopedia, Volume 1”. Moscow: NII Kinoiskusstva, 2010. ISBN 978-5-91524-015-4.
- Skorokhodov, G. A. “Faina Ranevskaya: The Great Foofer, or Living with Humor”. Moscow: Algoritm, 2016. ISBN 978-5-906861-05-4.
- Smolin, I., ed. “Three Great Old Women”. Moscow: Melikhovo, 2017. ISBN 978-5-906339-07-2.
- Titova, A. N., ed. “Living Well is Good! Living Better is Even Better! Aphorisms from Films”. Moscow: Centrpoligraph, 2010. ISBN 978-5-9524-4926-8.
- Schwartz, Y. L. “Living Restlessly...From Diaries”. Moscow: Soviet Writer, 1990. ISBN 5-265-00656-7.
- Khort, A. N. “Meyerhold's Jokesters”. Moscow: Молодая Гвардия, 2018. ISBN 978-5-235-04151-6.
- Khrzhanovsky, A. Y., ed. “The Sorcerer's Apprentice: A Book about Erast Garin”. Moscow: Искусство, 2004. ISBN 5-85200-415-4.
