= Commandant of the Bird Island =

1939 film directed by Vasili Pronin

- Russian: Комендант Птичьего острова
- Directed by: Vasily Pronin
- Written by: Sergei Dikovsky
- Starring: Leonid Kmit; Aleksey Konsovsky
- Music by: Vano Muradeli
- Release date: 1939
- Running time: 55 min.
- Country: Soviet Union
- Language: Russian

Commandant of the Bird Island (Russian: Комендант Птичьего острова) is a 1939 Soviet drama film directed by Vasili Pronin.

== Plot ==
The border patrol boat Smely intercepts a schooner off the coast of Kamchatka. Onboard, posing as fishermen, are Japanese spies. The vessel is taken in tow, and sailor Kositsyn is left aboard to keep watch. A violent storm breaks out, and the spies cut the towlines. The schooner crashes onto coastal rocks, stranding everyone on a deserted islet. Now Kositsyn faces an almost impossible task: alone, without sleep, food, or water, he must guard seven Japanese spies and prevent their escape. With no hope of rescue, he nevertheless fulfills his duty as a Soviet border guard.

== Cast ==
- Leonid Kmit as Kositsyn
- Nikolai Dorokhin as Commander of the Soviet border patrol boat 'Smely'
- Nikolay Gorlov as Ensign
- Mikhail Troyanovsky as Captain of a Japanese schooner
- Lev Potyomkin as Skipper of a Japanese schooner
- Aleksey Konsovsky as Japanese radio operator
- Pyotr Savin as Red Navy sailor
- Aleksandr Grechany as Red Navy sailor
