= Doctor Aybolit (film) =

- Russian: Доктор Айболит
- Directed by: Vladimir Nemolyayev
- Written by: Korney Chukovsky; Evgeniy Shvarts
- Produced by: O. Kolodny
- Starring: Maksim Shtraukh; Anna Semionovna; Igor Arkadin; Yevgeni Gurov; Aleksandr Timontayev
- Cinematography: A. Petrov
- Edited by: L. Juchkova
- Music by: Aleksandr Varlamov
- Release date: 14 March 1938
- Running time: 72 minutes
- Country: Soviet Union
- Language: Russian

Doctor Aybolit (Russian: Доктор Айболит) is a 1938 Soviet live-action family film directed by Vladimir Nemolyayev.

== Plot ==
The film is based on the eponymous book by Korney Chukovsky. Aibolit meets a little boy and decides to help him.

== Cast ==
- Maksim Shtraukh as Dr. Aibolit
- Anna Semionovna as Varvara (as A. Vilyams)
- Igor Arkadin as Benalis
- Yevgeni Gurov
- Aleksandr Timontayev as Robber
- Iona Biy-Brodskiy as Robber (as I. Bii-Brodsky)
- Pyotr Galadzhev as Robber (as P. Galadjev)
- Emmanuil Geller as Robber
- Viktor Seleznyov
