= Aleksey Konsovsky =

Soviet actor (1912–1991)

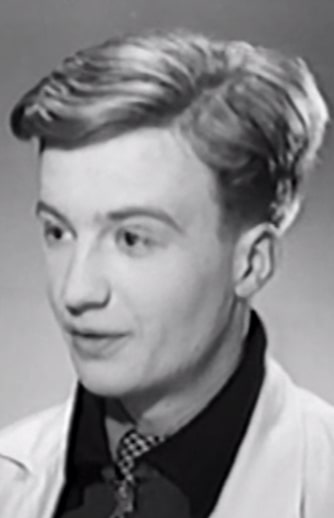
- Born: Aleksey Anatolyevich Konsovsky; 28 January 1912; Moscow, Russian Empire
- Died: 20 July 1991 (aged 79); Moscow, Soviet Union
- Occupation: Actor
- Years active: 1936—1991
- Spouse: Vera Altayskaya

Aleksey Anatolyevich Konsovsky (Russian: Алексей Анатольевич Консовский; 28 January 1912 – 20 July 1991) was a Soviet and Russian film, stage and voice actor. People's Artist of the RSFSR (1976).

== Biography ==
Konsovsky was born in Moscow to a working class family.

He was married to Vera Altayskaya, an actress with whom they appeared together in most of the movies.

He died in Moscow and was buried in the Vagankovo Cemetery.

== Awards and honors ==
- Order of the Badge of Honour (1949)
- Honored Artist of the RSFSR (1964)
- Vasilyev Brothers State Prize of the RSFSR (1966)
- People's Artist of the RSFSR (1976)

== Filmography ==
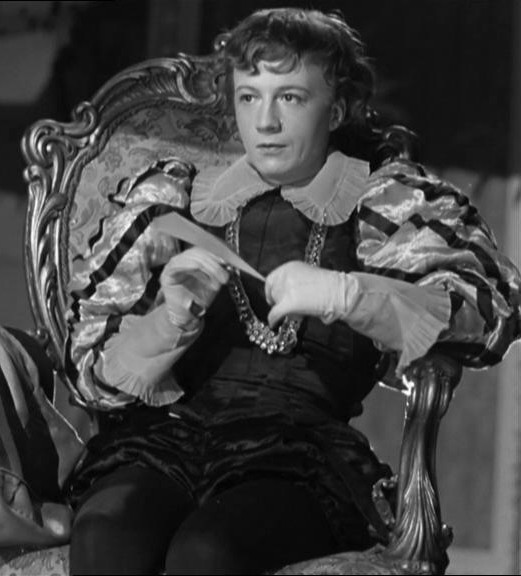
Aleksey Konsovsky as Prince in Cinderella (1947)

Year	Title	Role	Notes
1936	The Last Night	Kuzma Zakharkin	
1938	Peat-Bog Soldiers	Franz Müller	
1939	The Oppenheim Family	Richard	
1939	Commandant of the Bird Island	Japanese radio operator	
1939	Member of the Government	Petka, teen groom	
1942	Mashenka	Muryaga, young taxi driver	Uncredited
1943	We from the Urals	Kuzya Zavarin	
1947	Alisher Navoi	Alisher Navoi's voice	Role played by Razzoq Hamroyev
1947	Cinderella	Prince	
1947	The Village Teacher	Kolya Sharygin	
1948	Michurin	Pashkevich's guest	
1951	Taras Shevchenko	Vladimir Kurochkin	
1952	The Scarlet Flower	The Monster/The Prince	Voice
1955	The Enchanted Boy	Ermenrich the Stork and one of the geese	Voice
1955	Mikhaylo Lomonosov	Grigory Teplov	
1957	The Snow Queen	Reindeer	Voice
1958	Fathers and Sons	Nikolai Petrovich Kirsanov	
1959	Iriston's Son	Alexander Opekushin	
1960	Resurrection	Narrator's voice	
1964	An Ordinary Miracle	Wizard	
1966	I Remember Everything, Richard	Jānis Kalniņš' voice	Role played by Harijs Liepiņš
1969	Flying Phantom Ship	Captain Phantom	Soviet dub
1969	The Red Tent	Umberto Nobile's voice	Role played by Peter Finch
1973	The Headless Horseman	Cassius Calhoun's voice	Role played by Aarne Üksküla
1973	Old Walls	Pavlik's voice	Role played by Yevgeny Kindinov
1975	The Adventures of Buratino	Talking Cricket	Voice
1976	Circus in the Circus	Professor Růžička's voice	Role played by Jiří Sovák
1976	The Steadfast Tin Soldier	Narrator's voice	
1978	Where Were You, Odysseus?	Soviet spy Odyssey's voice	Role played by Donatas Banionis
1990	Stalin's Funeral	Doctors' plot arrestee	Final role
