= Leonid Kmit =

Soviet and Russian actor (1908–1982)

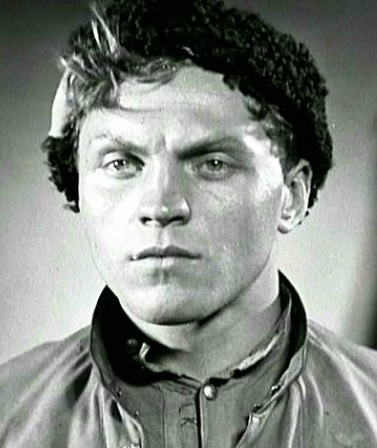
Leonid Kmit

Leonid Aleksandrovich Kmit (born Aleksei Aleksandrovich Kmita; Russian: Алексей Александрович Кмита́; 9 March 1908 – 11 March 1982) was a Soviet and Russian actor. In 1931 he graduated from Saint Petersburg State Theatre Arts Academy (SPbGATI), where he studied in the acting class of Yevgeny Chervyakov. In 1936 he was invited to join the Russian Army Theatre's company. In 1957 he became an actor of the Screen Actors Theater in Moscow.

Kmit performed in more than thirty films from 1929 to 1982. He is best known for his performance as Petka in Chapaev.

== Selected filmography ==
Film
Year	Title	Role	Notes
1980	Star Inspector	reporter	
1964	Come Here, Mukhtar!	Stepan	
1960	Michman Panin	Savichev, non-commissioned officer	
1953	Hostile Whirlwinds	policeman	
1951	Taras Shevchenko	Captain Obriadin	
1950	Brave People	handicapper	
1939	Commandant of the Bird Island	sailor Kositsyn	
1934	Chapaev	Petka	
1934	Lieutenant Kijé	copyist	
