= Seven Nannies =

- Directed by: Rolan Bykov
- Written by: Valeri Frid; Yuli Dunsky
- Starring: Semyon Morozov; Valentin Burovl; Vladimir Ivashov
- Cinematography: Pyotr Satunovsky
- Music by: Karen Khachaturian
- Production company: Mosfilm
- Release date: 1962
- Running time: 76 minutes
- Country: Soviet Union
- Language: Russian

Seven Nannies (Russian: Семь нянек, romanized: Sem nyanek) is a 1962 Soviet comedy film, directorial debut of Rolan Bykov.

== Plot ==
At one of the watch factories works the youth team, nicknamed as the "golden" because of how they perform in everything — both in work and in public life. But the guys wish to accomplish some other feat — they decide to re-educate a difficult teenager Afanasy Polosukhin (Semyon Morozov) from a colony for juvenile offenders.

He is taken straight from the prison colony and enthusiastically re-educated, but Afanasy does not even think about changing his ways. When the comfortable new life begins he finds it all too easy to deceive his mentors. However, the secret still becomes apparent. When Afanasy truly decides to change, he finds it to be too late — the desperate young men decide to admit their obvious moral defeat and to return the guy back to the colony to serve a further severe punishment prescribed by the court.

== Cast ==
- Semyon Morozov — Afanasy Polosukhin
- Valentin Burov — Pavel
- Vladimir Ivashov — Victor
- Mikaela Drozdovskaya — Maya
- Tatyana Nadezhdina — Lena
- Natalia Batyreva — Ira
- Viktor Khokhryakov — the head of the colony
- Valentin Zubkov — Grigory Ivanovich Voloshin, party organizer of the workshop
- Alexey Bakhar — Gordeev, the shop manager
- Vera Mayorova — Alla (alias "Sonya—Golden Handle", alias "Lyubka — Bone Foot")
- Alexey Gribov — Lena's grandfather
- Maria Kravchunovskaya — Lena's grandmother
- Vladimir Rautbart — conductor
- Zinovy Gerdt — Shamsky, father of Maya
- Vera Orlova — Shamskaya, mother of Maya
- Alexey Polevoy — the buyer
- Emmanuel Geller — hire administrator
- Elena Maksimova — controller
- Rina Zelyonaya — woman in red
- Boris Vladimirov — seller in a pet store
- Pavel Vinnik — administrator (uncredited)
- Nikolay Khryaschikov — member of the jury (uncredited)
- Maria Sapozhnikova — old lady in the doorway (uncredited)
- Claudia Khabarova — barmaid (not in the credits)
- Arkady Tsinman — episode
- Konstantin Bartashevich — director of the plant (uncredited)
- Leonid Pirogov — head waiter San Sanych (uncredited)
