= There Was an Old Couple =

1965 film

There Was an Old Couple (Жили-были старик со старухой)
- Romanian Film poster
- Directed by: Grigory Chukhray
- Written by: Yuli Dunsky; Valeri Frid
- Starring: Ivan Marin; Vera Kuznetsova; Lyudmila Maksakova; Georgy Martyniuk; Galina Polskikh
- Cinematography: Sergei Poluyanov
- Music by: Aleksandra Pakhmutova
- Release date: 1965
- Running time: 103 minutes
- Country: Soviet Union
- Language: Russian

There Was an Old Couple (Russian: Жили-были старик со старухой, romanized: Zhili-byli starik so starukhoy) is a 1965 Soviet drama film directed by Grigory Chukhray. It was entered into the 1965 Cannes Film Festival.

== Plot ==
In a small village by a river, two elderly retirees find themselves homeless after their house burns down. Lacking the strength or will to rebuild their wooden cabin, they decide to move to Vorkuta, a northern Siberian town where their daughter lives, despite their son being in a more stable situation. Upon arrival, they learn that their daughter, a mother to a young boy, has left her husband to pursue a relationship with another man. When she returns, her father, deeply offended by her actions, drives her away.

Left behind with their alcoholic son-in-law and grandson, the couple attempts to adapt to their new living situation. The grandfather, who is deeply rooted in the Stalinist ideology of his youth, begins to confront the harsh realities and lasting consequences of that era in the remote Siberian town.

== Cast ==
- Ivan Marin as Grigory Ivanovich Gusakov, the old man
- Vera Kuznetsova as Natalya Maksimovna Gusakova, the old woman
- Georgy Martyniuk as Valentin, Gusakovs' son-in-law
- Lyudmila Maksakova as Nina, Gusakovs' daughter
- Galina Polskikh as Galya, Valentin's neighbor
- Anatoly Yabbarov as Volodya, sectarian
- Viktor Kolpakov as paramedic
- Nikolai Kryuchkov as Anatoly, state farm director
- Giuli Chokhonelidze as engineer
- Nikolai Sergeyev as Nikolai, accountant
