= Yuli Dunsky =

Soviet screenwriter (1922–1982)

- Born: Yuli Teodorovich Dunsky; 22 July 1922; Moscow, Russian SFSR
- Died: 23 March 1982 (aged 59); Moscow, Soviet Union
- Years active: 1957–1982

Yuli Teodorovich Dunsky (Russian: Юлий Теодорович Дунский, 22 July 1922 in Moscow, Russia – 23 March 1982 in Moscow, Soviet Union) was a Soviet screenwriter.

== Biography ==
Dunsky was born in Moscow. In 1944, he drafted to World War II, but was arrested on suspicion of being a member of an anti-Soviet group. He was rehabilitated in 1956, and returned to Moscow the next year.

He died by suicide by gunshot after 10 years of severe asthma.

== Filmography ==
- Seven Nannies (1962; co-written with Valeri Frid)
- Uninvented Story (1964; co-written with Frid and Ilya Zverev)
- There Was an Old Couple (1964; co-written with Frid)
- Two Comrades Were Serving (1968; co-written with Frid)
- An Old, Old Tale (1968; co-written with Frid)
- Shine, Shine, My Star (1969; co-written with Frid and Alexander Mitta)
- Shadow (1971; co-written with Frid)
- How Czar Peter the Great Married Off His Moor (1976; co-written with Frid and Mitta)
- Widows (1976; co-written with Frid)
- Air Crew (1979; co-written with Frid and Mitta)
- Sherlock Holmes and Dr. Watson (1979; co-written with Frid)
- The Gadfly (1980; co-written with Frid)
- The Story of Voyages (1982; co-written with Frid and Mitta)
- And Then Came Bumbo... (1984; co-written with Frid; released posthumously)
