= Vladimir Etush =

Soviet and Russian actor (1922–2019)

- Владимир Этуш
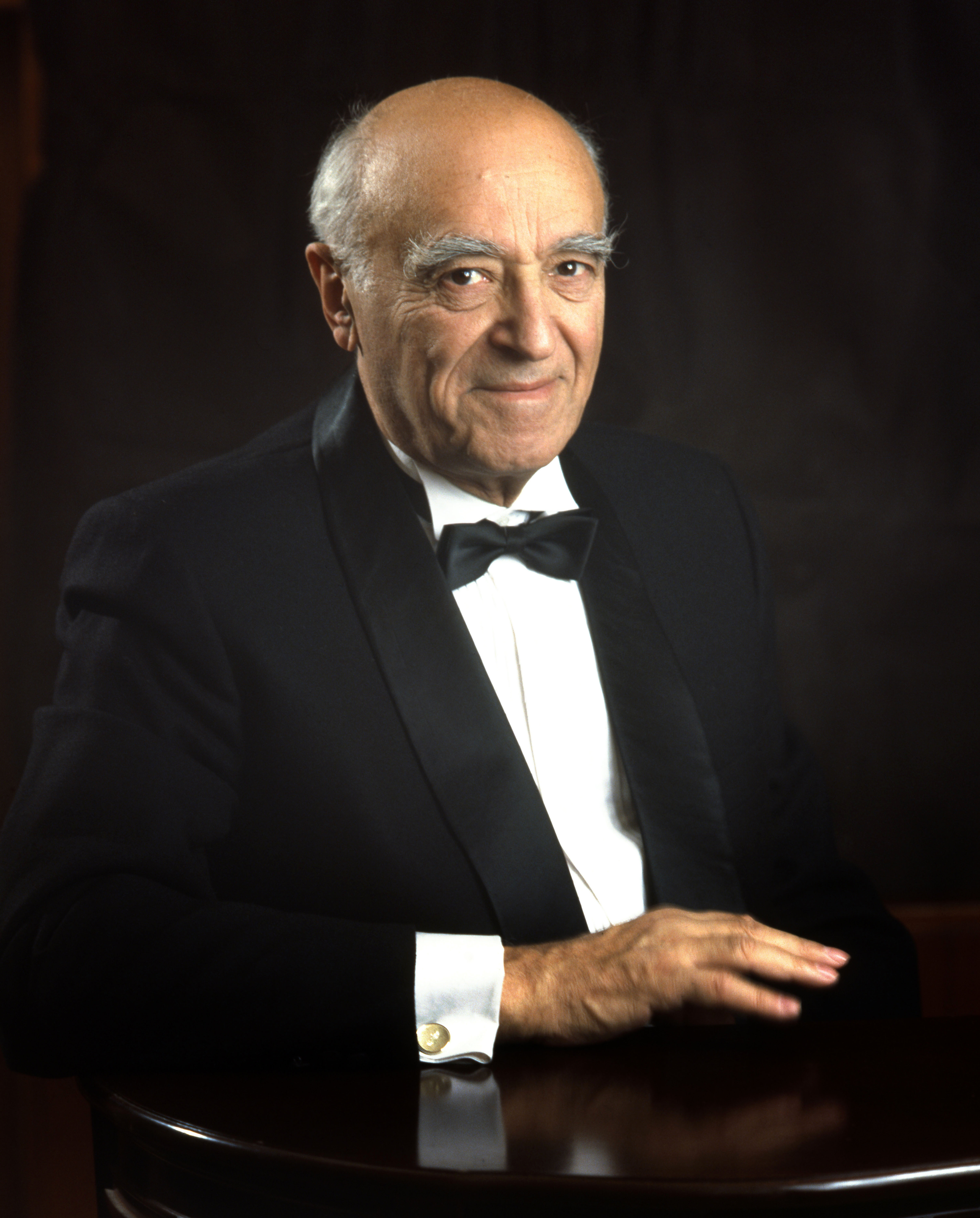
- Etush in 2000
- Born: May 6, 1922; Moscow, Russian SFSR, Soviet Union
- Died: March 9, 2019 (aged 96); Moscow, Russia
- Occupations: Actor, theater pedagogue
- Years active: 1944–2019
- Spouse: Yelena Gorbunova
- Honours: People's Artist of the USSR (1984)

Vladimir Abramovich Etush (Note: Russian: Владимир Абрамович Этуш, romanized: Vladimir Abramovich Etush) (6 May 1922 – 9 March 2019) was a Soviet and Russian film and theater actor of Jewish descent. People's Artist of the USSR (1984).

== Biography ==
He was born on 6 May 1922 in Moscow into a Jewish family. Father - Abram Shakhnovich Etush (1888-1967). Mother - Raisa Godievna Etush (1900-1954), until the first arrest of her husband (Abram Shakhnovich was arrested twice) was a housewife, then worked as a cashier in a photo studio. Sister - Lydia (born in 1929), music teacher.

== Personal life ==
Etush was married four times.

- Ninel Myshkova (born 1926; died 2003) — actress, the only daughter of General Konstantin Myshkov
- Yelena Izmaylova (born 1920; died 2005) — actress, civil marriage
- Nina Craynova (born 1927; died 2000) — English language teacher
- Yelena Gorbunova (born 1965) — English language teacher

He had a daughter, actress Raisa Etush (born 1955), from his marriage with Craynova.

== Career ==
=== Partial filmography ===
- Admiral Ushakov (1953) as Capt. Said-Ali
- The Gadfly (1955) as Martini
- The Chairman (1964) as Colonel Kaloyev
- Stewardess (1967) as Caucasian passenger
- Kidnapping, Caucasian Style (1967) as comrade Saakhov
- An Old, Old Tale (1968) as the king / innkeeper
- Solaris (1968, TV Movie) as Dr. Snaut
- The Twelve Chairs (1971) as Andrei Bruns
- Shadow (1971) as Pietro, Annunziata's father, hotel keeper, man eater
- Mission in Kabul (1971) as Abdulla-Khan
- Incorrigible Liar (1973) as Prince of Burukhtania Emir Burokhtan Second Second
- Ivan Vasilievich: Back to the Future (1973) as Anton Semyonovich Shpak, dentist
- The Adventures of Buratino (1976, TV Movie) as Karabas Barabas
- How Ivanushka the Fool Travelled in Search of Wonder (1977) as Fakir
- 31 June (1978, TV Movie) as Malgrim, Master of black and white magic
- The Donkey's Hide (1982) as King Gaston IX
- Classic (1998) as Monarch
- The Three Musketeers (2013) as Gerbier

== Honours and awards ==
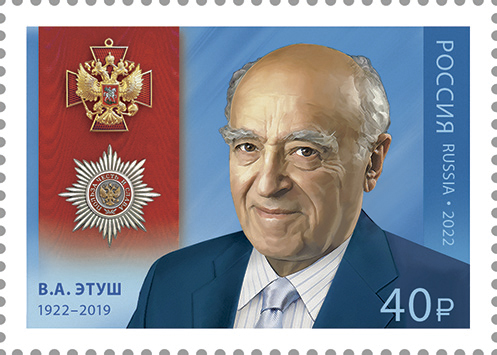
Etush on a 2022 stamp of Russia

- Medal of Zhukov
- 1943 — Order of the Red Star
- 1964 — Honored Artist of the RSFSR
- 1971 — People's Artist of the RSFSR
- 1984 — People's Artist of the USSR
- 1985 — Order of the Patriotic War, 1st class
- Order "For Merit to the Fatherland":
  - 1985 — 4th class for services to the state, the progress made in labor, science, culture, art, and a great contribution to strengthening friendship and cooperation between nations
  - 2003 — 3rd class for his great contribution to the development of national culture and theater education'
  - 2008 — 2nd class for his outstanding contribution to the development of theatrical art and many years of teaching activity
  - 2018 — 1st class for his outstanding contribution to the development of theatrical art and many years of creative activity
- 2001 — State Prize of the Russian Federation in Literature and Art for his role in the play Uncle's Dream (10 June 2002)
- 2005 — Commander of the Order For Contribution to Victory
- 2007 — Order of Saint Alexander Nevsky for Fatherland and writings
- 2008 — Order of Honorary Citizen of Russia
- 2008 — Order of Diaghilev for the benefit of Russian culture
- Order of Peter the Great, 1st class
- 2017 — Golden Mask
