= Doctor Kalyuzhnyy =

1939 film by Erast Garin

- Russian: Доктор Калюжный
- Directed by: Erast Garin; Khesya Lokshina
- Written by: Yuri German
- Starring: Boris Tolmazov; Mariya Barabanova; Yuriy Tolubeev; Yanina Zheymo; Arkady Raikin
- Cinematography: Anatoli Pogorely; Aleksandr Sigaev
- Release date: 1939
- Country: Soviet Union

Doctor Kalyuzhnyy, (Russian: Доктор Калюжный) is a 1939 Soviet drama film directed by Erast Garin and written by Yuri German based on his piece Son of the People (Сын народа).

== Plot ==
The film tells about a young doctor Kuzma, who, after graduating from the Leningrad Institute, leaves his beloved girl in Leningrad and returns to the Grechishka village where he was born and starts working there.

== Cast ==
- Boris Tolmazov as Doctor Kalyuzhny
- Mariya Barabanova as Timofeyich
- Yuriy Tolubeev
- Yanina Zheymo
- Arkady Raikin
- Valentin Kiselyov
- L. Oreshkin
- Zinaida Kvyatkovskaya
- T. Sukova
- Konstantin Sorokin
- G. Gudarov
- Yekaterina Melentyeva as Frosya
