= Be Careful, Grandma! =

1960 Soviet film

- Russian: Осторожно, бабушка!
- Directed by: Nadezhda Kosheverova
- Written by: Konstantin Isaev
- Produced by: Pyotr Sviridov
- Starring: Faina Ranevskaya; Ariadna Shengelaya; Lyudmila Markeliya; Svetlana Kharitonova; Nina Urgant
- Cinematography: Sergei Ivanov
- Edited by: E. Mironova
- Music by: Vasily Solovyov-Sedoi
- Production company: Lenfilm
- Release date: 1960
- Running time: 80 min.
- Country: Soviet Union
- Language: Russian

Be Careful, Grandma! (Russian: Осторожно, бабушка!, romanized: Ostorozhno, babushka!) is a 1960 Soviet musical comedy film directed by Nadezhda Kosheverova.

== Plot ==
The film's plot is about a girl and her active and stubborn grandmother, who wants to build a new House of Culture and attract Komsomol members.

== Cast ==
- Faina Ranevskaya as Yelena Timofeyevna
- Ariadna Shengelaya as Lena
- Lyudmila Markeliya as Shurok
- Svetlana Kharitonova as Shura
- Nina Urgant as Aleksandra
- Yulian Panich as Vasya Kazachkov
- Leonid Bykov as Lyosha Shtykov
- Leonid Satanovskiy as Nikolay
- Sergey Filippov as Innokenty Prokhorovich Prokhorov
- Rolan Bykov as Ivan Ilyich
