= How Ivanushka the Fool Travelled in Search of Wonder =

- Directed by: Nadezhda Kosheverova
- Screenplay by: Mikhail Volpin
- Starring: Oleg Dal; Elena Proklova; Mikhail Gluzskiy; Tatyana Pelttser
- Cinematography: Eduard Rozovsky
- Music by: Mieczysław Weinberg
- Distributed by: Lenfilm
- Release date: 1977
- Running time: 88 min
- Country: Soviet Union
- Language: Russian

How Ivanushka the Fool Travelled in Search of Wonder (Note: Ivanushka the Fool is an archetypal Russian Ivan the Fool) (Russian: Как Иванушка-дурачок за чудом ходил; trans. Kak Ivanushka-durachok za chudom khodil) is a 1977 Soviet fantasy film produced by Lenfilm studio, and directed by Nadezhda Kosheverova.

== Plot ==
Ivanushka the Fool encounters a robber in the forest. After a struggle, he takes the stolen goods back to their owner, a wealthy merchant named Marko Petrovich Bogaty. At Marko’s home, Ivanushka meets his daughter, Nastya, and they fall in love. However, Marko disapproves of the match and hires a woman named Baba Varvara to poison Ivanushka. Nastya, aware of her father’s plan, sends Ivanushka a letter warning him of the danger. Varvara’s attempt to poison him fails, and she reveals the truth to Ivanushka, suggesting they escape together. Varvara then returns to tell Marko that Ivanushka has supposedly died. Upon hearing this, Nastya faints and falls into a deep stupor. Marko summons a foreign healer who manages to revive her physically, but her emotions remain numb. The healer tells Marko that only a miracle can restore Nastya's feelings.

At Varvara’s request, Ivanushka seeks help from Baba Yaga, who advises him to visit the wizard Lukomor. Setting off on his journey, Ivanushka has his horse stolen by a horse thief named Fyodor, who tricks Ivanushka into believing he was once transformed into a horse by a sorcerer. Ivanushka, ever trusting, gives Fyodor his last bit of money, stirring Fyodor’s conscience, who then returns the horse. Ivanushka outwits a king as he travels through a distant kingdom, eventually meeting Lukomor and restoring his faith in humanity. In gratitude, Lukomor gives Ivanushka magical items: a chalkboard with chalk and a pair of speedy horseshoes. Meanwhile, back home, a fraud named Ali-Baba Evstyugneev tries to cure Nastya but fails. Using the magical chalkboard, Ivanushka finally succeeds in healing Nastya, reuniting them in love.

== Cast ==
- Oleg Dahl as Ivanushka the Fool
- Elena Proklova as Nastenka
- Mikhail Gluzskiy as Marko Bogatyi
- Tatyana Pelttser as Baba Varvara
- Vladimir Etush as Fakir
- Andrei Popov as Lukomor Lukomorich
- Aleksandr Benyaminov as Luka
- Mariya Barabanova as Baba Yaga
- Igor Dmitriev as the king
- Mikhail Boyarskiy as Fyodor Ivanovich
- Sergey Filippov as Zamorskiy lekar
- Boris Arakelov as the thief
- Aleksandr Afanasev as Sluga
- Gennadi Dyudyayev as Vasiliy
