= Nadezhda Kosheverova =

Soviet film director and screenwriter (1902–1989)

- Born: Nadezhda Nikolayevna Kosheverova; September 23, 1902; Saint Petersburg, Russian Empire
- Died: February 22, 1989 (aged 86); Moscow, Soviet Union
- Occupations: Film director; screenwriter
- Years active: 1923–1987
- Known for: Cinderella
- Spouses: Nikolay Akimov; Andrei Moskvin
- Children: 1

Nadezhda Nikolayevna Kosheverova (Russian: Наде́жда Никола́евна Кошеве́рова; 23 September 1902 – 22 February 1989) was a Soviet film director and screenwriter who specialized in children's films.

== Life ==
Kosheverova was born in Saint Petersburg to Nikolai Kosheverov, a merchant with a house on Sergievskaya Street. As a girl she was fond of dolls and puppets, which she explained as her inspiration for entering the world of cinema: "The cinema is like a puppet theater, because a lot of people work on creating the film, and the viewer sees only what they are supposed to see."

In 1923 she graduated from the acting school of the Bolshaya Komediya Theater and until 1928 worked as an actress in the theaters of Leningrad, including at Leningrad Comedy Theatre under Nikolay Akimov. In the late twenties she studied at the Factory of the Eccentric Actor (FEKS), an avant-garde acting collective.

Beginning in 1929 she worked at Lenfilm, first as an assistant director on The Youth of Maxim (1934), The Return of Maxim (1937), and The Vyborg Side (1939).

Her first effort as a director was Once in Autumn (1937), which has since been lost. Her first success was the musical comedy Arinka (1939), directed in collaboration with Yuri Muzykant.

Before the outbreak of World War II she directed Galya, a film whose subject matter (related to the Winter War) led to its being banned from release.

In 1944 Kosheverova turned to the fairy tale genre, which would remain her main focus for the rest of her career. Her first fairy-tale feature was the film-opera Cherevichki (1944), directed in collaboration with Mikhail Shapiro.

In 1947 she experienced considerable success with Cinderella, another collaboration with Shapiro. The film was praised for its performances and script by Evgeny Schwartz. Kosheverova would go on to create other hit comedies (Shofyor Ponyevolye (1958) and Be Careful, Grandma! (1960). Several of her films starred Oleg Dal.

In 1963 Kosheverova and Mikhail Shapiro collaborated on Cain XVIII, a fairy tale film with political undertones, and a script by Nikolai Erdman. The script was carefully revised to avoid giving offense to the censors, but a scene of cross-dressing infuriated Nikita Khrushchev, who ordered the film banned as "homosexual propaganda". It was not shown again until the 1990s.

Kosheverova's last directorial work was the 1987 film The Tale of the Painter in Love.

She died in Moscow on 22 February 1989, and is buried in the village of Komarovo near Saint Petersburg.

== Family ==
Her first husband was film director Nikolay Akimov, with whom she collaborated on the films Cinderella and Shadows. Her second husband was the director of photography Andrei Moskvin, her collaborator on the Maxim films and The Vyborg Side. Her second marriage produced a son, Nikolai.

== Filmography ==
=== As director ===
- 1939: Arinka
- 1940: Galya
- 1944: Cherevichki (with Mikhail Shapiro)
- 1947: Cinderella (with Mikhail Shapiro)
- 1953: Spring in Moscow (with Iosif Kheifits)
- 1954: Tamer of Tigers (with Aleksandr Ivanovsky)
- 1956: Honeymoon
- 1958: Shofyor Ponyedolye
- 1960: Be Careful, Grandma!
- 1963: Cain XVIII (with Mikhail Shapiro)
- 1966: New Attraction Today
- 1968: An Old, Old Tale
- 1971: Shadow
- 1974: Tsarevich Prosha
- 1977: How Ivanushka the Fool Travelled in Search of Wonder
- 1979: The Nightingale
- 1982: The Donkey's Hide
- 1984: And Then Came Bumbo...
- 1987: The Tale about the Painter in Love

=== As screenwriter ===
- 1944: Cherevichki (with Mikhail Shapiro)
- 1953: Spring in Moscow
