= Nikolay Trofimov =

- Николай Трофимов
- Born: Nikolay Nikolaevich Trofimov; 21 January 1920; Sevastopol, Taurida Governorate, USSR
- Died: 7 September 2005 (aged 85); Saint-Petersburg, Russia
- Occupation: Actor
- Years active: 1934—2005

Nikolay Nikolaevich Trofimov (Russian: Никола́й Никола́евич Трофи́мов; 21 January 1920 — 7 November 2005) was a Soviet and Russian theater and film actor. People's Artist of the USSR (1990).

== Biography ==
Nikolay Trofimov was born into a working-class family. Stage career began in 1934.

During the Great Patriotic War, he served in the navy.

On the stage of the Tovstonogov Bolshoi Drama Theater, he played more than 40 roles. In the cinema, Nikolai Trofimov played mostly small roles.

Nikolay Nikolaevich Trofimov died on the night of 7 November 2005 in the St. Petersburg Alexandrovsky Hospital from the consequences of a stroke. He was buried on 14 November at the Literary Sheds of Volkovskoye Cemetery.

== Selected filmography ==
- Pirogov (Russian: Пирогов, 1947) as pieman
- Belinsky (Белинский, 1951) as typographic worker
- Tamer of Tigers (Укротительница тигров, 1954) as Myshkin
- Striped Trip (Полосатый рейс, 1961) as navigator
- Cain XVIII (Каин XVIII, 1963) as Agent 214
- Torrents of Steel (Железный поток, 1967) as soldier Chirik
- War and Peace (Война и мир, 1967) as captain Tushin
- Chronicles of a Dive Bomber (Хроника пикирующего бомбардировщика, 1967) as major, commandant of the airfield
- The Diamond Arm (Бриллиантовая рука, 1968) as Colonel of militsiya
- On the Way to Berlin (На пути в Берлин) as Ivan Zaytsev
- Tchaikovsky (Чайковский, 1970) as chief of police
- Afrikanych (Африканыч, 1970) as Ivan Afrikanych
- About the Little Red Riding Hood (Про Красную Шапочку, 1977) as Small Fat Wolf
- The Circus Princess (Принцесса цирка, 1982) as Duke
- In the Old Rhythms (В старых ритмах, 1982) as Shtykov

== Awards ==
- Honored Artist of the RSFSR (1960)
- People's Artist of the RSFSR (1974)
- People's Artist of the USSR (12 December 1990) - for great services in the development of Soviet theater art
- Order "For Merit to the Fatherland" 4th class (2000) - for the great contribution to the development of the domestic theatrical art
- Order of the Patriotic War 2nd class (1985)
- Order of the Red Star
- Medal "For the Victory over Germany in the Great Patriotic War 1941–1945"
