= Svetlana Kharitonova =

Russian actress

Svetlana Kharitonova in 1961

Svetlana Nikolayevna Kharitonova (Russian: Светлана Николаевна Харитонова; 30 January 1932 in Moscow – 8 January 2012 in Moscow) was a Russian actress. She performed in more than fifty films between 1955 and 1991.

She was the first wife of actor Leonid Kharitonov.

She died on January 8, 2012 in Moscow after a long illness, three weeks before her 80th birthday. The urn with her ashes was buried on January 16, 2012 at the Khovanskoye Cemetery.

== Selected filmography ==
Film
| Year | Title | Role | Notes |
|---|---|---|---|
| 1990 | Stalin's Funeral (Похороны Сталина) | Zhenya's aunt | |
| 1987 | Visit to Minotaur (Визит к Минотавру) | Yevdokia Obolnikova | |
| 1978 | Citizen Nikanorova Waits for You (Вас ожидает гражданка Никанорова) | neighbor Lyuda | |
| 1977 | An Almost Funny Story (Почти смешная история) | conductor | |
| 1976 | White Bim Black Ear (Белый Бим Чёрное ухо) | teacher Anna Pavlovna | |
| 1975 | It Can't Be! (Не может быть!) | Elmira, Catherine's girlfriend | |
| 1967 | Magician (Фокусник) | Sasha | |
| 1965 | Your Son and Brother (Ваш сын и брат) | apothecary | |
| 1962 | A Trip Without a Load (Порожний рейс) | Tonya Kryukova | |
| 1961 | My Friend, Kolka! (Друг мой, Колька) | Yevgenia Petrovna | |
| 1960 | Be Careful, Grandma! (Осторожно, бабушка!) | Shura | |
| 1959 | The Unamenables (Неподдающиеся) | Nadya | |
| 1958 | The Girl Without an Address (Девушка без адреса) | Klava | |
| 1957 | The Cranes Are Flying (Летят журавли) | Irina Borozdina | |
| 1955 | Private Ivan (Солдат Иван Бровкин) | Lybasha's friend | |
