= Ekipazh =

Ekipazh (Russian: экипаж) may refer to:

- A generic Russian term for a passenger horse-drawn vehicle
- A Russian word for "crew":
  - Ekipazh, the original Russian title for the 1980 disaster film Air Crew
  - Ekipazh, Russian musical group of 1980s, see Sergey Penkin
