= Archil Gomiashvili =

Soviet and Russian actor (1926–2005)

- არჩილ გომიაშვილი
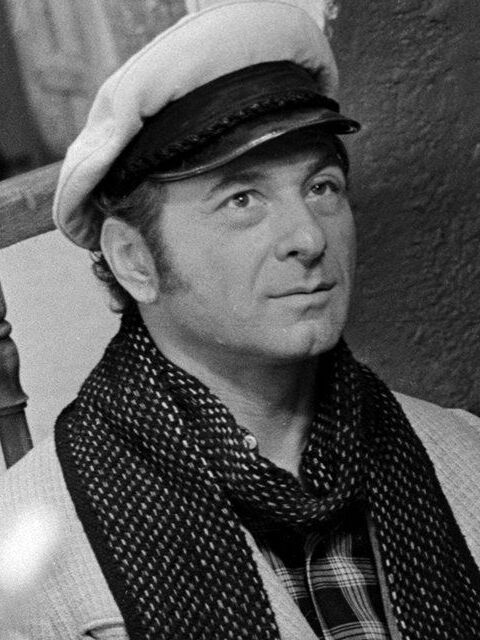
- 1970
- Born: არჩილ მიხეილის ძე გომიაშვილი March 23, 1926; Chiatura, Georgian SSR, Transcaucasian SFSR, USSR
- Died: May 31, 2005 (aged 79); Moscow, Russia
- Occupation: Actor
- Years active: 1938–1988
- Awards: People's Artist of the Georgian SSR (1966)

Archil Mikhaylovich Gomiashvili (Russian: Арчи́л Миха́йлович Гомиашви́ли, Georgian: არჩილ მიხეილის ძე გომიაშვილი; March 23, 1926 – May 31, 2005) was a Soviet Georgian theatre and film actor (People's Artist of Georgia, 1966) best known for his part of Ostap Bender in Leonid Gaidai's 1971 adaptation of Ilf and Petrov's The Twelve Chairs. In the late 1980s Gomiashvili quit the stage to become a businessman, the Ostap Bender Club owner, and philanthropist.

== Biography ==
Archil Gomiashvili was born on March 23, 1926, in Chiatura, Georgian SSR. His father, an Institute of Red Professors graduate, was the Donbas miners' trade-union leader, when in the years of the Great Purge he was arrested, to be freed only in 1944.

Having spent two years in the Tbilisi Academy of Arts' school, Archil Gomiashvili joined the Moscow Art Theatre's college-studio but had to leave Moscow in 1948 after an incident involving a fistfight. In 1958 he moved to Poti to join the Eristavi Theatre's troupe, then returned to Tbilisi as a member of the Russian Griboyedov Theatre.

Gomiashvili debuted on the big screen in 1957, playing Mantasherov in Personally Known, the first film of the Kamo trilogy. In 1961 he appeared in Cossacks after Leo Tolstoy's novelet. 1965 saw him cast in the Special Task, the second installment of the Kamo trilogy, as Mantasherov again, and Mikhail Chiaureli-directed musical comedy These Are New Times.

Gomiashvili's involvement with Ilf and Petrov's satire started in 1958 when, assisted by Yuri Lyubimov, he produced the musical called The Adventures of Ostap Bender (based on The Little Golden Calf novel) where he played all the roles, including that of Zosya Sinitsina. In 1971 Leonid Gaidai, looking for the lead for his adaptation of The Twelve Chairs, rehearsed 22 well-known actors (including Vladimir Vysotsky, Andrey Mironov, and Yevgeny Yevstigneev) to no avail. Then he found Gomiashvili who performed The Adventures of Ostap Bender in Gorky and signed the man. The actor's relationships with the director were strained throughout. According to Gomiashvili, Gaidai was trying to dumb down the Bender character whom the actor saw as being much more than just a brilliant crook. "The director wouldn't let me show the warmer side to my hero. As I saw the film I didn't like it at all," Gomiashvili said later.

Yet, it was Gaidai's Twelve Chairs that made Gomiashvili the Soviet movie star. He made it to the Top 10 most popular Soviet actors of 1971, was invited to the Soviet Council of Ministers's party and received by way of appreciation a luxurious flat (formerly that of Svetlana Alliluyeva) in the legendary House on the Embankment. In 1973 Gomiashvily joined the troupe of the Moscow Lenkom Theatre. In 1980–1988 he worked at the Moscow Pushkin Theatre. His 1971 triumph on the big screen, though, has never been repeated.

At the age of 62 Archil Gomiashvili quit the stage to become a successful businessman, the prestigious Ostap Bender Club owner, and philanthropist. He continued to appear in films occasionally and in 1985–1994 played Yosif Stalin five times. In the early 2000s he said in an interview:

Thirty years are the whole life and I’ve lived this life as/with Ostap. He made me famous, got me a Moscow flat and this restaurant named in his honour... And you know, I think we have a lot in common. We both are actors in need of an audience. Without an audience I need neither chairs nor the money.

In 2004 Archil Gomiashvili was diagnosed with lung cancer. He died on May 31, 2005, in Moscow and on June 3, 2005 he was interred in Troyekurovskoye Cemetery.

== Filmography ==
- Personally Known (Litchno izvesten, 1957) as Mantasherov
- Andzamb tchanachum em (1958) (uncredited)
- The Mole (Krot, 1962) as Zurabi
- Rats ginakhavs, vegar nakhav (1965) as Kostaya
- The Special Task (Tchrezvychaynoye porucheniye, 1965) as Mantasherov
- Bodishi, tkven gelit sikvdili (1965)
- These Are Different Times (Inyie nynche vremena, 1965) as Kakhta
- Artakarg handznararutyun (1966)
- Paytyun kesgisherits heto (1969)
- The Twelve Chairs (Dvenadtsat stulyev, 1971) as Ostap Bender
- Mimino (1977) as Nugzar Papishvili
- The Caucasian Tale (Kavkazskaya povest, 1977) as Yeroshka
- My Love, My Sorrow (Lyubov moya, petchal moya, 1978) as Ashraf
- The Comedy of Days Long Gone (Komediya davno minuvshikh dney, 1980) as Ostap Bender
- The Golden Fleece (Zolotoye runo, 1982) as Yakov
- Early, Early Morning (Ranneye, Ranneya utro, 1983, TV Mini-Series) as Gordey Lukich
- The Copper Angel (Medny Angel, 1984) as Valdez, the gangster
- Skapen's Pranks (Prodelki Skapena, 1985) as Skapen
- The State Border. 1941 (Gosudarstvennaya granitsa, 1985) as Yosif Stalin
- My Favourite Clown (Moi lyubimyi kloun, 1987) as Pasha Fokin
- Stalingrad (1990) as Josef Stalin
- Superment (1990) as Kadaev
- The War on the Western Front (Voina na zapadnom napravlenii, 1990, TV Mini-Series) as Yosif Stalin
- Mesto ubiytsy vakantno... (1991) as Militia dept. chief
- The Waiter With a Golden Tray (Ofitsiant s zolotym podnosom, 1992) as Shota Chanturiya
- Angels of Death (Angely smerti, 1993) as Yosif Stalin
- The Tragedy of the Century (Tragediya veka, 1994) as Yosif Stalin
