= The Donkey's Hide =

- Directed by: Nadezhda Kosheverova
- Screenplay by: Mikhail Volpin
- Story by: Charles Perrault
- Starring: Vladimir Etush; Svetlana Nemolyaeva; Vera Novikova; Aleksandr Galibin
- Cinematography: Eduard Rozovsky
- Music by: Moisey Vaynberg
- Distributed by: Lenfilm
- Release date: 1982
- Running time: 85 min
- Country: Soviet Union
- Language: Russian

The Donkey's Hide (Russian: Ослиная шкура) is a 1982 Soviet fantasy film based on Charles Perrault's Donkeyskin. Participant of the KinderFilmFest program at the 1985 Berlin International Film Festival.

== Plot ==
A bunch of paintings come to life and one of them proceeds to tell the story. A princess ran away from her courtly life, disguising herself in the skin of a donkey that excreted gold coins. When a prince sees her dressed like a princess, he tries to find out who she is.

== Cast ==
- Vladimir Etush: King Gaston IX
- Svetlana Nemolyaeva: Queen Gorgette
- Vera Novikova: Princess Theresa
- Aleksandr Galibin: Prince Jacques
- Zinoviy Gerdt: Poet Laureate to King Gaston IX
- Tatyana Pelttser: Wicked Fairy
- Valentina Panina: Good Fairy
- Nikolai Karachentsov: Robber Burabo
- Lyudmila Makarova: Madame Burabo
- Sergei Parshin: Redhead
- Boris Arakelov: Gendarme
- Aleksandr Domashov: Dandy
- Sergey Filippov: Courtier
- Sergei Ivanov: Courtier
- Mariya Barabanova: Blind Old Woman
