= Saint Petersburg Comedy Theatre =

Coordinates: 59.9342°N 30.3381°E

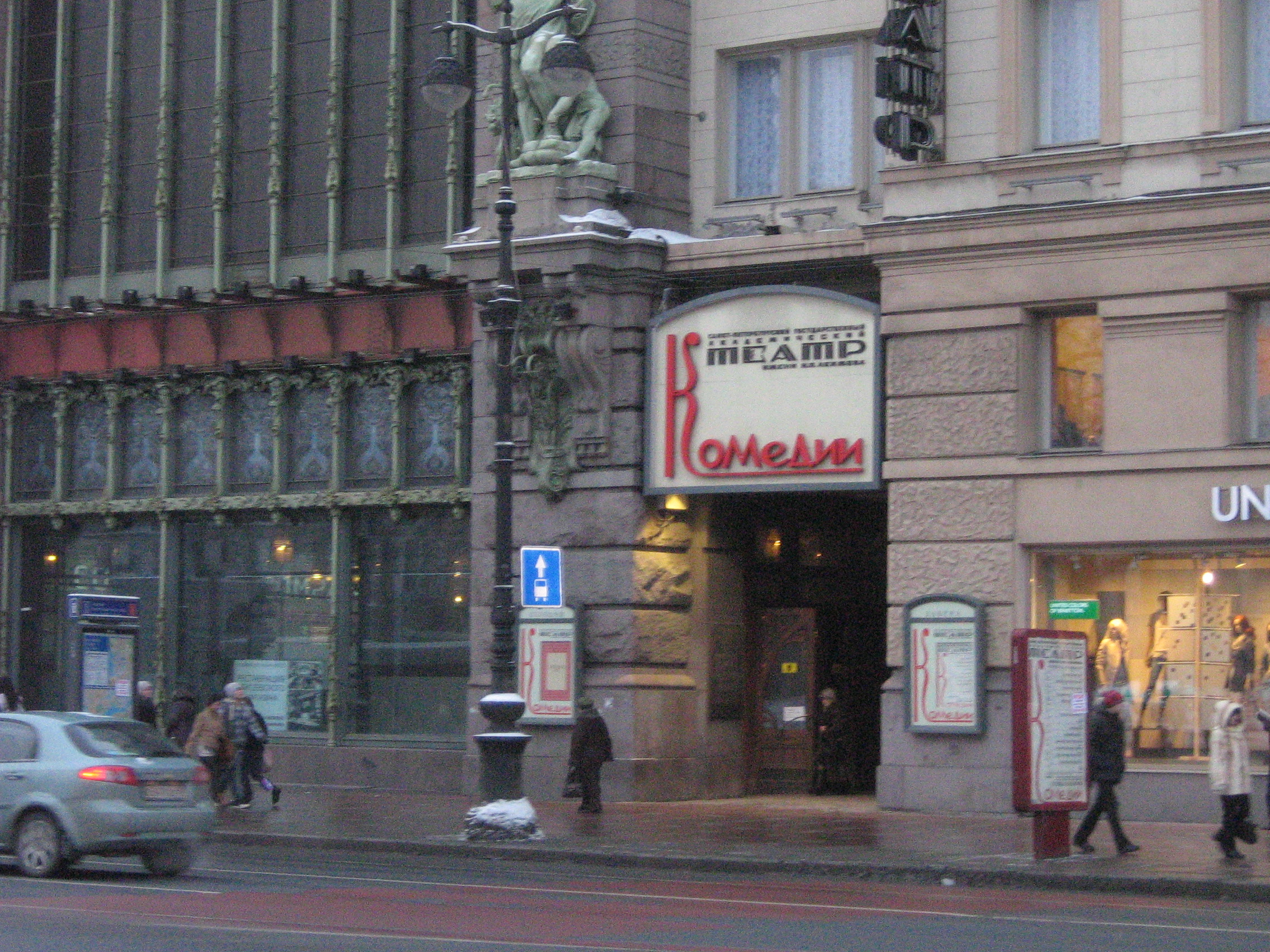
Comedy Theatre

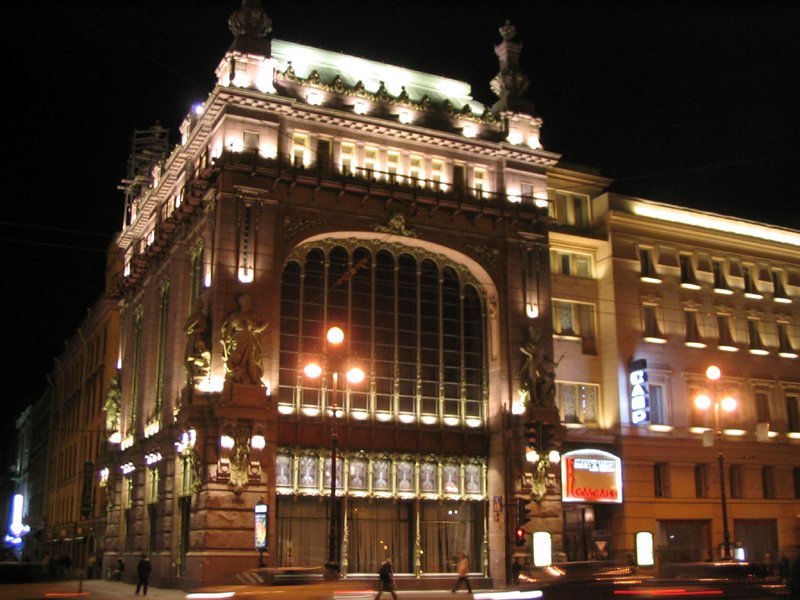
At night

The Nikolay Akimov Saint Petersburg Comedy Theatre (Russian: Санкт-Петербургский академический театр комедии им. Н. П. Акимова) is a theatre at 56 Nevsky Prospect, Saint Petersburg, Russia.
