= Tatyana Piletskaya =

Soviet and Russian actress

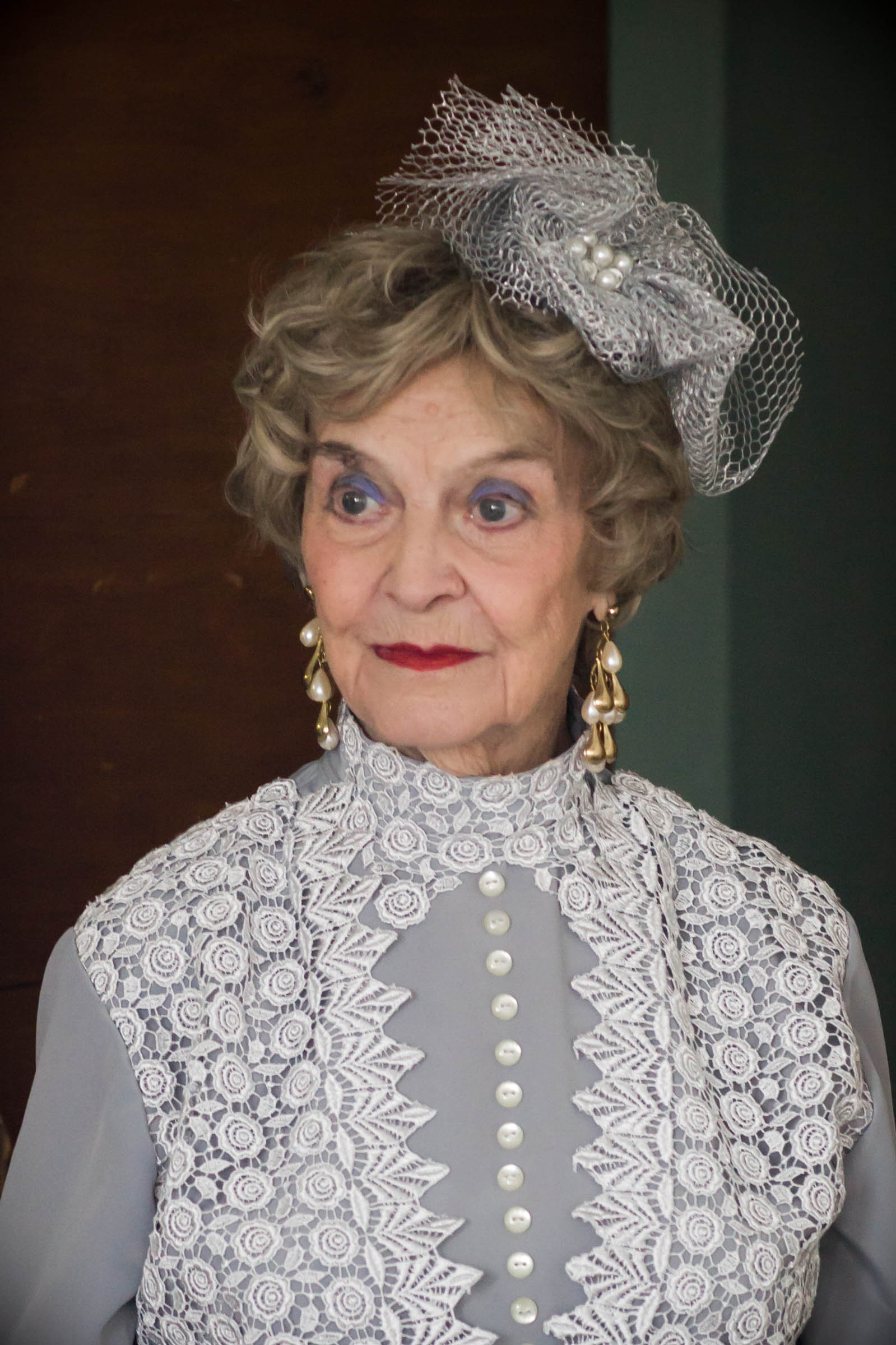

Tatyana Lvovna Piletskaya PAR (Russian: Татьяна Львовна Пиле́цкая; born July 2, 1928) is a Soviet and Russian film and stage actress. She was born in Leningrad, USSR.
