= Valeri Frid =

Soviet screenwriter (1922-1998)

Valeri Semyonovich Frid (Russian: Валерий Семёнович Фрид, 13 January 1922 – 7 September 1998) was a Soviet screenwriter. Most of his works were made together with Yuli Dunsky. Both of them were imprisoned in Gulag labor camps.

== Filmography ==
=== Writer ===
- 1991 Lost in Siberia
- 1990 Death in Сinema
- 1987 The Tale of the Painter in Love
- 1984 And Then Came Bumbo
- 1983 Every Tenth
- 1983 Adventures of the Little Muk
- 1982 The Story of the Voyages
- 1981 Don't be Afraid, I'm with You
- 1980 Air Crew
- 1980 The Gadfly
- 1979 The Adventures of Sherlock Holmes and Dr. Watson: Bloody Signature
- 1979 The Adventures of Sherlock Holmes and Doctor Watson: Acquaintance
- 1976 How Czar Peter the Great Married Off His Moor
- 1976 The Widows
- 1974 High Title / For the Life on Earth
- 1973 High Title / I, Shapovalov T. P.
- 1971 The Shadow
- 1970 Shine, Shine, My Star
- 1969 An Old, Old Tale
- 1968 Bare et liv - historien om Fridtjof Nansen (Just One Life)
- 1968 Two Comrades Were Serving
- 1965 Once Upon a Time There Was an Old Man and an Old Woman
- 1964 An Unthinkable Story
- 1962 Seven Nannies
- 1962 Sixteenth Spring
- 1960 The Same Age
- 1957 The Case at Mine Eight

=== Actor ===
- 1998 Classicist
- 1968 Two Comrades Were Serving
- 1999 Chinese Tea-Set
