= Nikolay Akimov =

Soviet theatre director and scenic designer

- Николай Акимов
- Self-portrait
- Born: 16 April 1901; Kharkiv, Russian Empire
- Died: 6 September 1968 (aged 67); Moscow, Russian SFSR, Soviet Union
- Occupations: Theatre director, scenic designer

Nikolay Pavlovich Akimov (Note: Russian: Никола́й Па́влович Аки́мов, romanized: Nikolay Pavlovich Akimov) (16 April [O.S. 3 April] 1901 – 6 September 1968) was a Soviet experimental theatre director and scenic designer noted for his work with the Leningrad Comedy Theatre. His most notorious production was the cynical version of Hamlet (1932), with Ophelia as a drunken prostitute and the king's ghost as a clever mystification arranged by Hamlet. Akimov, who was the Comedy Theater director in 1935-1949 and 1956-1968, wrote several books, among them About Theater (О театре, 1962) and Not Just About Theater (Не только о театре, 1966), and was designated a People's Artist of the USSR in 1960.

Akimov was director of the New Theatre in Leningrad in the early 1950s.

The Saint Petersburg Comedy Theatre is named in his honour.

== Awards and honours ==
- Honoured Worker of the Arts Industry of the RSFSR (1939)
- People's Artist of the Tajik SSR (1944)
- People's Artist of the RSFSR (1945)
- People's Artist of the USSR (1960)
- Two Orders of the Red Banner of Labour (1939, 1961)
- Order of the Red Star
- Medal "For the Defence of Leningrad"
- Medal "For Valiant Labour in the Great Patriotic War 1941–1945"
- Medal "In Commemoration of the 250th Anniversary of Leningrad"
