= Petr Shelokhonov =

Soviet and Russian stage and film actor and director

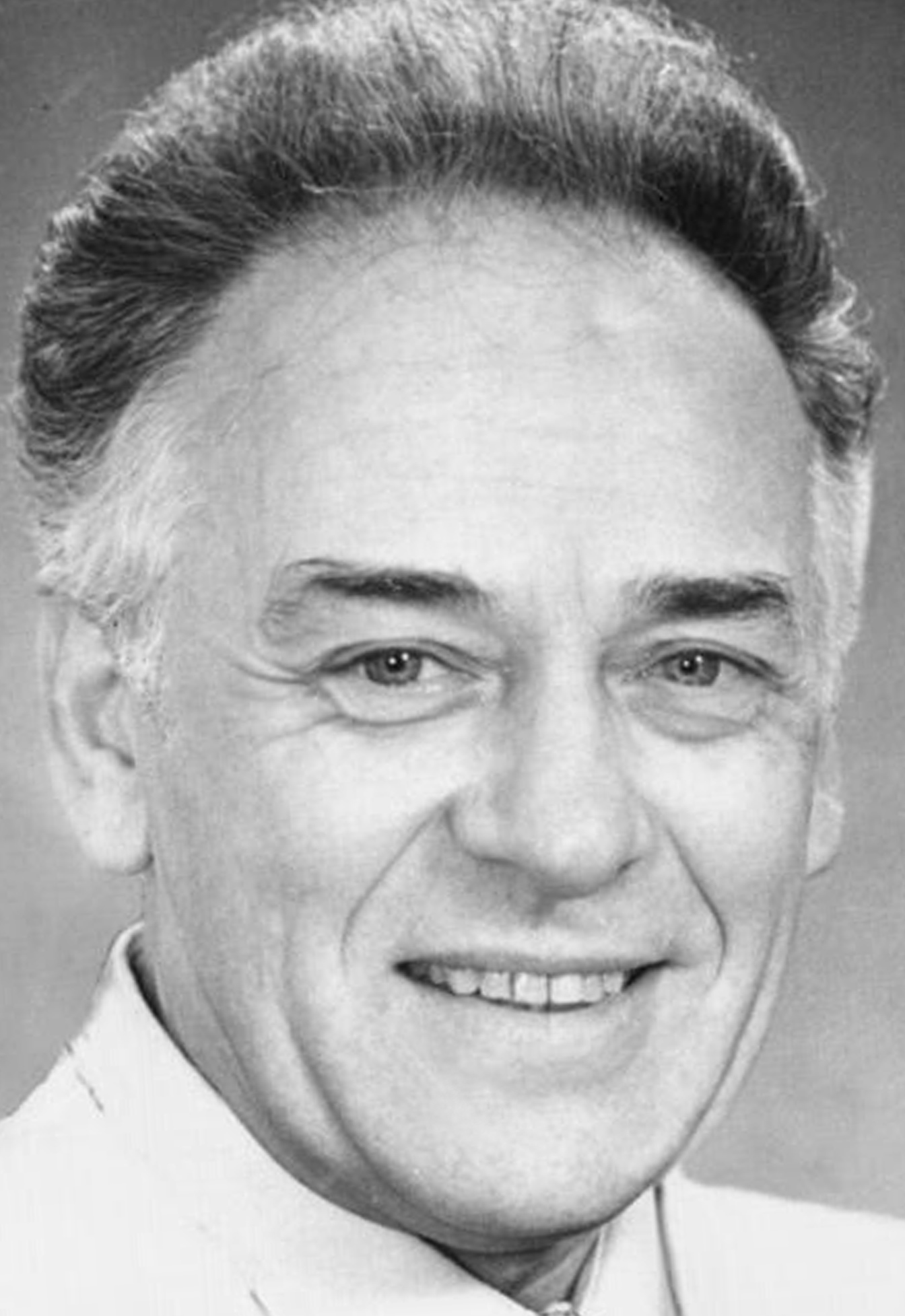
- Petr Shelokhonov
- Born: 15 August 1929; Wilno Voivodeship, Poland
- Died: 15 September 1999 (aged 70); St. Petersburg, Russia
- Citizenship: Poland (by birth, 1929 - 1939); USSR (1939 - 1991); Russia (1991 - 1999)
- Occupations: Actor; director; filmmaker
- Years active: 1942–1999
- Known for: Untangling, Dauria, Taming of the fire, Countermeasure, My Best Friend, General Vasili, Son of Joseph Stalin, Anna Karenina
- Height: 1.80 m (5 ft 11 in)
- Children: 2
- Awards: Honored Artist of the RSFSR; Medal "Veteran of Labour"
- Website: petr-shelokhonov-en.narod.ru

Petr Illarionovich Shelokhonov, (Polish: Piotr Szełochonow, Russian: Пётр Илларио́нович Шелохо́нов, Belarusian: Пятро Ларывонавіч Шэлахонаў, Ukrainian: Петро Іларіонович Шелохонов; in English also spelled 'Peter' or 'Pyotr' or 'Petr'; 15 August 1929 – 15 September 1999) was a Russian actor, director, filmmaker and socialite, designated Honorable Actor of Russia (1979). A strong proponent of making High culture accessible to all people, he organized social events for all people in artistic communities of St. Petersburg and Moscow using his position as member of the Union of Actors.

== Biography ==
=== Childhood ===
Petr Shelokhonov was born in 1929, in Wilno Voivodeship, then a part of Poland; Petr Larionovich Shelokhonov (also known as Peter, Pyotr, or Petro Larionovich Schelochonovich in Belarusian, Polish, Yiddish and Ukrainian). His ancestors originated from Ukraine, from Baltic states, and from Poland.

His father, Larion (Illarion) Titovich Shelokhonov, practiced veterinary medicine and was living at a horse farm, where his grandfather, Tito Shelohonovich, was also a farmer. The Russian Revolution and the Russian Civil War brought dramatic changes, so Larion Shelokhonov became a feldsher and practiced medicine raising the son to become a medical doctor. Petr rode horseback during his childhood; he studied biology and medicine under his father's tutelage, spending hours researching cells and tissues using his father's microscope. Petr Shelokhonov was destined to practice medicine, like his father, but his fate was changed by World War II.

=== World War II ===
Petr Shelokhonov survived the Nazi occupation during World War II. Following the German and Soviet invasion of Poland and the reshaping of Europe, Poland's borders were redrawn at the insistence of Soviet leader Joseph Stalin, and Petr Shelokhonov's birthplace was incorporated into the Byelorussian Soviet Socialist Republic that was swiftly occupied by German Wehrmacht in the summer of 1941. One terrible night his home was totally destroyed by Luftwaffe aerial bombing, he miraculously escaped the death by running away barefoot. He then witnessed the fire and destruction of the entire village when the German tanks leveled the remains of his house, then ruined his school and the horse farm. He tried to find his relatives until his cousin told him that there were no survivors. He was unable to find the remains of his mother, Anna Minska, to give her a proper traditional burial. He was separated from his father, who was away with horses. The Nazis arrested Petr but he escaped under heavy gunfire. Petr Shelokhonov was severely wounded in the forehead but he survived and dug a hole in the ground, to hide from Nazi police patrols during the autumn of 1941. There was no food, and people around were dying from starvation. Petr survived thanks to a wounded cow, which was blind and without calves, and her udders were full of milk. Petr used his veterinarian skills and befriended the cow, so he could suck her warm milk. Eventually, the wounded cow died. Then he learned how to explode German grenades to kill fish in a river. While doing that, he was arrested by the partisan patrol and joined the partisans in the woods.

=== Theatre ===
In 1942, while surviving in the woods with partisans, Petr Shelokhonov had his first acting experience. He performed improvised parodies of Adolf Hitler and the Nazis for his fellow partisans. His performances helped lift their spirits in a time when they were struggling to survive. This experience accentuated his humble, modest character. The scar on his forehead, the mark of war, made his acting career seem like an impossible dream; but Petr was determined – depending upon his roles he covered his scar with an appropriate theatrical makeup, wore a wig or used various hats. At first, he accompanied himself playing the accordion. Then he made puppets and a screen, and worked in his own puppet theater entertaining people during the war years. In his show, titled "Peter and the Wolf," he managed to lead four puppets with four voices, and also played the accordion. He traveled across Belarus and Ukraine with his puppet theatre and performed for bread and rare food packages from the American airlift. He spoke Polish, Yiddish, Russian, Belarusian, and his native Ukrainian, and he was very lucky to survive until the end of World War II.

=== Leningrad ===
In 1945, Petr Shelokhonov became a piano student at the Kiev Conservatory of Music, he also played the accordion onstage, albeit his plan was to become an actor in Leningrad. In 1946, he moved to Leningrad in pursuit of an acting career. Petr Shelokhonov was looking for a job with a jazz band, similar to his favorite bands of Leonid Utyosov and Eddie Rosner, so he joined a jazz band at the Leningrad Navy Club and also gave performances as a stand-up comedian and played the accordion. Pyotr Ilyich Tchaikovsky, Sergei Prokofiev and Sergei Rachmaninov were his favorites as well as the music of Glenn Miller, Louis Armstrong, Frank Sinatra, Ella Fitzgerald and other stars heard on the Voice of America radio shows. Petr's love of music and his passion for acting, which was generously peppered with his free-spirited humor, protected his peaceful soul and positive disposition and helped him survive through the roughest realities of life under Soviet communism; but when his free-spirited humor angered the hard-liners, many doors closed. The city that stood the attack of Hitler's armies and was terribly ruined but not destroyed by the nightmares of war and the Siege, where depleted people stood in lines for bread, now Stalin's supporters resumed purges. In 1946, the persecution of creative intellectuals began, so publishers, magazines, and theaters were closed. In the war-ravaged and repressed city, new people from all over poured in and with fresh forces, they attempted to restore normal life. But Stalin's regime again brutally purged the city during the Leningrad affair killing the mayor and other leaders and survivors of WW2. At that time, Petr Shelokhonov was detained by the Soviet authorities and was forced to work hard labour for several months on the construction grounds for the Kirov Stadium in Leningrad until he was drafted into the Soviet Navy.

=== Baltic Sea ===
In 1949, Petr Shelokhonov was conscripted into the Soviet Armed Forces in Leningrad, and then he served in the Red Navy for five years. Petr began his service as a seaman part of the crew in charge of smoke screen devices on ships of the Baltic Fleet. There he was soon arrested for telling a political joke. Petr was detained for several days at the strict guardhouse – military detention facility. That experience did not break his will, as he used humor to survive. From 1949 to 1954 he served in the Soviet Navy stationed in Kaliningrad, Klaipėda and Liepāja. Peter eventually moved up from a sailor to actor with the Theatre of the Baltic Fleet in the city of Liepāja. There he delivered many radio and stage performances, earning critical acclaim and an Honorable Note from the Republic of Latvia. In 1952, in Liepāja, he did a great job at the gala concert of the Baltic Fleet delivering exceptional performance and attracting the attention of Admirals Kharlamov and Golovko, and not only them. Petr noticed being followed. He was "caught" in the radio room listening to foreign radio stations - Frank Sinatra's voice. At that time Stalin ordered radio jamming of foreign radio stations throughout the USSR, but there was no radio interference on the sea, and the sailors listened to prohibited radio broadcasts. Listening to "enemy voices" was then a serious accusation. Petr Shelokhonov was punished again for telling political jokes and for listening to foreign radio stations, such as the Voice of America and the BBC. Listening to foreign radio stations was considered anti-soviet activity, a punishable crime in the Soviet Union during the Cold War.

But even after the guardhouse, again and again, as if spellbound, he continued to listen to his favorite music on the radio: Frank Sinatra, Bing Crosby, Glenn Miller, Louis Armstrong, Ella Fitzgerald, and understood that the big world lives a different life, that is full of joy and happiness. In 1954, Petr Shelokhonov was discharged from the Red Navy and applied to the Leningrad State Institute of Theatre, Music, and Cinema, but the school refused to accept him because of his scarred face and bad anti-soviet record. Peter's free-spirited humor only angered the hard-liners, so for him, many doors closed.

=== Siberia ===
After that, Petr's acting career was limited to Siberia, where he remained under suspicion as did many other survivors who were held by the Nazis in occupied territory during World War II. He managed to survive through the roughest realities of life under Soviet communism; but he did not stop telling funny political jokes about the Soviet leadership, so when his free spirited humor angered the hard liners, many doors closed. He moved to the Siberian city of Irkutsk and studied acting at the Irkutsk drama school, graduating in 1960, as an actor. Petr Shelokhonov was member of the Irkutsk State Drama Theater from 1957 to 1962. There he created a variety of characters ranging from Soviet working class heroes to Hamlet in Shakespeare's play.

=== Chekhov's Theatre ===
From 1962 to 1968, Petr Shelokhonov worked as an actor and director at the Chekhov Drama Theatre in the city of Taganrog, Russia. There Shelokhonov created leading roles in several new productions of such classic plays by Anton Chekhov as Uncle Vanya in Uncle Vanya (Дядя Ваня), Ivanov in Ivanov (Иванов), Tuzenbach in Three Sisters (Три сестры), and Treplev in The Seagull (Чайка). In The Cherry Orchard, which he co-directed, he also played two opposing characters on different nights, alternating between the roles as Gayev, and as Lopakhin. Shelokhonov also appeared as Satin in The Lower Depths (На дне) by Maxim Gorky and as Derzhavin in Friends and Years by Leonid Zorin. His favorite role of that period was Platonov in the eponymous play by Anton Chekhov. In 1967, for the 50th anniversary of the Russian Revolution of 1917, Shelokhonov was ordered by the Soviet Communist party to portray Lenin in several productions, an order no one could refuse in the Soviet Union. So, Shelokhonov portrayed Lenin in the style of satire, which angered the communists, but made common viewers smile.

=== Moscow ===
In 1967, Petr Shelokhonov made his TV debut in Moscow appearing in the leading role as Unknown Soldier in the TV movie Steps to the Sun (Shagi v Solntse) (Шаги в солнце) which premiered in the USSR on Soviet Central Television in 1967. Successful appearances on television made Petr Shelokhonov known to major film studios and soon he made his big-screen debut in the film titled Hidden Enemy - No Amnesty (1968) appearing as Soviet police officer who was a foreign spy. Petr Shelokhonov played a good-looking spy, who was surreptitiously killing people and infiltrating the Soviet rank and file wearing a Soviet police uniform. The film release coincided with the real attack on the Soviet leader Leonid Brezhnev by an armed man who penetrated the Kremlin wearing a Soviet uniform. Brezhnev's police Chief N.A.Schelokov wrote an angry letter to the Soviet Communist Party demanding that this "anti-Soviet" film must be banned. Immediately the film was banned and Petr Shelokhonov was censored. Then the film was altered and re-made for release later in 1969 under the new film title, "Amnesty Not Possible", but it was also banned and all existing printed copies and the original camera negative were destroyed by the Soviets. The replacement film was produced under the supervision of the Soviet KGB, it was titled Untangling (Развязка) and released in 1970. In it the spy, played again by Petr Shelokhonov, is wearing a white shirt instead of a Soviet uniform, because the Soviet KGB ordered the filmmakers to do so.

In June 1969, the Chief of Soviet State Police (N.A.Shchelokov) wrote:

"The Lenfilm studios completed the movie "Amnesty Not Possible" (directed by N. Rozanov, screenwriter A. Romov), which, in our opinion, contains serious political mistakes. In the role of a foe of the Soviet power, a traitor to the motherland, a resident of foreign intelligence in this film is the chief of the district police department. Such a malicious misinterpretation of the image of a leading officer of the internal affairs can cause deep outrage and distrust among the viewers and may create a distorted image of Soviet law enforcement, by showing their views and beliefs as hostile to the vital interests of the Soviet people and the Communist Party. Our justified outrage is caused not only by the malicious distortion of the image of a Soviet Officer but also by the obvious falsification of reality. In the history of Soviet law enforcement, there was never a case for its commanding officer to become an agent of imperialist intelligence. Attention is drawn to the harmful trend of the film script showing a clash between Soviet Police and the KGB authorities, who exposed the treacherous activity of the police officer. Propaganda of such contrived "conflicts" can damage the authority of both the state security and internal affairs agencies. The film "Amnesty Not Possible" defames the honor and dignity of police officers, contradicts the requirements of the November resolution of the Central Committee of the CPSU and the Council of Ministers of the USSR about the truthful depiction of internal affairs and the all-round strengthening of their authority among the Soviet people. I hereby request your order to ban the release of the film "Amnesty Not Possible". Also, the production of motion pictures about Soviet law enforcement agencies should be better consulted by the Ministry of the Interior of the USSR."

— Letter of the Minister of Internal Affairs of the USSR N.A. Shchelokov to Secretary of the Central Committee of the Communist Party of USSR comrade P.N. Demichev of 13 June 1969.

The Committee on Cinematography considered a letter from the Minister of the Interior of the USSR Comrade Shchelokov N.A. about the film "Amnesty is not possible" produced by the Lenfilm studios. It was decided not to replicate the film, to return all the original materials to the studio. Director of the studio comrade I.N.Kiselev was instructed to make changes to the film, following the concerns expressed in the letter by comrade N.A.Shchelokov.

— Note by the Chairman of the Committee on Cinematography Affairs under the Council of Ministers of the USSR, Alexei Romanov, sent to the Central Committee of the Communist Party of USSR on 3 July 1969.

Censored by the Soviet Government, Petr Shelokhonov experienced hard times. In 1970, he was recommended by film director Sergei Gerasimov for the portrayal of Sergei Korolev, the legendary rocket scientist who launched the first man in space, but state censors refused him the job. The film title was Taming of the Fire (Ukroshcheniye ognya) (Укрощение огня) but Shelokhonov was banned from playing the leading role by Soviet censor. The leading role eventually went to his fellow actor Kirill Lavrov and Shelokhonov played a supporting role having such film partners as Innokenty Smoktunovsky, Igor Gorbachyov, Yevgeni Matveev, Zinovi Gerdt, Igor Vladimirov, Vera Kuznetsova, Andrei Popov and other notable Russian actors.

The film Taming of the Fire revealed for the first time some details of the top-secret Soviet missile program that was developing behind the Iron Curtain. At that time Soviet political censors had total domination over the filmmakers. Filming locations in the Soviet Union were top secret, such as the Baykonur Cosmodrome in Kazakhstan and the Gagarin Space Center near Moscow. Soviet military censors watched the secret equipment and rocket science machinery that was disallowed, so several scenes with good acting were deleted and destroyed. The total length of destroyed footage was well over a thousand meters of film, so the released version of the film was reduced by one hour. Several scenes with performances by Petr Shelokhonov and other actors were also censored and destroyed.

=== Leningrad ===
In 1968, Petr Shelokhonov moved back to Leningrad. There he became a member of the troupe at Lenkom Theatre, then he joined the troupe at Lensovet Theatre, and then became permanent member of the troupe at Komissarjevsky Theatre. During the 1970s, 1980s and 1990s he created a number of leading roles in popular stage productions in Leningrad, such as Nikita Romanovich in trilogy about Russian Tsars: Death of Ivan the Terrible, Tsar Boris, and Tsar Fedor Ioannovich by Aleksei Tolstoy. Petr Shelokhonov was critically acclaimed for his performance in the leading roles as Sudakov in Gnezdo Glukharya by Viktor Rozov, as Dmitri Nikolaevich in Theme and Variations by Aleksei Arbuzov, and as Johansson in Antiquariat by Annie Pukkemaa. His most memorable TV performances were such roles as Laptev in Chekhov's Three Years, as Corporal Vaskov in Dawns are quiet here by Boris Vasilyev, and as Batmanov in Far from Moscow (Daleko ot Moskvy) (Далеко от Москвы) by Vasily Azhaev. At that time Shelokhonov was also cast in films made by Lenfilm Studios, Odessa Film Studio, Kiev Dovzhenko Film Studios, Mosfilm and Sverdlovsk film studios. Petr Shelokhonov shone in a range of leading and supporting roles such as Cossack Severian Ulybin in 1971 epic film Dauriya and as spy Sotnikov in the 1969 detective drama Razvyazka. He also portrayed a variety of historical figures, leaders and intellectuals, on stage and in film, such as the Russian composer Mikhail Glinka, Academician Ivan Sechenov, revolutionaries Lenin and Dorogomilov. In 1974 Shelokhonov played the leading role as industrialist Peresada, opposite another Russian film star Natalia Fateeva, in political drama Countermeasure (Otvetnaya mera) based on real historic events of the Cold War.

=== St. Petersburg ===
In 1989, writer and director Peter Ustinov invited Petr Shelokhonov to play the leading role, as Sam, in his autobiographical play Photo Finish, which was staged and directed by Peter Ustinov in St. Petersburg at the Lensovet Theatre. In that production, Petr Shelokhonov gave a critically acclaimed performance with the support of an ensemble of his stage acting partners, such as Yelena Solovey, Roman Gromadsky, Anna Aleksakhina, and other notable Russian actors. The production ran more than 100 performances spanning three seasons from 1989 to 1992.

In 1993, Petr Shelokhonov directed a stage production of the American play Isabella by Irving A. Leitner, about Jewish girl Isabella Katz Leitner, who survived the Auschwitz concentration camp. The production was made possible by American producers. Petr Shelokhonov created an innovative and life-affirming final scene in which the victims of the Nazis are seen emerging from the burning ovens of Auschwitz. One by one, they slowly walk across the stage to symbolically join the living audience, accompanied by the music from Mozart's Requiem.

In his directing as well as in his acting Petr Shelokhonov used his own experience as a WWII survivor.

In 1996, Petr Shelokhonov was cast by Marion Dougherty to perform opposite Sophie Marceau, James Fox, and Sean Bean in Anna Karenina (1997 film) by director Bernard Rose. The film based on the 1877 novel of the same name by Leo Tolstoy became the only international production filmed entirely in Russia, on locations in Saint Petersburg and Moscow.

== Recognition ==
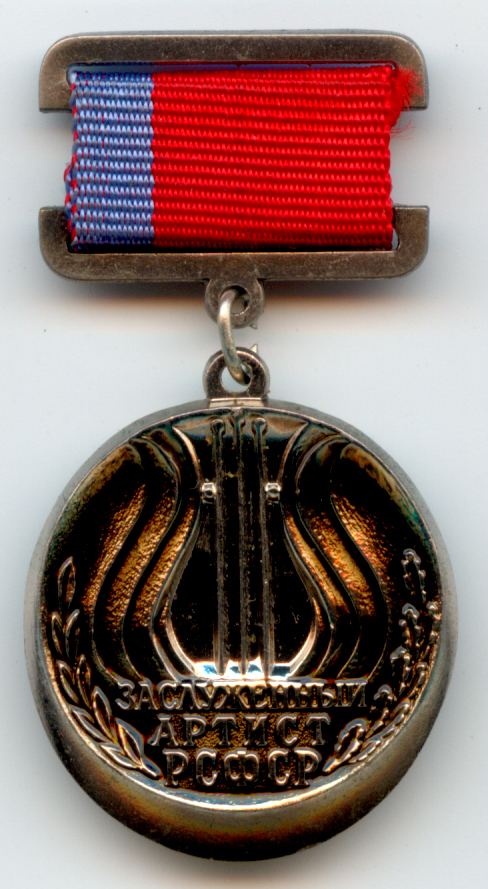
Petr Shelokhonov was designated Honoured Actor of Russia

Petr Shelokhonov was loved by the public, despite hard times with Soviet officials. He played leading and supporting roles in Russian and international films, and his filmography includes over 80 roles in film and on television. His film partners were such actors as Kirill Lavrov, Alisa Freindlich, Yefim Kopelyan, Pavel Luspekayev, Ivan I. Krasko, Igor Gorbachyov, Nikolai Gritsenko, Vitali Solomin, Natalya Fateyeva, Imre Sinkovits, James Fox, Sophie Marceau, Sean Bean, and other notable actors. He also played over 100 roles onstage in Russian and international theater productions and was a member of three theatre companies in Leningrad – St. Petersburg. Petr Shelokhonov received honors from the republic of Latvia (1952) and was designated Honorable Actor of Russia (1979). He died in 1999 and was laid to rest in St. Petersburg, Russia. The book about him is titled "My best friend Petr Shelokhonov" by actor Ivan I. Krasko was published in 2009, to commemorate the 80th anniversary of the actor, and other books about him were published in Russia, in Europe, and in the United States.

== Filmography ==
=== Actor ===
- 1967: Shagi v Solntse (Шаги в солнце) – as Unknown soldier
- 1968: Tri goda by Chekhov (Три года) – as Aleksei Fedorovich Laptev
- 1968: Hidden Enemy (Скрытый враг (фильм, 1968)) - as Soviet police officer
- 1969: Rokirovka v dlinnuyu storonu (Рокировка в длинную сторону) – as Scientist
- 1969: Untangling (Развязка) – as Spy Vladimir Sotnikov
- 1970: Franz Liszt. Dreams of love (Ференц Лист) – as Mikhail Glinka, Russian composer
- 1970: Lyubov Yarovaya (Любовь Яровая) – as Commissare Mazukhin
- 1970: Dawns are quiet here (А зори здесь тихие) – as Sergeant Vaskov
- 1970: Far from Moscow (Daleko ot Moskvy) (Далеко от Москвы) – as Manager Batmanov
- 1971: Night on the 14th Parallel (Ночь на 14-й паралели) – as Newspaper Editor
- 1971: Dauria (Даурия) – as Cossack Severian Ulybin
- 1971: Shutite? (Шутите?) – as Chairman
- 1971: Kholodno – goryacho (Холодно – горячо) – as Writer Anton Podorozhny
- 1972: Taming of the Fire (Укрощение огня) – as Michael Karelin, rocket scientist
- 1972: Grossmeyster (Гроссмейстер) – as Stepfather
- 1972: Such a long, long road (Такая длинная, длинная дорога) – as Captain
- 1973: Opoznanie (Опознание) – as Colonel
- 1974: Amra – as Khasarman, Amra's father
- 1974: Countermeasure (Ответная мера) – as Sergei Ivanovich Peresada
- 1975: You win it in battle (Обретешь в бою) – as Mayor Nikolai Sergeev
- 1975: Troil and Kressida (TV) – as King Agamemnon
- 1976: Menya eto ne kasaetsa (Меня это не касается) – as Detective Pankatov
- 1976: Trust (Доверие) – as Georgiy Pokrovsky
- 1976: Vitali Bianki (Виталий Бианки) – as Presenter-Narrator
- 1977: First joy (Первые радости) – as Dorogomilov
- 1978: Kamyshy (Камыши) – as Detective

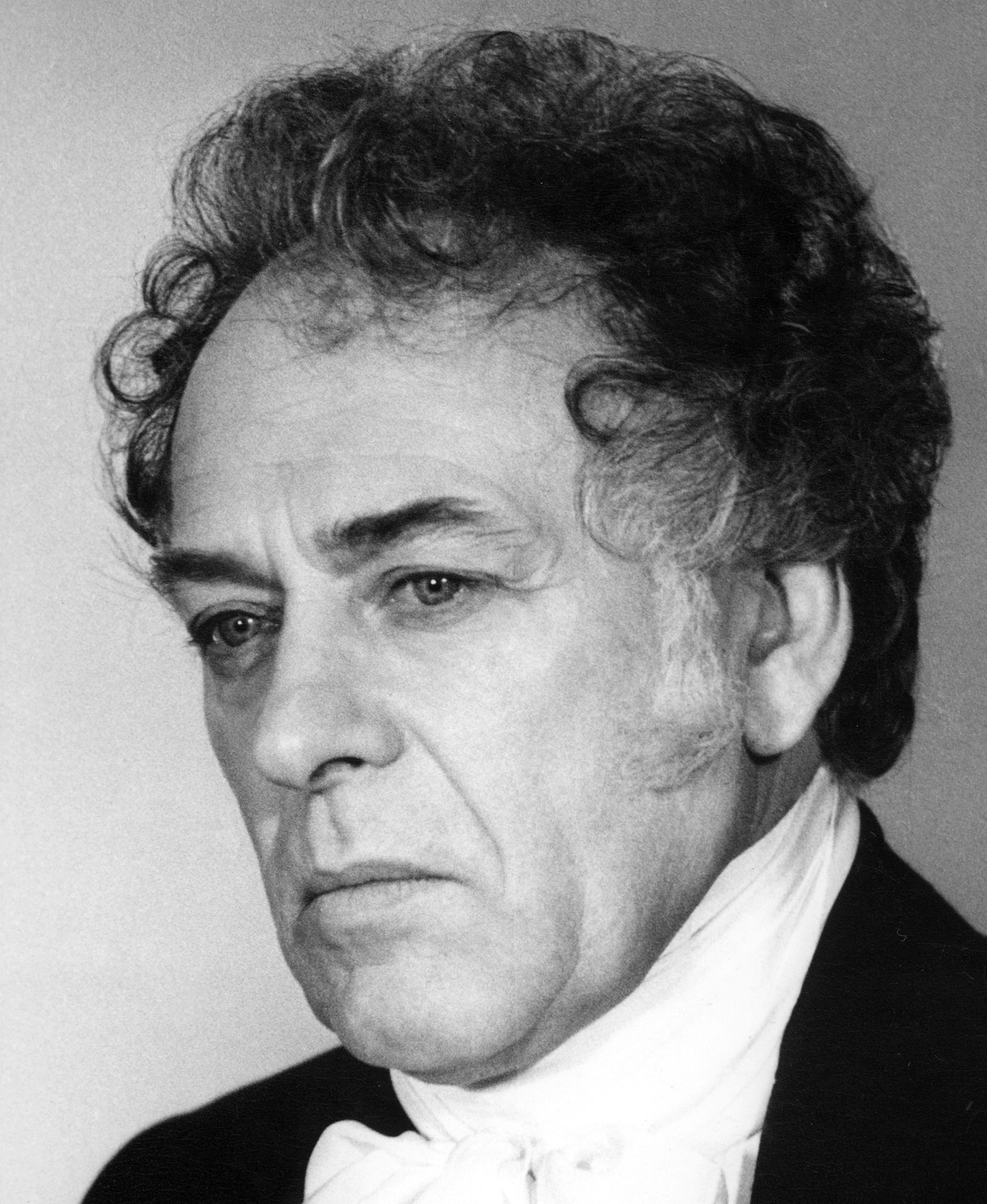
Petr Shelokhonov as Count Vielgorsky in "Liszt Ferenc" (Hungarian TV, 1982)

- 1978: Moment decides everything (Все решает мгновение) – as Matveev, Director of Sport
- 1978: Full Circle (Возвращение на круги своя) – as Professor-psychiatrist Badmayev from St. Petersburg
- 1979: Extraordinary summer (Необыкновенное лето) – as Dorogomilov
- 1979: Puteshestvie v drugoi gorod (Путешествие в другой город) – as Fedor Ignatevich
- 1980: Zhizn i priklyucheniya chetyrekh druzei 1/2 (Жизнь и приключения четырех друзей 1/2) – as Forest ranger
- 1980: Late rendez-vous (Поздние свидания) – as Lena's father
- 1981: Zhizn i priklyucheniya chetyrekh druzei 3/4 (Жизнь и приключения четырех друзей 3/4) – as Forest ranger
- 1981: "Truth of Lieutenant Klimov" (Правда лейтенанта Климова) – as Nikolai Chervonenko
- 1981: 20 December (Двадцатое декабря (фильм)) – as Lawyer Zarudny
- 1981: Devushka i Grand (Девушка и Гранд) – as Director of Sport
- 1981: Syndikate - 2 (Синдикат 2)– as Agent Ivan Fomichev
- 1981: It was beyond the Narva gates – as Revolutionary Gregory
- 1982: Customs (Таможня) – as Chief customs officer
- 1982: Niccolò Paganini (Никколо Паганини) – Voice
- 1982: The year of active sun (Год активного солнца) – as School suprviser
- 1982: Liszt Ferenc (Ференц Лист ТВ) – as Count Mikhail Vielgorsky
- 1982: Golos (Голос) – as Production Director
- 1982: Fifth decade (Пятый десяток (ТВ)) – as Vasili Nikitich
- 1983: Magistral (Магистраль (фильм)) – as Chairman Gadalov
- 1983: Mesto deistviya (Место действия) – as Mayor Ivan Ryabov
- 1984: Zaveshchanie professora Douela (Завещание профессора Доуэля) – Cameo
- 1984: Two versions of one collision (Две версии одного столкновения) – as Diplomat Gordin
- 1985: Sofia Kovalevskaya (Софья Ковалевская) – as Ivan Sechenov
- 1985: Rivals (Соперницы) – as Coach Semenich
- 1985: Kontract of the century (Контракт века) – as Government Minister
- 1985: Rassleduet Brigada Bychkova (Расследует Бригада Бычкова) – Detective Officer
- 1986: The last road (Последняя дорога) – as Doctor Stefanovich
- 1986: "Red arrow" (Красная стрела) – as Manager Yusov
- 1987: Sreda obitaniya (Среда обитания) – as Director of National Archives
- 1987: Vezuchiy chelovek (Везучий человек) – as Manager
- 1987: Moonzund (Моонзунд) – as Captain Andreev
- 1988: "Bread is a proper noun" (Хлеб – имя существительное) – as Blacksmith Akimych
- 1991: "My best friend, General Vasili, son of Joseph Stalin" (Мой лучший друг, генерал Василий, сын Иосифа) – as Colonel Savinykh
- 1992: Richard II(Ричард II) – as Lord Marshal
- 1996: Passazhirka (Пассажирка) – as Passenger
- 1997: Anna Karenina, a 1997 film by Bernard Rose starring Sophie Marceau. (Анна Каренина) – as Kapitonich, Karenin's butler

== Stage works ==
=== Actor ===
- 1997: Passenger (Пассажирка) – as Passenger
- 1994: Barefoot in the Park (Босиком по парку) – as Victor Velasco
- 1993: Antiquariat by fi:Anneli Pukema – as Johansson
- 1992: Murder of Gonzago (Убииство Гонзаго) – as King Gonzago
- 1989: Photo Finish by Peter Ustinov (Фотофиниш) – as Sam
- 1988: The Land of Promise by W. Somerset Maugham – as Mr. Wikham
- 1986: Round table under lamp (Круглый стол под абажуром) – as Slepokhin
- 1985: A Grand Piano in the Sea (Рояль в открытом море)
- 1983: Last Summer in Chulimsk by Alexander Vampilov (Прошлым летом в Чулимске) – as Pomigalov
- 1980: Fifth decade (Пятый десяток) – as Fedor Nikitich
- 1980: Theme and Variations (Тема с вариациями) – as Dmitri Nikolaevich
- 1978: Gnezdo glukharia (Гнездо глухаря) – as Sudakov
- 1977: Tsar Boris (Царь Борис) – as Mitropolite Job
- 1976: Tsar Fédor Ivanovitch (Царь Фёдор Иоаннович) – as Prince Golitsyn
- 1974: Death of Ivan the Terrible (Смерть Иоанна Грозного) – as Nikita Romanovich Zakharin-Yuriev
- 1970: Far from Moscow (aka.. Daleko ot Moskvy) (Далеко от Москвы) – as Batmanov
- 1970: Dawns are quiet here (А зори здесь тихие) – as Sergeant Vaskov
- 1969: Cyrano de Bergerac (Сирано де Бержерак) – as Montfleury, Jodelet
- 1967: In the name of Revolution (Именем революции) – as Lenin
- 1967: Lecture by Lenin (Ленинские чтения) – as Lenin
- 1967: The Cherry Orchard (Вишнёвый сад) – as Gayev, as Lopakhin
- 1967: Three Sisters (Три сестры) – as Tuzenbach
- 1966: Platonov (Платонов) – as Michael Platonov
- 1966: The night of Moon eclipse – as Dervish Divana
- 1966: The Seagull (Чайка) – as Treplev
- 1965: Obelisque – as Peter
- 1965: Ivanov (Иванов) – as Ivanov
- 1964: Uncle Vania (Дядя Ваня) – as Uncle Vanya
- 1964: "104 pages about love" (104 страницы про любовь)
- 1964: Grave accusation (Тяжкое обвинение – Male lead
- 1963: The Lower Depths (На дне) – as Satin
- 1963: Armoured train 14–69 (Бронепоезд 14–69) – as Vaska Pepel
- 1963: Friends and Years (Друзья и годы) – as Derzhavin
- 1963: Ocean (Океан) – as Captain Platonov
- 1962: Ocean (Океан) – as Captain Chasovnikov
- 1961: Golden Boy (Золотой мальчик) – as Joe Bonaparte, the Golden Boy
- 1961: Credit with Nibelungen (Кредит у Нибелунгов)
- 1960: An Irkutsk story (Иркутская история) – as Victor, as Denis
- 1960: Dubrovsky (Дубровский) – as Dubrovsky
- 1959: A little student (Маленькая Студентка) – as Larisov
- 1958: Hamlet (Гамлет) – as Hamlet
- 1957: Poem of bread (Поэма o Хлебе) – as Senya

=== Director of theatre ===
- 1993 – Isabella (Изабелла) (play by Irving A. Leitner)
- 1968 – Platonov (Платонов) (play by A. Chekhov)
- 1967 – Lectures of Lenin (play by M. Shatrov)
- 1967 – Girls from the street of hope (play by A. Mamlin)
- 1966 – Obelisque (play by A. Mamlin)
- 1965 – Ivanov (Иванов) (play by A. Chekhov)
- 1965 – Shadowboxing (play by B. Tour)
- 1964 - 104 pages about love (104 страницы про любовь) (play by Edvard Radzinsky)
- 1964 – Sacred night (play by A. Chavrin)
- 1963 – Friends and years (play by L. Zorin)

== Honors ==
- 1979: Honorable Actor of Russia SFSR (Заслуженный артист РСФСР)
- 1952: Honorary Letter from the Government of Latvia for outstanding performance on stage.

== Sources ==
- Cast Photographs for Anna Karenina (1997 film): , , ,
- Book "My best friend Petr Shelokhonov" (2009, Russian) by actor Ivan I. Krasko – Saint Petersburg, Russia: SOLO Publishing, 2009. ISBN 978-5-904666-09-5
- Biography of Petr Shelokhonov (Russian) by film critic Dmitri Ivaneev
- Lenfilm Studios personal file on film actor Peter Shelokhonov.
- Petr Shelokhonov at the IMDb:
- Petr Shelokhonov (Russian Encyclopedia: Петр Шелохонов)
- Petr Shelokhonov (Russian: Петр Шелохонов)
- Petr Shelokhonov (Russian: Петр Шелохонов) in Russian source: Stranitsy russkoĭ literatury serediny deviatnadtsatogo veka By M. L. Semanova, Page 172
- Publications in THEATER magazine 1961–1996
- Publications in TEATRALHAYA ZHIZN magazine 1959–1994
- Publications in SOVETSKY EKRAN magazine 1969–1992
- Petr Shelokhonov's father (Russian: И. Шелохонов) in Russian source: Page 22 in Kooperativno-kolkhoznoe stroitelʹstvo v Belorusskoĭ SSR, 1917–1927 gg ... By Mikhail Pavlovich. Published by "Nauka i tekhnika" 1980
