= Life and Adventures of Four Friends 3/4 =

Zhizn i priklyucheniya chetyrekh druzei 3/4
- Жизнь и приключения четырех друзей 3/4
- Directed by: Oleg Yeryshev
- Written by: Yusef Printsev
- Starring: Katya Kishmereshkina; Petr Shelokhonov; Boris Sokolov; Mikhail Svetin; Yefim Kamenetsky; Lev Lemke
- Cinematography: Roman Chernyak
- Edited by: G. Saidakovskaya
- Music by: Gennady Gladkov; Igor Tsvetkov
- Distributed by: Ochakovo Film (Russia); Enio Film
- Release date: 1981
- Running time: 60 minutes
- Country: Soviet Union
- Language: Russian

'Zhizn i priklyucheniya chetyrekh druzei 3/4 (English: Life and Adventures of Four Friends 3/4) (Russian: Жизнь и приключения четырех друзей 3/4) is a 1981 Soviet children's movie. It is a sequel to Life and Adventures of Four Friends 1/2 (film), set in Russia. Adapted from the story of the same name by Yusef Printsev and directed by Oleg Yeryshev. This is a second film in the popular family series about the adventures of three dogs and one cat, who are following their owner and are having much fun together. Film runs 60 minutes, and has two parts: 3. Igra s ognyom (aka.. Playing games with fire), and 4. Kot v meshke (aka.. Cat in the bag).

== Plot ==
Dogs and cat are together again. Three dogs and one cat are now good friends and they continue their adventures while they are following their owner, a forest ranger (played by Petr Shelokhonov). This time the cat becomes the leader of the four friends. Cat Svetofor together with three dogs: Bubrik, Fram, and Toshka are going on a winter journey, they follow their owner on an airplane flying North. The four animals travel to a nursery where New Year trees are grown. There four animals help people to stop the fire and save New Year trees. Then, together with their owner, the four friends join children for celebration of the New Year.

== Production ==
- Filming dates 1980 - 1981
- Filming locations: Lentelefilm studios, Leningrad, Leningrad Oblast, Russia.
- Five additional animal tamers took part in filming.
- Three dogs and one cat were selected for filming after auditioning hundreds of dogs and cats with their owners.
- Dogs and cat "improvised" a lot before the camera, so many takes were made for each scene before getting good results for congruent editing.
- Dogs and cat made some unexpected moves during the filming, so the writer, Yusef Printsev, had to create additional lines for human actors and for translator of the animals' thoughts (Lev Lemke).

== Release ==
- The film was released in 1981, on the Moscow Central Television, as well as in theatres in Leningrad, Moscow, and across Russia, as a sequel to Zhizn i priklyucheniya chetyrekh druzei 1/2. Both films also ran in theatres across the former Soviet Union and in Eastern Europe. In 1994 the film was re-edited in St. Petersburg, Russia for video release. That same year the film was released on VHS and DVD, having several editions during the 1990s, and has been a popular family entertainment for all ages.
- The film and its prequel were also released in Germany in the 2000s (decade) under the title "Die Abenteuer der vier Strolche (1/2)" and the sequel "Die Abenteuer der vier Strolche (3/4)."
- This film is the second in a series of 8 episodes made between 1980 and 1994. Each episode has a different plot and variations in the cast of actors and crew, but with the same three dogs remaining in the first 4 episodes. The first 4 episodes are paired (1/2 and 3/4) and edited as two movies for video release, now available on VHS and DVD in Europe and in the countries of the former USSR. It remains a popular family movie for all ages.

== Interesting facts ==
- This is a second film in the popular Russian children's series about three dogs and a cat becoming friends. In real life, three dogs, named Toshka, Bubrik and Fram, and a cat Svetofor became really friendly and cooperative with actors and director in the course of filming. Owners of dogs and cat also became extras in the film.
- Cat Vaska was too independent, and eventually walked away from the project. New cat, named Barsik, was cast as "Cat Svetofor" and remained in the cast for parts 3 and 4.

== Main cast ==
- Katya Kishmereshkina
- Petr Shelokhonov
- Tatyana Samarina
- Boris Sokolov
- Mikhail Svetin
- Yefim Kamenetsky
- Lev Lemke - as Translator of animals' thoughts.
- Vladimir Bobin
- Valeri Bychenkov
- Valeri Doronin
- Andrei Khilko
- Mikhail Matveyev
- Yevgeni Tilicheyev
- Nikita Yeryshev

== Animal actors ==
- Cat Svetofor - played by cat Barsik (no owner mentioned)
- Dog Bubrik - played by terriere Chingiz (dog owner - E. Sokolova)
- Dog Fram - played by shepherd Yanko (dog owner - L. Ostretsova)
- Dog Toshka - as herself (dog owner - S. Pavlova)

== Crew ==
- Director: Oleg Yeryshev
- Production director: Yu. Goncharov
- Writers: Yusef Printsev, Oleg Yeryshev
- Cinematographers: Roman Chernyak, V. Ivanets
- Composers: Gennady Gladkov, Igor Tsvetkov
- Art director: Konstantin Dmitrakov
- Editing: G. Saidakovskaya, L. Burtsova
- Second unit director: A. Ratnikov
- Sound: Iosif Minkov
- Music editor: A. Aristov
- Light: A. Zakharov, L. Yudina
- Animal trainers: L. Ostretsova, S. Pavlova, E. Sokolova.
- Production managers: E. Grigorenko, O. Krakhovskaya, E. Snyatovskaya

== Production companies ==
- Gosteleradio
- Lentelefilm
- Ochakovo-Films

== Distributors ==
- Gosteleradio (all formats, from 1981–1991) in the Soviet Union.
- Ochakovo-Films (all formats, after 1992) in Russia.
- Enio Film (after 1994, VHS video) (non-Russia, non-USA).
