= Andromeda nebula =

Andromeda nebula may refer to:

- Andromeda Galaxy, a spiral galaxy in the constellation Andromeda
- Andromeda: A Space-Age Tale, originally The Andromeda Nebula, a 1957 science fiction novel by Ivan Efremov
  - The Andromeda Nebula, a 1967 Soviet film based on the above novel
