= Eleven Hopes =

- Russian: Одиннадцать надежд
- Directed by: Viktor Sadovsky
- Written by: Valentin Yezhov; Viktor Sadovsky
- Produced by: Aleksandr Boyarinov
- Starring: Anatoly Papanov; Lyubov Virolaynen; Yuriy Demich; Aleksandr Goloborodko; Igor Dobryakov
- Cinematography: Vladimir Kovzel
- Edited by: Yevgeniya Shkultina
- Music by: Vladlen Chistyakov
- Production company: Lenfilm
- Release date: 1975
- Running time: 101 minutes
- Country: Soviet Union
- Language: Russian

Eleven Hopes (Russian: Одиннадцать надежд, romanized: Odinnadtsat nadezhd) is a 1975 Soviet sports comedy film directed by Viktor Sadovsky.

The film tells about the creation of a football team and her preparation for the World Cup.

== Plot ==
Following a recent failure by the USSR national football team in international competitions, the Soviet Football Federation appoints seasoned coach Vasily Vorontsov as head coach to prepare the team for the World Cup qualifiers. Vorontsov agrees, with the condition that he can select players independently. He travels across the country to scout talent, selecting veteran defender Boris Lavryonov, promising young player Konstantin Kosichkin, and a top second-league striker, Vladimir Babochkin, known for his loyalty to his club despite offers from top-league teams. Meanwhile, in Leningrad, team candidate Sergey Romantsev suffers a severe injury. Instead of heading to a local hospital, he insists on traveling to Moscow to see Dr. Mironova at the trauma institute, only to find she’s abroad. Instead, a young surgeon, Irina Lozovskaya, performs his operation and, after his recovery, joins the team as a physician at Vorontsov’s request.

As the team begins intensive training, Vorontsov helps players navigate personal issues and form a cohesive unit. The challenges culminate when starting goalkeeper Viktor Parkhomenko breaks team protocol and nearly misses a critical warm-up match. Following a sincere conversation, he’s allowed to stay as a substitute. The team then faces its deciding qualifier against Spain, a game shrouded in pressure, with the Spanish hosts arranging an intimidating visit to a bullfight and fans creating an intense atmosphere. The game proves fiercely competitive, with the USSR team forced to defend against Spain’s relentless offense. Despite setbacks, including Romantsev’s injury and the Spanish team’s aggressive tactics, Romantsev returns to the field in the final moments, setting up Kosichkin for a game-tying goal. With the draw, the USSR team achieves a hard-won success, celebrating their journey toward the World Cup.

== Cast ==
- Anatoly Papanov as Vorontsov
- Lyubov Virolaynen as Lozovskaya
- Yuriy Demich as Romantsev
- Aleksandr Goloborodko as Lavrenyov
- Igor Dobryakov as Sokolovsky
- Nikolai Sektimenko as Parkhomenko
- Boris Shcherbakov as Babochkin
- Yevgeny Leonov-Gladyshev as Kosichkin
- Nikolai Ozerov as Commentator
- Igor Gorbachyov as Nikolai Ivanovich
