= Grigory Chukhray =

Soviet film director and screenwriter (1921–2001)

- Григорий Чухрай
- Born: 23 May 1921; Melitopol, Ukrainian SSR
- Died: 28 October 2001 (aged 80); Moscow, Russia
- Resting place: Vagankovo Cemetery, Moscow
- Occupations: Film director, screenwriter
- Years active: 1956–1984
- Notable work: The Forty-First (1956); Ballad of a Soldier (1959); Clear Skies (1961)
- Title: People's Artist of the USSR (1981)
- Spouse: Irina
- Children: 2, including Pavel Chukhray
- Awards: Lenin Prize (1961); BAFTA (1961)

Grigory Naumovich Chukhray (Note: Russian: Григорий Наумович Чухрай, romanized: Grigory Naumovich Chukhray; Ukrainian: Григорій Наумович Чухрай, romanized: Hryhorii Naumovych Chukhrai) (23 May 1921 – 28 October 2001) was a Soviet film director and screenwriter of Ukrainian origin. For his body of work, which included the film Ballad of a Soldier (1959), he was awarded the honorary title People's Artist of the USSR in 1981.

== Early life ==
Grigory Chukhray was born in Melitopol (modern-day Zaporizhzhia Oblast of Ukraine) to Red Army soldiers Naum Zinovievich Rubanov and Claudia Petrovna Chukhray. He was of Ukrainian origin. His parents divorced when he was three years old. He was raised by a stepfather, Pavel Antonovich Litvinenko, the head of a kolkhoz. His mother Claudia Chukhray took an active part in the collectivization and dekulakization of the Ukrainian SSR, then worked as an investigation officer at militsiya.

In 1939, Chukhray was drafted into the military where he became a decorated World War II veteran. His wartime experiences profoundly affected him and the majority of his films. He served in the 229th communications battalion of the 134th Infantry Division (later part of the 19th Army). He fought at the Southern, Stalingrad and Don Fronts. From 1943 on, he served in airborne troops at the 1st, 2nd and 3rd Ukrainian Fronts and took part in operation "Dnipro Troopers". He was wounded three times. In 1944, he joined the Communist Party.

== Career ==
At war's end, Chukhray studied filmmaking at VGIK, the course led by Sergei Yutkevich and Mikhail Romm, and then developed his skills as a director's assistant at the Kiev Film Studio. By the mid-1950s, he began writing and directing his own films at the Mosfilm studio, gaining cinematic recognition outside the Soviet Union at the 1957 Cannes Film Festival with his film The Forty-First (1956).

Chukhray directed and co-wrote Ballad of a Soldier (1959). Centered on the themes of love and the tragedy of war, the film received acclaim at home, earning the Lenin Prize. It was heralded internationally for both its story and cinematic technique. At the 1960 Cannes Film Festival it was awarded a special jury prize for "high humanism and outstanding quality." Ballad of a Soldier premiered in the United States in 1960 at the San Francisco International Film Festival. The film won the Festival's Golden Gate Award for Best Picture as well as a Best Director for Chukhray. Playing worldwide, the following year it earned the BAFTA Award for Best Film. Chukhray and script co-writer Valentin Yezhov were also nominated for the 1961 Academy Award for Best Original Screenplay.

Chukhray's next film was Clear Skies (1961). It tells of a Soviet pilot who survives Nazi imprisonment during WWII, but then is accused back home of spying. It was one of the first Soviet films to deal with repressive practices under the leadership of Joseph Stalin. It won the Grand Prix (in a tie with Kaneto Shindo's The Naked Island) at the 2nd Moscow International Film Festival. Two years later Chukhray served as the president of the jury at the 3rd Moscow International Film Festival.

Between 1966 and 1971, Chukhray headed the director's courses at VGIK. In 1965, he founded and led the Experimental Studio at Mosfilm that produced such films as White Sun of the Desert (1970), The Twelve Chairs (1971), Ivan Vasilievich: Back to the Future (1973), A Slave of Love (1976), and other popular movies. He also served as a member of the State Committee for Cinematography between 1964 and 1991.

In 1984, Chukhray directed his final Soviet film, together with Yuri Shvyryov: I'll Teach You to Dream. In 1992–1993, he and Rolf Schübel co-directed Todfeinde. Vom Sterben und Überleben in Stalingrad, a joint Russian-Germany documentary in two parts about the Battle of Stalingrad. In the film's interviews, Chukhray along with other Russian and German survivors told of their experiences during the battle.

In 1981, Chukhray was given the honorary title, People's Artist of the USSR. In 1994 he received a Nika Award for his lifetime contribution to cinema. In 2001 he published two volumes of memoirs, My War and My Cinema, detailing his war experiences and his work in cinema, respectively.

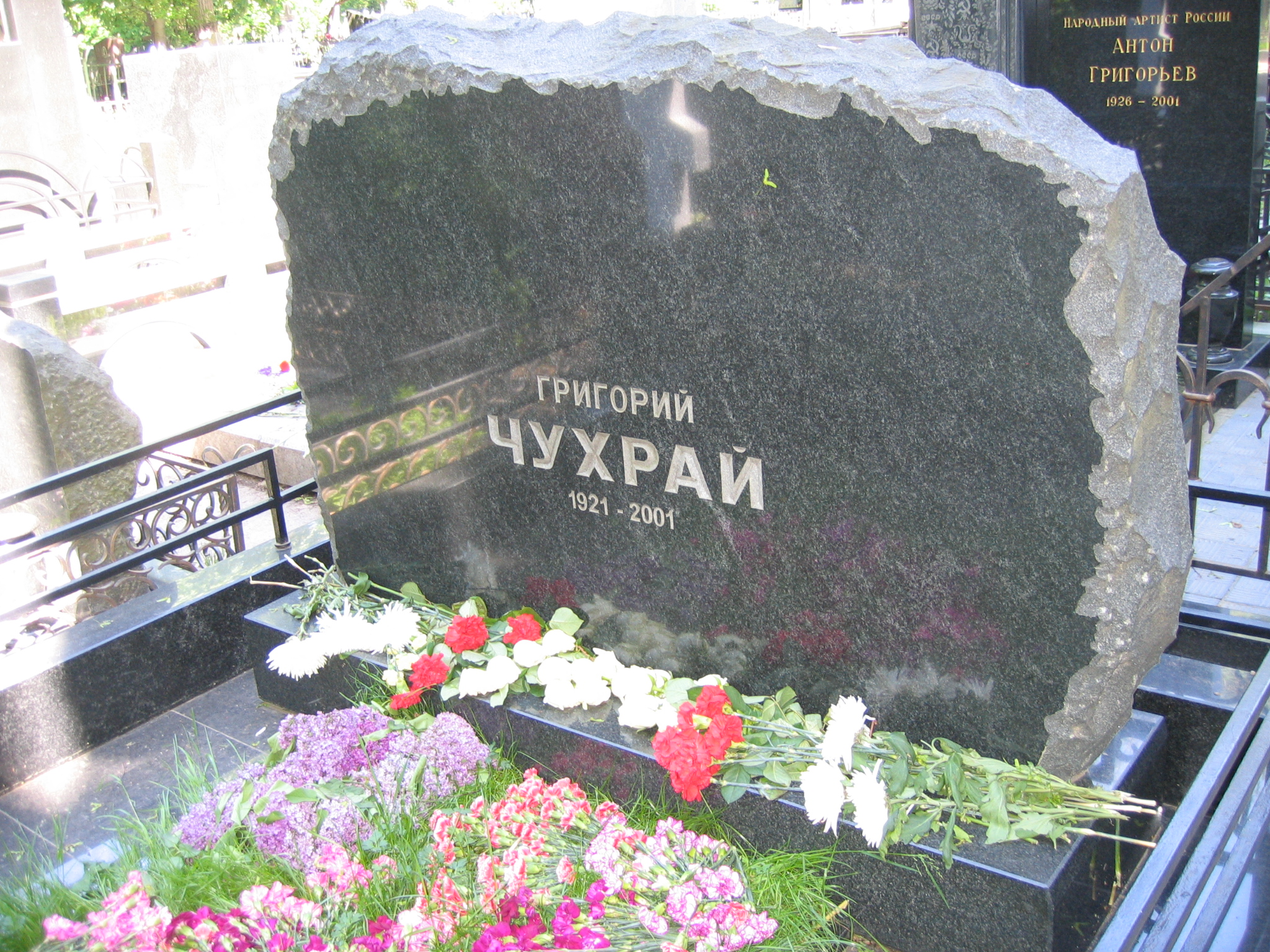
Grigory Chukhray's grave at Vagankovo Cemetery

He was married to Iraida Chukhray (née Penkova), a teacher of Russian language and literature. They had two children: Pavel Chukhray (born 1946) who went on to a prominent career as a screenwriter and film director, and Elena Chukhray (born 1961) who became an expert in film studies.

Grigory Chukhray died of heart failure in Moscow in 2001 at the age of eighty. He was buried at the Vagankovo Cemetery in Moscow.

== Awards and honors ==
- Medal "For the Defence of Stalingrad" (1943)
- Order of the Red Star (1944)
- Medal "For the Capture of Vienna" (1945)
- Medal "For the Victory over Germany in the Great Patriotic War 1941–1945" (1945)
- Order of the Patriotic War, 2nd class (1945)
- Lenin Prize (1961)
- Honored Art Worker of the RSFSR (1962)
- Jubilee Medal "Twenty Years of Victory in the Great Patriotic War 1941–1945" (1965)
- People's Artist of the RSFSR (1969)
- Jubilee Medal "In Commemoration of the 100th Anniversary of the Birth of Vladimir Ilyich Lenin" (1970)
- Jubilee Medal "Thirty Years of Victory in the Great Patriotic War 1941–1945" (1975)
- People's Artist of the USSR (1981)
- Order of the Patriotic War, 1st class (1985)
- Nika Award for the Lifetime Achievement Award (1994)
- Order "For Merit to the Fatherland", 4th class (1996)
- Three Orders of the Red Banner of Labour

== Filmography ==
Year	English Title	Original Title	Notes
1956	The Forty-First	Сорок первый	Director; debut film
1959	Ballad of a Soldier	Баллада о солдате	Director; screenwriter
1961	Clear Skies	Чистое небо	Director
1965	There Was an Old Couple	Жили-были старик со старухой	Director
1966	People!	Люди!	Director
1971	Memory	Память	Director; documentary
1978	Untypical Story	Трясина	Director; screenwriter
1979	Life Is Beautiful	Жизнь прекрасна	Director; screenwriter
1984	I'll Teach You to Dream	Я научу вас мечтать	Co-director with Yuri Shvyryov; documentary

== See also ==
- List of Russian Academy Award winners and nominees
