= A Winter Morning =

- Russian: Зимнее утро
- Directed by: Nikolay Lebedev
- Written by: Sokrat Kara
- Produced by: I. Shorokhov
- Starring: Tanya Soldatenkova; Konstantin Kornakov; Nikolai Timofeyev; Vera Kuznetsova; Liliya Gurova; Fyodor Nikitin
- Cinematography: Semyon Ivanov
- Music by: Vladimir Maklakov
- Production company: Lenfilm
- Release date: January 9, 1967
- Running time: 90 min.
- Country: Soviet Union
- Language: Russian

A Winter Morning (Russian: Зимнее утро, romanized: Zimnee utro) is a 1967 Soviet war drama film directed by Nikolay Lebedev. Based on the novel by Tamara Zinberg.

== Plot ==
The film tells about a girl named Katya, who rescues a little boy during the bombing and decides to take him under her care in Siege of Leningrad. Suddenly, Captain Voronov, in search of his family, meets them, recognizes his son and adopts Katya.

== Cast ==
- Tanya Soldatenkova as Katya
- Konstantin Kornakov as Sergei
- Nikolai Timofeyev as Alexey Petrovich Voronov
- Vera Kuznetsova as aunt Tanya
- Liliya Gurova as Nina Voronova
- Fyodor Nikitin as Professor
- Yevgeny Grigoryev as house manager Ivan Lukich
