= My Best Friend, General Vasili, Son of Joseph Stalin =

My Best Friend, General Vasili, the Son of Joseph Stalin
- Russian: Moy luchshiy drug, general Vasiliy, syn Iosifa
- Directed by: Viktor Sadovsky
- Written by: Valentin Yezhov
- Starring: Boris Shcherbakov; Vladimir Steklov; Andrei Boltnev; Irina Malysheva; Andrei Tolubeyev; Petr Shelokhonov; Igor Gorbachyov; Georgi Shtil
- Cinematography: Vadim Grammatikov
- Edited by: Galina Baranova
- Music by: Vladlen Chistyakov
- Production companies: Lenfilm; Leninterfilm; Kraun
- Distributed by: Lenfilm (Soviet Union); Leninterfilm; Kraun (Belgium)
- Release date: 1991
- Running time: 102 minutes
- Countries: Soviet Union; Belgium
- Languages: English; Russian
- Budget: $15 000 000

My Best Friend, General Vasili, the Son of Joseph Stalin (Russian: Мой лучший друг генерал Василий, сын Иосифа, romanized: Moy luchshiy drug, general Vasiliy, syn Iosifa) is a 1991 political history drama film, directed by Viktor Sadovsky and starring Boris Shcherbakov and Vladimir Steklov.

== Plot ==
Biopic film set in the 1940s and 1950s Soviet Union, based on a true story of friendship between Vasili Stalin, the son of the Soviet dictator Joseph Stalin, and the famous Soviet sports star Vsevolod Bobrov.

Vasili Stalin was Lieut. General of the Red Army in charge of the Army and Airforce football and ice hockey teams. He befriended the talented athlete Bagrov (Bobrov) and made him a sports star in the Soviet Union. After each game played by his "toy-star" Bobrov, General Vasili Stalin would throw massive and wild drinking parties, with women dancing on their dining table among bottles of vodka. Nobody dared to criticize Vasili Stalin for his wild and manipulative behavior. At the same time, Vasili Stalin was secretly followed and watched by Soviet secret service and his wild behavior was reported to dastardly NKVD chief Lavrenti Beria who cautiously pretended to be Stalin's best friend. But after the death of his father, general Vasili Stalin was arrested by the new Soviet leadership, and was charged with "anti-Soviet" conspiracy. Gen. Vasili Stalin in conversations with foreign diplomats in Moscow expressed his strong criticism of the new Soviet leaders who came to power after the death of his father, Joseph Stalin. Vasili Stalin was demoted and expelled from Moscow to exile in Kazan where he was tightly watched by the secret service and continued drinking himself to death at age 40. Even after the death of Gen. Vasili Stalin, sports star Bagrov still remembered him with gloomy fear.

== Cast ==
=== Main characters ===
- Boris Shcherbakov as Vsevolod Bagrov (Vsevolod Bobrov)
- Vladimir Steklov as Vasili Josifovich Stalin
- Andrei Boltnev as Astafiev
- Irina Malysheva as Ninel
- Andrei Tolubeyev as Tolik (Vladimir Dyomin)
- Petr Shelokhonov as Colonel Savinykh
- Igor Gorbachyov as doctor
- Yan Yanakiev as Lavrentiy Beria
- Valentina Kovel as neighbour
- Igor Yefimov as General
- Georgi Shtil as Colonel

== Production ==
- Production companies: Lenfilm, Leninterfilm, Kraun (Belgium)
- Production dates: 1990 - 1991
- Filming locations: St. Petersburg, Russia, Moscow, Russia.
- Additional production assistance was received from the Red Army and the Central Archives of the USSR.
- Original period military uniforms of the Red Army were used in the film production.
- Vintage Soviet cars of the 1940s and 1950s period were used in the film production.

== Release ==
- Theatrical release in Russia was in 1991
- Theatrical release outside of Russia was in 1992
- Video release was in 1993

== Reception ==
- Estimated theatrical viewership in the former Soviet Union was about 10 million.

== Facts of film production ==
- The treatment for the film script was initially written by Valentin Ezhov in the 1980s, but he was waiting for the right time and circumstances together with director Viktor Sadovsky. The final script was written by the group of four authors.
- Filmmakers changed the name of the main character to Bagrov, in order to avoid direct mentioning of the reputable Russian star Vsevolod Bobrov, whose popularity was high among sport fans in Russia, as well as internationally.
- At the time of filming the former Soviet censorship was practically obsolete because of "perestroyka" and "glasnost" under Mikhail Gorbachev.
- Absence of the Soviet censorship allowed to portray Stalin's son, Vasili Stalin, giving some artistic freedom to filmmakers, and also allowing Russian actresses to be involved in nudity and sex scenes, which were less than usual in the Soviet cinema before 1991.

== Facts of history ==
- Vasili Stalin was the second and youngest son of Joseph Stalin.
- In real life Vasili Iosifovich Stalin was imprisoned under a fictitious name "Vasili Vasilyev" in the Vladimir central prison. He was temporarily released under Nikita Khrushchev and returned to Moscow, but then was arrested again and exiled to the city of Kazan, where he died aged 40, in 1962.
- Vsevolod Bobrov excelled in both football (soccer) and ice hockey, and led the Soviet ice hockey team to victory in the 1956 Winter Olympic Games in Cortina d'Ampezzo, Italy, earning himself an Olympic Gold Medal.
