= Valentin Yezhov =

Soviet and Russian screenwriter

- Валентин Ежов
- Born: Valentin Ivanovich Yezhov; 21 January 1921; Samara, Russian SFSR
- Died: 8 May 2004 (aged 83); Moscow, Russia
- Occupation: Screenwriter
- Years active: 1953—2000
- Spouse(s): Olga Yezhova (1951—1971); Victoria Fyodorova (1972—1973); Natalia Gotovtseva (1973—2004)

Valentin Ivanovich Yezhov (Russian: Валентин Иванович Ежов; 21 January 1921 — 8 May 2004) was a Soviet and Russian screenwriter, playwright, writer and professor at VGIK.

== Early years ==
Valentin Yezhov was born in Samara, Russian SFSR into a Russian family. His father Ivan Vasilyevich Yezhov came from the Belye Kolodezi village (now Ozyorsky District, Moscow Oblast). As a Red Army soldier he took part in battles against the Czechoslovak Legion and was heavily wounded in action. While in a hospital he met Anna Ivanovna Maskalina, a senior nurse who later became his wife. Valentin was a premature child born after seven months of pregnancy. He was named after the character of the Faust opera that made a lasting impression on his parents.

In six years the family moved to the town of Ozyory and then — to Moscow. In 1938 Yezhov graduated from school and joined the army. Shortly before the Great Patriotic War he enrolled into the School for Junior Airmen (known simply as ShMAS), then fought at the Russian Far East as part of the naval aviation forces. He demobilized in 1945 and returned to Moscow where he entered VGIK to study screenwriting under Joseph Manevich. Alexander Dovzhenko took his place later on; it was Dovzhenko's only screenwriting course.

== Career ==
Yezhov started working in cinema in 1953 and quickly turned into one of the most prolific screenwriters of the Soviet Union. He wrote and co-wrote over 50 screenplays, both for short and feature films. He worked in almost every genre, including documentaries. 1959 saw the release of the war drama Ballad of a Soldier directed by Grigory Chukhray. The screenplay was co-written by Chukhray and Yezhov, both war veterans. The film gained a lot of praise and gathered a handful of international awards, including the Special jury prize at the 1960 Cannes Film Festival, the 1961 BAFTA Award for Best Film and the 1961 Bodil Award for Best Non-American Film. It was also nominated for the 1961 Academy Award for Best Original Screenplay. Both Yezhov and Chukrai were awarded a Lenin Prize for their work.

The following years Yezhov worked with such acclaimed directors as Georgiy Daneliya, Larisa Shepitko and Andrei Konchalovsky. Along with Rustam Ibragimbekov he co-wrote a screenplay that was later made into a 1970 Ostern movie White Sun of the Desert by Vladimir Motyl. It turned into one of the box office leaders with 34.5 million viewers and quickly gained a cult status despite lacking any awards or attention from critics. It became a good tradition for Russian cosmonauts to watch the film before the space flights. In 1998 it was awarded the State Prize of the Russian Federation by Boris Yeltsin as a culturally significant piece of art.

In 1978 an epic historical drama Siberiade was produced by Andrei Konchalovsky based on the screenplay written by him and Yezhov. The movie was shown at the 1979 Cannes Film Festival where it received a lot of praise and eventually won the Grand Prix award. It became Konchalovsky's most recognizable work ever since and opened him gates to Hollywood where he fled in just a year after the ceremony.

In addition to his screenwriting career, Yezhov also wrote several theatrical plays (Nightingale Night, Alyosha, Gunfire Beyond the Dunes), worked as a professor and educator at VGIK. Among his students where Valentin Chernykh who produced the screenplay for the Oscar-winning movie Moscow Does Not Believe in Tears and Sergei Bodrov. Member of the Communist Party of the Soviet Union since 1951.

In later years Yezhov worked with Sergei Bondarchuk on the Red Bells dilogy, Ion Popescu-Gopo on the sequel to his Maria, Mirabela fairy tale and other Soviet and foreign film directors. He produced a total of six films together with a film director Viktor Sadovsky, including the 1991 biographical drama My Best Friend, General Vasili, Son of Joseph Stalin about the acclaimed Soviet sportsman Vsevolod Bobrov and his friendship with Vasily Stalin.

After the dissolution of the Soviet Union he turned to screenwriting only once, in the 2000 short film Dr. Andersen that went unnoticed. In 1993 Yezhov and Rustam Ibragimbekov published a novelization of their White Sun of the Desert screenplay. In 2001 they also published a prequel — White Sun of the Desert. Full Version which they hoped to make into a movie or TV series, but apparently this never happened despite the efforts made by Ibragimbekov after his friend's death.

Valentin Yezhov died in Moscow on May 8, 2004. He was buried at the Troyekurovskoye Cemetery. He was survived by his third wife, a writer Natalia Vsevolodovna Gotovtseva. Between 1972 and 1973 he was briefly married to the Soviet and later American actress Victoria Fyodorova who left Russia shortly after their divorce.

== Filmography ==
- World Champion (1954)
- Lyana (1955)
- Ballad of a Soldier (1959)
- Thirty Three (1965)
- Wings (1966)
- A Nest of Gentry (1969)
- White Sun of the Desert (1970)
- That Sweet Word: Liberty! (1972)
- Eleven Hopes (1975)
- Siberiade (1978)
- Little Alexander (1981)
- Red Bells (1982)
- Red Bells II (1982)
- Moon Rainbow (1983)
- Ajooba (1990)
- Tsar Ivan the Terrible (1991)
- My Best Friend, General Vasili, Son of Joseph Stalin (1991)

== See also ==
- List of Russian Academy Award winners and nominees
