= She with a Broom, He in a Black Hat =

- Directed by: Vitaly Makarov
- Written by: Nina Fomina
- Starring: Mikhail Svetin; Nina Ruslanova
- Cinematography: Sergei Zhurbitsky
- Edited by: Lyudmila Drozdova
- Music by: Aleksandr Zatsepin
- Production company: Gorky Film Studio
- Release date: 1987
- Running time: 65 minutes
- Country: Soviet Union
- Language: Russian

She with a Broom, He in a Black Hat (Russian: Она с метлой, он в чёрной шляпе, romanized: Ona s metloy, on v chyornoy shlyape) is a Soviet 1987 musical film, directed by Vitaly Makarov.

== Plot ==
Unsuccessful writer-storyteller Afanasy Zyablik is not able to write a single fairy tale. He can only muster enough energy to write a title. A gust of wind scatters the sheets with names of fairy tales, and the page with the title "I'll Buy a Magic Lamp" appears in the hands of Baba Yaga's daughter in real life. Baba Yaga's daughter runs away from her native forest, taking with her the very same magic lamp that the son of Koshchei the Immortal wanted to possess, to the modern house where Zyablikov's apartment is. She gifts Afanasy a magic hat to help him write his tales and later falls in love with their neighbor the young doctor Alexey.

== Cast ==
- Mikhail Svetin as Afanasy Zyablik, writer-storyteller
- Nina Ruslanova as Vasilisa, wife of the writer-storyteller
- Andrei Sokolov as Alexey Orlov, young doctor
- Mikhail Kononov as The Wizard
- Alexei Ostrovsky as Yura, brother of Orlov
- Vladimir Presnyakov Jr. as Igor
- Maria Selyanskaya as daughter of Baba Yaga
- Alexander Frish as young Koschei
- Yevgeny Yevstigneyev as Raven (dubbing)

== Music ==
=== Soundtrack ===
- "The Song of the Unclean Power" (When the forest melts and the cold witch-moon reigns in the sky)
- "Song of the young Koshchey" (Everything will be as I want)
- "Jinn"
- "The Song of the Daughter of Baba Yaga" (All Tryn-Grass)
- "Everything is impossible possible"
- "The Song of the Daughter of Baba Yaga" (Look, my dear lady)
- "We are so stubborn there"
- "Black Raven in the Sky"
- "The world begins with hope"

=== Playback singers ===
- Alexey Glyzin
- Vladimir Presnyakov Jr.
- Oksana Shabina
- Nikolai Noskov

== Production ==
For Andrei Sokolov this was the first film in his career. He got the role by chance: he came with his actress friend to the studio and while he waited for her he walked around. He was noticed by the director Vitaliy Makarov and got the offer to star in the film.
