= Countermeasure (film) =

Soviet-era Ukrainian political drama film

- Ukrainian: «Відповідна міра» Russian: «Ответная мера»
- Directed by: Vadim Kostromenko
- Written by: Mark Elyash; Hennadi Tarasul
- Produced by: Goskino
- Starring: Petr Shelokhonov; Natalya Fateyeva; Heino Mandri; Leonid Kanevsky; Vitali Bezrukov
- Cinematography: Mykola Ilchuk
- Edited by: Elvira Serova
- Music by: Bogdan Trotzyuk
- Production company: Odessa Film Studio
- Distributed by: Goskino
- Release date: 1975
- Running time: 90 minutes
- Country: Soviet Union
- Languages: Russian, English, German

Countermeasure (Ukrainian: «Відповідна міра», romanized: Vidpovidna mira, Russian: «Ответная мера», romanized: Otvetnaya mera, Hungarian: Ellenintézkedés, German: Gegenmaßnahme) is a 1974 Soviet political drama about the events around construction of oil and gas pipelines from Siberia to Europe during the Cold War. Principal photography occurred at the Odesa Film Studio, in Odesa, UkSSR with additional photography occurring in Chelyabinsk and at the Pervouralsk New Pipe Plant in Pervouralsk, RFSR. The film was produced and distributed by the USSR State Committee for Cinematography (known as Goskino), the central state body for film production in the USSR.

== Plot ==
The film is set in the midst of the Cold War; Amidst the political tension between the United States and Soviet Union (USSR), West Germany agrees to sell advanced components and extra-large oil/gas pipes to the USSR in exchange for oil and gas that will be delivered through the network of newly planned pipelines connecting oil and gas resources of Siberia.

The projected international pipeline (referred to as the "Druzhba Pipeline" or "Friendship Pipeline" and based on a real pipeline built in the early-mid 1960s) is expected to improve business and political relations between the USSR, Europe, and the United States. Ukrainian manager Sergei Peresada and his girlfriend Nina Pavlova represent the Soviet side of the business negotiations between the USSR and West Germany. At the same time, a quiet American man appears on the West German side, who abruptly refuse to supply the previously agreed-upon extra-large pipes for the pipeline.

As a countermeasure, Peresada starts construction of a new metallurgical industry in the Urals in order to produce their own piping. However, the task is daunting, with the USSR unable to immediately produce pipes of the needed size and quality. Peresada eventually delivers the pipes and guarantees completion of the pipeline. He calls Germany and invites his girlfriend, Pavlova, to come back home and celebrate the success together. While Peresada is happily awaiting her return at home, arranging a dinner table, he answers a phone call. The voice on the phone says that, while driving to the airport, Pavlova was killed in a head-on collision.

Fifteen years later, while on a cruise, Peresada finally meets Balsen, his enigmatic and invisible counterpart working on the West German side of the pipeline project.

== Main cast ==
- Petr Shelokhonov as Sergei Ivanovich Peresada
- Natalya Fateyeva as Nina Nikolaevna Pavlova
- Heino Mandri as Herr Balsen
- Imants Adermanis as Hofmann
- Vitali Bezrukov as Dima
- Alfreds Videnieks as Kost
- Aleksey Zadachin as Secretary
- Georgy Drozd
- Boris Seidenberg as Garak
- Leonid Kanevsky as Smirnov
- Gotlib Roninson as Accountant Soykin
- Sergei Yakovlev (actor) as Engineer Firs
- Oleg Mokșanțev
- Harijs Liepins as Karl
- Ints Burans
- Gleb Plaksin as Radio announcer
- Janis Grantins as American adviser
- Juris Lejaskalns
- Inga Tretiakova as Granddaughter
- Anatoli Azo
- Juris Strenga

== Critical reception ==
A critical review of Countermeasure titled "A Higher Responsibility" was written by Boris Pilyatskin in Kultura in 1976. Pilyatskin wrote that the film's leading character, played by Petr Shelokhonov, makes a pleasant and strong impression from the very beginning of the story, but that the overall storyline was too complex. Relative to more pro-Soviet movies, Pilyatskin said it should be focused more on glorifying Soviet leadership and their achievements.

A review by Andrey Kolesnikov published in Kommersant describes the film as a less beautiful depiction of a great Soviet achievement. Kolesnikov also quotes his interviews with Countermeasure scriptwriter Mark Elyash throughout the review. Kolesnikov also referenced Director Yakov Osadchiy — a real Soviet business manager — who the main character, Sergei Peresada, was based-on. The review also discusses the disdain shown by Soviet characters in the film for Germans. It also reveals some peculiar details of filming at Chelyabinsk and the Pervouralsk New Pipe Plant where, according to Kolesnikov metallurgical workers inscribed pipes with profanities about West German chancellor Konrad Adenauer, but this factoid was cut out of the final version of the movie.

== See also ==
- Countermeasure (Russian Wikipedia)
- Countermeasure (Ukrainian Wikipedia)
- Cold War
- Druzhba pipeline

== External sources ==
- Countermeasure (1974 film) (in Russian) a concise (with some reductions) internet version of the movie digitized by Odesa Film Studio, Ukraine: Film «Відповідна міра» on YouTube Odesa Film Studio
- kino-teatr.ru Відповідна міра (1974)
- Countermeasure at IMDb
- Ellenintézkedés - a Hungarian title for Countermeasure (1974 film) (aka: Ответная мера, aka: Otvetnaya mera), a Soviet film poster with film synopsis in English:
- Kinopoisk.ru Яндекс
- Kinorium.com
- Estonian film poster for Countermeasure (1974 film) at gosfilmofond.ru ОТВЕТНАЯ МЕРА — ГОСФИЛЬМОФОНД
- Soviet Russian film poster for Countermeasure (1974 film) at en.kinorium.com
- Film stills from Countermeasure (1974 film): Otvetnaya mera (1975), Otvetnaya mera (1975),Otvetnaya mera (1975), Otvetnaya mera (1975), Otvetnaya mera (1975), , , , , , , , , ,
