= Mikhail Svetin =

Soviet and Russian actor

- Born: 11 December 1929; Kyiv, Ukrainian SSR, Soviet Union
- Died: 30 August 2015 (aged 85); Gatchina, Leningrad Oblast, Russia
- Occupation: Actor
- Years active: 1958—2015

Mikhail Semyonovich Svetin (Russian: Михаил Семёнович Светин; born Michail Solomonovitch Goltsman; 11 December 1929 – 30 August 2015) was a Soviet, Russian actor. He appeared in more than fifty films.

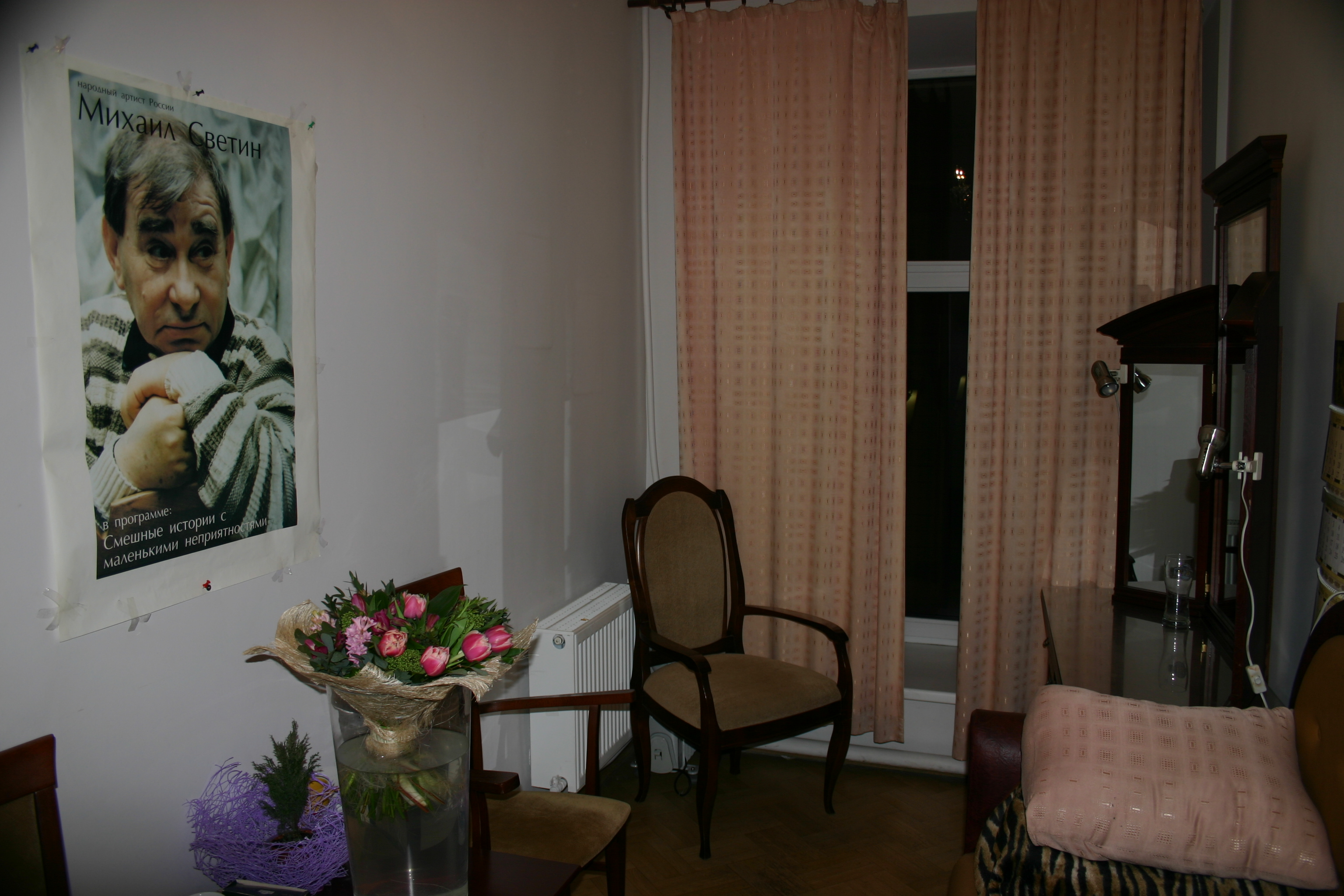
Makeup room at the Comedy Theatre, posthumously designated for Svetin.

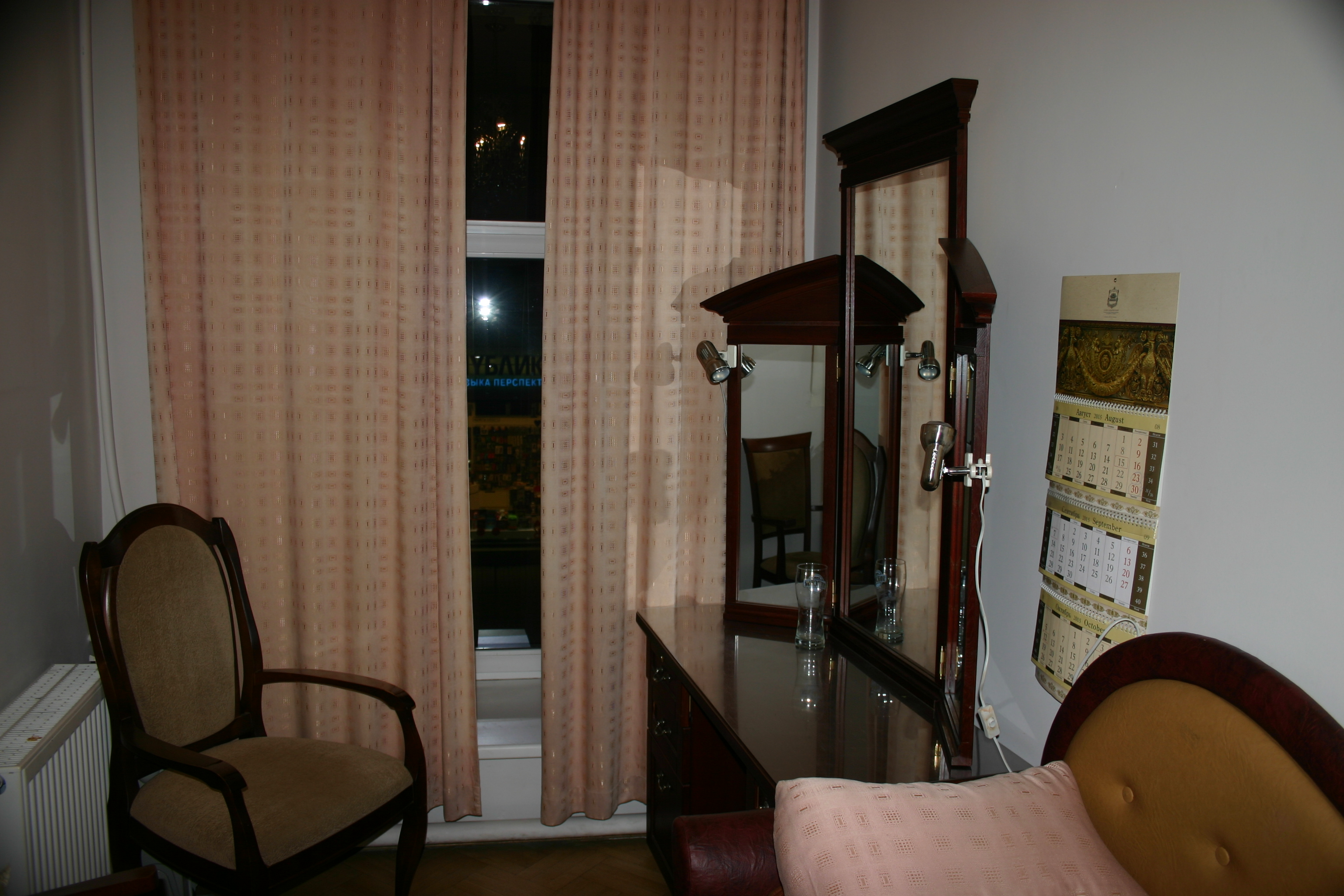

== Biography ==
Born in Kyiv, he was the first child in the family. His father, Solomon Mykhailovych Holtsman, worked as a laborer at the Kyiv Film Factory, and his mother, Hanna Petrivna, was a housewife. He graduated from the Kyiv Music College.

In 1964–1970, he worked at the Kyiv Musical Comedy Theater.

In 1970, he began working at the Maly Drama Theater in Leningrad. Since 1980, he has been an actor at the Akimov Comedy Theater in Leningrad.

Svetin's film career began in 1973 with a role in the movie "Not a Year to Go". Among Svetin's most famous works in cinema are his roles in the films Athos, It Can't Be!

In 1987, Svetin was awarded the title of Honored Artist of the RSFSR, and in 1996 he became People's Artist of Russia. In 2009, Svetin received the Order of Merit for the Fatherland, IV degree.

He has acted in Ukrainian films: "Neither Feather nor Fluff!" (1974), "Captain Crocus and the Secret of the Little Conspirators" (1991), "The Golden Chicken" (1993, "Marshmallows in Chocolate" (1994, "Object Jay" (1995), "Day of the Vanquished" (2009), "The True Story of the Scarlet Sails" (2010) and others.

In August 2015, he was hospitalized with a preliminary diagnosis of stroke. He died on the morning of August 30 in the intensive care unit of the Gatchina Central District Hospital.

== Selected filmography ==
Film
Year	Title	Role	Notes
1993	Children of Iron Gods (Дети чугунных богов)	Nikolai Vasilyevich	
1989	Private Detective, or Operation Cooperation (Частный детектив или операция "Кооперация")	Ivan Ivanovich Pukhov	
1988	Bright Personality (Светлая личность)	Ptashnikov	
1987	A Man from the Boulevard des Capucines (Человек с бульвара Капуцинов)	apothecary	
1987	She with a Broom, He in a Black Hat (Она с метлой, он в чёрной шляпе)	Afanasiy Zyablik	
1982	Charodei (Чародеи)	Foma Ostapych Bryl	
1981	Agony (Агония)	Daniil Terekhov	
1979	Bag of the Collector (Сумка инкассатора)	Chebotaryov	
1979	Nameless Star (Безымянная звезда)	Mr. Ispas	
1976	The Twelve Chairs (Двенадцать стульев)	Bruns, engineer	
1975	It Can't Be! (Не может быть!)	Vitaly Borisovich	
1975	Afonya (Афоня)	Voronkov the driver	

TV
Year	Title	Role	Notes
2003	Yeralash (Ералаш)	Leonid Petrovich, director of the school	
1998	Streets of Broken Lights (Улицы разбитых фонарей)	Tolyan Kolomensky administrator	
1984	The Trust That Has Burst (Трест, который лопнул)	Klein, a porter	
1981	Life and Adventures of Four Friends 3/4 (Жизнь и приключения четырех друзей 3/4)	Thief	
1980	Life and Adventures of Four Friends 1/2 (Жизнь и приключения четырех друзей 1/2)	Thief	
