= Taming of the Fire =

- Directed by: Daniil Khrabrovitsky
- Written by: Daniil Khrabrovitsky
- Produced by: Viktor Tsirul
- Starring: Kirill Lavrov; Ada Rogovtseva; Igor Gorbachyov; Andrei Popov; Igor Vladimirov; Innokenty Smoktunovsky; Petr Shelokhonov; Svetlana Korkoschko; Vsevolod Safonov; Zinovi Gerdt; Vera Kuznetsova
- Cinematography: Sergei Vronsky
- Edited by: Nina Glagoleva; Maria Timofeeva
- Music by: Andrei Petrov
- Release date: April 1972
- Running time: 158 minutes
- Country: Soviet Union
- Language: Russian

Taming of the Fire (Russian: Укрощение огня, romanized: Ukroshcheniye ognya) is a 1972 film, directed by Daniil Khrabrovitsky and starring Kirill Lavrov. The film dramatizes the Soviet viewpoint of the Space Race, and features actual footage of the powerful, three-stage rockets built to launch the first human, Yuri Gagarin, into space on Vostok 1.

== Awards and recognition ==
The Vasilyev Brothers' State Prize of RSFSR was awarded to actor Lavrov for his performance in the leading role. The film also received several awards at various festivals in Europe and the Soviet Union, including the Crystal Globe Award (1972).

== Plot ==
The film, split into two parts, is based on a true story of the creation and development of the Soviet space and missile industry. Due to security concerns, names were altered in the script, though most of the characters are easily recognizable. Sergei Korolev was the prototype for the lead character of Andrei Bashkirtsev, played by Kirill Lavrov.

Part 1: Andrei Bashkirtsev has been obsessed with flying since his youth. Bashkirtsev's career takes shape after meeting with the visionary space scientist Konstantin Tsiolkovsky (played by Innokenti Smoktunovsky). Before World War II he develops the first rockets and builds a launch center in Central Russia. Then he makes the "Katyusha" weapon and takes it to the front-lines of World War II. In spite of his arrest and imprisonment, he continues working on rocket design. He is released from prison upon his request to fight in the front-lines against the Nazis.

Part 2: After the end of World War II, Bashkirtsev designs a new rocket system and works with nuclear scientist Igor Kurchatov on the nuclear missiles program. Then he makes a new rocket that launched "Sputnik" to orbit in 1957 from Baykonur Cosmodrome in Kazakhstan. His next achievement is the first man in space, Yuri Gagarin, and other human space missions. By the mid 1960s Bashkirtsev makes developments for the flight to the Moon. However, Bashkirtsev's uncompromising character causes him many problems with Soviet politicians, in addition to other pressures in his life, and he dies from a heart attack. His mission is carried on by his colleagues and apprentices.

== Main cast ==
- Kirill Lavrov as Andrei Bashkirtsev (character based on Sergei Korolev)
- Ada Rogovtseva as Natalia Bashkirtseva
- Igor Gorbachev as Ognev
- Andrei Popov as Logunov
- Igor Vladimirov as General Anatoly Golovin, Chairman of the State Commission
- Innokenti Smoktunovsky as Konstantin Tsiolkovsky
- Petr Shelokhonov as Mikhail Karelin
- Svetlana Korkoshko as Zoya Konstantinova
- Vsevolod Safonov as Leonid Sretensky
- Zinovi Gerdt as Arthur Matveevich Kartashov, lecturer
- Yevgeny Matveyev as factory director
- Vera Kuznetsova as Bashkirtsev's mother
- Andro Kobaladze as Josef Stalin
- Yuri Leonidov as major general Morozov
- Ivan Ryzhov as Alekseich
- Valentina Khmara as Korolev's secretary
- Vadim Spiridonov as Ivan Flyorov
- Nikolai Barmin as aviation general
- Galiks Kolchitsky as Igor Kurchatov
- Boris Belyakov as constructor
- Georgi Kulikov as Sharov
- Georgi Shevtsov as assembly member
- Yevgeny Steblov as Innokenti Bashkirtsev
- Anatoly Chelombitko as Yuri Gagarin

== Admissions and DVD sales ==
- 1972 theatrical admissions: 27,600,000 (Soviet Union)
- 1972 theatrical admissions in Europe: unknown
- 1991 — 2011 video and DVD sales in Russia and Europe: over 10 million copies

== Production ==
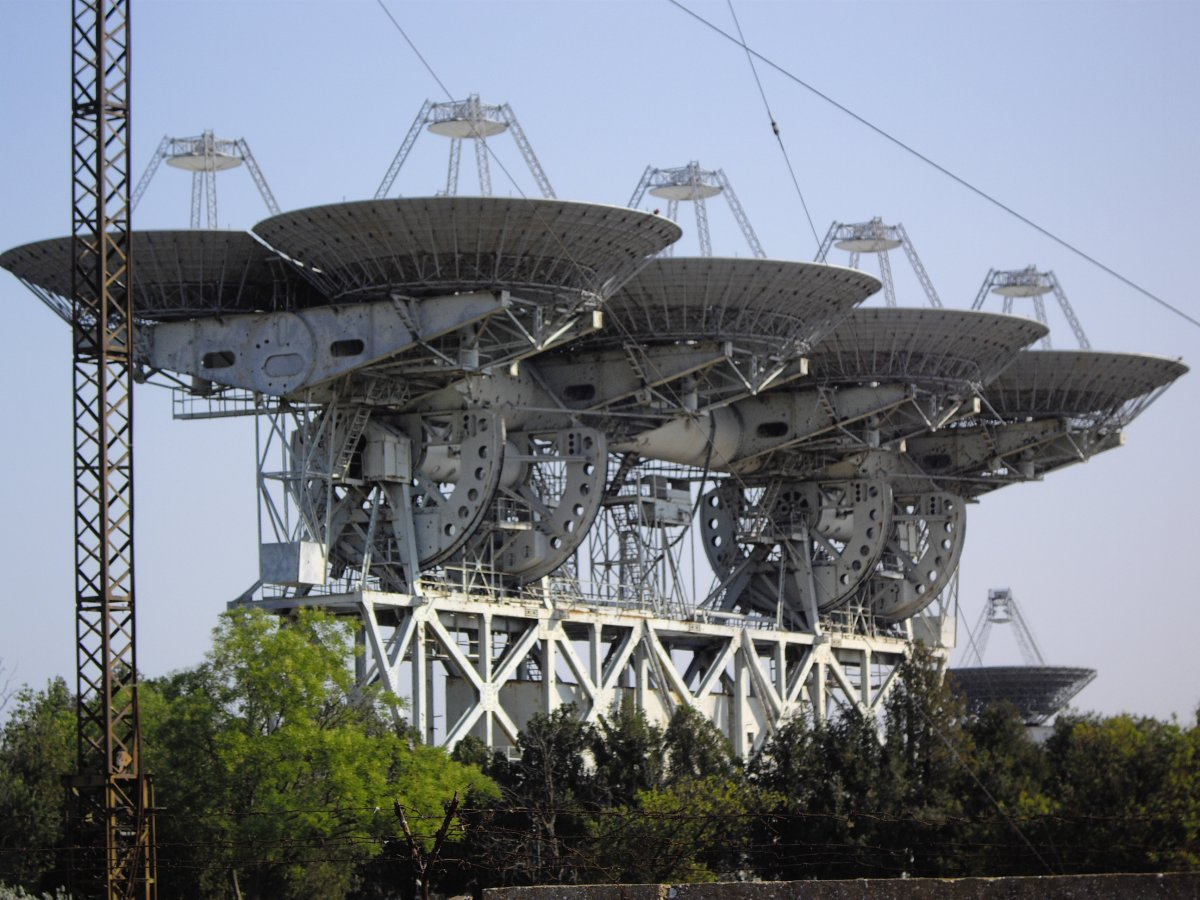
One of two receiving Pluton antenna arrays was a movie set.

- Mosfilm studio was the main production company. Additional production assistance was provided by the Soviet Army and Gagarin Space Center in Moscow, by Baykonur Cosmodrome in Kazakhstan, and by OKB 1 and OKB 3 missile industries in central Russia and in Ukraine.
- All actors and crew had to pass background checks to get clearance for filming at Cosmodrome Baykonur and Gagarin Space Center in 1970 and 1971.
- Footage of Baykonur Kosmodrome in Kazakhstan and of the Soviet Space Center in Moscow add authenticity to the film, but most of the footage have not been released to the public. The original director's cut had 5500 meters of film, but when shown to Brezhnev and the Politbureau it was censored before the public release in 1972; the film was reduced to 4553m and ran 166 minutes. Currently available copies run 158 minutes.
