= Heino Mandri =

Estonian actor

- Born: 11 September 1922; Kohtla-Järve, Estonia
- Died: 3 December 1990 (aged 68); Tallinn, then part of Estonian SSR, Soviet Union
- Occupations: actor theatre teacher
- Years active: 1941–1990
- Awards: Honored artist of the Estonian SSR (1982); People's Artist of the Estonian SSR (1986)

Heino Mandri (11 September 1922 – 3 December 1990) was an Estonian film and stage actor.

== Biography ==
Heino Mandri was born in Kohtla-Järve, but his family moved to Tallinn when Mandri was two years old. In 1946, Mandri graduated in the only class of the short-lived Tallinn Theatre School (1942–1946) set up during the German occupation to carry on the work of the former State School of Performing Arts which had been liquidated during the Soviet occupation in 1940.

In 1948, Mandri was accused in anti-Soviet activities and sentenced for seven years of forced labor. From 1948 to 1954 he served the sentence in the Viatlag prison camp, Lesnoy, Kirov Oblast in Northern Russia.

Mandri was released in 1954 and returned to Estonia, where the Soviet authorities forbade him to get closer than 101 km to Tallinn under the 101st kilometre rule. Mandri settled in Viljandi and worked in Ugala theatre. In 1956 Mandri wrote a personal letter to the Chairman of the Presidium of the Supreme Soviet Kliment Voroshilov, after which he got his sentence retroactively shortened to five years allowing him to enter Tallinn again.

=== Acting career ===
- 1941–1943, 1944–1948 Estonia theatre
- 1943–1944 Narva theatre
- 1954–1958 Ugala theatre
- 1958–1966 and since 1972 – an actor at Kingisepp's Tallinn academic theatre.
- 1966–1972 – actor at Estonian SSR State Youth Theatre (now, the Tallinn City Theatre).
- 1975–1990 – actor at Tallinn City Theatre.

During the 1970s and 1980s, Heino Mandri casually appeared on Estonian national TV delivering his lines with impeccable command of the Estonian language.

In Soviet films, Heino Mandri was usually cast as characters who were officers of the Wehrmacht, German businessmen, or American spies.

Heino Mandri was acquitted of all political charges and fully rehabilitated in his rights only shortly before his death in 1990.

== Selected filmography ==
- Põrgupõhja uus Vanapagan (1964)
- The Lark (1965)
- Countermeasure (1974)
- Diamonds for the Dictatorship of the Proletariat (1975)
- A Time to Live and a Time to Love (1976)
- Young Russia (1981 — 1982)
- TASS Is Authorized to Declare... (1984)
- Entrance to the Labyrinth (1989)
