= Ballad of a Soldier =

1959 Soviet war romance film by Grigory Chukhray

- Directed by: Grigory Chukhray
- Written by: Valentin Yezhov; Grigory Chukhray
- Produced by: M. Chernova
- Starring: Vladimir Ivashov; Zhanna Prokhorenko; Antonina Maksimova; Nikolai Kryuchkov
- Cinematography: Vladimir Nikolayev; Era Savelyeva
- Edited by: Mariya Timofeyeva
- Music by: Mikhail Ziv
- Production company: Mosfilm
- Release date: December 1, 1959
- Running time: 88 minutes
- Country: Soviet Union
- Language: Russian
- Box office: $167,000 (US)

Ballad of a Soldier (Russian: Баллада о солдате, romanized: Ballada o soldate) is a 1959 Soviet war romance film directed and co-written by Grigory Chukhray and starring Vladimir Ivashov and Zhanna Prokhorenko. While set during World War II, Ballad of a Soldier is not primarily a war film. It recounts, within the context of the turmoil of war, various kinds of love: the romantic love of a young couple, the committed love of a married couple, and a mother's love of her child, as a Red Army soldier tries to make it home during a leave. On the way, he meets soldiers and civilians and also falls in love.

The film was produced at Mosfilm and won several awards, including the BAFTA Award for Best Film From Any Source, and was nominated for an Academy Award for Best Original Screenplay.

== Plot ==
A middle-aged farm woman walks through her village and gazes down a country road. A voiceover reveals that her son was killed in the war and buried in a foreign land.

The film then shifts to 1942 and the start of a lengthy flashback. On the Eastern Front, nineteen-year-old Private Alyosha Skvortsov single-handedly destroys two attacking German tanks, more out of self-preservation than bravery. His commander wants to reward him with a decoration, but Alyosha asks instead for a leave to visit his mother and repair the leaking roof of their home. Given the distance to his farm village, he is granted six days ("four for the road, two for the roof").

During his journey, Alyosha sees the devastation the war has wrought on the country, and meets various people. When a jeep he's riding in gets stuck in the mud, Private Pavlov helps push it out. After Pavlov learns Alyosha will be passing through his home city, Pavlov persuades the young soldier to take a present to Pavlov's wife. Pavlov's sergeant reluctantly parts with two bars of soap: the entire supply for the platoon, and a precious commodity under war rationing.

At a subsequent train station, Alyosha generously carries the suitcase of Vasya, a soldier discharged because he has lost a leg. Vasya does not want to go home, as he dreads being a burden to his wife, and their relationship had already been troubled. However, he changes his mind and is welcomed with open arms by the loving woman.

Shura and Alyosha in the freight car

When Alyosha attempts to board a freight car of an army supply train, he is stopped by Gavrilkin, a sentry, who says he has a "beast" of a lieutenant who will not tolerate stowaways. A bribe of a can of beef soon eases Gavrilkin's concern. A young civilian named Shura later sneaks aboard the freight car as well. When she sees she's alone in the car with Alyosha, she is terrified and tries to jump off the speeding train. He prevents her from risking her life. She tells him she is going to visit her fiancé, a pilot recuperating in a hospital. As the hours pass, she loses her fear and mistrust of Alyosha. Gavrilkin spots the civilian stowaway, forcing Alyosha to bribe him anew. When the "beastly" lieutenant discovers the unauthorized passengers, he lets them remain aboard and even makes Gavrilkin return the bribes.

At one stop, while Alyosha is out of the car fetching water, the train leaves without him. Frantic to be reunited with Shura, he gets a lift to the next station from an old woman truck driver, but he is too late; the train is already gone. However, Shura has gotten off the train and is waiting for him. The couple then go to see Pavlov's wife. They find she is living with another man. They grudgingly hand her the soap, and exit her apartment in a huff. Alyosha reconsiders and returns to the apartment to take back the soap. He delivers it instead to Pavlov's invalid father.

When Alyosha and Shura must finally part, she confesses she lied: there is no fiancé, only an aunt. Alyosha realizes too late, after his train departs, that when Shura said she had no one, she was telling him she loves him. His train is halted by a blown-up bridge and set on fire by German bombers. He helps passengers evacuate the burning train. With time running out on his six-day leave, Alyosha rafts across the river and persuades another truck driver to give him a ride to his rural village, Sosnovka. He gets to see his mother only for a few minutes before having to make his way back to his unit. His mother vows to wait for him. The flashback ends, and the voiceover tells us that while Alyosha could have gone far in life if he had lived, he will always be remembered simply as a Russian soldier.

== Cast ==
- Vladimir Ivashov as Private Alyosha Skvortsov
- Zhanna Prokhorenko as Shura
- Antonina Maksimova as Alyosha's mother
- Nikolai Kryuchkov as the General
- Yevgeni Urbansky as Vasya
- Elza Lezhdey as Vasya's wife
- Aleksandr Kuznetsov as Gavrilkin
- Yevgeni Teterin as the Lieutenant
- Valentina Markova as Liza (Pavlov's wife)
- Marina Kremnyova as Zoya (neighbor girl)
- Vladimir Pokrovsky as Pavlov's invalid father
- Georgi Yumatov as Sergeant giving bars of soap
- Gennadi Yukhtin as Private Seryozha Pavlov
- Valentina Telegina as old woman truck driver
- Lev Borisov as joking soldier on train
- Yevgeny Yevstigneyev as truck driver

The two lead actors, Ivashov and Prokhorenko, were both only nineteen years old and did not have much acting experience. Grigory Chukhray commented on his casting choice:

We took a big risk. It was risky to give the main roles to quite inexperienced actors. Not many would have done so in those times, but we ventured and did not regret afterwards. Volodya and Zhanna gave the most precious colouring to the film, that is, the spontaneity and charm of youth.

Both would go on to long careers in cinema.

== Production ==
According to longtime TCM host Robert Osborne, Soviet leader Nikita Khrushchev was a fan of the director, so Chukhray was given more leeway than normal.

Although the film is set in 1942, the characters wear shoulder boards—insignia that were not introduced into the Red Army until 1943. Chukhray did this intentionally. He anticipated that the film would be distributed in Europe, where the image of the Soviet soldier-liberator had already taken shape specifically in this uniform—complete with shoulder boards. He feared that audiences in the countries liberated by Soviet troops might fail to recognize the liberator in the older-style uniform, potentially remarking: "No, these aren't the ones who liberated us".

Originally, Oleg Strizhenov and Liliya Aleshnikova were cast in the lead roles, but they were replaced at the insistence of Chukhray. On the first day of filming (during the scene depicting Alyosha's departure from the front), Chukhray fractured his leg; later, when filming resumed, he contracted typhoid fever. Due to her involvement in the film, Zhanna Prokhorenko had to transfer from the Moscow Art Theatre School-Studio to VGIK (the All-Russian State Institute of Cinematography). A portion of the film crew quit the production due to creative differences regarding the director's artistic vision.

== Reception ==
Ballad of a Soldier was released on December 1, 1959, in the Soviet Union and sold 30.1 million tickets at screenings.

The film was released in the United States in 1960 as part of a Soviet-American cultural exchange during the period of de-Stalinization and thaw in the Cold War. Other Soviet films shown in the US at this time included The Cranes Are Flying (1957) and Fate of a Man (1959). As one American historian noted, all three films were alike in emphasizing "interiority, human frailty, and private life over state and party—making a powerful political statement by being seemingly apolitical."

Ballad of a Soldier received considerable praise for its technical craft and its strong, yet subtle story. With its earnest and unabashedly youthful protagonist, the film was hailed as an instant classic by Soviet and American critics. The New York Times reviewer Bosley Crowther applauded Chukhray's ability to make the film "flow in such a swift, poetic way that the tragedy of it is concealed by a gentle lyric quality." He also noted the "two splendid performances" by Ivashov and Prokhorenko.

Ballad of a Soldier won the Lenin Prize in 1961, as did its director and producer. On the review aggregator website Rotten Tomatoes, 94% of 16 critics' reviews are positive.

A DVD of the film, featuring interviews with the director and two lead actors, was made available in 2002 in the Criterion Collection.

=== Cultural impact ===
In the 2025 anime film Chainsaw Man — The Movie: Reze Arc, the characters Denji and Makima watch a film that serves as a direct homage to Ballad of a Soldier.

=== Accolades ===
- 1960 Cannes Film Festival - Special Jury Prize
- 5th San Francisco International Film Festival, 1960 - Golden Gate Award for Best Film and Golden Gate Award for Best Director
- Lenin Prize, 1961
- Bodil Awards for Best European Film, 1961
- Nomination for the 1961 Academy Award for Best Original Screenplay – Grigory Chukhray and Valentin Yezhov
- 1962 BAFTA Award for Best Film From Any Source

== See also ==
- Thaaye Unakkaga, a 1960 Indian film remake
- List of Russian Academy Award winners and nominees for Best Original Screenplay
