= Dauria (film) =

1971 film directed by Viktor Tregubovich

- Directed by: Viktor Tregubovich
- Written by: Konstantin Sedykh
- Starring: Vitali Solomin; Petr Shelokhonov; Yefim Kopelyan; Vasily Shukshin; Yury Solomin
- Cinematography: Yevgeny Mezentsev
- Music by: Gennady Portnov
- Production company: Lenfilm
- Distributed by: RUSCICO
- Release date: 1971
- Running time: 182 minutes
- Country: Soviet Union
- Language: Russian

Dauria (Russian: Даурия) is a 1971 Soviet historical adventure drama set in Siberia, Russia. Adapted from the novel of the same name by Konstantin Sedykh and directed by Viktor Tregubovich.

While the movie was criticized by some Soviet critics for its historical inaccuracies, its epic scope and intense battle scenes won wide praise and has been credited with affecting the political landscape of Siberian Russia.

== Plot ==
Epic film about traditional life of Cossacks in the Siberian province of Dauria at the time of the First World War and the communist revolution in Russia. Focused on a Cossack village that lives under the guidance of a strong leader, Ataman (Kopelyan), as well, as their way of life and its effect on young Cossack Roman Ulybin (Solomin) who is mistreated because his father, a mature Cossack Severian Ulybin (Shelokhonov) despises his estranged brother Vasili Ulybin, Roman's uncle, for his secret affiliation with the Red Communist revolutionaries.

Roman Ulybin is madly in love with beautiful Dashutka (Golovina). Roman is desperately asking his father, Severian Ulybin, to send a Matchmaker (Shukshina) to perform a traditional wooing ritual with the parents of the desired girl before it's too late. But father Severian has no money for such a ritual, while a wealthy crook has already hired the same Matchmaker, and soon the crook's son gets married at the lavish traditional wedding with singing, dancing and drinking in the Russian style.

So, frustrated Roman Ulybin leaves his father's home to follow his uncle Vasili Ulybin, an emerging Red Communist revolutionary. During the Russian Civil War, Roman is ordered by his communist uncle to seize the treasures of the Bank of Russia in the city of Chita. At the same time, an anarchist gang headed by a Navy deserter Lavrov commits robbery of the same Bank of Russia, so they can flee to Manchuria with the stolen gold. While fighting with the anarchists for the gold inside the bank, Roman is badly injured, but he escapes and joins a small group of men in the taiga wilderness. Soon, the advancing White Army attacks their hidden base in the woods. Roman and his men are captured by a group of anti-communist Cossacks who sentence them to death by shooting, but Roman manages to escape again by jumping into a small river before getting hit. After his escape, Roman finds the farmhouse of his previous love Dashutka who is now alone and cares for him until he heals.After reconnecting with her and healing, Roman goes to visit his parents and finds out that his father was forced into service in the anti-communist White Army. While Roman is resting at the home of his parents, the anti-communist Ataman tries to arrest him, but Roman's father Severian hides the son and helps him escape. After nearly being caught in his parents house, Roman reunites with the Red revolutionaries. Meanwhile, a detachment of the White Army headed by an executioner brutally beats and humiliates the people who are not loyal to the Tzar of Russia. The executioner commits a sadistic torture of the village leader Ataman. Roman's father, Severian, is murdered by another executioner in front of the people of the village, and Roman arrives right as the executioners escape, enraged, he witnesses his mother crying over the dead body of his father.

== Cast ==
- Vitali Solomin as Roman Ulybin. The son of Severian
- Petr Shelokhonov as Severian Ulybin. The father of Roman
- Yefim Kopelyan as Ataman Kargin, the leader of Cossacks
- Vasily Shukshin as Vasili Ulybin, the leader of Communists
- Yury Solomin as Semen, a Communist agent
- Mikhail Kokshenov as Fedot, the neighbor of Ulybins
- Arkadi Trusov as Grandfather Ulybin
- Vera Kuznetsova as Ulybina. The wife of Severian
- Viktor Pavlov as Nikifor, a hard core Cossack
- Svetlana Golovina as Dashutka, the love interest of Roman Ulybin
- Zhenya Malyantsev as Roman's little brother
- Fyodor Odinokov as Dashutka's father
- Lyubov Malinovskaya as Dashutka's mother
- Yuri Nazarov as a runaway prisoner
- Vsevolod Kuznetsov as Cossack Platon Volokitin
- Lidiya Fedoseyeva-Shukshina as Matchmaker
- Zinovi Gerdt as Tsarist General Semenov
- Georgy Shtil as Anarchist Revolutionary
- Igor Yefimov as Cossack
- Dmitri Masanov as Cossack
- Vladimir Losev as Cossack
- Sergei Polezhaev as White Russian officer
- Aleksandr Demyanenko as Executioner
- Igor Dmitriev as Executioner

== Crew ==
- Director: Viktor Tregubovich
- Writers: Konstantin Sedykh, Yuri Klepikov, Viktor Tregubovich
- Cinematographer: Yevgeny Mezentsev
- Composer: Gennady Portnov
- Production Designer: Grachya Mekinyan

== Production ==
- Produced by Lenfilm studios.
- Filming dates 1969–1971.
- Filming locations: Siberia, Trans-Baikal region, Narva, Estonia, Lenfilm studios, Leningrad, Russia.
- Over 5 hundred extras took part in filming.
- Leading actors took horseback riding classes for several months before and during filming.
- A unique stunt was performed for the character of Severian Ulybin: live horse with a mannequin in a Cossack costume jumped down from 70-meters-high cliff into the cold river.

== Release ==
- 1971 theatrical release, Soviet Union
- 1975 theatrical release in Finland and other European nations
- 1985 VHS release, Soviet Union
- 2002 DVD release, worldwide

== Reception ==
- Attendance: 47 million, theatrical, in the Soviet Union.

== DVD release ==
- 2002 DVD released by RUSCICO. It is based on the shorter 182 minute version, which was edited for European release in 1975. Dubbing for DVD in three languages was made by professional actors in English, French, and Russian. Subtitles in Arabic, Chinese, Dutch, French, English, German, Hebrew, Italian, Japanese, Portuguese, Russian, Spanish, and Swedish.
- Defects on DVD include errors in sequence of scenes and wrong listing of scenes in the DVD cover booklet. There are some mistakes and discrepancies between English and Russian versions of the DVD.
