= Leonid Kanevsky =

Soviet Russian actor

- לאוניד קנבסקי
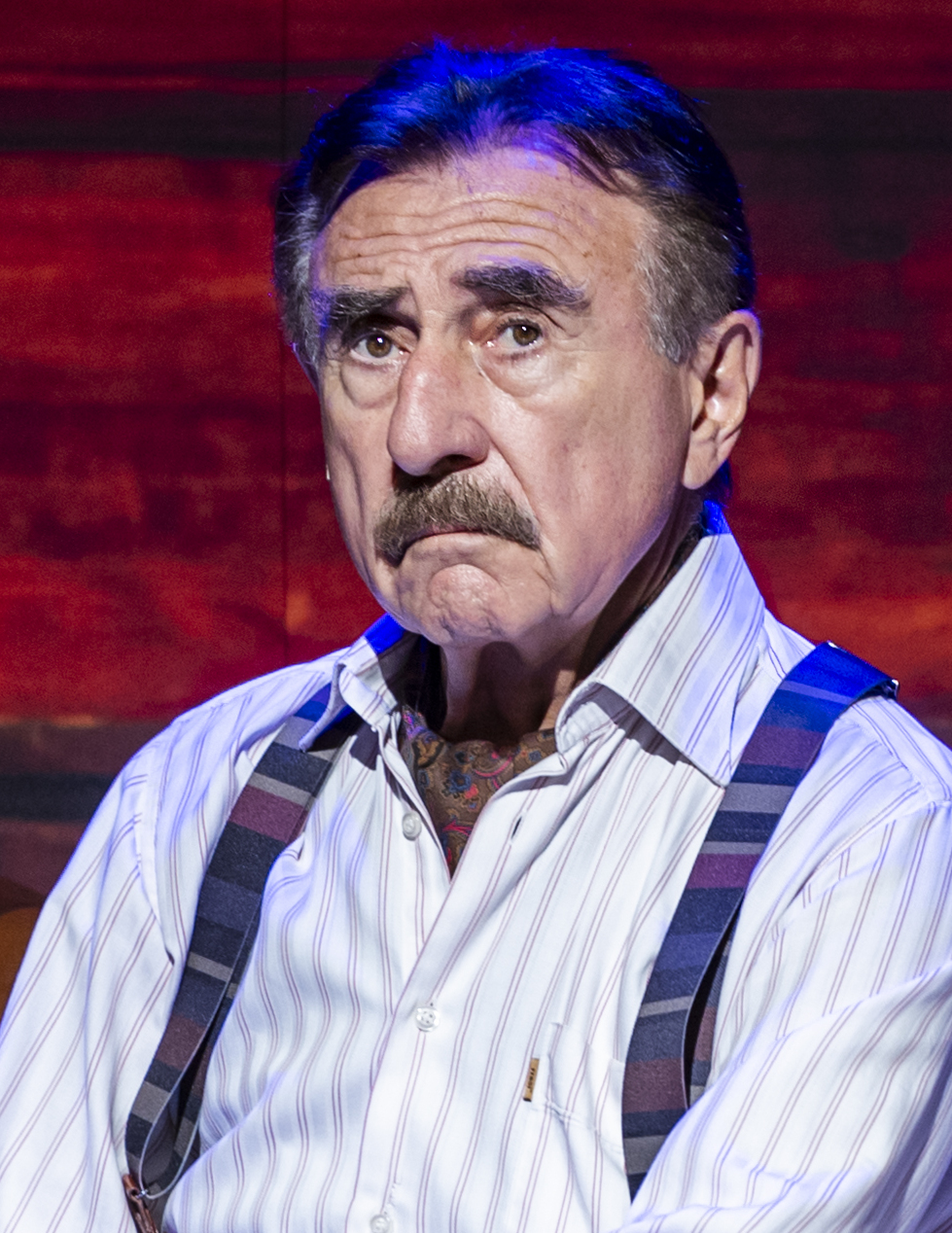
- Leonid Kanevsky in 2023
- Born: May 2, 1939 (age 87); Kiev, Ukrainian SSR, Soviet Union
- Years active: 1961–present
- Spouse: Anna Berezina

Leonid Semyonoviсh Kanevski (Ukrainian: Леонід Семенович Каневський, Russian: Леони́д Семёнович Кане́вский, Hebrew: לאוניד קנבסקי; 2 May 1939, Kyiv, Ukrainian SSR) is a Soviet, Russian and Israeli actor. He became popular with the Soviet audience after starring in The Investigation Is Conducted by ZnaToKi detective series where he appeared as major Tomin.

== Biography ==
Leonid Semyonovich Kanevsky was born on May 2, 1939, in Kyiv, Ukraine, into a Jewish family.

His mother studied piano at the Kyiv Conservatory, completing two years of coursework before marrying at age 19, leaving the conservatory, and relocating with her husband to the Caucasus, where he worked.

In 1933, his elder brother Alexander was born, followed six years later by Leonid himself.

At age 17, Kanevsky moved to Moscow and enrolled in the Shchukin Theatre Institute, studying under Vera Konstantinovna Lvova. From 1960 to 1967, he performed at the Moscow Lenkom Theatre. He later joined the Moscow Malaya Bronnaya Theatre, where he remained until 1991.

Kanevsky made his film debut with a minor role in Forty Minutes Before Dawn (1963). He gained widespread recognition for his portrayal of police major Alexander Tomin in the TV series The Investigation Is Conducted by Experts, as well as for roles such as the smuggler in the comedy The Diamond Arm and the haberdasher Bonacieux in the miniseries D’Artagnan and Three Musketeers.

In 1991, Kanevsky repatriated to Israel, where he co-founded the Gesher Theatre (Hebrew for "bridge") in Tel Aviv with director Yevgeny Arye. The theater’s troupe initially consisted primarily of Russian actors from Moscow and Leningrad theaters.

In 2003, he hosted the game show Ninth Wave on Israel’s Channel 9. Since January 2006, he has served as the presenter of the documentary series The Investigation Continues... on NTV.

2010s

In 2009, Kanevsky appeared in the TV series Semin and its sequel Semin: Retribution He also voiced the character Finn McMissile, a spy, in the Russian dub of the animated film Cars 2.

Over his decades-long career, Kanevsky has acted in over 50 films and TV series. He is a member of the Russian Union of Cinematographers.

== Filmography ==
- 1963 — Forty Minutes Before Dawn — Store manager in a village general store
- 1965 — City of Masters — Head of the secret police
- 1967 — The Life and Ascension of Yuras Bratchik — A henchman of the cardinal, posing as a blind beggar
- 1967 — Two Hours Earlier — Ensemble administrator
- 1968 — Spring on the Oder — Intelligence officer Oganesyan
- 1968 — Smile to Your Neighbor — House Manager
- 1968 — The Punisher — Mr. Andreas
- 1968 — The Diamond Arm — Contrabandist, put in plaster
- 1969 — The Red Tent — Italian Radio Operator
- 1969 — Every Evening at Eleven — Saxophonist
- 1969 — Abduction — Director
- 1969 — Commandant Lauterburg — Collins
- 1970 — Amazing Boy — Boxer Uppercut
- 1971 — 2003 — The Investigation Is Conducted by ZnaToKi — Tomin
- 1972 — Train Stop — Two Minutes — Krasovsky
- 1972 — So the Summer Has Passed
- 1974 — Adventures in a City that does not Exist — Captain Bonaventure
- 1975 — Countermeasure - Smirnov
- 1978 — d'Artagnan and Three Musketeers
- 1982 — Along Unknown Paths — Desyatnik Millionskiy
- 1983 — Mary Poppins, Goodbye — as Bob Goodetty
- 1984 — Pippi Longstocking
- 1990 — Death in the Cinema
- 2001 — Late Marriage
- 2005 — Poor Relatives
- 2008 — Photographer
- 2009 — Semin
- 2010 — Between the Lines — Efim (Fima) Melnik
- 2011 — Semin. Retribution —Boris Petrovich Semin, Police colonel, Head of Department (main role)
- 2011 — Cars 2 — Finn McMissile (Russian version)
- 2012 — Welcome and … Our Condolences — as himself (outro gag)
- 2017 — Purely Moscow Murders —Grigory
- 2017 — Hotel of Happy Hearts — Aron Moiseevich, Pawnshop Owner
- 2018 — What Men Talk About. Continuation — Semyon, Lesha's Father
- 2019 — Women's Version. The Secret of the Party Dacha — Boris Semyonovich Bystrykh, Member of the Central Committee of the CPSU, father of Svetlana

== TV ==
Kanevsky is the host and main person behind the NTV crime documentary series The investigation led by... (2006–).
