= The Inspector-General =

- Russian: Ревизор
- Directed by: Vladimir Petrov
- Written by: Nikolay Gogol (play); Vladimir Petrov
- Produced by: Osman Karaev
- Starring: Igor Gorbachyov; Yuri Tolubeyev; Anastasia Georgievskaya; Tamara Nosova; Aleksandr Polinsky; Vasiliy Kornukov
- Cinematography: Yuri Yekelchik
- Music by: Nikolai Timofeyev
- Production company: Mosfilm
- Release date: 1952
- Running time: 132 min.
- Country: Soviet Union
- Language: Russian

The Inspector-General (Russian: Ревизор, romanized: Revizor) is a 1952 Soviet crime comedy film directed by Vladimir Petrov, whose script is an adaptation of the satirical play The Government Inspector by Nikolay Gogol.

== Plot ==
The film closely follows the original text of Nikolai Gogol's satirical play The Government Inspector small provincial town, Mayor Anton Antonovich Skvoznik-Dmukhanovsky (played by Yuri Tolubeyev) informs his circle of local officials about a letter warning them of the imminent arrival of a government inspector traveling incognito. Two landowners, Bobchinsky and Dobchinsky, while dining at an inn, encounter a man named Khlestakov and mistakenly identify him as the inspector. They quickly convince others of their assumption.

The supposed inspector, Ivan Alexandrovich Khlestakov (played by Igor Gorbachev), is actually a low-level bureaucrat from St. Petersburg traveling to Saratov with his servant Osip (played by Alexei Gribov). Stranded in the town after losing his money in a card game, Khlestakov is unable to pay for his lodging or food. The mayor, believing Khlestakov to be an important official, invites him to tour the town's establishments, hosts a lavish feast in his honor, and later welcomes him into his home.

Drunk on the attention, Khlestakov realizes he has been mistaken for someone else. Embellishing his importance, he claims to be a friend of Alexander Pushkin and almost a field marshal. Taking advantage of his newfound status, Khlestakov begins courting both the mayor's wife and daughter and borrows over 1,000 rubles from the officials. He eventually promises to marry the mayor's daughter before abruptly leaving town. During a celebration for the engagement, the town's postmaster delivers a letter from Khlestakov, which reveals his true identity. As the officials are reeling from this revelation, a gendarme announces the arrival of the actual government inspector from St. Petersburg. The film concludes with the mayor and his officials frozen in shock and fear.

== Starring ==
- Igor Gorbachyov as Ivan Alexandrovich Khlestakov, the 'inspector general'
- Yuri Tolubeyev as Mayor Anton Antonovich Skvoznik-Dmukhanovsky
- Anastasia Georgievskaya as Mme. Anna Andreyevna Skvoznik-Dmukhanoskaya (as Anastasiya Georgiyevskaya)
- Tamara Nosova as Maria Antonovna Skvoznik-Dmukhanovskaya
- Aleksandr Polinsky as Pyotr Ivanovich Dobchinsky
- Vasiliy Kornukov as Pyotr Ivanovich Bobchinsky
- Sergei Blinnikov as Judge Ammos Fyodorovich Lyapkin-Tyapkin
- Mikhail Yanshin as Commissioner of Charities Artemy Filippovich Zemlyanika
- Erast Garin as Postmaster Ivan Kuzmich Shepkin
- Pavel Pavlenko as School Supt. Luka Lukich Khlopov
- Aleksandr Guzeyev as Dr. Christian Ivanovich Hubner
- Aleksey Gribov as Osip
- Elena Ponsova as Ivanova, a sergeant's widow
- Anastasia Zueva as Fevonya Poshlyopkina
- Vladimir Yershov as Gendarme (uncredited)
