= Alexander Goloborodko =

Russian actor

- Born: Alexander Alexandrovich Goloborodko; 28 September 1938 (age 87); Dniprodzerzhynsk, Ukrainian SSR, USSR
- Other name: Aleksandr Goloborodko
- Occupation: Actor
- Years active: 1960–present
- Spouse: Svetlana Shershnyova
- Children: 1
- Awards: USSR State Prize (1977); Order of Honour (2010)

Alexander Alexandrovich Goloborodko (Russian: Александр Александрович Голобородько; born September 28, 1938) is a Soviet and Russian actor of theater and cinema, People's Artist of the RSFSR (1988).

== Early life and education ==
Goloborodko was born on September 28, 1938, in Dniprodzerzhynsk.

Goloborodko began acting in amateur productions when still at school. In 1960 he graduated from Kiev Theater Institute.

== Career ==
After graduation, Goloborodko was accepted into the Crimean Russian Drama Theater acting troupe. In 1971, he became an artist of Lesya Ukrainka National Academic Theater of Russian Drama. In 1976, at the invitation of Mikhail Tsarev, he moved to the Maly Theater. In 1985 he moved to the troupe of Mossovet Theatre.

In the movie debuted in 1967 in the movie The Andromeda Nebula.

As of 2008 he was president of the Sozvezdie / Constellation International Film Festival, and vice-president of the Russian Guild of Film Actors.

== Personal life ==
His wife, Svetlana Shershnyova, is an actress at the Mossovet Theater, and their daughter is actress and TV presenter Oksana Goloborodko.

== Selected filmography ==
- The Andromeda Nebula (1967) as Ren Boz
- Viimne reliikvia (1969) as Gabriel
- Eleven Hopes (1975) as Lavrenyov
- Waiting for Love (1981) as watcher
- Battle of Moscow (1985) as Konstantin Rokossovsky
- The Royal Hunt (1990) as Grigory Orlov
- Stalingrad (1990) as Konstantin Rokossovsky
