= All Remains to People =

- Directed by: Georgy Natanson
- Written by: Samuil Alyoshin (play and screenplay)
- Starring: Nikolai Cherkasov; Sophia Pilyavskaya; Andrei Popov; Elina Bystritskaya; Igor Ozerov
- Cinematography: Sergei Ivanov
- Music by: Vladlen Chistyakov
- Production company: Lenfilm
- Release date: 1963
- Running time: 100 minutes
- Country: USSR
- Language: Russian

All Remains to People (Russian: Всё остаётся людям, romanized: Vsyo ostayotsya lyudyam) is a 1963 Soviet drama film directed by Georgy Natanson. Based on the namesake play by Samuil Alyoshin.

== Plot ==
Renowned scientist Dronov works in Novosibirsk on the creation of an advanced reaction engine. He has a heart disease and fears being unable to complete his job. Unfortunately, the prototype engine repeatedly fails to pass the test at a Moscow factory. Dronov abandons the rest of his work, including the leadership of the Institute which is entrusted to his disciple Morozov.

== Cast ==
- Nikolai Cherkasov as Fyodor Dronov, academician
- Sophia Pilyavskaya as Natalia, his wife
- Andrei Popov as father Seraphim
- Elina Bystritskaya as Ksenia Rumyantseva
- Igor Ozerov as Alexey Vyazmin
- Igor Gorbachev as Victor Morozov, director of the Institute
- Yefim Kopelyan as Filimonov
- Galina Anisimova as Asya

== Awards ==
- Prize for the best male role in the All-Union Film Festival (Nikolai Cherkasov) (1964)
- Lenin Prize (Nikolai Cherkasov) (1964)
