= Vera Kuznetsova =

Russian actress

- Born: 6 October 1907; Saratov, Russian Empire
- Died: 11 December 1994 (aged 87); Saint Petersburg, Russia
- Occupation: Actress
- Years active: 1944-1991
- Spouse: Anatoly Kuznetsov (1905 — 1954)
- Children: 2
- Awards: Honored Artist of the RSFSR (1976)

Vera Andreyevna Kuznetsova (née Sdobnikova; Russian: Вера Андреевна Кузнецова; 6 October 1907 — 11 December 1994) was a Russian actress. She appeared in more than fifty films from 1944 to 1991.

== Selected filmography ==
Year	Title	Role	Notes
1954	A Big Family	Agafya Karpovna Zhurbina	
1956	The Rumyantsev Case	Tatyana	
1958	Eugene Onegin	peasant woman	
1959	A Home for Tanya	Natalya Avdeyevna	
1960	A Gentle Creature	Lukerya	
1965	There Was an Old Couple	Natalya Maksimovna Gusakova	
1967	A Winter Morning	aunt Tanya	
1971	Dauria	Avdotya Ulybina	
1972	Taming of the Fire	Bashkirtsev's mother	
1973	Stepmom	Yekaterina Alekseevna	
