= Igor Gorbachyov =

Soviet and Russian actor, theater director and pedagogue

- Игорь Горбачёв
- Born: October 20, 1927; Leningrad, Russian SFSR, Soviet Union
- Died: February 19, 2003 (aged 75); Saint Petersburg, Russia
- Occupations: Actor; theater director; pedagogue
- Years active: 1952–2002

Igor Olegovich Gorbachyov (Note: Russian: Игорь Олегович Горбачёв, romanized: Igor Olegovich Gorbachyov) (October 20, 1927 – February 19, 2003) was a Soviet and Russian actor, theater director and pedagogue. People's Artist of the USSR (1972). Hero of Socialist Labour (1987).

== Biography ==
=== Early life and education ===
Gorbachyov was born October 20, 1927, in Leningrad in the family of a civil engineer.

Upon graduation from school in 1945, he entered the philosophy faculty of Leningrad University. During his studies, Igor Gorbachyov played in the student theater. At the All-Union show of amateur talent, he took first place for the role of Khlestakov in the play "The Inspector General". The student was noticed, and soon was invited to the same role in the film The Inspector General (1952), directed by Vladimir Petrov.

=== Theatre ===
In 1952, Gorbachyov was accepted into the troupe of the Gorky Bolshoi Drama Theater without theatrical education. He played the role of Don Cesar de Bazan in the play "Rui Blas" by Victor Hugo, Florindo Areutusi in "The Servant of Two Masters" by Carlo Goldoni, Shvandu in the production of "Lyubov Yarovaya" by Konstantin Trenev.

In 1954, he moved to the Leningrad Academic Drama Theater named after Pushkin. At the same time, Gorbachyov entered the acting faculty of the Leningrad Theater Institute named after Ostrovsky which he graduated in 1959.

Virtually all of his life was connected with the Leningrad Drama Theater. The most successful works were played by him in the performances of the classical repertoire: Treplev in The Seagull by Anton Chekhov, Vaska Pepel in Maxim Gorky's play "The Lower Depths", Lavretsky in Ivan Turgenev's "Noble Nest", Protasov in the play "The Children of the Sun" by Maxim Gorky, Chichikov in "Dead Souls" by Nikolai Gogol, Cyrano de Bergerac in the eponymous play of Edmond Rostand.

Between 1975 and 1991 Gorbachyov was the artistic director and chief director of the theater. He staged the productions: "Maria Tudor" by Victor Hugo (1964), "While the Heart beats" by Daniil Khrabrovitsky (1977), "Veranda in the Woods" by Ignaty Dvoretsky (1980), "Field Marshal Kutuzov" by Vladimir Solovyov (1985) and others.

=== Film ===
In the cinema, the actor began to appear in the 1950s after a successful debut as Khlestakov. He played mainly supporting roles, until the mid-1960s, when he started to get lead roles. He starred in the film All Remains to People (1964), the crime drama Two Tickets for the afternoon session (1966). Gorbachyov participated in one of the well-known adaptations of Anton Chekhov, directed by Joseph Kheifitz on the novel Ionych (In the City of S) (1966).

The greatest success to Gorbachyov was the role of Alexander Yakushev in the serial television film directed by Sergei Kolosov Operation "Trust"(1967).

In the 1970s, Gorbachyov starred in the Detective Circle (1972) (sequel to the film Two Tickets for the Afternoon Session), historical-revolutionary film Sveaborg (1972), historical and biographical film Taming of the Fire (1972) and others.

In the 1980s, the artist performed roles in the films Seven Happy Notes (1981), Mother Mary (1982), For Blue Nights (1983), Prokhindiada, or Running in Place (1984) and others.

From the early 1990s, the actor started to receive less roles. His last work was a role in the detective series At the Knives (1998). In total, the actor has more than 50 roles in the cinema.

=== Teaching ===
In 1958-1975 and 1979-1991 Gorbachyov taught at the Leningrad Institute of Theater, Music and Cinematography. In 1992, Igor Gorbachyov founded the Theater Institute "School of Russian Drama" (now the theater art department of the School of Russian Drama named after Gorbachyov of the St. Petersburg State University of Service and Economics).

=== Death ===
On February 19, 2003, after a long illness, Gorbachyov died. The actor is buried at the Literary Bridge of the Volkovo Cemetery in St. Petersburg.

=== Honors ===
In 1972 he was awarded the title People's Artist of the USSR. In 1973, the actor became a laureate of the State Prize of the RSFSR named after Stanislavsky. In 1987 he was awarded the title of Hero of Socialist Labor. The artist was awarded the Order of the October Revolution (1971), the Friendship of Peoples (1977), the Red Banner of Labor (1982), the Order of Lenin (1987).

In 2003, the Institute "School of Russian Drama" was named after Igor Gorbachyov.

=== Personal life ===
Gorbachyov was married to actress Lyudmila Gorbachyova (1930–2010), with whom she lived in marriage for more than 50 years.

The actor had a son, Igor.

== Partial filmography ==
- The Inspector-General (1952) as Ivan Alexandrovich Khlestakov, the 'inspector general'
- Lyubov Yarovaya (1953) as Fyodor Shvandya
- Belinsky (1953) as student
- Commander of the Ship (1954) as Plaksin
- A Crazy Day (1956) as Kostya Galushkin, Klava Ignatyuk's husband
- All Remains to People (1963) as Viktor Morozov
- Returned Music (1964) as Eric the Light-Eyed
- Little Hare (1965) as Shabashnikov
- Two Tickets for a Daytime Picture Show (1967) as Nikolayev
- In S. City (1967) as Turkin
- Taming of the Fire (1972) as Yevgeniy Ognev
- A Circle (1972) as police colonel Nikolay Nikolayev
- Eleven Hopes (1976) as Nikolai Ivanovich
- The Elder Son (1976, TV Movie) as Sarafanovs' neighbour (uncredited)
- Pugachev (1979) as Nikita Ivanovich Panin
- Behind the Blue Nights (1983, TV Movie) as Valery Zabotenko
- A Rogue's Saga (1984) as Mikhail Mikhailovich
- Silver Strings (1988) as Alexander III of Russia
- My Best Friend, General Vasili, Son of Joseph Stalin (1991) as Professor Serebrovsky

== Bibliography ==
- Ann C. Paietta. Saints, Clergy and Other Religious Figures on Film and Television, 1895–2003. McFarland, 2005.
