= Lev Lemke =

Soviet and Russian actor

Personal details
- Born: August 25, 1931
- Died: August 4, 1996 (aged 64) Saint Petersburg, Russia
- Profession: Actor

Lev Isaakovich Lemke (Russian: Лев Исаакович Лемке) (25 August 1931 – 4 August 1996, Saint Petersburg) was a Soviet and Russian actor, awarded the title Meritorious Artist of Russia.

Lemke finished his education in the Theatre School of Dnipropetrovsk in 1959, then worked in the New Moscow Theatre of Miniatures. In 1962 had started acting in the Leningrad Comedy Theatre and soon become the best actor there.

== Filmography ==
- 1994 - Sled chornoy ryby
- 1991 - Skandalnoe proishestvie
- 1991 - Dzhoker
- 1991 - Genius (Гений) as Prof. Nathanson
- 1991 - Rogonosets
- 1990 - Vrag naroda - Bukharin, a.k.a. Public Enemy Bukharin - Trotsky
- 1990 - Bluzhdayushie zvezdy - Sholom-Meer Muravchik
- 1990 - Anekdoty
- 1988 - Esperansa
- 1986 - Levsha, a.k.a. The Left-Hander (based on Nikolai Leskov's book)
- 1986 - Mikhailo Lomonosov (the third part: Vo slavu Otechestva)
- 1986 - Krasnaya strela
- 1985 - Podvig Odessy
- 1985 - V. Davydov i Goliaf
- 1984 - Aplodismenty, aplodismenty..., a.k.a. Applause, Applause...
- 1984 - Po shyuchiemu veleniyu
- 1981 - Opasnyj vozrast
- 1980 - Leningradtsy, deti moi...
- 1980 - Zhizn i priklyucheniya chetyrekh druzei - voices of animals
- 1979 - Troe v lodke ne schitaya sobaki
- 1978 - Zakhudaloe korolevstvo
- 1977 - Vtoraya popytka Viktora Krokhina, a.k.a. The Second Attempt of Viktor Krokhin
- 1977 - Zolotaya mina
- 1975 - Mark Tven protiv, a.k.a. Mark Twain Against
- 1975 - Polkovnik v otstavke
- 1974 - Tsarevich Prosha
- 1974 - Blokada, a.k.a. Blockade
- 1974 - Agoniya a.k.a. Agony, a.k.a. Agony: The Life and Death of Rasputin
- 1973 - Slomannaya podkova
- 1973 - Novye priklyucheniya Donni i Mikki
- 1972 - Poslednie dni Pompei
- 1972 - Dvenadtsat mesyatsev - the eastern ambassador
- 1971 - Krasnyj diplomat: stranitsy zhizni Leonida Krasina
- 1971 - Shutite?
- 1970 - Karnaval
- 1970 - Obratnoj dorogi net
- 1968 - An Old, Old Tale
- 1967 - Segodnya - novyj attraktsion
- 1967 - Dva bileta na dnevnoj seans, a.k.a. Two Tickets for a Daytime Picture Show
- 1966 - Segodnya - novyj attraktsion
- 1965 - Gorod masterov, a.k.a. The City of Masters - duke de Malicorne
- 1965 - Strah i otchayanie v Tretyej imperii (based on Bertolt Brecht's play)
- 1964 - Poezd miloserdiya
- 1963 - Krepostnaya aktrisa
- 1962 - Cheryomushki
