= The Andromeda Nebula =

The Andromeda Nebula (Туманность Андромеды)
- Directed by: Yevgeni Sherstobitov
- Written by: Ivan Yefremov (novel)
- Starring: Sergei Stolyarov; Vija Artmane; Nikolai Kryukov
- Cinematography: Nikolai Zhuravlyov
- Music by: Yakov Lapinsky
- Distributed by: Goskino
- Release date: 1967
- Running time: 77 minutes
- Country: Soviet Union
- Language: Russian

The Andromeda Nebula (Russian: «Туманность Андромеды») is a 1967 Soviet science fiction film starring Sergei Stolyarov and directed by Yevgeni Sherstobitov at the Dovzhenko Film Studios. The film was originally intended to be the first episode of a series of films, alternatively titled as The Andromeda Nebula: Episode I. Prisoners of the Iron Star. However, the remaining parts were never made. Officially, it was due to Stolyarov's death, but also because the trilogy's entire budget was spent on the first film and also because the society on the alien planet was seen as criticism of the Soviet Union.

The film is based upon the 1957 novel Andromeda Nebula by Ivan Yefremov. It follows the story of a group of humans on the spaceship Tantra tasked with investigating the home planet of an alien race. They discover that artificial radioactivity has killed almost all life on that planet. During the voyage home the ship is trapped by the gravitational force of an iron star and lands on a planet orbiting the star. Surrounded by predators who destroy human nervous system through space suits, the crew has to fight to see Earth again.

== Plot ==
The film begins with a ceremonial pledge of allegiance by a young man before a monument shaped like a torch. His mentor, Mven Mas, reflects on his own coming-of-age under the guidance of the legendary space commander Erg Noor. News arrives that the 37th space expedition has been completed, and the starship Tantra is returning to Earth, but an anomaly disrupts its journey. Commander Erg Noor awakens from stasis to find the ship caught by the gravity of an "iron star" and must make a perilous emergency deceleration. With its fuel depleted, the crew faces the grim reality that rescue from Earth could take decades. Meanwhile, back on Earth, the stressed manager of the interstellar communication network "The Great Ring," Dar Veter, considers resigning. His personal turmoil deepens as he maintains a complicated relationship with his partner, Veda Kong, who is torn between her loyalty to Veter and lingering feelings for her former lover, Erg Noor, aboard the endangered Tantra.

Orbiting the iron star, the crew of Tantra discovers two planets, one of which hosts an alien spacecraft resembling a spiral disc. With no other options, they decide to land and investigate, hoping to find resources to refuel their ship. This daring choice highlights the stark challenge of humanity's isolation in the cosmos, as the Great Ring broadcasts ancient messages from other civilizations—fascinating yet tragic, as the beings who sent them are long dead. On the planet's surface, the team encounters a hostile environment and remnants of a previous Earth expedition, the ill-fated Sail. The alien ship offers no solutions, and the crew faces mounting risks from a mysterious lifeform that thrives in the darkness, leading to the death of one member and the injury of another. Amid the chaos, Erg Noor wrestles with his emotions as he develops a deeper bond with his navigator, Niza Krit, who sacrifices herself to save him, sustaining a psychic injury that forces her into stasis.

Back on Earth, Veter transitions to a quieter life, taking up archaeological work alongside Veda Kong. However, the dream of uniting distant intelligent civilizations persists. Mven Mas leads a groundbreaking experiment to compress time and space, seeking to overcome the vast distances that separate humanity from other worlds. The arrival of Tantra after a perilous year brings renewed hope, as its survival represents both the resilience of the human spirit and the necessity of collaboration in facing cosmic challenges. The film closes with a coming-of-age ceremony for a new generation, symbolizing the ongoing cycle of exploration and the eternal quest to bridge the gulf between civilizations.

== Reception ==
The film was considered by some in the Soviet Union as being mildly pornographic at time of release and a review in the magazine of the Communist Party of Great Britain, Marxism Today, fifteen years later, noted the "Russian space tits controversy" as an example of "both increasing boundaries of the permissible as well as showing increased censorship in the early Brezhnev era".

The society on the alien planet was seen as criticism of the Soviet Union by Soviet authorities.

== Cast ==
Actor	Role
Sergei Stolyarov	Dar Veter
Vija Artmane	Veda Kong
Nikolai Kryukov	Erg Noor
Tatyana Voloshina	Niza Krit
Lado Tskhvariashvili	Mven Mas
Aleksandr Gaj	Pur Zhis
Roman Khomyatov	Kim
Lyudmila Chursina	Louma Lasvi
Marina Yurasova	Ingrid Ditra
Gennadi Yukhtin	Eon Tal
Alexander Goloborodko	Ren Boz
Valeriy Panarin	Holm

== General references ==
- Wingrove, David. Science Fiction Film Source Book (Longman Group Limited, 1985)
