= Tatyana Protsenko =

Soviet actress (1968–2021)

- Born: Tatyana Anatolyevna Protsenko; 8 April 1968; Moscow, USSR
- Died: 19 May 2021 (aged 53); Moscow, Russia
- Resting place: Pykhtinskoye Cemetery, Moscow, Russia
- Occupations: actress, journalist, poet
- Years active: 1974–1975 (as actress)

Tatyana Anatolyevna Protsenko (Russian: Татья́на Анато́льевна Проце́нко; 8 April 1968 – 19 May 2021) was a Soviet actress, best known for her role as Malvina in the 1975 film The Adventures of Buratino.

== Biography ==
Tatyana Protsenko was born on 8 April 1968 in Moscow, USSR. Her father was the chief of the documentary film directorate of Goskino USSR, and her mother was an air traffic controller at the Moscow international airport Vnukovo.

An assistant to film director Leonid Nechayev was looking for an actress to undertake the part of Malvina in a fairytale film, later to be released as The Adventures of Buratino. The assistant spotted the then five-year-old Tatyana on a train and invited her to take part in the casting. Tatyana agreed and was awarded the role after casting. The film was a huge success, and Tatyana quickly rose to nationwide fame.

Her participation in the film was so highly appreciated that Nechayev's next film, About the Little Red Riding Hood, was specifically designed to star Tatyana as the main character. However, Tatyana experienced trauma when she fell off a bicycle shortly before filming was set to begin, and the role was eventually assigned to another actress. Tatyana did not have another chance to appear in feature films. Later, she earned a degree from the Gerasimov Institute of Cinematography and worked at the Rolan Bykov Centre. She also became a member of the International Federation of Journalists. She wrote poems and published a book of her poetry.

Tatyana Protsenko died of cancer on May 19, 2021 in Moscow, after fighting the disease for three years. Although she only appeared in one film during her acting career, the news of her death was reported by major Russian mass media and spread across social media.

Tatyana Protsenko was survived by her husband and two children.
