= DiDuLa =

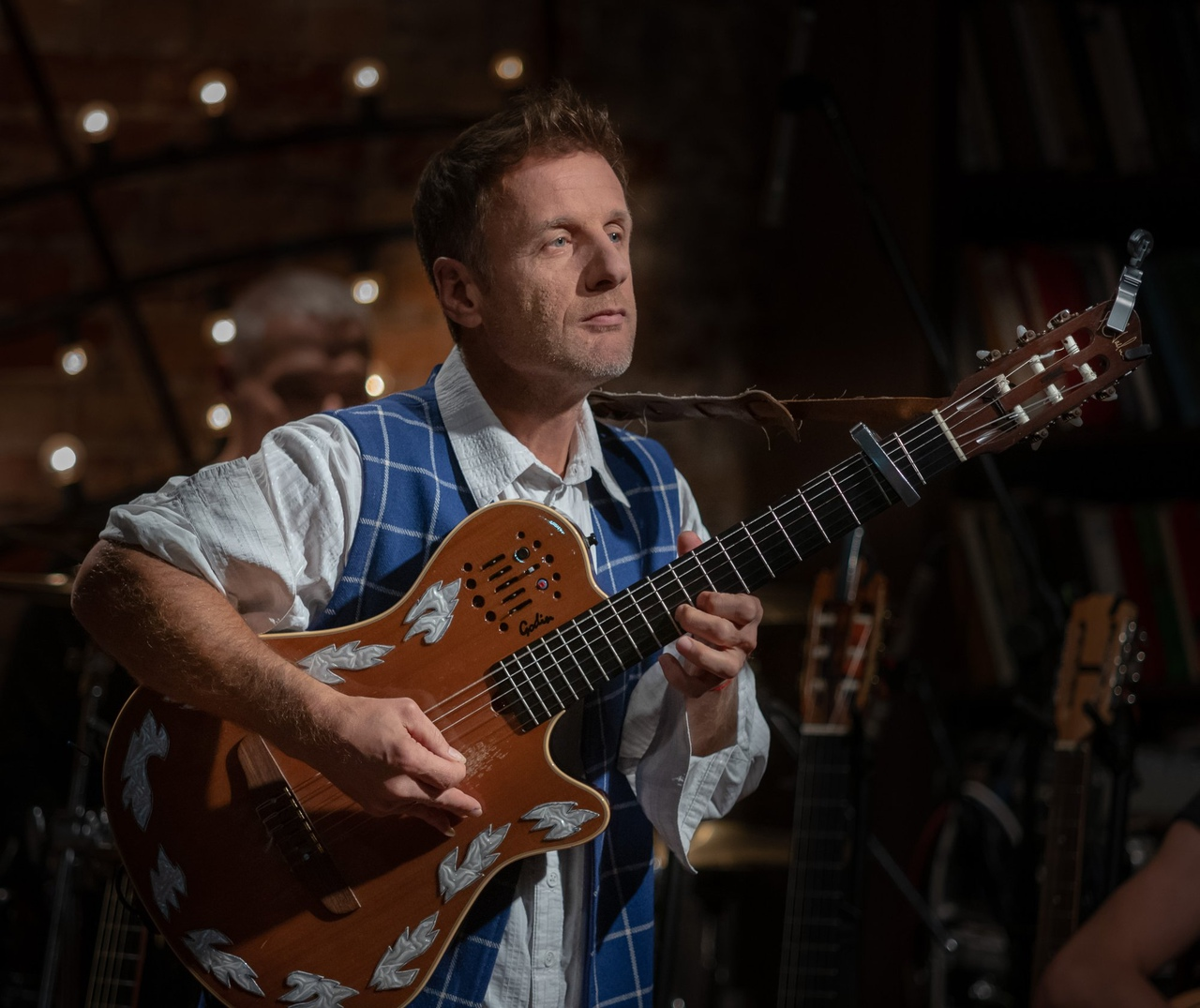
- DiDuLa in 2022

Background information
- Born: Valery Mikhailovich Didula; 24 January 1970 (age 56); Grodno, Byelorussian SSR, Soviet Union (present-day Belarus)
- Genres: Flamenco, folk, folk-pop, instrumental, new age, taarab
- Instruments: Acoustic guitar, acoustic-electric guitar, classical guitar, flamenco guitar, greek bouzouki, irish bouzouki, steel-string acoustic guitar
- Years active: 1989–present
- Labels: NOX, Artur, PMI, Kvadro-Disk, United
- Member of: DiDuLa (2002–present)
- Formerly of: The Scarlet Dawns (1989–1991); The White Dews (1991–????)
- Spouse(s): Leila Khamrabaeva (m. 2004 div. 2006); EVgenika (m. 2013 div. 2020)
- Awards: "Grand Prix" (2002) "White Elephant" (2010)
- Website: didula.com

Valery Mikhailovich Didula (Belarusian: Валерій Міхайловіч Дзідзюля — Romanized: Valeriy Mikhaylovich Dzidzyulya), better known by his stage name, DiDuLa, is a Soviet-Belarusian guitarist, bouzoukist, composer and producer. He is known as the founder of the Belarusian-Russian instrumental folk band, DiDuLa.

Didula grew up in Grodno, Belarus, and was fascinated by music from a young age. He learned how to play the guitar at the age of five, and wrote his first compositions at 16 years old. In 1989, Didula was recruited into a dance ensemble known as the Scarlet Dawns. He learned a lot about music production from his mentor Nikolai Khitrik, composer of the Scarlet Dawns.

After the Scarlet Dawns' disbandment in 1991, Didula was recruited into the White Dews, another dance ensemble with influences from mostly Polish, Belarusian, Ukrainian and Gypsy folk music and dance. As part of this ensemble, Didula first went on tour in Europe, visiting countries such as Spain, Italy, Poland, Switzerland, France, Germany. In Spain, he became acquainted with the flamenco genre.

After the disbandment of the White Dews, DiDuLa went on to work on his solo career. Having created instrumental hits such as "Flamenco," "Isadora," "Arabica," "Leila," and "Flight to Mercury," he gained a huge fanbase. In August 2002, DiDuLa formed the band named after his surname, and went on to create hits such as "Legend", "The Path Home", "Cave Town of Inkerman", "Train to Barcelona" and "Colorful Dreams".

== Early life (1970–1989) ==
=== Childhood ===
Didula was born on 24 January 1970, in Grodno, Belarus, to Mikhail and Galina Didula, both connoisseurs of music. His father, Mikhail, was a highly skilled mechanic, and his mother, Galina, was an accountant. At the age of five, Galina gifted Didula his first guitar as a birthday present, and he was hooked on it from then on. Like any child, Didula had all sorts of record players as a child, which also had a strong influence on him. His first guitar also marked the beginning of his experiments with sound. He attached a pickup to the guitar, used homemade amplifiers, and devised all sorts of devices.

"When I was five, my mother gave me a guitar. My first impressions, of course, were very memorable: a big, beautiful toy, shiny, with taut strings." Didula states in an interview, "Later, as an adult, I realized it was a wonderful instrument, capable of bringing both joy and sorrow. You need to talk to a guitar, and it will tell you a lot. Today, the guitar is a whole world for me. Music defies words; it's difficult to talk about. It's a way of self-expression, my alter ego, an instrument with its own character, its own surprises, its own pros and cons. Between me and the guitar lies a small, but incredibly interesting life."

=== Adolescense ===
Around the age of 14 or 15 his passion for the guitar grew into a conscious need, and the instrument became an integral part of his life. At 16, he wrote his first compositions. Didula began his guitar lessons, the teacher taught him different chords and the various playing styles and techniques. This was the beginning, the first steps in mastering the guitar. Didula and his friends, all guitar enthusiasts, constantly competed with each other, which continually pushed them to improve their skills. Didula and his friends also attended concerts and weddings to see guitarists play. He later got employed for a job at the Radiopribor plant the same year.

== Career ==
=== The Scarlet Dawns and the White Dews ===
Didyulya's professional guitar career began around 1989, when he played as the third guitarist in the vocal and dance ensemble, the Scarlet Dawns. The Scarlet Dawns performed on state farms, collective farms, and concert halls. Nikolai Khitrik, the composer of the Scarlet Dawns, described by Didula as his "mentor", provided him with much experience with music production. During the process, several people quit, after which the performances continued at a local cooperative restaurant. It was an incredible experience, six hours of playing every evening, seven days a week, and having breaks were rare. A wide variety of music was played throughout the process. Didula also earned his first paychecks, which he was very proud of, as earning money doing what he loves is everyone's dream.

After the disbandment of the Scarlet Dawns in 1991, Didulya joined the White Dews, another dance ensemble in Belarus. The ensemble was large and flexible, and Didula worked as a sound engineer. The composer of the White Dews, Yevgeny Alexandrovich Shtop, taught Didula a lot about how to produce sound, the sound of different instruments, and how the audience perceives a particular number. Didula toured with the White Dews throughout Europe, visiting countries such as Spain, Italy, Poland, Switzerland, France, Germany. He was fascinated by the diversity and music of these different European cultures, he especially claims to have been "infected" with flamenco, the traditional Spanish genre of music. "Who knows what style I would be working in now if I hadn't once been fortunate enough to visit Spain. The sound of a classical Spanish nylon-string instrument and the amazing sound of wood was mesmerizing." Didula stated in an interview, "My blood boiled and my pulse quickened when I heard Spanish music. It was this music that opened its passionate embrace to me, captivated me with its freedom-loving nature, and infected me with the rhythm of flamenco. This style is my now calling card today."

=== Solo career ===
==== 1991–1998 ====
After the disbandment of the White Dews, Didula went on to work on his solo career, working with his former band members Vladimir Zakharov (guitarist) and Dmitry Kurakulov (choreographer). Some time later, Didula heard about a music competition on Belarusian television that invited young musicians. He decided to give it a try. If a musician made it through the qualifying round, a future was in store. Didula, Kurakulov, and Zakharov took their equipment and traveled to Gdańsk, Poland, where the competition was being held. After passing the qualifying round, the trio went on to pass through the next round, eventually performing at the gala concert. This was Didula's first major success, his dream of reaching a large audience came true. There, he met professional directors and editors who assisted him, shared their experiences, and offered advice on his aspirations and direction. It was on this day that Didula met his other mentor, honored Belarusian composer Oleg Eliseenkov, who played a crucial role in his advancement in the competition.

Thanks to his resounding success, Didula became a professional solo guitarist. Didula later moved to Minsk, where he found a job as a sales consultant at entrepreneur and pianist Igor Bruskin's music store. His acquaintance with Bruskin allowed Didula to gain significant experience interacting and collaborating with recording studios, concert halls, and other musical organizations. Later on, a program for the 1998 Slavic Bazaar festival in Vitbesk invited all the musicians who had passed in the competition Didula competed in. The festival performance at the Slavic Bazaar was broadcast on television throughout the CIS, the Baltic countries, Poland, and Bulgaria. The festival inspired Didula to pursue a solo career. After the Slavic Bazaar festival, Didula bid farewell to Igor Bruskin and moved to Moscow, Russia that same year. Didula was intimidated how culturally different Russia was from Belarus. Nevertheless, he believed in success and overcoming difficulties. Didula staged street performances on Arbat Street of his own free will.

==== 1999–2001 ====
Didula met Sergey Kulishenko, who worked a well-paid commercial job. Kulishenko wanted to learn to play the guitar, and Didula taught his first student. Kulishenko also showed interest in Didula's studies, helped with housing and instruments, and booked his first professional recording at guitarist Mei Lian's studio. This high-quality recording studio determined the direction of Didula's future work. Eight compositions were recorded at Mei Lian's studio, all of them were to be included on Didula's new album. Didula clearly remembers working with Mei Lian—a talented guitarist and composer, a good teacher, and a respected friend. Together with Kulishenko, Didula began exploring the possibility of creating his own home recording studio and researched the music equipment market.

Didula's team met Sergey Migachev, a sound producer working for Samara musician and singer, Arkady Motov, who was well-versed in music, analog technology, and modern computers. After a year of intense collaboration, with the support of Kulishenko and Migachev, Didula recorded and released their debut album, Flamenco. When Didula tried to sign with major Russian record labels, they all turned him down, claiming that the instrumental genre was "uninteresting" for Russia. The lack of financial resources to widely distribute Didula's music left Didula's company in a bind and undermined the band's morale. At one of his club concerts, Didula met Sergey Baldin, who suggested that Didula and his team arrange a meeting with representatives working for Monolit Records to discuss collaboration. After listening to the material, Monolit's management, after much deliberation, declined. In spite of the failure of his collaboration with Monolit, Baldin's faith inspired Didula to continue playing and focus on club performances. By performing and analyzing what the audience liked best, Didula was able to improve his album and create new, interesting sounds on the guitar. At one of his concerts, employees of Global Music met with Didula and invited him to a meeting. Global Music expressed interest in the project and agreed to collaborate. A first contract was signed with Didula, but for unknown reasons, the company remained inactive. The project reached a dead end, and Didula terminated his contract with Global Music.

Despite the failure of his collaboration with Monolit and Global, six months of collaboration bore fruit. Didula met his current concert director, Timur Salikhov, with whom he works with to this day. Some time later, Didula received a call from the Russian Studio, offering to include one of his compositions in a compilation. At the office where the meeting was scheduled, Didula spoke with Iosif Prigozhin, a specialist at the Russian Studio. Prigozhin explained that he was creating a new label, NOX Music, was interested in new projects, and would like to collaborate with Didula. Didula immediately agreed, and a new contract was signed with NOX. Didula finally re-released Flamenco in July 2000, which was promoted by NOX. A music video for the song "Isadora" was filmed and directed by Guria Atneva, with Ruslana Gerasemenkova serving as the camera operator. Another music video for the song "Flamenco" was filmed with Alla Dukhova, and her ballet group Todes dancing in the video. Didula's music videos began airing on television, and he himself appeared on Dmitry Dibrov's TV show Anthropology, where he performed, chatted, and presented the album to viewers. Afterward, album sales soared. Didula began a joint club concert tour with Migachev's boss, Samara musician and singer Arkady Motov. "Spanish music has had a huge influence on my work," Didula explained, "as I lived in Spain for quite a while and observed firsthand how local musicians worked in pubs, bars, and restaurants. Now I incorporate some of this into my performances."

==== 2002–2006 ====
Didula met film director, Andrei Konchalovsky, and starred in his film House of Fools (2002) as the guitarist and partner of Canadian singer, songwriter, and musician Bryan Adams, who acted as himself in the film. House of Fools won the Grand Prix at the 2002 Venice Film Festival. That same year, Didula released his second studio album, The Road to Baghdad, which was produced by Migachev and promoted by NOX. Two new music videos for "Arabica" and "Leila" were directed and filmed by Alexandra Igudina. Didula worked as a composer, arranger, and producer, recording several songs with renowned Spanish singer Plácido Domingo, Bryan Adams, and Syrian-Russian singer Avraam Russo. On Didula's own album, The Road to Baghdad, Russo provided vocals in "Leila" and appeared in its music video. Didula also helped produce Russo's own songs, "Amor," "Baila que Baila," and "Quiereme." That same year, Didula, along with Sergey Sorokin, assisted Russian-Lithuanian singer Kristina Orbakaitė on recorded her song "Rio de Janeiro". His touring activities expand, reaching new cities and clubs. During the tours, he acquired new instruments, expenses, and ideas, which positively impacted his creativity. In August 2002, DiDuLa formed his band named after him. Initially composed of Yaroslav Oboldin (bassist), Kirill Rossolimo and Gamlet Farzaliyev (percussionists), Alexander Leonov (keyboardist), and Boris Solodovnikov (sound engineer). In 2003, Didula and renowned pianist, Dmitry Malikov, collaborated and released the composition "Satin Shores", which became the lead single for DiDuLa's first compilation album, The Best: Satin Shores. On 9 September 2003, DiDuLa performed their first concert at the Central House of Artists in Moscow, Russia. The band performed Didula's compositions from Flamenco and The Road to Baghdad, and new compositions that would later be released on their new album, Legend. The concert was directed by Timur Salikhov, managed by Boris Zeitlin, and recorded by Sergey Kulishenko, Sergey Vasilievsky, and Max Mostovik. In 2004, DiDuLa recorded and released their first album together, Legend, which included the fan-favorite composition "The Way Home". That same year, the band performed a major concert at the Oktyarbsky Concert Hall in Saint-Petersburg, with its usual 4,000-capacity overflowing with fans.

DiDuLa later performed their biggest concert yet at the Rossiya State Central Concert Hall in Moscow on 7 April 2005. The band released a live album CD for the concert on 25 May 2006. A DVD for the concert was also released. That same year, the band recorded and released two new studio albums, "Cave Town of Inkerman" and "Colorful Dreams", and a compilation, "Grand Collection" (released before "Colorful Dreams"). Finally, a box set of all DiDuLa's studio albums and live album was released. 2006 turned out to be a very fruitful year for the band. Later on, Russian singer, Zoya Ledava, recorded a higher-pitched version of "Cave Town of Inkerman" with her vocals sang over it.

==== 2007–2014 ====
DiDuLa released another studio album in 2007, Music of the Never-Shot Cinema. He performed "Dolphins" alongside Dmitry Malikov in his program, "Pianomania", that same year. Didula also assisted Belarusian composer and guitarist, Denis Asimovich, in recording his album Hommage to Cheslav Drozdevich, and it was thanks to his participation that the recording of "Dedication to Cheslav Drozdevich" was completed in 2008 shortly before Denis Asimovich's death that same year. Later on, DiDuLa released their documentary-musical film The Road of Six Strings, documenting the history of the band. Sometime in 2009, DiDuLa performed a major concert at the Oktyabrsky Concert Hall, Uzbek rhythmic gymnast, Zarina Mukhitdinova, appeared as a guest dancer for the performance of "Colorful Dreams".

On 4 March 2010, DiDuLa released their seventh studio album, Aroma. On 2 December 2010, DiDuLa performed at a grand concert at the State Kremlin Palace in Moscow. Thirty compositions were performed and it lasted approximately three hours, the concert also featured renowned Siberian composer, Li Otta's OTTA Orchestra. After the concert, DiDuLa and the OTTA Orchestra toured together throughout 2011. On 8 December 2011, DiDuLa performed at another grand concert at the State Kremlin Palace. Unlike the previous Kremlin concert, fewer compositions were performed. The OTTA Orchestra performed alongside the band again. After this performance, a friend of DiDuLa's met a woman named Evgenia Kostennikova, whom he started dating.

On 6 December 2012, DiDuLa released their eighth album Ornamental, featuring compositions initially performed with the OTTA Orchestra at the Kremlin concerts. That same year, Didula assisted Igor Dedusenko on producing his album Prayer (2012). From 2012 to 2013, Didula toured the United States, performing in cities such as Miami and New York. In 2013, the compilation album One Day Today was released. Didula and Kostennikova married in 2013, and gave birth to a daughter named Arina around 2015. In 2014, DiDuLa collaborated with Australian pop singer, Max Lawrence, on a song titled "Now You're Gone". They applied to have song appear in Eurovision, which was supported by the Belarusian public. Although the Belarusian public (including their president) wanted DiDuLa and Lawrence to represent their country at Eurovision, Belarus was ultimately represented by another singer, Teo.

==== 2015–2019 ====
Didula's wife, Evgenia Kostennikova, now going by the stage name, EVgenika, began performing with her husband in 2015. Throughout 2016, EVgenika performed with the band in clubs such as Jagger, Red, and Volta. Didula also assisted EVgenika in producing her debut self-titled studio album that same year.

==== COVID Era ====
TBA

==== 2023–2026 ====
TBA

== Awards ==
- Grand Prix (2002) at the 2002 Venice Film Festival for Andrei Konchalovsky's movie, House of Fools (2002).
- White Elephant (2010) for Alexei Balbanov's movie, A Stoker (2010).

== DiDuLa lineup ==
=== Musicians ===
==== Current members ====
- Valery Didula – guitar, bouzouki (2002–PRESENT)
- Valery Skladanny – woodwinds, saxophone (2007–PRESENT)
- Vitaly Barmenkov – bass guitar, classical bass (2020–PRESENT)
- Vasily Koloda – percussion, drums, hand drums (2020–PRESENT)
- Ivan Aksenov – keyboards (2023–PRESENT)
- Mikhail Drumberg – percussion, drum kit, cajon (2023–PRESENT)
- Yekaterina Smirnova – violin (2020–PRESENT)
- Araksia Kirakosyan – viola (2020–PRESENT)
- Lidiya Shabalina – cello (2020–PRESENT)

==== Past members ====
- Yaroslav Oboldin – bass guitar (2002–2010)
- Artem Lapin – bass guitar (2011–2013)
- Philip Borodin – bass guitar, classical bass (2014–2019)
- Alexander Leonov – keyboards (2002–2006)
- Alex Astero – keyboards (2007–2010)
- Khaibula Magomedov – keyboards, piano (2010–2022)
- Kirill Rossolimo – hand drums, cajon, darbuka (2002–2003)
- Gamlet Farzaliyev – drum kit, percussion (2002–2003)
- J. Zair Omer – hand drums, cajon, darbuka (2004–2005)
- Andrei Atabekov – drum kit, cajon, djembe (2004–2010)
- Alexander Sazonov – drum kit, cajon, darbuka (2006)
- Rustem Bari – hand drums, darbuka, djembe (2006–2019)
- Alexander Leer – percussion, drum kit, cajon (2010–2019)
- Ramil Mulikov – brass, trumpet, trombone (2011–2019)
- Aliyah Kurbanova – dancer (2003–2005)
- Karina Bagmadzhyan – dancer (2003–2004 & 2007–2008)
- Natalia Riabchenko – dancer (2004–2006)
- Amira – dancer (2006)
- Natalia Vorontsova – dancer (2009)

=== Technicians ===
- Timur Salikhov – tour manager (2002–PRESENT)
- Sergei Migachev – producer (2002–2009)
- Max Velocity – montage director (2003)
- Victor Vasilyev – montage director (2008)
- Boris Solodovnikov – sound engineer (2002–2005)
- Raisa Struk – sound engineer (2006)
- Marina Vydshedko – sound engineer (2006)
- Sergei Sapogov – producer (2008)
- Artem Temnikov – director (2008)
- Denis Golikov (2009)
- Irina Privalova – operator, camerawoman (2008–2011)
- Grigoriy Rudko – operator (2008)
- Alexei Lapyshev – operator (2008)
- Ruslan Makletsov – lighting engineer (2013–PRESENT)
- Alexander Ivankov – sound engineer (2020–PRESENT)
- Alexander Radchenko – lighting engineer
- Igor Pravorotsky – legal support
- Ilya Atabekov – assistant tour manager

== Discography ==
=== Studio albums ===
- Flamenco (2000)
- The Road to Baghdad (2002)
- Legend (2004)
- Cave Town of Inkerman (2006)
- Colorful Dreams (2006)
- Music of the Never-Shot Cinema (2007)
- Aroma (2010)
- Ornamental (2012)
- Aquamarine (with Chris Wonderful) (2017)
- The Seventh Sense (2019)
- 2021 (2021)
- Seasons (2025)

=== Live albums ===
- Live in Moscow (2006)
- Live in St. Petersburg (2009)
- Live in Kremlin (2013)
- Live with String Quartet (2022)

=== Compilations ===
- The Best: Satin Shores (2003)
- Grand Collection (2006)
- One Day Today (2013)

=== Singles ===
- "Flamenco" (2000)
- "Isadora" (2000)
- "Rumba" (2000)
- "Spain" (2001)
- "Fandango" (2001)
- "Arabica" (2002)
- "Leila" (2002)
- "With the Flow" (2002)
- "The Road to Baghdad" (2003)
- "Flight to Mercury" (2003)
- "Satin Shores (feat. Dmitry Malikov)" (2003)
- "Legend" (2004)
- "Street Passions" (2004)
- "Autumn-August" (2004)
- "The Path Home" (2005)
- "Light Breeze" (2005)
- "Vinyl" (2005)
- "Cave Town of Inkerman" (2006)
- "Train to Barcelona" (2006)
- "In Exile" (2006)
- "Colorful Dreams" (2006)
- "Parcel from Romania" (2007)
- "Circle Dance" (2007)
- "Alegria" (2007)
- "Toro-ko-ko, pek-pek" (2008)
- "One Day in September" (2010)
- "At Dawn" (2010)
- "Farewell Surface!" (2010)
- "Chapiteau (feat. OTTA Orchestra)" (2011)
- "Greek (feat. OTTA Orchestra)" (2011)
- "Music of the Sun" (2011)
- "Serbian" (2012)
- "Hunting for a Wolf" (2013)
- "Dream" (2013)
- "Voice of the Spheres" (2013)
- "Lullaby" (2013)
- "Letter Without a Reply" (2013)
- "On the Other Side of the Rain" (2014)
- "Now You're Gone (feat. Max Lawrence)" (2014)
- "Silk Ribbon" with Chris Wonderful (2017)
- "White Month" with Chris Wonderful (2018)
- "Butterflies" (2019)
- "Kissed (feat. Buranovskiye Babushki)" (2019)
- "Butterfly Connoisseur" (2019)
- "I'll Be There" (2021)
- "Two Sisters" (2021)
- "Skladuk" / "Beach" (2023)
- "Ball" (2023)
- "Sea Caves (feat. Sergey Sorotin)" / "Galatea" (2023)
- "Fair" (2023)
- "In the Reflection" (2024)
- "Morning at Loch-Ness" (2024)
- "Path to the Light" (2024)
- "Sacred Beauty" (2025)
- "Worldly Candle" (2025)
- "Eyelashes of December" (2025)
- "Note of Hope" (2026)

=== Music videos ===
- "Flamenco"
- "Isadora"
- "Rumba"
- "Spain"
- "Arabica"
- "Leila" (feat. Avraam Russo)
- "Cave Town of Inkerman"
- "Train to Barcelona"
- "On the Threshold"
- "Cave Town of Inkerman (feat. Zoya Ledava)"
- "Chapiteau"
- "In the Reflection"
- "Path to the Light"
- "Note of Hope"

=== Production work ===
- Hommage to Cheslav Drozdievich by Denis Asimovich (2008)
- Prayer by Igor Dedusenko (2012)

=== Movies ===
- House of Fools (2002)
- The Road of Six Strings (2008)
- A Stoker (2010)
