= Russian language in Azerbaijan =

Russian is the first language of more than 150,000 people in Azerbaijan, predominantly ethnic Russians, as well as of Russified Azeris, Ukrainians, Jews, and other minorities. In 1994, 38% of Azerbaijanis spoke Russian fluently as a second language.

== History ==
Russian was introduced to the South Caucasus following its colonisation in the first half of the nineteenth century after Qajar Iran was forced to cede its Caucasian territories per the Treaty of Gulistan and Treaty of Turkmenchay in 1813 and 1828 respectively to Russia. By 1830 there were schools with Russian as the language of instruction in the cities of Shusha, Baku, Elisabethpol, and Shamakhi; later such schools were established in Quba, Ordubad, and Zagatala. Education in Russian was unpopular among ethnic Azeris until 1887, when Habib bey Mahmudbeyov and Sultan Majid Ganizadeh founded the first Russian-Azeri school in Baku. A secular school with instruction in both Russian and Azeri, its programs were designed to be consistent with cultural values and traditions of the Muslim population. Eventually 240 such schools for both boys and girls, including a women's college founded in 1901, were established prior to the "Sovietization" of the South Caucasus. The first Russian-Azeri reference library opened in 1894. In 1918, during the short period of the Azerbaijan's independence, the government declared Azeri the official language, but the use of Russian in government documents was permitted until all civil servants mastered the official language.

In the Soviet era, the large Russian population of Baku, the quality and prospects of education in Russian, increased access to Russian literature, and other factors contributed to the intensive Russification of the Baku's population. Its direct result by the mid-twentieth century was the formation of a supra-ethnic urban Baku subculture, uniting people of Russian, Azerbaijani, Armenian, Jewish, and other origins and whose special features were being cosmopolitan and Russian-speaking. The widespread use of Russian resulted in a phenomenon of 'Russian-speaking Azeris', i.e. an emergence of an urban community of Azerbaijani-born ethnic Azeris who considered Russian their native language. In 1970, 57,500 Azeris (1.3%) identified Russian as their native language.

=== Russian-language Azerbaijani literature ===
The first works by Azerbaijani authors in Russian were published in the nineteenth century. In 1883 Ahmad bey Javanshir wrote a historical sketch in Russian entitled "On the Political status of Karabakh Khanate between 1745-1805."

Ismayil bey Gutgashynly and Yusif Vazir Chamanzaminli published original works in Russian in the years before the October Revolution. The great propagator of the Russian language among the Azeri population was playwright Mirza Fatali Akhundov, founder of Azeri dramaturgy.

Russian-language Azeri literature continued to develop throughout the Soviet era. Its outstanding representatives are Imran Gasimov, Hasan Seyidbayli, Magsud and Rustam Ibragimbekovs, Natig Rasulzadeh, Alla Akhundova and Chingiz Abdullayev among others.

In 2003, Russian-Azerbaijani writers "Ray" and the Moscow branch of the Writers Union of Azerbaijan was established. In 2004, an association of writers and poets called Commonwealth of Literature was founded.

== Russian in the arts ==
Since the second half of the nineteenth century, Russian folk and pop songs have appeared in repertoires of Bulbuljan, Muslim Magomayev, Rashid Behbudov Polad Bülbüloğlu, Zeynab Khanlarova, Flora Karimova, the Qaya group and many others. Even after independence from the Soviet Union Azerbaijani singers such as Brilliant Dadashova and Aygun Kazimova have continued to write and perform songs in Russian.

During the Soviet era, Azerbaijanfilm produced dozens of feature-length and documentary films in Russian, including famous films like The Telephone, Don't Worry, I'm With You, Asif, Vasif, Aghasif and Exam. Films in Russian continue to be produced in Azerbaijan in the post-Soviet era.

== Russian today ==
Outside of the capital, the use of Russian sharply declined after the collapse of the Soviet Union. Similarly, the Russian-speaking subculture in Baku experienced strong decline due to emigration of a large numbers of Russians. Nevertheless, the Russian language continues to feature prominently in the daily life of people in Baku. As in the Soviet times, today the use of Russian in Azerbaijan is concentrated among the intellectuals and "élite" of the nation, however, a survey conducted by the Eurasia Heritage Foundation ranked Azerbaijan among former Soviet republics with the worst level of knowledge of Russian, along with Armenia, Georgia, Lithuania, and Tajikistan.

In 2002, President Heydar Aliyev issued a decree establishing Azerbaijani as the sole language of state operation. Shop signs, forms, and stamps in Russian were replaced with Azeri ones. At the same time compulsory teaching of Russian in schools was made optional.

In 2007, by decree of the National Broadcasting Council, live broadcasting of Russian TV channels ceased. Officially, this action was undertaken to protect Azerbaijan's national frequencies, which were declared a "national treasure of the country," from the influence of foreign media. It was rumored however, that the main reason was to eliminate the alleged pro-Armenian orientation of Russian TV channels covering the conflict in Nagorno-Karabakh.

In 2008, the government banned foreign language broadcasts on Azerbaijani television and radio channels, except for a daily newscast in Russian. This measure faced strong opposition from the media and public. Dissenters argued that Azerbaijan still has a large Russian-speaking community, pointing to the success of some Russian-language television shows. Ultimately an exception was made for certain Russian broadcast, but Azeri subtitles were made required.

Despite the significantly strengthened position of the Azerbaijani language in the post-Soviet era, several Russian language newspapers continue to be published in Baku. The Association of Russian Writers is still operating in the country.

== Features of Russian in Azerbaijan ==
The Russian vernacular spoken in Azerbaijan (the Azerbaijani dialect) differs from standard Russian due to the influence of the Azeri spoken throughout the country. At the phonetic level, this influence can be seen specifically in the initial lengthening of vowels, a sharp rise in intonation at the end of a question, and the use of the voiced palato-alveolar affricate. On the lexical level, a number of predominantly slang terms of both Azeri and Russian origin are gradually penetrating into print media.

== Education ==
There are more than 300 schools across the country, including 18 local high schools and 38 secondary specialized schools that provide instruction in Russian.

On 13 June 2000, Baku Slavic University was founded in Baku, Azerbaijan on the basis of the Akhundov Pedagogical Institute of Russian Language and Literature.

On November 24, 2009, Azerbaijan became the first ex-Soviet country to open the Russian Book House store. The opening ceremony was attended by the head of the Presidential Administration of Russia Sergei Naryshkin.
