= Iosif Prigozhin =

Russian music producer

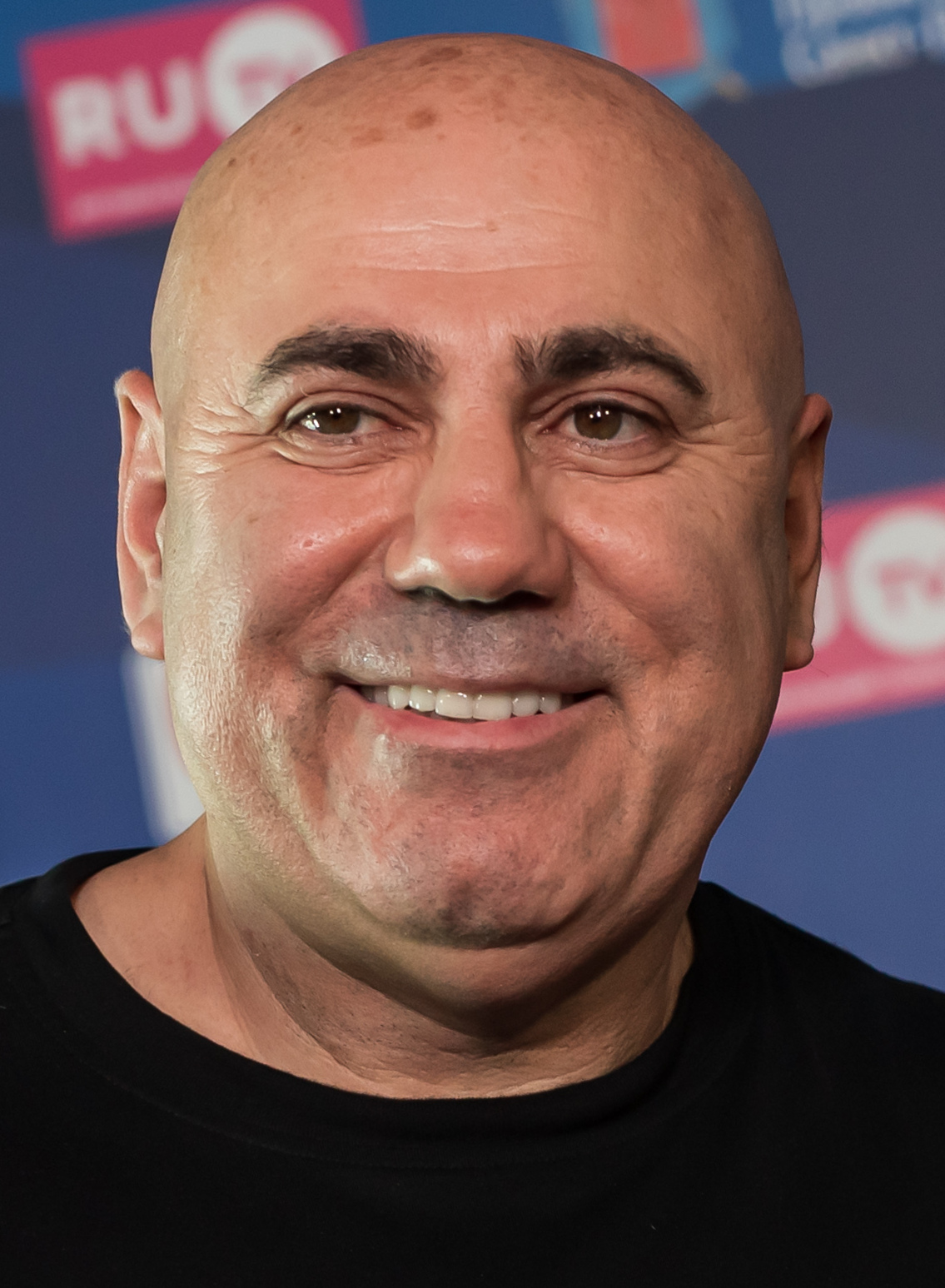
- Born: Iosif Igorevich Prigozhin; 2 April 1969 (age 57); Makhachkala, Dagestan ASSR, Russian SFSR, USSR
- Occupations: Tv producer, music producer

Iosif Igorevich Prigozhin (born 2 April 1969) is а Russian music producer. He has produced for the singers Valeria, Natalia Vetlitskaya, Vakhtang Kikabidze, Nikolai Noskov, Aleksandr Marshal, Avraam Russo, Kristina Orbakaitė, Didulya and many others. He is the creator of the record label NOX Music has organized various Russian music festivals, concerts, and television programs.

== Biography ==
Iosif Igorevich Prigozhin was born on 2 April 1969 in Makhachkala to Igor Matveevich Prigozhin (1938–1990) and Dinara Yakubovna Prigozhina (born 1940). He is of half Ashkenazi and half Mountain Jewish ethnic origin. He began working as a hairdresser at the age of 12. At the age of 16 he arrived in Moscow. In 1986, he graduated from the Moscow evening school No. 87 on Izmailovsky Boulevard. Не took classes at the Gamma Theatrical Studio. In 1994, he entered the Lunacharsky State Institute for Theatre Arts (GITIS). Without leaving his intensive creative and administrative activities, he graduated from the Institute in 2000, having specialized in "drama managing."

From 1987 to 1990, Prigozhin worked as a tour manager for concert programs. At the same time he sang on stage and released an audiocassette with recordings of his own songs. He started his active tour life in 1988. Since then he has organized more than 1,500 concerts with pop stars throughout the former Soviet Union. In 1989, Prigozhin was an administrator and organizer of the first fashion show by Valentin Yudashkin in the Moscow Variety Theatre. Prigozhin's debut as a producer took place in 1991, when the TV programs he produced Super Show-1991 and Club T were broadcast on the channel Ostankino. In 1992, he became a producer of the singer Sona. In the same year, he produced the musical show dedicated to the European Motoball Championship in the town of Vidnoye.

In 1993, he founded the "Father's Home" Foundation, which he headed until 1995. The members of the Board of Trustees included Archbishop Sergiy of Solnechnogorsk, Grand Mufti of Russia Ravil Gainutdin, Chief Rabbi of Russia Adolf Shayevich, the artists Tikhon Khrennikov, Alexandra Pakhmutova, Iosif Kobzon, Lyudmila Zykina, Makhmud Esambayev, and others. The charitable foundation helped socially unprotected groups of the Russian population, attracted public attention to the situation of refugees from neighboring countries and internally displaced persons. In 1996, Prigozhin was the producer of the concert dedicated to the Independence Day of Georgia, as well as the anniversary concerts dedicated to the 50th anniversary of creative endeavors of Lyudmila Zykina and the 10th anniversary of the group A-Studio, the first solo concerts of Tatiana Bulanova in the Variety Theatre, and the Golden Gramophone Awards (1996–1998). He was the executive producer of the gala concert dedicated to the third anniversary of the ORT Channel (1998) and the gala concert in honor of the celebration of International Women's Day (1999). In May 1999, he was the producer of the groundbreaking ceremony of the star of the people's artist Georgy Kikabidze on Stars Square in honor of the artist's 60th birthday.

He created one of the largest Russian audio companies, ORT-Records. From June 1997 to July 1999, Iosif Prigozhin was the general producer of the company, and from March 1998 to June 1999, he was its director general. At the end of 1998, ORT-Records was awarded the Ovation National Musical Award for the category "Best Record Company". Within a few months of work, ORT-Records released albums by Iosif Kobzon, Lev Leshchenko, Vakhtang Kikabidze, Alexander Marshal, Nikolai Noskov, Kris Kelmi, the bands A'Studio, Na-Na, Splin, Bozhya Korovka, Otpetiye Moshenniki, Shao-Bao!, 2x2, Masha Rasputina, Alexey Glyzin, Yevgeny Osin, Valery Didula, Valery Syutkin, Alexander Serov, and Alena Sviridova. In 1998, it was awarded the Ovation Award as the best producer of the year. The same year, the magazine Company recognized Prigozhin as the best businessman of the year in the field of show business.

On 1 June 2000, Iosif Prigozhin created the record label NOX Music (National United Cultural Community). As the head of the NOX Music, he was responsible for the production and release of albums of Russian artists, presentations of albums, and organizing concerts in large concert venues. Artists such as Alyona Sviridova, Natalia Vlasova, the guitarist DiDulya, Alexander Marshal, Vakhtang Kikabidze, Nikolai Noskov, Kristina Orbakaite, Phillip Kirkorov, the bands Gorky Park, Korol i Shut, Vosmoye Marta, Dyuna, A-Studio, Kvartal, Masha Rasputina, Pascal, Lika Star, Yevgeny Osin, Avraam Russo, Andrei Makarevich, Victoria Morozova, Alexander Serov, Alexey Glyzin, Valery Syutkin have collaborated with Iosif Prigozhin. The main artist representing NOX Music became the singer Valeria, who signed a contract with Prigozhin on 7 April 2003.

On the night of 24 November 2002, Prigozhin Mercedes 220 automobile was blown up on Tverskaya Street in Moscow. No one was injured in the explosion.

In 2004, he became General Director of the Russian record label REAL Records. In 2007 he became the producer and mastermind of the program "You are a Superstar!" on the channel "NTV".

On 23 March 2011, the couple visited Ksenia Kiselyova who's seriously ill with two types of blood cancer in the city of Perm, and on the same day Valery gave a concert in honor of the girl. After that, the citizens of Perm as part of a charity venture "Let's Santa!" raised around 12 million rubles for the treatment of the girl. On 11 March 2014, Iosif Prigozhin signed the appeal of cultural figures of the Russian Federation in support of the policies of the Russian President Vladimir Putin for the annexation of Crimea and war in Ukraine.

=== 2023 scandal ===
On March 25, 2023, a 35-minute audio recording of a conversation between, presumably, Prigozhin and Farkhad Akhmedov, was widely circulated in the media and caused a public outcry. In the recording, both interlocutors criticize the leadership of Russia in obscene form. On March 26, Prigozhin made a statement that the recording was a “fake” using neural networks, but later said that “some moments” in the conversation were real.

== Awards ==
Since 1994, Prigozhin has been a member of the Association of Music Producers and Doctor of Arts of the Academy of Alternative Sciences. In 1998, he was awarded with the "Ovation" Award as the "Producer of the Year". The same year, the magazine Company declared him "The Best Businessman" in the field of show business.

== Sanctions ==
In August 2015, the Security Service of Ukraine included Prigozhin in its list of cultural figures "whose actions pose a threat to the national security of Ukraine."

On 7 January 2023, against the backdrop of Russia's invasion of Ukraine, he was included in the sanctions list of Ukraine because Prigozhin "spreads narratives in accordance with Kremlin propaganda in order to justify Russia's actions." Earlier, Prigozhin was included in the NGO Anti-Corruption Foundation's list of "corrupt officials and warmongers" for his public support for the actions of the Russian army in Ukraine.

On 20 July 2023, together with his wife Valeriya Perfilova, he was included in the Canadian sanctions list against "persons using their art to promote Russia's invasion of Ukraine."

== Personal life ==
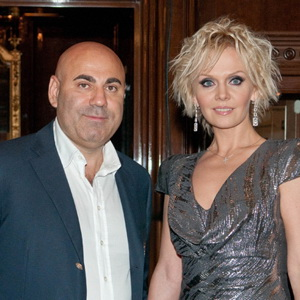
Iosif Prigozhin and Valeriya in the ceremony "Top Beauty Awards 2010" at Hotel "The Ritz-Carlton", 19 May 2010

Prigozhin has been married twice. His first wife was Elena Yevgenyevna Prigozhina, with whom he had a son Dmitry, born 1989, and daughter Danaya, born 1997. He then lived for 7 years with his partner Leila Fattakhova, with whom he has one daughter, Yelizaveta, born 1999. In 2004, he married the pop singer Valeriya.

== Books ==
In 2001, the publishing house AST published a book by Iosif Prigozhin titled Politics: The Pinnacle of Show Business.
