= Sanayev =

Sanayev (Russian: Санаев) (feminine: Sanayeva) is a Russian surname created from the dialectal diminutive Санай of the name Alexander. Notable people with the surname include:

- Elena Sanayeva (born 1942), Soviet and Russian actress and social activist
- Nurislam Sanayev (born 1991), Kazakh freestyle wrestler
- Pavel Sanayev (born 1969), Russian writer
- Vsevolod Sanayev (1912–1996), Soviet film and stage actor

== See also ==
- Saneyev, similar etymology
- Aida Šanaeva
