= Ver v chudesa =

Ver' v chudesa

Studio album by Kristina Orbakaitė
- Released: June 2002
- Genre: Pop
- Length: 45:15
- Language: Russian; English
- Label: NOX Music
- Producer: Viktor Drobysh

Kristina Orbakaitė chronology
Remixes (2001)	Ver' v chudesa (2002)	Okean lyubvi (2003)

Ver' v chudesa (Russian: Верь в чудеса, lit. 'Believe in miracles') is a fifth studio album by Russian singer Kristina Orbakaitė, released in 2002 by NOX Music. The album includes such hits as "Da-di-dam", "Moy mir" and "Lyubov, kotoroy bolshe net", which became winners of the Golden Gramophone Award and Pesnya goda.

== Critical reception ==
Tatiana Davydova, in her review for InterMedia, remarked that "if the main principle of show business is 'cherchez la hit', then the album Ver' v chudesa is just what's needed," since (using an equivalent Russian idiom) it is absolutely crawling with hits. She gave varied ratings to the album's individual songs, with the highest praise ("masterpiece") reserved for "Moy mir". Overall, she expressed that Orbakaitė had reached a high level of artistry despite her "obvious" lack of vocal talent.

Alexander Murzak from Zvuki.ru called the album "a typical product of brutal Russian show business", made according to the formula "they copied what they could, stole what they could, the rest was somehow born on its own".

== Track listing ==
No.	Title	Lyrics	Music	Length
1.	"Da-di-dam" (Russian: Да-ди-дам)	Lena Styuf	Viktor Drobysh	3:40
2.	"Rio de Janeiro" (Russian: Рио-де-Жанейро)	Zinovy Poprotsky	Valery Didula; Sergey Sorokin	4:04
3.	"Skazka dlya dvoikh" (Russian: Сказка для двоих, lit. 'A fairy tale for two')	Styuf	Drobysh	4:04
4.	"Moy mir" (Russian: Мой мир, lit. 'My world')	Natalya Platitsyna	Vladimir Sushko	2:23
5.	"All My Love"	Mary Applegate	Drobysh	3:36
6.	"Robot" (Russian: Робот)	Mikhail Tanich	Levon Merabov	3:14
7.	"Ubiraysya von" (Russian: Убирайся вон, lit. 'Get the hell out')	Olga Shamis	Sorokin	3:54
8.	"Davay ne portit' vecher" (Russian: Давай не портить вечер, lit. 'Let's not spoil the evening')	Shamis	Sorokin	4:38
9.	"Aist" (Russian: Аист, lit. 'Stork')	Tatiana Zalyzhnaya	Alla Pugacheva	3:31
10.	"Kak zhal'" (Russian: Как жаль, lit. 'What a shame')	Alexander Barykin	Александр Barykin	4:23
11.	"Ot zari do zari" (Russian: От зари до зари, lit. 'From dawn to dusk')	Oleg Gazmanov	Gazmanov	3:44
12.	"Zhivu v Moskve" (Russian: Живу в Москве, lit. 'I live in Moscow')	German Vitke	Artyom Pavlenko	3:58

Reissue bonus tracks
No.	Title	Lyrics	Music	Length
13.	"Lyubov', kotoroy bol'she net" (Russian: Любовь, которой больше нет, lit. 'The love that is no longer there'; duet with Avraam Russo)	Styuf	Drobysh	3:15
14.	"Lyubov', kotoroy bol'she net" (Remix)	Styuf	Drobysh	3:03
