= Vladimir Ziva =

Russian conductor

Vladimir Petrovich Ziva (Russian: Владимир Петрович Зива; born 7 March 1957) is a Russian conductor who graduated from both Moscow and Saint Petersburg Conservatories where he was under guidance from Evgeny Kudryavtsev and Dmitri Kitaenko respectively.

== Conductor ==
From 1984 to 1987 he was an assistant conductor of the Moscow Philharmonic Orchestra and then from 1986 to 1989 was a faculty member of his alma mater. In June 1988 he was a leader of the Nizhny Novgorod Philharmonic and then was invited by Svatoslav Rikhter to conduct The Contest Between Phoebus and Pan which was performed along with Boris Pokrovsky. During the same time he also conducted December Nights as well as Benjamin Britten's Albert Herring and The Turn of the Screw. Later on, he staged both Brothers Karamazov and Song, on the Water at the Moscow Chamber Musical Theatre.

He also was a conductor of Leonid Desyatnikov's Poor Liza at the Nizhny Novgorod Philharmonic and then did Sergei Prokofiev's Cinderella at the Nizhny Novgorod Opera and Ballet Theater. At the same time he also conducted Marcel Landowski's opera Madman at the St Petersburg Ballet Theatre followed by Prince Igor at the same place. Somewhere in the 1990s he have conducted Claude Debussy's Pelléas et Mélisande which was a join production with France. Later on, the same play was conducted by him along with Moscow Philharmonic Orchestra and its Chamber Theater in the United States at the Festival of Soviet Music. His notable performances were the Moscow Autumn and Leningrad Song which were performed at many Contemporary Music Festivals of France, Germany, Spain, Bulgaria, Greece, USA, and even Cuba.
