= Stanyuta =

Stanyuta or Staniouta (Russian or Belarusian: Станюта) is a gender-neutral Slavic surname that may refer to

- Melitina Staniouta (born 1993), Belarusian rhythmic gymnast
- Stefaniya Stanyuta (1905–2000), Belarusian theater and movie actress
