= Adventures in a City that does not Exist =

1974 film

- Directed by: Leonid Nechayev
- Written by: Sergei Muratov; Mark Rosovsky
- Starring: Evgeny Goryachev; Valentīns Skulme
- Cinematography: Yuri Shalimov
- Music by: Sergei Cortez
- Production company: Belarusfilm
- Release date: 1974
- Running time: 80 minutes
- Country: Soviet Union
- Language: Russian

Adventures in a City that does not Exist (Russian: Приключения в городе, которого нет, romanized: Priklucheniya v gorode, kotorogo net) is a 1974 Soviet children's musical film, directorial debut of Leonid Nechayev.

== Plot ==
Pioneer Slava Kurochkin dreams of space. He actively studies physics and astronomy, but at the same time he does not read fiction at all. By coincidence, he finds himself in a fairytale town, where the heroes of the most famous books live: The Snow Queen, Timur and His Squad, A White Sail Gleams, Les Misérables, Treasure Island and so on.

But, alas, in the city live not only positive characters — treacherous commerce adviser from the play The Snow Queen (by Evgeny Schwartz) decides to use Slavin's ignorance of books in order to deceive him and with the help of other antagonists to subjugate readers worldwide. The protagonists come to help the boy, and together with friends Slava manages to defeat the adviser and his henchmen. When Slava returns to the real world, the first thing he does is to go to the library.

== Cast ==
=== Protagonists ===
- Evgeny Goryachev as Slava Kurochkin, reader
- Igor Anisimov as Timur Garaev (from the book Timur and His Squad)
- Vyacheslav Baranov as Gavroche (from the book Les Misérables) (voiced by Hagar Vlasov)
- Alexander Plyushchev as Petya Bachey (from the book ''A White Sail Gleams'')
- Alexander Pokko as Gavrik (voiced by Nadezhda Podyapolskaya) (from the book ''A White Sail Gleams'')
- Tatiana Prusakova as Pippi Longstocking (from the book Pippi Longstocking)
- Igor Ambrazhevich as Tom Sawyer (from the book The Adventures of Tom Sawyer)
- Igor Kondratovich as Huckleberry Finn (from the book The Adventures of Tom Sawyer)
- Irina Shilkina as Gerda (from the fairy tale of H. C. Andersen The Snow Queen)
- Nikolai Grinko as Don Quixote (voiced by Artyom Karapetyan) (from the book "The Clever Hidalgo Don Quixote of La Mancha")
- Mikhail Sachuk as Dimka the Invisible (from the book of the same name by Korostylyov and Lvovsky)
- Alexander Pyatkov as Mitrofanushka (from the play The Minor)
- Fedor Khramtsov as armorer Prospero (from the book Three Fat Men)
- Galina Linnik as Somova

=== Antagonists ===
- Valentīns Skulme as commerce adviser (voiced by Zinovy Gerdt) (from the play The Snow Queen by Evgeny Schwartz)
- Gediminas Karka as Javer, Police Inspector (from the Les Misérables)
- Valery Nosik as informant "Mustache" (from the book The White Solitary Sails)
- Leonid Kanevsky as Captain Bonaventure (from the book Three Fat Men)
- Ivan Pereverzev as John Silver (from the book Treasure Island)
- Igor Gushchin as "Figure" (from the book Timur and His Squad)
- Leonid Kryuk as tall pirate
- Vadim Aleksandrov as short pirate
- Rostislav Shmyrev as general
- Valentin Bukin as owner of a pirate restaurant
- Stefaniya Stanyuta as Aunt Polly (from the book The Adventures of Tom Sawyer)

== Production ==
The film, shot in the studios of Belarusfilm during the year 1974, was Nechaev's first feature and its success allowed the director to make The Adventures of Buratino for the same production company.

== Reception ==
The film was described as "a sort of experimental production featuring the heroes of the most popular children's books."

== Literature ==
- Kostyukovich, Maria. A children's session. The long happy story of Belarusian feature films for children — Minsk: Madisont, 2020.
