= The Adventures of Buratino (1975 film) =

Soviet children's musical film

- DVD Cover
- Приключения Буратино
- Based on: The Golden Key, or the Adventures of Buratino
- Written by: Inna Vetkina
- Story by: Alexei Tolstoy
- Directed by: Leonid Nechayev
- Starring: Dmitri Iosifov; Nikolai Grinko; Yuri Katin-Yartsev; Tatyana Protsenko; Roman Stolkarts; Thomas Augustinas; Grigori Svetlorusov; Rina Zelyonaya; Vladimir Etush; Rolan Bykov; Elena Sanayeva; Vladimir Basov; Baadur Tsuladze; Valentin Bukin
- Music by: Alexey Rybnikov
- Country of origin: Soviet Union
- Original language: Russian

Production
- Producer: Vladimir Studennikov
- Cinematography: Yuri Elkhov
- Editor: Vera Kolyadenko
- Running time: 131 minutes (2 parts)
- Production company: Belarusfilm

Original release
- Release: 1975

The Adventures of Buratino (Russian: Приключения Буратино, romanized: Priklyucheniya Buratino) is a 1975 Soviet two-part children's musical television film produced by Belarusfilm.

Directed by Leonid Nechayev, the film was an adaptation of The Golden Key, or the Adventures of Buratino by Alexey Tolstoy in turn an adaptation of the 1883 Italian novel The Adventures of Pinocchio by Carlo Collodi. Inna Vetkina wrote the screenplay for The Adventures of Buratino, as well as several other films directed by Nechayev.

The plot of the film follows Buratino (Italian for "puppet"), a boy made of wood, who meets the Karabas Barabas' theatre actors and sets out to free them. In order to do so, he needs to unravel the mystery of a golden key given by the turtle Tortila. Characters such as Arlekin and Piero, who act in the children's theatre are part of commedia dell'arte.

The television premiere took place on 1 and 2 January 1976, on Programme One of the Soviet Central Television.

== Plot ==
=== Episode 1 ===
An old carpenter named Giuseppe, nicknamed "Blue Nose" as the neighborhood drunk, finds a log he intends to use for a table leg. To his surprise, the log speaks in a human voice, crying out after two blows from an axe. Frightened, Giuseppe, after a brief quarrel and quick reconciliation, decides to give the talking log to his neighbor and friend, Carlo, a street organist whose instrument has broken down. Carlo decides to carve a puppet from the log to entertain people. That night, he carves it out, and by dawn, the puppet comes to life, moving and talking on its own. The puppet is named Buratino (although the film does not specify Carlo's naming choice). Carlo plans to send Buratino to school, so he sells his only coat to buy a primer, leaving Buratino alone in his small room.

Left unsupervised, Buratino behaves irresponsibly, insulting the Talking Cricket who tries to advise him and clashing with Shushara, a rat who lives in the room, nearly resulting in Shushara dragging him off. Carlo intervenes in time to rescue Buratino, who, after receiving the primer, promises to improve his behavior and attend school. The next morning, Buratino sets out but is distracted by a puppet theater show in town. Selling his primer for four coins to a chubby boy, he buys a ticket to the show. During the performance, he interrupts a staged fight between Harlequin and Pierrot, stating that a theater that beats its performers is evil. His innocence wins the hearts of the theater puppets, leading to a joyful dance. The theater director, Karabas-Barabas, wakes up furious, drags Buratino off stage, and hangs him up on a nail.

Meanwhile, a leech-seller named Duremar quarrels with a turtle named Tortila, who vows never to give away the Golden Key, which brings happiness. Giuseppe and Carlo search for Buratino in the rain but return home empty-handed. During dinner, Karabas orders the puppets to take Buratino down and throw him into the fire, intending to use him as fuel. However, he unexpectedly sneezes, softening his temper. Buratino shares a bit of his story, and Karabas, intrigued, learns of the painted hearth in Carlo's room and gives Buratino five gold coins, with strict instructions to bring them to Carlo in the morning and keep him from moving houses. The puppets suspect this directive hides a secret.

On his way home, Buratino meets two con artists—a fox named Alice and a cat named Basilio. They persuade him to venture to the Land of Fools to grow his wealth, and he agrees. Soon, they arrive at the "Three Minnows" tavern, where Buratino orders three crusts of bread, while Alice and Basilio consume the rest of the food. After their meal, the two slip away before Buratino. Trickily, he leaves without paying but soon gets lost and calls out for Alice and Basilio.

Meanwhile, Carlo and Giuseppe prepare to set off in search of Buratino. The Cricket hints that boys like Buratino often end up in the Land of Fools.

=== Episode 2 ===
At night, Alice and Basilio, disguised as bandits, ambush Buratino. After a chase, Buratino hides the coins in his mouth, prompting the duo to hang him upside down from a tree, hoping he will drop the coins. When unsuccessful, they leave to fetch a saw.

Buratino is rescued by Malvina, a girl with blue hair who escaped from Karabas-Barabas and lives in the forest with her poodle servant, Artemon. She has Buratino cut down from the tree. Marionette characters, including Doctor Owl, Nurse Frog, and Healer Praying Mantis, debate his condition, ultimately prescribing castor oil. Buratino gives up on playing dead to resist taking the medicine. Dressed in fresh clothes, he tries to study math and penmanship with Malvina, but she locks him in a dark closet for misbehavior.

Elsewhere, Pierrot overhears Karabas-Barabas and Duremar discussing Tortila's hidden Golden Key. Karabas catches him eavesdropping, sparking a chase. Malvina, feeling pity, urges Buratino to behave, but he retorts defiantly. Buratino eventually escapes the closet, guided by a bat, and reunites with Alice and Basilio at the Field of Wonders—a garbage dump in town—where he buries the gold coins, waiting for a "money tree" to sprout. Alice then tips off the police about Buratino, who toss him into a pond. There, he meets Tortila, who, impressed by his kindness, gives him the Golden Key, though forgetting what it unlocks.

On his way home, Buratino encounters Pierrot, who reveals that Karabas-Barabas has dispatched bulldog police after them. Buratino leads Pierrot to Malvina, Pierrot's beloved, and they hide in the forest. Duremar, who saw Tortila give Buratino the Key, informs Karabas-Barabas, who sets out in pursuit.

At the "Three Minnows" tavern, Buratino tricks Karabas-Barabas by tying his beard to a table, hiding in a jug, and discovering that the Golden Key opens a secret door behind the painted hearth in Carlo's room. After watching everything, Alice and Basilio strike a deal to capture Buratino for ten gold coins. Karabas tries to trap Buratino, but he escapes, with Karabas, Duremar, and their cohorts in pursuit.

In the forest, Buratino and friends face their pursuers, narrowly escaping thanks to the timely arrival of Carlo and Giuseppe. They defeat Karabas-Barabas, who falls in exhaustion and offers Carlo money to abandon his friends. Carlo refuses, and they all leave together. At Carlo's room, Buratino reveals the door behind the painted hearth and opens it with the Golden Key. They step through, finding themselves in a crystal cave that leads to a theater stage, where they sing a final song and head to a magical land, as the curtain closes.

== Production ==
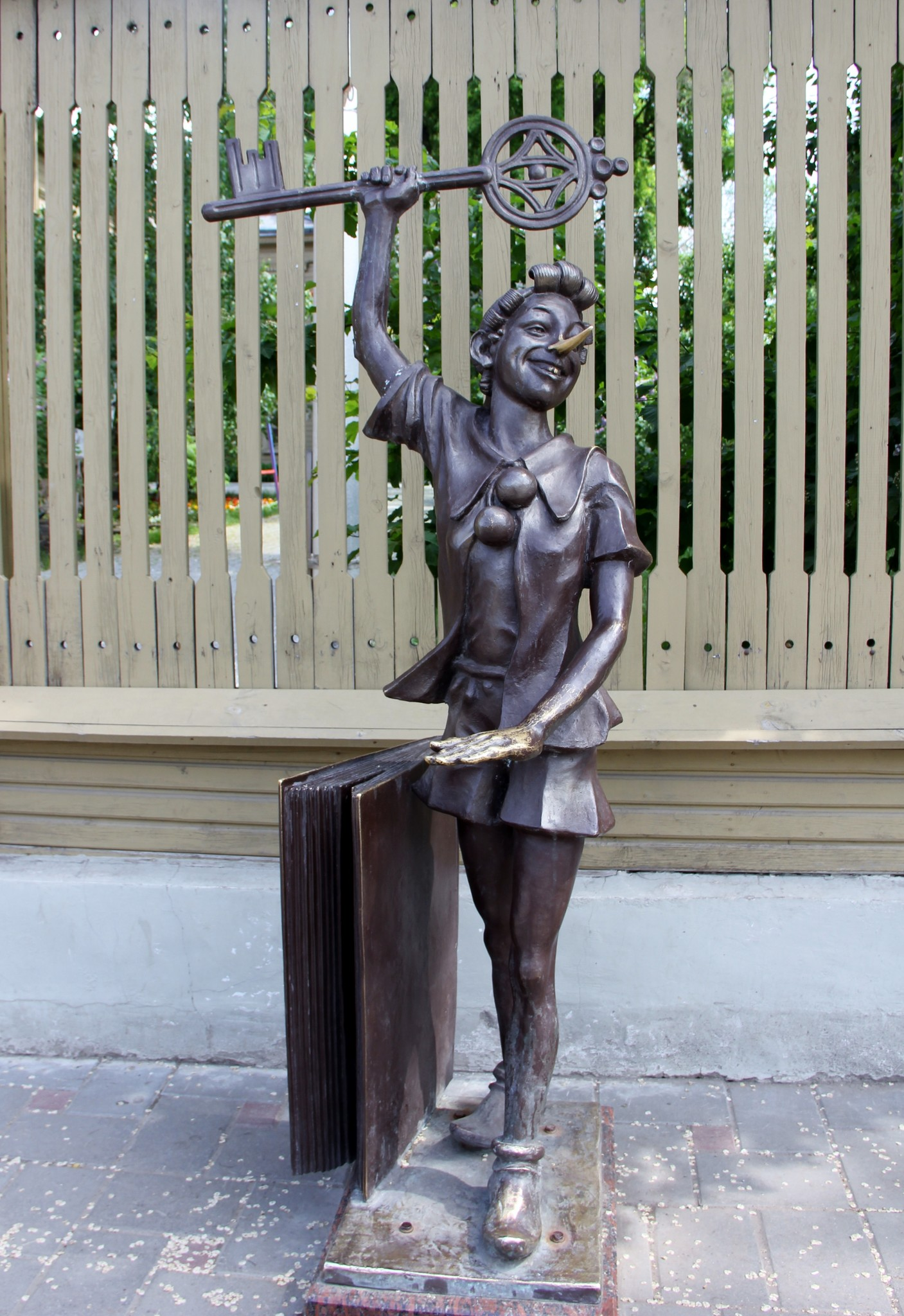
A monument to Buratino in Samara

Music for the film was composed by Alexey Rybnikov and the lyricists included Bulat Okudzhava, and Yuri Entin. There was an early interest by the director Nechayev to work with Yuli Kim (then writing under the last name Mikhailov) as a songwriter. At that time, Yuli Kim was banned from television, so they turned to Okudzhava. Okudzhava wrote music as well as lyrics, though only the music of Rybnikov was used in the film. The songs that Okudzhava wrote were serious and philosophical, so Nechayev also incorporated lyrics by Yuri Entin and omitted some of Okudzhava's.

Almost all of the children who acted in the film were from Minsk. Dima Iosifov played Buratino. The adults in the cast were famous actors from the rest of the Soviet Union. Nikolai Grinko played Papa Carlo. Vladimir Etush played Karabas Barabas. Rina Zelyonaya played the turtle Tortila. Rolan Bykov played the cat Bazilio.

A number of musical children's films followed, by the makers of The Adventures of Buratino, including About the Little Red Riding Hood (Про Красную Шапочку) in 1977. The television film itself has a cult following in the former Soviet Union.

== Cast ==
- Dima Iosifov as Buratino, the protagonist and the story's version of Pinocchio.
- Nikolai Grinko as Papa Carlo, the story's version of Geppetto.
- Yuriy Katin-Yartsev as Giuseppe, the story's version of Mastro Antonio
- Vladimir Etush as Karabas-Barabas, the story's version of Mangiafuoco.
- Rolan Bykov as Basilio the Cat, a version of the Cat.
- Elena Sanayeva as Alice the Fox, a version of the Fox.
- Tatyana Protsenko as Malvina, the story's version of the Blue Fairy
- Thomas Augustinas as Artemon, the story's version of Medoro
- Roman Stolkarts as Piero
- Grigori Svetlorusov as Arlekin
- Rina Zelyonaya as Tortila, a wise, old turtle who helps Buratino.
- Vladimir Basov as Duremar
- Baadur Tsuladze as Eating-house owner
