= Stefaniya Stanyuta =

Belarusian actress (1905–2000)

Stefanija Staniuta
- Стэфанія Станюта
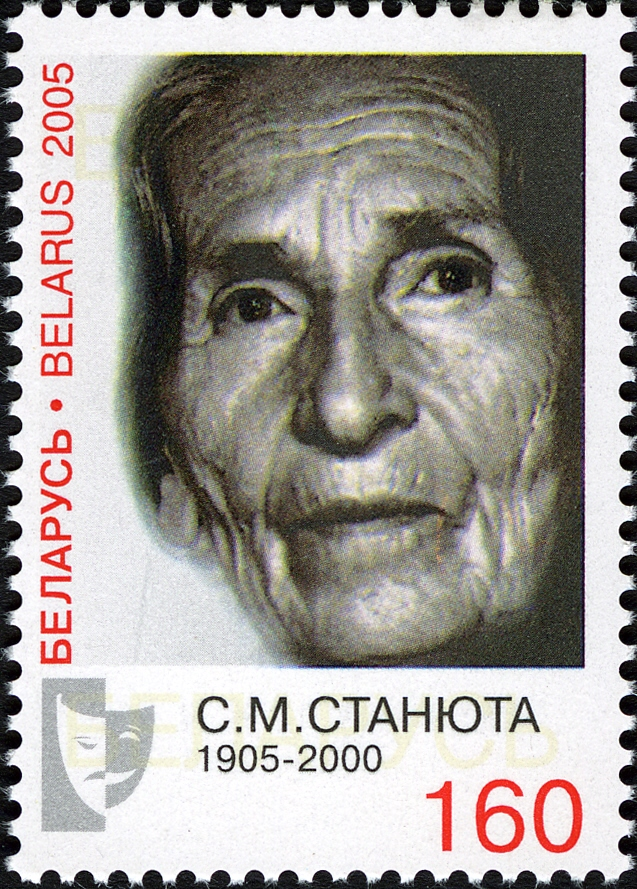
- 2005 stamp of Belarus
- Born: Stefanija Michajłaŭna Staniuta; 30 April 1905; Minsk, Russian Empire
- Died: 6 November 2000 (aged 95); Minsk, Belarus
- Occupation: Actress
- Years active: 1919–2000
- Spouse: Alaksandar Kručynski
- Children: 1
- Awards: People's Artist of the USSR (1988)

Stefanija Michajłaŭna Staniuta (Belarusian: Стэфанія Міхайлаўна Станюта; 30 April 1905 – 6 November 2000) was a Soviet and Belarusian stage and film actress. She was awarded the People's Artist of the USSR title in 1988.

== Biography ==
Staniuta was born in Minsk, in the family of the famous Belarusian artist Michaś Staniuta. As a child, she happened to attend the official meeting of Tsar Nicholas II with the Belarusian people.

She studied at the parish school, then at the Minsk Women's Government Gymnasium. In 1926 she graduated from the Belarusan Drama Studio under the Moscow Art Theatre (class of Valentin Smyshlyaev and Sofya Giatsintova).

Since 1932 and until the end of her life Staniuta worked at the Janka Kupala National Academic Theatre in Minsk. In total she played about 200 roles, including in movies from 1958 onward.

== Filmography ==
- 1958 – Red Leaves as episode
- 1964 – Letters to the Living as episode
- 1966 – I'm Going to Look For as episode
- 1969 – I, Francysk Skaryna as Abbess
- 1974 – Adventures in a City that does not Exist as Aunt Polly
- 1976 – The Troubled Month of Veresen as Serafima
- 1977 – About the Little Red Riding Hood as 1st evil old woman
- 1981 – Farewell as Darya
- 1983 – White Dew as Granny Marya "Kiselikha", Mishka Kisel's mother
- 1985 – Mama, I'm Alive as Domna Fialipaŭna, a teacher in a partisan detachment
- 1985 – Do Not Marry, Girls as Granny Khelendeyka
- 1991 – Tsar Ivan the Terrible as Anufriyevna
- 1995 – The Game of Imagination as Granny in a hat
- 2001 – Holiday Romance as episode

== Awards and honours ==
- Honored Artist of the Byelorussian SSR (1944)
- People's Artist of the Byelorussian SSR (1957)
- People's Artist of the USSR (28 April 1988)
- State Prize of the Byelorussian SSR (1982) – for stage work
- Two Orders of the Red Banner of Labour (1980, 1985)
- Order of Friendship of Peoples (1977)
- Order of the Badge of Honour (1955)
- Medal "For Distinguished Labour" (20 June 1940)
- Jubilee Medal "In Commemoration of the 100th Anniversary of the Birth of Vladimir Ilyich Lenin" (1969)
- Medal "For the Victory over Germany in the Great Patriotic War 1941–1945"
- Medal "For Valiant Labour in the Great Patriotic War 1941–1945"
- Medal "Veteran of Labour" (1975)
- Francysk Skaryna Medal (1995)
- Crystal Paulinka Prize (1992; inaugural recipient) of Belarusian Union of Theater Workers
