= Car, Violin and Blot the Dog =

- Russian poster
- Russian: Автомобиль, скрипка и собака Клякса
- Directed by: Rolan Bykov
- Written by: Alla Akhundova
- Starring: Oleg Anofriev; Rolan Bykov; Georgiy Vitsin; Zinoviy Gerdt; Nikolay Grinko
- Cinematography: Mikhail Ardabyevsky
- Edited by: Lyudmila Pechieva
- Music by: Maksim Dunaevskiy
- Production company: Mosfilm
- Release date: 1974
- Running time: 96 minutes
- Country: Soviet Union
- Language: Russian

Car, Violin and Blot the Dog (Russian: Автомобиль, скрипка и собака Клякса) is a 1974 Soviet family film directed by Rolan Bykov.

== Plot ==
In a seaside town, within a large courtyard surrounded by old, rundown two-story buildings, the characters of this film live their intertwined lives. Two school friends are in love with Anna, the most beautiful girl in the courtyard. One of them, Oleg, is a jack-of-all-trades driver who spends his time working on cars and other mechanical things. The other, David, is a musician learning to play the violin. Anna's older sister is finishing school but struggles with her studies, receiving help from both a classmate and a tutor. Anna also has a little brother, Kuzya, a creative spirit. With toothpaste, he transforms a black dog into his version of a "zerba". Kuzya has a dream — to have lots and lots of cats. He believes cats can easily be turned into monkeys, monkeys into bears, and from bears, he could create as many friends as he wants! Anna tries to get cats for him, all while sorting out her own feelings.

Kuzya's imaginative world is brought to life by a musical ensemble that also takes on the roles of various other characters, guiding and supporting the young heroes in their journey.

== Cast ==
- Oleg Anofriev as Electric guitar / Accordion
- Rolan Bykov as Conductor / driver Leonid Lomakin / old deaf-mute lady Marya Fyodorovna
- Georgiy Vitsin as Banjo / Guitar
- Zinoviy Gerdt as Drums / David's grandfather / David's father
- Nikolay Grinko as Contrabass / Oleg's father
- Mikhail Kozakov as Violin / Bass guitar / Tall cook
- Aleksei Smirnov as Helicon / Plump cook / house manager Ferdyshenko
- Spartak Mishulin as Musician without instrument / Taxi driver
- Aleksandr Chernyavsky as Kuzya
- Natalya Tenishchyova as Anya Khoroshaeva
