= Summer Is Over (film) =

- Russian: Пропало лето
- Directed by: Rolan Bykov; Nikita Orlov
- Written by: Rolan Bykov; Isai Kuznetsov; Nikita Orlov; Avenir Zak
- Produced by: Nikolay Vladimirov
- Starring: Vladimir Yevstafyev; Sergei Gudko; Zoya Fyodorova; Antonina Dmitrieva; Lyudmila Chernyshyova
- Narrated by: Yury Yakovlev
- Cinematography: Gennadi Tsekavyj; Viktor Yakushev
- Edited by: Irma Tsekavaya
- Music by: Boris Chaikovsky
- Production company: Mosfilm
- Release date: 1963
- Running time: 79 min.
- Country: Soviet Union
- Language: Russian

Summer Is Over (Russian: Пропало лето, romanized: Propalo leto) is a 1963 Soviet children's adventure comedy film directed by Nikita Orlov and Rolan Bykov.

== Plot ==
Sportsman-cyclist, jack of all trades Valera Bulyshev and dumbass Zheka Ruchkin are Muscovites and bosom friends. Their parents send them on summer vacations to the small town Kurepka to visit Valery's three aunts, who have never seen their nephew before.

Valery does not want to spend the whole summer with his old, boring, as he believes, aunts, and tries to get a job on an expedition to a random travel companion. Zheka has to go to his aunts and pretend to be their nephew, although they are the complete opposite of each other. But the expedition turns out to be an ordinary carriage of goods along the river, and Valery is forced to return to Kurepka too. However, on the way to the house, Valery, not knowing his aunts by sight, manages to come into conflict with all of them. And now he is forced to hide in the attic of the aunts' house, and Zheka has to continue to impersonate Valery.

But it turns out that the aunts are not boring at all, but very energetic and loved by everyone in the town. Zheka has fun and interesting time in their company, and Valery has to be bored in the attic.

After going through a whole series of funny and ridiculous adventures, Zheka becomes skillful and independent and even wins a bicycle race, not even being able to ride before, and Valery completely changes his unfair opinion about his aunts and receives their complete forgiveness.

== Cast ==
- Vladimir Yevstafyev as Zheka Ruchkin
- Sergei Gudko as Valera Bulyshev
- Zoya Fyodorova as aunt Dasha
- Antonina Dmitrieva as aunt Masha
- Lyudmila Chernyshyova as aunt Sasha
- Aleksandr Lebedev as policeman Muravey
- Yakov Lents as Head of the post office / Bridge worker
- Mikhail Pugovkin as Chief forwarder
- Sergey Filippov as Nikolay Erofeevich Bulyshev
- Rolan Bykov as shopper in a straw hat
- Pavel Pavlenko as Yevgeny Alexandrovich Ruchkin, Zheka's grandfather
