= The Nose (film) =

- Written by: Rolan Bykov
- Directed by: Rolan Bykov
- Starring: Rolan Bykov; Zinaida Slavina; Iya Savvina; Zinaida Sharko; Elena Sanayeva; Boryslav Brondukov
- Music by: Nikolaï Sidelnikov
- Country of origin: Soviet Union
- Original language: Russian

Production
- Cinematography: Anatoly Mukasei
- Editors: N. Kokoreva; G. Vladimirskaya; T. Pakhomycheva
- Running time: 96 min
- Production company: Studio Ekran

Original release
- Release: 1977

The Nose (Russian: Нос) is a 1977 Soviet TV historical drama film, directed by Rolan Bykov based on the short story by Nikolai Gogol.

== Plot ==
The action takes place in St. Petersburg in the first half of the 19th century.

Barber Ivan Yakovlevich, while eating breakfast, discovered someone's nose in a loaf of freshly baked bread. While attempting to dispose of the strange find, he was detained by the police.

An unpleasant incident befell Collegiate Assessor Kovalev. One fine morning, he discovered his nose was missing. Moreover, this important part of his face took on a life of its own.

== Cast ==
- Rolan Bykov as Collegiate Assessor Kovalev / Kovalev's Nose / Ivan Yakovlevich the Barber / farmer, wandering horses with baggage
- Zinaida Slavina as Praskovya Osipovna, Ivan Yakovlevich's wife
- Iya Savvina as woman of easy virtue
- Zinaida Sharko as head officer's Podtochina
- Elena Sanayeva as Podtochina's daughter
- Boryslav Brondukov an Ivan, Kovalev's servant
- Georgi Burkov as quarterly warden
- Lev Durov as a private bailiff
- Yevgeny Yevstigneyev as official newspaper of the expedition
- Vladimir Basov as doctor
- Valentin Nikulin as janitor
- Yuri Bogatyryov as Emperor Nicholas I of Russia
- Semyon Morozov as servant of the Countess
- Vladimir Fyodorov as dwarf

== Features ==
The script of the film is close to the story of Gogol. Small differences are in the individual replicas of characters and minor details. So, for example, the story mentions only that Kovalev wrote a letter to Podtochina, and the text of the letter is given. The film also shows Subtotal and her daughter at the time they receive and read the letter.

In the final, the film and the story completely diverge. In the story Kovalev, having found his nose in the same place, continues to live a normal life. In the film Kovalev gets back his nose, a new rank, marries and dies from an overabundance of feelings. Near the grave of Kovalev (in the film) is the grave of Ivan Aleksandrovich Khlestakov, the main hero of Gogol The Government Inspector.
