= The Overcoat (1959 film) =

- Film poster
- Directed by: Aleksey Batalov
- Screenplay by: Leonid Solovyov
- Story by: Nikolai Gogol
- Starring: Rolan Bykov; Yuri Tolubeyev, Aleksandra Yozhkina, Elena Ponsova
- Cinematography: Genrikh Marandzhyan
- Music by: Nikolai Sidelnikov
- Production company: Lenfilm
- Release date: 2 February 1959
- Running time: 75 minutes
- Country: Soviet Union
- Language: Russian

The Overcoat (Russian: Шинель) is a 1959 Soviet drama film directed by Aleksey Batalov, based on Nikolai Gogol's short story "The Overcoat".

== Cast ==
- Rolan Bykov - Akaki Akakiyevich
- Yuri Tolubeyev - Petrovich
- Aleksandra Yozhkina - Petrovich's Wife
- Elena Ponsova - Landlady
- Georgi Tejkh - Important Person
- Nina Urgant - lady of easy virtue
- Aleksandr Sokolov - undertaker
- Rem Lebedev - assistant chief clerk, birthday
- Aleksey Batalov
- Georgii Kolosov - private bailiff
- Nikolai Kuzmin - robber
- Glikeriya Bogdanova-Chesnokova - wife of the birthday man
- Mikhail Ladygin - usurer
- Pyotr Lobanov - quarterly warden
- Vladimir Maksimov - director
- Gennadi Voropayev - officer
- Gennady Nilov
- Kira Kreylis-Petrova - servant
