= Sergei Cortez =

Belarusian composer

- Cortez in 2010
- Born: Сярге́й Альбе́ртавіч Картэ́с; 18 February 1935; San Antonio, Chile
- Died: 26 June 2016 (aged 81); Minsk, Belarus
- Occupation: Composer

Sergei Cortez (Belarusian: Сярге́й Альбе́ртавіч Картэ́с, Russian: Серге́й Альбе́ртович Корте́с; 18 February 1935 – 26 June 2016) was a Belarusian composer.

Cortez was born in San Antonio, Chile. He lived for most of his early life in Argentina, and emigrated with his parents to Minsk in the Byelorussian SSR in 1955 at the age of 20.

== Works ==
- One-act operas Jubilee and The Bear after stories by Anton Chekhov. The Bear was premiered by Alexander Anisimov and the Belarusian Philharmonic. Jubilee was premiered at the Moscow State Academic Chamber Musical Theatre B. A. Pokrovsky.
- Visit of the Lady «Визит дамы»

== Selected filmography ==
- Adventures in a City that does not Exist (1974)
