= There Was a Piano-Tuner... =

- Russian: Жил-был настройщик…
- Written by: Rolan Bykov; Vladimir Alenikov
- Directed by: Vladimir Alenikov
- Starring: Rolan Bykov; Elena Sanayeva
- Music by: Sergei Anashkin; Gennady Gladkov
- Country of origin: Soviet Union
- Original language: Russian

Production
- Cinematography: Nikolai Moskvitin
- Running time: 68 min.
- Production company: Studio Ekran

Original release
- Release: 1979

There Was a Piano-Tuner... (Russian: Жил-был настройщик…, romanized: Zhil-byl nastroyshchik...) is a 1979 Soviet feature comedy film directed by Vladimir Alenikov.

== Plot ==
A modest and undistinguished eccentric tuner Ivan Ivanovich, who dreams of being a conductor, walks around the apartments of different people, tuning musical instruments. His way to work is always accompanied by adventures — either a neighbor with an expander climbs up to him, or an eccentric magician deceives him. Among his clients, there are also different people: this is a deaf old man who has all the notes sinking in, and a little chess player girl, whose relatives are constantly deciding who she should be in the future. One day the tuner, going to the addresses, meets the woman of his dreams — sublime and inaccessible.

== Cast ==
- Rolan Bykov as Ivan Ivanovich, the tuner (musical numbers are performed by Pyotr Podgorodetsky)
- Elena Sanayeva as Lena
- Valery Nosik as Nikodim Savelyev
- Mikhail Kokshenov as Kuzma
- Igor Yasulovich as magician
- Georgy Martirosyan as Slavik (voiced by Nikolai Karachentsov)
- Irina Murzaeva as Lena's neighbor
