= Scarecrow (1984 film) =

- Directed by: Rolan Bykov
- Written by: Rolan Bykov; Vladimir Zheleznikov
- Produced by: Sergei Woolman
- Starring: Kristina Orbakaite; Yuri Nikulin; Elena Sanayeva; Rolan Bykov; Svetlana Kryuchkova
- Cinematography: Anatoly Mukasei
- Music by: Sofia Gubaidulina
- Release date: 14 September 1984
- Running time: 127 minutes
- Country: USSR
- Language: Russian

Scarecrow (Russian: Чучело, romanized: Chuchelo) is a 1984 Soviet teen drama film dealing with school bullying directed by Rolan Bykov, loosely based on the novel by Vladimir Zheleznikov.

== Plot ==
The film opens with school children bullying and harassing a young girl, Lena Bessoltseva, who begins running away from them as they increase the level of taunting and pressure. The mob chases the young girl to the river's edge, where she gets rescued by her grandfather. He takes her home and asks her what the attack was all about. She equivocates, but then slowly reveals the reason for the bullying over the course of the film, which is told in a series of flashbacks.

When Lena arrived at the new school, she acquired the nickname "scarecrow" due to a clumsy fall in class. She then develops a liking for the most popular boy in class, threatening the established social order. The young girl Shmakova, once the favorite of the class hero Somov, now has to move to another desk. This tension leads to much of the drama later in the movie.

The students are excited about an upcoming spring break trip to Moscow. In the meantime, they decide to skip a literature lesson and go watch a movie instead. Somov is uncomfortable with the idea and ends up revealing to the teacher that the class ran off to the movies. As part of their punishment, the class does not get to go to Moscow. One of the tougher girls who goes by the nickname "Iron Tack" figures that someone betrayed them about the movie. She decides to find out who the traitor is. To save Somov, Lena says that it was she who told the teacher. This begins a series of terrifying chase scenes through the village as the schoolkids turn up the pressure on Lena, while Somov keeps insisting to Lena that he will come clean and tell them the truth. In the end, he is unable to.

After telling her grandfather the long story of how she took on the guilt of her beloved, Lena goes to the village beauty shop, where she cuts her hair off, and then shows up at Somov's birthday party. She delivers a pointed diatribe about many of her classmates, and then dramatically whips off her shawl, revealing her bald head. She also announces that she's leaving the village.

Back at school, Lena comes in to find that Somov has finally confessed to the rest of the class that he was the one who told the teacher. He's now standing at the edge of the window, threatening to jump. Lena talks him into getting down from the window, and many of the students congratulate Lena on being tough and not leaving. The teacher greets her class and announces that Lena's grandfather has donated his home and a priceless collection of paintings by a famous artist who once lived in the village. The collection has been appraised as extremely valuable, and the home will become a museum for the collection. At that point, the grandfather comes in to collect his granddaughter Lena. He leaves a special painting, wrapped in a cloth, with the class. When the teacher unwraps the painting, it is revealed to be a young woman who appears just like Lena did with her short hair. The children are stricken with shame over what they did to her, and one student writes on the chalkboard above the painting "Scarecrow, forgive us".

== Cast ==
- Kristina Orbakaite as Lena Bessoltseva
- Yuri Nikulin as Nikolay Nikolayevich Bessoltsev, Lena's grandfather
- Elena Sanayeva as Margarita Ivanovna Kuzmina, a teacher
- Svetlana Kryuchkova as auntie Klava, a hairdresser
- Rolan Bykov as the conductor of the military orchestra of the Suvorov Military School
