= Shared Bread =

- Şərikli çörək
- Directed by: Shamil Mahmudbayov
- Written by: Alla Akhundova
- Starring: Kamran Rajabli; Tuna Namazova; Firuz Aliyev
- Music by: Vasif Adigozalov
- Production company: Azerbaijanfilm
- Release date: 1969
- Running time: 68 minutes
- Country: Soviet Union
- Languages: Azerbaijani, Russian

Shared Bread (Azerbaijani: Şərikli çörək; Russian: Хлеб поровну) is a 1969 Soviet drama film directed by Shamil Mahmudbayov, depicting life on the home front during World War II. The screenplay is by Alla Akhundova, and the music is composed by Vasif Adigozalov. The film received a state award and features scenes filmed in various locations in Baku and Nalchik.

== History ==
Shared Bread is a 1969 Azerbaijani film directed by Shamil Mahmudbayov. During the Soviet era, films were classified into five evaluation categories, with the highest being "Excellent". Directors of films receiving this designation enjoyed greater creative freedom, including the ability to select topics and scripts without censorship. Initially, Shared Bread was rated "4th category" in Azerbaijan, which significantly limited the director's opportunities for future artistic projects. However, following its review in Moscow, the film received an "Excellent" rating, resulting in the revocation of its initial classification and its subsequent release to a wider audience.

Set against the backdrop of World War II, the film portrays the struggles of children in May 1945, focusing on their quest for sustenance amid war's devastation. The character Vagif represents resilience and hope, contrasting the harsh realities faced by his peers. Mahmudbayov's film illustrates the profound impact of war on childhood, emphasizing themes of loss, maturity, and survival.

Today, Shared Bread is regarded as one of the finest Soviet films and is recognized for its poignant depiction of the effects of war on youth, serving as a significant commentary on the broader societal implications of conflict.

== Music ==
The film Shared Bread, directed by Shamil Mahmudbayov, features a significant musical score composed by Vasif Adigozalov. The music serves as an integral element that enhances the film's emotional resonance and thematic depth, reflecting the struggles and innocence of children during World War II.

Adigozalov's composition incorporates a blend of traditional Azerbaijani melodies and classical elements, effectively evoking the historical context and the film's poignant narrative. The score is strategically utilized throughout the film to underscore key emotional moments, emphasizing themes of resilience, hope, and the impact of war on youth.

The use of music in Shared Bread not only enriches the viewing experience but also reinforces the film's message about the preservation of cultural identity and the pursuit of peace amidst adversity. The soundtrack's role in shaping the film's atmosphere highlights the interplay between sound and visual storytelling, contributing to its status as a notable work in Azerbaijani cinema.

== Cast ==
- Firuz Aliyev as Tofig
- Sofa Basirzade as Sofa Besirzade
- Agahüseyn Cavadov as Aghahuseyin Javadov
- Aliheydar Hasanzada as Aliheydar Hasanzada
- Yelena Inyakina as Lina
- Khosrov Mamayev as Ashraf
- Adila Mammadova as Adila
- Camila Mammadova as Camila
- Mirzaagha Mirzayev as Kenka
- Sadaya Mustafayeva as Samama
- Tuna Namazova as Leyla
- Cingiz Quliyev as Miska
- Kamran Rəcəbli as Vagif
- Fazil Salayev as Mohammed
