= Valentin Smyshlyaev =

Valentin Sergeevich Smyshlyaev (14 March 1891, Perm – 3 October 1936, Moscow) was a Russian actor, theatre director and theatre theorist.

Valentin studied at the law faculty of Imperial Moscow University from 1912 to 1917. He started work at the Moscow Art Theatre in 1913.

He was active in the Proletkult movement: he led the Theatre Department of the Moscow Proletkult and was the head of the artistic part of the Central Arena of the Proletkult He was also the head of the section of mass performances of the TEO of the People's Commissariat for Education.

In 1923 he was appointed director of the Belarusian Theatre Studio in Moscow and was recognised as having authority over among both teachers and students and was responsible for all the creative activities of the studio. Mikalai Mickiewicz, who was studying at the studio, described Smyshlyaev as “Of average height, thin, extremely lively, temperamental, and emotional."

== Texts ==
- 1920 "Постановка работ театральных студий" (Staging works of theatre studios) Proletarskaya Kul'tura, No.17-19 August – December, 1920
