= Leonid Nechayev =

Russian film director (1939–2010)

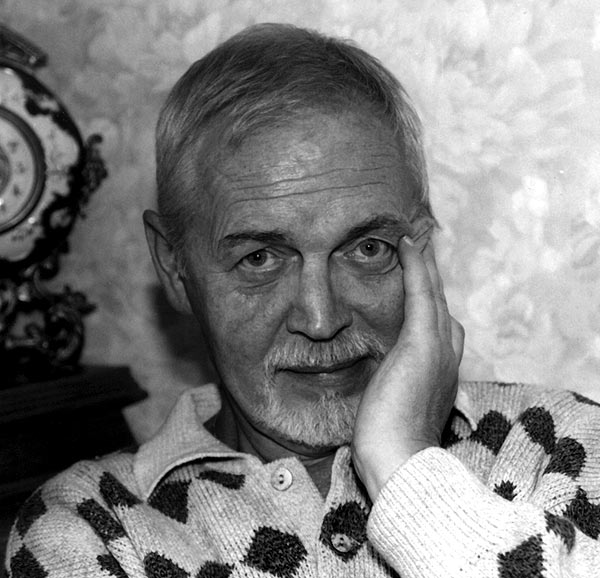

Leonid Alexeyevich Nechayev (Russian: Леони́д Алексе́евич Неча́ев; 3 May 1939 – 24 January 2010) was a Russian children's film director.

== Career ==
Nechayev's career as director was launched in 1974 with a film called Adventures in a City that does not Exist. He was also the creator of the popular musical fairy tales About The Little Red Riding Hood and The Adventures of Buratino. He was a prolific director at the studio Belarusfilm, where he worked for 17 years and shot 10 films. The Minsk Museum of Cinema has a hall exclusively dedicated to his creative legacy.

== Death ==
Nechayev died on January 24, 2010, aged 70, following a stroke.

== Selected filmography ==
- Adventures in a City that does not Exist (1974)
- The Adventures of Buratino (1976)
- About the Little Red Riding Hood (1977)
- Peter Pan (1987)

== Awards ==
- State Prize of the Russian Federation (1993)
- People's Artist of Russia (2003)
