= Alla Akhundova =

Azerbaijani poet, screenwriter and translator (1939-2026)

Alla Akhundova (

Azerbaijani: Alla Nuru qızı Axundova;

Russian: Алла Нуриевна Ахундова; 27 October 1939 – 17 September 2026) was an Azerbaijani Russian-language poet, screenwriter and translator. She was known for her work on Shared Bread, Car, Violin and Blot the Dog, and Along Unknown Paths.

Akhundova was born in Moscow on 27 October 1939. She graduated from the Maxim Gorky Literature Institute in 1964 and from the screenwriting department of the High Courses for Scriptwriters and Film Directors in 1967.

She was awarded the State Prize of the Azerbaijan SSR in 1970 and received the honorary title of Honored Art Worker of the Azerbaijan SSR in 1988.

Akhundova died on 17 September 2026, at the age of 86.
