= Elena Sanayeva =

Russian actress (born 1942)

- Елена Санаева
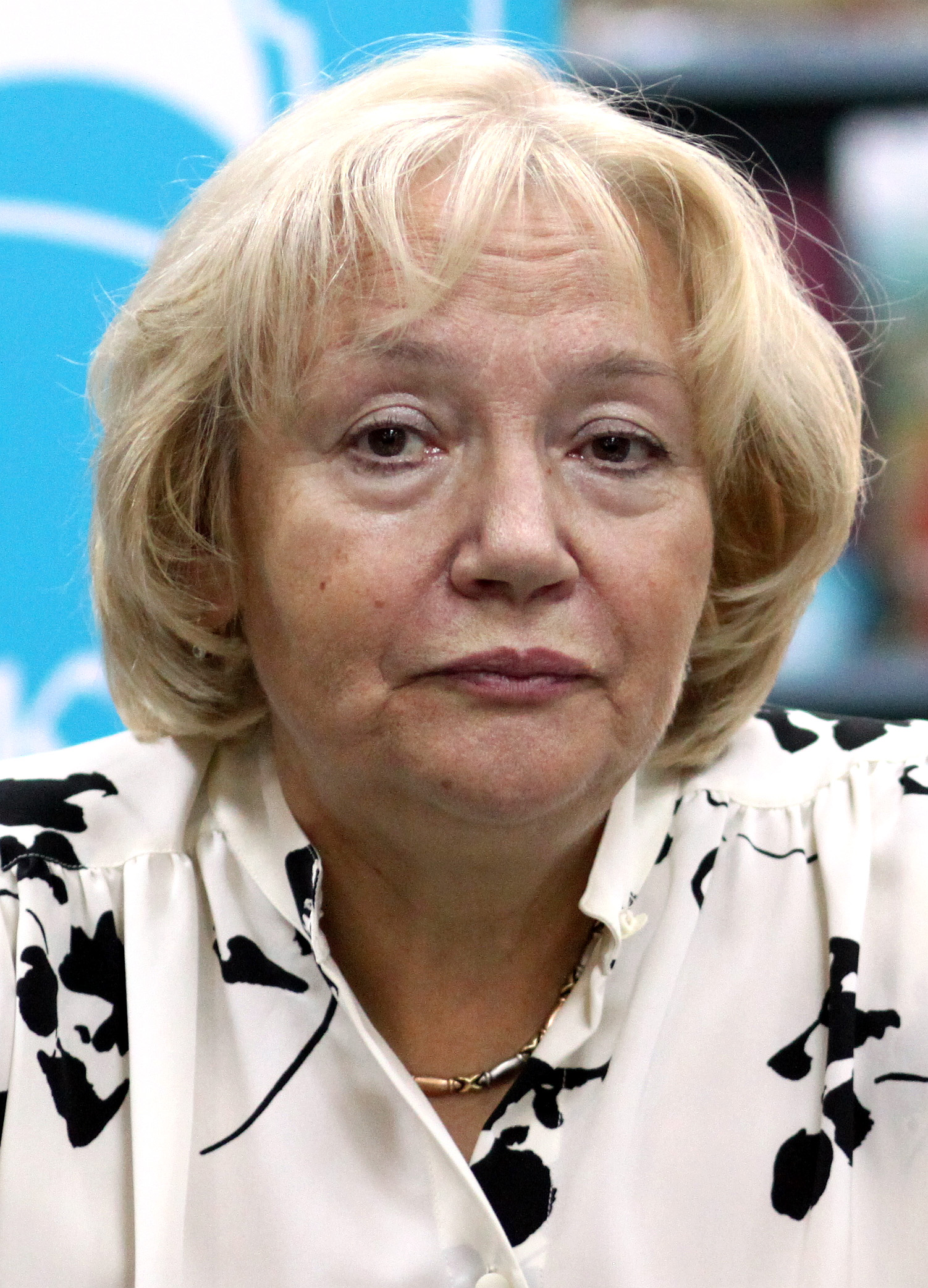
- Sanayeva in 2010
- Born: Elena Vsevolodovna Sanayeva; 21 October 1942 (age 84); Kuibyshev
- Occupation: Actress
- Years active: 1967–presents
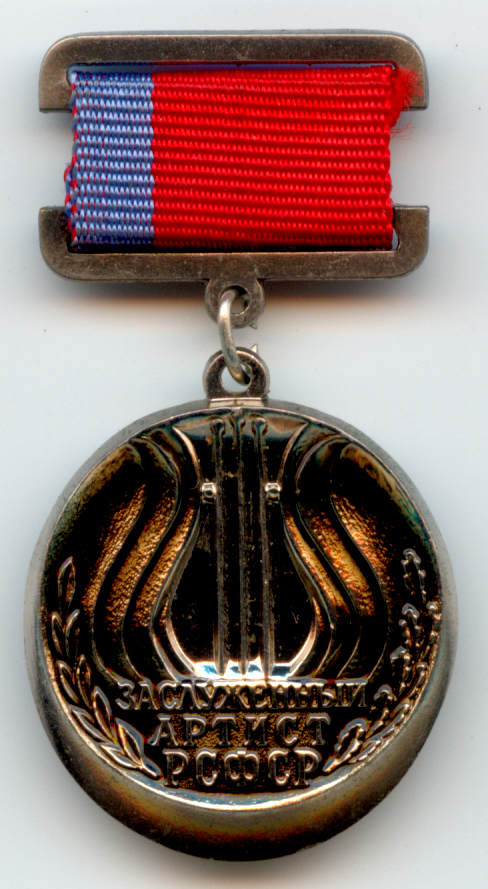
- Awards

Elena Vsevolodovna Sanayeva (Russian: Еле́на Все́володовна Сана́ева; born 21 October 1942,) is a Russian theater and film actress and social activist. She is an Honored Artist of the RSFSR (1990) and People's Artist of the Russian Federation (2022).

== Family ==
- Father — People's Artist of the USSR Vsevolod Sanayev (1912—1996).
- Mother — Lidya Sanayeva (1918—1995).
- Brother — Alexey, died in his childhood during The Great Patriotic War.
- First husband — engineer Vladimir Konuzin.
  - Son — Pavel Sanayev (born 16 August 1969), a Russian writer, actor, film director, screenwriter and translator.
  - Granddaughter — Veronica (born in 2012).
- Second husband — actor and film director Rolan Bykov (1929—1998).

== Selected filmography ==
- 1974 — At Home Among Strangers as bride
- 1975 — The Adventures of Buratino as Lisa Alisa
- 1977 — The Nose as Podtochin's daughter
- 1978 — The Cat Who Walked by Herself as cow (voice)
- 1979 — There Was a Piano-Tuner... as Lena
- 1980 — Adventures of Ali-Baba and the Forty Thieves as the spirit of cave Sim-Sim
- 1982 — Private Life as Marina
- 1984 — Scarecrow as Margarita
- 2007 — Kilometer Zero as Olga Sergeyevna

=== Voice acting ===
- 1986-1987 — The Adventures of Lolo the Penguin as Lala, Lolo's mother
