= Moscow Chamber Musical Theatre =

Theater and opera house in Moscow, Russia

Coordinates: 55.7581°N 37.6235°E

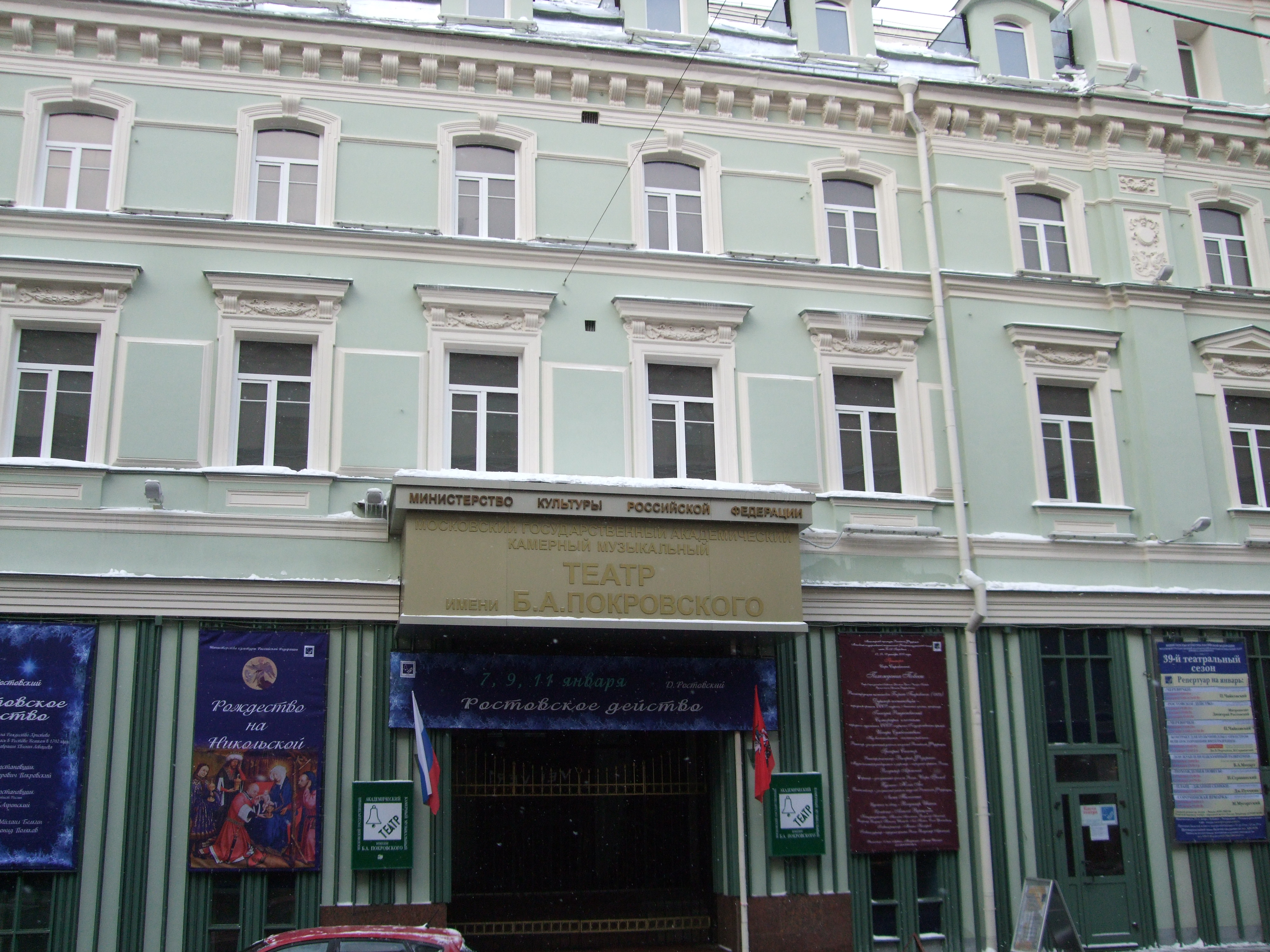
Pokrovsky Opera

The Moscow State Academic Chamber Musical Theatre (Московский государственный академический Камерный музыкальный театр имени Б. А. Покровского) is a Moscow theatre and opera house. The theatre was founded in 1971 and carries the name of its founder Boris Alexandrovich Pokrovsky. The theatre troupe resident at the theatre is also known as the "Pokrovsky Opera".

== Repertoire ==
Among the operas premiered at the theatre:

- Boris Kravchenko - The Tale of the Priest and of His Workman Balda; opera after Pushkin's The Tale of the Priest and of His Workman Balda (Сказка о попе и работнике его Балде)
- Mikael Tariverdiev Waiting (Ожидание)
- Nikolai Sidelnikov Run (Бег)
- Vladimir Rebikov A nest of nobles after Turgenev (Дворянское гнездо)
- Shirvani Chalaev Blood wedding (Кровавая свадьба, Ш.Р.Чалаев)
- Tatyana Kamysheva The Adventures of Chipollino («Приключения Чиполлино» Т. Камышева)
- Vladimir Dashkevich The Inspector (Ревизор)
- Metropolitan Dimitry of Rostov (1702) Rostov childhood «Ростовское действо»
- Vissarion Shebalin "The Taming of the Shrew" (Укрощение строптивой)
- Sergei Cortez Jubilee and The Bear ("Юбилея" и "Медведя" С. Кортес)
