= Qaya =

- Location within Azerbaijan
- Coordinates: 40°26′37″N 50°16′40″E
- Country: Azerbaijan
- City: Baku
- Time zone: UTC+4 (AZT)
  - Summer (DST): UTC+5 (AZT)

Qaya (also Apsheronskiy Port and Port Apsheronskiy) is a village in Baku, Azerbaijan.
