= Rolan Bykov =

Soviet-Russian actor and director

- Ролан Быков
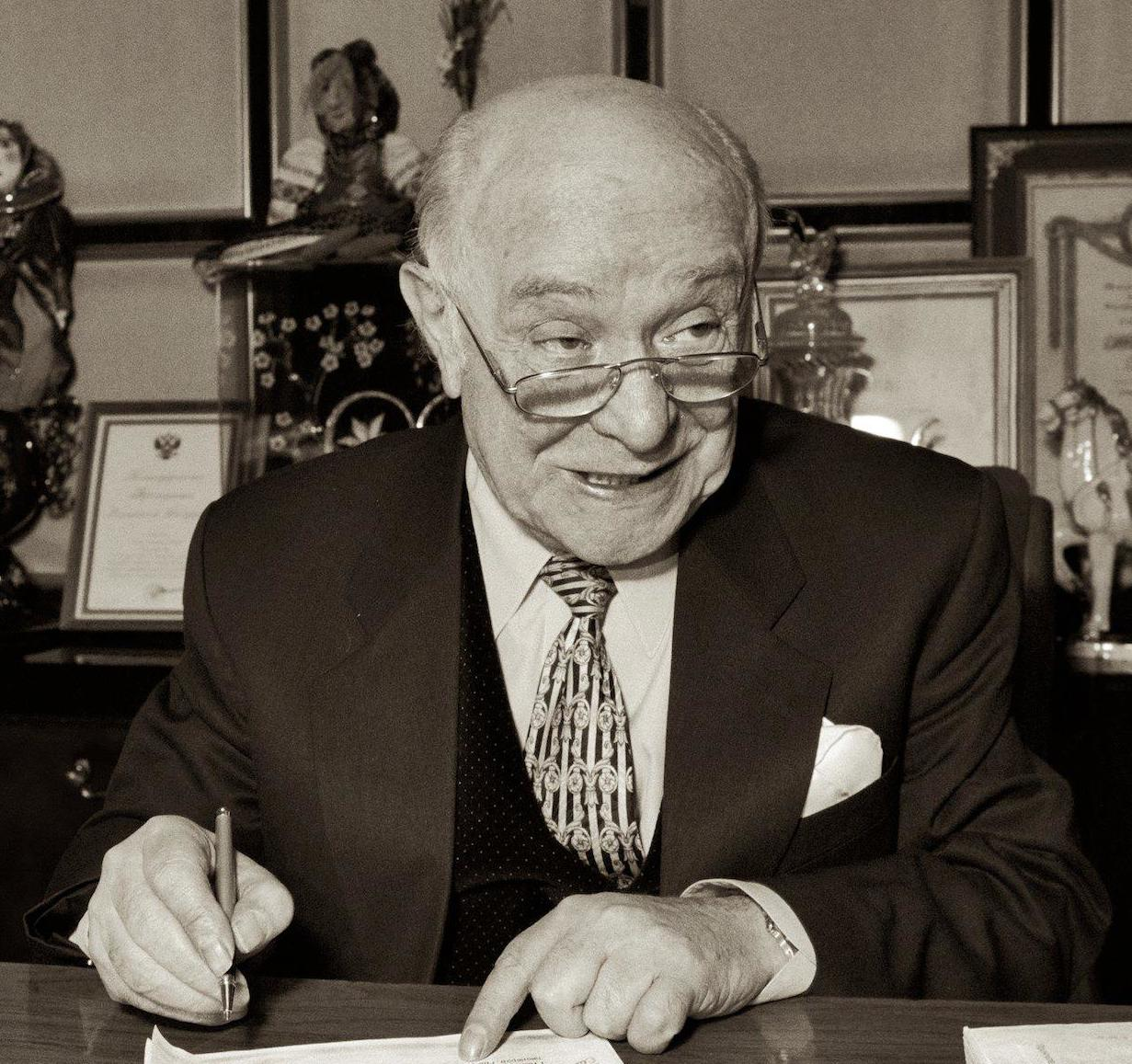
- Born: October 12, 1929; Kiev, Ukrainian SSR, Soviet Union
- Died: October 6, 1998 (aged 68); Moscow, Russia
- Resting place: Novodevichy Cemetery
- Occupations: Actor, director, screenwriter, pedagogue
- Years active: 1951–1998

Rolan Antonovich Bykov (Note: Russian: Ролан Антонович Быков, romanized: Rolan Antonovich Bykov; Ukrainian: Ролан Антонович Биков, romanized: Rolan Antonovych Bykov) (October 12, 1929 – October 6, 1998) was a Soviet and Russian stage and film actor, director, screenwriter and pedagogue. He was named People's Artist of the USSR in 1990.

== Early life ==
Rolan Bykov was born to Anton Mikhailovich Bykov and Olga Matveyevna Bykova (née Sitnyakovskaya), the youngest of two brothers. There are many myths surrounding his biography, including the names of Rolan and his parents, date and place of birth. Different directories showed that he was born in Moscow, yet Bykov and his brother Geronim stated that their family moved to Moscow from Kyiv in 1934. Throughout his life Rolan Antonovich Bykov was officially known as Roland Anatolyevich Bykov and his date of birth — as November 12 which, according to him, was caused by a mistake in his passport. He named various reasons for this: from a drunken militsioner at the passport office to his own aunt who confused names and dates while arranging his documents. As for the unusual name, Rolan explained that he was named after Romain Rolland (according to the Russian pronunciation) by his parents who confused Romain's surname for his name.

Bykov's father was a military and intelligence officer of mixed Polish-Czech ancestry originally named Semyon Geronimovich Gordanovsky. He started his career by participating in World War I and making a successful escape after being taken captive by Austria-Hungary. During the Russian Civil War he fought as part of the 1st Cavalry Army led by Semyon Budyonny. From 1924 till 1926 he worked in Cheka and regularly visited Germany under different passports. His last code name was Anton Mikhailovich Bykov which he adopted as a real name. He was later promoted to a high-ranking position in the Communist Party of the Soviet Union and served as a managing director at various enterprises.

Bykov's mother also changed her name from Ella Matusovna to Olga Matveevna at one point. While Bykov regularly referred to her and her relatives as «Ukrainians», she was in fact a daughter of a prosperous Jewish NEPman. She wanted to become an actress and finished two courses of a theater institute, but was expelled for truancy.

Between 1937 and 1947 Bykov studied in Moscow schools. In 1939 he joined a youth theatrical studio organized by a Pioneers Palace where he met Alexander Mitta, Boris Rytsarev and Igor Kvasha. During the Battle of Moscow his family was evacuated to Yoshkar-Ola for three years, although his father chose to stay and volunteered for the front line. In 1947 he entered the Boris Shchukin Higher Theater College to study acting under Vera Lvova and Leonid Shikhmatov.

== Career ==
In 1951 Bykov graduated and immediately joined the Moscow Youth Theater where he served as an actor and a stage director until 1959. Simultaneously he also appeared in several movies in episodic roles, worked as an actor at the Moscow Drama Theater (1951—1952), as the head of the theater studio at the Bauman Palace of Culture (1951—1953), as a stringer for various children's programmes at the Soviet Central Television and as an editor on radio (1953—1959). He made his acting debut in the film School of Courage. In 1957 he organized a Student's Theater at the Moscow State University where he served as the main director up until 1959. Iya Savvina was among actors he discovered in the process.

Between 1959 and 1960 Bykov headed the Lenin Komsomol Theatre in Leningrad, but left it for cinema. In 1959 he played the main part of Akaki Akakiyevich in The Overcoat, an adaptation of Nikolai Gogol's story directed by Aleksey Batalov. Soon after he joined Mosfilm where he spent the rest 40 years working as an actor and a film director. He played over 100 roles and became highly popular as a comedy actor with such roles as Chebakov from Balzaminov's Marriage (1964), Barmalei from Aybolit-66 and Skomorokh from Andrei Rublev (both 1966), Ivan Karyakin from Two Comrades Were Serving (1968), Petrykin from Big School-Break (1973), Cat Bazilio from The Adventures of Buratino (1975), Father Fyodor from The Twelve Chairs (1976) and others.

As a film director he became known for his experimental children's and family movies. Among his most famous works are Seven Nannies (1962), Aybolit-66 (1966), Attention, a Turtle! (1970) and Scarecrow (1983). His films are generally associated with postmodernism, presented as a mix of different styles, genres and techniques, with theatrical musical numbers, arthouse editing, fourth wall breaking and so on. An unexpectedly grim Scarecrow released in 1984 became especially controversial and led to a lot of public criticism; some insisted it should be banned. Bykov survived a heart attack in the process. Yet in 1986 with the start of perestroika he was awarded the USSR State Prize for his movie.

Apart from his movie career Bykov also worked as an educator at High Courses for Scriptwriters and Film Directors. Between 1986 and 1990 he served as a secretary of the Union of Cinematography of the USSR. He was also a member of the Nika Award organization.

In 1989 Bykov headed the Younost studio at Mosfilm dedicated to children's cinema. Between 1989 and 1992 he also headed the All-Soviet Center of Cinema and TV for Children and Youth. In 1992 he created and headed the Rolan Bykov's Fund (also known as International Fund for Development of Cinema for Children and Youth). According to his 1994 interview to Vladislav Listyev, they had produced 64 movies by that time and received various awards internationally, yet none of them were shown at Russian movie theaters since new management saw them as nonprofitable.

Since 1989 Bykov had been involved in the political life of Russia. Between 1989 and 1991 he served as a member of the Congress of People's Deputies of the Soviet Union. He also headed a Nonpartisan Socio-Political Movement 95 that expressed support to culture, science, education and ecology. During the 1995 Parliamentary elections he headed a liberal pro-government Common Cause party along with Irina Khakamada and Vladimir Dzhanibekov. He also served as a president of the Help bank at one point.

In 1996 Bykov was diagnosed with lung cancer and survived a surgery. He died two years later from thrombosis. He was buried at Novodevichy Cemetery.

== Personal life ==
His first wife was actress Lydia Nikolayevna Knyazeva (1925—1987). They met at the Moscow Youth Theater and spent 15 years together. They also adopted a boy from an orphanage and raised him under the name of Oleg Rolanovich Bykov (1958—2002). He appeared in Scarecrow in minor role and produced several movies, but left the industry shortly after.

Second wife was actress Elena Sanayeva, a daughter of the acclaimed Soviet actor Vsevolod Sanayev. Bykov adopted her son from her first marriage to Pavel Sanayev (born 1969), who became a popular Russian film director and writer. His part-autobiographical novel, Bury Me Behind the Baseboard, published in 1994 became a national bestseller. Bykov is featured in it under the pseudonym Tolik. The book was adapted as a 2009 drama film Bury Me Behind the Baseboard, although the Sanayev family were displeased with it.

Bykov also wrote poetry since he was a boy, and published a book of poems in 1994 entitled Poems by Rolan Bykov that was re-released several times. In 2010 his widow Elena Sanayeva published a book of Bykov's diaries (from 1945 to 1996) that contained a lot of personal thoughts along with his wife's commentaries.

In later years Bykov expressed a lot of concern regarding the movie industry and newer times in general. In his interview to Vladislav Listyev he stated that modern cinema was solely built around money, or the golden calf as he called it, with no place for art. «Back in 1984 I survived a heart attack following the release of Scarecrow; recently I survived a stroke during the production of a 10-minute short under Belgian producers». In his interviews to Leonid Filatov, he characterized modern times as «corrupted», «a collapse of culture and morals», and modern cinema — as «a cigarette butt's art». In his diaries he continued those themes, predicting a Third World War, an environmental disaster and a general «schizophreniation» of the world population. The only exit he saw was a cultural and spiritual renaissance.

== Selected filmography ==
=== Actor ===
- School of Courage (1954) acting debut
- Road to Life (1955)
- The Overcoat (1959)
- Resurrection (1960)
- Travel in April (1962)
- I Step Through Moscow (1963)
- Balzaminov's Marriage (1964)
- Fitil (1964-1974)
- Hello, That's Me! (1966)
- Andrei Rublev (1966)
- Aybolit-66 (1966)
- Commissar (1967)
- Two Comrades Were Serving (1968)
- Dead Season (1968)
- Viimne reliikvia (1969)
- The Crown of the Russian Empire, or Once Again the Elusive Avengers (1971)
- Trial on the Road (1971)
- Big School-Break (1972)
- Ilf and Petrov Rode a Tram (1972)
- The Adventures of Buratino (1975)
- Rudin (1976)
- The Twelve Chairs (1976)
- The Nose (1977)
- Domestic Circumstances (1977)
- Wounded Game (1977)
- About the Little Red Riding Hood (1977)
- Alibaba Aur 40 Chor (1979)
- There Was a Piano-Tuner... (1979)
- Dusha (1981)
- Scarecrow (1984)
- Dead Man's Letters (1986)
- Me Ivan, You Abraham (1993)
- The Gray Wolves (1993)
- Shirli-Myrli (1995)

=== Director ===
- Seven Nannies (1962)
- Summer Is Over (1963)
- Fitil
- Aybolit-66 (1966)
- Attention, Turtle! (1970)
- Telegram (1971)
- Car, Violin and Blot the Dog (1974)
- The Nose (1977)
- Scarecrow (1984)
- I Will Never Return Here (1990)

== Awards and honors ==
- Medal "For Labour Valour" (1967)
- Jubilee Medal "In Commemoration of the 100th Anniversary of the Birth of Vladimir Ilyich Lenin" (1970)
- Honored Artist of the RSFSR (1973)
- USSR State Prize (1986) – for film Scarecrow
- People's Artist of the RSFSR (1987)
- Vasilyev Brothers State Prize of the RSFSR (1987) – for his role as Professor Larsen in film Dead Man's Letters
- Nika Award for Best Actor (1988) – for film Commissar
- People's Artist of the USSR (1990)
- Order "For Merit to the Fatherland", 4th class (11 November 1994)
