= About the Little Red Riding Hood =

1977 television film by Leonid Nechayev

- Russian: Про Красную Шапочку
- Based on: Little Red Riding Hood
- Directed by: Leonid Nechayev
- Starring: Yana Poplavskaya, Evgeni Evstigneev, Dmitri Iosifov
- Country of origin: Soviet Union

Original release
- Release: 1977

About the Little Red Riding Hood (Russian: Про Красную Шапочку, romanized: Pro Krasnuyu Shapochku) is a 1977 Soviet two-part musical TV movie based on the ideas of Charles Perrault and directed by Leonid Nechayev. The story is a sequel of the tale of Little Red Riding Hood.

The film is a deconstruction of the classic fairy tale. The manner in which the characters of the wolves is portrayed is different from the original story, as the wolves are viewed as human beings throughout the film. They are akin to a family of forest hermits or a clan of bandits.

== Plot ==
The story takes place one year after the well-known story of Little Red Riding Hood. The wolf, who had been killed by the woodcutter, is revealed to have left behind family and friends who now wish to get revenge on Little Red. The deceased wolf's mother pays his friend, Lean Wolf to take her other son, Fat wolf and together catch Little Red Riding Hood.

Lean Wolf makes Little Red Riding Hood believe that her grandmother has fallen ill again. Unaware that her grandmother is not truly ill, Little Red Riding Hood sets out through the forest to go visit her, meeting the wolves in disguise and other people on her journey. The little girl manages to foil all of the plans that the wolves devise to catch her. They try changing into multiple disguises that will deceive Little Red Riding Hood into believing that they are kind and friendly, but in the end, they get carried away playing her games and continually fail to catch her.

Wolf cub, the deceased wolf's son, who spends his time reading, argues with his grandmother that Little Red Riding Hood did nothing to deserve his father's attack. He is clearly opposed to taking revenge on anyone for the things that have happened and prefers to have nothing to do with his vengeful wolf family. His grandmother, angry with his rebelliousness, burns his book, which sends the cub into tears, and he runs away from home.

On her travels, Little Red Riding Hood meets with ever more obstacles, such as a young, spoiled boy who wishes to take Little Red Riding Hood as his possession so he can play with her whenever he wishes. He locks her in a room, but she is saved by Lean Wolf and Fat Wolf, who are now dressed as stately women ("we are your grandmother's friends!"), but are waiting with a sack to snatch her up. Wolf Cub takes the sack and foils their plans.

The cub tries to hint to Little Red Riding Hood that her grandmother is not truly ill, but she doesn't understand and continues on her way, and again the two wolves attempt to catch her. However, Fat Wolf has grown attached to Little Red Riding Hood and does not want to capture her.

Little Red later learns, from a shepherd boy who had conspired with the wolves, that her newfound companions are indeed wolves. Upset and frustrated by this news, she swaps clothes with the shepherd and gets the Lean Wolf to confirm his identity. When they ask her to fetch some water, she instead brings the wolves a sleeping potion made of poppies, and they are put to sleep. Wolf Cub fights the shepherd boy and returns Little Red Riding Hood's clothes.

While seeking help, Little Red Riding Hood encounters a brave and proud hunter, who in reality is a coward. He wishes to shoot the wolves while they are asleep, but the girl stops him because she wishes to take the wolves to her village to be judged and so they can repent.

From the little rich boy and Red Riding Hood's grandmother, the people from the village learn of the trouble and come to Little Red Riding Hood's aid. They intend to hurt the wolves, but Little Red does not wish them any harm. She allows the wolves to flee.

== Awards ==
The actress playing the main role of Little Red Riding Hood was a laureate of the USSR State Prize in literature and arts in 1978 for her acting in this film.

== Cast ==
- Yana Poplavskaya as Little Red Riding Hood
- Evgeni Evstigneev as Star Counter
- Dmitri Iosifov as Wolf Cub
- Rina Zelyonaya as Grandma
- Vladimir Basov as Loan Wolf
- Nikolay Trofimov as Small Fat Wolf
- Galina Volchek as Mother Wolf
- Rolan Bykov as Hunter
- Stefaniya Stanyuta as 1st evil old woman
- Mariya Barabanova as 2nd evil old woman
- Maria Vinogradova as 3rd evil old woman
- Yuri Belov as Grandad
- Aleksandra Dorokhina as Lady
- Georgi Georgiu as Gentleman
- Inna Stepanova as Kid
