= Avraam Russo =

Russian opera singer (born 1969)

Avraam Russo Авраам Руссо
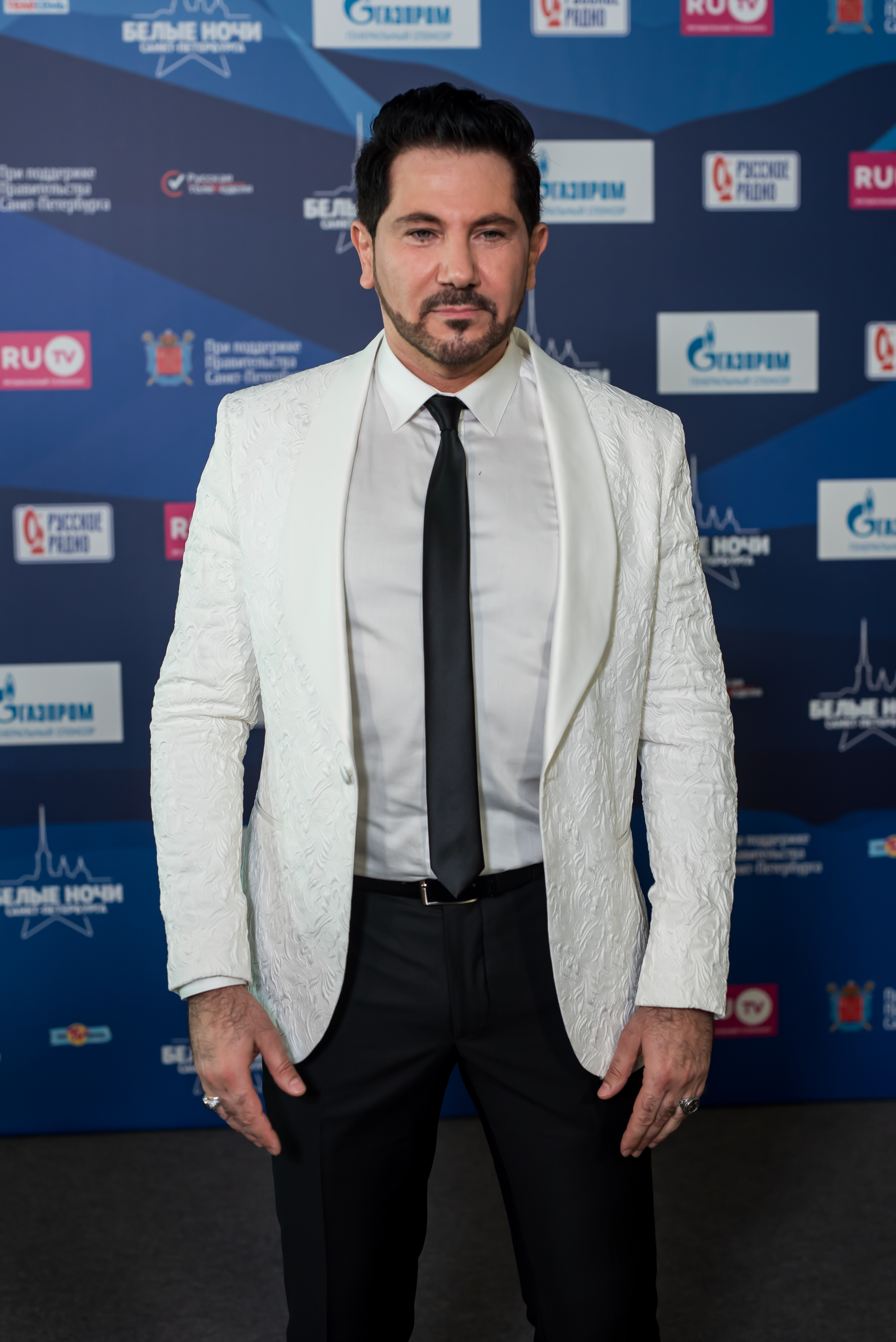

Background information
- Born: Abraham Zhanovich Ipjian; July 21, 1969 (age 56); Aleppo, Syria
- Origin: Syrian-Armenian
- Genres: Pop, Pop-folk
- Occupation: Singer
- Instrument: Vocals
- Years active: 1993–present
- Website: avraamrusso.net

Avraam Russo (Russian: Авраам Руссо, Armenian: Աբրահամ Ռուսսո, Arabic: أفرام روسو); born as Abraham Jean Ipjian, now Abraham Zhanovich Ipjian (Russian: Абрахам Жанович Ипджян; born July 21, 1969) is a Syrian-born Russian pop singer of Armenian origin.

Russo is an international artist who has recorded songs in a number of languages. He shot to fame with "Daleko Daleko", a Russian cover of a big Arabic language hit, "Tamally Maak" by Amr Diab.

He has four platinum albums recorded in Russia Amor (2001), Tonight (2002), Prosto Lyubit' (2003) and Obruchalnaya (2006) with songs in Russian and English. Amor became a No. 1 hit in Russia and throughout Eastern Europe. He has sold millions of album copies worldwide. His most recent album is an all-English spiritual album Resurrection (2010) recorded in the United States where he resides with his wife Morela and daughter Emanuela.

== Early years ==
Avraam was born in the Syrian city of Aleppo to an Armenian family with three brothers. One of his brothers is Jean Ipjian. His father was from the city of Gaziantep in Turkey and his mother is from Diyarbakır.

Avraam lost his father at an early age and his mother had to serve other households for the survival of the family. His singing talent was discovered while he was performing Armenian liturgical songs during his monastic studies in Aleppo. He also studied in an Armenian Orthodox seminary in Bikfaya, Lebanon for a couple of years. After leaving the studies, he was quickly involved in several amateur bands, making part-time appearances in Arab venues and outdoor restaurants (such as "Ramaya", "Aleppo Family Swimming Pool", "Somar", Orouba Club, etc.) and in hotels like "Al Amir" in Aleppo. During these years he was affectionately known as Apig or Apo, derivatives of his birthname Abraham.

In 1993 he went to Cyprus and worked in night clubs for two years earning meagre salaries. But his presence in Cyprus proved important for his future career, as he got the attention of a Russian Azerbaijan-Jewish tycoon Telman Ismailov (originally from Baku, Azerbaijan SSR and now Vice President of the Euro-Asian Jewish Congress) who, during one of his business trips to Cyprus, attended Avraam's performance and liked his work very much. Being owner of big retail businesses and entertainment outlets including "Prague Restaurant" and a well connected entrepreneur, he invited Avraam to take part in multilingual performances in Russia taking the name Avraam Russo.

== Russian career ==
Avraam's first trip to Moscow in 1995 landed him fame in a relatively short time. With the help of a girlfriend, he quickly learned the Russian language and prepared a repertoire in many languages, exactly the way he used to do in Syria and Cyprus with Middle Eastern and European influences. His command of European languages was also impressive. There was always a kind of mystery about his origin and he was subject of many speculations as to his origins. But despite pressure from his Syrian compatriots, he himself did not explicitly refer to his ethnic background, due to an informal agreement he made with his management team even before receiving wide recognition.

In 2006 he suffered an assassination attempt in Russia. On August 19, 20 meters from the Russo's house, unknown persons shot at his car with a Kalashnikov rifle. Abraham barely managed to leave the scene. The singer received severe injuries and lost 3.5 liters of blood. During the surgical operation, the question of amputation of the leg arose, but the doctors managed to close the vein and save the leg. The foreword was never revealed. Russo recovered and moved to New York City.

== American career ==
After his miraculous recovery and ability to walk again after his serious injuries and after a hiatus of 4 years in New York, Avraam Russo released his fifth studio album entitled Resurrection in early 2010, conveying his faith in Christianity which he credits for his survival. Resurrection is also his first-ever all-English Christian spiritual record recorded in Nashville, Tennessee. He infuses great spiritual depth and passion into the work produced by Dove Award winner Joe Beck and by Jim Frazier. In December 2009 he released the first single "Peace" taken from the album. The song is about child soldiers and released in aid of the Invisible Children charity.

In 2009 he officially opened his own restaurant "Heaven" in New York. In January 2010, Avraam Russo returned to Russia and gave a series of concerts in various Russian cities. He is currently preparing to release a new album in Russian language. Abraham also recorded a duet in Amsterdam named "Лунная соната" ("Moonlight Sonata") with Kazakh singer Diana Shik.

== Awards ==
In 2002 Avraam Russo won the Russian national top award for "Song of the Year" ("Pesnya Goda") for his international hit "Daleko Daleko" (Far Away in Russian), a cover version of the 2000 Arabic language massive hit "Tamally Maak" performed by Egyptian pan-Arab superstar Amr Diab.

== Personal life ==
He is married to Morela Russo (born 1982), a US citizen. Registered marriage in Butyrsky registry office on September 8, 2005. They were married in Israel for the Christmas holidays (2005–2006). He has 2 daughters, the oldest is Emanuella (born on December 27, 2006) while the youngest daughter is Avemaria (born on August 19, 2014).

== Discography ==
Albums

- 2001: Amor
- 2002: Tonight
- 2003: Prosto lyubit' (in Russian: Просто любить)
- 2003: Amor (on Private Moon Records)
- 2006: Obruchalnaya (in Russian: Обручальная)
- 2010: Resurrection

Compilations and live

- 2006: Live (on Misterija Zvuka)
- 2006: The best of Avraam Rousso (on Misterija Zvuka)

DVDs

- 2002: 1001 éjszaka (meaning 1001 nights) – (DVD of concert in the Olympic Stadium in Moscow on November 21, 2002)
- 2006: Obruchalnaya (meaning Engagement) – (DVD of concert in Moscow Kremlin on March 8, 2006)

Singles (original Russian name in case in Russian)

- «Любовь, которой больше нет» ("Love, that doesn't Exist Anymore") with Kristina Orbakaite
- «Просто любить тебя» trans» ("Just to Love You") with Kristina Orbakaite
- «Amor»
- «Arabica»
- «Baby»
- «Bailando»
- «Baila que Baila»
- «Fire horse»
- «La amo»
- «Milliones de fuego»
- «Quiereme»
- «Searching for love»
- «Si senor»
- «Teardrop»
- «Tonight»
- "Bud so mnoj" (in Russian «Будь со мной» trans. "Be with Me")
- "Daleko-Daleko" (in Russian «Далеко-далеко» trans. "Far-Far")
- "Znayu" (in Russian «Знаю» trans. "I Know")
- "Kak Byt" (in Russian «Как быть» trans. "How to Be" or can be interpreted as "What to Do")
- "Kasablanka" (in Russian «Касабланка» trans. "Casablanca")
- "Latino" (in Russian «Латино» )
- "Leto" (in Russian «Лето» trans. "Summer")
- "Lyubov i sudba" (in Russian «Любовь и судьба» trans. "Love and the Destiny")
- "Menya ne goni" (in Russian «Меня не гони» trans. "Don't Send Me Off")
- "Ne dolyublyu" (in Russian «Не долюблю» trans. "Won't Love You Enough")
- "Ne ukhodi" (in Russian «Не уходи» trans. "Don't Leave")
- "Obruchalnaya" (in Russian «Обручальная» trans. "..of Engagement")
- "Menak em" (in Armenian: "Մենակ եմ" trans. "I'm alone")
- "Ojidanie" (in Russian: "Ожидание" trans. "Expectation")
- "Opa-Opa" (in Russian: "Опа-опа" )
- "Prazdnik" (in Russian: "Праздник" trans. "Celebration")
- "Galis es" (in Armenian: "Գալիս էս" trans. "You are coming")
- "Tam" (in Russian: "Там" trans. "There")
- "Ty Odna" (in Russian: "Ты одна" trans. "You Are Alone")
- "Ya ne Lyublyu Vas" (in Russian: "Я не люблю вас" trans. "I Don't Love You")
- "Peace"
