= Kristina Orbakaitė =

Russian-Lithuanian singer and actress (born 1971)

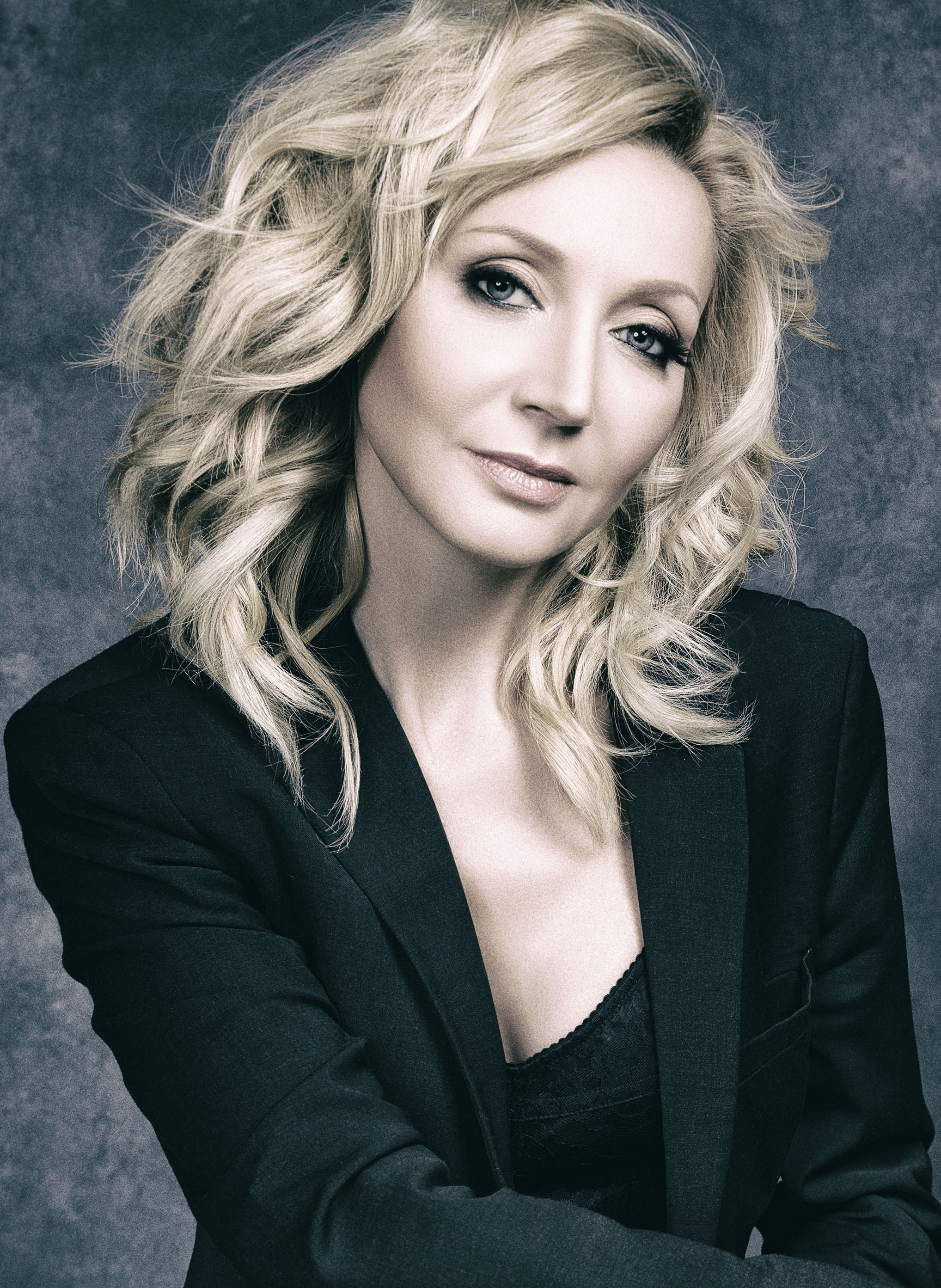
- Kristina Orbakaitė (2017)
- Born: Kristina Edmundovna Orbakaite; 25 May 1971 (age 55); Moscow, Soviet Union
- Occupations: Singer-songwriter, actress, record producer
- Years active: 1983–present
- Spouses: Vladimir Presnyakov Jr. (m. 1988; div. 1996); Ruslan Baisarov (m. 1997; div. 2002); Mikhail Zemtsov (m. 2005)
- Children: 3, including Nikita Presnyakov
- Parents: Alla Pugacheva; Mykolas Orbakas
- Awards: World Music Awards (2000, 2002)
- Musical career
- Genres: Synthpop; pop rock
- Instrument: Vocals
- Website: orbakaite.ru

Kristina Edmundovna Orbakaitė (Russian: Кристина Эдмундовна Орбакайте; born 25 May 1971) is a Russian-Lithuanian singer and actress. Her parents are Russian pop star Alla Pugacheva and Lithuanian circus performer Mykolas Orbakas.

== Biography ==
Kristina Orbakaite was born in Moscow and spent much of her childhood between Šventoji, Lithuania, the home of her paternal grandparents, and Moscow, the home of her maternal grandparents.

At the age of 7, she debuted in the Soviet children's television program "Veseliye Notki" (Happy Musical Notes) with the song "Solnyshko Smeyotsya" (The Sun Laughs). In 1982, she was cast in the leading role of "Lena Bessoltseva" in Scarecrow, a film by Rolan Bykov based on the Vladimir Zheleznikov play of the same name. Production began in 1982 and the film premiered in 1984. It became a critical success, not only in Russia but also overseas, and turned Orbakaite into a child star.

Having met with success in film and music, Orbakaite tried her hand at theater, appearing in 1995 as Helen Keller in an adaptation of William Gibson's The Miracle Worker on the stage of the Moscow Art Theatre. She subsequently received an award from the Russian Ministry of Culture for best female theatrical performance.

In 1996, Orbakaite and her partner, singer Vladimir Presnyakov, joined her mother, Alla Pugacheva, and her mother's then husband, singer Philipp Kirkorov, on a family performance tour through the United States titled "Zvezdnoye Leto" (Starry Summer). During this tour, she performed for the first time at Carnegie Hall in New York City.

In 2000, Orbakaite won World Music Awards in Monte Carlo as the best-selling Russian singer. Later that year, she released her fourth album May.

In 2002, she released her fifth album, Ver v chudesa (Believe in miracles) and appeared in the television series Moscow Saga. In 2003, she released her sixth album, Pereletnaya ptitsa (Wandering bird) and in 2005, she released her seventh album, My life. On 17 January 2004, Kristina met her husband, American businessman Mikhail Zemtsov in Miami. They married in a private ceremony on 9 March 2005 in Miami Beach city hall.

In 2006, Orbakaite appeared in the comedy Lyubov-morkov (Love-carrot) together with Gosha Kutsenko. In 2013, received the title Merited Artist of the Russian Federation from Russian president Vladimir Putin.

In December 2016, her "Insomnia" world tour was presented with two shows in State Kremlin Palace. In 2017, the tour was presented in Russia, Israel, France, Kazakhstan, the United Kingdom, Germany and all Baltic states.

In 2022, right after full-scale russian invasion of Ukraine, she posted on Instagram “Only Peaceful Skies! No to war!”. However, the post was quickly deleted and the singer has yet to condemn the war.

In 2025 Kristina Orbakaitė was declared persona non grata in Latvia due to performing in occupied Ukrainian territories and voicing support for russian regime.

== Personal life ==
Orbakaite is married to Russian-American businessman Mikhail Zemtsov. They have a daughter, born on 30 March 2012. Orbakaite also has two sons to singer Vladimir Presnyakov Jr. (m. 1991–1996) and businessman Ruslan Baisarov, born in 1991 and 1998.

In one interview, she stated that she was descended from the German von Orbach family, but during World War II her grandfather, who married a Polish woman and fought the Nazis, had to change his German surname to the Lithuanian Orbakas. Arriving in Lithuania in autumn 2001, Orbakaitė however stated that she had said nothing of the sort. In February 2002, as the granddaughter of Lithuanian citizens, she was granted Lithuanian citizenship at her request.

As of October 2018 Orbakaite likes to spend time at her residence in the Miami, Florida area.

== Discography ==
- 1994 – Верность "Fidelity"
- 1996 – Ноль Часов, Ноль Минут "Zero Hours, Zero Minutes"
- 1998 – Ты "You"
- 1999 – Той Женщине, Которая... "To That Woman, Who.."
- 2000 – Май "May"
- 2001 – The Best
- 2001 – Remixes
- 2002 – Верь В Чудеса "Believe in Miracles"
- 2002 – Океан Любви "Ocean of Love"
- 2003 – Перелётная птица "Wandering Bird"
- 2005 – My Life
- 2008 – Слышишь.. это я "Listen...it's me"
- 2009 – The Best Part 1 and Part 2
- 2011 – Поцелуй на бис "Encore Kiss"
- 2013 – Маски "Masks"
- 2016 – Бессонница "Insomnia"
- 2021 – Svoboda "Freedom"

== Filmography ==
- 1983 - Scarecrow (Lena Bessoltseva)
- 1991 - Viva Gardes-Marines! (Princess "Fiquet", future Empress Catherine the Great)
- 1992 - Gardes-Marines III (Princess "Fiquet", future Empress Catherine the Great)
- 1993 - Charity ball (Shirli)
- 1995 - Limit (Katya)
- 1997 - Dunno on the Moon (Zvyozdochka Voice)
- 1999 - Fara (Neznakomka (unknown woman))
- 1999 - Dunno on the Moon 2 (Zvyozdochka Voice)
- 2003 - The Snow Queen (Gerda)
- 2004 - Moscow Saga (Vera Gorda) TV-series
- 2007 - Lyubov-Morkov (Marina Golubeva) "Любовь-морковь" is the Russian idiom which literally translates as "Love-carrot". The English phrase "Lovey-dovey" has a close meaning.
- 2007 - Kingdom of Crooked Mirrors (Indian Woman)
- 2008 - Lyubov-Morkov 2 (Marina Golubeva)
- 2010 - Lyubov-Morkov 3 (Marina Golubeva)
- 2014 - The mystery of the four princesses (Queen Gurunda)
- 2018 - Cinderella (Socialite)
- 2022 - Midshipmen 1787. World (Catherine the Great)
- 2022 - Pregnancy test 3
- 2022 - Lyubov-Morkov 4 (Marina Golubeva)

== Theater ==
- 1995 – Ponedelnik posle chuda ("Igroki" theater) in the role Helen Keller
- 1997—2000 – Barishnia-krestianka (Yermolova Theatre) in the role Elizaveta Berestova
- 2001 – Dannaya (Théâtre de l'Estrade) in the role Frina
- 2018 - current – Dvoe na kocheliah ("Sovremennik Theater") in the role Gitel Moska

Awards
World Music Awards
Preceded by 1999 Philipp Kirkorov	Best-selling Russian artist 2000; Kristina Orbakaitė	Succeeded by 2001 Alsou
Preceded by 2001 Alsou	Best-selling Russian artist 2002; Kristina Orbakaitė	Succeeded by 2004 Philipp Kirkorov
