= Let's Go (march) =

Russian military march

В путь
- by Vasily Solovyov-Sedoi
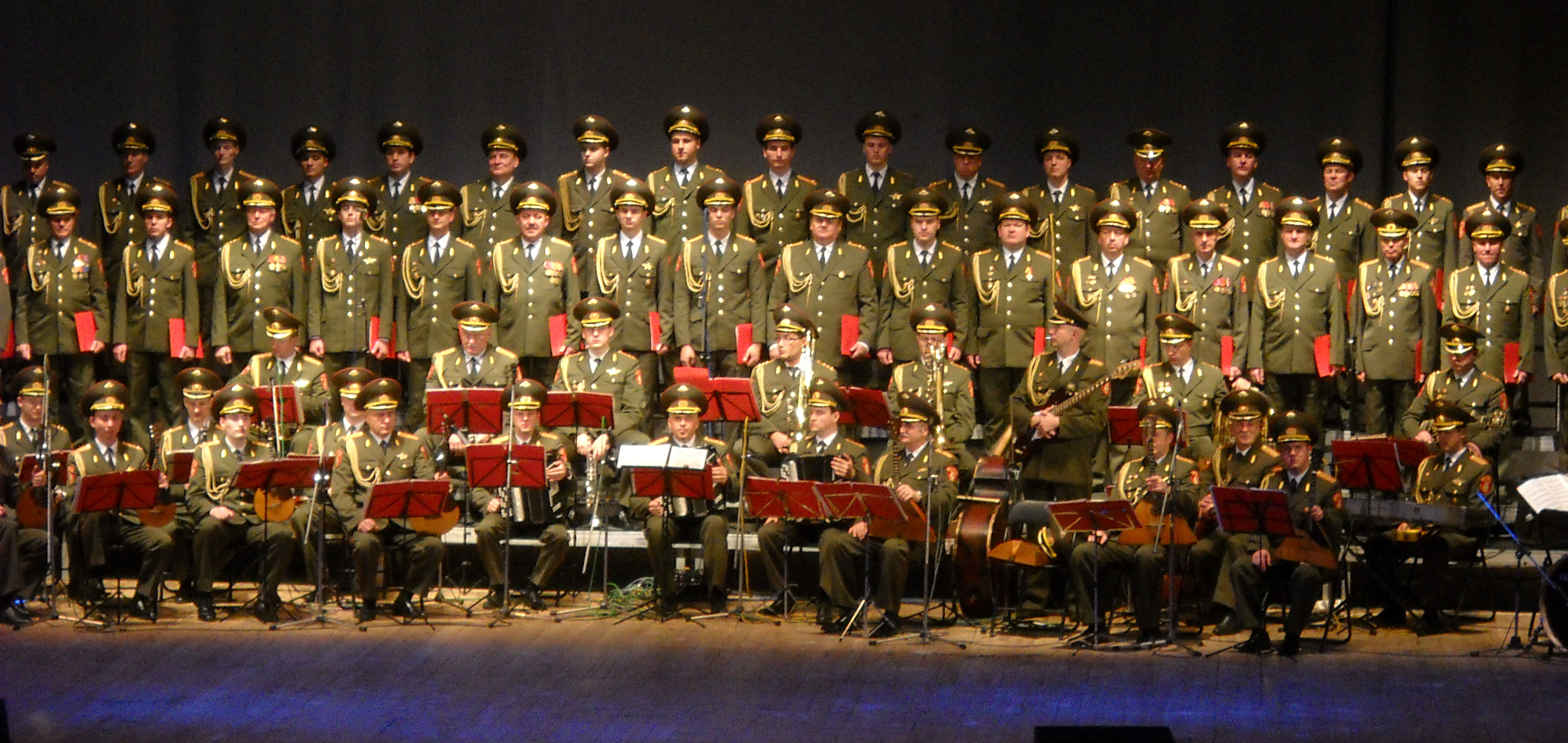
- The Alexandrov Ensemble is the most famous performer of the song
- English: Let's March
- Key: F♯ minor, A minor
- Written: 1954
- Text: Mikhail Dudin

"V put'" (Note: Either translated in English as 'Onwards', 'En route', or 'Let's go'.) (Russian: В путь, pronounced [f‿ˈputʲ]) is a song written in 1954 by Soviet composer Vasily Solovyov-Sedoi and poet Mikhail Dudin. It was originally written for the film Maksim Perepelitsa starring Leonid Bykov. The movie itself was released in 1955, and the song has achieved fame and popularity independently of it ever since. To this day it is still used as a so-called drill song (somewhat similar to a cadence call in the U.S. Army). In 1959, Vasily Solovyov-Sedoi received the Lenin Prize for this song.

"V put'" is performed on Victory Day as well as on other military holidays in Russia, Belarus and other former Soviet republics. This song has also been translated into German, Chinese and Korean (DPRK) versions. The German translation, sung by the Erich-Weinert-Ensemble, became the signature Nationale Volksarmee march, "Unterwegs".

== Lyrics ==
=== Russian original ===
Cyrillic script

Путь далёк у нас с тобою,
Веселей, солдат, гляди!
Вьётся, вьётся знамя полковое,
Командиры впереди.

Припев:
Солдаты, в путь, в путь, в путь!
А для тебя, родная,
Есть почта полевая.
Прощай! Труба зовёт,
Солдаты — в поход!

Каждый воин, парень бравый,
Смотрит соколом в строю.
Породнились мы со славой,
Славу добыли в бою.

Припев

Пусть враги запомнят это:
Не грозим, а говорим.
Мы прошли, прошли с тобой полсвета.
Если надо — повторим.

Припев

А теперь для нас настали
Дни учёбы и труда.
Год за годом только процветали
Наши сёла-города!

Припев

Romanization of Russian

Put' dalyok u nas s toboyu,
Veseley, soldat, glyadi!
Viotsya, viotsya znamya polkovoye,
Komandiry vperedi.

Pripev:
Soldaty, v put', v put', v put'!
A dlya tebya, rodnaya,
Yest' pochta polevaya.
Proshchay! Truba zovyot,
Soldaty — v pohod!

Kazhdyy voin, paren' bravyy,
Smotrit sokolom v stroyu.
Porodnilis' my so slavoy,
Slavu dobyli v boyu.

Pripev

Pust' vragi zapomnyat eto:
Ne grozim, a govorim.
My proshli, proshli s toboy polsveta.
Yesli nado — povtorim.

Pripev

A teper' dlya nas nastali
Dni uchyoby i truda.
God za godom tol'ko protsvetali
Nashi syola-goroda!

Pripev

IPA transcription (Note: See Help:IPA/Russian and Russian phonology.)

[pudʲ‿dɐˈlʲok ʊ‿ˈnas s‿tɐˈbo.jʊ ǀ]
[ˈvʲe.sʲɪ.lʲɪj sɐɫˈdad‿ɡlʲɪˈdʲi ǁ]
[ˈvʲjot.sɐ ˈvʲjot.sɐ ˈzna.mʲɐ pəɫ.kɐˈvo.jɪ ǀ]
[kə.mɐnˈdʲi.rɨ ˈfpʲe.rʲɪ.dʲɪ ǁ]

[prʲɪˈpʲef]
[sɐɫˈda.tɨ ǀ f‿ˈputʲ ǀ f‿ˈputʲ ǀ f‿ˈputʲ ǁ]
[ˈa dlʲə tʲɪˈbʲa rɐdˈna.jə ǀ]
[jesʲtʲ ˈpot͡ɕ.tə pɐ.lʲɪˈva.jə ǁ]
[prɐɕˈɕæj trʊˈba zɐˈvʲot ǀ]
[sɐɫˈda.tɨ ǀ f‿pɐˈxot ǁ]

[ˈkaʐ.dɨj ˈvo.(j)ɪn ˈpa.rʲɪnʲ ˈbra.vɨj ǀ]
[ˈsmo.trʲɪt ˈso.kə.ɫəm f‿strɐˈju ǁ]
[pə.rɐdˈnʲi.lʲɪsʲ mɨ sɐ ˈsɫa.vəj ǀ]
[ˈsɫa.vʊ dɐˈbɨ.lʲɪ v‿bɐˈju ǁ]

[prʲɪˈpʲef]

[ˈpustʲ vrɐˈɡʲi zɐˈpom.nʲət ˈɛ.tə ǀ]
[ˈnʲe grɐˈzʲim ˈa ɡə.vɐˈrʲim ǁ]
[mɨ prɐʂˈlʲi prɐʂˈlʲi s‿tɐˈboj pɐɫˈsvʲe.tə ǀ]
[ˈjes.lʲɪ ˈna.də ǀ pəf.tɐˈrʲim ǁ]

[prʲɪˈpʲef]

[ˈa‿tʲɪˈpʲerʲ dlʲɐ ˈnas nɐˈsta.lʲɪ ǀ]
[ˈdnʲi ʊˈt͡ɕo.bɨ ˈi trʊˈda ǁ]
[ˈgod‿zɐ ˈgo.dəm ˈtolʲ.kə ˈprət͡s.vʲɪˈta.lʲɪ ǀ]
[ˈna.ʂɨ ˌsʲo.ɫə.gə.rɐˈda ǁ]

[prʲɪˈpʲef]

=== English translation ===
I
We still have quite a long way to go,
Cheer up soldier, raise your head!
Regimental banners flutter, flutter,
Our commanders lead ahead.

Chorus:
Soldiers, let's march, march, march!
And as for you, my lover,
I'll write and send you letters.
Farewell! The bugle calls,
Hey soldiers — march on!

II
Every warrior, a brave lad,
Like a falcon in their ranks.
We have befriended ourselves with glory,
Gained in the heat of battle!

Chorus

III
Let our enemies hear this phrase,
Not a threat, but we will say:
Together we crossed half of the planet,
And we will do it again!

Chorus

IV
Upcoming for everybody:
Days of study and hard work!
Every single year, our villages
And cities have thrived!

Chorus
