= Private Ivan =

- Directed by: Ivan Lukinsky
- Written by: Georgi Mdivany
- Starring: Leonid Kharitonov; Sergei Blinnikov; Tatyana Pelttser; Anna Kolomiytseva; Vera Orlova
- Cinematography: Valery Ginsburg
- Edited by: Lidiya Zhuchkova
- Music by: Anatoli Lepin
- Production company: Gorky Film Studio
- Release date: 1955
- Running time: 93 minutes
- Country: Soviet Union
- Language: Russian

Private Ivan (Russian: Солдат Иван Бровкин, romanized: Soldat Ivan Brovkin) is a 1955 Soviet musical comedy film directed by Ivan Lukinsky. The picture was seen by 40 million viewers in the USSR. The film was followed by the sequel Ivan Brovkin on the State Farm in 1959.

== Plot ==
Hapless country boy Ivan Brovkin does not fit into the kolkhoz life. Anything which he attempts goes awry. When assigned by the chairman of the collective farm into the care and rehabilitation of the head of the garage Zakhar Silych, he even manages to drown the new kolkhoz truck GAZ-51.

And as soon as Ivan sinks the car he and three other kolkhoz guys receive a summons to the army.

In the first period of life, Ivan Brovkin manifests himself just like on the farm: does not know military discipline and lags in physical training. However, after discussion in the squad, he changes, starting to make progress in service, in handicrafts, gets the title of a Gefreiter, and in the end as a reward gets a ten-day home leave.

All the time Brovkin served he wrote letters to his lover - Lyubasha. But the letters were intercepted by accountant of the collective farm, Samohvalov, who wants to marry her. Lyubasha is vexed at Ivan because she does not know what he wrote to her. Arrived Brovkin calls Lyubasha from her home with a contingent nightingale whistle, as he used to before the army. Everything gets cleared up.

== Cast ==
- Leonid Kharitonov - Ivan Romanovich Brovkin
- Sergey Blinnikov - Timothy Kondratievich Koroteev
- Tatyana Pelttser - Evdokia Makarovna Brovkina, Ivan's mother
- Anna Kolomiytseva - Elizabeth Nikitichna, Koroteev's wife
- Daya Smirnova - Lyubasha, daughter of Koroteev
- Vera Orlova - Polina Kuzminichna Grebeshkova, barmaid
- Mikhail Pugovkin - Zahar Silich Peryoshkin, manager of the garage
- Yevgeny Shutov - Apollinaris Samohvalov Petrovich, collective farm accountant
- Tanat Zhaylibekov - Mukhtar Abaev, Ivan's friend, Corporal
- Boris Tolmazov - Nikolai Petrovich, commander of the battery

== Production ==
Kharitonov first starred in cinema in the year 1954, and his first role in the film "School of Courage" brought all-union fame to the student. The role of Ivan Brovkin came in third in the filmography of Kharitonov, who after the film's release became a superstar of Soviet cinema. During filming in the summer of 1955 in Sukhumi, Leonid Kharitonov was delayed by the military patrol on the street. The actor was in uniform preparing for his role, but was not dressed according to the ordinance, and entered into a dispute with a senior officer. He was taken to the office where the officer recognized him as the protagonist of "School of Courage."

When he was readying for filming, Kharitonov did combat training, learned to drive a tractor and a motorcycle. All the songs in the film he performed himself. During the filming Leonid Kharitonov suffered from an ulcer which manifested in him during the siege of Leningrad, where he suffered from undernourishment and consumed soap. Shooting of the military garrison occurred on the territory of the Chernyshevsky barracks in Moscow.

Rural nature was filmed in the village of Slobodka Savinova at Kalininsky (now Tver). Scenes set in summer were shot in fall and Kharitonov with Pugovkin had to swim in an icy river, and set designers had to tint the yellow foliage into green.

The movie script was allegedly plagiarized from the extremely similar comedy film "Maksim Perepelitsa" starring Leonid Bykov, which was made in the same year. Ivan Stadnyuk, the author of the original novel and scriptwriter for "Perepelitsa" movie later said that Georgi Mdivani, the "Private Ivan" scriptwriter, admitted to plagiarism in a private discussion with him.

== See also ==
- Maksim Perepelitsa
