= Troitske (disambiguation) =

Troitske is an urban-type settlement in the Svatove Raion of Luhansk Oblast, Ukraine.

Troitske may also refer to:

- Troitske, Sievierodonetsk Raion, a village in Luhansk Oblast, Ukraine
- Troitske, Kramatorsk Raion, a village in Donetsk Oblast, Ukraine
- Troitske, Yasynuvata Raion, a village in Donetsk Oblast, Ukraine
- Troitske, a village near Bila Tserkva, in Kyiv oblast, Ukraine
