= Vano Iantbelidze =

- ვანო იანტბელიძე
- Born: 14 January 1954 (age 72); Samtredia, Georgian SSR, USSR
- Occupation: Actor
- Years active: 1973–present
- Spouse: Pikria Kushitashvili
- Awards: Honored Artist of Georgia (1991)

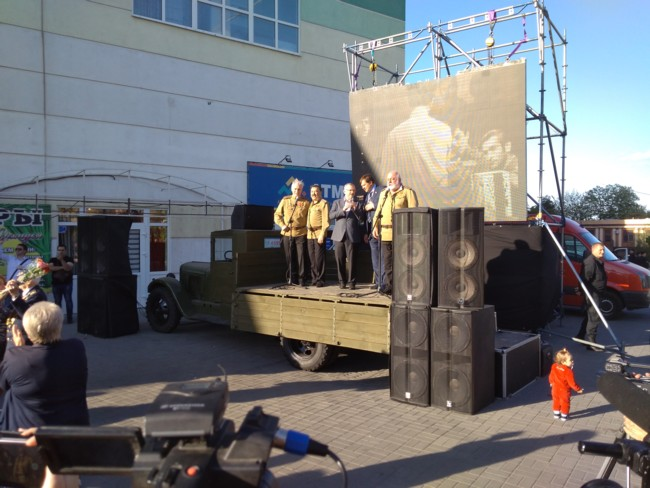

Ivane "Vano" Iantbelidze (Georgian: ვანო იანტბელიძე; born on January 14, 1954, in Samtredia, Georgian SSR) is a Soviet and Georgian film, television and stage actor.

== Life and career ==
Vano (Ivane) Iantbelidze was born January 14, 1954, in Samtredia, Georgian SSR (then a republic of the Soviet Union).

In 1971, he left secondary school.

Studying at the first year theatrical institute, Vano Iantbelidze debuted in Leonid Bykov's movie One-Two, Soldiers Were Going..., 1973). Further Bykov called Iantbelidze in the following movie "Only Old Men Are Going to Battle., 1976)".

In 1975, Vano Iantbelidze graduated Shota Rustaveli Theatre and Film University and in the same year became the actor of Telavi state drama theater on which scene he played more than 150 roles. Because of high employment on a theatrical scene further, the actor seldom appeared in cinema.

== Selected filmography ==
- 1973 — One-Two, Soldiers Were Going... as Vano Koderidze, "the hero without tiger skin"
- 1975 — Eleven hopes as Bregvadze
- 1976 — Only Old Men Are Going to Battle as Vano Kobakhidze, fighter pilot
- 1982 — The Sad Horn an episode
- 1984 — Snow over white gardens an episode
- 1992 — Paradise Under The Shade of Swords as Hasaykhan Utsmiyev, the officer of the Russian army
- 1995 — Resettlers (ხიზნები)
- 2006 — Two Khevsurians (ორი ხევსური, short) as Papakho Khan, old Khevsur
- 2015 — The Guard (Гвардія), Ukrainian mini-series as Guram Levidze, the owner of restaurant
