= Cherkaske settlement hromada =

Cherkaske settlement hromada Черкаська селищна громада
- Hromada
- Interactive map of Cherkaske settlement hromada
- Country: Ukraine
- Oblast: Donetsk Oblast
- Raion: Kramatorsk Raion

Area
  - Total: 294.6 km^{2} (113.7 sq mi)

Population (2020)
  - Total: 8,703
  - Density: 29.54/km^{2} (76.51/sq mi)
- Settlements: 11
- Rural settlements: 1
- Villages: 10

Cherkaske settlement hromada (Ukrainian: Черкаська селищна громада) is a hromada of Ukraine, located in Kramatorsk Raion, Donetsk Oblast. Its administrative center is the rural settlement of Cherkaske.

It has an area of 294.6 square kilometres (113.7 mi^{2}) and a population of 8,703, as of 2020.

The hromada includes 11 settlements: 1 rural settlement (Cherkaske) and 10 villages:

- Ivanivka
- Maidan
- Maiachka
- Novomykolaivka
- Novoselivka
- Oleksandrivka
- Prylisne
- Pryvillia
- Troitske
- Shnurky

== Demographics ==
As of the 2001 Ukrainian census, the hromada had a population of 11,116 inhabitants. The composition of the population by their native languages was as follows:

Native languages (2001)
	percent
Ukrainian	90.6%
Russian	8.8%
Belarusian	0.2%
Romani	0.1%
Armenian	0.1%
others	0.1%

== See also ==
- List of hromadas of Ukraine
