= Sigizmund =

Sigizmund may refer to:

- Sigizmund Kats (1908–1984), Soviet composer who specialized in writing popular songs
- Sigizmund Krzhizhanovsky (1887–1950), Russian and Soviet short-story writer
- Sigizmund Levanevsky (1902–1937), Soviet aircraft pilot of Polish origin and a Hero of the Soviet Union
