= Only "Old Men" Are Going Into Battle =

1973 film

- Directed by: Leonid Bykov
- Screenplay by: Leonid Bykov; Yevgeni Onopriyenko; Aleksandr Satsky
- Produced by: Nikolay Zlochevsky; Ilya Fidman
- Starring: Leonid Bykov
- Cinematography: Vladimir Voytenko
- Edited by: M. Zorovoy
- Music by: Viktor Shevchenko
- Production company: Dovzhenko Film Studios
- Release date: 1973
- Running time: 92 min
- Country: Soviet Union (Ukrainian SSR)
- Languages: Russian, Ukrainian

Only "Old Men" Are Going Into Battle (Russian: «В бой идут одни "старики"», romanized: V boy idut odni "stariki"; Ukrainian: «У бій йдуть одні "старі"» (Note: one of the meanings of the Russian and Ukrainian idiom 'old man' is 'the most experienced person')) is an iconic 1973 Soviet war comedy-drama black-and-white film produced in the USSR about World War II fighter pilots, written and directed by Leonid Bykov, who also played the lead role as the squadron commander.

Screenplay by Leonid Bykov, Yevgen Onopriyenko and Alexander Satsky. Original music by Viktor Shevchenko, cinematography by Vladimir Voytenko. Runtime 92 min. Production by Dovzhenko Film Studios.

The title comes from two scenes in the film, where the squadron is facing very difficult dogfights with German fighter planes, so only experienced "old men" are sent up, while those fresh from flying school have to wait on the ground together with the mechanics. Soon, of course, the newcomers have replaced most of those veterans and have become "old men" themselves, taking to the skies while a new group of newcomers wait on the ground with the mechanics.

== Plot ==
The film combines two storylines: the main war drama plot runs in parallel with vivid artistic performance — the fighter squadron doubles as an amateur musical group during rest time, led by its enthusiastic commander turned conductor.

The movie begins in the late summer of 1943 during the Battle of the Dnieper.

The pilots of the 2nd Squadron of the Fighter Aircraft Guard Regiment are returning from a mission. However, the commanding officer, captain Titarenko, also known as "Maestro," is missing. Nobody (except for Makarych, the technician) even hopes he survived, since he didn't even have enough fuel, but then suddenly a German Messerschmitt Bf 109 shows up and lands on the airfield. It turns out that Maestro was shot down behind enemy lines, however, advancing Soviet infantry saved him and he received a war trophy aircraft on an advance airfield.

The next day the reinforcements come to the regiment and are assigned to the squadrons. Several newcomers, including Second Lieutenant Aleksandrov and Third Lieutenants Shchedronov and Sagdullayev, ask for a place in the 2nd Squadron. Titarenko inquires about their musical skills: 2nd Squadron is also known as the "Singing Squadron," as during free time they perform as an amateur orchestra with the commander himself acting as conductor. Shchedronov sings «Darkie», earning the corresponding nickname.

Having only had a brief chat with the reinforcements, the "old men" take off to intercept a group of German bombers. Experienced pilots don't allow the newcomers with them, saying only "you’ll have your share of fighting soon enough:" they know that the new pilots have only received basic training due to a shortened curriculum and are not battle-ready.

They all return to the airfield safely, however, Maestro is furious: his wingman, First Lieutenant Skvortzov, left the battle permission, and it appears he did so not for the first time. They have a serious discussion and it turns out that during the Battle of Kursk Skvortzov had barely survived an encounter with a German ace pilot and since then has had a subconscious fear of dogfights. Depressed Skvortzov asks to be released from active duty and to be enlisted to an infantry regiment instead, however, Titarenko burns the report, deciding to give his friend another chance.

In between missions, the 2nd Squadron rehearses performances. Even Aleksandrov, despite his aversion to music, plays the tambourine and soon begins to run the rehearsals in lieu of the captain.

Eventually, the newcomers are allowed to fly. Aleksandrov crash lands his aircraft, destroying it in the process and receives a strict reprimand from the captain. However, he doesn't take it seriously and light-heartedly goes to the field to catch some grasshoppers. Enraged Titarenko suspends the lieutenant from flying and puts him on "eternal airfield duty," while the rest of the officers give Aleksandrov the nickname Grasshopper."

Titarenko leaves on a reconnaissance mission on a trophy Messerschmitt. In his absence, a light bomber Polikarpov Po-2, piloted by female officers Zoya and Masha, makes a forced landing on the airfield. Sagdullayev promptly falls in love with Masha, earning himself the nickname "Romeo."

Titarenko, who has returned from his recon mission, confirms that a large group of German tanks is nearby. When he decides the new reinforcements (except for Grasshopper) are battle-ready, he performs another reconnaissance flight. He finds out that the Germans have camouflaged their tanks with hay bales and sheds, but he's shot down on his way back. Maestro is saved by an allied infantry, which, however, mistakes him for a German pilot. They aren't persuaded by his Soviet uniform nor by his fluency in Russian, and attempt to lynch him. However, when an infantryman slaps Titarenko in the face, he punches the soldier back, knocking him to his knees and answering using mat — reassuring the rest of the soldiers, who are sure that a German wouldn't know the lexis so well.

The infantrymen gift the captain a horse, which he uses to get back to the airfield. Having returned, he learns from Makarych that during his absence Darkie has been killed: he was practicing cooperative actions with his partner and was shot down by a Focke-Wulf Fw 190 ace.

In the meantime, Romeo confesses his love to Masha.

Titarenko joins CPSU and receives a task to lead the newcomers by example and to demonstrate to them the vulnerability of Göring's ace pilots. Maestro challenges the Germans to a "joust," but at the very beginning of the fight he decides that this is the last opportunity for his wingman to prove himself. Titarenko feigns a weapon malfunction, putting himself in a mortal peril, and Skvortzov overcomes his fear and comes to the rescue, shooting down one of the enemy aircraft.

The next day, German air forces perform a raid on the airfield. Still suspended from flights, Grasshopper steals the commander's fighter, takes off and shoots down an enemy aircraft, saving the base.

The squadron gives a performance, which, among others, is attended by female pilots from a nearby regiment. Skvortzov performs the song Moonlight Night. The next day he performs a suicide ramming attack, directing his flaming aircraft at an enemy railway.

More time passes. The USSR territory is almost completely liberated from German occupation. The «old men» are preparing for battle, however, this now includes Romeo (First Lieutenant, Maestro's wingman) and Grasshopper (First Lieutenant, 2nd Squadron commander), while Maestro himself is now a major and a regiment commander. Fifteen minutes before takeoff, Romeo asks Maestro's permission to get married (since both he and Masha could be shot down any day) which Maestro gives right away. Once again the "old men" take off, and the newcomers from the reinforcements are left on the airfield.

The regiment returns from the mission, but it turns out that Romeo is heavily wounded. He manages to make it to the airfield and lands safely, but succumbs to his wounds right afterwards. When Maestro, Makarych and Grasshopper go to the female regiment to deliver the sad news to Masha, they learn that both Masha and Zoya were also killed that day. Makarych and Titarenko locate the women's graves and promise to return here and sing "Darkie" once again "from the beginning to the end" once the war is over.

== Cast ==
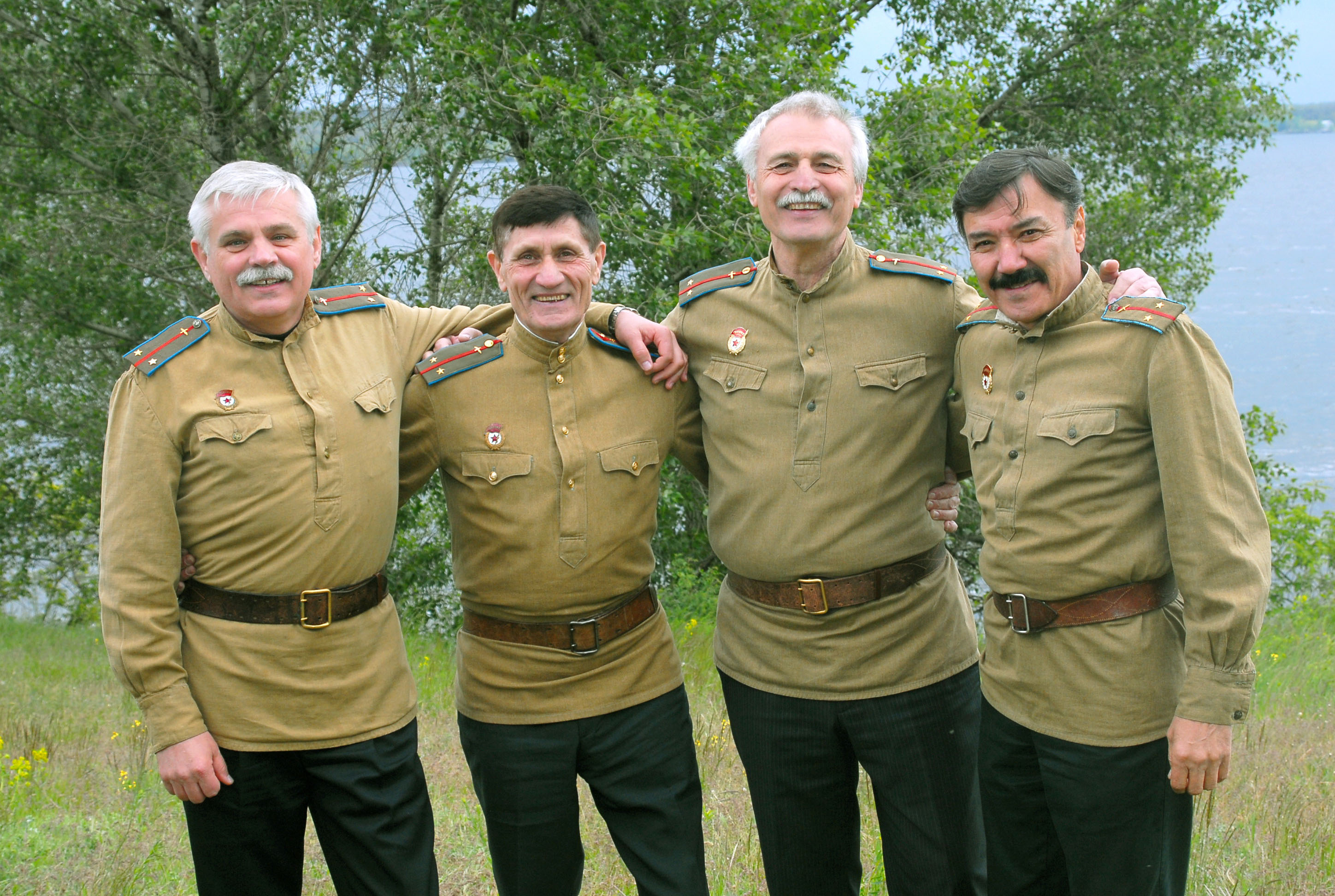
Cast of Only «Old Men» Are Going Into Battle 35 years later (2008): Nemchenko, Fedorinsky, Pashchenko, and Sagdullaev

- Leonid Bykov as Alexey «Maestro» Titarenko, commander of the 2nd Singing squadron
- Sergey Podgorny as Victor «Darkie» Shchedronov, fighter pilot
- Sergei Ivanov as «Grasshopper» Aleksandrov, fighter pilot
- Rustam Sagdullayev as «Romeo» Sagdullayev, fighter pilot
- Yevgeniya Simonova as Masha, female bomber navigator
- Olga Mateshko as Zoya, female bomber pilot
- Vladimir Talashko as Sergey Skvortzov, fighter pilot, Maestro's wingman and best friend
- Aleksei Smirnov as Makarych, Maestro's technician
- Viktor Miroshnichenko as Ivan "Pop" Ermakov, the fighter regiment commander
- Alim Fedorinsky as Alyabyev, fighter pilot
- Vano Yantbelidze as Vano Kobahidze, fighter pilot
- Oleksandr Nemchenko as Ivan Fedorovich, fighter pilot
- Viloriy Pashchenko as Vorobyev, fighter pilot
- Gregory Hlady as fighter pilot of 1st squadron
- Vladimir Volkov as political officer
- Dmitry Mirgorodskiy as infantry captain
- Yuri Sarantsev as Air Division commander
- Valentin Grudinin as chief of Air Army intelligence department
- Alexandr Milutin as fighter pilot

== Script and production ==
Leonid Bykov's childhood dream of becoming a pilot inspired his making of the film. Bykov tried to enroll in flight school, but was not accepted due to low (at that time) growth. In collaboration with two screenwriters — Evgeny Onoprienko and Alexander Satsky — he wrote a script based on the true events of the Great Patriotic War, but using the method of "artistic synthesis", bringing together these events, which in reality took place separately, in different aviation units flying on different types of aircraft.

Many characters have received real prototypes. Several people became prototypes of Captain Titarenko at once: the commander of the 270th Fighter Aviation Regiment, Hero of the Soviet Union, Major Vasily Merkushev, twice Hero of the Soviet Union Vitaly Popkov, Hero of the Soviet Union Ivan Laveykin, and the surname Titarenko and the call sign "Maestro" were taken by Bykov in honor of Dmitry Titorenko, the wingman of a thrice Hero The Soviet Union Ivan Kozhedub, episodes from whose biography were included in the film. Vano also appeared in the script in memory of a front-line friend and the first direct commander of Kozhedub at the front, a brave Georgian pilot, Junior Lieutenant Vano Gabunia, who heroically died when ramming a German Bf 109 fighter.

It is believed that the prototype of the "Darkie" was Viktor Shchevronok, a childhood friend of Leonid Bykov, with whom they entered flight school together, and who died in April 1945 during the liberation of Czechoslovakia. However, the family of cavalryman Viktor Shchedranov, who died in April 1945, lived near the house of the Bykov family.

The prototype of Zoya was Hero of the Soviet Union Nadezhda Popova, deputy squadron commander of the 46th Guards Women's Night Bomber Regiment. The scene of getting to know the girls, when the pilots are surprised to discover that the guests have more orders and medals than they do, really took place, and the doll in military uniform (which is held by one of the girls) was at the navigator of the women's regiment of night bombers Galina Dokutovich. Unlike her heroine, Nadezhda Popova went through the entire war and later married the Hero of the Soviet Union Semyon Kharlamov, who acted as the main consultant of the film. Vitaly Popkov (who used to make low turns over the airfield in front of the girls) and Guard Lieutenant Boris Kiselyov became the prototypes of Lieutenant Alexandrov ("Grasshopper").

The story is largely based on the memoirs of the Soviet fighter ace Vitaly Popkov who fought with a real-life singing squadron boasting its own amateur choir. The squadron even toured the Soviet rear with concerts and received fighter planes built with money donated by Soviet star musicians (Leonid Utesov, for example). In the liberated territories, the choir gave concerts that were very popular, and in 1944, in Kramatorsk, Leonid Bykov, as a teenager, visited one of these gigs. On that day, local teenagers thanked the pilots with their own concert, and Bykov was part of the choir. In addition, the memories of the Sergey Lugansky, twice Hero of the Soviet Union Arseny Vorozheykin, twice Hero of the Soviet Union Vladimir Lavrinenkov and Honored Pilot of the USSR Anatoly Ivanov were also used.

Most of the elder cast and production members fought in the war themselves. Actor Aleksei Smirnov (Makarych) was a decorated war hero, an artillery sergeant; also a battlefield amateur musician as well. Bykov gave the patronymic "Makarych" to Smirnov's character the same as the actor actually had.

The drawing of the sheet music on the fuselage of the Maestro fighter was made by analogy with the Il-2 attack aircraft of Vasily Emelianenko, who served in the 230 aviation regiment. There was also a tragic love story of an Uzbek pilot (real surname — Marisaev) and a Georgian girl; the mechanic's habit of crossing planes before departure; the Maestro being captured by his own and the phrase "I would, comrade commander, even more I shot down the Krauts, but you scared away all of them with your underwear." Veterans of a special separate 434th fighter regiment claimed that the episode from the film when Titarenko returns to the regiment after a battle not on an airplane, but on a horse ("waved without looking!") was taken from real life: a pilot from their regiment, Alexander Alexandrov, was shot down near Stalingrad and returned at night on horseback. Similarly, veterans of the 1st Guards Aviation Division said that when the film shows how Titarenko discovers German tanks disguised under haystacks, it means their comrade-in—arms and commander - Hero of the Soviet Union Guard Major Stepan Prutkov.

=== Leonid Bykov about the film ===
Why did we choose pilots as heroes? It's hard to say. Maybe because I myself studied at an aviation school, dreamed of flying and still admire the representatives of this heroic profession. Talking to the pilots, the participants of the battles, we realized one very important thing for us. In the cruel crucible of war, in its merciless flame, the older experienced comrades sought, where possible, to save young and inexperienced falcons. This was the highest wisdom — caring for the future, the eternal right and duty of the strong to protect, raise and educate — their own shift. So the theme "Only "old men" go into battle" was born. And the other one is no less dear to us. Well-known wisdom says: "When the guns speak, the muses are silent." We wanted to prove that in the years of trials, those who remain people in the most cruel conditions win, who take everything bright and human with them into battle, for which they fight the enemy. And what could be more beautiful than music? It is not for nothing that the heroes of the "2nd singing squadron" like to repeat: "Wars are transitory, music is eternal!" Our heroes opposed the malice, misanthropy of fascism with high humanism, the creative creative principle inherent in man. We wanted to create this film in memory of those who did not return from the war, and in gratitude to the living who survived this brutal battle. Therefore, with special trepidation and excitement, we show our picture to war veterans. And the best reward for us is when they say, "Yes, it was like that."

— Leonid Bykov

== Filming ==
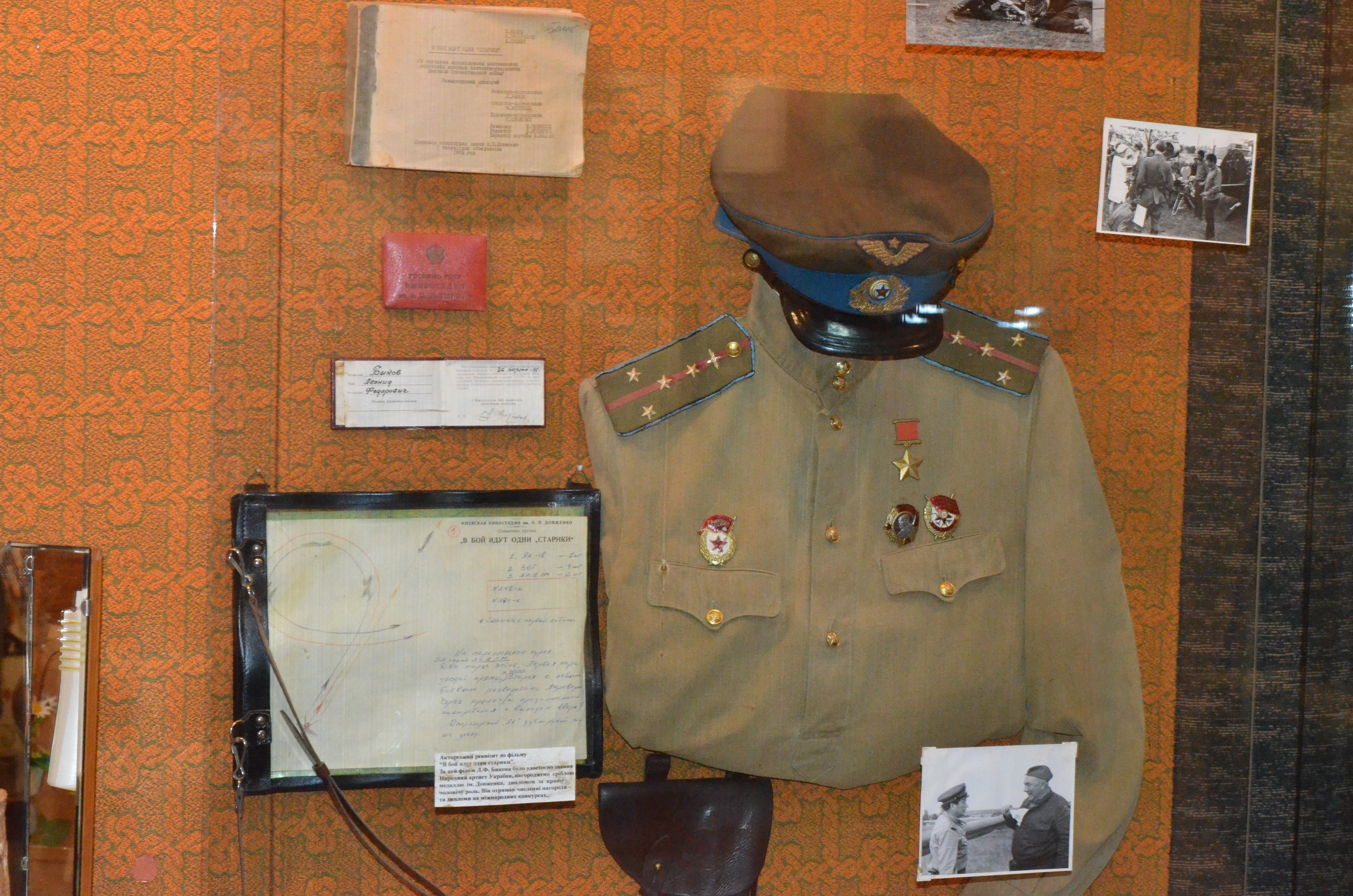
Props from the film in the Museum of the history of the city of Kramatorsk.

A great help in working on the film was provided by Air Marshal, three times Hero of the Soviet Union Alexander Pokryshkin, who at one time served in Kiev for 10 years and visited the Dovzhenko Film Studios more than once. Bykov had already asked Pokryshkin to allocate real wartime aircraft for filming, but the marshal initially treated this request warily, since many "passing" films about the war were released in those years. After reviewing the script literally overnight, Pokryshkin ordered to give the film crew five planes at once. Po-2 was allocated to the film crew by the head of the Gagarin Air Force Academy, Air Marshal Sergei Rudenko.

Filming began on May 22, 1973. At the end of May, filming of aerial combat scenes began.

The pilot wrote out "barrels" and "dead loops" in the sky, and Leonid Fedorovich turned on the camera, pressed the trigger and shouted into the lens: "Serega, cover me! I'm attacking!" After a few takes, the plane would land, I would change the cassette with the film, and the car would rise into the sky again. At the end of the shooting day, Bykov literally fell out of the plane and plopped down on the green grass of the airfield. "Well, how are you?" — I asked, running up to him, and heard in response: "Let's develop the film — we'll see!"

— Vital Kondratiev, cinematographer

In early September, the final scene was filmed, in which Maestro, Makarych and Grasshopper find Masha and Zoya's grave. The emotional severity of the scene turned out to be excessive for Alexey Smirnov. During the rehearsal, the actor grabbed his heart and was taken away by an ambulance. A few days later, Smirnov returned and said that "I won't be able to do this a second time, I'll just die," after which Leonid Bykov left that take in the film.

Actor Vano Iantbelidze recalls the very warm and friendly atmosphere on the set and Leonid Bykov's fatherly attitude to young actors:

Just imagine, I just turned 18, I just entered the first year of the theater institute, and suddenly [got] an invitation to act. I was worried that I didn't know how to drive a plane! I didn't know anything about the profession! I thought: if I'm going to play a pilot, then I should be able to fly right away… And here I am in Kiev. They meet me with a car! They are settling in the hotel! Everything is spinning around me! They lead to make-up, the costume is selected. Such a sweet feeling: everyone is glad to see you, life is wonderful ahead! And we became friends. We were bored, if we left, we carried gifts to each other. I brought chacha, Rustam — melons. I remember meeting Rustam Sagdullayev in Boryspil, and he throws thirty melons down from the ladder! The episode was filmed when the hero Bykov was shot down. We ran, hugged, kissed him and cried with happiness that he was near. Do you understand? They didn't cry for the hero, as it was written in the script, but for the person. How much he told us then about life, about art! As he spoke to his children…

According to Rustam Sagdullayev, three directors changed during the filming of the tape, and each of them tried to interfere with the workflow. But despite these difficulties, there was an atmosphere of friendliness and mutual understanding on the set. Bykov asked the young actors not to learn the roles by heart, but to speak in their own words. According to the director, the prototypes of the film's heroes "flew away, and many did not return. But they didn't know about it. They lived the same way, loved the same way, laughed the same way, jumped the same way" as those who played them in the movie.

The film was coldly received by the Ministry of Culture of Ukrainian SSR; they wanted to ban the film. Vitaly Popkov recalled:

The minister persists: what kind of film is this, people don't return from combat missions, they die, and the remaining sing songs. And he summarizes: this did not happen at the front and could not have happened. I ask the minister: was he at the front himself? The logic of the official is amazing: he was not, but he knows. And then I told the minister that I had flown on one of the two planes bought and donated to our regiment from Utesov Jazz Ensemble. And that Leonid Osipovich and his musicians came to our airfield, and we played and sang together. Convinced. He was probably influenced not so much by my arguments as by the general's epaulettes and two heroic Stars...

== Songs ==
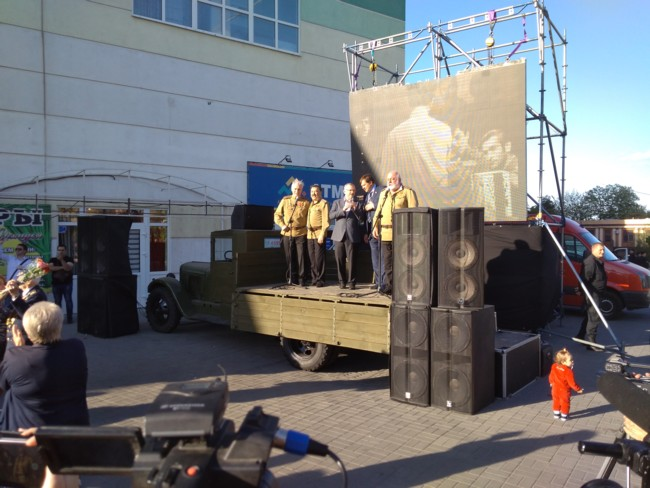
The actors of the film performing in Melitopol, 2018.

The "calling card" of the film is the song "Smuglyanka" ("Darkie"). Leonid Bykov told Vladimir Talashko that he had wanted to include this song in the film since childhood. As a teenager, Bykov and his friends rode on the running boards of passing goods wagons. In one of these wagons, he saw a pilot, an infantryman and an artilleryman who were traveling from the front through Donbass and singing "Darkie". "And at that moment I decided that if I make a movie about pilots, it will definitely sound there," Bykov said. At the beginning of the film, "Darkie" is performed by the singer Murad Sadykov.

Songs "Evening Bell", "What a Moonlit Night" (performed by Nikolai Kondratyuk), "Roads...", "For That Guy" (performed by Lev Leshchenko), "In the Dugout" and tango "Wearied Sun" are also in the film. Some of the songs were sung by the actors themselves.

In 2020, Rustam Sagdullaev was among performers of "Smuglyanka" for the #10ПЕСЕНПОБЕДЫ project.

== Awards ==
The film won most of the Soviet bloc film prizes at the time, including the first prize in the 7th All-Union Film Festival in Baku in 1974 and Taras Shevchenko State Prize of the Ukrainian SSR in 1977.

== Colorization ==
Initially, Leonid Bykov wanted to make a film in color, but he was not given the then scarce color film. However, after reviewing the final version, Bykov decided that the black-and-white version of the film turned out to be more realistic.

By 2009, the film was colorized and restored, the military chronicle in the film was cleaned of scratches and color was also given to it. The director of the colorization is Igor Lopatonok. During colorization, nothing was removed or added. "The picture before the frame corresponds to the source material,— I. Lopatonok emphasized. "I am legally responsible for this". When colorizing, they tried to reproduce the colors of the Soviet film of 1973. The specific complexity of the picture was represented by the abundance of shades of green (up to 27 in one frame). In addition, 60% of the finished work had to be redone due to incorrect clearance on the shoulder straps of the pilots' field uniforms.

In 2009 a colorized version was released for TV and DVD. The premiere took place on Channel One Russia and Ukraine TV channel on May 9, 2009 in honor of Victory Day. A screening of the film for veterans was also held at the cinema of the Dovzhenko Film Studio. The release resulted in a legal battle in Ukrainian courts between the copyright owners, Leonid Bykov's daughter and Ukrainian Dovzhenko Film Studios, and the company behind the colorization, as the copyright owners claim that the colorization has been done against the wishes of Bykov, who intentionally chose to do the film in black and white, in order to match newly shot scenes with the newsreel material in the film. In May 2011, the District Court of Kyiv ruled that the colorization was a breach of copyright and that the colorized version can't be shown or rented in Ukraine. The director re-worked the film's script to suit being shot in black and white after being denied color film stock on the grounds that color film was reserved for films about socialist realism.

== Honours ==
- In Kyiv, there is a monument to Leonid Bykov, who is depicted in the image of a Maestro sitting on the wing of his plane. A small grasshopper is sitting by his foot.
- In 2011, a monument to the mechanic Makarych was unveiled in Kharkiv.
- In 2015, the Ulyanovsk Automobile Plant released a limited series of the UAZ Hunter SUV dedicated to the 70th anniversary of Victory in the Great Patriotic War and the completion of production of this model. On board these cars, airbrushing was performed, similar to the drawing on the fuselage of Titarenko's aircraft.
- In 2016, in Ulyanovsk, as part of the celebration of the 70th anniversary of Victory in the Great Patriotic War in the Year of Russian Cinema, a mural depicting the characters of the film was created at No. 70 on the Avenue of the Creators.
- On May 6, 2018, a monument to Alexei Smirnov in the image of a mechanic Makarych was unveiled at the Levtsovo airfield in the Yaroslavl region.
- In 2020, a memorial plaque with the image of Alexey Smirnov in the image of the mechanic Makarych and the phrase "Let's live" was installed at the Lenfilm film studio.
- The tombstone complex on the grave of Vitaly Popkov at the Novodevichy Cemetery contains a phrase from the movie "Let's live."
