= Leonid Kharitonov (actor) =

Soviet actor (1930–1987)

- Born: Leonid Vladimirovich Kharitonov; 19 May 1930; Leningrad, Soviet Union
- Died: 20 June 1987 (aged 57); Moscow, Soviet Union
- Occupation: actor
- Years active: 1954–1986
- Spouse(s): (1) Svetlana Kharitonova, actress (1942–2004) (2) Gemma Osmolovskaya (1938), actress (3) Yeugenia Gibova (1942–2004), drama student

Leonid Vladimirovich Kharitonov (Russian: Леонид Владимирович Харитонов; 1930–1987) was a Soviet and Russian theatre and film actor. He played in the films Private Ivan, Ivan Brovkin on the State Farm and Street Full of Surprises. Honored Artist of the RSFSR (1972).

== Life ==
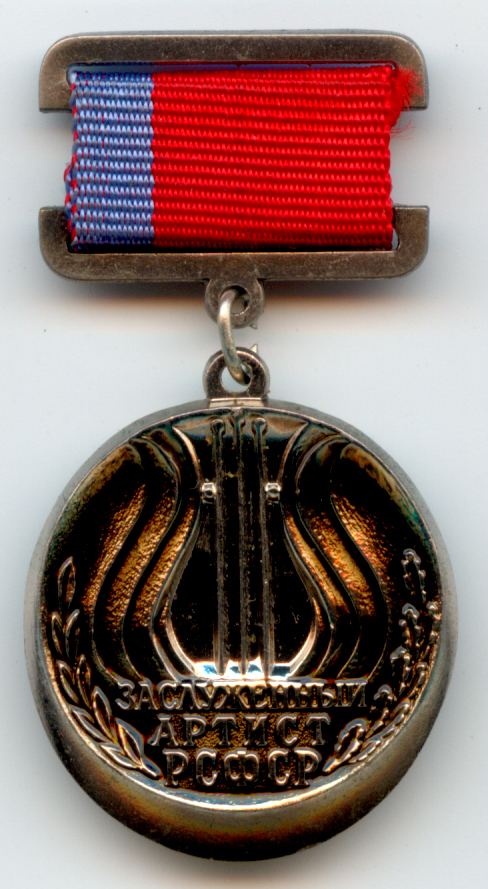
Leonid Kharitonov was an Honored Artist of the RSFSR

He was born in Leningrad on 19 May 1930, and died in Moscow on 20 June 1987, aged 57.

=== Career ===
==== Training ====
In early life he was ambivalent about an acting career. Although he took part in amateur productions, and in the ninth grade applied to theatre school, he nevertheless chose to study law for a year at university, while continuing theatrical performance in his spare time. "In the play The Inspector, he rocked the entire city of Leningrad; he played Bobchinsky and it was after this role that he again seriously considered an acting career." That summer, the Moscow Art School toured in Leningrad and offered auditions at his school. Kharitonov secretly attended, and was accepted.

==== Overview of acting career ====
He graduated from the Nemirovich-Danchenko studio school at the Moscow Art Theatre in 1954. This was the Gorky Art Academic Theatre. After graduating from the studio school he continued working as an actor at the same theatre. He was an actor with the Academic Art Theatre in the name of M. Gorky, or Gorky Theatre, from 1954 to 1962, but then he left this theatre and in 1962–1963 he performed with the Theatre of Lenin Komsomol and with the Pushkin Theatre. But in 1963 he returned to the Gorky Art Academic Theatre. He was a film actor from 1954: his first role was Boris Gorikov in the movie School of Courage, while he was still an acting student.

==== Early career and characterisations ====
In 1955, Kharitonov became a public idol after Private Ivan was screened throughout the country. He was the object of much fan mail, and appeared privately to many local audiences in clubs, schools, factories and stadia. "His fame was such that the actor could not walk down the street." Kharitonov was a multi-dimensional performer who created a new type of Russian cinematic character: the charming bad egg, which he developed in his characterisations of Brovkin, the policeman Vasya Shaneshkin and his later heroic characters. "It was skill, hard work, professionalism and above all perception which allowed this sophisticated actor to play so convincingly this simple country boy, Brovkin." Much of this was the effect of his training with the psychological acting school of MAT. Private Ivan was followed in 1958 by Ivan Brovkin on the State Farm (see critical commentary below).

==== Later career ====
With age, Kharitonov appeared in fewer films; he did not relish playing older men. However, sometimes he did appear in later movies grey and stout. For this reason of gradual absence from movies, in the 1980s Leonid Kharitonov was almost forgotten as a film actor although he continued performing at his native Moscow Art Theatre, as he had done almost all his acting life.

=== Private life ===
In private life he was said to live modestly. He was married three times, first to Svetlana Kharitonov the character actress of the 1950s and 1960s. He met his second wife, the actress Gemma Osmolovskaya, on the set of The Street is Full of Surprises, and they had a son Alexei Khartionov who is now a scientist-programmer. His third wife was his student at the Moscow Art Theatre school.

==== Illness ====
In later years Kharitonov was seriously ill. In the summer of 1980, during the Moscow Olympics, he suffered a first stroke. Then, while filming From the Life of the Chief of Criminal Investigation on 4 July 1984 this was followed by a second stroke. His health could not bear the news of the crisis of the Moscow Art Theatre in the summer of 1987. On 20 June 1987, the day of its division into two parts which was a very hard and dramatic time for the theatre, Kharitonov died the same day from his third stroke which occurred in the drama theatre. He was buried in Moscow in plot number 50 of Vagankovskoye cemetery.

== Theatrical performances ==
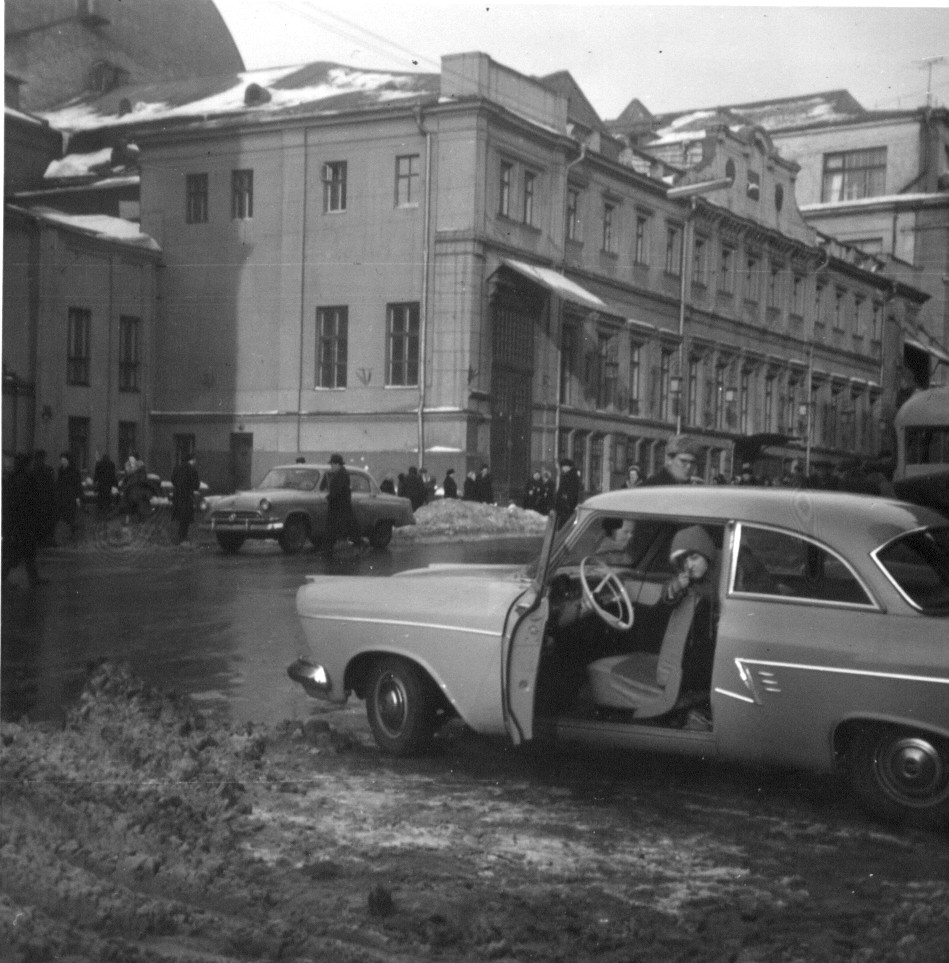
Moscow Art Theatre as Kharitonov knew it, in 1959

The following is a selection of Kharitonov's theatrical roles:

- The Forgotten Friend (1956) – Gosh
  The Pickwick Papers (1956) – Joe
  The Lower Depths (1956) – Alyosha
  The Devil's Disciple (1957) – Christy
  The road through the Sokolniki (1958) – Aleshka Vronsky – image
  Three Fat Men (1961) – Dr. Gaspar
  Mutiny (1977) – Caravan
  So we will win! (1981) – Fist
  We, the undersigned – Explorer
  The Village Stepanchikovo – Evgraf Ezhevikin
  Peace to the huts, war to the palaces
  Days of the Turbins – Lariosik
  Goodbye, boys – Sasha Krieger
  Dead Souls – Chichikov
  House number 6
  As he left, look – Fedor

== Filmography ==
The following is a selection of his films:

He was a supporting actor in Vasyok Trubachyov i yego tovarishchi (1955) and the romance Otryad Trubachyova srazhayetsya (1957). He played Fedul VI in Fire, Water, and Brass Pipes (1968). He played the part of Dobchinsky in the comedy Incognito from St. Petersburg (1977). In 1979 he acted in Moscow Does Not Believe in Tears, and A Few Days from the Life of I. I. Oblomov. In Moscow Does Not Believe in Tears he appears in cameo as himself, as part of the setting for the character Rudolf (Yuri Vasilyev) who is a television cameraman and first lover of the protagonist Ekaterina (Vera Alentova). Kharitonov was at that time ubiquitous on Soviet television, and therefore represented the contemporary celebrity media zeitgeist. This cameo part is not unimportant, as director Vladimir Menshov said: "The uniqueness of the movie Moscow does not believe in tears lies in the fact that there are no bit parts."

He played the Tsar in Along Unknown Paths(1982). He acted in: Iz Zhizni Nachalnika Ugolovnogo Rozyska (1983); Auktsion (1983); Postoronnim Vkhod Razreshyon (1986); Khorosho Sidim! (1986). He was also in the movie New Year's Abduction which featured the song Dark-Eyed Cossack Girl, publicised by his namesake and friend the bass singer Leonid Kharitonov.

=== Full filmography ===
Poster showing Leonid Kharitonov in Ivan Brovkin na tseline (1958). The poster provides identification of Leonid Kharitonov, while no other image of him is available. It also provides an example of how as a young man he was frequently cast in a military role.

- 1954 Courage School (Boris Gorik)
- 1955 Vasek trumpeter and his comrade (counsellor Mitya Bourtsev)
- 1955 Private Ivan (Russian: Солдат Иван Бровкин) (Ivan Brovkin) - image
- 1955 Son (Andrew Goriaev) - image
- 1956 Good luck! (Andrey Averin)
- 1957 Next to us (laid off workers)
- 1957 Detachment Trubacheva fight (counsellor Mitya Bourtsev)
- 1957 Street Full of Surprises (Vasya Shaneshkin)
- 1959 Ivan Brovkin on the State Farm (Ivan Brovkin na tseline) (Ivan Brovkin)
- 1960 Let Light (TV film, Efimkov)
- 1961 Long day (Lesch, excavator)
- 1961 Two lives (shoemaker)
- 1962 How to make toast (short, Grechkin)
- 1962 Kapron network (Valka, captain of the river tug Swan)
- 1963 Pitiable fate (short)
- 1964 All for you (Vorobushkin)
- 1967 Places still here (naval)
- 1968 Fire, Water, and Brass Pipes (Fedulov VI)
- 1969 Robbery (TV)
- 1969 New Year's Abduction (Новогоднее похищение)
- 1972 Fakir hour (Trofim)
- 1977 Incognito from St. Petersburg (Dobchinsky)
- 1978 Incidental passengers (companion to the mixed feed)
- 1978 Vanity of vanities (James A.)
- 1979 Moscow Does Not Believe in Tears (Russian: Москва слезам не верит; translit. Moskva slezam ne verit) (Leonid Kharitonov)
- 1979 A Few Days from the Life of I. I. Oblomov (Russian: Несколько дней из жизни И. И. Обломова) (Luka Savich)
- 1979 Father and Son (Dorofeyka)
- 1980 Houses for forest (Bogomolov)
- 1980 Gigolo and Gigoletta
- 1981 Charm with secrets (baleen whales)
- 1982 Young Russia (Longinov)
- 1982 Along Unknown Paths (Tsar Makar)
- 1982 Charodei (Russian: Чародеи) (Amatin)
- 1983 Auction (Yegorych)
- 1983 Eternal Call (Yegor Kuzmich Dedyukhin)
- 1983 Quarantine (military in the zoo)
- 1983 From the life: head of criminal investigations (grandfather Stepan)
- 1985 Bagrationi
- 1986 Sitting good! (grandfather)
- 1986 Inside allowed (neighbour Professor)

=== Cartoon voiceovers ===
1969 In a Country of Unlearned Lessons (Cat)

== Reviews and critical commentaries ==
=== Von Geldern review ===
"Honor of being the first film to break postwar taboos went to the far more modest The Soldier Ivan Brovkin (1955), directed by Ivan Lukinskii and ignored by film historians. Essentially a story about a nice young Russian boy drafted into the war, the film de-elevated the war film to a level accessible to common viewers, without challenging them to confront its pain. Played by Leonid Kharitonov, whose lyrical performance of several songs from the movie made him an all-Soviet heart throb, Brovkin opened the way for more adventurous films. Similar in story line but very different in treatment was the 1959 film Ballad of a Soldier, directed by Grigory Chukhray, which uses the tale of a young soldier on leave from the war to convey its futility and tragedy."James von Geldern

=== Critical commentary on Ivan Brovkin Na Tseline poster ===
The 1958 poster on the left illustrates the innocent face of the Brovkin character as performed by the sophisticated actor Kharitonov. It does this by contrasting the bland expression of the face with the shockingly modern (for 1958) complementary colours of the composition. The pictorial style predates the complementary colourist Andy Warhol's first exhibition of 1962, and demonstrates that it was part of the source-culture for that artist's work, which he called "artificial colour". The idea of re-working printed portraiture with gouache paints goes back to the previous century to such artists as Degas. The greyed-out sketch of the supporting actors in the top half of the poster serves to represent and encourage the audience's pleasure at seeing the Brovkin character on screen again. The poster contains another compositional joke or trick, as it appears to ignore the rule of thirds on the vertical axis, while actually fulfilling that visual requirement on the horizontal axis, although discreetly. This cleverness again parallels Kharitonov's clever but hidden acting skills.

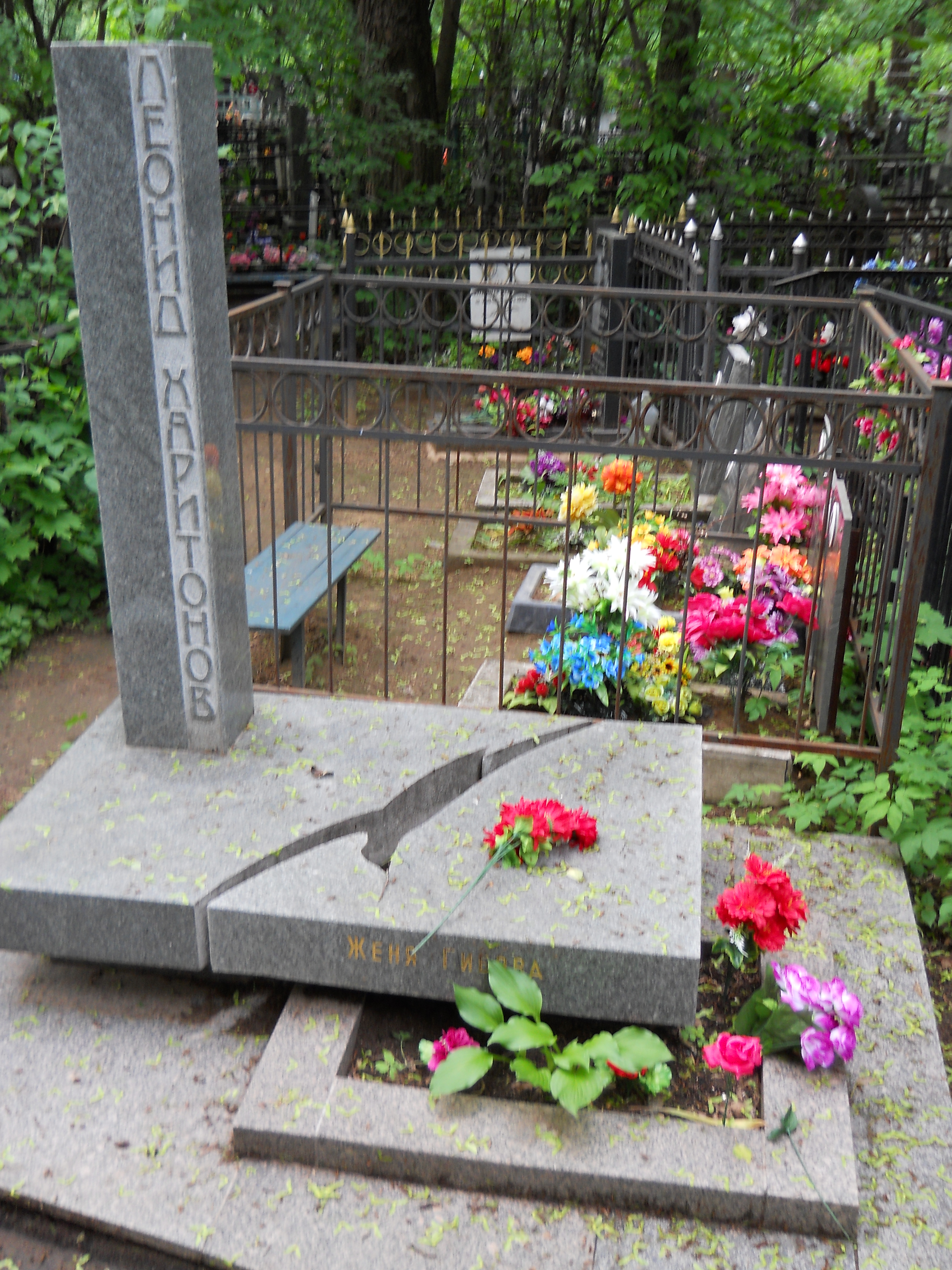
Leonid Kharitonov's grave

== See also ==
- Lists of Soviet films
- List of highest-grossing films in the Soviet Union
