= Happy Flight (1949 film) =

- Directed by: Vladimir Nemolyayev
- Written by: Viktor Ardov; Vladimir Nemolyayev
- Starring: Nikolay Kryuchkov; Mikhail Zharov; Vera Orlova; Vladimir Popov
- Cinematography: Samuil Rubashkin
- Music by: Sigizmund Kats
- Production company: Mosfilm
- Release date: 1949
- Running time: 79 minutes
- Country: Soviet Union
- Language: Russian

Happy Flight (Russian: Счастливый рейс, romanized: Schastlivyy reys) is a 1949 Soviet romantic comedy film directed by Vladimir Nemolyayev and starring Nikolay Kryuchkov, Mikhail Zharov and Vera Orlova. It was made by the Soviet Union's dominant studio Mosfilm. A young truck driver develops both a professional and romantic rivalry with a fellow driver.

== Plot ==
A young driver, Sinichkin, is given his first truck—a dilapidated GAZ-AA with the license plate MV 22-12, left in terrible condition by its previous driver, Zachesov. Zachesov, a boastful and reckless driver who frequently violates traffic rules, represents everything Sinichkin is determined to avoid. Through hard work and dedication, Sinichkin restores the old truck, proving his competence and passion for his job. His efforts not only lead to professional success but also bring him closer to Fenya, a gas station attendant. However, their budding relationship is challenged by Zachesov, who tries to impress Fenya with his luxurious new ZIS-101. Despite his flashy appearance, Zachesov's arrogance and laziness only highlight Sinichkin's genuine character.

Fenya ultimately chooses Sinichkin, drawn to his sincerity and dedication to his craft. As recognition of his efforts, Sinichkin is rewarded with a brand-new ZIS-110, symbolizing his growth and achievements. Together with Fenya, he proudly drives through the streets of Moscow, embodying the rewards of hard work and humility. Meanwhile, Zachesov, having destroyed his second car through negligence, is demoted and sent back to the battered "22-12" truck, a fitting consequence for his careless attitude.

== Cast ==
- Nikolay Kryuchkov as Driver Sinichkin
- Mikhail Zharov as Driver Zachyosov
- Vera Orlova as Fenya
- Olga Vikland as Dispatcher Telegina
- Vladimir Popov as Garage foreman
- Anatoly Gorunov as Alexey Trofimov
- Tatiana Peltzer as Grandmother Feni
- Svetlana Nemolyaeva as Girl
- Emmanuil Geller as Magician
- Evgeniy Leonov as Fireman
- Elena Ponsova
- Elena Tchaikovsky
- Ludmila Genik-Chirkova
- Alexey Alexeev
