= Street Full of Surprises =

- Russian: Улица полна неожиданностей
- Directed by: Sergei Sidelyov
- Written by: Leonid Karasyov
- Produced by: Polina Borisova
- Starring: Leonid Kharitonov; Vsevolod Larionov; Georgi Chernovolenko; Yakov Rodos; Jemma Osmolovskaya
- Cinematography: Sergei Ivanov
- Edited by: Raisa Izakson
- Music by: Nadezhda Simonyan
- Production company: Lenfilm
- Release date: 1957
- Running time: 73 min.
- Country: Soviet Union
- Language: Russian

Street Full of Surprises (Russian: Улица полна неожиданностей, romanized: Ulitsa polna neozhidannostey) is a 1957 Soviet police crime comedy film directed by Sergei Sidelyov.

== Plot ==
The film takes place in Leningrad. Chief Accountant, Smirnov, being in the booth of the traffic controller, violates traffic rules. But guard is brought to the police station instead of him Vodnev, the cashier of Stroytrest, the father of his beloved girl. The guard does admit that he was wrong, but he does not apologize. But, nevertheless, he will soon have a chance to fulfill his duty.

== Cast ==
- Leonid Kharitonov as Vasiliy Shaneshkin
- Vsevolod Larionov as Vladimir Zvantsev
- Georgi Chernovolenko as Ivan Zakharovich Vodnyev
- Yakov Rodos as Porfiriy Perovich Smirnov-Aliansky
- Jemma Osmolovskaya as Katya
- Vera Karpova as Liza
- Olga Porudolinskaya as Nadezhda Pavlovna
- Tamara Yevgenyeva-Ivanova as Mariya Mikhaylovna
- Yevgeny Leonov as Yevgeny Pavlovich Serdyukov
- Georgi Semyonov as Yegorov
- Sasha Soboleva as lost girl
- Lyudmila Makarova as lost girl's mother
