= Vera Orlova (actress) =

Russian actress

Vera Markovna Orlova (Russian: Ве́ра Ма́рковна Орло́ва; 25 May 1918, Yekaterinoslav – 16 September 1993, Moscow) was a Soviet and Russian stage and film actress. She was awarded a People's Artist of the RSFSR in 1960.

== Biography ==
She graduated from the Moscow theatrical school in 1942 and started to work at the Mayakovsky Theatre in Moscow. In 1974, she transferred to the Lenkom Theatre. At the same time, she also actively starred in cinema and provided a voice in cartoons.

For many years, she also led the Sunday radio broadcast S dobrym utrom! (Good morning!).

A serious foot disease in the mid-1980s made it difficult for her to work. She died in Moscow and was buried in the Donskoye Cemetery.

== Filmography ==
- The Call of Love (1945) as Liza Karasyova
- Happy Flight (1949) as Fenya
- Two Friends (1954) as Vitya Maleyev's mother
- Least We Forget (1954) as Glasha
- Private Ivan (1955) as Polina
- Different Fortunes (1956) as Nina Nikiforovna
- Ivan Brovkin on the State Farm (1958) as Polina
- The Key (1961) as Olga Zakharova, boy's mother (voice)
- Seven Nannies (1962) as Shamskaya, Maya's mother
- Children of Don Quixote (1965) as Vera Bondarenko
- I Loved You (1967) as Kolya's mother
- The Twelve Chairs (1976) as Yelena Stanislavovna Bour
- Do Not Part with Your Beloved (1979) as exchanger

== Awards and honors ==
- Honored Artist of the RSFSR (1954)
- People's Artist of the RSFSR (1960)
- Order of the Red Banner of Labour (1971)
- Order of Friendship of Peoples (1981)
