= Maksim Perepelitsa =

- Directed by: Anatoly Granik
- Written by: Ivan Stadnyuk
- Starring: Leonid Bykov; Lyudmila Kostyrko; Nikolai Yakovchenko; Aleksandr Borisov
- Cinematography: Dmitri Meskhiev
- Music by: Vasily Solovyov-Sedoi
- Production company: Lenfilm
- Release date: 1955
- Running time: 94 min.
- Country: Soviet Union
- Languages: Russian; Ukrainian

Maksim Perepelitsa (Russian: Максим Перепелица) is a 1955 comedy film directed by Anatoly Granik. The song "Let's Go" (known in Russian as "V Put") was written for this film.

== Plot ==
Maksim Perepelitsa is a cheerful and quick-witted guy from a Ukrainian village, well-known in his native town for his fantastic ability to invent all sorts of stories and take time off from work. When he receives a summons to the army, he wishes to "protect" himself against potential rivals and sends pumpkins to all the guys in the village on behalf of his beloved girl, Marusya – a traditional rejection of courtship in Ukraine. This causes a stir in the village, and the kolkhoz assembly even considers depriving Maksim of his honorable duty to serve in the Soviet Army. However, Maksim promises to correct his behavior.

In the army, Maksim tries to dodge responsibility and avoid the difficulties of service, but his tricks land him in trouble. He is arrested and confined to the guardhouse after being caught outside the camp while on unauthorized leave. Despite his missteps, Maksim’s flexible character and good-natured personality help him adapt and begin re-education. During a training exercise, Maksim shows intelligence and initiative, earning the rank of junior sergeant.

During his holiday break back in his village, Maksim demonstrates true heroism when he saves his grandfather, Musiy, from a pit. Troubled by the rumors about Marusya possibly not waiting for him, he gathers the courage to visit her. Marusya, rejecting other suitors, reciprocates his feelings, and the two are finally united in their love.

== Cast ==
- Leonid Bykov as Maksim Perepelitsa
- Lyudmila Kostirko as Maroussia, Maksim's bride
- Nikolai Yakovchenko as blacksmith Kondrat Perepelitsa, Maksim's father
- Aleksandr Borisov as postman Marco Mukha, Kondrat's friend
- George Asipenka as Opanas, Kondrat's friend
- Basil Fushchych as Stepan Levada, one of Maksim
- Taisiya Litvinenko as Vasilinka, Stepan's beloved
- Nina Tamarova as Yavdokha, seller of flowers
- Vladimir Efimov as Ivan Tverdokhlib, unfortunate groom of Maroussia
- Georgy Vitsin as Musiy, pensioner
- Alexander Stepanov as Fomin, a lieutenant, a platoon commander
- Konstantin Sorokin as Sablin, foreman, deputy commander of a platoon
- Alexander Susnin as Vasily Ezhikov, a colleague of Maksim
- Sergei Sibel as Samus, colleague Maksim
- Radner Muratov as Taskirov, a colleague of Maksim
- Paul Usovnichenko as Kupriyanov, a platoon commander (in credits as Kupriyanov, in the film as Vetrov)
- Boris Leskin as Mykola

== Production ==
Anatoly Granik for most of the major roles invited Ukrainian theater actors, as all of the rural scenes of the film took place in Ukraine, Poltava Oblast. The main characters, who came to serve in the army are Ukrainians.

In 1955, the film Private Ivan was made featuring a very similar story; author of the script and of the source material Ivan Stadnyuk openly accused the creators of "Private Ivan" in plagiarism.

After watching the movie "Maksim Perepelitsa" the army accused screenwriter Stadnyuk of promoting familiarity in the army. This alleged familiarity was reflected in the scene where the company commander, senior lieutenant Kupriyanov invites Maksim, after he returns from the guardhouse, to sit beside him on the bench and at the same time gives him a cigarette from his own cigarette case.

This film is the first on-screen appearance of the AK-47.

== See also ==
- Private Ivan
