= One-Two, Soldiers Were Going... =

- Directed by: Leonid Bykov
- Written by: Boris Vasilyev; Kirill Rapoport
- Starring: Leonid Bykov; Vladimir Konkin
- Cinematography: Volodymyr Voytenko
- Music by: Georgy Dmitriyev
- Production company: Dovzhenko Film Studios
- Release dates: April 15, 1977 (Soviet Union); December 11, 1977 (Poland); October 19, 1978 (Hungary)
- Running time: 87 minutes
- Country: Soviet Union
- Language: Russian

One-Two, Soldiers Were Going... (Russian: «Аты-баты, шли солдаты...», romanized: Aty-baty, shli soldaty...) (Note: "Аты-баты, шли солдаты" is the first line of children's counting rhyme Аты-баты, шли солдаты, / Аты-баты, на базар. / Аты-баты, что купили? / Аты-баты, самовар. In the film, the soldiers sing the marching song Аты-баты, шли солдаты, / аты-баты, на войну by Bulat Okudzhava) is a 1977 Soviet war film directed by Leonid Bykov.

The small station Podbednya is no different from many other stations of the Soviet Union: it was the site of fierce battles with the Nazi invaders during the Great Patriotic War. And now it is the meeting place of the relatives of those who brought victory closer but did not live to see it.

"One-Two, Soldiers Were Going..." tells two stories in parallel. One takes place in 1974, the other in 1944. By the end of the movie the two stories converge on the site of the battle that took place on March 18, 1944, the memory of which is honored by the soldiers' families and friends on March 18, 1974.

== Plot ==
In the present-day storyline, Colonel Konstantin Svyatkin celebrates his recent promotion with colleagues when he receives a postcard inviting him to Podbednya station, where his father perished three decades earlier. Raised in an orphanage after his mother's early death, Konstantin barely remembers his father. On the train to Podbednya, he meets Anna Velenstovich, whose father, Junior Lieutenant Igor Suslin, died in the same battle. Anna, who arranged the gathering, and the local village leader hope to unite relatives of the fallen soldiers. The event brings together those connected by shared loss, including a witness to the battle, Valentina Ivanovna, who recalls the night Suslin's platoon stayed in her family's home before heading to their final battle.

The 1944 storyline centers on Junior Lieutenant Suslin, recently assigned to command an anti-tank platoon. Among his soldiers is Corporal Svyatkin, a lighthearted but battle-hardened soldier known as "Matchmaker," who has already taken out three German tanks. Upon arrival at Podbednya, Suslin's platoon receives orders to spend the night at Ilyinka and proceed to Rumyantsevo. That night, Svyatkin celebrates the birthday of his newborn son with comrades, though he humorously claims he has “no birthday” of his own. Suslin, too, reconnects with an old classmate and spends the evening with her. By morning, he learns from a wounded colonel that a German motorized unit has broken through the lines and is advancing toward Ilyinka. Suslin's platoon, including the experienced yet playful Svyatkin, is tasked with a critical mission: to hold the line and prevent the enemy from reaching the many wounded soldiers in the area, setting the stage for the sacrifice that would become the focus of commemoration decades later.

== Cast ==
- Leonid Bykov as Viktor Svyatkin
- Vladimir Konkin as Igor Suslin
- Yelena Shanina as Kima Velenstovich
- Bohdan Beniuk as Krynkin
- Ivan Havryliuk as Sgt Ivan Saiko, ″Baltika″
- Otabek Ganiyev as Khabarbekov
- Vladimir Gerasimov as Vladimir Myatnikov, "Philosopher"
- Nikolai Sektimenko as Glebov
- Vano Yantbelidze as Vano Koderidze
- Leonid Bakshtayev as Konstantin
- Yevgeniya Uralova as Anna, Suslin and Kima's daughter
- Nikolai Grinko as colonel, Konstantin's commander
- Mikhail Yezepov as singer Michael, Myatnikov's son
- Natalya Naum as Valentina Ivanovna
- Boris Khimichev as Yuri Ivanovich, Saiko's son
- Yuriy Sherstnyov as Glebov's nephew
- Aida Yunusova as Yunes, Khabarbekov's daughter
- Yevhen Paperny as Konstantin's colleague (uncredited)
