= Anatoly Sofronov =

Russian writer and poet (1911–1990)

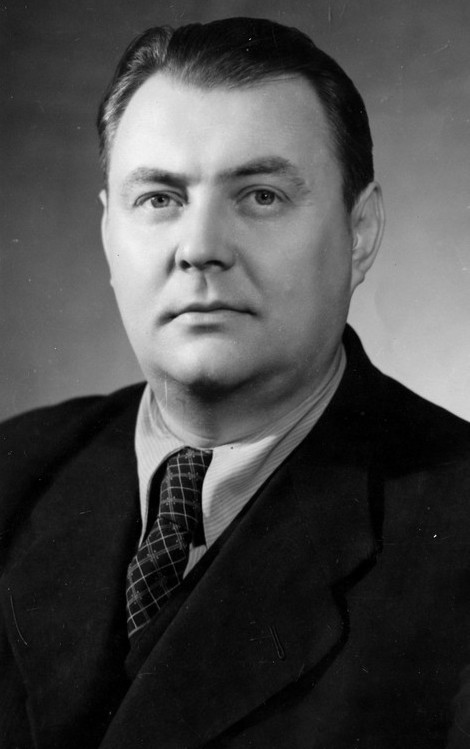
- Born: Anatoly Vladimirovich Sofronov; January 19, 1911; Minsk, Russian Empire
- Died: September 9, 1990 (aged 79); Moscow, Russian SFSR, USSR
- Occupations: Poet, journalist, screenwriter, editor, translator
- Years active: 1930–1990
- Awards: Hero of Socialist Labour (1981); 3 Orders of Lenin (1961, 1967, 1981); 2 Stalin Prizes (1948, 1949)

Anatoly Vladimirovich Sofronov (Russian: Анато́лий Влади́мирович Софро́нов; 19 January 1911 – 9 September 1990) was a Soviet Russian writer, poet, playwright, screenwriter, editor (Ogoniok, 1953–1986) and literary administrator, the Union of Soviet Writers' secretary in 1948–1953. Sofronov was a Stalin Prize laureate (twice, 1948, 1949) and a Hero of Socialist Labour (1981).

An ominous figure with the reputation of "one of the most feared literary hangmen of the Stalinist era," Sofronov is best remembered for his play Stryapukha (Стряпуха, The Kookie) which was followed by three sequels and the popular comedy film of the same name.

Working with composers like Semyon Zaslavsky, Matvey Blanter, Sigizmund Kats, he co-authored dozens of songs, made popular by the artists like Vladimir Bunchikov, Vladimir Nechaev, Vadim Kozin, Nikolai Ruban, Vladimir Troshin, Olga Voronets, Maya Kristalinskaya, Joseph Kobzon and Nani Bregvadze.
