= Mikhail Pugovkin =

Soviet and Russian actor

- Михаил Пуговкин
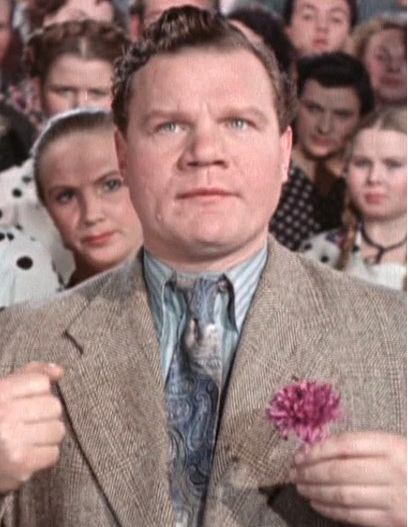
- Pugovkin in 1955
- Born: 13 July 1923; Kostroma Governorate, Russian SFSR, Soviet Union
- Died: 25 July 2008 (aged 85); Moscow, Russia
- Resting place: Vagankovo Cemetery, Moscow
- Occupation: Actor
- Years active: 1939-2004
- Title: People's Artist of the USSR (1988)

Mikhail Ivanovich Pugovkin (Russian: Михаи́л Ива́нович Пу́говкин; 13 July 1923 — 25 July 2008) was a Soviet and Russian theatre and film comic actor named a People's Artist of the USSR in 1988.

He studied in the Moscow Art Theatre school under Ivan Moskvin, took part in World War II and, following demobilisation, was featured in the 1944 all-star cast adaptation of Anton Chekhov's The Wedding. Another step to stardom was the 1967 comedy Wedding in Malinovka.

Pugovkin went on to appear in more than 100 films. His roles in Leonid Gaidai's comedies, such as Operation Y and Other Shurik's Adventures (1965), Twelve Chairs (1971), Ivan Vasilievich: Back to the Future (1973) and Borrowing Matchsticks (1980) made him one of the most popular comedians of the former Soviet Union.

Pugovkin lived in Yalta, Crimea before moving to Moscow in 1999. A statue of Father Fyodor from The Twelve Chairs portrayed by Pugovkin was unveiled in Kharkiv, Ukraine in 2001.

Pugovkin died on July 25, 2008, in his house in Moscow. He was buried on July 29 at Vagankovo Cemetery.

== Filmography ==
Film
| Year | Title | Role | Notes |
|---|---|---|---|
| 1940 | Yakov Sverdlov | worker | |
| 1941 | The Artamonov Business | Stepasha Barsky | |
| 1942 | Concert to the Front | Soldier | uncredited |
| 1944 | Kutuzov | Fedya | |
| 1944 | The Wedding | wedding guest | |
| 1944 | Six P.M. | Artilleryman | |
| 1946 | A Noisy Household | Soldier Pugovkin | |
| 1947 | The First Glove | The Driver | |
| 1953 | Maksimka | Russian sailor | |
| 1953 | Attack from the Sea | Piroshkov | |
| 1953 | Admiral Ushakov | Pirozhkov | |
| 1953 | Attack from the Sea | Pirozhkov | |
| 1954 | True Friends | club entertainer | |
| 1954 | School of Courage | Shmakov | |
| 1954 | Did We Meet Somewhere Before | guard policeman | |
| 1955 | Good Morning | seller | |
| 1955 | The Crash of the Emirate | Yasny | |
| 1955 | Private Ivan | Zakhar Silich | |
| 1956 | Earth and People | Grishka Khvat | |
| 1956 | Once, On A Wonderful Day | Panas Chushko | |
| 1956 | Ilya Muromets | Razumey | |
| 1957 | Truth | Vasily Bozhenko | |
| 1958 | The Variegateds Case | Safron Lozhkin, thief | |
| 1958 | Oleko Dundich | soldier | |
| 1958 | A Girl with Guitar | Penkin | |
| 1958 | Brothers | Vanya Komarov | Korean: 잊지말라 파주블! |
| 1959 | Ivan Brovkin on the State Farm | Zakhar Silich Peryoshkin | |
| 1959 | May Stars | Starsina | |
| 1959 | A Special Approach | Department Head | |
| 1960 | A Snow Fairy Tale | Chauffeur | |
| 1960 | They Were Nineteen | Baba | |
| 1961 | Fortress on Wheels | Vozhzhov | |
| 1961 | Heart Doesn't Forgive | Konykov | |
| 1961 | The Girls | Commandant | |
| 1962 | Happy Birthday! | policeman | |
| 1962 | Freak Man | Maksim Danilovich Mezha | |
| 1962 | Knight's Move | Khariton Erofeevich Pomerantsev | |
| 1963 | Cheryomushki | Kovalyov | |
| 1963 | Free Kick | Pavel Kukushkin | |
| 1964 | Big Wick | train passenger' | |
| 1964 | The First Day of Freedom | Grigory, Colonel Davydov's adjutant | Polish: Pierwszy dzien wolnosci |
| 1964 | Summer Is Over | Chief forwarder | |
| 1964 | A Bag Full of Hearts | Kirill | |
| 1965 | Operation Y and Other Shurik's Adventures | Pavel Stepanovich, Construction Works Manager | (Segment "Workmate") |
| 1965 | Give Me a Book of Complaints | neighbour | |
| 1965 | Above us is the Southern Cross | policeman | |
| 1965 | Unconquered Battalion | colonel Kolpakov | |
| 1965 | Sleeping Lion | police sergeant | |
| 1966 | Traveler with Luggage | Taxi driver | |
| 1967 | Wedding in Malinovka | Yashka the Gunner | |
| 1967 | His Name Was Robert | Knopkin | |
| 1968 | Suitable for Non-combatant | Kachura | |
| 1968 | Fire, Water, and Brass Pipes | Tsar | |
| 1969 | If There Are Sails | Dudka, boatswain | |
| 1970 | Barbara the Fair with the Silken Hair | Tsar Yeremei | |
| 1971 | The Twelve Chairs | Father Fyodor | |
| 1971 | Shelmenko-batman | Shelmenko | |
| 1973 | The Golden Horns | Robber Chief Irod | |
| 1973 | Ivan Vasilievich: Back to the Future | film director Yakin | |
| 1973 | Neylon 100% | Misha | |
| 1974 | Screen Star | Boris Dudkin | |
| 1975 | It Can't Be! | Gorbushkin | |
| 1975 | Finist, the brave Falcon | Voyevoda | |
| 1975 | After the Fair | Prantsys Pustorevich | |
| 1976 | Unknown Heir | Aleksey Kuznetsov | |
| 1976 | The Little Mermaid | drunk satellite / thick-lipped | |
| 1977 | I Have an Idea! | Vladimir Nikolaevich, state farm director | |
| 1978 | The New Adventures of Captain Wrongel | Captain Wrongel | |
| 1980 | Borrowing Matchsticks | chief of Police | |
| 1980 | Forest | Vosymibratov | |
| 1981 | The Suicide Club, or the Adventures of a Titled Person | Rabum's gardener | |
| 1981 | Sailors Have No Questions | Uncle Misha | |
| 1981 | The Sixth | Mironych | |
| 1982 | Sportloto-82 | San Sanych Murashko | |
| 1982 | Silver Revue | ice keeper | |
| 1983 | Married Bachelor | Vasiliy Petrovich Bulavin | |
| 1983 | Without Much Risk | Sergey Sergeevich | |
| 1984 | Ordered to Take Alive | Border Guard Outpost's Starshina | |
| 1984 | Egorka | boatswain Toporshchuk | |
| 1985 | Man with an Accordion | uncle Kolya | |
| 1986 | Malicious Sunday | Miron Sergeevich | |
| 1987 | Sitting on the Golden Porch | Tsar Fedot | |
| 1987 | Visit to Minotaur | Stepan Melnik | TV Mini-Series |
| 1991 | Bolotnaya Street, or a Remedy for Sex | Fyodor Ivanovich | |
| 1992 | Shot in the Coffin | colonel / Butylkin | |
| 1992 | Gentlemen Artists | provincial official | |
| 2001 | Town Musicians of Bremen | King | |

== Honours and awards ==
- Order of Merit for the Fatherland 4th class
- Order of Honour
- Order of the Patriotic War 2nd class
- Order of the Badge of Honour
- Medal of Zhukov
- Jubilee Medal "50 Years of Victory in the Great Patriotic War 1941-1945"
- Medal "For the Victory over Germany in the Great Patriotic War 1941–1945"
- Medal "Veteran of Labour"
- Jubilee Medal "300 Years of the Russian Navy"
- Medal "In Commemoration of the 850th Anniversary of Moscow"
- Ukrainian Order of Merit 3rd class
