= Ivanovo State University =

Educational institution in Russia

- Ивановский государственный университет
- Motto: Pro patriae beneficio (Latin)
- Type: Public university
- Established: 1918
- Rector: Aleksey Malygin
- Location: (Russia) Ivanovo, Russia; 57.0190°N 40.9570°E Building details
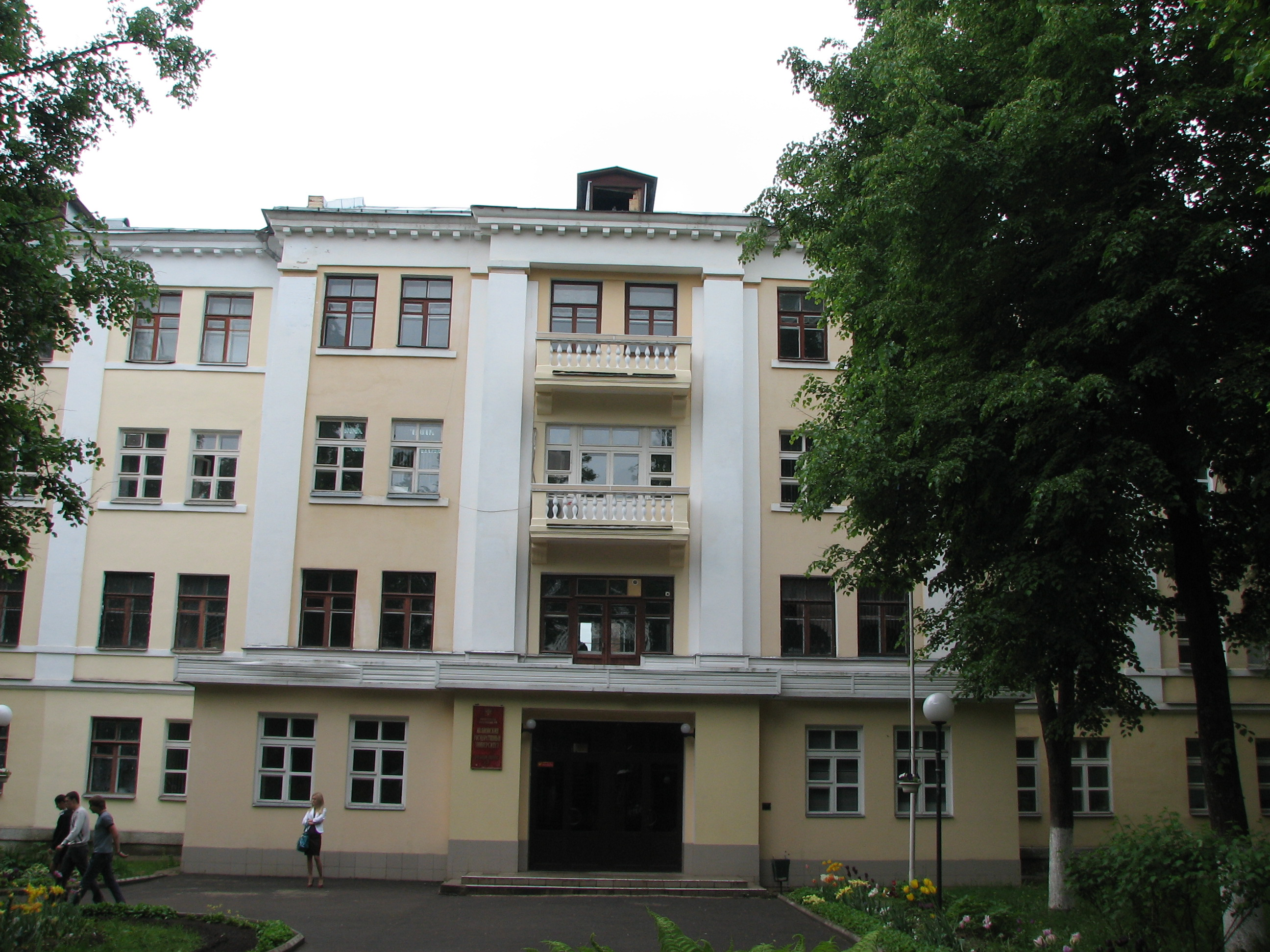
- Website: http://ivanovo.ac.ru/about_the_university/english/greeting.php

Ivanovo State University (Russian: Ива́новский госуда́рственный университе́т) or IvSU (Russian: ИвГУ) is in Ivanovo, about 300 km east of Moscow, Russia. The university was founded in 1918; before 1974, it was called Ivanovo State Pedagogical Institute.

IvSU has accreditation and a license from the Russian Ministry of Education. IvSU has different types of programs from a traditional five-year specialist degree to a four-year bachelor's degree and a two-year master's degree following the modernization of the Russian education system and the Bologna Process.

== History ==
Ivanovo State University was founded on 21 December 1918 as Ivanovo-Voznesensk Institute of National Education. On 12 July 1923, it was transformed into a teacher training college which in turn served as a basis for creating a teacher training institute in August 1932. That institute was named after Dmitry Furmanov. Ivanovo State University received its new name in 1974.

== Campus ==
IvSU has 9 academic buildings and three residence halls. The university has a library, sports facility, health centre, zoological and archaeological museums, the "Writers of Ivanovo Region" museum, a botanical garden, and a vivarium.

== Educational programmes ==
IvSU offers 23 Bachelor's degree programs, 17 Master's degree programs, ten PhD programs, and a specialist's degree in fundamental and applied chemistry.

== International cooperation ==
IvSU has established partnerships with educational and scientific institutions in Bulgaria, Belarus, Vietnam, Germany, Italy, Kazakhstan, China, Poland, Romania, Serbia, Tajikistan, Finland, Czech Republic, Sweden, Uzbekistan, Denmark, China, and Uzbekistan.

The acting agreements give IvSU students and faculty an opportunity to improve their professional knowledge and language skills, be more familiar with the cultures of various countries, and gain experience in cross-cultural communication through exchange education, participation in languages, scientific internships, educational tours, and other forms of exchange education.

== International activity ==
Ivanovo State University offers foreign students a wide range of opportunities for developing their creative abilities and enriching their cultural knowledge. At the "A World without Borders" annual interuniversity scientific and practical conference, issues related to intercultural dialogue and interethnic tolerance are discussed. There is an active participation of foreign students in this conference.

== Career centre and future skills preparation ==
A main objective of the center is to help undergraduate and graduate students at IvSU adapt to the present-day labor market and provide them with career guidance.

== Student life ==
IvSU students take an active part in a number of all-Russian forums and workshops such as "Students' Russia", contests "Student of the Year" and "Univervidenie", the all-Russian "Student Forum", "Territory of Meanings", "XXI century leader" workshops, etc.

== Scientific research ==
Ivanovo State University carries out fundamental and applied research in 19 scientific fields in the natural and engineering sciences, the humanities, and the social sciences.

IvSU publishes a number of journals, including 'Liquid Crystals and Their Application', 'Woman in Russian Society', and 'Intelligentsia and the World'.

'Liquid Crystals and Their Application' is included in international citation databases, such as Web of Science and Scopus.

== Sports ==
About 3,000 students are engaged in physical education in the university. Sports clubs are available for students interested in aerobics, badminton, basketball, football, gymnastics, kayaking, kickboxing, powerlifting, sambo, skiing, table tennis, volleyball, and wushu.

== Notable personalities ==
=== Staff ===
- Aleksandr Khinchin
- Nikolai Luzin
- Anatoly Maltsev

=== Alumni ===
- Mikhail Dudin
- Igor Zhukov
