= School of Courage =

- Russian: Школа мужества
- Directed by: Vladimir Basov; Mstislav Korchagin
- Written by: Konstantin Semyonov; Solomon Rozen
- Starring: Leonid Kharitonov; Mark Bernes; Vladimir Yemelyanov; Nikolai Garin; Vadim Zakharchenko
- Cinematography: Timofey Lebeshev
- Edited by: Antonina Medvedeva
- Music by: Mikhail Ziv
- Production company: Mosfilm
- Release date: 1954
- Running time: 99 minutes
- Country: Soviet Union
- Language: Russian

School of Courage (Russian: Школа мужества, romanized: Shkola Muzhestva) is a 1954 Soviet war/adventure film directed by Vladimir Basov and Mstislav Korchagin. It is based on the 1929 novel School by Arkady Gaidar. Meant for juvenile audience, it became a 1954 Soviet box office leaders (10th place with 27.2 million viewers). The movie was a directorial debut for Vladimir Basov and Mstislav Korchagin (who died in a plane crash right after the end of shooting) and an acting debut for Rolan Bykov and Leonid Kharitonov.

== Plot ==
The film tells about a Russian high school student, Boris Golikov, during the First World War. He has been influenced by the official Czarist patriotism of the period, and is consequently horrified when he learns that his father has deserted from the front. But the arrest and execution of his father, and then the influence of his father's comrade, who has joined the Bolshevik force, leads him to join the Red Army on the Don front. He enters the detachment of the former teacher Semion Galka. With the detachment, he goes through the rear lines of the White forces to join up with the main Red Army.

== Cast ==
- Leonid Kharitonov as Boris
- Mark Bernes as Afansii Chubuk
- Vladimir Yemelyanov as Guerilla Leader
- Nikolai Garin as Colonel Zhikharev
- Georgi Gumilevsky as Akim Ryabukha
- Vadim Zakharchenko as Syrtsov
- Mikhail Pugovkin as Shmakov
- Nikolay Grabbe as Jan, aka Ivan, guerilla
- Vladimir Gorelov as Gypsy
- Roza Makagonova as Verka, peasant girl
- Evgeniya Melnikova as Mother Gorikova
- Pyotr Chernov as Father Gorikov
- Grigory Mikhaylov as Verka's Father
- Rolan Bykov as student of a real school

== Awards ==
- 1954 — Best educational film at the 8th Karlovy Vary International Film Festival
