= Novomykolaivka, Cherkaske settlement hromada, Kramatorsk Raion, Donetsk Oblast =

Village in Kramatorsk Raion, Ukraine

Novomykolaivka Новомиколаївка
- Village
- Interactive map of Novomykolaivka
- Location of Novomykhailivka within Ukraine Novomykolaivka (Donetsk Oblast)
- Coordinates: 48.886944°N 37.374167°E
- Country: Ukraine
- Oblast: Donetsk Oblast
- Raion: Kramatorsk Raion
- Hromada: Cherkaske settlement hromada
- Elevation: 139 m (456 ft)

Population (2001 census)
  - Total: 857
- Time zone: UTC+2 (EET)
  - Summer (DST): UTC+3 (EEST)
- Postal code: 84167
- Area code: +380 626
- KATOTTH: UA14120230050045961

Novomykolaivka (Ukrainian: Новомиколаївка; Russian: Новониколаевка) is a village in the Kramatorsk Raion of Donetsk Oblast in eastern Ukraine, at about 101.01 kilometres (62.76 mi) northwest by north (NWbN) of the centre of Donetsk city. It belongs to Cherkaske settlement hromada, one of the hromadas of Ukraine.

== History ==
On 20 August 2015, Novomykolaivka formed a local government association together with other nearby villages called the Cherkaske united territorial community.

== Demographics ==
As of the 2001 Ukrainian census, the settlement had 857 inhabitants, whose native languages were 90.22% Ukrainian and 9.78% Russian.
