= His Name Was Robert =

- Directed by: Ilya Olshvanger
- Written by: Anna Rodionova
- Produced by: A. Tarasov
- Starring: Oleg Strizhenov; Marianna Vertinskaya; Mikhail Pugovkin
- Cinematography: Edgar Shtyrtskober
- Edited by: Elena Mironova
- Music by: Andrey Petrov
- Production company: Lenfilm
- Release date: October 18, 1967
- Running time: 85 minutes
- Country: Soviet Union
- Language: Russian

His Name Was Robert (Russian: Его звали Роберт, romanized: Ego zvali Robert) is a 1967 Soviet science fiction film directed by Ilya Olshvanger.

== Plot ==
The scientist Sergey Sergeevich (Oleg Strizhenov) creates an experimental humanoid robot (also played by Oleg Strizhenov), designed, according to his plan, to master the far space inaccessible to humans, and gives him the name Robert. Robert looks like his creator, like a twin. Sergey Sergeevich decides to test the robot in the human environment and sends it on a date with the bride of one of his employees Tatiana (Marianna Vertinskaya). However, Robert "falls in love" with her and readily fulfills all, even the most ridiculous and dangerous tasks of the girl, because he understands all her orders literally. The robot goes out of control - it even disappears from the field of view of scientists, going after Tanya in a mountain camp. There, at the resort, he settles in a room with a certain citizen Knopkin (Mikhail Pugovkin).

Dangerous social and technical consequences are imminent. Scientists rush to search and find it, but their questioning leads to everyone starting to take Knopkin for that same robot, which leads to many mishaps.

Tanya, meanwhile, gives Robert too many human tasks which he can not fulfill. Its circuits fail from overvoltage and it breaks. The inventors of the robot find it and take it for regeneration. Scientists understand that using a robot in an unknown and unpredictable environment is unsuitable, and a man is preparing for the space flight.

== Cast ==
- Oleg Strizhenov — Sergey Kuklin / Robert
- Marianna Vertinskaya — Tanya
- Mikhail Pugovkin — Knopkin
- Vladimir Pobol — Gennady
- Nina Mamaeva — Katyusha
- Panteleimon Krymov — machinist
- Yuri Tolubeyev — inspector
- Marcel Marceau — cameo
- Alexander Yarovoi — volunteer
- Igor Yefimov — Kuklin's neighbor
- Alisa Freindlich — singer

== Production ==
Most of the filming took place in Leningrad in the pavilions of Lenfilm and on the city streets. "Mountain" episodes of the film were shot in the Caucasus, at the base of Mount Elbrus. It was loosely remade, twenty years later, as Making Mr. Right starring John Malkovich.
