= Little Hare =

1964 Soviet film

- Russian DVD cover
- Russian: Зайчик
- Directed by: Leonid Bykov
- Written by: Mikhail Gindin; Genrikh Ryabkin; Kim Ryzhov
- Produced by: Joseph Shurukht
- Starring: Leonid Bykov; Olga Krasina; Igor Gorbachyov; Sergey Filippov; Georgy Vitsin
- Cinematography: Sergei Ivanov
- Edited by: K. Lapik
- Music by: Andrey Petrov
- Production company: Lenfilm
- Release date: 1964
- Running time: 87 min.
- Country: Soviet Union
- Language: Russian

Little Hare (Russian: Зайчик, romanized: Zaychik) is a 1964 Soviet comedy film directed by Leonid Bykov.

== Plot ==
The film tells about an honest, shy and kind man who works as a make-up artist in the theater, who suddenly gets to know he has a month left to live. He decides to spend the last month of his life with dignity and like a good man. The hero starts doing things he was afraid to do his entire life: putting rude people back into their place, protecting people from injustice and self-righteous or abusive people, defending all he can with no second thoughts or regrets. He has no fear now, he is not afraid to be left alone or be laughed at. In the end, as it turns out, the deadly prognosis (which he actually came to know because he was eavesdropping), was about an actual hare (a play of words: His surname is Zaychik. Zaychik is also a word for "little hare", hence the name of movie). But by that time he has become a different man: decisive, courageous and knowing his worth.

== Themes ==
... This surname — Zaychik — seems funny because in the person wearing it, at first there really is something hare-like. A modest theatrical make—up artist, he is shy and delicate, only his delicacy turns to timidity every now and then, and often at crucial moments of life he is unable to firmly say "yes" or "no". But it is not in vain that a hot and kind heart beats in the Zaychik's chest. And when he realizes that he can become necessary for people, life acquires a high meaning and significance for him. We defined the genre of the film for ourselves as an eccentric comedy with a fair satirical charge. Our main principle is that the hero is confronted with really recognizable people, with really recognizable institutions and, most importantly, with real phenomena.

— Leonid Bykov

== Cast ==
- Leonid Bykov as Lev Zaychik
- Olga Krasina as Natasha
- Igor Gorbachyov as Shabashnikov
- Sergey Filippov as Theater Director
- Georgy Vitsin as Assistant Director
- Aleksei Smirnov as Sound Effects Man
- Igor Dmitriev as Count Nulin
- Lev Stepanov as Patronchikov
- Glikeriya Bogdanova-Chesnokova as Glikeriya Vasilievna

== Music ==
The song "Waves go out on the sand without a trace" (Russian: Гаснут на песке волны без следа, romanized: Gasnut na peske volny bez sleda), performed by Leonid Bykov himself, was written by screenwriter Kim Ryzhov (lyrics) and composer Andrey Petrov. It was recorded by Leningrad Radio and Television Orchestra conducted by Alexander Vladimirtsov.

== Release ==
One of the leaders of the Soviet box office in 1965: 16th place among domestic films (23rd place in the general list) with 25.1 million viewers.
