= What a Moonlit Night =

Ukrainian range song

"Ніч яка місячна Nič jaka miśačna"
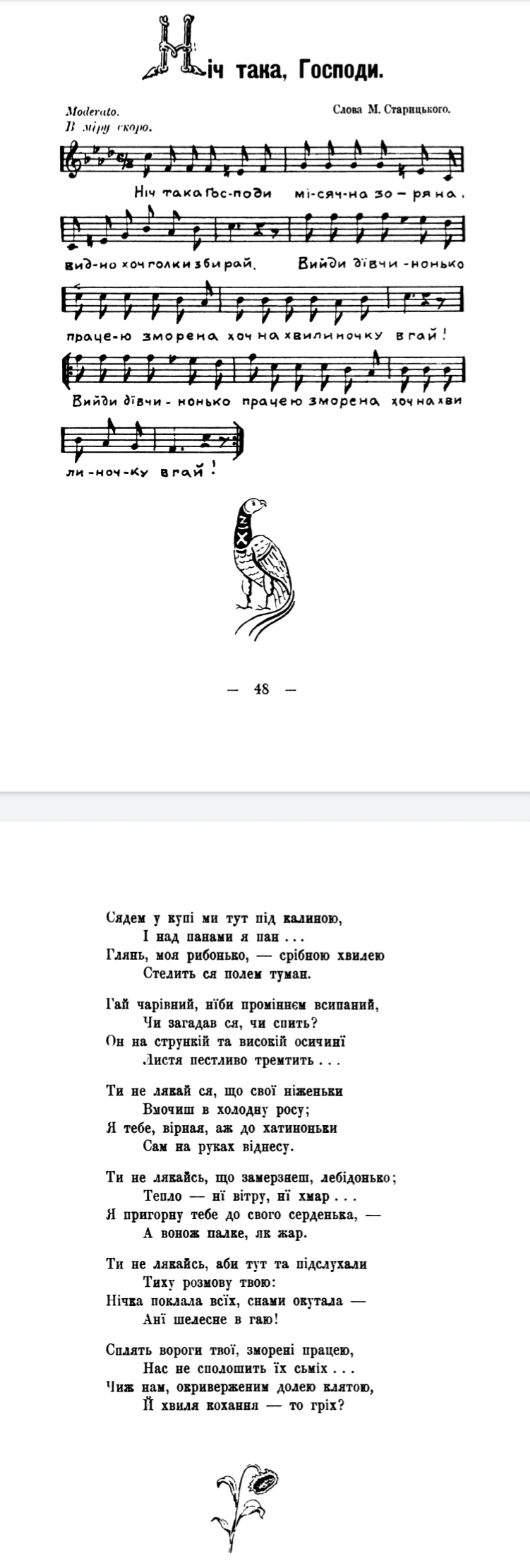
- Score, opening words 'What a Night, my God'

Song by see §
- Language: Ukrainian
- English title: "What a Moonlit Night"
- Genre: Folk; romance
- Songwriter: Mychajlo Staryćkyj
- Composers: Andryj Vološčeńko; Vasyl Ovčynnikov

A modern performance of the song

"What A Moonlit Night" (Ukrainian: «Ніч яка місячна», romanized: Nič jaka miśačna) is a Ukrainian song composed by kobzar Andriy Voloshchenko and Vasyl Ovchynnikov with lyrics from a poem by Mykhailo Starytsky.

Mykola Lysenko wrote the music for it, as an aria included in the opera, based on Mykola Gogol's story "The Drowned". It was first published in 1885 in the Odesa almanac "Niva". However, the song became world-famous with a different melody, which was composed by the Andriy Voloshchenko and Vasyl Ovchinnikov.

== Performers ==
One of Ukraine's most popular folk songs, it has been performed by Oleksandr Ponomariov, Konstantin Ognevyi, Anatoliy Solovianenko, Dmytro Hnatyuk, Mykola Kondratiuk, Cara Schlecker, Mykola Platonov, Evgeny Belyaev, Boris Gmyrya, Kvitka Cisyk, Yaroslav Alexandrovich Evdokimov, Christian Ketter, Alexander Malinin and others.

The version in English by Voll Deineko could be found on Youtube: "The Night Is So Moonful, Starry, And Luminous"

== Ukrainian text by Mykhailo Starytsky ==
ВИКЛИК (CALLING)

1870

Ніч яка, Господи! Місячна, зоряна:
Ясно, хоч голки збирай…
Вийди, коханая, працею зморена,
Хоч на хвилиночку в гай!

Сядем укупі ми тут під калиною —
І над панами я пан…
Глянь, моя рибонько, — срібною хвилею
Стелеться полем туман;

Гай чарівний, ніби променем всипаний,
Чи загадався, чи спить?
Он на стрункій та високій осичині
Листя пестливо тремтить;

Небо незміряне всипано зорями —
Що то за Божа краса!
Перлами-зорями теж під тополями
Грає перлиста роса.

Ти не лякайся-но, що свої ніженьки
Вмочиш в холодну росу:
Я тебе, вірная, аж до хатиноньки
Сам на руках однесу.

Ти не лякайсь, а що змерзнеш, лебедонько:
Тепло — ні вітру, ні хмар…
Я пригорну тебе до свого серденька,
Й займеться зразу, мов жар;

Ти не лякайсь, аби тут та підслухали
Тиху розмову твою:
Нічка поклала всіх, соном окутала —
Ані шелесне в гаю!

Сплять вороги твої, знуджені працею,
Нас не сполоха їх сміх…
Чи ж нам, окривдженим долею клятою,
Й хвиля кохання — за гріх?

In the film Only "Old Men" Are Going Into Battle:

Ніч яка місячна, зоряна, ясная,
Видно, хоч голки збирай.
Вийди коханая, працею зморена
Хоч на хвилиночку в гай.

Ти ж не лякайся, що ніженьки босії
Топчуть холодну росу.
Я ж тебе вірная аж до хатиноньки
Сам на руках однесу.

Сядемо вкупочці біля хатиноньки
І над панами я пан.
Глянь, моя рибонько, срібнею хвилею
Котиться в полі туман.
