= Ivan Brovkin on the State Farm =

- Directed by: Ivan Lukinsky
- Written by: Georgi Mdivany
- Starring: Leonid Kharitonov; Sergei Blinnikov; Tatyana Pelttser; Anna Kolomiytseva; Vera Orlova
- Cinematography: Valery Ginsburg; Lev Ragozin
- Edited by: Olga Katusheva
- Music by: Anatoli Lepin
- Production company: Gorky Film Studio
- Release date: 1959
- Running time: 97 minutes
- Country: Soviet Union
- Language: Russian

Ivan Brovkin on the State Farm (Russian: Иван Бровкин на целине, romanized: Ivan Brovkin na tseline) is a 1959 Soviet romantic comedy film directed by Ivan Lukinsky, sequel to the film Private Ivan. The film was a box-office success, it was seen by 44,6 million viewers in the USSR.

== Plot ==
Ivan Brovkin completes military service with the rank of sergeant, and with a group of friends decides to go after demobilization to the developed virgin lands. He arrives to his native kolkhoz and is greeted by a cool reception: the collective farm chairman, bride Lyubasha and her mother regard him as traitor. The planned wedding is canceled and Brovkin leaves for the virgin land.

Brovkin comes to the virgin soil at the time of the plowing of the land. He joins the team. During everyday work winter passes. In letters home he writes that all is well. News of how Ivan lives spreads through the village. Lyubasha seriously thinks about how to escape from her home to the virgin lands.

In spring Brovkin is already appointed as foreman of the tractor brigade.

Harvest time is approaching. Brovkin considers to go back to his native farm because he misses his Lyubasha. Director of the farm knows this, and wishing to keep a valuable employee insistently recommends him to build a house. And then finally Brovkin's mother arrives to check up on him. Learning this the director instructs the driver to simulate breakdown of the engine on Brovkin's way from the airport to the farm, and he organizes a double-time construction of a house for the state farm foreman during a subbotnik.

Zahar Silich comes to the sovkhoz to pick up his bride Polina (who has also left for the virgin lands) home. But seeing the situation at the state farm he decides to stay on the virgin lands. Soon Zahar Silich has a wedding with his beloved.

Leader of production Ivan Brovkin is awarded with the Order of the Red Banner of Labour.

After the harvest, Zahar Silich with his wife and Ivan Brovkin come to visit their native village for a short time. Ivan marries his Lyubasha and together they go to the virgin lands.

== Production ==
The picture was shot on virgin lands of the Orenburg Oblast in the sovkhoz "Komsomolskiy".

== Cast ==
- Leonid Kharitonov
- Sergei Blinnikov
- Tatyana Pelttser
- Anna Kolomiytseva
- Mikhail Pugovkin
- Vera Orlova as Polina Grebeshkova
- Konstantin Sinitsyn as Sergey Barabanov
- Tanat Zhailibekov as Mukhtar Abayev
- Sofya Zaykova as Dr. Irina Nikolayevna
