= Cherkaske, Donetsk Oblast =

Urban locality in Donetsk Oblast, Ukraine

Cherkaske Черкаське
- Rural settlement
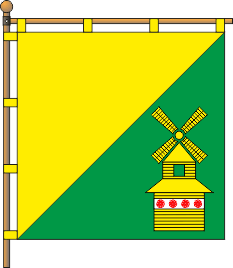
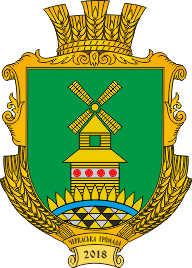
- Flag Coat of arms

- Location of Cherkaske within Donetsk Oblast#Location of Cherkaske within Ukraine Cherkaske (Ukraine)
- Coordinates: 48°50′30″N 37°23′10″E
- Country: Ukraine
- Oblast: Donetsk Oblast
- Raion: Kramatorsk Raion
- Hromada: Cherkaske settlement hromada
- Elevation: 79 m (259 ft)

Population (2022)
  - Total: 3,151
- Time zone: UTC+2 (EET)
  - Summer (DST): UTC+3 (EEST)
- Postal code: 84162-84166
- Area code: +380 626

Cherkaske (Ukrainian: Черкаське) is a rural settlement in Kramatorsk Raion, Donetsk Oblast, eastern Ukraine. Population: 3,151 (2022 estimate).
