= Mikhail Dudin =

Russian poet, writer and translator (1916–1993)

- Михаил Александрович Дудин
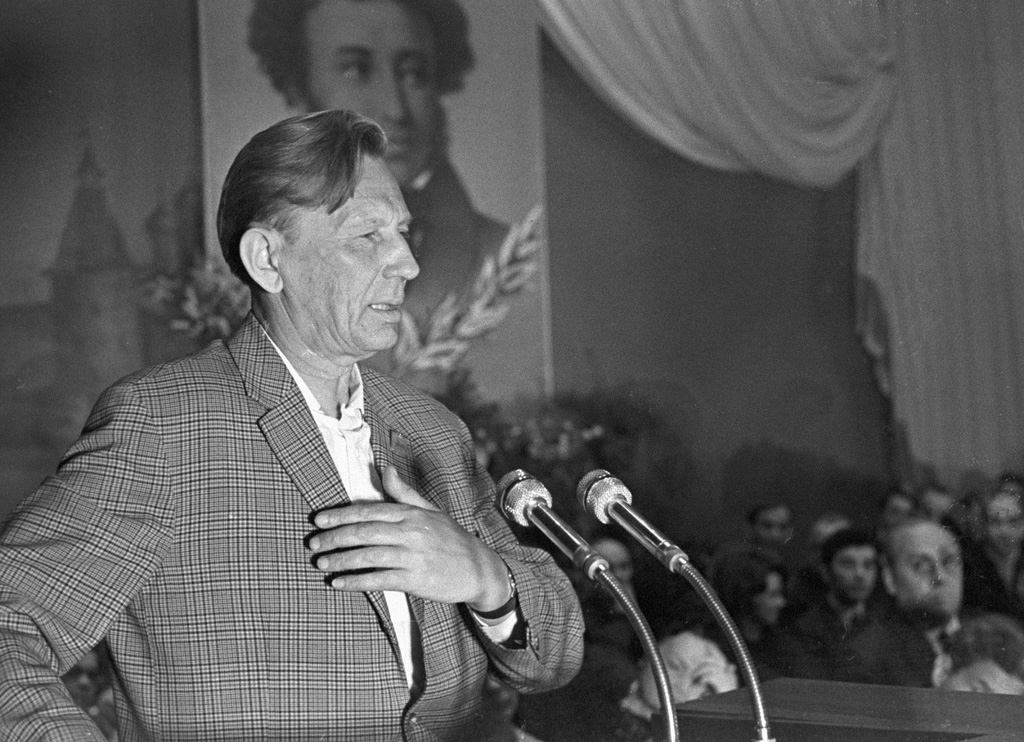
- Mikhail Dudin in Pskov
- Born: Mikhail Aleksandrovich Dudin; November 20, 1916; Klevnevo Village, Nerekhtsky District, Kostroma Governorate, Russian Empire
- Died: December 31, 1993 (aged 77); St. Petersburg, Russia
- Resting place: Ivanovo Oblast
- Education: Ivanovo State University
- Occupation: Poet
- Spouse: Irina Tarsanova
- Children: 1
- Writing career
- Language: Russian
- Genre: Socialist realism

Mikhail Aleksandrovich Dudin (Russian: Михаил Александрович Дудин; 20 November [O.S. 7 November] 1916 – 31 December 1993) was a Russian Soviet prose writer, poet, translator and journalist, war correspondent. Public figure, screenwriter, author of lyrics and over 70 books of poetry. Hero of Socialist Labor (1976), laureate of the USSR State Prize (1981).
