= Vitaly Popkov =

Soviet Union fighter pilot

Vitaly Ivanovich Popkov
- Виталий Иванович Попков
- Born: 1 May 1922; Moscow, RSFSR
- Died: 6 February 2010 (aged 87); Moscow, Russian Federation
- Military career
- Allegiance: Soviet Union
- Branch: Soviet Air Force
- Service years: 1940–1989
- Rank: General-Lieutenant of Aviation
- Unit: 5th Guards Fighter Aviation Regiment
- Conflicts: World War II
- Awards: Hero of the Soviet Union (twice)

Vitaly Ivanovich Popkov (Russian: Виталий Иванович Попков; 1 May 1922 – 6 February 2010) was a Soviet fighter pilot who became a flying ace during the Second World War. During the war, he was credited with around 40 aerial victories for which he was twice awarded the title Hero of the Soviet Union. After the war he remained in the military and reached the rank of general-lieutenant, retiring in 1989. He died in 2010 at the age of 87.

== Early life ==
Popkov was born on 1 May 1922 to a working class Russian family in Moscow; he grew up in Sochi from 1930 to 1934 before moving to Abkhazia. After graduating from the Gagra Glider School in 1938 he returned to Moscow, where he went on to graduate from his tenth grade of school and aeroclub training before entering the military in September 1940. Upon graduating from the Chuguev Military Aviation School of Pilots in September 1941 he began further training at the Batay Military Aviation School of Pilots, which had been relocated to Azerbaijan due to the war. After graduating in March he was posted to the 4th Reserve Aviation Regiment based in Morshansk.

== World War II ==
In May 1942 Popkov arrived at the warfront as a pilot in the 5th Guards Fighter Aviation Regiment. Upon seeing one of the LaGG-3 aircraft used by the regiment parked at the airfield he became very excited and jumped into the plane to check out the cockpit, but was stopped by a soldier on duty and told to wait for his shift. Soon he had a turn to fly it, and on 10 June he shot down his first enemy aircraft, a Ju 88. On 3 August 1942 he was shot down, but survived the incident with severe burns and shrapnel wounds having parachuted out. The next month he gained his third and last aerial victory while flying the LaGG-3 before moving on to flying the La-5, which he flew for most of the war and gained most of his shootdowns on, having flown it in "free-hunting" missions. Popkov quickly rose through the ranks of his unit, reaching the position of flight commander by the time he was first nominated for the title Hero of the Soviet Union in August 1943 for having shot down 17 enemy aircraft over the course of 168 sorties.

On 16 August 1944 Popkov was again injured in combat after his plane was hit by an anti-aircraft shell during a mission to attack an enemy airfield. Wounds to his right hand and right leg forced him to steer his plane with his left hand, but nevertheless he managed to issue instructions to the aircraft under his command and make a safe landing at their destination airfield; later that month he was promoted to the rank of captain. At the time he was nominated for his second gold star in February 1945 he had reached the position of squadron commander in addition to having just gained his first aerial victories on the La-7 earlier that month. By the end of the war he was credited with 345 sorties, (Note: Some sources indicate 358 sorties) 85 aerial engagements, and an estimated 40 (Note: Sources differ as to if he had 40 or 41 aerial victories) aerial victories (one of which was an enemy aircraft rammed during a mid-air collision); seven of the aircraft he shot down were multi-engined. Throughout the conflict he participated in Rzhev-Sychev, Little Saturn, Luhansk, Izyum-Barvenkovo, Belgorod-Kharkov, Donbas, Zaporizhia, Dnepropetrovsk, Lvov-Sandomierz, Sandomierz-Silesian, Lower Silesian, Berlin and Prague battles.

== Postwar ==
Until March 1946 Popkov remained a squadron commander in his wartime regiment, during which he was stationed in Austria and Hungary. He then briefly served as squadron commander in the 721st Fighter Aviation Regiment until July that year when he left to join the Air Force Academy. After graduating in 1951 he served as commander of the 925th Fighter Aviation Regiment until May 1954, after which he commanded the 24th Guards Fighter Aviation Division until December 1955. From then until 1956 he served as assistant commander of the Air Force of the 4th Navy. He then became the assistant commander of the Baltic Fleet Air Force, and in 1958 he assumed the role of deputy commander. That same year he was promoted to the rank general-major, but it was not until 1962 that he entered the Military Academy of General Staff, which he graduated from in 1964 with honors.

From 1964 to 1966 Popkov headed a department at the Directorate of the General Staff, and from then until 1980 he served as inspector-general of Aviation for the Air Force Naval Inspectorate. He then became the head of faculty for training foreign specialists, and from 1987 until he retired he was head of special faculty at the Zhukovsky Air Force Academy. During his career he flew many aircraft including the Yak-9, MiG-15, MiG-17, Tu-16, and An-24. After retiring from the military with the rank of general-lieutenant in 1989, he lived in Moscow where he died on 6 February 2010 and was buried in the Novodevichy cemetery.

== Awards ==
Soviet

- Twice Hero of the Soviet Union (8 September 1943 and 27 June 1945)
- Honoured Military Pilot of the USSR (8 July 1967)
- Three Orders of Lenin (26 August 1942, 8 August 1943, and 28 September 1956)
- Two Orders of the Red Banner (30 July 1943 and 6 April 1955)
- Order of Alexander Nevsky (17 August 1944)
- Two Orders of the Patriotic War of 1st class (23 May 1943 and 11 May 1985)
- Order of the Patriotic War 2nd class (29 May 1945)
- Two Orders of the Red Star (30 December 1956 and 27 December 1982)
- Order for Service to the Homeland in the Armed Forces of the USSR 3rd class (17 February 1976)
- campaign and jubilee medals

other states

- Russia – Order of Honor (9 May 2007)
- Russia – Order of Merit for the Fatherland 4th class (20 May 2002)
- Ukraine – Order of Merit 3rd class (6 May 2005)
- Hungary – Order of the Flag of the People's Republic 2nd class (4 April 1985)
- Bulgaria – Order of 9 September 1944 (14 September 1974)

He was an honorary citizen of Moscow Magadan, Sochi, Kiev, Odessa, Dnepropetrovsk, Gagry, Prague, Vienna, Budapest, Bratislava, Parndorfa and Krasnika.
