= Sigizmund Kats =

Soviet composer

Sigismund Abramovich Katz (Russian: Сигизмунд Абрамович Кац; April 4, 1908 – June 17, 1984), was a Soviet Jewish composer who specialized in writing popular songs. One of the founding fathers of the genre of the Soviet "mass song", Katz became famous in the 1940s and 1950s. His songs ranged from lyrical serenades and ballads to marches and quasi-Straussian waltzes. Sigizmund Katz' professional reputation now rests primarily on his war-time song "And the Briansk Forest Rustled Sternly" (Шумел сурово Брянский лес...), with lyrics by Anatoly Sofronov, which is dedicated to the struggles of Soviet partisans against Nazi invaders, and which earned him the Stalin Prize (1950).

== Selected filmography ==
- Happy Flight (1949)
