= Troitske, Kramatorsk Raion, Donetsk Oblast =

Troitske Троїцьке
- Village
- Interactive map of Troitske
- Location of Troitske within Ukraine Troitske (Donetsk Oblast)
- Coordinates: 48°49′30″N 37°20′0″E
- Country: Ukraine
- Oblast: Donetsk Oblast
- District: Kramatorsk Raion
- Elevation: 86 m (282 ft)

Population (2001 census)
  - Total: 375
- Time zone: UTC+2 (EET)
  - Summer (DST): UTC+3 (EEST)
- Postal code: 84161
- Area code: +380 626

Troitske (Ukrainian: Троїцьке; Russian: Троицкое) is a village in Kramatorsk Raion (district) in Donetsk Oblast of eastern Ukraine, at about 50.00 kilometres (31.07 mi) northwest (NW) from the centre of Donetsk city, on the right bank of Sukhyi Torets River.

== Demographics ==
As of the 2001 Ukrainian census, the settlement had 375 inhabitants. Their native languages were 95.83% Ukrainian, 3.03 Russian and 0.76% Hungarian.
