= Leonid Bykov =

Soviet actor and filmmaker (1928-1979)

- Born: Leonid Fedorovych Bykov; 11 December 1928; Znamenske, Sloviansk Raion, Ukrainian SSR, USSR
- Died: 11 April 1979 (aged 50); En route from Minsk to Kyiv
- Resting place: Baikove Cemetery, Kyiv
- Education: Kharkiv National Kotlyarevsky University of Arts (1951)
- Occupations: Actor, film director, screenwriter
- Years active: 1952–1979
- Notable work: Only "Old Men" Are Going Into Battle (1973)
- Title: Honored Artist of the RSFSR (1965) People's Artist of Ukraine (1974)
- Awards: Shevchenko National Prize

Leonid Fedorovych Bykov (Ukrainian: Леонід Федорович Биков, Russian: Леонид Фёдорович Быков; 11 December 1928, in Znamenka village, Artemivsk Okruha of Ukrainian SSR – 11 April 1979, in Kyiv Oblast of Ukraine, USSR) was a Soviet actor, film director, and script writer. He received the "Honored Artist of the RSFSR" title in 1965 and the "People's Artist of the Ukrainian SSR" title in 1974.

== Life and career ==
Leonid Bykov was born in the Znamenske village into a peasant family of Fyodor Ivanovich Bykov and Zinaida Pankratovna Bykova, who shared the same surname. He had an elder sister, Luisa (born 1927). His father was a simple laborer who took part in World War I and the Russian Civil War and in 1930 moved his family to Kramatorsk to work at the local steel mill, and where Leonid finished secondary school.

Bykov initially attempted to become a military pilot. He later studied at Kharkiv Theater Institute from 1946 to 1951 and joined the troupe of the Taras Shevchenko Theater in Kharkiv, working on stage until 1960. He received recognition initially with the supporting role of an unsophisticated countryman in Marina's Destiny (1953). His other notable performances included Petya Mokin in Aleksandr Ivanovski's and Nadezhda Kosheverova's blockbuster comedy Tamer of Tigers (1955) and in the title role of Maksim Perepelitsa (1956). Bykov also appeared as a hopeless romantic in films such as Yuri Egorov's Volunteers (1958), Stanislav Rostotskii's May Stars (1961), and Iosif Kheifits's My Dear Man (1958). As a director, Bykov debuted at Lenfilm Studio in 1962 with the 10-minute satire However the Rope Is Twisted (co-directed by Gerbert Rappaport), which skewered absurdities of the Soviet economy. The popular comedy Bunny (1965), in which Bykov also played the lead, portrays an idealistic man who struggles against bureaucracy. His most famous films as director are World War II dramas Only "Old Men" Are Going Into Battle (1974) and One-Two, Soldiers Were Going... (1977), in which he also starred.

Bykov died in a traffic accident in 1979 on the highway from Minsk to Kyiv. In 1994, the International Astronomical Union named a minor planet after him, (4682) Bykov.

== Selected filmography ==
=== Actor ===
- Marina's Destiny (1953)
- Tamer of Tigers (1954–1955)
- Other People's Relatives (1955)
- Maksim Perepelitsa (1955)
- The Volunteers (1958)
- May Stars (1959)
- Alyosha's Love (1960)
- Be Careful, Grandma! (1960)
- No Rope Curls (1961)
- Seven Winds (1962)
- The Horizon (1962)
- Little Hare (1964)
- In S. City (1966)
- The Scouts (1968)
- Where are you, Knights? (1971)
- Only "Old Men" Are Going Into Battle (1973)
- One-Two, Soldiers Were Going... (1976)

=== Film director ===
- No Rope Curls (1961)
- Little Hare (1964)
- Where are you, Knights? (1971)
- One-Two, Soldiers Were Going... (1976)
- Only "Old Men" Are Going Into Battle (1973)

=== Screen writer ===
- Only "Old Men" Are Going Into Battle (1973)
