= List of Soviet films of 1964 =

A list of films produced in the Soviet Union in 1964 (see 1964 in film).

== 1964 ==
Title	Russian title	Director	Cast	Genre	Notes
1964
The Alive and the Dead	Живые и мертвые	Aleksandr Stolper	Kirill Lavrov, Viktor Avdyushko, Anatoli Papanov	War	
Attack and Retreat	Они шли на Восток	Giuseppe De Santis, Dmitri Vasilyev	Arthur Kennedy, Zhanna Prokhorenko, Raffaele Pisu, Tatyana Samojlova, Andrea Checchi	War film	Soviet-Italian co-production
Balzaminov's Marriage	Женитьба Бальзаминова	Konstantin Voynov	Georgy Vitsyn, Lyudmila Shagalova, Lidiya Smirnova, Yekaterina Savinova	Comedy	
The Big Ore	Больша́я руда	Vasiliy Ordynskiy	Yevgeni Urbansky, Mikhail Gluzsky, Larisa Luzhina, Stanislav Lyubshin, Inna Makarova	Drama	
The Blizzard	Метель	Vladimir Basov	Oleg Vidov, Valentina Titova, Georgy Martyniuk	Drama	
The Chairman	Председатель	Aleksei Saltykov	Mikhail Ulyanov, Ivan Lapikov, Nonna Mordyukova, Vyacheslav Nevinnyy, Valentina Vladimirova	Drama	Second Prize at All-Union Film Festival in Kiev (1968)
Come Here, Mukhtar!	Ко мне, Мухтар	Semyon Tumanov	Yuri Nikulin, Dyck, Vladimir Yemelyanov, Leonid Kmit	Drama	
Comrade Arseny	Товарищ Арсений	Ivan Lukinsky	Roman Khomyatov	Drama	
Don Tale	Донская повесть	Vladimir Fetin	Yevgeny Leonov	Drama	
An Easy Life	Лёгкая жизнь	Veniamin Dorman	Yury Yakovlev, Faina Ranevskaya, Nadezhda Rumyantseva	Comedy	
The Enchanted Desna	Зачарованная Десна	Yuliya Solntseva	Boris Andreyev, Yevgeni Bondarenko, Vladimir Goncharov, Zinaida Kiriyenko	Fantasy	Won the Special Jury Prize at the San Sebastián International Film Festival.
Father of a Soldier	Отец солдата	Rezo Chkheidze	Sergo Zaqariadze, Vladimir Privaltsev, Aleksandr Nazarov, Aleksandr Lebedev, Yuri Drozdov	Drama	
Footprint in the Ocean	След в океане	Oleg Nikolayevsky	Ada Sheremetyeva	Adventure	
The Garnet Bracelet	Гранатовый браслет	Abram Room	Ariadna Shengelaia	Drama	
Goodbye, Boys	До свидания, мальчики!	Mikhail Kalik	Natalya Bogunova	Drama	
The Green Flame	Зелёный огонёк	Villen Azarov	Aleksei Kuznetsov	Comedy	
Hamlet	Гамлет	Grigori Kozintsev	Innokenty Smoktunovsky, Mikhail Nazvanov, Elze Radzinya, Anastasiya Vertinskaya	Tragedy	
I Am Cuba	Я Куба	Mikhail Kalatozov	Sergio Corrieri, Salvador Wood, José Gallardo, Jean Bouise	Drama	
Jack Frost	Морозко	Aleksandr Rou	Alexander Khvylya, Natalya Sedykh, Eduard Izotov, Inna Churikova	Fairy tale	
Kingdom of Crooked Mirrors	Королевство Кривых Зеркал	Aleksandr Rou	Olga Yukina, Tatyana Yukina, Andrei Fajt, Arkadi Tsinman, Lidiya Vertinskaya	Fairy tale	
Left-Hander	Левша	Ivan Ivanov-Vano		Animation	
The Light of a Distant Star	Свет далёкой звезды	Ivan Pyryev	Lionella Pyryeva	Romance	
Little Hare	Зайчик	Leonid Bykov	Leonid Bykov	Comedy	
An Ordinary Miracle	Обыкновенное чудо	Erast Garin, Khesya Lokshina	Aleksey Konsovsky, Nina Zorskaya, Oleg Vidov, Erast Garin	Romantic fantasy	
A Span of Earth	Пядь земли	Andrey Smirnov and Boris Yashin	Aleksandr Zbruyev	Drama	
A Tale of Lost Times	Сказка о потерянном времени	Aleksandr Ptushko	Grigoriy Plotkin, Vera Volkova, Lidia Konstantinova	Fantasy	
There Is Such a Lad	Живёт такой парень	Vasily Shukshin	Leonid Kuravlyov, Lidiya Chaschina, Larisa Burkova, Renita Grigoryeva, Nina Sazonova	Comedy	
Two on the Steppes	Двое в степи	Anatoly Efros	Valeri Babyatinsky	Drama	
Uninvented Story	Непридуманная история	Vladimir Gerasimov	Zhanna Prokhorenko	Drama	
Welcome, or No Trespassing	Добро пожаловать, или Посторонним вход воспрещён	Elem Klimov	Viktor Kosykh, Yevgeniy Yevstigneyev, Arina Aleynikova, Ilya Rutberg	Comedy	
Yor-yor	Где ты, моя Зульфия?	Ali Hamroyev	Sohib Xoʻjayev	Comedy	
The Lark	Жаворонок	Nikita Kurikhin, Leonid Menaker	Gennadi Yukhtin, Valeri Pogoreltsev, Valentins Skulme, Bruno Oja, Ervin Abel	War drama	Entered into the 1965 Cannes Film Festival
