= Ivan Lapikov =

Russian actor

- Иван Лапиков
- Lapikov in Andrei Rublev (1966)
- Born: 7 July 1922; Gorny Balykley, Saratov Governorate, Russian SFSR
- Died: 2 May 1993 (aged 70); Kalininets, Russia
- Resting place: Vagankovo Cemetery
- Occupation: Actor
- Years active: 1942–1993

Ivan Gerasimovich Lapikov (Note: Russian: Иван Герасимович Лапиков, romanized: Ivan Gerasimovich Lapikov) (7 July 1922 – 2 May 1993) was a Soviet and Russian actor and People's Artist of the USSR for the year 1982.

== Biography ==
Lapikov was born in the village of Gorny Balykley, near Tsaritsyn (now – Dubovsky District, Volgograd Oblast). He spent his childhood in Stalingrad.

In 1939, he enrolled in drama school in Kharkov, where he studied for the following two years. After the beginning of World War II, Ivan started to work in the Gorky Drama Theater (Stalingrad). There, he worked until he moved to Moscow in 1963. In Moscow, Lapikov joined the Film Actor's Theater-Studio.

His first role in cinema was in the film The Reserve Player (1954). After The Chairman by Alexey Saltykov (1964), where the actor had played the brother of the lead character, Lapikov became famous. Later he created a whole gallery of the Russian characters: playing Kirill in Andrei Rublev, Lyagavy in The Brothers Karamazov, Pankrat Nazarov in Eternal Call, and many other roles.

== Filmography ==
Year	Title	Role	Co-actors	Director	Producer	Notes
1954	The Reserve player	Seer-off	Georgy Vitsin, Nikolai Rybnikov	Semyon A. Timoshenko	Lenfilm	
1956	The Soldiers	Zabavnikov	Innokenty Smoktunovsky	Aleksandr G. Ivanov	Lenfilm	
1961	A Business Trip	Tatyanych	Oleg Yefremov, Vasily Shukshin, Yevgeny Vesnik	Yuri P. Yegorov	Gorky Film Studio	
1963	If You Are Right...	Yefim Golubev, Chairman of the Collective Farm	Stanislav Lyubshin	Yuri P. Yegorov	Gorky Film Studio	
1964	The Wagtail's Army	Wounded Man	Gunārs Cilinskis, Ivan Kuznetsov	Aleksandrs Leimanis	Riga Film Studio	
1964	The Chairman	The chairman's brother, Semyon Trubnikov	Mikhail Ulyanov, Nonna Mordyukova, Vyacheslav Nevinny, Vitaly Solomin	Aleksei Saltykov	Mosfilm	
1964	Uncalled Love	Gavrila	Yuriy Nazarov	Vladimir V. Monakhov	Mosfilm	
1965	Our House	Uncle Kolya	Anatoli Papanov, Nina Sazonova	Vasily M. Pronin	Mosfilm	
1966	Andrei Rublev	Kirill	Anatoly Solonitsyn, Nikolai Grinko, Nikolai Burlyayev, Irma Raush	Andrei Tarkovsky	Mosfilm	
1966	Horseman Over the City	The Ayna's Grandfather	Yevgeniy Yevstigneyev	Igor V. Shatrov	Gorky Film Studio	
1967	The House and the Owner	Yegor Baynev		Budimir A. Metalnikov	Mosfilm	
1967	The Journalist	Pustovoytov	Galina Polskikh, Lyusyena Ovchinnikova, Vasily Shukshin, Annie Girardot, Mireille Mathieu, Yuri Vasilyev	Sergei Gerasimov	Gorki Film Studio	
1968	The Serafim Frolov's Love	cameo	Leonid Kuravlyov, Zhanna Prokhorenko, Gennadi Yukhtin	Semyon I. Tumanov	Mosfilm	
1968	Through the Rus	Father Ioannes		Fyodor Filippov	Mosfilm	
1969	The Brothers Karamazov	Lyagavy	Andrey Myagkov, Kirill Lavrov, Mikhail Ulyanov, Tamara Nosova	Kirill Lavrov, Ivan Pyryev, Mikhail Ulyanov	Mosfilm	
1970	Merry-Go-Round	Portrait of Iona	Vladimir Basov, Yevgeny Leonov, Vyacheslav Tikhonov	Mikhail Schweitzer	Mosfilm	
1970	About the Comrades	Uncle Fedya, an Old Chekist	Valeri Zolotukhin, Pyotr Glebov, Nina Agapova, Igor Starygin	Vladimir Nazarov	Mosfilm	Composer – Karen Khachaturian
1970	Forfeit	Personnel Director	Oleg Yankovsky, Victoria Fyodorova, Lyubov Sokolova, Armen Dzhigarkhanyan	Fyodor Filippov	Mosfilm	
1970	The Silver Trumpets	Peasant	Andrey Myagkov, Irina Alfyorova, Mikhail Yanshin	Eduard Bocharov	Gorky Film Studio	
1970	The Firekeepers	Danila Makarovich	Yevgeny Matveyev, Tamara Syomina	Yevgeny Karelov	Mosfilm	
1971	Yegor Bulychyov and Others	Fool-for-Christ	Yekaterina Vasilyeva, Rimma Markova, Nina Ruslanova, Georgi Burkov, Lev Durov	Sergei Solovyov	Mosfilm	
1971	Moment of Silence	Soldier Boris Krayushkin	Yuri Kuzmenkov, Yuri Katin-Yartsev, Nikolai Volkov (Jr.)	Igor Shatrov	Gorky Film Studio	
1973-1983	The Eternal Call	Pankrat Nazarov	Pyotr Velyaminov, Oleg Basilashvili, Yefim Kopelyan, Ada Rogovtseva, Vadim Spiridonov	Valeri Uskov, Vladimir Krasnopolski	Mosfilm	TV series
1973	Comrade General	Executive Officer	Igor Ledogorov, Vladimir Kashpur, Leonid Kulagin, Olga Gobzeva	Teodor Y. Vulfovich	Mosfilm	
1974	Front without Flanks	Yerofeich	Ivan Pereverzev, Vladimir Ivashov, Vladimir Zamansky	Igor Gostev	Mosfilm	The first part of the Gostev's war trilogy
1975	They Fought for Their Country	Poprischenko	Vasily Shukshin, Yuri Nikulin, Sergei Bondarchuk, Vyacheslav Tikhonov, Nikolai Gubenko, Yevgeni Samoylov, Nonna Mordyukova	Sergei Bondarchuk	Mosfilm	Written by Mikhail Sholokhov
1977	The Stepp	Panteley the Pilgrim	Vladimir Sedov, Nikolay Trofimov, Igor Kvasha	Sergei Bondarchuk	Mosfilm	
1977	Front behind the Front-line	Yerofeich	Yuri Tolubeyev, Nina Menshikova, Tatyana Bozhok, Marina Dyuzheva, Afanasy Kochetkov	Igor Gostev	Mosfilm	The second part of the Gostev's war trilogy
1978	Father Sergius	The Old Man on the Ferry	Valentina Titova, Nikolai Gritsenko, Lyudmila Maksakova	Igor Talankin	Mosfilm	
1979	Little Tragedies	Priest	Georgi Taratorkin, Sergei Yursky, Natalya Belokhvostikova, Ivars Kalniņš, Larisa Udovichenko	Mikhail Schweitzer	Studio Ekran	
1979	Poem about the Wings	Yesaul	Nikolay Annenkov, Georgi Yepifantsev, Aleksandr Galibin	Daniil Khrabrovitsky	Mosfilm, ICAIC (Cuba), DEFA (East Germany), Gaumont	
1980	The Youth of Peter the Great	Blacksmith Zhemov	Tamara Makarova, Natalya Bondarchuk, Oleg Strizhenov, Boris Khmelnitsky	Sergei Gerasimov	Gorky Film Studio	The first part of the Gerasimov's historical film
1980	At the Beginning of the Glorious Deeds	Blacksmith Zhemov	Dmitri Zolotukhin, Aleksey Mironov, Ulrike Mai	Sergei Gerasimov	Gorky Film Studio	The second part of the Gerasimov's historical film
1981-1982	The Young Russia	The Bishop of Kholmogory, Afanasy	Aleksandr Fatyushin, Nikolay Olyalin, Aleksandra Yakovleva, Oleg Borisov	Ilya Gurin	Gorky Film Studio	
1981	Front in the Enemy's Rear	Yerofeich	Valeriya Zaklunna, Aleksandr Mikhaylov, Mikhail Kokshenov, Yevgeny Leonov-Gladyshev	Igor Gostev	Mosfilm, Barrandov Studios	The third part of the Gostev's war trilogy
1984	Before We Part	Uncle Pasha	Natalya Fateyeva, Nikolai Karachentsov, Klara Luchko, Yuri Antonov, Igor Kostolevsky	Aleksandr Kosarev	Mosfilm	
1985	Budulay's Return	Old Man, Vasily	Mihai Volontir, Klara Luchko, Nina Ruslanova, Ivan Ryzhov	Aleksandr Blank	Studio Ekran	
1986	Boris Godunov	Blind Man	Sergei Bondarchuk, Roman Filippov, Yelena Bondarchuk, Irina Skobtseva, Fyodor Bondarchuk, Olgierd Łukaszewicz	Sergei Bondarchuk	Mosfilm, Barrandov Studios	
1988	Itinerant Folk	Buturlin	Aleksandr Filippenko, Boris Nevzorov, Andrey Martynov	Ilya Gurin	Gorky Film Studio	
1988	Lord, Let Me Die...	Ivan Ivanovich, Film Director	Galina Polskikh, Sergei Filippov, Vladimir Grammatikov	Boris Grigoryev	Gorky Film Studio	
1989	Souvenir for the Prosecutor	The Chief Regional Prosecutor	Galina Belyayeva, Svetlana Toma, Aleksander Serov	Aleksandr Kosarev	Sverdlovsk Film Studio	
1993	Black Devil	Old Man	Mikhail Gluzsky, Natalya Gundareva, Oleg Stefanko	Aleksandr Kosarev	Mosfilm	
1994	House on the Rock		Juozas Budraitis, Irina Kupchenko, Svetlana Svetlichnaya	Aleksandr Khryakov	Valir-Film	
1994	Quiet Flows the Don	Old Cossack	Rupert Everett, F. Murray Abraham, Natalya Andreychenko, Vladimir Gostyukhin, Boris Shcherbakov	Sergei Bondarchuk	Madison Motion Pictures	Based on the M. Sholokhov's masterpiece

== Awards ==
- Honored Artist of the RSFSR (1965)
- People's Artist of the RSFSR (1974)
- People's Artist of the USSR (1982)
- USSR State Prize (1979)
- Lenin Komsomol Prize (1979)
- Vasilyev Brothers State Prize of the RSFSR - 1973

== Legacy ==
- The Lapikov Museum, in the village of Gorny Balykley
- Memorial plaque to Ivan Lapikov at the house in Volgograd where he lived
