= No Return (1973 film) =

- Russian: Возврата нет
- Directed by: Aleksei Saltykov
- Written by: Aleksei Saltykov; Anatoli Kalinin
- Starring: Nonna Mordyukova; Vladislav Dvorzhetsky; Olga Prokhorova; Nikolai Yeremenko Jr.; Tatyana Samoylova
- Cinematography: Boris Brozhovsky
- Edited by: Yelena Klimenko; Klavdiya Moskvina
- Music by: Andrei Eshpai
- Production company: Mosfilm
- Release date: 1973
- Running time: 99 minute
- Country: Soviet Union
- Language: Russian

No Return (Russian: Возврата нет, romanized: Vozvrata net) is a 1973 Soviet romantic drama film directed by Aleksei Saltykov.

== Plot ==
The love story of Antonina and the battalion commander Nikitin, whom she sheltered after being seriously wounded. They want to expel Antonina Kashirina from the party, accusing that during the war the Don Cossack woman lived in the territory occupied by the Germans. They do not believe her that she hid and left the wounded Soviet officer.

Unable to withstand offensive suspicions, she leaves the party committee bureau. On the way home, Tonya recalls how she picked up a bleeding artilleryman battalion commander Nikitin, covered him and treated him, how she fell in love.

== Cast ==
- Nonna Mordyukova as Antonina Kashirina
- Vladislav Dvorzhetsky as Nikolay Yakovlevich Nikitin
- Olga Prokhorova as Irina Alekseyevna
- Nikolai Yeremenko Jr. as Grigory, Antonina's son
- Tatyana Samoylova as Nastyura Shevtsova
- Boris Kudryavtsev as Pavel Ivanovich Neverov
- Aleksey Batalov as Aleksey Vladimirovich Yegorov
- Nina Menshikova as Antonina Ivanovna Korotkova
- Vilnis Bekeris as German corporal
- Alexey Borzunov as Konstantin Sukharev
