= Budimir Metalnikov =

Soviet Russian film director and screenwriter

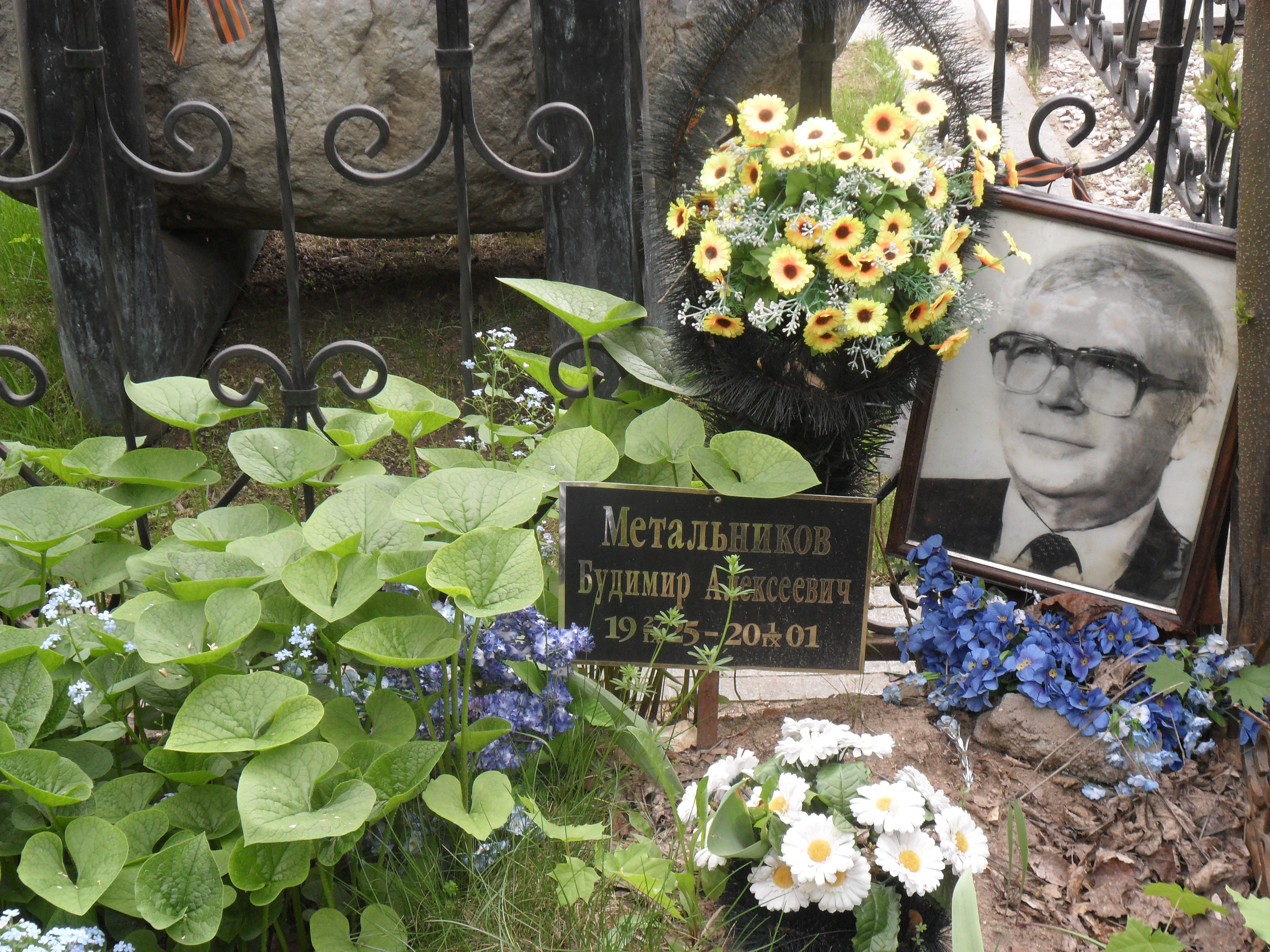
- Metalnikov’s grave at Vagankovo Cemetery in Moscow
- Born: Budimir Alekseyevich Metalnikov; 27 September 1925; Moscow, RSFSR, Soviet Union
- Died: 1 September 2001 (aged 75); Moscow, Russia
- Resting place: Vagankovo Cemetery
- Education: Gerasimov Institute of Cinematography
- Occupations: Film director, screenwriter
- Years active: 1956–1993

Budimir Alekseyevich Metalnikov (Russian: Будимир Алексеевич Метальников; 27 September 1925 – 1 September 2001) was a Soviet and Russian film director and screenwriter.

== Early years ==
Metalnikov was born in Moscow into an educated Russian family of chemical engineers. His father Aleksei Petrovich Metalnikov came from peasants. He was working as the chief engineer at the Apatit enterprise when he was arrested in 1937. Budimir's mother Zinaida Georgiyevna Metalnikova was also arrested shortly after. The 12-year-old Budimir and his 3-year-old sister Marina were taken to the NKVD reception center for children of enemies of the people situated in the Danilov Monastery. The children were then separated and put into different orphanages; Metalnikov never managed to find his sister, despite all his attempts. In 1939 he was sent to Kirovohrad to study in one of the vocational schools to be an electrician. After a while he received a letter from his aunt along with some money and returned to Moscow where he continued studying.

In 1942 Metalnikov was enrolled to the Red Army. After some studying in the infantry school and serving in the airborne brigade he was sent to fight at the Karelian Front. He was heavily wounded during one of the battles and spent many months in hospitals. In October 1944 he was sent home as war-disabled. On his return he entered an evening school, but soon left it to study screenwriting at VGIK under Yevgeny Gabrilovich and Ilya Vicefield. He graduated in 1954 and immediately started working in cinema.

== Career ==
His first success came with a movie A Home for Tanya directed by Lev Kulidzhanov in 1959. Seen by 25.2 million people at the time of release, it competed for the Palme d'Or at the 1959 Cannes Film Festival. His next screenplay was made into A Simple Story movie by the director Yuri Yegorov and released in 1960 to even a greater success: with 46.8 million viewers it became one of the box office leaders and the 48th most popular Soviet movie of all time. It featured an ensemble cast of the acclaimed Russian actors: Nonna Mordyukova, Mikhail Ulyanov and Vasily Shukshin. Mordyukova's character was partly inspired by her own personality and was written specially for her.

1969 saw the release of the biographical film Tchaikovsky directed by Igor Talankin and co-written by Budimir Metalnikov and Yuri Nagibin. It featured Innokenty Smoktunovsky in the leading role of the famous Russian composer Pyotr Ilyich Tchaikovsky. In 1972 the movie was nominated for two Oscars: Academy Award for Best Foreign Language Film and Academy Award for Best Scoring: Adaptation and Original Song Score. It was also nominated for the 1971 Golden Globe Award for Best Foreign Language Film.

Between 1955 and 2001 Metalnikov wrote screenplays to 20 Soviet and Russian movies, including three movies directed by himself. He had been also working as an educator at High Courses for Scriptwriters and Film Directors since 1966.

He mainly specialized in social dramas and village dramas in particular. The themes featured in his screenplays were similar to the Village Prose movement, but usually with an emphasis on the relationships between people rather than collective farming and other problems of the Soviet countryside. His works are distinguished by their romantic tone and humor. A conflict between rural community and townspeople is also a running theme in many of his movies.

Among the other themes he explored was science fiction. In 1973 he directed The Silence of Dr. Evans, a drama about a contact between humans and an advanced alien society based on the original screenplay, with Sergei Bondarchuk in the leading role of Dr. Martin Evans. In this film Metalnikov focused on a number of philosophical topics, including moral values of the human society. In 1987 he co-wrote a screenplay for another science fiction movie The End of Eternity based on the novel of the same name by Isaac Asimov and directed by Andrei Yermash. The movie was noted for many stylistic similarities to Stalker by Andrei Tarkovsky, with the soundtrack also written by Eduard Artemyev.

Budimir Metalnikov died on September 1, 2001. He was buried at the Vagankovo Cemetery.

== Filmography ==
Year	Title	Original title		
Year	Title	Original title	Director	Screenwriter
1959	A Home for Tanya	Отчий дом		✓
1960	Alyosha's Love	Алёшкина любовь		✓
1960	A Simple Story	Простая история		✓
1966	Women	Женщины		✓
1967	The House and the Owner	Дом и хозяин	✓	✓
1969	Tchaikovsky	Чайковский		✓
1973	The Silence of Dr. Evans	Молчание доктора Ивенса	✓	✓
1973	Of Those I Remember and Love	О тех, кого помню и люблю		✓
1981	Three Times About Love	Трижды о любви		✓
1986	Coasts in the Mist	Берега в тумане		✓
1987	The End of Eternity	Конец вечности		✓
2004	Salamandra's Skin	Кожа саламандры		✓

== Awards and honors ==
- Order of the Badge of Honour (1975)
- Honored Art Worker of the RSFSR (1978)
- Order of the Patriotic War, 2nd class (1985)
- Order of Friendship of Peoples (1985)
- Order of the Red Banner of Labour

== Literature ==
Budimir Metalnikov (2006). I Will Tell You ... Memoirs. — Moscow: Russkiy impuls, 464 pages. ISBN 5-902525-10-1
