= Alexey Saltykov (director) =

Soviet director (1934–1993)

Aleksey Saltykov
- Born: Aleksey Aleksandrovich Saltykov; 13 May 1934; Moscow, USSR
- Died: 8 April 1993 (aged 58); Moscow, Russia
- Occupations: Film director, screenwriter

Aleksey Aleksandrovich Saltykov (Russian: Алексей Александрович Салтыков; 13 May 1934 – 8 April 1993) was a Soviet and Russian film director and screenwriter. People's Artist of the RSFSR (1980).

== Biography ==
Saltykov was born in Moscow to Russian parents. His father Aleksandr Saltykov worked as an engineer at the Moscow Kremlin. With the start of the Great Patriotic War he was sent to the front line and killed near Sevastopol in 1941. His family stayed in Moscow. Aleksey's mother baptized him and his sister shortly before the Battle of Moscow, which they eventually survived. She never married again and raised the children by herself.

At the age of 14 Saltykov had to become a factory worker because of the poor living conditions. He also visited an evening school and at one point decided to join VGIK. In 1961 he finished director's courses led by Sergei Gerasimov. His first feature film My Friend, Kolka! was released the same year, co-directed by Aleksander Mitta. It was seen by 23.8 million viewers. Along with his next movie Bang the Drum it established him as one of the most promising children's film directors, but Saltykov decided otherwise.

In 1964 he directed a post-war drama The Chairman. Based on the screenplay by Yuri Nagibin, it told a fictionalized story of a real-life Belarusian partisan Kirill Orlovsky (named Egor Trubnikov in the movie) who lost his arm during the war, then headed one of the ruined kolkhozes and turned it into the most prosperous countryside. He was portrayed by Mikhail Ulyanov in The Chairman. The movie also featured a number of themes unusual for the cinema of that era, including post-war hunger, bureaucracy that prevented quicker recovery, lack of men and repressive methods of NKVD. At the same time, it showed the strength of village people who rebuilt the countryside from scratch despite everything.

According to Aleksander Mitta, five leading Mosfilm directors rejected the script before it finally got to Saltykov. Seen by 33 million people at the time, The Chairman became an instant success. It was awarded a prize at the All-Union Film Festival and named the best movie of 1965 by the readers of the Soviet Screen magazine. Mikhail Ulyanov was also named the best actor of 1965 and awarded the Lenin Prize. The role of Trubnikov became one of his most recognizable roles in the entire career.

Saltykov made another three movies based on Nagibin's screenplays: Woman's World (1967), Director (1969) and The Ivanov Family (1975). Woman's World featured a story similar to The Chairman, but with an emphasis on Russian women during and after the war. It became one of the leaders of the 1968 box office (4th place with 49.6 million viewers) and the 38th most viewed film of the Soviet Union. Rimma Markova was named the best actress at the 1970 All-Union Film Festival.

Director was dedicated to Ivan Likhachov (named Aleksey Zworykin in the movie) who established the automotive industry in the Soviet Union, headed ZiL, and who happened to be Nagibin's father-in-law. Shooting began at the start of 1965, but ended after Yevgeni Urbansky was tragically killed while performing a stunt. Saltykov was personally blamed for his death and wasn't allowed to direct anything up until 1967. In 1969 the second version of Director was made with Nikolai Gubenko as Zworykin, released to a mild success.

He produced a number of other historical and war dramas, but none of them reached the triumph of his earlier works. According to the writer Nikolai Konyaev, in 1993 Saltykov approached him with documents from previously closed Soviet archives regarding general Andrey Vlasov known for his Nazi collaboration during the World War II. Together they wrote a screenplay for a biographical movie, but in just a week Saltykov suddenly died at the age of 58.

Aleksey Saltykov was buried in Moscow at the Troyekurovskoye Cemetery. He was married to the Soviet and later Canadian actress Olga Prokhorova (born 1948).

== Filmography ==
| Year | Title | Original title | | | |
| Year | Title | Original title | Director | Screenwriter | Notes |
|---|---|---|---|---|---|
| 1959 | Boys from Our Courtyard | Ребята с нашего двора | ✓ | ✓ | short |
| 1961 | My Friend, Kolka! | Друг мой, Колька! | ✓ | | with Aleksander Mitta |
| 1962 | Bang the Drum | Бей, барабан! | ✓ | | |
| 1964 | The Chairman | Председатель | ✓ | | |
| 1967 | Woman's World | Бабье царство | ✓ | | |
| 1969 | Director | Директор | ✓ | | |
| 1971 | It was an Evening and It was a Morning | И был вечер, и было утро... | ✓ | | |
| 1972 | The Siberian Woman | Сибирячка | ✓ | | |
| 1973 | No Return | Возврата нет | ✓ | ✓ | |
| 1975 | The Ivanov Family | Семья Ивановых | ✓ | | |
| 1978 | Pugachev | Емельян Пугачёв | ✓ | | also producer |
| 1981 | Woodworm: Bitter Grass | Полынь — трава горькая | ✓ | | |
| 1983 | Immortality Examination | Экзамен на бессмертие | ✓ | ✓ | |
| 1984 | Mr. Veliky Novgorod | Господин Великий Новгород | ✓ | ✓ | |
| 1986 | The Dolphin's Cry | Крик дельфина | ✓ | | |
| 1988 | All Costs Paid | За всё заплачено | ✓ | ✓ | |
| 1992 | Storm Over Russia | Гроза над Русью | ✓ | ✓ | |
