= All Costs Paid =

- Written by: Alexander Prokhanov; Alexey Saltykov
- Directed by: Alexey Saltykov
- Starring: Vladimir Litvinov Aleksandr Barinov; Aleksey Buldakov; Viktor Pavlov; Olegar Fedoro; Lev Borisov; Alim Kouliev Vladimir Nosik
- Music by: Igor Nazaruk
- Country of origin: Soviet Union
- Original language: Russian

Production
- Producer: Natalya Strelnikova
- Cinematography: Aleksandr Riabov
- Running time: 230 min.
- Production company: Studio EKRAN

Original release
- Release: 1988

All Costs Paid (Russian: За всё заплачено translit. Za vsyo zaplacheno) is a Soviet TV miniseries produced by Studio Ekran. The director Alexey Saltykov well known for his film The Chairman (Russian: "Председатель" translit. "Predsedatel") with Mikhail Ulyanov, an acclaimed Russian actor playing a main character. All Costs Paid is one of the first Soviet feature films that shows the war in Afghanistan. Film has unusually truthful point of view on that period of Soviet Era and on the Soviet–Afghan War.

After the war several Russian ex-soldiers go to Siberia to raise money for a memorial to their friends killed in Afghanistan.

== Plot ==
In Afghanistan, a crew of Soviet soldiers led by Warrant Officer Semyonov protects a convoy of fuel trucks but soon faces an ambush by local "dushmans" (mujahideen fighters). Despite the threat, they risk their lives to rescue the convoy's wounded driver and push through the dangerous terrain, only to see one of their youngest soldiers, Kotenochkin, die in combat. Back in Siberia, as Kotenochkin's wife mourns, Semyonov and his fellow veterans take on a mission to construct a gas pipeline, aiming to honor their fallen comrade by bringing heat to a frigid town. However, they encounter hostility from Pavel Khramov, who oversees the site and resents the veterans' presence, denying them equipment and supplies. Despite these challenges, Semyonov's team resorts to manual labor, drawing ridicule from Khramov's crew. The veterans persevere, steal abandoned machinery from a nearby station, and fend off local thugs, gradually earning respect for their determination and work ethic.

As construction progresses, the team faces increasingly severe hardships, including sabotage by Khramov's men and violence from local criminals led by "Maradona." After witnessing the deadly toll of Semyonov’s unrelenting mission, including the fatal accident of Khramov and the brutal stabbing of his friend Bozman, Semyonov finally confronts the cost of their efforts. Injured, exhausted, and denied wages by indifferent bureaucrats, he contemplates the sacrifices made by his team. Yet, he perseveres, ceremoniously opening the gas distribution station as a tribute to his comrades, symbolizing resilience against corruption and apathy. At Kotenochkin’s grave, he meets Valya, the soldier’s widow, and reflects on the ideals that drive him. Though encouraged to leave his harsh life behind, Semyonov remains steadfast, believing that unwavering standards of courage and integrity uphold the world, even if they come at a high personal cost.

== Cast ==
- Vladimir Litvinov – Semyonov
- Aleksandr Barinov – Botsman
- Olegar Fedoro – Mafioso Maradona
- Vladimir Nosik – Dusya
- Irina Senotova – Lilya
- Alim Kouliev – Urka
- Viktor Pavlov – Snegirev
- Lev Borisov – Maligin
- Aleksey Buldakov – Khramov
- Mikhail Gilevich – Alyes
- Valeriy Afanaseyev – Bogdanov
- Vladimir Timofeyev – Ruchiyov
- Raimondas Paskevicius – Rimondas
- Vera Ivleva – Mother
