= Woman's World (1967 film) =

- Directed by: Alexey Saltykov
- Written by: Yuri Nagibin
- Starring: Rimma Markova; Nina Sazonova
- Cinematography: Gennadiy Tsekaviy; Viktor Yakushev
- Edited by: M. Dimitrato
- Music by: Andrei Eshpai
- Production company: Mosfilm
- Release date: 1967
- Running time: 97 minutes
- Country: Soviet Union
- Language: Russian

Woman's World (Russian: Бабье царство, romanized: Babye tsarstvo) is a 1967 war film directed by Alexey Saltykov. The film was a box-office leader in the USSR in the year 1968, fourth place 49.6 million viewers.

== Plot ==
The film is about a simple female kolkhoz farmer, who heads the women of the village during the war and the horror of the Nazi occupation which deprives her of her son, her husband and her home ...

== Cast ==
- Rimma Markova as Nadezhda Petrovna
- Nina Sazonova as Anna Sergeevna
- Alexandra Dorokhin as Marina, wife of Jean
- Svetlana Sukhovey as Dunyasha Noskova
- Valentina Stolbova as Sophia, the wife of Basil
- Svetlana Zhgun as Nastya
- Vitaly Solomin as Kostya Lubentsov
- Aleksei Krychenkov as Kolya, son of Nadezhda Petrovna
- Aleksandr Grave as store manager
- Fyodor Odinokov as Vasily Petrichenko
- Yefim Kopelyan as Nazi commandant Caspar

== Awards ==
- VKF (All-Union Film Festival)
  - 1970 — Diploma and Award for Best Actress (Rimma Markova)
- San Sebastián International Film Festival
  - 1968 — Special Diploma for Best Actress (Rimma Markova)
