= The Land of Sannikov =

- Original film poster
- Directed by: Albert Mkrtchyan; Leonid Popov
- Written by: Vladislav Fedoseyev; Vladimir Obruchev (novel); Mark Zakharov
- Starring: Vladislav Dvorzhetsky; Oleg Dahl; Yuriy Nazarov; Georgy Vitsin; Makhmud Esambayev
- Cinematography: Mikhail Koroptsov
- Edited by: Lyudmila Feiginova
- Music by: Aleksandr Zatsepin
- Distributed by: Mosfilm
- Release date: 1974
- Running time: 92 min.
- Country: Soviet Union
- Language: Russian

The Land of Sannikov (Russian: Земля Санникова, romanized: Zemlya Sannikova) is a Soviet 1974 adventure film about the fictional Sannikov Land loosely based on the 1924 novel of the same name by Vladimir Obruchev.

== Plot ==
The exiled settler Alexander Ilyin persuades the gold mine owner Trifon Perfilyev to sponsor the expedition dedicated to the search for "Sannikov Land", a legendary warm land behind the polar circle. Hoping that this land could be filled with gold, Perfilyev agrees. A few more daredevils volunteer for the mission. The finally gathered crew consists of Ilyin himself, officer Evgeniy Krestovskiy, Perfilyev's servant Ignatiy, who is given a task of killing every other crew member in case they really find any gold, and Gubin, a Katorga runaway and a former doctor.

After a long journey, they reach the volcanic land and meet the natives – a tribe of "Onkilon". However they soon find out that the volcano is cooling down quickly, and the legendary land is about to start to freeze so that its unique ecosystem is doomed. Gubin chooses to stay with the Onkilons so as to share his knowledge and help them through the disaster, Ignatiy is killed, Krestovskiy falls from a cliff, and Ilyin has to return alone. Exhausted, he is picked up in the wilderness by Yakut hunters. As they carry him to safety, he watches the migrating birds overhead flying to the Sannikov Land, still unaware of its demise.

== Cast ==
- Vladislav Dvorzhetsky as Ilyin
- Oleg Dahl as Evgeniy Krestovskiy
- Yuriy Nazarov as Gubin
- Georgy Vitsin as Ignatiy
- Makhmud Esambayev as Shaman
- Nikolai Gritsenko as Trifon Stepanovich Perfilyev
- Alyona Chukhray
- Gevork Chepchyan
- Pyotr Abasheyev
- Tursun Kuralyev
- Yekaterina Sambuyeva
- Nasira Mambetova
- Sergei Polezhayev
- Aleksandr Susnin
- Nikolai Kryukov as naval officer

== Soundtrack ==
Film featured two popular songs, written by Aleksandr Zatsepin and Leonid Derbenyov and performed by Oleg Anofriyev. The first of them achieved near-cult status:

1. "There's just a moment..." ("Est' tol'ko mig")
2. "All has been" ("Vsyo bylo")
