= Yegor Bulychyov and Others =

- Russian: Егор Булычов и другие
- Directed by: Sergey Solovyov
- Written by: Maxim Gorky; Sergey Solovyov
- Produced by: Lazar Milkis
- Starring: Mikhail Ulyanov; Maya Bulgakova; Yekaterina Vasilyeva; Zinaida Slavina; Anatoli Romashin; Yevgeny Steblov
- Cinematography: Leonid Kalashnikov
- Edited by: A. Abramovich
- Music by: Isaac Schwartz
- Production company: Mosfilm
- Release date: 1971
- Running time: 85 min.
- Country: Soviet Union
- Language: Russian

Yegor Bulychyov and Others (Russian: Егор Булычов и другие, romanized: Yegor Bulychyov i drugiye) is a 1971 Soviet drama film directed by Sergey Solovyov.

== Plot ==
The film tells about a large Russian timber merchant Yegor Bulychov, who is experiencing an internal conflict and a conflict with the surrounding unfair world.

== Cast ==
- Mikhail Ulyanov as Yegor Bulychov
- Maya Bulgakova as Kseniya, Bulychov's wife
- Yekaterina Vasilyeva as Aleksandra
- Zinaida Slavina as Varvara
- Anatoli Romashin as Zvontsov
- Yevgeny Steblov as Tyatin
- Valentina Sharykina as Elizaveta
- Rimma Markova as Abbess Melanya, wife's sister
- Nina Ruslanova as Glafira
- Yefim Kopelyan as Vasily Dostigaev
- Georgy Burkov as Alexey Dostygaev
- Yuriy Nazarov as Yakov Laptev, Bulychov's godson
- Vladimir Yemelyanov as Mokei Petrovich Bashkin
- Lev Durov as trumpeter Gavrila
- Vyacheslav Tikhonov as priest Pavlin
- Ivan Lapikov as Fool-for-Christ
