= Mr. Veliky Novgorod =

1984 film by Aleksei Saltykov

- Russian: Господин Великий Новгород
- Directed by: Aleksei Saltykov
- Written by: Yuri Limanov; Aleksei Saltykov
- Starring: Oleg Strizhenov; Vyacheslav Yezepov; Zinaida Kirienko; Elena Antonenko; Lionella Pyryeva
- Cinematography: Aleksandr Ryabov
- Music by: Yuri Butsko
- Release date: 1984
- Running time: 96 minute
- Country: Soviet Union
- Language: Russian

Mr. Veliky Novgorod (Russian: Господин Великий Новгород, romanized: Gospodin Veliky Novgorod) is a 1984 Soviet war film directed by Aleksei Saltykov.

The film takes place in August 1941, when Novgorod was preparing for defense. The city committee receives an order to leave the city. They go underground and organize a partisan movement there.

== Plot ==
In August 1941, Novgorod prepares for defense during the early stages of World War II. The city committee, ordered to leave the city, goes underground and initiates a partisan movement. It is also crucial to save the priceless museum collections and cultural artifacts. Two train cars of treasures were evacuated to Kirov in July, and the last barges, loaded with large artifacts like the Sigtuna and Korsun Gates of Saint Sophia Cathedral and massive bells from the belfry, left just before the city was abandoned on August 19, 1941.

Upon entering the city, the Germans celebrate their capture with a torchlit procession around the Millennium of Russia monument. Seeking the whereabouts of the Saint Sophia bells, they gather civilians in St. George’s Cathedral of the Yuriev Monastery, lock them inside, and attempt to blow up the building. Unexpectedly, the cathedral withstands the explosion.

The narrative of the Great Patriotic War alternates with historical flashbacks, showing Alexander Nevsky’s fight against foreign invaders. The Teutonic Knights, after gathering the people, melt down one of the church bells in a bonfire.

In the story, the Germans plan to destroy the ancient Russian city completely, sending a barge loaded with TNT. The partisans attempt to save Novgorod by organizing a sabotage at the pier, with one of them sacrificing himself to blow up the barge.

== Cast ==
- Oleg Strizhenov
- Vyacheslav Yezepov
- Zinaida Kirienko
- Elena Antonenko
- Lionella Pyryeva
- Mikhail Zhigalov
- Aleksandr Zhigalov
- Aleksandr Kuznetsov
- Dmitri Balashov
- Dmitri Pisarenko
- Aleksandr Kazakov
