= Director (1969 film) =

- Russian: Директор
- Directed by: Alexey Saltykov
- Written by: Yury Nagibin
- Starring: Nikolay Gubenko; Svetlana Zhgun; Boris Kudryavtsev; Vladimir Sedov; Anatoly Eliseev; Robert Daglish
- Cinematography: Gennadi Tsekavyj; Viktor Yakushev
- Edited by: Lyudmila Pechieva
- Music by: Andrei Eshpai
- Production company: Mosfilm
- Release date: 1969
- Running time: 151 min.
- Country: Soviet Union
- Language: Russian

Director (Russian: Директор) is a 1969 Soviet drama film directed by Alexey Saltykov.

== Plot ==
The film takes place during the end of the civil war in Russia. The film tells about the sailor Alexey, who becomes the director of the automobile plant. He is trained by Ford in the United States, produces the first Soviet lorry and participates in the international rally in Kara-Kuma.

== Cast ==
- Nikolay Gubenko as Alexey Svorykin
- Svetlana Zhgun as Sanya Zvorykina
- Boris Kudryavtsev as Stepan Ruzayev
- Vladimir Sedov as Knyzh
- Anatoly Eliseev as Baraksin
- Robert Daglish as American
- Vsevolod Shilovsky as Ptashkin
- Bukhuti Zakariadze as Magarayev (voiced by Yefim Kopelyan)
- Aleksey Krychenkov as Sukharik
- Valentina Berezutskaya as Fenochka
- Fyodor Odinokov as Ivan Kuzin
