= My Friend, Kolka! =

- Directed by: Aleksei Saltykov; Aleksander Mitta
- Written by: Aleksander Khmelik
- Starring: Anatoly Kuznetsov; Saveliy Kramarov; Yuri Nikulin
- Cinematography: Victor Maslennikov
- Music by: Lev Shvarts; Bulat Okudjava(songs)
- Production company: Mosfilm
- Release date: 1961
- Running time: 88 minutes
- Country: USSR
- Language: Russian

My Friend, Kolka! (Russian: Друг мой, Колька!, romanized: Drug moy, Kolka!) is a Soviet 1961 teen drama film directed by Aleksei Saltykov and Aleksander Mitta.

== Plot ==
Kolka Snegeryov is bored at school along the other children. The work of the pioneer organization turned into a monotonous routine. The senior Pioneer leader Lydia Mikhajlovna's work seems good. But behind accurately made plans are formalism, indifference and boredom. Declaring boycott, children organize a secret society which has the acronym ТОТР – "To help offended and weak ". New pioneer leader supports children and carries away their greater and interesting business.

== Cast ==
- Aleksandr Kobozev as Kolka Snegiryov
- Anna Rodionova as Masha Kanareikina
- Alexey Borzunov as Yura Ustinov
- Viktor Onuchak as Fedya Drankin
- Tatyana Kuznetsova as Klava Ogorodnikova
- Antonina Dmitriyeva as Ivanova
- Anatoly Kuznetsov as Rudenko
- Vitali Ovanesov as Valeri Novikov
- Lidiya Chernyshyova as Novikova
- Boris Novikov as Kuzma
- Igor Kosukhin as Isayev
- Savely Kramarov as Pimen
- Valery Ryzhakov as schoolboy
- Anatoli Eliseev as criminal man
- Yuri Nikulin as Vaska
- Yevgeni Teterin as school principal
- Svetlana Kharitonova as Yevgenia Petrovna
- Aleksandr Lebedev as pioneer leader from School #23
- Oleg Vidov as motorcyclist
