= Alyosha's Love =

1960 film

- Russian poster
- Russian: Алёшкина любовь
- Directed by: Georgi Shchukin; Semyon Tumanov
- Written by: Budimir Metalnikov
- Produced by: Naum Polyak
- Starring: Leonid Bykov; Aleksandra Zavyalova
- Cinematography: Konstantin Petrichenko
- Edited by: Esfir Tobak
- Music by: Vladimir Rubin
- Production company: Mosfilm
- Release date: 1960
- Running time: 88 minutes
- Country: Soviet Union
- Language: Russian

Alyosha's Love (Russian: Алёшкина любовь, romanized: Alyoshkina lyubov) is a 1960 Soviet romantic comedy-drama film directed by Georgi Shchukin and Semyon Tumanov.

== Plot ==
A modest guy, a drilling geologist, loves the beautiful and provocative switchman Zina. The faithful and boundless love of Alyosha gradually awakens her reciprocal feeling, which makes others look with different eyes at the inconspicuous guy.

== Cast ==
- Leonid Bykov as Alyosha
- Aleksandra Zavyalova as Zina
- Alexey Gribov as Zina's grandfather
- Yuri Belov as Arkady
- Ivan Savkin as Nikolai
- Vladimir Gulyaev as Sergey
- Ivan Ryzhov as Volkov
- Igor Okhlupin as Zina's boyfriend
- Pyotr Sobolevsky as Belogorov

== Production ==
Leonid Kuravlyov, Anatoly Kuznetsov and Leonid Kharitonov auditioned for the role of Alyoshka. Iya Arepina, Lyudmila Gurchenko and Izolda Izvitskaya auditioned for the role of Zina.
