= Captain Nemo (miniseries) =

1975 television miniseries

- Written by: Edgar Smirnov; Vasily Levin
- Directed by: Vasily Levin
- Starring: Vladislav Dvorzhetsky; Yuri Rodionov; Mikhail Kononov; Volodymyr Talashko
- Music by: Aleksandr Zatsepin
- Country of origin: Soviet Union
- Original language: Russian

Production
- Cinematography: Fyodor Silchenko
- Editor: E. Maiskaya
- Running time: 223 minutes
- Production company: Odessa Film Studio

Original release
- Release: 1975

Captain Nemo (Russian: «Капитан Немо», romanized: Kapitan Nemo) is a 1975 Soviet three-part television miniseries directed by Vasily Levin loosely based on the Jules Verne novels Twenty Thousand Leagues Under the Seas (1870), its 1874 sequel The Mysterious Island, and The Steam House (1880).

== Plot ==
=== Episode 1. "Iron Whale" ===
The second half of the 19th century. An unknown sea monster has been destroying and damaging warships of different countries for the last two years; those of them who get to the port find giant triangular holes in the sides. Sailing under threat, the United States equips the Blue Star military frigate to find and destroy the monster. Famous for his work on the mysteries of the depths of the sea, the French professor Pierre Aronax on the day of his wedding receives an invitation to join the punitive expedition and accepts it. After a three-month unsuccessful search in the ocean, the frigate discovers a monster and attacks it, but as a result gets damaged itself. The professor, his servant Conseil and Ned Land whaler fall overboard onto a submarine, which they initially mistake for a giant dangerous animal. An unnamed ship is called the Nautilus. The creator, owner and captain of the ship is called Nemo ("Nobody" - in Latin). He declares to the saved ones that they will remain on the Nautilus forever, so as not to be able to disclose his secret. Professor, Conseil and Land are forced to obey.

It turns out that Nemo and Aronax have long been acquainted in absentia: it was Nemo who read the work of the professor and realized that the author was genuinely fascinated by the sea and its secrets, from time to time sent sea wonders, sketches, photographs and descriptions to Aronax that refuted many of the professor's theoretical assumptions. Now the professor has been invited to study the depths of the sea "from within" - such a proposal can not fail to attract a true enthusiast. And the wife of Aronax, at the initiative of the captain, receives a letter from which she learns that her husband is alive.

Meanwhile, Ned Land only thinks about escaping. He finds François, a young sailor-Frenchman in the crew of the ship, at one time picked up by the captain in the sea and left on the Nautilus voluntarily. With his help, and also by observing what is happening, Land is looking for a suitable opportunity to run away. For the escape it is supposed to use a detachable underwater vehicle available on the ship. But "nothing can be done on this ship unnoticed", Francois says, which turns out to be true — as the first spontaneous attempt to escape does not succeed.

=== Episode 2. "Prince Dakkar" ===
Nautilus comes to the shores of India. The heroes make a walk along the seabed in diving suits, visit the pearl deposits, and soon they witness the visits to the Nautilus of the envoys from the shore and learn the story of Captain Nemo. In fact, the captain is a Hindu, Prince Dakkar, formerly known as Nana Sagib, the leader of the Sipai Rebellion, for whose head a price has been named. At one time, in order to catch Nana Sahibi, British Colonel Bunro captured his wife and children, for a long time persuaded his wife to extradite her husband and, drove her to insanity by organizing a fake execution of her children before the eyes of a woman. Later, Nana Sahib was captured by a betrayer of one of the companions among the other leaders of the sepoys, but Bunro left him alive, publishing in the newspapers the message that Nana Sahib had surrendered his companions to the Englishmen and was pardoned for this, and fabricating a photo confirming this message. Without yielding to the provocation of the British, loyal comrades liberated Nana Sagib and helped him escape. Thanks to the education received in Europe, Prince Dakkar designed and organized the construction of an underwater ship of fantastic qualities for his time and left with some of his faithful friends to sea. But, having left the earth, the captain's soul did not cease to ache for the people fighting against the colonizers. He continues to help the sepoys by transferring to them gigantic valuables collected on the seabed for the purchase of weapons.

=== Episode 3. "Nautilus continues to struggle" ===
In the meantime a pursuer is discovered. The English military frigate, armed with powerful cannons, depth charges and moving at the same speed as the Nautilus, pursues Captain Nemo on the way to Crete. On board the frigate - the same Colonel Bunro. Unlike Nemo, who knows his enemy exactly, he only foresees that he had already met with the captain of the submarine ship before, but he is absolutely sure that the Nautilus must be destroyed, since whenever it appears, the national liberation movement increases.

Nautilus is in an unfavorable position and cannot attack. Nemo tries to hide the ship in the crater of an extinct volcano, where it is possible to get underwater passage, but at the most inopportune moment the volcano wakes up. The exit is piled up, the Nautilus is trapped, the air remains only for several hours. Through titanic efforts of the entire team, including Professor, Conseil and Land, they manage to manually disassemble the dam and leave the dangerous shelter. To deceive the British, Nemo explodes tanks with a combustible substance in the water, so as to simulate the destruction of the ship, and the Nautilus escapes from pursuit.

Then the ship goes to the island of Crete, which rose against the Turkish invaders. There the captain again meets with the envoys of the rebels and provides them with gold. After that, having met in the sea the frigate-pursuer, Nautilus drowns him with a ramming blow. After a while, when the ship is off the coast of Norway, Land offers to try again to escape. At the last moment the fugitives learn that the ship is entering Malmstrom. Running here is almost a sure death, but it's too late to change their mind - everything seems hopeless and the apparatus is separated from the Nautilus and begins to ascend. Waves break it, and the characters are thrown into the water.

Despite everything, all three are alive. Nobody really remembers what happened, but everyone had the same feeling that at the last moment, when they were ready to sink to the bottom, someone helped to stay and get to the shore. On the Norwegian shore heroes find people and the last message from Captain Nemo - a letter in an iron box, which mysteriously appeared there. In the letter, Nemo says that he did not interfere with the escape, because the mystery of the Nautilus is uncovered and the fugitives no longer pose a danger to him. In the final shots Professor Aronax is at home, in the company of his wife and Conseil, giving an interview to a correspondent and talks about his plans for writing a book about an unusual subaquatic journey.

== Cast ==
- Vladislav Dvorzhetsky as Captain Nemo, who is also Prince Dakkar (Nana Sagib)
- Yuri Rodionov as Professor Aronax
- Mikhail Kononov as Conseil
- Volodymyr Talashko as Ned Land (voiced by Aleksei Safonov)
- Marianna Vertinskaya as Jacqueline Tussaud, the wife of Professor Aronax
- Viktor Demertash as Francois
- Aleksandr Porokhovshchikov as Captain Faragut
- Vladimir Basov as Royer (voiced by Vladislav Dvorzhetsky)
- Gennadi Nilov as Georges Sheino
- Zemfira Tsakhilova as Nemo's wife
- Nikolay Dupak as Colonel Bunro
- Yuri Menshagin as Ram
- Givi Tokhadze as Baiju

== Production ==
For the filming of interior episodes in the pavilions of the Odessa Film Studio interior decorations of the Nemo submarine were built, as well as the exterior elements of the ship. A submarine model was produced, which was filmed in the pool of the film studio. On-location shooting took place in Bilhorod-Dnistrovskyi, in Crimea, near the Artek, as well as at the Sevastopol Dolphinarium.

== See also ==
- List of underwater science fiction works
