= A Simple Story (1960 film) =

- Directed by: Yuri Yegorov
- Written by: Budimir Metalnikov
- Starring: Nonna Mordyukova; Mikhail Ulyanov; Vasily Shukshin
- Cinematography: Igor Shatrov
- Music by: Mark Fradkin
- Production company: Gorky Film Studio
- Release date: 1960
- Running time: 90 minutes
- Country: Soviet Union
- Language: Russian
- Box office: 46.8 million tickets sold

A Simple Story (Russian: Простая история, romanized: Prostaya istoriya) is a 1960 Soviet romantic drama film directed by Yuri Yegorov. The picture was the 48th most attended domestic film in the Soviet Union.

The film tells the story of a determined widow who becomes the first woman chairperson of a struggling collective farm, transforming it through resilience and leadership while navigating personal sacrifices, community dynamics, and her own evolving desires.

== Plot ==
In the collective farm "Zarya," the position of chairman frequently changes, with new appointees every year. During one of the meetings, where the district committee introduces yet another candidate, the young widow Aleksandra Potapova—who, like many women in the village, lost her husband during the Great Patriotic War—unexpectedly suggests that a woman should take on the role. To her surprise, the community elects her. Aleksandra begins her new duties with determination, despite not fully understanding the complexities of the position. She faces challenges in her relationships with villagers, particularly with the former chairman, Lykov, whose son Ivan she has been romantically involved with. Aware of the scrutiny she faces as chairwoman, Aleksandra ends her relationship with Ivan and focuses on her responsibilities. Over time, her hard work inspires the villagers, who begin to support her efforts. The farm merges with another struggling collective, gradually improving under her leadership.

Throughout her work, Aleksandra frequently interacts with Danilov, the district committee secretary, and falls in love with him. Although he reciprocates her feelings, Danilov cannot bring himself to make a change in his life. In the film's final scene, district officials arrive to offer Aleksandra the position of director at an advanced state farm equipped with modern technology and better living conditions. Initially, she agrees, but as she steps outside and sees her concerned fellow villagers silently opposing the idea, she decides to stay with her community.

== Cast ==
- Nonna Mordyukova as Sasha Potapova
- Mikhail Ulyanov as Secretary of the Communist Andrey Egorovich Danilov
- Vasily Shukshin as Vanka Lykov
- Daniil Ilchenko as Yegor Lykov, Ivan's father
- Valentina Vladimirova as Avdotya
- Irina Murzaeva as Sasha's mother
- Aleksey Mironov as Guskov
- Oleg Anofriev as Agronomist
- Tatyana Babanina as Nastassya Mineeva (as T. Babanina)
- Nina Sazonova as Lyuba

== Production ==
The character of Potapova was specifically written for Nonna Mordyukova. She was born in Kuban into a peasant family and her mother was a kolkhoz chairman.
