= Sannikov Land (novel) =

Novel by Vladimir Obruchev

Sannikov Land (Russian: Земля Санникова, Zemlya sannikova) is a novel by Vladimir Obruchev. It features Sannikov Land, an island which does not actually exist.

According to Ben Hellman, the novel resulted in Obruchev having "notable popularity".

His novel includes the author's reasoning on why islands in the Arctic Ocean belong to Russia.

It was adapted into The Land of Sannikov (1973).
