= Fyodor Odinokov =

Soviet actor

- Born: Fyodor Ivanovich Odinokov; 17 February 1913; Odoyevsky Uyezd, Tula Governorate, Russian Empire
- Died: 19 February 1994 (aged 81); Moscow, Russia
- Education: Boris Shchukin Theatre Institute
- Occupation: Actor
- Years active: 1938-1994

Fyodor Ivanovich Odinokov (Russian: Фёдор Ива́нович Одино́ков; 17 February [O.S. 4 February] 1913 — 19 February 1994) was a Soviet actor. He appeared in more than seventy films from 1938 to 1994.

== Selected filmography ==
Year	Title	Role	Notes
1938	Alexander Nevsky	gunner	
1940	The Foundling	passer	
1947	The Village Teacher	Bukov's guest	
1953	Silver Powder	deputy sheriff	
1957	Ekaterina Voronina	loader in port	
1960	Resurrection	prison guard	
1967	Woman's World	Vasily Petrichenko	
1968	At War as at War	Osip Byankin	
1969	Director	Ivan Kuzin	
1971	Trial on the Road	partisan Erofeich	
1971	Dauria	Epifan Kozulin	
1972	A Man at His Place	uncle Grisha	
1978	Pugachev	Khlopusha	
1979	Sherlock Holmes and Dr. Watson	Dr. Grimesby Roylott	
1980	Squadron of Flying Hussars	peasant-partisan	
1986	In Search for Captain Grant	Paddy O'Moore	TV series
1989	Love with Privileges	General	
