= Wind of Freedom =

- Russian: Вольный ветер
- Directed by: Leonid Trauberg; Andrey Tutyshkin
- Written by: V. Krakht; Viktor Tipot; V. Vinnikov
- Starring: Lionella Pyryeva; Nadezhda Rumyantseva; Aleksandr Lazarev; Nikolai Gritsenko; Mark Pertsovskiy
- Cinematography: Arkadi Koltsaty
- Release date: 1961
- Country: Soviet Union
- Language: Russian

Wind of Freedom (Russian: Вольный ветер) is a 1961 Soviet romantic musical film directed by Leonid Trauberg and Andrey Tutyshkin.

== Plot ==
The film takes place in a small port city in the South. The fascists left this place, as a result of which there was no one on the port quay. The port owner, George Stan, who collaborated with the Nazis, also left the city, but returned when he received the support of the authorities, and work began again in the port. Sailor Yango and his beloved girl named Stella are getting ready to start a family, and Georg in this time asks the girl's hands and hearts and with the help of deception he seeks a positive response. She learns that Stan has deceived her and runs off to Yango. And suddenly they find fascist weapons in the hold boxes.

== Cast ==
- Lionella Pyryeva as Stella (as L. Skirda)
- Nadezhda Rumyantseva as Peppita Diabolo (as N. Rumyantseva)
- Aleksandr Lazarev as Yango (as A. Lazarev)
- Nikolai Gritsenko as Georg Stan (as N. Gritsenko)
- Mark Pertsovskiy as Foma
- Yuriy Medvedev as Filip (as Yu. Medvedev)
- Ernst Zorin as Mikul (as Ernest Zorin)
- Vera Yenyutina as Klimentina (as V. Yenyutina)
- Larisa Pashkova as Regina (as L. Pashkova)
- Mikhail Yanshin as Ambrozio
