= Volodymyr Talashko =

Ukrainian actor

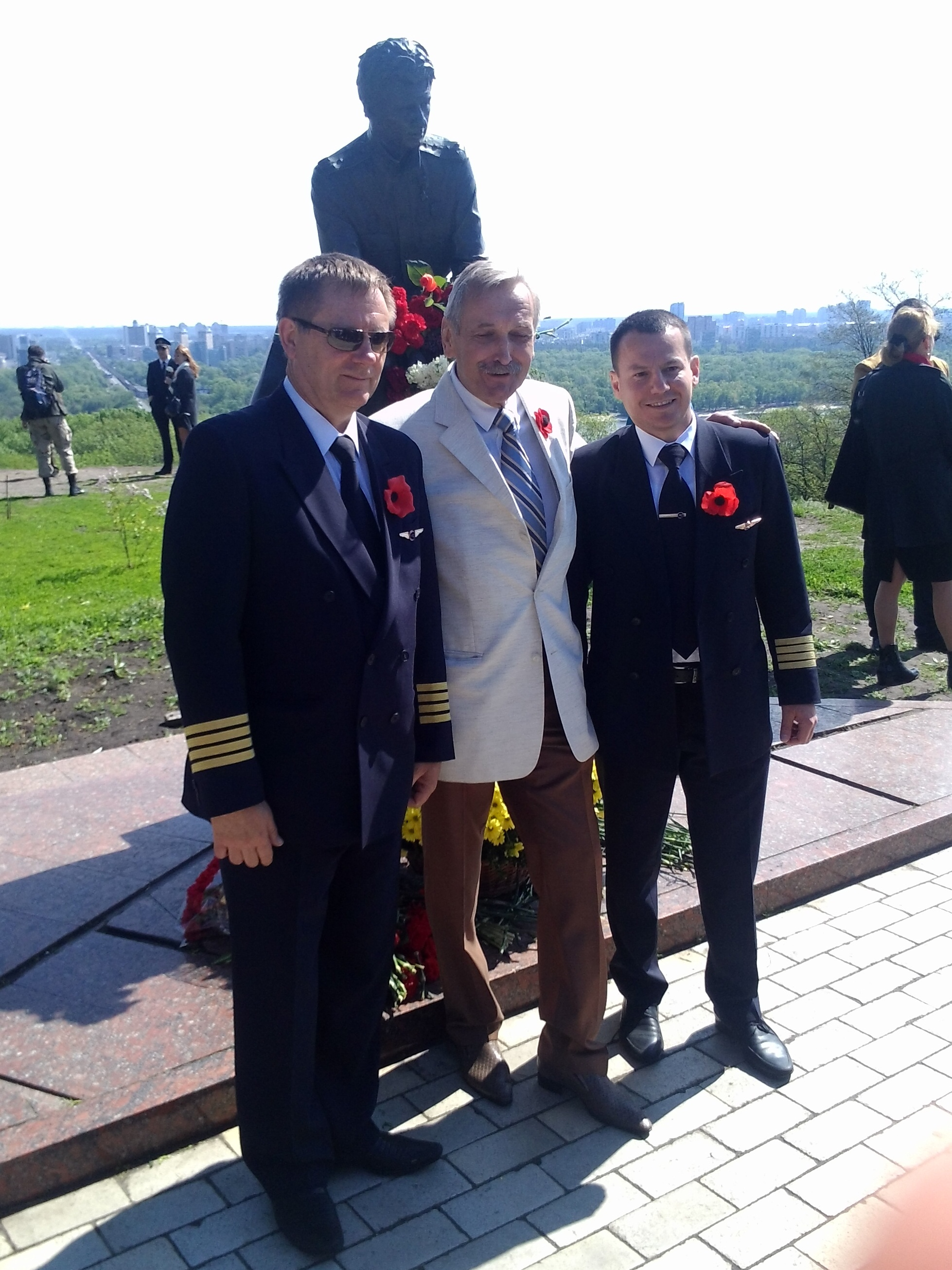
- Volodymyr Talashko in 2015
- Born: 6 March 1946 (age 80); Kovel, Ukrainian SSR, Soviet Union
- Occupation: Actor
- Years active: 1969–present

Volodymyr Dmytrovych Talashko (Ukrainian: Володимир Дмитрович Талашко; born March 6, 1946) is a Soviet and Ukrainian actor. Organizer Leonid Bykov Foundation. People's Artist of Ukraine (2002).

== Biography ==
Vladimir Talashko was born March 6, 1946, in the village of Hrabovo Volyn region, in miner's family. In the Donetsk National Academic Ukrainian Musical and Drama Theatre the future actor was literally off the street, not having special education. At the competition of amateur performances in Moscow, during one of the concerts of the young man, I remarked the director of the theater. The parents were against it, considering the profession of actor frivolous. Nevertheless, from 1963 to 1965 he worked as an actor in the Donetsk theater.

After serving military service in the Soviet army, he went to Kyiv to act in theater school. In 1972, Vladimir Talashko graduated from the Kyiv National I. K. Karpenko-Kary Theatre, Cinema and Television University.

Since 1972, an actor Dovzhenko Film Studios.

In August 2021, he found himself at the center of a scandal after receiving simultaneous accusations of harassment from several women. On August 8, 2021, theater critic and screenwriter Bohdan Pankrukhin published a post on Facebook with the stories of two specific girls. Later, similar accusations were made by other young women. The actor was accused by his students and former students, as well as by a journalist who alleged harassment during an interview. Minister of Culture and Information Policy Oleksandr Tkachenko said in his commentary that an internal investigation had been launched, and the university's vice-rector for research Halyna Mylenka said that the teacher had been suspended from teaching.

Volodymyr Talashko denies all the accusations: "This is a fake, a release of energy from people who want something. Nothing of the kind happened, nothing of the kind that is being said". Later, Volodymyr Talashko wrote a letter of resignation and stopped teaching at the university. His case became a precedent for an official investigation of harassment in a creative university with a successful resolution.

== Selected filmography ==
- Only Old Men Are Going to Battle (1973) as Skvortsov
- Captain Nemo (1975) as Ned Land
- The Fairfax Millions (1980) as Malcolm Treddic
- The Ballad of the Valiant Knight Ivanhoe (1983) as Messenger
- The Witches Cave (1991) as Aksel, ethnographer
