= Maya Bulgakova =

Soviet and Russian actress (1932–1994)

- Майя Булгакова
- Bulgakova in 1985
- Born: 19 May 1932; Buky, Kiev Oblast, Ukrainian SSR, Soviet Union
- Died: 7 October 1994 (aged 62); Moscow, Russia
- Occupation: Actress
- Years active: 1955–1996
- Spouse(s): Anatoly Nitochkin (divorced) Alexey Gabrilovich (divorced) Peter Dobias (died 1994)

Maya Grigoryevna Bulgakova (Russian: Майя Григорьевна Булгакова; 19 May 1932 – 7 October 1994) was a Soviet and Russian actress. She received the title of People's Artist of the RSFSR (1976).

== Biography ==
Bulgakova was born on 19 May 1932 in the village of Buky in the Ukrainian SSR. In 1941, the Bulgakov family moved to Kramatorsk, to this place they later returned from evacuation. In Kramatorsk, Bulgakova graduated from high school and decided after graduation to become an actress. In 1955, Bulgakova graduated from VGIK (actor's workshop of Olga Pyzhova and Boris Bibikov) and started working in the National Film Actors' Theatre. She made her debut film in Grigori Roshal's The Libertine. Bulgakova began to sing on stage with the Utesov orchestra and won a prize at the 1957 World Festival of Youth and Students in Moscow. The actress has become the first in the USSR to perform on the stage the songs of Edith Piaf.

After a decade of inactivity episodic roles, her first major work was in Wings. After that. Bulgakova began to have a high output of small rolls in film and episodes.

Bulgakova first married cinematographer Anatoly Nitochkin, and then had a second marriage with Aleksey Gabrilovich, the son of the prominent screenwriter Yevgeny Gabrilovich. The couple raised two daughters. One of them, Maria Gabrilovich, later became an actress. In the 1970s Bulgakova remarried to the Austrian communist Peter Dobias (1937–1994).

== Death ==
On 1 October 1994, Bulgakova and Lyubov Sokolova were in a car accident while on their way to a concert. The driver died at the scene; Bulgakova went into intensive care. Sokolova was released after a few weeks but Bulgakova died a few days later without regaining consciousness. Shortly before the accident, her husband died. A year later, her second husband Alexey Gabrilovich died.

== Filmography ==
- Resurrection (1960)
- Chronicle of Flaming Years (1961)
- An Easy Life (1964)
- Wings (1966)
- No Path Through Fire (1968)
- Crime and Punishment (1970)
- Trial on the Road (1971)
- Yegor Bulychyov and Others (1971)
- For the Rest of His Life (1975)
- The Adventures of the Elektronic (1979)
- The Youth of Peter the Great (1980)
- Farewell (1983)
- The Ballad of the Valiant Knight Ivanhoe (1983)
- Stalin's Funeral (1990)
- Terminal Velocity (1994)
