= The Chairman (1964 film) =

1964 film

- Directed by: Aleksei Saltykov
- Written by: Yuri Nagibin
- Starring: Mikhail Ulyanov; Ivan Lapikov; Nonna Mordyukova; Vyacheslav Nevinnyy; Valentina Vladimirova
- Cinematography: Vladimir Nikolayev
- Music by: Aleksandr Kholminov
- Production company: Mosfilm
- Distributed by: Soyuzkino
- Release date: December 28, 1964
- Running time: 166 minutes
- Country: Soviet Union
- Language: Russian

The Chairman (Russian: Председатель, romanized: Predsedatel) is a 1964 Soviet drama film directed by Aleksei Saltykov and starring Mikhail Ulyanov, Nonna Mordyukova and Ivan Lapikov. This film was honored with a Second Prize at All-Union Film Festival in Kiev (1966).

After World War II ends, soldier Yegor Trubnikov comes back to his native village to restore the ruined collective farm facilities. Rebuilding the kolkhoz is as hard for him as fighting the war. Becoming chairman, he charges himself with the burden of responsibility not only for the collective farm business, but also for the destiny of the people who are so close to him.

== Plot ==
After returning from the battlefields of the Great Patriotic War, veteran Yegor Trubnikov comes back to his native village to rebuild the devastated kolkhoz farm. The village is in ruins, populated primarily by widows and women who have lost their husbands to the war, and the community is grappling with extreme poverty. Determined to restore normalcy, Trubnikov takes charge as the kolkhoz chairman, applying his military experience to the challenges of post-war rural life.

Trubnikov leads the kolkhoz with a commanding and sometimes controversial approach. He pushes the villagers to work tirelessly to revive the farm, often treating the effort like a military campaign. He is forced to make tough decisions, including whom to send to study in the city and whom to keep in the village, creating conflicts within the community. His methods, though harsh, aim to uplift the kolkhoz and prevent further despair.

Amidst the struggles, Trubnikov faces resistance from bureaucratic authorities and skepticism from his own people. Despite these challenges, he perseveres, transforming the kolkhoz and inspiring hope in the villagers. His leadership becomes a symbol of resilience and determination in the face of overwhelming adversity.

== Trivia ==
The film (quite unusually for a Soviet movie) contains performance of a Christian religious hymn, Nearer, My God, to Thee (at 32nd minute).

== Cast ==
- Mikhail Ulyanov as Yegor Trubnikov
- Ivan Lapikov as Semyon Trubnikov
- Nonna Mordyukova as Donya Trubnikova
- Vyacheslav Nevinny as Pavel Markushev
- Valentina Vladimirova as Polina Korshikova
- Kira Golovko as Nadya
- Arkadi Trusov as Ignat Zakharovich
- Vladimir Gulyaev as Ramenkov, District Party Instructor
- Antonina Bogdanova as Praskovya
- Aleksandr Kashperov as Shiryaev, Blacksmith
- Aleksei Krychenkov as Alyoshka Trubnikov
- Larisa Blinova as Liza
- Nikolay Parfyonov as Klyagin, First Secretary of the District Party Committee
- Aleksandr Galchenkov as Boris
- Vladimir Etush as Colonel Kaloyev
- Sergei Kurilov as Kochetkov
- Sergei Blinnikov as Serdyukov
- Mikhail Kokshenov as Misha
- Yelizaveta Kuzyurina as Motya Postnikova
- Varvara Popova as Samokhina
- Vitali Solomin as Valyozhin, Physician
