= The Dolphin's Cry (film) =

- Directed by: Alexey Saltykov
- Written by: Nikolai Cherkashin
- Starring: Ivars Kalniņš; Donatas Banionis; Armen Dzhigarkhanyan
- Cinematography: Aleksandr Ryabov
- Music by: Georgy Garanian
- Production company: Mosfilm
- Release date: 13 April 1987 (Soviet Union)
- Running time: 90 minutes
- Country: Soviet Union
- Language: Russian

The Dolphin's Cry (Russian: Крик дельфина, romanized: Krik delfina) is a 1987 Soviet action drama film directed by Alexey Saltykov, based on the book by Nikolai Cherkashin "The Mystery of Archelon" "("The Dolphin's Cry").

== Plot ==
The crew of the new American strategic missile submarine "Archelon" is struck by an unknown virus. The command must decide on removing the submarine from combat duty and sending the crew to quarantine. The cause of the disease is discovered to be leakage of one of the warheads. There are no treatments and the crew is confined to the ship until an antidote is found.

Symptoms of the disease are similar to leprosy, and like leprosy, the disease lasts for a long time. "Archelon" as a result is under quarantine for about three years. The ship's psychologist observes the sailors are affected by barely restrained unmotivated aggression, and with every passing day it becomes more difficult for the captain to preserve at least the appearance of order. Eventually, the captain can no longer withstand the prolonged torture of this strange disease; after unsuccessful attempts to board the ships enforcing quarantine of "Archelon", he fakes the destruction of his submarine and gives the order to sink the passing vessels. In the end, he decides to destroy the whole mankind and release rockets equipped with the virus. At the last moment, the captain changes his mind and sends the boat into a vertical dive to the bottom of the ocean.

== Cast ==
- Ivars Kalniņš – Reeflint
- Donatas Banionis – Bar-Mattai
- Armen Dzhigarkhanyan – steward
- Yuri Vasiliev – O'Gregor
- Paul Butkevich – Roop
- Tatyana Parkina – Nika
- Nadezhda Butyrtseva – Magda
- Vilnis Becheris – doctor
- Vladimir Shubarin – Barney
- Romualds Antsans – Eppel
- Vladimir Episkoposyan – Sam
- Vytautas Tomkus – general
- Rostislav Yankovsky – minister
- Vitaly Yakovlev – submariner
- Andrey Podoshyan – Jack
- Sergey Roshynets is a navigator
- K. Mitaishvili – Fleggi
- I. Pogodin – Katarina
- M. Tolpigo – violist
