= Apple in the River =

1974 film

- Directed by: Aivars Freimanis
- Written by: Aivars Freimanis
- Cinematography: Dāvis Sīmanis
- Music by: Pēteris Plakidis
- Production company: Riga Film Studio
- Release date: 1974
- Running time: 76 minutes
- Country: Soviet Union
- Languages: Russian, Latvian

Apple in the River (Latvian: Ābols upē) is a 1974 Soviet drama film directed by Aivars Freimanis.

== Plot ==
Young docker acquainted with the student Anita, who came to Riga from a small fishing village. She accepted the invitation of the young man she liked to spend the evening at the club, where he played in amateur vocal and instrumental ensemble. After the dance, they go to Janis, but the next day Anita comes home unexpectedly. All attempts to find her Janis at the home of relatives in Riga fails.

== Cast ==
- Akvelīna Līvmane — Anita
- Ivars Kalniņš — Janis
