= Vladislav Dvorzhetsky =

Soviet actor (1939–1978)

- Born: 26 April 1939; Omsk, Soviet Union
- Died: 28 May 1978 (aged 39); Gomel, Soviet Union
- Other name: Vladislav Dvorjetzki
- Occupation: Actor
- Years active: 1970–1978
- Parent(s): Vatslav Dvorzhetsky, Taisiya Ray
- Awards: Shevchenko National Prize

Vladislav Vatslavovich Dvorzhetsky (Russian: Владислав Вацлавович Дворжецкий, 26 April 1939 – 28 May 1978) was a Soviet film actor. He appeared in eighteen films between 1970 and 1978.

Dvorzhetsky was born in Omsk. In 1955 he entered the Omsk military medical school. In 1959 he started active service in the Soviet Army at Sakhalin Island as senior feldsher of the regiment. During this time he married the first time.

In 1964 he went back to Omsk and entered the actors' school of Omsk. After graduation in 1967, Vladislav was accepted in the company of the Omsk provincial dramatic theatre. Here he married for the second time. In 1968 the assistant director from film-studio Mosfilm visits Omsk and Dvorzhetsky got his first role in a film as General Khludow in The Flight (1970). In his next film he was the test pilot Burton in the Solaris (1972). Both films competed In Competition at the Cannes Film Festival.

During the time in Moscow he divorced his second wife and he decided to live for his film-career. In spring 1972 he played the role of Alexander Ilyin in Sannikow-Land. In 1974 he played the communist Yaroslav in To the Last Minute and got the State prize of the Ukrainian SSR.

In 1975 he played the main role in the adventure film Captain Nemo based on the Jules Verne novel.

Dvorzhetsky died in 1978 in Gomel, due to acute heart failure.

== Filmography ==
Year	Title	Role	Notes
1971	The Flight	General Khludov	
1971	Return of Saint Bows	Mikhail Karabanov	
1972	Solaris	Henri Burton	
1973	No Time to Wait	Vadim Orlov	
1973	The Sannikov Land	Aleksandr Ilin	
1973	The Sky Is Beyond the Clouds	Sergey Rudnev	
1973	Notches to the memory	Petrya Radukan	
1973	Garden		
1973	Open the Book	Dimitri Lvov	
1974	To the Last Minute	Yaroslav Gayday	(prototype of Yaroslav Halan)
1974	No Return	Nikolay Yakovlevich Nikitin	
1975	Okovani soferi	Valter Holts	
1975	Captain Nemo	Captain Nemo / Nana Sahib	
1975	There, beyond the horizon		
1976	The Miracle of the Holy Antonius	Abbé Chelan	
1977	The legend of Tile	Philipp II	
1978	Julia Vrevskaya	Alexander II	
1978	Encounter on the distant meridian	Nickols Renette	TV Mini-Series
1979	School-mates	Direktor kadetskiy korpusa	

=== Dubbing ===
- Goya or the Hard Way to Enlightenment (1971)
- Nasimi (1973)
