= Farewell, America =

- Russian: Прощай, Америка!
- Directed by: Aleksandr Dovzhenko
- Screenplay by: Aleksandr Dovzhenko
- Based on: The Truth about American Diplomats by Annabelle Bucar
- Starring: Liliya Gritsenko; Nikolai Gritsenko; Grigori Kirillov; Janis Osis; Lyudmila Shagalova; Grigoriy Shpigel
- Production company: Mosfilm
- Release date: 1996
- Running time: 70 minutes
- Country: Soviet Union
- Language: Russian

Farewell, America (Russian: «Прощай, Америка!», Ukrainian: «Прощавай, Америко!») is a 1951 Soviet propaganda drama film directed by Aleksandr Dovzhenko. An adaptation of the book The Truth about American Diplomats by American journalist and defector to the Soviet Union Annabelle Bucar, the film was abruptly shut down halfway through its production at Mosfilm studios. In 1996, the film was restored by the Gosfilmofond state archive before having its first screening at the Berlin Film Festival.

== Plot ==
In 1945, Anna Bedford, a young American journalist from a farming family in Pennsylvania is assigned to work at the U.S. Embassy in the Soviet Union. She arrives in Moscow during the celebrations of the Soviet victory in World War II. While attending the festivities in Red Square, Anna meets Professor Gromov, who invites her to his home. The embassy leadership instructs Anna to use this connection to gather intelligence for the CIA.

A year passes as the postwar period unfolds. A new ambassador, General Walter Scott, arrives at the embassy, bringing a directive that all staff must focus exclusively on intelligence gathering and anti-Soviet activities: "Peace is merely a short interval allowed for preparation for the next war, which will establish the American way of life worldwide."

Anna grows increasingly disillusioned with the embassy's methods. Reports she gathers during her travels to Armenia and Ukraine are distorted to fit propaganda narratives. Amid the lies and suspicion, she finds an ally in Armand Howard, the embassy's information department head, who refuses to compromise the truth. Howard’s integrity leads to his recall to Washington, coinciding with Anna learning of her mother’s death. The two return to the U.S., but Howard faces trial upon arrival. Though acquitted, he is mysteriously murdered in a bar shortly afterward.

Anna is summoned back to Moscow and tasked with writing a fabricated book about oppression in the Soviet Union and falsely claiming Howard’s murder was orchestrated by communists. Instead, Anna defects, causing panic within the embassy.

The uncovered footage ends here, but the script reveals that Anna later becomes a Soviet citizen and publishes an exposé about the activities of American diplomats. She finds a new homeland in the USSR, where she can work and live freely. The planned finale would mirror the iconic scene from Circus, with Anna marching through Red Square among celebratory crowds during a national holiday.

== Cast ==
- Liliya Gritsenko as Anna Bedford
- Nikolai Gritsenko as Armand Howard, head of the information department of the American embassy
- Grigori Kirillov as Walter Scott, American Ambassador in Moscow
- Janis Osis as Charles Winchell, embassy doctor
- Lyudmila Shagalova as Cecilia Wong, embassy doctor
- Grigoriy Shpigel as Journalist
- Aleksandr Smirnov as Hill, reporter
- Elizaveta Alekseeva as Meri Kuper (uncredited)
- Vera Orlova as Anna Bradford's Mother (uncredited)

== Production ==
In February 1948 Anabelle Bucar, an assistant in the USIS office of the U.S. Embassy in Moscow, resigned from her office and sought political asylum in the USSR. Bucar's defection came after she had begun an affair with the actor and operetta singer Konstantin Lapshin; the two later married, and Bucar received an apartment in Moscow. In February 1949 a book written by Bucar, The Truth About American Diplomats, was published in the USSR, receiving widespread publicity. Director Aleksandr Dovzhenko was commissioned to make a film adaptation of it. It is believed that Joseph Stalin personally gave him the order. The film was shot on color film, which at that time was the prerogative of select directors.

In February 1950, speaking before the committee that was accepting the script, Dovzhenko said that he wanted to make a film about Americans, describing them as the "antipodes" of Soviet reality. An acting ensemble was brought in for the shoot, led by Nikolai Gritsenko and his sister Liliya. Dovzhenko told the film's leading actor Vyacheslav Gostinsky (who was better known for playing small roles) that after the film's release he would wake up famous. Politseymako, Ushakova, and Popov also auditioned for the film, but their materials did not make it into the famous editorial board of the film.

The unfinished project would become Dovzhenko's last film. Afterwards, he did not film anything until his death, instead concentrating on literary work and script preparation. According to several film historians, the suspension of filming broke the director morally and had a detrimental effect on his health. In 1956, Dovzhenko died of a heart attack. The film's main character, Annabella Bucar, remained with her new family in Moscow and worked as a radio announcer. She lived to be 83 years old and died in 1998.

== Restoration ==
The film footage lay in the Mosfilm archive for eight years, and in September 1958 was transferred to the USSR State Film Fund for safekeeping.

In 1995, on the initiative of Vladimir Dmitriev, First Deputy General Director of the State Film Fund, a decision was made to restore the film. At first, restorers wanted to restore only the technical archival copy for safety. Then, a decision was made to create a complete work from the disparate fragments, as much as possible, with a specialist commentary between the parts. As Dmitriev recalled, this decision had opponents, primarily because the film was unfinished, not typical of Dovzhenko's style, and openly politically biased. Annabelle Bucar called Dmitriev and spoke out against the premiere.

By this time, the negative of the film had been lost and it was restored from the positive. The soundtrack was preserved almost completely, although one fragment was dubbed by modern actors. The restored version of the film with commentary by Rostislav Yurenev was first shown at the Cinema Center on January 12, 1996. The world premiere took place at the Berlin International Film Festival in the "Panorama" program. In 2006, it was released on DVD in a special edition of 10 discs, prepared by the Alexander Dovzhenko National Center.

== Criticism and evaluation ==
Dovzhenko, who is regarded as creating several classic Soviet movies, took on a topic that was completely alien to him by shooting a political film. Attempts to follow ideological instructions and censorship requirements, multiple rewrites of the script yielded nothing and broke the director.

Characteristic of Soviet cinema of that era was the depiction of the United States as an ideological enemy during the beginning of the arms race and the Cold War. At that time, a number of anti-American films were shot, such as Silver Dust, Meeting on the Elbe, Conspiracy of the Doomed. The story described in the script can be called stereotypical. Discussing Farewell, America, Jonathan Rosenbaum wrote that if the film "were less campy and more accomplished as entertainment, Farewell America might qualify as a sort of anti-Ninotchka, the reverse of Lubistch’s anticommunist comedy with Greta Garbo."

There have been various theories about the reasons for the film's discontinuation. There is a version that the propaganda element of the event lost its meaning. Yuri Lyubimov, whose worldview and actions were greatly influenced by the biography of Anabella Bukar, even before the Decree on the deprivation of his citizenship and forced emigration from the USSR, in his recorded memoirs of the 1960s said that Stalin, allegedly, having looked through the list of films in production in 1951, remarked: "If she [Bukar] betrayed her homeland, then she can betray the new one too," and crossed the film out of the plans. Film scholar Oleg Kovalov believes that the director "went too far" by showing an absurd image of American imperialism. Bella Yezerskaya called the film a caricature of America, where there is not even a shadow of plausibility. In fact, this is no longer satire, but a lampoon of American society: the embassy workers are portrayed as complete idiots, cynics and drunks.

According to Eduard Khrutsky, by closing the film, Stalin saved Dovzhenko from disgrace. Grigory Kozintsev, who familiarized himself with the working materials, found positive aspects in them: "I saw the materials of Dovzhenko's film about America. It was the work of a genius. […] He did an incredible thing - he made people speak English in Russian. He said on the set: "I want to hear the obscene rhythm of capital.""
