= The End of Eternity (film) =

- Directed by: Andrei Yermash
- Written by: Budimir Metalnikov; Andrei Yermash
- Starring: Oleg Vavilov; Gediminas Girdvainis
- Cinematography: Naum Ardashnikov
- Edited by: T. Egorycheva
- Music by: Eduard Artemyev
- Production company: Mosfilm
- Release date: 25 January 1987 (Soviet Union)
- Running time: 137 minutes
- Country: Soviet Union
- Language: Russian

The End of Eternity (Russian: Конец Вечности, romanized: Konets Vechnosti) is a 1987 Soviet science fiction film directed by Andrei Yermash based on the eponymous 1955 novel by Isaac Asimov.

== Plot ==
The film tells about the activities of a secret organization called Eternity, which exists outside of time and controls everything on Earth. Representatives of Eternity can get into any century of the Earth's history, beginning with the 27th century, when Eternity appeared, with the help of Time Capsules moving in the endlessly continuing Sockets of Time, and change the course of events as they themselves deem necessary: eradicating wars, customs, new weapons, space travel. Eternity recruits their new members from the population of normal "time people", taking them in childhood. They are forbidden to maintain any connection with their home in their native century. After training, they become Eternal — Observers, Computers, Sociologists, Technicians.... In that way Andrew Harlan comes to arrive in Eternity, who, after training, worked as an Observer in the 48th century. The young talented Observer is brought by the chairman of the Council of Time Senior Computer Laban Twisel to his home and makes him his personal Technician, a man who chooses the way to change reality that the almighty Computers have decided to change. He is going to entrust Andrew with a responsible assignment during which Harlan should train a student named Cooper with knowledge of the Primitive History (that is, the history of the Earth before the Eternity), which Harlan has been fascinated with since childhood.

Mistakenly, Technician Harlan introduces Cooper to the Time Capsule device, which is strictly forbidden, for which he receives the punishment of being appointed Observer to the Eternity sector of the 48th century in which his nemesis, Computer Finge, is in charge. There, he meets a regular girl from the 48th century, Noÿs Lambent, who temporarily works for Finge as a secretary (this is extremely surprising for Harlan, since there are no women in Eternity). The love of Eternal and Mortal violates all plans of the Computer Twissell, who planned to close the circle of Time: to send Cooper's student in the 24th century in which he should, under the name of the great scientist Vikkor Mullanson, whom Eternity considered its founder, open the temporal field and create the first device to allow one to travel in Time, which will create Eternity in the 27th century. Tes plan matured in Twissell because he found in the archives of Eternity the so-called "memoir of Mullanson" in which he describes his training in Eternity, sends it to the reality of the 24th century, and mentions the names of Twissel and Harlan.

When Computer Finge decides to change the reality of the 48th century, which is Noÿs's, Harlan asks the familiar Sociologist Voy to compute whether she is in a new reality. Learning that she is not there, he hides Noÿs in the Hidden Centuries, which are located after the 1000th from which there is no way out of the Eternity sectors into the Reality. When the change occurs, Harlan can not get to his beloved since the Time Capsule stops in the 1000th century.

Henceforth, Andrew Harlan, Eternal to the bone, becomes an irreconcilable enemy of the Eternity and is ready to do anything to return his beloved girl and even destroy Eternity itself.

== Cast ==
- Oleg Vavilov — Andrew Harlan
- Gediminas Girdvainis — Cooper
- Georgiy Zhzhonov — Senior Calculator Laban Twissell
- Vera Sotnikova — Noÿs Lambent
- Boris Ivanov — Sennor Calculator
- Boris Klyuyev — Sociologist Voy
- Mikk Mikiver — Mentor (Rector of the School of Eternity) Yarrow
- Sergei Yursky — Computer Hobbe Finge
- Vladimir Fyodorov — dwarf

== Production ==
The filming of one of the scenes in which Harlan arrives in the 20th century took place in the same location as the one in which the 1979 film Stalker was shot: in Estonia, 25 km from Tallinn, on the Jägala River, in the area of a destroyed power station.
