= Wings (1966 film) =

- Theatrical release poster
- Directed by: Larisa Shepitko
- Written by: Valentin Yezhov; Natalya Ryazantseva
- Produced by: V. Maslov
- Starring: Maya Bulgakova; Zhanna Bolotova
- Cinematography: Igor Slabnevich
- Edited by: L. Lysenkova
- Music by: Roman Ledenyov
- Production company: Mosfilm
- Release date: 10 November 1966
- Running time: 81 minutes
- Country: Soviet Union
- Language: Russian

Wings (Russian: Крылья, tr. Kryl'ya) is a 1966 Soviet black and white drama film directed by Soviet filmmaker Larisa Shepitko, her first feature film made after graduating from the All-Russian State Institute for Cinematography.

== Plot ==
Forty-one-year-old Nadezhda Petrukhina (Maya Bulgakova), who was a heroic Soviet fighter pilot during World War II, now lives a quiet but unfulfilling ordinary life as the principal of a construction-oriented trade school. Beloved and revered by the generation that experienced the Great Patriotic War, Nadezdha struggles to connect with the generation that followed hers, and to form a closer romantic connection to her boyfriend Pavel, a museum director. Nadezhda disapproves of her adopted daughter Tanya's choices in men, and worries that Tanya (Zhanna Bolotova), unaware she is adopted, might discover the truth. Their relationship is tense, understated and ambiguous; when Tanya encourages her mother to quit her job and begin a new life with a husband, Nadezhda responds with a detached lecture on the importance of self-sacrifice and duty to the state, values she held dear during her military service. At the school, however, Nadezhda's students can appreciate neither the sacrifices she made during the war, nor the sacrifices she makes for them now. This tension comes to a head when she expels Bostryakov, a popular student, for shoving a female classmate and impertinence, only to have the entire student body beg for him to be allowed back. When she permits Bostryakov to return, he tells Nadezdha he despises her.

Nadezdha's vivid memories of flight in her Yakovlev Yak-9 fighter plane, tumbling through clouds, are often interspersed with reality and the moments of dull monotony, such as her daily bus commute. A visit to a local museum, where Nadezhda sees a photograph of fellow pilot Mitya (Leonid Dyachkov), who was her lover during World War II, brings back memories of his final flight. Their planes had been flying abreast when Mitya's plane was hit by gunfire. His plane gradually descended into a crash, with Nadezhda unable to intercede, culminating in a last-ditch attempt to cause a visual disturbance in front of Mitya's crippled plane by rolling the wings of her own plane within his field of vision in hopes of jarring him to consciousness, but to no avail. Unsettled by her memories, Nadezdha proposes marriage to Pavel, but a moment later discards the idea, writing it off as "the director marrying one of his exhibits."

Seized by nostalgia, Nadezhda goes to the military airfield to visit her friend Konstantin, a flight instructor. While there, she climbs aboard a Yakovlev Yak-18 PM training plane and experiences a flush of emotions as she examines the instrument panel. Konstantin arrives, and he and his students playfully push the plane through the field with Nadezhda sitting in it.

Nadezhda's happiness turns to apprehension as the aircraft nears the entrance to the hangar. At the last moment, Nadezhda starts the engine, wheels the aircraft around, and taxies out to the runway, with the astonished Konstantin and students running after her. Lifting off, she repeats the final maneuvers she had performed in her aircraft when she tried to bring Mitya back to consciousness in the last moments of their final flight together so many years ago.

== Cast ==
- Maya Bulgakova as Nadezhda "Nadya" Petrukhina
- Zhanna Bolotova as Tanya
- Panteleimon Krymov as Pavel Gavrilovich
- Leonid Dyachkov as Dmitry "Mitya" Grachov
- Vladimir Gorelov as Igor
- Yury Medvedev as Boris Grigoryevich
- Nikolay Grabbe as Konstantin "Kostya" Shuvalov
- Zhanna Aleksandrova as Zina Yermolaeva
- Sergei Nikonenko as Sergei Bostryakov
- Rimma Markova as Alexandra "Shura" Ivanova
- Arkady Trusov as Morozov
- Olga Gobzeva as Journalist

Party Guests

- Yevgeniy Yevstigneyev as Misha
- Igor Kashintsev as Andrei
- Vitaly Vulf as Party Guest
- Valery Zalivin as Party Guest

Minor Characters

- Vladimir Burmistrov as Cadet
- Natalya Gitserot as School Secretary Natalya Maksimilyanovna
- Pavel Gurov as Tailor
- Pyotr Dolzhanov as Vladimir Danilovich
- Maria Kravchunovskaya as Bystryakov's Neighbor
- Boris Yurchenko as Sinitsin
- Alevtina Rumyantseva as Museum Tour Guide (voiced by Maria Vinogradova)
- Lev Vainshtein as Council Member
- Ivan Turchenko as Council Member
- Dmitry Nikolayev as Boy Next Door

== Production ==
Integration of wartime Messerschmitt Bf 109 combat footage with live-action footage of Yakovlev Yak-9 fighter aircraft were used in a dream sequence.

== Release ==
Wings was released on DVD by The Criterion Collection in 2008 through its Eclipse series as part of a box set together with The Ascent.

== Reception ==
Film critic Paul Schrader, as well as director Ben Wheatley, chose Wings as one of their top 10 favorite Criterion releases. Critic Jonathan Rosenbaum has called it a "lovely and nuanced character study," an analysis repeated by critic Michael Koresky's description of the film as a "penetrating character study."

Critic David Sterritt wrote that it is "a remarkable movie, especially for a directorial debut," while another critic, Dave Kehr, wrote that Shepitko learned from Alexander Dovzhenko how "to bend documentary style realism to more subjective, poetic ends". Similarly, Senses of Cinema praised the film's "rich layers of meaning,"

DVD Verdict wrote that the "most astonishing thing about Wings is how young Shepitko was when she directed it. It feels like the work of an older director, one who would understand what it's like to live in the shadow of your younger self" and that much of the film's "success leans on the performance of Bulgakova, and she does deliver a phenomenal performance. On a whole, the film doesn't stand out in terms of its storytelling or cinematography, but as a sensitive human portrait, it truly is remarkable," and critic Dennis Schwartz called it a "brilliantly conceived work of art." In Sight & Sound's 2012 surveys of the greatest films ever made, two critics (Sergio Grmek Germani and Erica Gregor) and two directors (Carol Morley and Vlado Škafar) voted for Wings.

== See also ==
- 586th Fighter Aviation Regiment, which appears to have been Nadezhda's unit (the only female aviation unit to fly Yakovlev fighters)
- Soviet women in World War II
