= The Silence of Dr. Evans =

- Russian poster
- Russian: Молчание доктора Ивенса
- Directed by: Budimir Metalnikov
- Written by: Budimir Metalnikov
- Starring: Sergey Bondarchuk; Zhanna Bolotova; Irina Skobtseva; Leonid Obolensky; Ivan Kuznetsov
- Cinematography: Vladimir Bondarev; Yuri Sokol
- Edited by: Roza Rogatkina
- Music by: Eduard Artemyev
- Production company: Mosfilm
- Release date: 1973
- Running time: 77 min.
- Country: Soviet Union
- Language: Russian

The Silence of Dr. Evans (Russian: Молчание доктора Ивенса, romanized: Molchaniye doktora Ivensa) is a 1973 Soviet science fiction film directed by Budimir Metalnikov.

One plane crashes over the Atlantic, but several passengers survived, including the famous scientist Martin Evans, working to extend the life of a person. He becomes the chosen one of the aliens who came into contact with earthlings.

== Plot ==
After a catastrophic plane crash over the Atlantic, survivors, including Dr. Martin Evans, are rescued by aliens from the planet Oraina. The aliens erase the passengers’ memories of the crash and place them in a semi-ruined plane in an unknown dimension, where they feel they are being observed. When the aliens finally reveal themselves, they explain their mission: to explore other civilizations after experiencing profound loneliness on their ancient planet. Dr. Evans, chosen for his intellect, learns about their advanced abilities in telepathy, teleportation, and longevity. Though the aliens are benevolent, they remain emotionally reserved and critical of Earth's flaws. A tragic incident involving human hostility leads to the death of an alien, and after observing Earth’s wars, diseases, and disunity, the aliens decide humanity is not ready for the secrets of extended life. They erase the passengers’ memories, sparing only Evans, who promises to keep their encounter a secret.

The passengers are found on an Atlantic island by rescue teams and become the subject of widespread media attention. Evans, haunted by the encounter, struggles with the ethical implications of his research into prolonging life. Alien crew member Orainte, moved by Evans' sincerity, defies her people to remain on Earth and secretly visits him. As Evans faces surveillance from government agents, he ultimately decides to reveal the truth. However, their pursuit ends in tragedy: Evans dies in a car crash, and Orainte is fatally shot while defending him, her body vanishing without explanation. The aliens leave Earth, disappointed by humanity’s readiness for contact. The media portrays Evans as a delusional scientist who died in an accident, while the mystery of the aliens remains unsolved, leaving humanity to ponder the vastness of the universe and its own moral shortcomings.

== Cast ==
- Sergey Bondarchuk as Dr. Martin Evans
- Zhanna Bolotova as Orante
- Irina Skobtseva as Mrs. Evelin Evans
- Leonid Obolensky as Zor
- Ivan Kuznetsov as Rin
- Boris Romanov as Buami
- Olgert Kroders as Grass
- Gunars Placens as Bem
- Pranas Piaulokas as Latski
- Valeri Khlevinsky as Fazenda
