= Gorny Balykley =

Gorny Balykley Горный Балыклей
- Selo
- Location within Volgograd Oblast Location within Russia
- Coordinates: 49°33′N 45°03′E
- Country: Russia
- Region: Volgograd Oblast
- District: Dubovsky District
- Time zone: UTC+4:00

Gorny Balykley (Russian: Го́рный Балыкле́й) is a rural locality (a selo) and the administrative center of Gornobalykleyskoye Rural Settlement, Dubovsky District, Volgograd Oblast, Russia. The population was 2,656 as of 2010. There are 61 streets.

== Geography ==
Gorny Balykley is located in steppe, on the west bank of the Volgograd Reservoir, 76 km north of Dubovka (the district's administrative centre) by road. Suvodskaya is the nearest rural locality.
