= Ivars Kalniņš =

Latvian actor

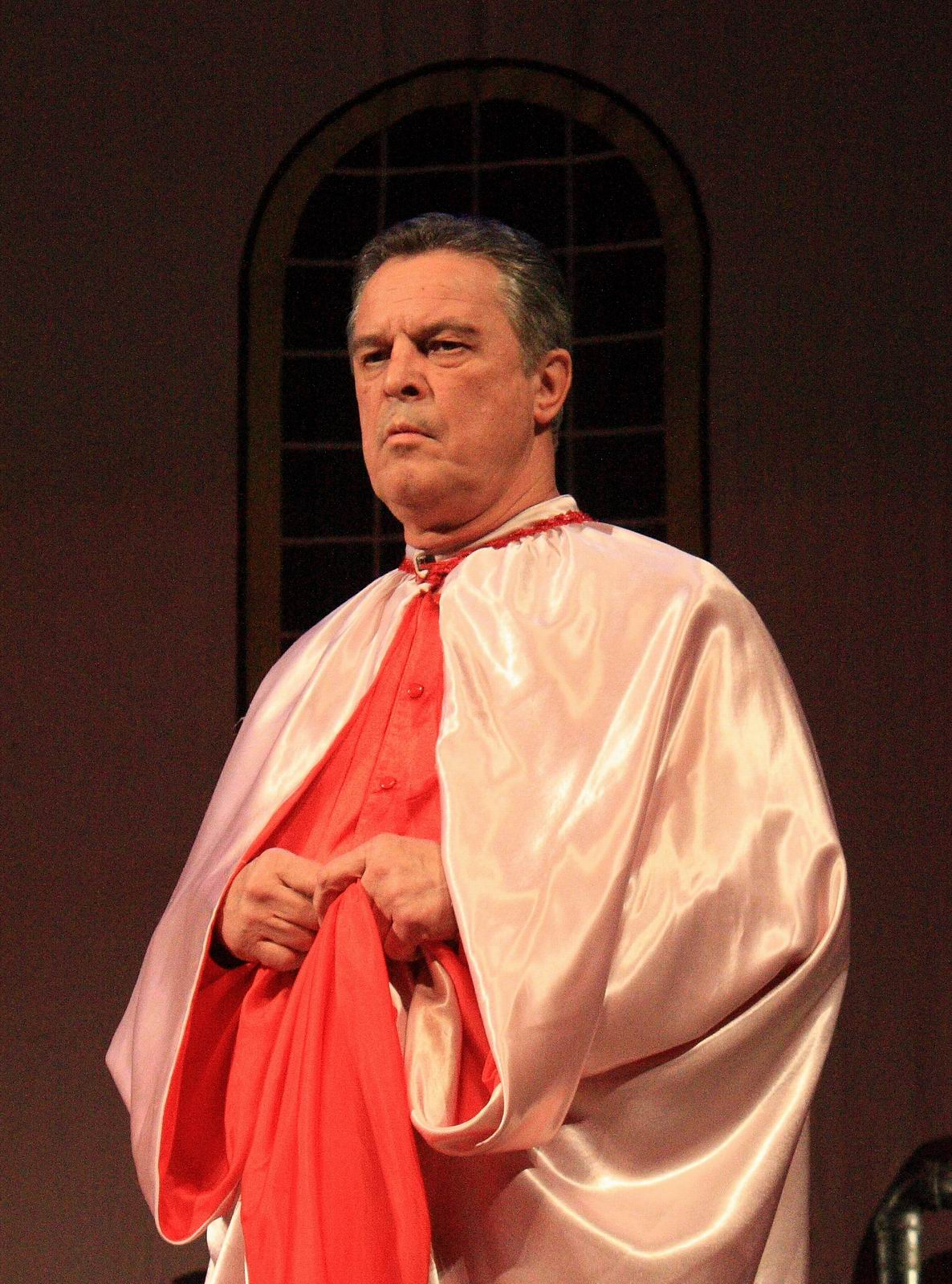
- Born: Ivars Edmunds Kalniņš; 1 August 1948 (age 77); Riga, Latvian SSR (now Latvia)
- Occupation: actor
- Years active: 1972–present
- Spouse: Laura Kalniņa

Ivars Edmunds Kalniņš (born 1 August 1948) is a Latvian film and television actor. He graduated in 1974 from the Jāzeps Vītols Theatre Department of the Latvian Conservatory. He had already started acting however in 1972 at the Artistic Academic Theatre of J. Rainis. Kalniņš has performed in both Latvian language and Russian language films and television shows.

== Selected filmography ==
- Apple in the River (1974)
- Theatre (1978)
- Little Tragedies (1979)
- Early Rust (1979)
- Unfinished Supper (1979)
- The Fairfax Millions (1980)
- Do Not Shoot at White Swans (1980)
- Dusha (1982)
- Incident at Map Grid 36-80 (1982)
- TASS Is Authorized to Declare... (1984)
- The Winter Cherry (1985)
- The Dolphin's Cry (1986)
- Entrance to the Labyrinth (1989)
- Frenzied Bus (1990)
- Mirror Wars (2005)
- Imp in the Rib, or the Magnificent Four (2006)
