= Nikolai Gritsenko =

Soviet actor (1912–1979)

- Николай Гриценко
- Born: July 24 1912 [O.S. July 11] Yasynuvata, Russian Empire (present-day Ukraine)
- Died: December 8, 1979 (aged 67); Moscow, Russian SFSR, Soviet Union
- Other name: Mykola Hrytsenko
- Occupation: Actor
- Years active: 1937–1979

Nikolai Olimpievich Gritsenko (Note: Russian: Николай Олимпиевич Гриценко, romanized: Nikolay Olimpiyevich Gritsenko) or Mykola Olimpiiovych Hrytsenko (Note: Ukrainian: Микола Олімпійович Гриценко, romanized: Mykola Olimpiiovych Hrytsenko) (July 24 1912 [O.S. July 11] – December 8, 1979) was a Soviet theater and film actor. He appeared in more than 30 films between 1942 and 1978. Gritsenko also was a member of the Vakhtangov Theatre company in Moscow. There he was designated Honored Artist of the RSFSR and People's Artist of the USSR. He died on 8 December 1979 after a "conflict" with patients at a hospital he was staying in, and was buried in the Novodevichy Cemetery in Moscow.

== Partial filmography ==
- Mashenka (1942) – Kolya
- Old Vaudeville (1946) – Lt. Anton Petrovich Fadeev
- Farewell, America (1949)
- Dream of a Cossack (1951) – Artamashov
- The Night Before Christmas (1951) – Vakula (voice)
- Hostile Whirlwinds (1953) – Schreder
- Marina's Destiny (1953) – Terenty
- The Safety Match (1954) – Psekov, estate manager
- A Big Family (1954) – club manager
- The Road (1955) – Ivan Alekseevich
- The Sisters (1957)
- The Eighteenth Year (1958)
- Gloomy Morning (1959) – Vadim Roshchin
- Wind of Freedom (1961) – Georg Stan
- Barrier of the Unknown (1962) – Vadim Lagin
- Ponedelnik: den tyazhyolyy (1964) – Kuzma Yegorovich Stryapkov
- Russian Forest (1964) – Aleksandr Gratsiyansky
- Mother and Stepmother (1964) – Fedor Zhurbenko
- Man without a Passport (1966) – Pyotr Izmaylov
- Two Years over the Abyss (1966) – Colonel Miller
- The Places Here are Quiet (1967) – Saveliy Petrovich Fisyuk
- Anna Karenina (1967) – Karenin
- There Lived a Man (1968)
- A Little Crane (1969) – Markelov
- Razvyazka (1969) – Terekhov
- The Adjutant of His Excellency (1970, TV Series) – Vikentiy Pavlovich Speransky
- Family Happiness (1970) – Vaksin
- I, Francisk Skaryna... (1970) – Reichenberg
- Schastye Anny (1971) – Prokhor Lychkov
- Veseli Zhabokrychi (1971) – Vasil Mironovich
- The Land of Sannikov (1973) - Trifon Stepanovich Perfilyev, gold mines
- The Black Prince (1973) – Ananiy Mytnikov
- Seventeen Moments of Spring (1973, TV Mini-Series) – general in the train
- The Land of Sannikov (1973) – Trifon Perfilyev
- A Man in Civilian Clothes (1973) – baron Erich von Ostenfelzen
- Doker (1973)
- Time of Her Sons (1974) – Anton Trofimovich Gulyayev
- Crime (1976) – Pyotr Yegorovich
- Stazhyor (1976) – Aleksandr Trofimov
- Enemies (1978) – General Pechenegov
- Exile No. 011 (1978) – Varlamtsev
- Father Sergius (1979) – General Korotkov
- Rebel Barricade (1979)

== Awards ==
- Stanislavsky State Prize of the RSFSR
