= Lionella Pyryeva =

Soviet and Russian actress

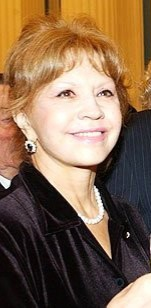
Image of Lionella Pyryeva

Lionella Pyryeva (15 March 1938 in Odesa, Ukraine; birth name Skirda and present name Strizhenova) is a retired Soviet actress. She is known for her roles in The Brothers Karamazov (1969), in the role of Grushenka, Wind of Freedom (1961) and The Light of a Distant Star (1964). In 1991, she was awarded the Honored Artist of the RSFSR award.

She initially married the famous Soviet film director and screenwriter Ivan Pyryev, more than 36 years her senior. After Pyerev had died, she married Oleg Strizhenov, a fellow film and stage actor, in 1976.
