= Alexey Borzunov =

Soviet/Russian actor

- Born: Alexey Alexeyevich Borzunov; November 11, 1943; Moscow, Soviet Union
- Died: June 7, 2013 (aged 69); Moscow, Russia
- Education: Moscow Art Theatre School
- Occupation: Actor
- Years active: 1959—2013

Alexey Alexeyevich Borzunov (Russian: Алексе́й Алексе́евич Борзуно́в; 1943–2013) was a Soviet and Russian stage, film and voice actor. Merited Artist of the Russian Federation (2005).

== Biography ==
The boy's parents, due to financial reasons sent him to an orphanage, but later he was taken away by his grandmother, who brought the boy up.

For the first time, he appeared in the cinema as a schoolboy in 1959, in the film The Unusual Journey of Mishka Strekachev.

In 1965 he graduated from the Moscow Art Theatre School (the course of V.P. Markov) and was accepted by the theater troupe. In 1965-1990 he was the actor of this theater. In 1987 he moved to the Moscow Art Theatre. He played Lariosik in the play "The Days of the Turbins" and many other roles. He acted in films, but became known for his numerous works in dubbing and film soundtracks. The actor's voice is not only the famous voice of Disney cartoons. In addition to Scrooge McDuck, his voice was spoken in Russia by the first Brazilian telenovelas characters, when they first came to the Russian screen. He voiced the Luis Alberto Salvatierra in the famous Mexican television series Los ricos también lloran, Adolfo and all the male roles from the series Farmacia de guardia.

Among his last works were films such as Indiana Jones and the Kingdom of the Crystal Skull (2008), Harry Potter and the Half-Blood Prince (2009), Star Trek (2009), Inception (2010) and The Hobbit: An Unexpected Journey (2012).

He worked a lot as a performer of audiobooks, among which: «Белая гвардия», «Маленький принц», «Остров сокровищ» (radio show), «Евангелие Господа и Бога и Спаса нашего Иисуса Христа» and «Война миров» (radio show). He participated in radio plays and radio staging, read offscreen text on the Animal Planet TV channel.

He was honored an unofficial title of "dubbing king” by his fans and admirers for his ability to sound the voices of male and female characters and brilliantly get used to the role. He created 220 works of dubbing and 23 works on voice acting and played 16 roles in the cinema. For many years he collaborated with Radio Yunost, worked on the production of a radio program set. From 1990s to 2010s he was a news presenter on a number of Russian TV channels, among them - ORT, M1 and "Подмосковье". He often voiced commercial ads.

His daughter Elena Borzunova (born in 1970) is also a voice actress. In 1988, she played the role of secretary of the Prosecutor's Office Masha Gvozdikina in Criminal Talent and Lieutenant Popova of Stalin's guard in The Inner Circle.

He died on 7 June 2013 of a heart attack in his apartment. His funeral service was held at the Central clinic hospital of Administration of the President of the Russian Federation.

He is buried at Khovanskoye Cemetery.

== Awards ==
- Merited Artist of the Russian Federation (2005).

== Selected works ==
Cinema actor:

- My Friend, Kolka! (1961) as Yura Ustinov
- Practical Joke (1977) as lieutenant Malyshev

Voice actor:

- Dumbo — director of the circus
- The Adventures of Ichabod and Mr. Toad — Angus MacBadger
- Cinderella — King
- Alice in Wonderland — Doorknob, The Carpenter, Mother Oyster
- The Aristocats — Cook
- Robin Hood — Prince John
- The Lord of the Rings — Legolas
