= The Light of a Distant Star =

- Russian poster
- Russian: Свет далёкой звезды
- Directed by: Ivan Pyryev
- Written by: Aleksandr Chakovskiy; Ivan Pyryev
- Starring: Lionella Pyryeva; Nikolai Alekseyev; Aleksey Batalov; Vladimir Korenev; Vera Mayorova
- Cinematography: Nikolay Olonovskiy
- Music by: Andrei Petrov
- Release date: 1964
- Country: Soviet Union
- Language: Russian

The Light of a Distant Star (Russian: Свет далёкой звезды) is a 1964 Soviet romance film directed by Ivan Pyryev.

The film is about lovers who are separated by war. Some time after the end of the war, the main character goes to look for his girlfriend after seeing her photo in a single magazine.

== Plot ==
In the autumn of 1941, during the first year of the Great Patriotic War, the pier in Gorky (now Nizhny Novgorod) was crowded with people desperately trying to board steamships heading to the rear. Amid this chaos, Olya Mironova and Volodya Zavyalov, a cadet of a flight school, met briefly but were forced to part ways.

Their paths crossed again when Olya, now serving as an armament mechanic in an aviation regiment, encountered Zavyalov, who landed at her airfield in a combat plane. Their reunion was brief, as shortly afterward, Olya learned that Zavyalov's plane had been shot down in an aerial battle. Unbeknownst to her, Zavyalov had survived. Meanwhile, Zavyalov later discovered that Olya’s plane, on which she served as an air gunner, had failed to return from a combat mission.

Fifteen years later, Zavyalov stumbled upon a magazine featuring a photograph of Olya. As he searched for her, he uncovered the story of her life after their last encounter, ultimately learning that she had perished during a laboratory explosion.

== Cast ==
- Lionella Pyryeva as Olga Mironova (as L. Pyryeva)
- Nikolai Alekseyev as Vladimir Zavyalov
- Aleksey Batalov as Lukashov
- Vladimir Korenev as Viktor - Zavyalov's nephew
- Vera Mayorova as Liza
- Sofiya Pilyavskaya as Xenia Petrovna
- Andrei Abrikosov as General Osokin
- Olga Vikladt as Nina Pavlovna (as Olga Vikland)
- Aleftina Konstantinova as Valya (as Alevtina Konstantinova)
- Yevgeny Vesnik as Colonel
