= Krachai =

Legendary Chukchi chief

A legend prevalent among the Chukchi people of Siberia tells of a chief Krachai (or Krächoj, Krahay, Khrakhai), who fled with his people (the Krachaians or Krahays, also identified as the Onkilon or Omoki–Siberian Yupik people) across the ice to settle in a northern land. Though the story may be mythical, the existence of an island or continent to the north was lent credence to by the annual migration of reindeer across the ice. As well as the appearance of slate spear-points washed up on Arctic shores, made in a fashion unknown to the Chukchi. Linguist Michael E. Krauss has recently presented archaeological, historical, and linguistic evidence that Wrangel Island was a way station on a trade route linking the Inuit settlement at Point Hope, Alaska with the north Siberian coast, and that the coast may have been colonized in late prehistoric and early historic times by Inuit settlers from North America. Krauss suggests that the departure of these colonists was related to the Krachai legend.
