= Kirill Orlovsky =

Belarusian Soviet partisan commander, intelligence officer, and farmer (1895–1968)

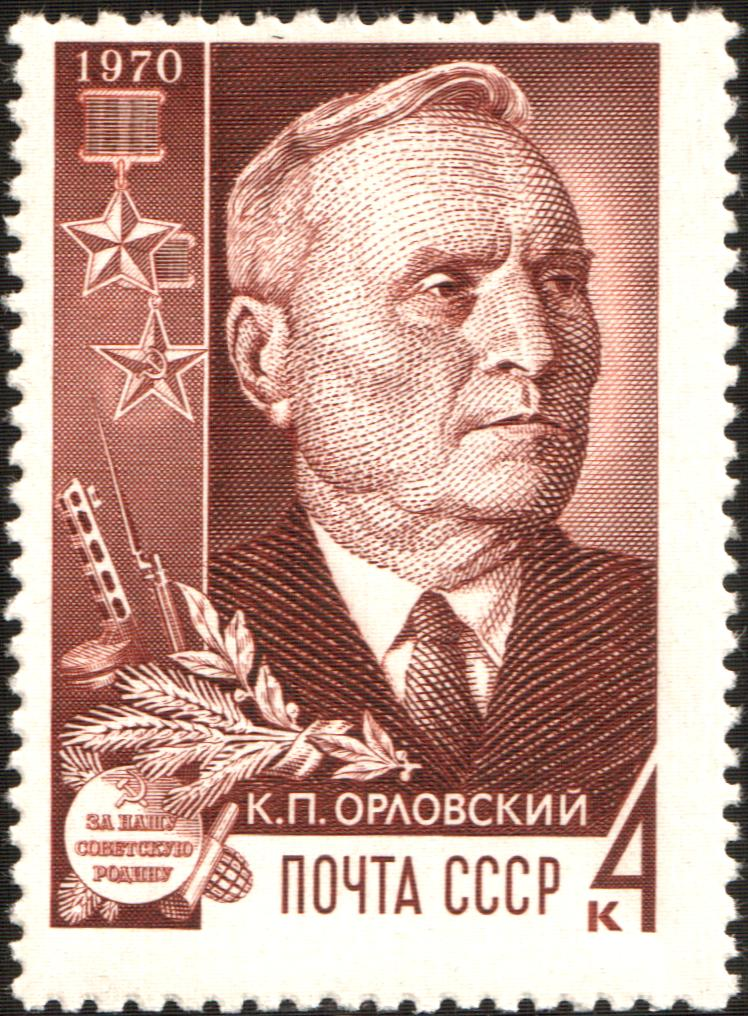
- Kirill Orlovsky on a 1970 Soviet stamp
- Native name: Кірыл Пракопавіч Арлоўскі
- Born: 30 January 1895; Myshkovichi, Bobruysky Uyezd, Minsk Governorate, Russian Empire
- Died: 13 January 1968 (aged 72) Kirawsk District, Mogilev Region, Byelorussian SSR, Soviet Union
- Allegiance: Russian Empire; Russian SFSR; Soviet Union
- Branch: Imperial Russian Army; Red Army; NKVD
- Service years: 1915–1944
- Rank: Podpolkovnik
- Conflicts: World War I; Polish–Soviet War; Spanish Civil War; World War II
- Awards: Hero of the Soviet Union; Hero of Socialist Labour; Order of Lenin (5); Order of the Red Banner; Order of the Red Star

Kirill Prokofyevich Orlovsky (Note: Belarusian: Кірыл Пракопавіч Арлоўскі, romanized: Kiryl Prakopavich Arlouski; Russian: Кири́лл Проко́фьевич Орло́вский) (30 January [O.S. 10 January] 1895 – 13 January 1968) was a Soviet partisan commander, a functionary of the Soviet state security agencies (Cheka-GPU-NKVD), and the chairman of a major kolkhoz. He was a recipient of the Hero of the Soviet Union award for courage during fighting the Nazi occupation behind enemy lines.

== Early life and career ==
Kirill Prokofyevich Orlovsky was born in the village of Myshkovichi, Minsk Governorate, Russian Empire, into a family of Belarusian peasants on 30 January [O.S. 10 January] 1895. In 1906, he entered the Popovshchina parochial school, graduating in 1910.

=== World War I ===
In 1915, he was drafted into the Imperial Russian Army, first serving as a private in the 251st Reserve Infantry Regiment and from 1917, as a non-commissioned officer in the 65th Siberian Rifle Regiment, commanding a sapper platoon, seeing action at the Eastern Front (for the Russian Empire, it was the Western Front) of World War I.

In January 1918, he was demobilized, returning to his native village.

He then worked in the NKVD of the Byelorussian SSR and trained partisan detachments.

In 1936 worked as the head of the GULAG section on the construction of the Moscow-Volga canal. In 1937-1938 he commanded combat missions during the Spanish Civil War, where he fought in the rear of the Nationalist troops as commander of sabotage and guerrilla groups.

== In World War II ==
In 1941, he was sent a special mission in Western China, from where, at his personal request, he was recalled and sent to the deep rear of the German invaders as the commander of a reconnaissance and sabotage group. He was reinstated in the service in the organs and became a member of the Special Group of the NKVD, headed by Pavel Sudoplatov.

On 17 and 18 February 1943, a 12 man detachment under the command of Orlovsky attacked the convoy of the General Commissioner of Belarus Wilhelm Kube on one of the roads. As a result of the raid, Hauptcommissar Friedrich Fenz, SS-Obergruppenführer Zacharius, as well as 10 officers and more than 30 soldiers were killed.

Orlovsky's detachment did not suffer losses, but Orlovsky himself was seriously wounded. His right arm was amputated along the shoulder with an ordinary saw without anesthesia, four fingers on the left, and the auditory nerve was damaged by 50-60%. In August he was recalled to Moscow.

== Post-war service ==
After his injuries he wrote a letter to Soviet authorities and asked for giving services in non-military fields. Further in the letter, he asked to be allowed to head a collective farm in his native village. Orlovsky's request was satisfied by the Soviet government. He received a recommendation and in January 1945 was elected chairman of the collective farm "Rassvet" of the Kirov district of the Mogilev region.

From 1956 to 1961 he was a candidate member of the CPSU Central Committee.

He died on 13 January 1968. He was buried in the village of Myshkovichi.
