= Yuri Nagibin =

Russian author (1920–1994)

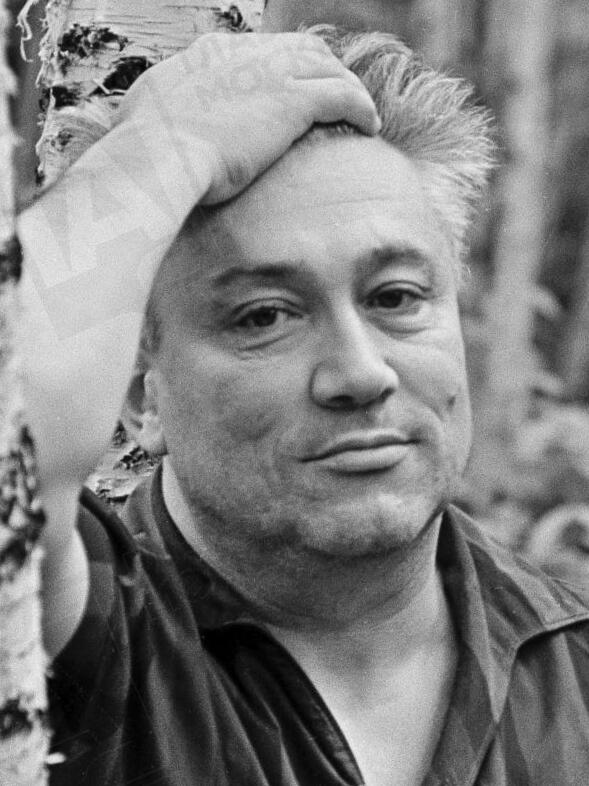
- Nagibin in the 1960s
- Native name: Юрий Нагибин
- Born: Yuri Markovich Nagibin; 3 April 1920 Moscow, Russian SFSR
- Died: 17 June 1994 (aged 74) Moscow, Russia
- Resting place: Novodevichy Cemetery
- Occupation: Short story writer; screenwriter; literary critic; novelist

Yuri Markovich Nagibin (Russian: Юрий Маркович Нагибин; 3 April 1920 – 17 June 1994) was a Soviet and Russian short story writer, screenwriter, literary critic and novelist.

== Biography ==
Yuri Nagibin was born in Moscow. Nagibin's mother Ksenia Nagibina was pregnant with him when his father — Kirill Nagibin, a Russian nobleman — was executed as a counter-revolutionary before he was born. He was raised by his Jewish stepfather Mark Leventhal who was also later arrested and sent into internal exile to the Russian North in Komi Republic in 1927. Nagibin was unaware of his real father, so he assumed he was partly Jewish (Nagibin's mother was of Russian ethnicity). He found out late in life that both of his parents were in fact Russian, but he consciously related himself to Jews and condemned antisemitism, having suffered many antisemitic incidents in his early life.

In 1938 he entered the Moscow State Medical University, but left it for Gerasimov Institute of Cinematography. He wrote his first story in 1940 and soon became a member of the Union of Soviet Writers. World War II terminated his education. In 1942 he joined the Red Army as a political commissar. «My knowledge of German language determined my war specialty. I was sent to the 7th department of the Main Political Directorate of the Soviet Army — which meant counterpropaganda. I served as a counterpropagandist and political instructor, my rank equaled to that of a lieutenant. First the Volkhov Front, the Leningrad Front, then I was sent to the Voronezh Front». After a serious contusion he returned to the front as a war correspondent. In 1943 he published his first collection of stories.

Nagibin was one of the most prolific Soviet screenplay writers, but he also wrote several novels and novellas, as well as many short stories and newspaper articles. Among the topics he explored was the Great Patriotic War, the life of simple people after the war, his childhood memories, village prose, ecological themes and Russian history. He traveled a lot — both inside and outside of the USSR, which also influenced his writings. One of his screenplays was The Red Tent, based on the history of Umberto Nobile's expedition to the North Pole, which was heavily rewritten during the filming process of the film of the same name. He also co-wrote the screenplay for the Soviet-Japanese movie Dersu Uzala directed by Akira Kurosawa which received an Oscar for the Best Foreign Language Film in 1976.

In October 1993, he signed the Letter of Forty-Two.

Nagibin was married six times, yet he left no children. Among his wives was Valentina Likhachyova — daughter of Ivan Likhachev — and acclaimed Soviet poet Bella Akhmadulina. His last wife, Alla Nagibina, remembered: «We met at the party. He was married, and so was I... Moscow didn't welcome me. Nobody could be beside him after Bella. Bella was incredibly talented and beautiful, the star of her time. Nagibin also wasn't an ordinary boy. He was rich as Croesus and beautiful as Alain Delon». Nevertheless, they lived together for 25 years, up till Nagibin's death.

He died in Moscow on 17 June 1994 and was buried at Novodevichy Cemetery.

== Screenplays ==
- Hard Happiness (1958)
- The Slowest Train (1963)
- The Chairman (1964)
- The Girl and the Echo (1964)
- Woman's World (1967)
- Director (1969)
- Tchaikovsky (1969)
- The Red Tent (1969)
- Under en steinhimmel (1974) (co-written with Sigbjørn Hølmebakk)
- Dersu Uzala (1975) (co-written with Akira Kurosawa)
- Jarosław Dąbrowski (1976)
- The Beginning of the Legend (1976)
- Late Meeting (1978)
- Bambi's Childhood (1985)
- Bambi's Youth (1986)
- Gardes-Marines, Ahead! (1988)
- Viva Gardes-Marines! (1991)
- Gardes-Marines III (1992)

== English translations ==
- Newlywed, from Such a Simple Thing and Other Stories, FLPH, Moscow, 1959. from Archive.org
- Island of Love, Progress Publishers, 1977.
- The Peak of Success and Other Stories, Ardis, 1986.
- Arise and Walk, Faber and Faber, 1991.
