= Nina Sazonova =

Russian actor (1917–2004)

- Нина Сазонова
- Born: Nina Afanasievna Sazonova; 7 January 1917; Konstantinovo, Alexandrovsky Uyezd, Vladimir Governorate, Russian Empire
- Died: 1 March 2004 (aged 87); Moscow, Russia
- Occupation: actress
- Years active: 1934 — 2002

Nina Afanasievna Sazonova (Russian: Ни́на Афана́сьевна Сазо́нова; 1917 — 2004) was a leading actress of the Soviet Army Theatre in Moscow.

The daughter of a peasant, she joined Aleksey Popov's theatre school at the age of 17. Popov went on to direct her in a number of productions at the Soviet Army Theatre. In the 1960s, she appeared in supporting roles in a slew of Soviet films and gained wider renown for her portrayal of a World War II survivor in the 1965 melodrama Womenfolk. Sazonova was named a People's Artist of the USSR in 1977 and was awarded the Order of Lenin in 1987.

Her later years were plagued by a series of horrible incidents, such as being severely beaten by her drunken son who proceeded to jump 11 stories out of an apartment window to his death.

== Selected filmography ==
- A Simple Story (1960)
- Chronicle of Flaming Years (1961)
- There Is Such a Lad (1964)
- Woman's World (1967)
- Zigzag of Success (1968)
- Day by Day (1971–72)
