= Boris Kudryavtsev =

Борис Григорьевич Кудрявцев
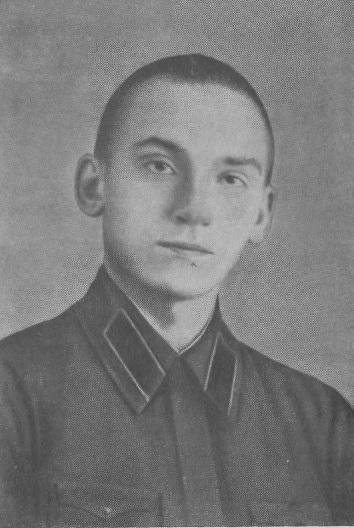
- Born: February 4, 1922; Kursk, Kursk Governorate, RSFSR
- Died: March 25, 1943 (aged 21); Kyzylorda, Kazakh SSR, USSR
- Citizenship: Soviet Union

Boris Grigorievich Kudryavtsev (February 4, 1922, Kursk – March 25, 1943, Kyzylorda) was a Leningrad schoolboy and later an employee of the Institute of Ethnography of the USSR Academy of Sciences, who made a significant contribution to the decipherment of Rongorongo.

== Biography ==
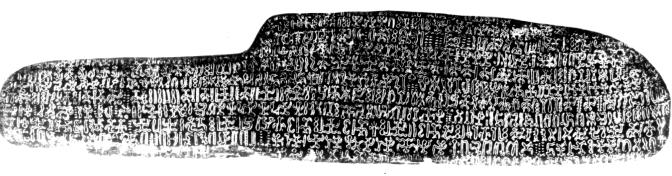
Negative image of the large Rongorongo tablet (P) from the collection of the Kunstkamera, with which B.G. Kudryavtsev worked

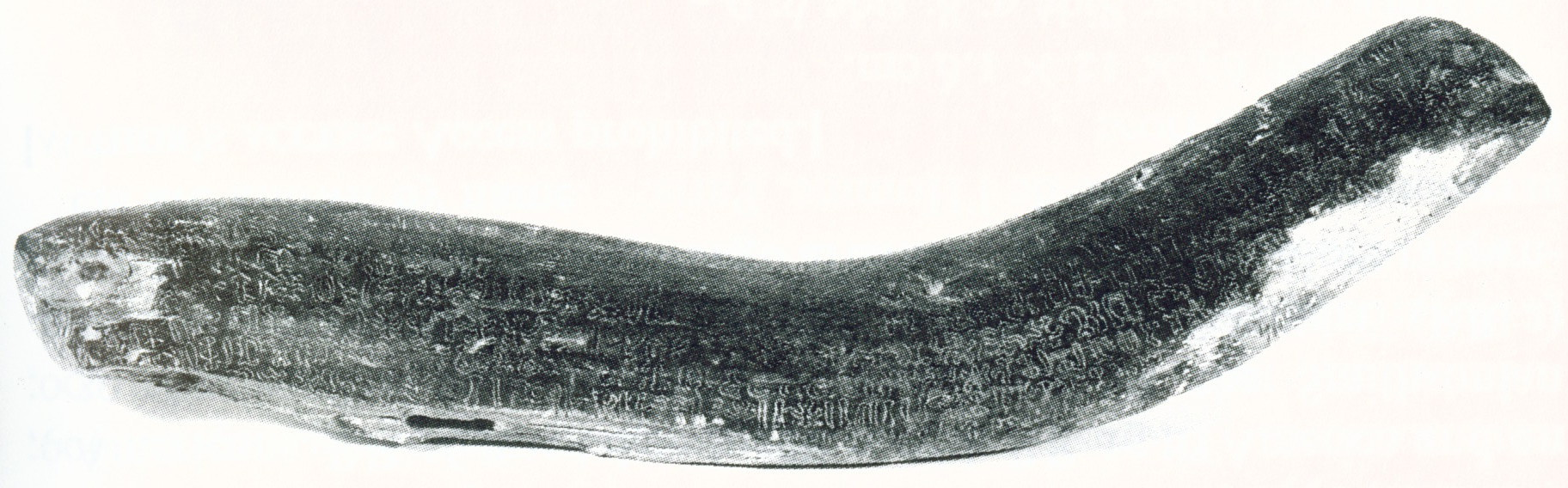
Small Rongorongo tablet (Q) with which B.G. Kudryavtsev worked

Boris Kudryavtsev was born in Kursk and lived in Leningrad from a young age. In 1936, while a student at Secondary School No. 147 (according to another version, 109th School of the Smolninsky District of Leningrad), Boris and his classmates Valery Baitman and Alexander Zhamoyda were "young friends" of the Museum of Anthropology and Ethnography of the USSR Academy of Sciences in Leningrad. They engaged with the Indian collections and studied the Hindi and Urdu languages. In 1938, upon seeing among the Polynesian collection items gifted to the museum by Nikolay Miklukho-Maklai two "kohau rongorongo", Kudryavtsev became interested in the tablets and the writings on them and decided to attempt deciphering them with the participation of Baitman and Zhamoyda. (In some publications, following the fictional story by I. Rakhtanov, Baitman and Zhamoyda are referred to by the pseudonyms "Valery Chernushkov" and "Oleg Klitin"). The schoolboys could work with the Leningrad Rongorongo inscriptions, as well as with photocopies of the Large Chilean Tablet (H) and Tablet A; however, the amount of available research literature was limited.

During the Great Patriotic War, Boris Kudryavtsev was evacuated as a research associate of the Institute of Ethnography of the USSR Academy of Sciences, having been enlisted on July 7, 1942. On December 12, 1942, he was sent to study at the Pedagogical Institute in the city of Kyzylorda. On March 25, 1943, Kudryavtsev drowned in the Syr Darya River during the spring ice drift as a result of an accident. In some publications (including fictional works about Kudryavtsev), it is mistakenly stated that he died on the front.

Boris left his research notes to Professor D.A. Olderogge, and his article "The Writing of Easter Island" was published in 1949 in the Collection of the Museum of Anthropology and Ethnography of the USSR Academy of Sciences.

== Results of Kudryavtsev's group work ==
Interested in the texts of tablets P and Q, stored in the Museum of Anthropology and Ethnography, Kudryavtsev, Baitman, and Zhamoyda found that both tablets contained roughly the same text; the same was found on tablet H (the Large Tablet from Santiago de Chile).

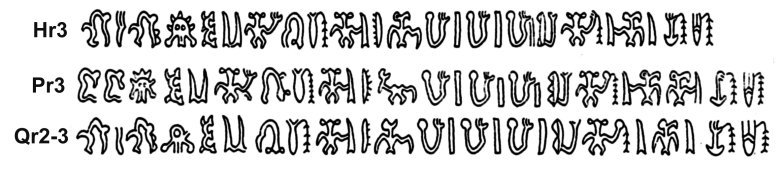

Kudryavtsev later noted that tablet K is a variant of the reverse of G; this discovery was made simultaneously and independently by French scholar A. Metraux. Numerous shorter parallel fragments were later found using statistical analysis of the texts of tablets N and R.

Kudryavtsev's unfinished research enabled work to begin on creating a comprehensive catalog of signs, determining allographs, and more.

== Legacy ==
In literature:

- I. Rakhtanov. Descendants of Maklai. – Moscow: Detgiz, 1956. – 102 p.

== Sources ==
- Reshetov, Alexander Mikhailovich (1995). "Paying a debt. Part III. The Institute of Ethnography during the Great Patriotic War" (PDF). Ethnographic Review (6): 3–17.
