= Rimma Markova =

Russian actress (1925–2015)

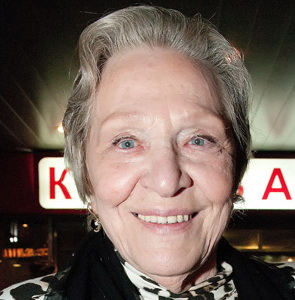
- Born: Rimma Vasilievna Markova; 3 March 1925; Churino, Samara Governorate, USSR
- Died: 15 January 2015 (aged 89); Moscow, Russia
- Occupation: Actress
- Years active: 1951–2015

Rimma Vasilievna Markova (Russian: Римма Васильевна Маркова; 3 March 1925 – 15 January 2015) was a Russian film actress. She was named a People's Artist of Russia in 1994, whereas her younger brother Leonid Markov was named a People's Artist of the USSR in 1985.

During her childhood from 1931 through 1934, Markova played minor roles in Saratov Dramatic Theatre, where her father was working. In 1945–1947, Rimma Markova studied at the school affiliated with the Vologda Dramatic Theatre with her brother Leonid. She appeared in small but memorable parts in numerous Soviet films.

Markova's public profile increased in the early 21st century. She began appearing regularly on Russian TV shows and campaigned enthusiastically for the Fair Russia political party during the 2011 legislative elections.

The party's candidate for the 2012 presidential election, Sergei Mironov, asked Markova to run his campaign. "Her popularity across the country is a part of mythology", he told the Moscow Times.

== Selected ilmography ==
- The Life and Adventures of Mishka Yaponchik (Жизнь и приключения Мишки Япончика, 2011) as Pani Basia
- Burnt by the Sun 2 (Утомлённые солнцем 2, 2011) as nurse
- The Best Movie (Самый лучший фильм, 2008) as mistress of prostitutes
- Day Watch (Дневной дозор, 2006) as witch Daria Schultz
- Night Watch (Ночной дозор, 2004) as witch Daria Schultz
- Okraina (Окраина, 1998) as Morozov's mother
- Gardemarines ahead! (Гардемарины, вперёд!, 1988) as Holy mother Leonidia
- The Pokrovsky Gate (Покровские ворота, 1982) as doctor
- Family Relations (Родня, 1981) as receptionist at the hotel
- Sweet Woman (Сладкая женщина, 1977) as Anna's mother
- Eternal Call (Вечный зов, 1973–83) as Vasilisa
- Woman's World (Бабье царство, 1967) as Nadezhda Petrovna
- Wings (Крылья, 1966) as Shura
- The Alive and the Dead (Живые и мёртвые, 1964) as episode (uncredited)
