= All-Union Film Festival =

- Location: Soviet Union
- Established: 1958
- Most recent: 1988

The All-Union Film Festival (Russian: Всесоюзный кинофестиваль; tr.:Vsesoyuznyy kinofestival, also known as ВКФ; VKF) was one of the most important film festivals of the Soviet Union. It was founded in 1958 and held regularly from 1964 to 1988. It was held annually from 1972 onwards, and bi-annually before that (before 1964, there were festivals in the years 1958, 1959 and 1960). Its time and location were determined by Goskino and the Union of Soviet Composers.

There were four categories among which prizes were handed out:

- Fiction films
- Documentaries, scientific-popular films, and film-journals
- Fiction films for children and youth (from 1977)
- Animated films (from 1977)

== Locations ==
1. 1964, Leningrad
2. 1966, Kiev
3. 1968, Leningrad
4. 1970, Minsk
5. 1972, Tbilisi
6. 1973, Alma-Ata
7. 1974, Baku
8. 1975, Kishinev
9. 1976, Frunze
10. 1977, Riga
11. 1978, Yerevan
12. 1979, Ashgabad
13. 1980, Dushanbe
14. 1981, Vilnius
15. 1982, Tallinn
16. 1983, Leningrad
17. 1984, Kiev
18. 1985, Minsk
19. 1986, Alma-Ata
20. 1987, Tbilisi
21. 1988, Baku
