= Mikhail Ulyanov (actor) =

Soviet–Russian actor

- Михаил Ульянов
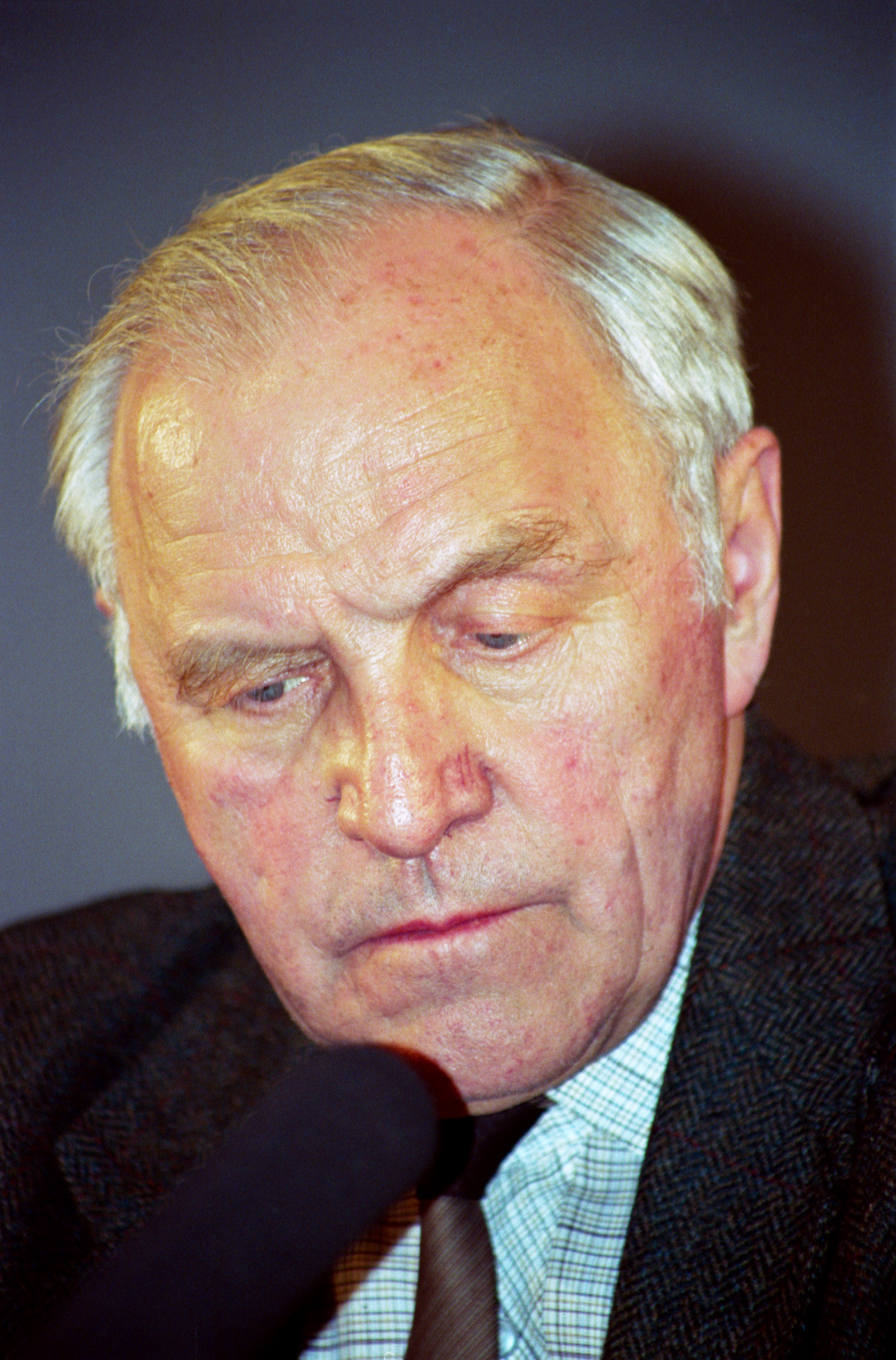
- Ulyanov in 1998
- Born: Mikhail Alexandrovich Ulyanov; 20 November 1927; Bergamak, Muromtsevsky District, Siberian Krai, Russian SFSR, Soviet Union
- Died: 26 March 2007 (aged 79); Moscow, Russia
- Occupations: Actor, filmmaker, theatre director
- Years active: 1950–2007
- Spouse: Alla Parfanyak
- Children: 1
- Awards: Hero of Socialist Labour; Order "For Merit to the Fatherland"; Order of Lenin; Order of the October Revolution; People's Artist of the USSR; People's Artist of the RSFSR; Honored Artist of the RSFSR; Meritorious Activist of Culture; Lenin Prize; USSR State Prize; Golden Mask; Letter of Gratitude from the President of Russia; Crystal Turandot Award; Nika Award

Mikhail Alexandrovich Ulyanov (Russian: Михаил Александрович Ульянов; 20 November 1927 – 26 March 2007) was a Soviet and Russian actor who was one of the most recognized persons of the post-World War II Soviet theatre and cinema. He was named a People's Artist of the USSR in 1969, a Hero of Socialist Labour in 1986, and received a special prize from the Venice Film Festival in 1982.

== Biography ==
Mikhail Alexandrovich Ulyanov spent his childhood and youth in the town of Tara, Omsk Oblast. Although he had failed his exams in the Schepkinskoe School and for the Moscow Art Theatre School, he moved to Omsk in 1944 to become an actor. After two years of studies in the studio at Omsk Drama Theatre he went to Moscow and entered the Schukin Theatre School in 1946.

Ulyanov worked in the Vakhtangov Theatre from 1950 and directed it from 1987. He played a wide range of characters on stage, with Rogozhin in Dostoevsky's Idiot being the most remarkable of them. In 1979 he staged Vasily Shukshin's epic novel ''I have come to give you freedom'', where he starred as Stepan Razin. In 1985 Mikhail Ulyanov staged the satirical pamphlet The Child Buyer by the American playwright John Hersey.

As regards movies, he was frequently cast in the parts of staunch Communist leaders like Vladimir Lenin and Marshal Zhukov. His well-known character Yegor Trubnikov in Predsedatel (Chairman) (1964) became a Soviet classic and his most emblematic role.

The Brothers Karamazov, a 1969 film he co-directed, was nominated for the Academy Award for Best Foreign Language Film and was entered into the 6th Moscow International Film Festival. He also starred in Tema (1979) and Private Life (1982), the films that won top awards at the Berlin Film Festival and the Venice Film Festival, respectively.

More recently, he was acclaimed for the roles of Julius Caesar in the screening of Shakespeare's play (1990), Pontius Pilate in the film adaptation of The Master and Margarita (1994), and an avenging veteran marksman in The Rifleman of the Voroshilov Regiment (1999), directed by Stanislav Govorukhin. He died on March 26, 2007, of an intestinal disease.

== Selected filmography ==
- They Were the First (1956) as Aleksey Kolyvanov
- Ekaterina Voronina (1957) as Sutyrin
- The House I Live In (1957) as Dmitry Fedorovich Kashirin
- Volunteers (1958) as Nikolai Kaitanov[
- Soldiers Walked... (1958) as Yegor
- City at Dawn (1959) as Belous
- Knock On Any Door' (1959) as Mikhail Prokhorov
- A Simple Story (1960) as Andrey Egorovich Danilov
- Baltic Skies (1961) as Rassokhin
- Battle on the Way (1961) as Dmitriy Bakhiryev
- Young and Green (1962) as Lizlov
- This Happened in the Рolice Station (1963) (voice)
- Silence (1964) as Pyotr Ivanovich Bykov
- The Alive and the Dead (1964) as Sergei Filippovich, Army Commander
- The Chairman (1964) as Yegor Trubnikov
- Solange Leben in mir ist (1965) as Frolow
- Frozen Flashes (1967) as general Alexander Gorbatov
- The Brothers Karamazov (1969) as Dmitri Karamazov
- Unterwegs zu Lenin (1969) as Lenin
- Liberation (1969-1971, part 1-5) as Marshall Georgy Zhukov
- The Flight (1970) as general Gregory Lukyanovich Charnota
- Anflug Alpha I (1971) as General Arkatow
- Trotz alledem! (1972) as Lenin
- The Sea is on Fire (1972) as Zhukov
- Yegor Bulychyov and Others (1972) as Yegor Bulychov
- The Last Day (1973) as Semyon Kolvalyov
- Siege of Leningrad (1974, 1977, part 1, 2) as Zhukov
- Take Aim (1975) as Georgy Zhukov
- The Legend of Til (1977) as Klaas
- Soldiers of Freedom (1977, TV Mini-Series) as Zhukov
- Call Me from Afar (1978) as Nikolay
- Wrong Connection (1978) as Ignat Maksimovich Nurkov
- The Theme (1979) as Kim Yesenin, writer
- The Last Escape (1981) as Kustov
- February Wind (1981) as Filimonov
- Facts of the Рast Day (1981) as Mikheev
- Private Life (1982) as Sergei Nikitich Abrikosov
- Without Witness (1983) as He
- If the Enemy Doesn't Give Up... (1983) as Zhukov
- Day of Commander of Divisions (1983) as Zhukov
- Victory (1985) as Zhukov
- Marshal Zhukov, biography pages (1985) as Zhukov
- Battle of Moscow (1985) as Zhukov
- Choice (1988) as Vladimir Vasilyev
- The Law (1989) as Zhukov
- Our Armed Train (1989)
- Stalingrad (1990) as Zhukov
- House under the Starry Sky (1991) as Andrey Nikolaevich Bashkirtsev, academician
- I Myself am a Vyatka Native (1992) as Alexandr Kirpikov
- The Master and Margarita (1994) as Pontius Pilate
- Cooperative "Politburo", or It Will Be A Long Goodbye (1992) as Ivan Ivanovich
- Everything Will Be Fine! (1995) as Grandpa
- Great Commander Georgy Zhukov (1995) as Zhukov
- Poor Liza (1998) as Liza's dad
- Composition for Victory Day (1998) as Dyakov
- The Rifleman of the Voroshilov Regiment (1999) as Ivan Fyodorovich Afonin
- Northern Lights (2001) as Old man in the country house
- Antikiller (2002) as Father, criminal boss

== Honours and awards ==
Ulyanov has won the following awards:

- Hero of Socialist Labour (1986)
- Order of Merit for the Fatherland, 3rd class (17 October 1996) - For services to the state and an outstanding contribution to theatrical art
- Two Orders of Lenin (1986)
- Order of the October Revolution (1977)
- Lenin Prize (1966) for his performance as Yegor Ivanovich Trubnikov in the feature film "The Chairman"
- Stanislavsky RSFSR State Prize (1975) for his role in the play Day in And Day Out
- USSR State Prize (1983) for playing Sergei Nikitich Abrikosov in the movie Private Lives (1982)
- People's Artist of the RSFSR (1965)
- People's Artist of the USSR (1969)
- Honoured Worker of Culture of the Polish People's Republic (1974)
- "Golden Lion" (Venice Film Festival, 1982) for starring in the movie Private Lives
- Order "For honour and valour for service to the Russian people and the badge "Golden Olympus" (2005)
- Sole honorary title of "Superstar" (2005)
- Kinotavr Award nomination for "Prize for creative careers" (1997)
- Award "Golden Aries" in 1999 for "Best Actor"
- Russian Federation President Prize in Literature and Art in 1998
- Crystal Turandot Award (1997)
- Golden Mask (1999)
- Award "Idol" (1999)
- In 2008, Russia's new arctic oil tanker has been named "Mikhail Ulyanov"
