= List of Soviet films of 1983 =

Title	Russian title	Director	Cast	Genre	Notes
1983
A Canary Cage	Клетка для канареек	Pavel Chukhray	Vyacheslav Baranov, Evgeniya Dobrovolskaya, Alisa Freyndlikh	Drama	
Among Grey Stones	Среди серых камней	Kira Muratova	Igor Sharapov	Drama	Screened at the 1988 Cannes Film Festival
And Life, and Tears, and Love	И жизнь, и слёзы, и любовь	Nikolay Gubenko	Zhanna Bolotova, Yelena Fadeyeva, Fyodor Nikitin	Drama	
Anxious Sunday	Тревожное воскресенье	Rudolf Fruntov	Klara Luchko	Disaster	
The Ballad of the Valiant Knight Ivanhoe	Баллада о доблестном рыцаре Айвенго	Sergei Tarasov	Tamara Akulova	Adventure	
Believe It or Not	Небывальщина	Sergei Ovcharov	Aleksandr Kuznetsov, Aleksey Buldakov, Sergey Bekhterev	Drama	
Black and White Magic	Магия чёрная и белая	Naum Birman	Pavel Plisov, Anton Granat, Margarita Ivanova	Comedy	
Blue Mountains	Голубые горы, или Неправдоподобная история	Eldar Shengelaia	Ramaz Giorgobiani	Comedy-drama	
Boys	Пацаны	Dinara Asanova	Valeriy Priyomykhov, Yevgeny Nikitin	Crime drama	
Cheburashka Goes to School	Чебурашка идёт в школу	Roman Abelevich Kachanov	Klara Rumyanova, Vasily Livanov	Animation	
Crazy Day of Engineer Barkasov	Безумный день инженера Баркасова	Nikolai Lyrichkov	Vasily Bochkarev, Natalya Sayko, Yevgeniya Khanayeva	Comedy	
Demidovs	Демидовы	Yaropolk Lapshin	Yevgeniy Yevstigneyev, Vadim Spiridonov, Aleksandr Lazarev	Drama	
Epilogue	Послесловие	Marlen Khutsiev	Andrey Myagkov	Drama	
Farewell	Прощание	Elem Klimov	Stefaniya Staniyuta, Lev Durov, Alexei Petrenko, Leonid Kryuk	Drama	
Flights in Dreams and Reality	Полёты во сне и наяву	Roman Balayan	Oleg Yankovsky, Lyudmila Gurchenko, Oleg Tabakov, Aleksandr Adabashyan	Drama	
From the Life of a Chief of the Criminal Police	Из жизни начальника уголовного розыска	Stepan Puchinyan	Kirill Lavrov, Leonid Filatov, Elena Proklova	Drama	
I Shall Never Forget	Я тебя никогда не забуду	Pavel Kadochnikov	Irina Malysheva, Evgeniy Karelskikh, Pavel Kadochnikov	Drama	
Ladies' Tango	Дамское танго	Sulambek Mamilov	Valentina Fedotova, Anatoly Vasilyev, Raisa Ryazanova	Drama	
Last Year's Snow Was Falling	Падал прошлогодний снег	Aleksandr Tatarskiy	Stanislav Sadalskiy	Animation	
Lethargy	Летаргия	Valeri Lonskoy	Andrey Myagkov, Natalya Sayko, Valentina Panina	Drama	
Look for a Woman	Ищите женщину	Alla Surikova	Sofiko Chiaureli, Leonid Kuravlyov, Sergei Yursky, Aleksandr Abdulov	Crime comedy	
Love by Request	Влюблён по собственному желанию	Sergei Mikaelyan	Oleg Yankovskiy, Yevgeniya Glushenko, Vsevolod Shilovsky	Comedy	Entered into the 33rd Berlin International Film Festival
Mary Poppins, Goodbye	Мэри Поппинс, до свидания!	Leonid Kvinikhidze	Natalya Andrejchenko, Albert Filozov, Lembit Ulfsak, Oleg Tabakov, Larisa Udovichenko	Musical	
Moon Rainbow	Лунная радуга	Andrei Yermash	Vladimir Gostyukhin	Science fiction	
Mother Mary	Мать Мария	Sergey Kolosov	Lyudmila Kasatkina, Leonid Markov	Biopic	Entered into the main competition at the 40th edition of the Venice Film Festival
Mournful Unconcern	Скорбное бесчувствие	Alexander Sokurov	Ramaz Chkhikvadze, Alla Osipenko	Drama	Not released until 1987, entered into Berlin
Nostalghia	Ностальгия	Andrei Tarkovsky	Oleg Yankovsky, Erland Josephson, Domiziana Giordano, Delia Boccardo	Drama	Won 2 awards at the 1983 Cannes Film Festival
Plead Guilty	Признать виновным	Igor Voznesensky	Aleksandr Mikhailov, Vladimir Shevelkov, Igor Rogachyov	Drama	
Quarantine	Карантин	Ilya Frez	Ailika Kremer	Comedy	
Recipe of Her Youth	Рецепт её молодости	Yevgeny Ginzburg	Lyudmila Gurchenko, Oleg Borisov, Aleksandr Abdulov	Comedy	
Return from Orbit	Возвращение с орбиты	Aleksandr Surin	Juozas Budraitis, Vitaly Solomin, Aleksandr Porokhovshchikov	Science fiction	
Rupture	Обрыв	Vladimir Vengerov	Georgi Antonov, Elena Finogeeva, Nikolay Kochegarov	Drama	
Secret of the Black Birds	Тайна «Чёрных дроздов»	Vadim Derbenyov	Ita Ever, Vladimir Sedov, Vsevolod Sanaev	Crime	
Semyon Dezhnev	Семён Дежнёв	Nikolai Gusarov	Aleksey Buldakov, Leonid Nevedomsky, Viktor Grigoryuk	Adventure	
Speed	Скорость	Dmitry Svetozarov	Aleksey Batalov, Dmitriy Kharatyan, Merle Talvik	Drama	
Start Liquidation	Приступить к ликвидации	Boris Grigoryev	Oleg Strizhenov, Mikhail Zhigalov, Vasily Lanovoy	Action	
Tender Age	Нежный возраст	Valeri Isakov	Yevgeny Dvorzhetskiy, Pavel Ilin, Alyona Belyak	Drama	
The Fourth Year of War	Шёл четвёртый год войны	Georgy Nikolaenko	Lyudmila Savelyeva, Nikolay Olyalin, Aleksandr Zbruev	War	
The Story of Voyages	Сказка странствий	Alexander Mitta	Andrei Mironov, Tatyana Aksyuta, Lev Durov	Fantasy	
The Treasures of Agra	Приключения Шерлока Холмса и доктора Ватсона: Сокровища Агры	Igor Maslennikov	Vasiliy Livanov	Crime	
The Trust That Went Bust	Трест, который лопнул	Aleksandr Pavlovsky	Regimantas Adomaitis, Nikolai Karachentsov, Leonid Kuravlyov, Mikhail Svetin	Musical	
Torpedo Bombers	Торпедоносцы	Semyon Aranovich	Rodion Nahapetov, Aleksey Zharkov, Andrei Boltnev	Drama	
Twice Born	Дважды рождённый	Arkadi Sirenko	Vyacheslav Baranov, Georgiy Drozd, Eduard Bocharov	War	
Vassa	Васса	Gleb Panfilov	Inna Churikova	Drama	Won the Golden Prize at the 13th Moscow International Film Festival
Vertical Race	Гонки по вертикали	Aleksander Muratov	Andrey Myagkov, Valentin Gaft	Crime	
Vitya Glushakov - A Friend of the Apaches	Витя Глушаков — друг апачей	Gerald Bezhanov	Leonid Kuravlyov, Andrei Yuritsyn, Ekaterina Semyonova	Comedy	
Wartime Romance	Военно-полевой роман	Pyotr Todorovsky	Nikolay Burlyaev, Natalya Andreychenko, Inna Churikova	Romantic drama	Churikova won the Silver Bear for Best Actress at Berlin
We Are from Jazz	Мы из джаза	Karen Shakhnazarov	Igor Sklyar	Comedy	
White Dew	Белые Росы	Igor Dobrolyubov	Vsevolod Sanayev, Nikolai Karachentsov, Mikhail Kokshenov, Gennady Garbuk, Boris Novikov	Comedy	
Without Witness	Без свидетелей	Nikita Mikhalkov	Irina Kupchenko, Mikhail Ulyanov	Drama	Won the Prix FIPRESCI at the 13th Moscow International Film Festival.
