= Georgy Taratorkin =

Soviet and Russian actor

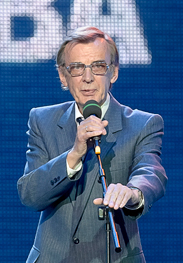
- Taratorkin in 2012
- Born: Georgiy Georgievich Taratorkin; 11 January 1945; Leningrad, RSFSR, USSR
- Died: 4 February 2017 (aged 72); Moscow, Russia
- Occupation: Actor
- Years active: 1966–2017
- Spouse: Ekaterina Markova
- Children: 2

Georgy Georgievich Taratorkin (Russian: Георгий Георгиевич Тараторкин; 11 January 1945 – 4 February 2017) was a Soviet-Russian film and stage actor who appeared in over 70 films between 1967 and 2017. He was the Secretary of the Union of Theatre Workers of the Russian Federation and President of the Association Golden Mask.

== Biography ==
Georgy Taratorkin was born on January 11, 1945, in Leningrad in the family of Georgy Georgievich Taratorkin and Nina Aleksandrovna Taratorkina. He grew up in a difficult post-war time. After school he worked as a lighting technician in the Theater for Young Spectators, where he was noticed by the artistic director of the theater Zinovy Korogodsky and was admitted to the drama studio at the Bryantsev Youth Theatre.

In 1966, he graduated from the studio and until 1974 played the leading roles in the Theater for Young Spectators.

In the cinema, the actor made his debut in 1967 as the role of regicide committer Grinevitsky in the film Sofiya Perovskaya. His portrayal of Raskolnikov in the film Crime and Punishment (1969) based on the novel by Fyodor Dostoevsky. Along with other filmmakers, the actor was awarded the USSR State Prize in 1971.

After this role in 1974, Taratorkin was invited to Moscow to the Mossovet Theatre, where he also successfully played the role of Raskolnikov in the play St. Petersburg Dreams by Yuri Zavadsky.

After Raskolnikov Taratorkin repeatedly acted in plays based on Dostoevsky's works. He played Ivan Karamazov in The Brothers Karamazov, staged by Pavel Chomsky (Mossovet Theater) and Stavrogin in The Devils, staged at the Moscow Pushkin Drama Theatre by Yuri Yeryomin.

On the stage of the Mossovet Theater Taratorkin also played roles in such performances.

Among the films of the actor: Unforgettable (1967), Thunderstorm over White (1968), The Labeled Atom (1972), Translation from English (1972), A Very English Murder (1974), Open Book (1977), Winner (1975), Deviation - zero (1977), Little Tragedies (1979). The actor starred in the television series The Chronicles of the Love of Death, The Savior Under the Birches (2003), The Gentle Monster (2004), The Chess Player (2004), Not Born Beautiful (2005-2006).

Georgy Taratorkin also starred in two films of Russian director Alexander Khvan — Dyuba-Dyuba (1992) and Die Easy (2000). He played a role in the action movie 24 Hours (2000). Among the last motion pictures of the actor were The Captivity of Passion (2010), Where the Motherland Begins (2014), Ban (2015), The Mysterious Passion (2015).

Along with work in the theater and cinema, Georgy Taratorkin has also recorded many audiobooks. In the 1970s and 1980s, the actor gave a lot of poetry readings of Alexander Blok and other poets of the Silver Age on radio and stage.

In 1992, Taratorkin tried himself as a director with the film The One Who Did not Come, and in 2004 he voiced the Russian cartoon The Nutcracker and the Mouse King. Since 1996, he taught acting at VGIK.

In 1996, Georgy Taratorkin was elected first secretary of the Union of Theatre Workers of the Russian Federation, since 2001 he served as secretary of the Union of Russian Theater Workers. He was also the president of the Russian National Theater Award and the Golden Mask festival.

In 2008, Taratorkin became a supporter of the United Russia party.

Taratorkin died following a prolonged illness on 4 February 2017 at the age of 72.

== Personal life ==
Taratorkin was married to actress and screenwriter Ekaterina Markova. They had two children, Filipp and Anna.

== Honors ==
People's Artist of the RSFSR (1984), laureate of the Vasilyev Brothers State Prize of the RSFSR (1971). He was awarded the Order of Merit for the Fatherland, 4th Degree (2005), Honor (1998), Badge of Honor (1971).

In 2000, the St. Petersburg International Fund Classic-Center awarded him the Golden Order Creator of Petersburg.

== Selected filmography ==
- Sofiya Perovskaya (1967)
- Crime and Punishment (1970)
- A Very English Murder (1974)
- Story of an Unknown Man (1980)
- Moon Rainbow (1983)
- Little Tragedies (1987)
- Dyuba-Dyuba (1992)
- Not Born Beautiful (TV, 2005-2006)
