= Silence (1963 film) =

- Directed by: Vladimir Basov
- Written by: Vladimir Basov; Yuri Bondarev
- Produced by: Victor Tsirul
- Starring: Vitali Konyayev; Georgy Martyniuk; Larisa Luzhina; Vladimir Yemelyanov; Mikhail Ulyanov
- Cinematography: Timofey Lebeshev
- Edited by: Lyudmila Pechieva
- Music by: Veniamin Basner
- Production company: Mosfilm
- Release date: 1963
- Running time: 209 min
- Country: Soviet Union
- Language: Russian

Silence (Russian: Тишина, romanized: Tishina) is a Soviet two-part feature film directed by Vladimir Basov and based on the 1962 novel of the same name by Yuri Bondarev. The film won the main prize of the All-Union Film Festival.

== Plot ==
In 1945, with other servicemen, demobilized after the end of World War II, 22-year-old Captain Sergey Vohmintsev, commander of an artillery battery, returns from Germany. The young soldier looks with hope to the future of peaceful life, for he began dating a girl geologist Nina.

However, Sergei's joy is overshadowed by a meeting with another ex-battalion commander, Arkady Uvarov, who left his battery to perish and shifted the blame to a junior commander who was court-martialled and killed in a penal battalion. Vokhmintsev, the only survivor of the tragedy, publicly denounces Uvarov. The conflict that arose in the restaurant ends with a fine for petty hooliganism. At the meeting of the new 1946, where Sergei comes along with Nina, Uvarov again appears. He utters patriotic toasts and offers his friendship, but Vohmintsev refuses to drink with him for Stalin and leads Nina away, leaving the guests. Uvarov, who for the second time hardly avoided publicly exposing his shameful past, did not forget this.

Three years later. Sergey studies in the Mining and Metallurgical Institute, where he went after the advice of Nina, and lives with her father and younger sister in a communal apartment, side by side with family of the artist Mukomolov, who is the author of paintings called ideologically alien by the authorities, and the unprincipled citizen Bykov, dreaming to expand his living space. Denounced either by his neighbor or by someone else, the old communist Nikolai Vohmintsev gets arrested by MGB, but he considers this to be a mistake and believes that everything will be sorted out. Sergey also believes in justice: to defend the good name of his father before the competent authorities, he needs time, and so he comes to the dean's office with a request to exempt him from the summer internship.

But the institute has been already informed about his father's arrest, and Uvarov, being an excellent student, activist, a member of the bureau and best friend of the Party Secretary of the institute, is happy to take advantage of the opportunity and destroy his accuser. Student Vohmintsev is severely told off during the party committee, where everything gets recalled at once: the suspicious case with the loss of the safe with documents after the regiment where his father was the Party commissary got out of the besiegement, the hooliganism in a public place, the refusal to drink for the health of the leader. To crown it, Uvarov, using his authority, cynically accuses Sergei of the crime he himself has committed: after all, the war did not leave any other witnesses. This results in the decision to expel Vohmintsev from the Communist Party after which the maligned student submits the letter of resignation from the institute.

Sergei leaves far away from his native place, to Kazakhstan, where even with his stained biography he is able to get a job in his specialty, and lives without abandoning the hope that sooner or later the truth will be uncovered. Most important is that Nina believes him. Perhaps she will decide to join her beloved.

== Cast ==
- Vitali Konyayev as Sergey Vohmintsev
- Georgy Martyniuk as Konstantin Korabelnikov
- Larisa Luzhina as Nina
- Natalya Velichko as Asya Vohmintseva, Sergei's sister
- Mikhail Ulyanov as Pyotr Ivanovich Bykov
- Vladimir Yemelyanov as Nikolai Grigorievich Vohmintsev
- Georgiy Zhzhonov as Akim Nikitich Gnezdilov
- Vladimir Zemlyanikin as Grigory Kosov
- Yevgeni Lazarev as Arkady Uvarov
- Ivan Pereverzev as Lukovsky
- Lidiya Smirnova as Seraphima Ignatyevna Bykova
- Vladimir Basov as driver

== Music ==
The film features the wartime song "On the Nameless Height", with lyrics by Mikhail Matusovsky and music by Veniamin Basner. The song was written for the film and was first performed in the film by singer-actor Lev Barashkov.

== Release ==
The film takes 365th place in the history of Soviet hire. It was watched by a 30.3 million audience.
