= Konyayev =

Konyayev (masculine, Russian: Коняев) or Konyayeva (feminine, Russian: Коняева) is a Russian surname. Notable people with the surname include:

- Nadezhda Konyayeva (born 1931, date of death unknown), Soviet Russian javelin thrower
- Vitali Konyayev (1937–2023), Soviet Russian actor
