= The Days of the Turbins (film) =

1976 Soviet drama film

- Written by: Vladimir Basov
- Directed by: Vladimir Basov
- Starring: Andrey Myagkov; Andrei Rostotsky; Valentina Titova; Oleg Basilashvili
- Music by: Veniamin Basner
- Country of origin: Soviet Union
- Original language: Russian

Production
- Producer: Dmitry Zalbshtein
- Cinematography: Leonid Krainenkov; Ilia Minkovetskiy
- Editor: Lyudmila Badorina
- Running time: 223 minutes
- Production company: Mosfilm

Original release
- Release: 1976

The Days of the Turbins (Russian: Дни Турбиных, romanized: Dni Turbinykh) is a 1976 Soviet three-part television drama film. It was directed and written by Vladimir Basov and based on the play with the same name by Mikhail Bulgakov (itself Bulgakov's adaptation of his novel The White Guard for the stage).

== Plot ==
The film tells about the intelligentsia, the Russian Revolution and the life of the family of Turbin officers during the Russian Civil War.

In Kiev, during the winter of 1918-1919, power in the city passes successively from the Hetman to the Directorate of Ukraine to Petliura and to the Bolsheviks. The Turbins and their acquaintances must make their choice. Colonel Alexei Turbin and his brother Nicholas remain loyal to the White movement, bravely defend it, and do not worry about their lives. Elena's (née Turbin) husband, Vladimir Talberg, flees shamefully from the city with the retreating German troops.

Despite the troubled times, the family and its close friends gather and celebrate New Year's Day. A strange and slightly ridiculous person comes to visit them and is a distant relative of the Turbins, Larion Surzhansky (Lariosik).

== Cast ==
- Andrey Myagkov — Alexei Vasilievich Turbin
- Andrei Rostotsky — Nikolai Vasilievich Turbin
- Valentina Titova — Elena Talberg
- Oleg Basilashvili — Vladimir Robertovich Talberg
- Vladimir Basov — Viktor Viktorovich Myshlaevsky
- Vasily Lanovoy — Leonid Yurievich Shervinsky
- Pyotr Shcherbakov — Alexander Bronislavovich Studzinsky
- Sergey Ivanov — Lariosik (Larion Larionovich Surzhansky)
- Viktor Chekmaryov — Vasily Ivanovich Lisovich
- Margarita Krinitsyna — Vanda, wife of Lisovich
- Vladimir Samoilov — Hetman Skoropadsky
- Gleb Strizhenov — General von Shratt
- Vadim Grachyov — von Doost
- Nikolay Smorchkov — first officer
- Igor Bezyayev — Lieutenant Kopylov
- Mikhail Selyutin — third officer, lieutenant
- Fyodor Nikitin — Maxim
- Ivan Ryzhov — the footman Fedor
- Dmitry Orlovsky — the postman
- Boryslav Brondukov — the Bolshevik agitator
- Leo Perfilov — city dweller

== See also ==
The White Guard, a Russian 2012 television series.
