= Where Does the Motherland Begin? =

"Where Does the Motherland Begin?" or "What Does the Homeland Begin With?" (Russian: С чего начинается Родина, romanized: S chego nachinayetsya Rodina) is a Soviet song composed by Veniamin Basner with lyrics by Mikhail Matusovsky for the four-part film The Shield and the Sword (Щит и меч, Shchit i mech), in 1968. The melody of the song was the main musical theme of the film. The song was performed by Mark Bernes. The song was a great success and was adopted as an unofficial anthem by the Soviet and then Russian secret service.
