= Ussishkin (disambiguation) =

Ussishkin may refer to:

- Menachem Ussishkin
- David Ussishkin
- Ussishkin, a character in the 1972 Soviet comedy film As Ilf and Petrov rode a tram
- Ussishkin Street, Tel-Aviv
- Ussishkin Arena, Tel-Aviv
- Hapoel Ussishkin, a former Israeli basketball club
