= Vitali Konyayev =

Russian film and theatre actor (1937–2023)

- Born: Vitali Anatolievich Konyayev; 11 May 1937; Kronstadt, Russian SFSR, USSR
- Died: 30 September 2023 (aged 86); Moscow, Russia
- Years active: 1958–2023
- Awards: Honored Artist of the RSFSR (1974); People's Artist of Russia (1998)

Vitali Anatolievich Konyayev (Russian: Виталий Анатольевич Коняев; 11 May 1937 – 30 September 2023) was a Soviet and Russian film and theatre actor. He was awarded the People's Artist of Russia title in 1998.

== Biography ==
Vitali Konyayev was born on 11 May 1937. In 1958 he graduated from the Mikhail Shchepkin Higher Theatre School (class of Leonid Volkov). Since 1958 he has been an actor in the troupe of the State academic Maly Theatre.

From 1972 to 1982, he taught at the Shchepkin School, including leading the teaching of stage fencing. He taught at Moscow State University and was working as a teacher at the International Slavic Institute of Derzhavin.

His debut film role as Aleksey Gromov was in the movie Stokes in a Door (1958). He is best known for his work in the film Vladimir Basov Silence (1963). He had been a Member of the Union of theatrical figures (since 1960) and the Union of Cinematographers (1964). For solo concerts, he has travelled all over Russia and about 30 countries (including US, Canada, Spain, France, Finland and Sweden).

For several years he headed the jury of the All-Russian Theatre Festival named Nikolai Rybakov in Tambov.

== Personal life ==
His parents were Anatoli Mikhaylovich Konyayev (born 30 March 1909) and Valentina Nikolaevna Konyaeva (born 14 December 1910).

Konyayev had a daughter, actress Elena Drobysheva (born 1964) with the People's Artist of the RSFSR 1985 actress Nina Drobysheva (born 1939). From his second marriage to Tatiana Stanislavskaya he had a son Dmitry (born 1987).

Vitali Konyayev died on 30 September 2023, at the age of 86.

== Selected filmography ==
- Clear Skies (1961) as Petya
- Flower on the Stone (1962) as miner
- Silence (1963) as Sergey Vohmintsev
- The Red and the White (1967) as whiteguard
- The Shield and the Sword (1968) as Paul
- Day by Day (1972) as Igor
- The Last Day (1972) as episode
