= Boris Ivanov (actor) =

Russian actor (1920–2002)

Boris Ivanov PAR
- Born: Boris Vladimirovich Ivanov; 28 February 1920; Odessa, Ukrainian SSR
- Died: 2 December 2002 (aged 82); Moscow, Russia
- Occupation: actor
- Years active: 1944–2002

Boris Vladimirovich Ivanov (Russian: Бори́с Влади́мирович Ивано́в; 1920 — 2002) was a Soviet and Russian film and theater actor. People's Artist of the RSFSR (1981).

== Selected filmography ==
- Hussar Ballad (1962) as general Ducier
- All the King's Men (1971, TV Mini-Series) as Daffy
- Investigation Held by ZnaToKi (1971, TV Mini-Series) as Shakhov
- A Man Before His Time (1972) as Uncle Jean
- Much Ado About Nothing (1973) as Leonato
- A Very English Murder (1974) as Warbeck
- Agony (1974) as Dr. Lasovert
- From Dawn Till Sunset (1975) as Savely, a singer in a restaurant
- Take Aim (1975) as Leo Szilard (uncredited)
- Eternal Call (1976, TV Series) as Shef kontrrazvedki
- Father Sergius (1977) as hegumen
- Lenin in Paris (1981) as Zhitomirsky
- Moon Rainbow (1983) as Martin Weber
- Chance (1984) as Nikita Savich
- Time of Desires (1984) as Andrey Sergeyevich
- Contract (1985, Short) as representative of a company (voice)
- Do Not Marry, Girls (1985) as Boris Alexandrovich, Minister
- The End of Eternity (1987) as Sennor Calculator
