= Tender Age =

Tender Age may refer to:

- Tender Age (2000 film), a Russian drama film
- Tender Age (1983 film), a Soviet war drama film
