= Boris Novikov =

Soviet actor

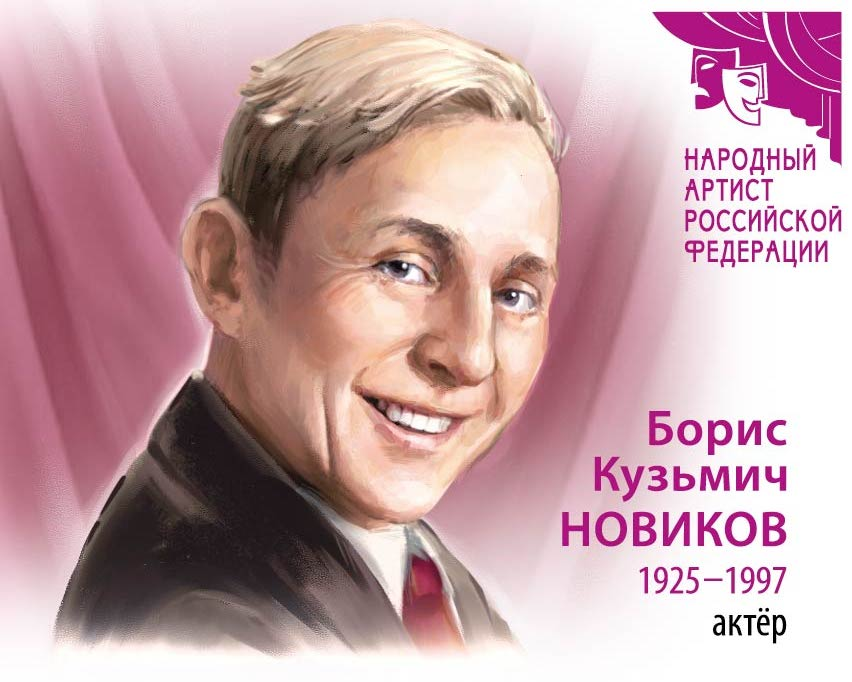
- Born: 13 July 1925; Ryazhsk, Soviet Union
- Died: 25 July 1997 (aged 72); Moscow, Russia
- Resting place: Danilov Cemetery
- Occupation: Actor
- Years active: 1948—1996
- Spouse: Nadezhda Klimovich
- Children: son Sergey (born 1949)
- Awards: (1994) (1961) (1946) (1948)

Boris Kuzmich Novikov (Russian: Бори́с Кузьми́ч Но́виков; 13 July 1925, Ryazhsk, Ryazan Governorate, RSFSR — 25 July 1997, Moscow) was a Soviet actor of theater and cinema. People's Artist of Russia (1994).

== Biography ==
Boris Kuzmich Novikov was born on 13 July 1925 in a family of laborers at the station Ryazhsk-1, Ryazan Oblast. In school years he participated in amateur performances, and later fought at the front in the Great Patriotic War, as the Eastern Front of World War II was known in Russia.

He graduated from the School-Studio of Yuri Zavadsky in 1948. Since 1948 he worked as an actor of the Mossovet Theater, in 1963-1972 was the actor of the Moscow Satire Theatre.

In 1972, due to diabetic illness, he stopped playing in theatre and only worked in film. He played in over 150 films and also voiced animated films. Novikov is well known as an actor of episodic roles, and was dubbed as the "King of the Episode". Novikov had leading roles in the film adaptation of Alexander Pushkin's Shot, in the comedy Seven Old Men and a Girl, historical film The Shadows Fade at Noon, drama Father and Son, comedy The Talking Monkey.

The last picture in which Boris Novikov starred was the adventure film The Return of the Battleship, released in the year of his death.

He died of complications from diabetes on 25 July 1997 in Moscow. The actor was buried at the Danilov Cemetery in Moscow.

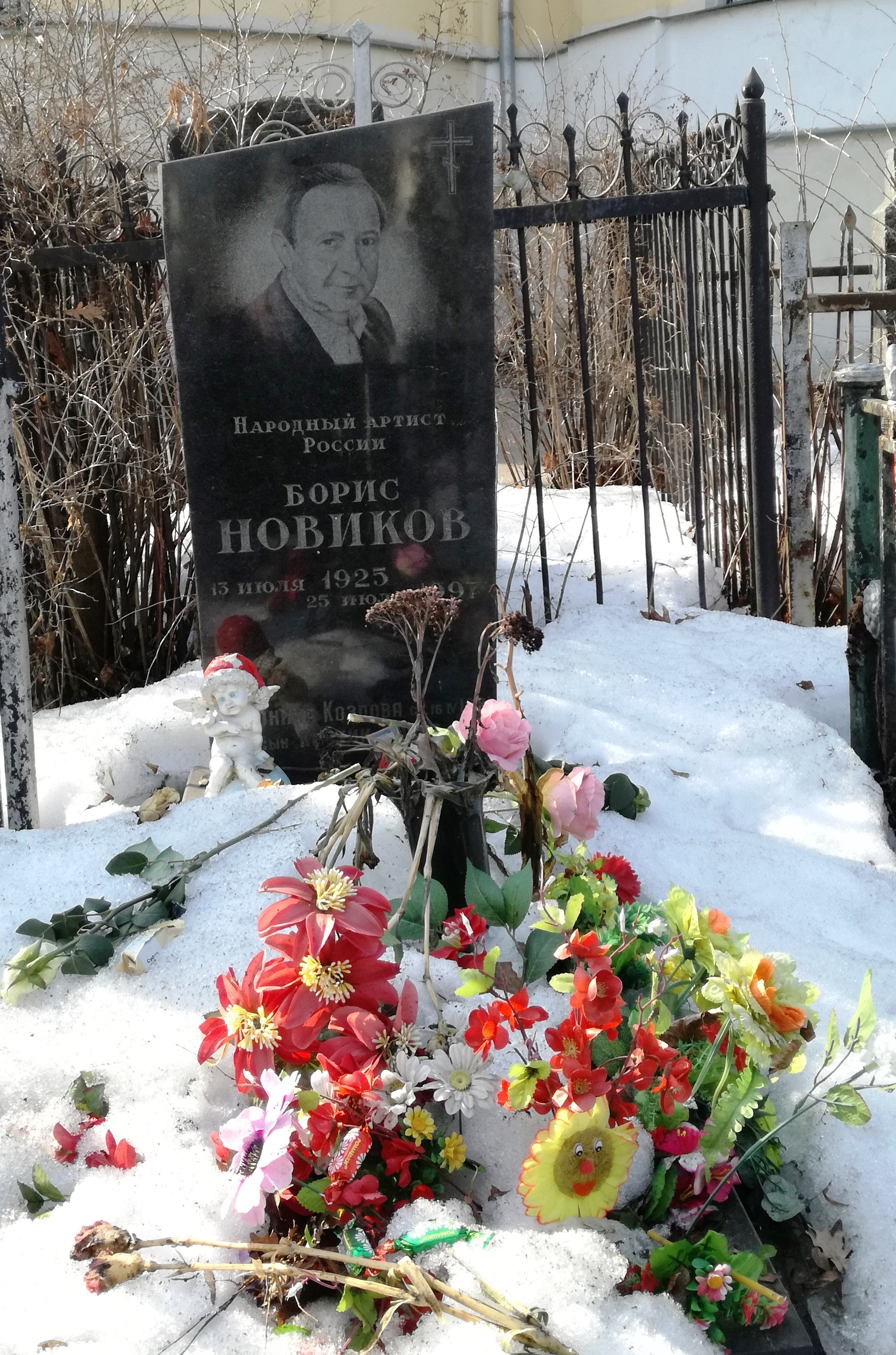
Grave of Boris Novikov

=== Personal life ===
His wife was Nadezhda Antonovna Klimovich (died in 2008), an actress of the Moscow Youth Theater. They had a son Sergei, born in 1949.

== Selected filmography ==
- 1955: Behind the Shop Window as bully (uncredited)
- 1957: And Quiet Flows the Don as Mitka Korshunov
- 1958: A Girl with a Guitar as Tsyplakov
- 1961: Chronicle of Flaming Years as Mandryka
- 1961: The Cossacks as Nazarka
- 1961: Scarlet Sails as painter
- 1961: My Friend, Kolka! as Kuzma
- 1966: A Pistol Shot as Kuzka
- 1968: Seven Old Men and a Girl as Stepan Bubnov
- 1969: The Adjutant of His Excellency as Isaac Liberson, the Kiev jeweler
- 1981: The Suicide Club, or the Adventures of a Titled Person as General Wendeler
- 1983: The Trust That Went Bust as The artillerist
- 1983: Crazy Day of Engineer Barkasov as stoker
- 1983: White Dew as Timofei

== Honours and awards ==
- Medal "For Valiant Labour in the Great Patriotic War 1941–1945"
- Medal "In Commemoration of the 800th Anniversary of Moscow"
