= Valentina Titova =

Soviet and Russian actress

- Born: 6 February 1942 (age 84); Korolyov, Moscow Oblast, RSFSR, USSR
- Occupation: actress

Valentina Antipovna Titova (Russian: Валентина Антиповна Титова; February 6, 1942 in Korolyov, Moscow Oblast SSSR) is a Russian actress.

== Biography ==
Valentina Antipovna Titova was born on 6 February 1942 in the city of Korolyov, Moscow Oblast.

As a schoolgirl, Valentina Titova debuted on the stage of the Palace of Culture. Then she became an actress in the Sverdlovsk Youth Theatre and then went to work at the Tovstonogov Bolshoi Drama Theater.

In 1964, she graduated from the studio of Tovstonogov Bolshoi Drama Theater in Leningrad.

In 1970-1992 she was an actress of the National Film Actors' Theatre in Moscow.

Her film debut was an episodic role in the 1963 drama All Remains to People by Georgy Natanson.

In her graduation year, Valentina Titova played her first major film role in the drama The Blizzard (1964) directed by Vladimir Basov, based on the story of the same name by Alexander Pushkin. In 1968 she got a role in the popular movie The Shield and the Sword, which brought her more recognition.

Titova's other famous roles were in the films The Dangerous Turn (1972), The Days of the Turbins (1976), Father Sergius (1978), Petrovka, 38 (1979), Carnival (1981), Professor Dowell's Testament (1984), It is not Recommended to Offend Women (2000).

Among the latest films featuring Valentina Titova was the melodrama of Evgeny Matveyev To Love in Russian (1995), the crime film of Alexander Hwang To Die Easy (1999), the series The Other Life (2003) directed by Elena Raiskaya and the comedy of Martiros Fanosian Unexpected Joy (2005).

== Selected filmography ==
- All Remains to People (1963)
- The Blizzard (1964)
- East Corridor (1966)
- Magician (1967)
- The Shield and the Sword (1968)
- Big School-Break (1972)
- The Days of the Turbins (1976)
- Sentimental Romance (1976)
- Mimino (1977)
- Father Sergius (1978)
- Star Inspector (1980)
- Carnival (1981)
- Tender Age (1983)
- TASS Is Authorized to Declare... (1984)
- Dead Souls (1984)
- Professor Dowell's Testament (1984)
- Unexpected Joy (2005)

== Family ==
- Her first husband - actor, director Vladimir Basov
  - Son Alexander (1965)
  - Daughter Elizaveta (1971)
- Second husband - cinematographer Georgy Rerberg
