= Investigation Led by Experts =

- Also known as: Investigation Led by ZnaToKi
- Starring: Georgy Martyniuk; Leonid Kanevsky; Elza Lezhdey
- Countries of origin: Soviet Union; Russia
- Original language: Russian
- No. of episodes: 24

Original release
- Release: 1971 – 2003

Investigation Led by ZnaToKi, or Investigation Led by Experts (Russian: Следствие ведут ЗнаТоКи, translit. Sledstvie vedut ZnaToKi) was a popular 1971-1989 Soviet detective TV-series with two Russian series (2002 and 2003) for a total of 24 episodes.

Main characters — investigator Pavel Znamenski, detective Alexandr Tomin and laboratory analyst Zinaida Kibrit — were acting together under a group name ZnaToKi (translated as "Experts").

The song by Mark Minkov based on the lyrics Invisible Battle (Nezrimiy Boi or Our mission is both dangerous and difficult, and most invisible at first glance...) by Anatoly Gorokhov features in almost all series. It became an unofficial hymn of the Soviet Militia.

== Original cast members ==
- Georgy Martyniuk as Pavel Znamenski, Senior investigator
- Leonid Kanevsky as Aleksandr Tomin, Senior Inspector-detective
- Elza Lezhdey as Zinaida Kibrit, laboratory analyst
- Lidia Velezheva as Kitaeva, laboratory analyst (since 2002, after Elza Lezhdey's death)
- Vera Vasilyeva as Margarita Nikolayevna Znamenskaya, Znamenski's mother
- Semen Sokolovskiy as Colonel Skopin, Chief of Investigation department, Znamenski's boss
- Lev Durov as Afanasiy Filippov, Senior Inspector of GAI (traffic police)
- Anatoly Grachyov as Mikhail Tokarev, Senior Inspector of OBKhSS (financial police)

=== Occasional cast ===
- Boris Ivanov
- Yuri Katin-Yartsev
- Leonid Bronevoy
- Grigory Lyampe
- Georgy Menglet
- Valery Nosik
- Stanislav Chekan
- Nikolai Karachentsov
- Leonid Markov
- Iya Savvina
- Leonid Kuravlyov
- Armen Dzhigarkhanyan
- Alexander Kaidanovsky
- Andrey Kharitonov

== TV episodes ==
- Sledstvie vedut znatoki. Case #1: Black Broker / Chyornyy makler (1971)
- Sledstvie vedut znatoki. Case #2: What Is Your True Name / Vashe podlinnoe imya (1971)
- Sledstvie vedut znatoki. Case #3: Red-handed / S polichnym (1971)
- Sledstvie vedut znatoki. Case #4: A Fault Confessed... / Povinnuyu golovu... (1971)
- Sledstvie vedut znatoki. Case #5: Dinosaur / Dinozavr (1972)
- Sledstvie vedut znatoki. Case #6: Blackmail / Shantazh (1972)
- Sledstvie vedut znatoki. Case #7: Accident / Neschastnyy sluchay (1972)
- Sledstvie vedut znatoki. Case #8: The Escape / Pobeg (1973)
- Sledstvie vedut znatoki. Case #9: Witness / Svidetel (1974)
- Sledstvie vedut znatoki. Case #10: Strike Back / Otvetnyy udar (1975)
- Sledstvie vedut znatoki. Case #11: At Any Price / Lyuboy tsenoy (1977)
- Sledstvie vedut znatoki. Case #12: 'Bouquet' Is Standing By / 'Buket' na priyome (1977)
- Sledstvie vedut znatoki. Case #13: Before the Third Gunshot / Do tretyego vystrela (1978)
- Sledstvie vedut znatoki. Case #14: Herdsboy With a Cucumber / Podpasok s ogurtsom (1979)
- Sledstvie vedut znatoki. Case #15: Went and Never Returned / Ushyol i ne vernulsya (1980)
- Sledstvie vedut znatoki. Case #16: From the Life of Fruits / Iz zhizni fruktov (1981)
- Sledstvie vedut znatoki. Case #17: He's Somewhere Here / On gde-to zdes' (1982)
- Sledstvie vedut znatoki. Case #18: Midday Thief / Poludennyy vor (1985)
- Sledstvie vedut znatoki. Case #19: The Fire / Pozhar (1985)
- Sledstvie vedut znatoki. Case #20: Boomerang / Bumerang (1987)
- Sledstvie vedut znatoki. Case #21: Without Knife and Knuckleduster / Bez nozha i kasteta (1988)
- Sledstvie vedut znatoki. Case #22: Mafia / Mafiya (1989)
- Sledstvie vedut znatoki. Case #23: Arbitrator / Treteyskiy sudiya (2002)
- Sledstvie vedut znatoki. Case #24: Pood Of Gold / Pud zolota (2003)

See ru:Категория:Следствие ведут ЗнаТоКи for Russian Wikipedia articles on individual episodes.
