= Father Sergius (1978 film) =

1978 film directed by Igor Talankin

- Directed by: Igor Talankin
- Written by: Leo Tolstoy (novel); Igor Talankin
- Starring: Sergei Bondarchuk; Valentina Titova; Vladislav Strzhelchik; Nikolai Gritsenko; Boris Ivanov
- Cinematography: Georgy Rerberg; Anatoly Nikolayev
- Music by: Alfred Schnittke
- Production company: Mosfilm
- Release date: 1978
- Running time: 115 minutes
- Country: Soviet Union
- Language: Russian

Father Sergius (Russian: Отец Сергий, romanized: Otets Sergiy) is a 1978 Soviet drama film directed by Igor Talankin who also adapted the story based on the posthumously published 1911 short story of the same name by Leo Tolstoy.

== Plot ==
Prince Stepan Kasatsky, an officer, ardent, proud young man is a big admirer of the king. Kasatsky is about to get married, but at the last moment learns from the bride that she was the mistress of the emperor. The prince is disappointed in secular life, he takes a monastic vow and leaves the capital. Faith in God was supposed to save his soul, but passions and worldly temptations do not leave Kasatsky.

Father Sergius (Kasatsky's new name) leads the hermit's way of life, strictly adhering to order and pacifying the flesh. Deciding that this is not enough - he decides to leave the monastery. He becomes a recluse and starts to live in a cave. Rumors about a former handsome officer who took tonsure, reach a group of people who are resting nearby the monk's cave. A beautiful depraved woman tries to seduce him, and Father Sergius has to cut off his finger to avoid succumbing to her charms. More time passes, and he still does not manage to avoid sin. The feeble-minded daughter of a local merchant, who was led to the hermit for prayer therapy, seduces the monk.

Father Sergius leaves the monastic cell, takes a knapsack and goes off to wander and beg.

== Cast ==
- Sergei Bondarchuk as Stepan Kasatsky / Father Sergius
- Valentina Titova as Maria Korotkova
- Vladislav Strzhelchik as Nicholas I of Russia
- Nikolai Gritsenko as General Korotkov, husband of Maria
- Boris Ivanov as hegumen
- Ivan Lapikov as old man on the ferry
- Ivan Solovyov as Reverend Nicodemus
- Lyudmila Maksakova as Daria Makovkina
- Georgi Burkov as a merchant
- Olga Anokhina as Maria, the daughter of a merchant
- Alla Demidova as Pashenka
- Dima Streltsov as Cadet Stepan of Kasatsky
- Alyosha Proskuryakov as little Stevenka
- Sasha Levchenko as little Pashenka
- Irina Skobtseva as Baroness at the Ball
- Alexander Dick as The Marquis
- Aleksandr Belyavsky as master on the ferry
- Katya Bystrova as daughter of Maria
- Nikolai Gorlov as father of Nicodemus
- Vatslav Dvorzhetsky as Director of the Cadet Corps
- Eduard Izotov as lawyer on Shrovetide
- Valentin Kulik as landowner
- Alexander Lebedev as monk
- Vladimir Mashchenko as Captain Schwartz
- Yuriy Nazarov as a man on the ferry
- Andrey Smolyakov as novice Alyosha
- Arkady Trusov as priest
- Svetlana Svetlichnaya as lady (uncredited)
- Vladimir Ivashov as episode
- Sergei Nikonenko as episode
- Natalya Fateyeva as episode
- Victor Shulgin as episode
- Vladimir Basov as episode (uncredited)

== Awards ==
=== All-Union Film Festival (1979) ===
- Sergey Bondarchuk - Prize for Best Actor
- Georgy Rerberg - Prize for Fine Decision
- Victor Petrov - Prize for Fine Decision
- Anatoly Nikolaev - Prize for Fine Decision
- Yuri Fomenko - Prize for the Fine decision
