= Big School-Break =

- Created by: Gosteleradio
- Written by: Aleksei Korenev; Georgy Sadovnikov
- Directed by: Aleksei Korenev
- Starring: Mikhail Kononov; Aleksandr Zbruyev; Yevgeny Leonov; Rolan Bykov; Lyudmila Kasatkina
- Theme music composer: Eduard Kolmanovsky
- Country of origin: Soviet Union
- Original language: Russian
- No. of episodes: 4

Production
- Cinematography: Anatoly Mukasei
- Running time: 268 min

Original release
- Release: 1972 – 1973

Big School-Break (or Big Break translit. Bolshaya Peremena, Russian: Большая перемена) is a Soviet 1972 TV miniseries in 4 episodes. It was known in the US as The Long Recess, and it is loosely based on Georgy Sadovnikov's novel Walk towards people (Иду к людям).

Sadovnikov was offered to write a script for a film about the life of evening school students using his novel, with the condition that the film's director would be the co-author.

== Plot ==
Nestor Petrovich Severov, a student preparing to begin his PhD in Russian history, has his ego bruised when his girlfriend, Polina, beats him on their entrance exam, taking the spot he had hoped to secure. Frustrated, he breaks up with her and decides to teach at a night school, where he soon discovers that educating adults, especially those reluctant to learn, is far from easy. He’s assigned as the homeroom teacher of 9th "A"—a diverse group of working-class adults, many of whom are older than he is. His students include the rebellious Grigory Ganja, who consistently disrupts classes, showing little respect for academic effort, and Nelli Ledneva, a student with a crush on Nestor, who awkwardly shares the class with her father, Stepan Lednev. Despite the challenges, Nestor becomes deeply invested in the lives of his students, attempting to navigate their issues with patience and persistence.

The classroom dynamics unfold further as Nestor works to help struggling students find their own paths. Grigory’s misbehavior strains his marriage to his wife Svetlana, a literature teacher at the school, and she eventually leaves him. However, with Nestor’s support, Grigory takes responsibility for his actions, leading to their reconciliation. Another challenging student, Gennady Lyapishev, continuously skips lessons to go dancing, but with the influence of Alexander Petrykin—a strict yet dedicated colleague—Nestor steers Gennady toward self-improvement. Meanwhile, Stepan’s daughter, Nelli, grows embarrassed by her father’s earnestness, even trying to bar him from attending class, though he finds his own way to participate. Eventually, Nestor’s sincere commitment to his students is rewarded not only by their growth but also by Polina’s return, recognizing the maturity and resilience he has gained through his transformative journey as an educator.

== Cast ==
- Mikhail Kononov as Nestor Petrovich Severov, the history teacher
- Yevgeny Leonov as Stepan Lednyov
- Rolan Bykov as Alexander Petrykin
- Aleksandr Zbruyev as Grigory Ganzha
- Svetlana Kryuchkova as Nelli Lednyova
- Yanis Yakobson as Nelli’s school-desk neighbour
- Yuriy Kuzmenkov as Ivan Fedoskin
- Natalya Bogunova as Svetlana Afanasyevna, literature teacher
- Natalya Gvozdikova as Polina
- Savely Kramarov as Timokhin
- Viktor Proskurin as Gena Lyapishev
- Valery Nosik as Otto Fukin
- Nina Maslova as Vika Korovyanskaya
- Iren Azer as Lyus’ka, Lyapishev’s girlfriend
- Valeri Khlevinsky as Avdotyin
- Lyudmila Kasatkina as The School Headmaster
- Mikhail Yanshin as Professor Volosyuk
- Valentina Sperantova as Auntie Glasha, the School Janitor
- Lev Durov as Militiaman, comrade st. sargeant
- Lyusyena Ovchinnikova as Valya, Petrykin's bride/wife
- Lev Dubov as Engineer
- Anastasiya Georgiyevskaya, Valentina Talyzina, Nina Zhilina, Lyudmila Antsiferova, Valentina Kuznetsova as The School Teachers
- Vladimir Basov as photographer at the Petrykin's wedding
- Elya Baskin as pupil
- Nikolai Grabbe as Tarasov
- Ivan Ryzhov as comrade Major (militia), head of the department
- Valentina Ananina (episode)
- Mikhail Remizov (episode)
- Vladimir Zemlyanikin as Petrykin's friend
- Gotlib Roninson as Brigadier
- Yelena Koreneva as a girl in library
- Valentina Titova as a wedding guest
- Pyotr Shcherbakov as a guest

== Production ==
=== Film locations ===
The film was shot in Yaroslavl (Central Park, Kotoroslnaya embankment, Damansky Island etc.) and Moscow (Moscow State Pedagogical University).

=== Music ===
External videos
- Black and White

The main song of the film is Black and White (Russian: Чёрное и белое, lit. 'Chyornoe i beloe'), sang by Svetlana Kryuchkova, written by Eduard Kolmanovsky and Mikhail Tanich specifically for her.

In the wake of the huge film success, this song became associated with Kryuchkova for many years.

== Reviews ==
Despite critical reviews, the film is considered a classic and is often shown on Russian TV channels.

Mikhail Kononov was skeptical about the film. In his memoirs, he wrote: "In the multi-series "Big School-Break", the full spectre of four generations of actors was collected, ranging from popular folk to those who had just graduated from theater schools. I had to justify phantasmagoric situations and an absurd script. A lot has been written about the "Big School-Break", and it was successfully held abroad. Such was the strength of talents in Russia at that time. Any nonsense in their performance looked cute and charming, and most importantly — sincere".
