= The Shield and the Sword (film) =

- Part 2 poster
- Directed by: Vladimir Basov
- Written by: Vladimir Basov; Vadim Kozhevnikov
- Produced by: Mosfilm
- Starring: Stanislav Lyubshin; Oleg Yankovsky; Georgy Martyniuk; Vladimir Basov; Alla Demidova
- Cinematography: Sergei Vronsky
- Music by: Veniamin Basner
- Production company: Mosfilm
- Release date: 1968
- Running time: 325 min.
- Country: Soviet Union
- Language: Russian

The Shield and the Sword (Russian: Щит и меч, romanized: Shchit i mech) is a 1968 Soviet spy movie series in four parts directed by Vladimir Basov and produced by Mosfilm. Set during World War II, it is based on a novel by Vadim Kozhevnikov, who was Secretary of the Soviet Writers' Union.

The series was highly influential in the Soviet Union, inspiring many, including Vladimir Putin, to join the KGB.

The song "Where Does the Motherland Begin?" (С чего начинается Родина, S chego nachinayetsya Rodina), sung by Mark Bernes, was the main musical theme of all the films in the series and became well known in the USSR.

== Parts ==
- Part 1. No Right To Be Themselves (Без права быть собой, Bez prava byt soboy)
- Part 2. The Order is: Survive (Приказано выжить, Prikazano vyzhit)
- Part 3. Without Appeal (Обжалованию не подлежит, Obzhalovaniyu ne podlezhit)
- Part 4. The Last Frontier (Последний рубеж, Posledniy rubezh)

== Plot ==
The year is 1940 and Nazi Germany is at the height of its military power, having captured most of Europe and eyeing the Soviet Union to the East. The Soviet military command suspects hostile intent from Germany and so arranges for its spies to infiltrate ranks of the German military and the SS. Alexander Belov (Lyubshin) is a Soviet spy, who travels from Latvian Soviet Socialist Republic to Nazi Germany under an alias of Volksdeutsche Johann Weiss. His mastery of the German language, steel nerves and an ability to manipulate others help him to use his connections in the SS to ascend the ladder of the Abwehr and then in the SD. He uses his position to identify sympathetic Germans, who help him to procure vital intelligence, and to help local resistance movements in their collective fight against Nazism.

== Cast ==
- Stanislav Lyubshin as Alexander Belov / Johann Weiss
- Oleg Yankovsky as Heinrich Schwarzkopf
- Georgy Martyniuk as Aleksey Zubov / Alois Hagen
- Vladimir Basov as Bruno
- Alla Demidova as Angelika Buecher
- Juozas Budraitis as Dietrich
- Aleksey Glazyrin as Steinglitz
- Valentina Titova as Nina
- Natalia Velichko as Elsa
- Vladimir Balashov as Sonnenberg
- Algimantas Masiulis as Willi Schwarzkopf
- Nikolai Zasukhin as Papke
- Lev Polyakov as Gerlach
- Nikolay Grabbe as Deaf-mute Man
- Yelena Dobronravova as Deaf-mute Woman
- Vatslav Dvorzhetsky as Lansdorf
- Anatoly Kubatsky as Franz
- Nikolay Prokopovich as Schulz
- Kristina Lazar as Brigitte
- Valentin Smirnitsky as Andrey Basalyga / «Faza»
- Igor Bezyayev as «Rabbit»
- Vsevolod Safonov as «Nail»
- Vladimir Marenkov as «Ace»
- German Kachin as «Cartilage»
- Igor Yasulovich as «Goga»
- Radner Muratov as «Shaman»
- Konstantin Tyrtov as «Tit»
- Sergey Plotnikov as General Baryshev
- Inga Budkevich as Inga
- Uldis Dumpis as Luftwaffe Ace
- Helga Göring as Frau Dietmar
- Horst Preusker as Prof. Stutthoff
- Wojcech Duriasz as Jerzy Czyzewski
- Kurt-Mueller Reizner as Karl Kunert
- Szilárd Bánki as Janos Molnar
- Vladimír Brabec as Jaromir Drobny
- Vladimir Osenev as Hitler
- Vyacheslav Dugin as Himmler
- Mikhail Sidorkin as Göring

== See also ==
- Seventeen Moments of Spring, a 1973 Soviet television series that portrays the exploits of a Soviet spy operating in Nazi Germany.
