= Igor Starygin =

Soviet and Russian actor (1946–2009)

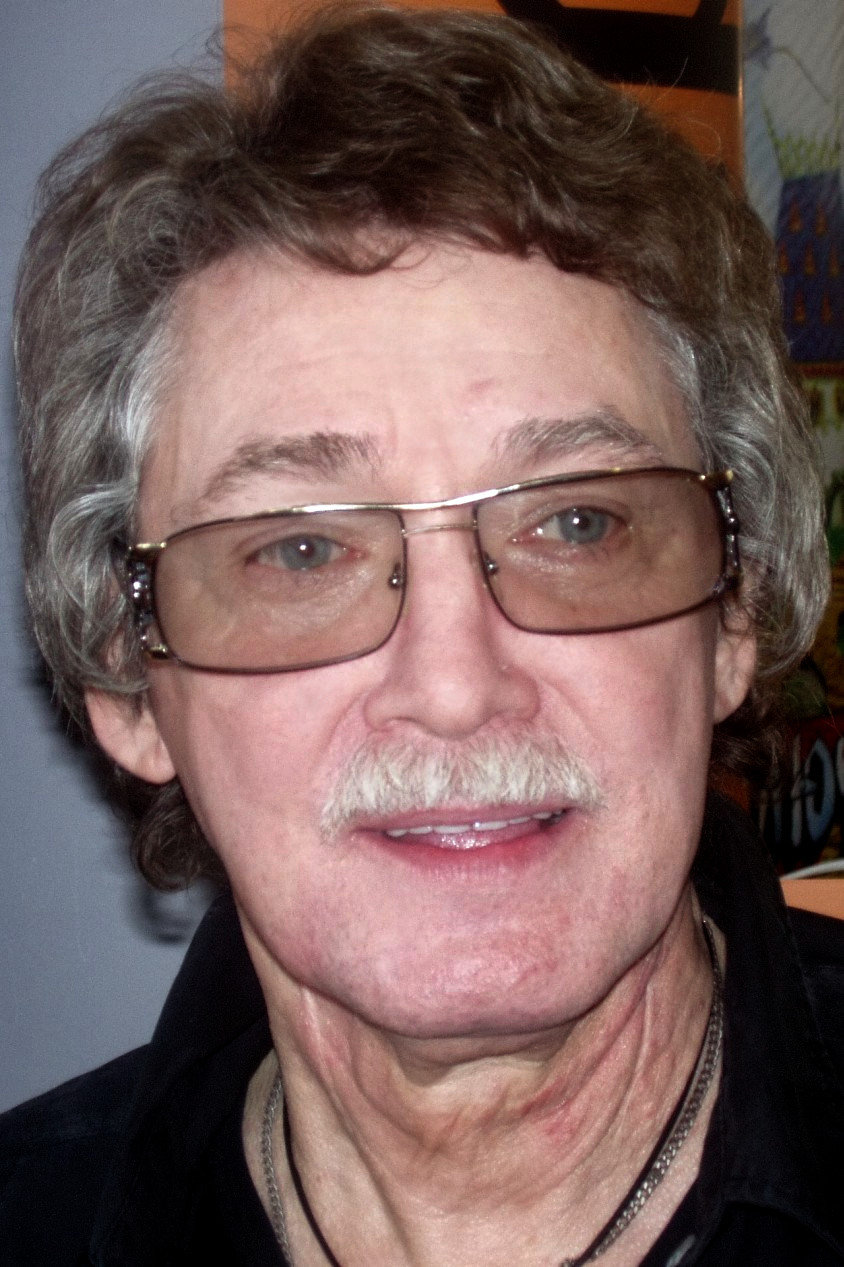
- Igor Starygin in 2008
- Born: 13 June 1946; Moscow, USSR
- Died: 8 November 2009 (aged 63); Moscow, Russia
- Occupation: actor
- Years active: 1968–2008
- Spouse(s): Lyudmila Isakova (1967–68); Mira Ardova (1970–81); Irina Purtova (1981–86); Tatiana Sukhacheva; Ekaterina Tabashnikova (2006–09)

Igor Vladimirovich Starygin (Russian:Игорь Владимирович Старыгин, 13 June 1946 in Moscow – 8 November 2009 in Moscow) was a Soviet and Russian stage and film actor.

An alumnus of the Russian Academy of Theatre Arts, Starygin had more than 40 roles in films and is most known for the role of Aramis in D'Artagnan and Three Musketeers (1979) and its sequels (1992, 1993, 2007). He had another famous role in the TV series The State Border (1980s).

Starygin also performed with the Moscow Art Theatre and the Theatre of Mossovet.

He died, aged 63, on 8 November 2009 in Moscow from complications of a stroke. Starygin was buried at Troyekurovskoye Cemetery.

== Selected filmography ==
- Revenge (Возмездие, 1967)
- We'll Live Till Monday (Доживём до понедельника, 1968)
- The Adjutant of His Excellency (Адъютант его превосходительства, 1969)
- Accused of Murder (Обвиняются в убийстве, 1969)
- Towns and Years (Города и годы, 1973)
- The Red and the Black (Красное и чёрное, 1976)
- d'Artagnan and Three Musketeers (Д’Артаньян и три мушкетёра, 1978)
- The State Border. We Will Build Our New... (Государственная граница. Мы наш, мы новый..., 1980)
- The State Border. Peaceful '21 Summer (Государственная граница. Мирное лето 21-го года, 1980)
- Moon Rainbow (Лунная радуга, 1983)
- Musketeers Twenty Years After (Мушкетёры двадцать лет спустя, 1992)
- The Secret of Queen Anne or Musketeers Thirty Years After (Тайна королевы Анны, или Мушкетёры тридцать лет спустя, 1993)
- The Return of the Musketeers, or The Treasures of Cardinal Mazarin (Возвращение мушкетёров, или Сокровища кардинала Мазарини, 2007)
