= Georgy Martyniuk =

Soviet and Russian actor (1940–2014)

- Born: Georgy Yakovlevich Martyniuk; 3 March 1940; Orenburg, Russian SFSR, Soviet Union
- Died: 13 February 2014 (aged 73); Moscow, Russia
- Occupation: Actor
- Spouses: Valentina Markova; Neelie Martyniuk

Georgy Yakovlevich Martyniuk (Russian: Георгий Яковлевич Мартынюк, IPA: [ɡʲɪˈorɡʲɪj ˈjakəvlʲɪvʲɪtɕ mərtɨˈnʲuk]; 3 March 1940 – 13 February 2014) was a Russian film and theater actor.

== Biography ==
Born in Orenburg in 1940, he graduated from the Russian Academy of Theatre Arts in 1962. In 2003, he was named People's Artist of Russia.

== Personal life ==
He was married to actress Valentina Markova until his death on 13 February 2014 in Moscow following a long illness at age 73.

== Filmography ==
Year	Title	Role	Notes
1963	At Your Threshold	wounded on the train	
1964	Silence	Konstantin Korabelnikov	
1965	The Blizzard	Burmin	
1965	There Was an Old Couple	Valentin	
1968	The Shield and the Sword	Aleksei Zubov / Alois Hagen	TV mini-series
1971-2003	Investigation Held by ZnaToKi	Major Pavel Znamensky / Znamensky	
1972	The Dawns Here Are Quiet	Luzhin, mayor	
1995	Trifles of Life	Colonel	TV series
