= Ivan Ryzhov =

Soviet and Russian actor (1913-2004)

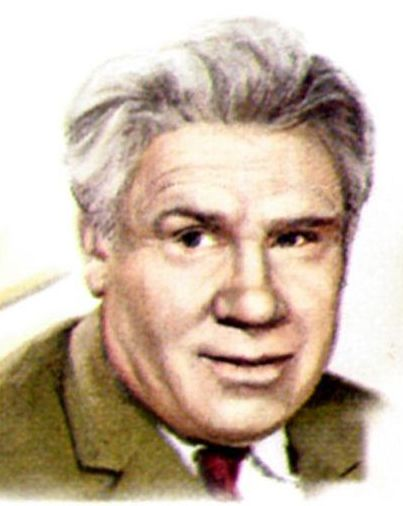
From a postcard (2013)

Ivan Petrovich Ryzhov (Russian: Ива́н Петро́вич Рыжо́в; 25 January 1913, Zelyonaya Sloboda, Bronnitsky Uyezd, Moscow Governorate — 15 March 2004, Moscow) was a Soviet and Russian film and theater actor. People's Artist of the RSFSR (1980).

== Biography ==
Ryzhov was born on 25 January 1913 in the village of Zelyonaya Sloboda, in the Bronnitsky Uyezd of the Moscow Governorate of the Russian Empire. In 1935, he graduated from the School of the Moscow Theater of the Revolution and became an actor of the theater.

He made his film debut in the role of Captain Soroka in the Kubans.

He played the main role in the first Soviet commercial.

Ivan Ryzhov died on the morning of 15 March 2004 in a Moscow hospital. According to his daughter, it happened due to negligence of the medical staff: the actor had fallen and cut his hand. The funeral service took place not in the House of Cinema, as has happened with other famous actors, but in a small temple at Botkin Hospital, where he had died. The memorial was attended by relatives and artists.

He was buried at Perepechinskoe Cemetery.

== Awards ==
- Honored Artist of the RSFSR (4 September 1974)
- People's Artist of the RSFSR (25 July 1980)
- Order of the Red Banner of Labour (30 April 1991) — for his merits in the development of Soviet cinematic art

== Select filmography ==
- 1943 — We from the Urals as Ivan Dmitrievich
- 1944 — Kashchey the Immortal as naughty boy
- 1947 — Ballad of Siberia as on duty at the airport and lumberjacks
- 1953 — Hostile Whirlwinds as soldier
- 1956 — Ilya Muromets as head of horse guards
- 1956 — A Weary Road as gendarme
- 1957 — It Happened in Penkovo as farmer
- 1958 — And Quiet Flows the Don as head of horse guards
- 1959 — Mumu as Gavrila
- 1959 — Tavriya as Mokeich
- 1961 — Yevdokiya as Ivan Yegorovich Shestyorkin
- 1964 — Come Here, Mukhtar! as militia captain
- 1964 — There Is Such a Lad as head of tank farms
- 1964 — Tale About the Lost Time as foreman at a construction site
- 1966 — Andrei Rublev as old master (voice)
- 1967 — Stewardess as passengers with baby toys
- 1970 — Crime and Punishment as Tit Vasilievich
- 1972 — Taming of the Fire as Alekseich
- 1972 — Big School-Break as head of the police station
- 1972 — Ilf and Petrov Rode a Tram as Chief Editor
- 1972 — Chipollino as Master Raisin (voice)
- 1973 — Hopelessly Lost as Boggs
- 1973 — The Red Snowball Tree as Fyodor
- 1973 — Incorrigible Liar as senior master
- 1974 — A Lover's Romance as Vasily Vasilievich
- 1976 — How Czar Peter the Great Married Off His Moor as Gavrilo Afanasievich Rtishchev
- 1976 — The Days of the Turbins as footman Fyodor
- 1977 — White Bim Black Ear as Pal Titych, house manager
- 1983 — Quarantine as Petrovich
- 1988 — Tree Sticks! as granddad
- 1994 — Life and Extraordinary Adventures of Private Ivan Chonkin as Shapkin
- 1995 — Heads and Tails as Timofeich
