= Lethargy (film) =

1983 Soviet film

- Russian poster
- Russian: Летаргия
- Directed by: Valeriy Lonskoy
- Written by: Valeriy Lonskoy; Vladimir Zheleznikov
- Starring: Andrey Myagkov; Natalya Sayko; Valentina Panina; Rimma Korostelyova; Vasiliy Bochkaryov
- Cinematography: Anatoliy Ivanov
- Music by: Isaac Schwarts
- Production company: Mosfilm
- Release date: 1983
- Running time: 92 minutes
- Country: Soviet Union
- Language: Russian

Lethargy (Russian: Летаргия) is a 1983 Soviet drama film directed by Valeriy Lonskoy.

The film tells the story of a disillusioned scientist, whose career and personal life are shattered by betrayal. He undergoes a profound awakening through a series of personal losses and self-reflective acts of courage.

== Plot ==
A young scientist, Bekasov, works at a research institute in Moscow, where his groundbreaking work is stolen by his father-in-law, one of the institute's directors. While everyone knows the work is Bekasov's, they do nothing, and even his wife—loyal to her father—leaves him. He had previously left his first wife and daughter in a small town to marry her.

Bekasov begins to live solely for himself, shown through a series of introspective episodes. However, life forces him to reevaluate his choices: his mother's death, a poignant conversation with his now-grown daughter, and a plea for help from a dying woman all lead to his awakening. The climax occurs when he rushes to meet a woman he loves, defending a stranger on a train from drunk harassers along the way. This brave act marks his full return to empathy and universal values.

== Cast ==
- Andrey Myagkov as Bekasov
- Natalya Sayko as Olya
- Valentina Panina as Lida
- Rimma Korostelyova as Masha
- Vasiliy Bochkaryov as Mikhail Platonovich
- Sergei Dityatev as Fokin (as S. Dityatev)
- Igor Vladimirov as Obolensky (as I. Vladimirov)
- Viktor Filippov as Dadashev (as V. Filippov)
- Anna Varpakhovskaya as Zhenya (as A. Varpakhovskaya)
- Sergey Nikonenko as Golovin (as S. Nikonenko)
