= Crime and Punishment (1970 film) =

1970 film by Lev Kulidzhanov

- Theatrical release poster
- Directed by: Lev Kulidzhanov
- Written by: Lev Kulidzhanov; Nikolai Figurovsky
- Based on: Crime and Punishment; 1866 novel by Fyodor Dostoevsky
- Starring: Georgy Taratorkin; Innokenty Smoktunovsky; Tatyana Bedova; Victoria Fyodorova
- Cinematography: Vyacheslav Shumsky
- Edited by: Mariya Rodionova
- Music by: Mikhail Ziv
- Production company: Gorky Film Studio
- Release date: 1969
- Running time: 221 minutes
- Country: Soviet Union
- Language: Russian

Crime and Punishment (Russian: Преступление и наказание) is a 1969 Soviet drama film in two parts directed by Lev Kulidzhanov, based on the eponymous 1866 novel by Fyodor Dostoevsky.

== Plot ==
Rodion Raskolnikov, an impoverished former law student, kills an old pawnbroker and, unexpectedly, her innocent sister, partly to obtain money and partly to test his theory that “extraordinary men” are above the moral constraints that bind ordinary people. Although he attempts to evade suspicion, Raskolnikov comes to the attention of the police through standard investigation procedures, since he was a regular client of the victim. However, his erratic behavior and defensive outbursts soon attract the interest of the clever detective Porfiry Petrovich, who suspects Raskolnikov of the crime. Meanwhile, Raskolnikov’s life grows increasingly turbulent as his mother and sister arrive in the city, followed by two older suitors competing for his sister’s hand in marriage. Adding to his inner turmoil, Raskolnikov meets a drunken clerk who dies in an accident, leaving behind a daughter, Sonia, a young woman forced into prostitution to support her family.

As Raskolnikov spirals deeper into guilt and paranoia, his interactions with Sonia become a lifeline. Her selfless kindness and faith offer him a glimmer of redemption, and she ultimately convinces him to confess, promising to stand by him even if he is exiled to Siberia. Haunted by fear and moral conflict, Raskolnikov finally surrenders to the authorities, admitting his crime, with Sonia at his side as his hope for spiritual salvation.

== Cast ==
- Georgy Taratorkin as Rodion Romanovich Raskolnikov
- Innokenty Smoktunovsky as Porfiry Petrovitch
- Tatyana Bedova as Sonya Marmeladova
- Victoria Fyodorova as Avdotya Romanovna
- Yefim Kopelyan as Svidrigailov
- Yevgeni Lebedev as Marmeladov
- Maya Bulgakova as Yekaterina Ivanovna
- Irina Gosheva as Pulkheriya Aleksandrovna
- Vladimir Basov as Luzhin
- Aleksandr Pavlov as Razumikhin
- Vladimir Belokurov as Innkeeper
- Inna Makarova as Nastasya
- Sergei Nikonenko as Nikolai
- Valery Nosik as Zametov
- Dzidra Ritenberga as Luiza Ivanovna
- Ivan Ryzhov as Tit Vasilievich
- Yuri Sarantsev as Lieutenant 'Powder'
- Lyubov Sokolova as Yelizaveta
- Vladimir Nosik as tavern servant
