= Moscow Pushkin Drama Theatre =

Russian theater company

- Московский драматический театр имени А. С. Пушкина
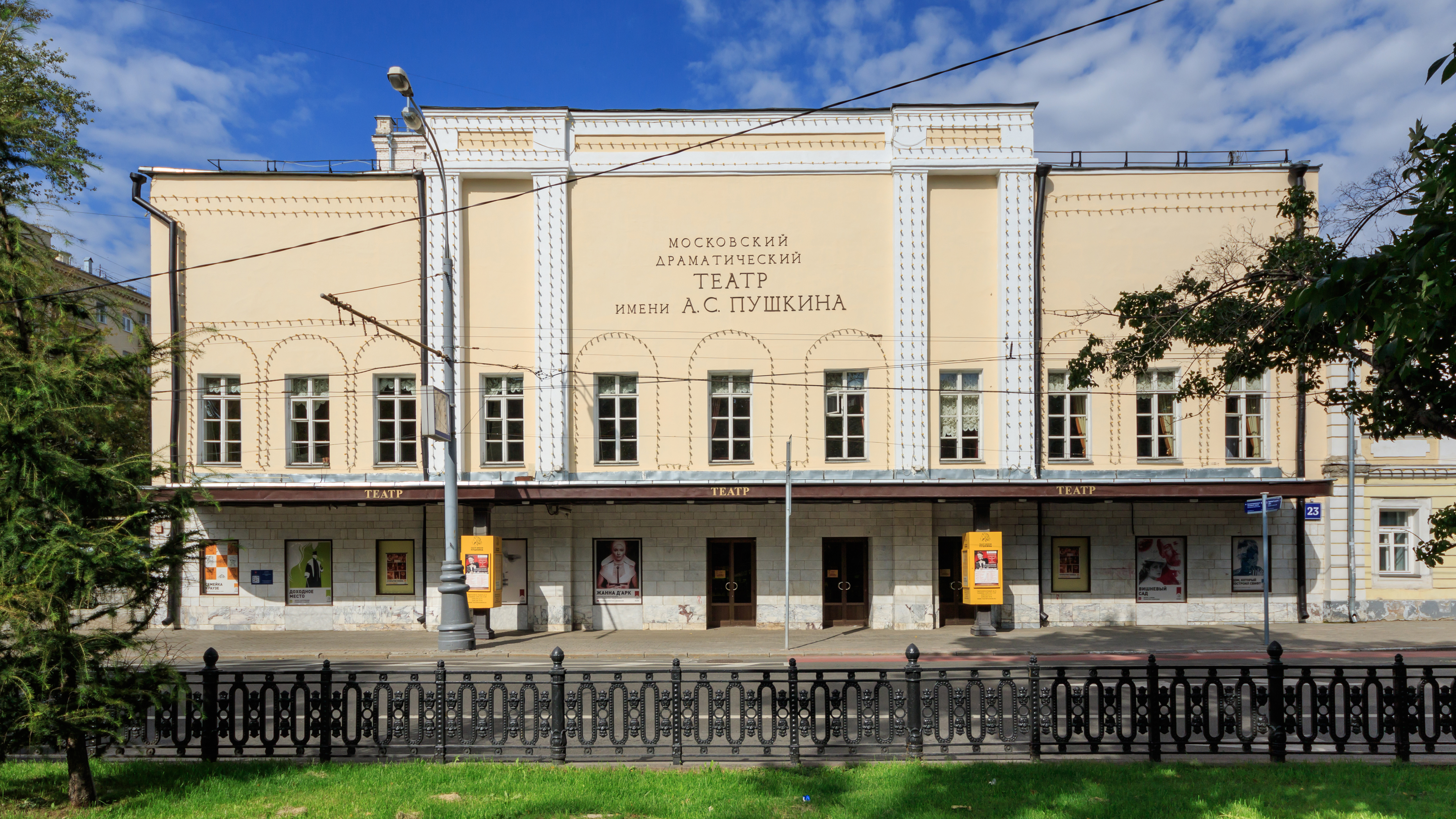
- Moscow Pushkin Drama Theatre, August 2016
- Interactive map of Moscow Pushkin Drama Theatre
- Address: Tverskoy Boulevard, 23; Moscow; Russia
- Coordinates: 55°45′44″N 37°36′05″E

Construction
- Opened: 1914 (as Kamerny Theatre)
- Reopened: 1950 (as Moscow Pushkin Drama Theatre)
- Years active: 1950–present

Website
- https://teatrpushkin.ru

The Moscow Pushkin Drama Theatre is a theatre company in Moscow, Russia, founded in 1950 on the basis of Alexander Tairov's Chamber Theatre, which was founded in 1914 and shut down in 1949 for ideological reasons. The theatre is based in the Russian capital's centre, at 23 Tverskoy Boulevard.

== Background ==
The history of the Pushkin Drama Theatre goes back to 1914 when still relatively unknown Alexander Tairov was looking for a site for his new theatre. As the actress Alisa Koonen suggested a large house on Tverskoy, Tairov initially found it unsuitable before coming up with the idea of reconstruction, which was soon implemented into a project by the architect N.Morozov. The Chamber Theatre opened on December 12, 1914, with the production of traditional Sanskrit play Shakuntala. Problems emerged when the Russian Orthodox Church authorities expressed disapproval of the theatre's closeness to the Ioann Bogoslov Cathedral; the conflict proved to be lasting one, but did get resolved. In the 1930s the building was reconstructed (according to architects Konstantin Melnikov and the Stenberg brothers) although not as radically as Tairov wanted. The facade was simplified and became very modest looking. In 1949 the Chamber Theatre was closed, for "aestheticism and formalism", according to the official statement, as a result of the Zhdanov doctrine being put into practice.

== History ==
In 1950, based on the former Kamerny Theatre, the Pushkin Drama Theatre emerged with a Soviet actor Vasili Vanin at the helm. Vanin, the Stalin Prize three times laureate, declared his allegiance to the Russian classics and contemporary Soviet drama and started out by staging "From a Spark", Shalva Dadiani's 1937 play about the youth of Stalin. It was followed by Stolen Happiness (Ukradennoye stchastye), by Ivan Franko. Highly popular was Vanin's version of Krechinsky's Wedding by Aleksandr Sukhovo-Kobylin in which he played Rasplyuev. This role happened to be Vanin's last: in 1952 he died.

He was succeeded by Boris Babochkin (1952–1953); in this period was the most popular production Shadows after Mikhail Saltykov-Shchedrin's play directed by Aleksei Dikiy. Then came Iosif Tumanov (1953–1960); his best remembered production was Anton Checkov's Ivanov, starring Boris Ivanov. In 1960 Boris Ravenskikh arrived, formulating his directorial credo as "trying to wake up a poet in every man." Comedy and romanticism became the order of the day: his bright, emotional productions used music to the full effect and is now seen as a reflection of the social optimism brought about by the Sixties Thaw.

Among the Pushkin Theatre other leaders were Boris Tolmazov (1971–1978), Alexey Govorukho (1978–1983), Boris Morozov (1983–1987), Yuri Yeryomin (1987–2000) and Roman Kozak (2001–2010). Its current head is Yevgeny Pisarev.

== Troupe ==
=== Past ===
- Marina Kuznetsova (1948– )
- Vasili Vanin (1950–1951)
- Mikhail Nazvanov (1950–1957)
- Aleksei Dikiy (1952–1955)
- Boris Babochkin (1952–1953)
- Faina Ranevskaya (1955–1963)
- Zinaida Kiriyenko (1958–1959)
- Vladimir Vysotsky (1960–1962)
- Leonid Markov (1960–1965)
- Vladimir Rautbart (1960–1963)
- Evgeny Shutov (1960–1963)
- Yuri Gorobets (196онЗ1–1971)
- Lev Barashkov (1961–1966)
- Alexey Loktev (1962–1972)
- Vladimir Safronov (1962–1972)
- Afanasy Kochetkov (1962–1979)
- Valentin Abramov (1963–1976)
- Oleg Borisov (1963–1964)
- Valery Nosik (1965–1972)
- Alexander Porokhovshchikov (1981–2012)
- Georgy Burkov (1984–1987)
- Roman Kozak (2001–2010)
- Nikolai Fomenko (2006–2010)
- Vera Alentova (1965—2025)
