= Professor Dowell's Testament =

- Russian: Завещание профессора Доуэля
- Directed by: Leonid Menaker
- Written by: Leonid Menaker; Igor Vinogradsky
- Starring: Olgert Kroders; Igor Vasiliev; Valentina Titova; Natalya Sayko
- Cinematography: A. Gorkov
- Edited by: Irina Rudenko
- Music by: Sergei Baneevich
- Production company: Lenfilm
- Release date: 1984
- Running time: 87 minutes
- Country: Soviet Union
- Language: Russian

Professor Dowell's Testament (Russian: Завещание профессора Доуэля, romanized: Zaveschanie professora Douelya) is a 1984 Soviet science fiction drama film directed by Leonid Menaker, loosely based on the 1925 novel Professor Dowell's Head by Alexander Belyaev.

== Plot ==
Professor Dowell creates a solution to reanimate body parts and later dies of an extensive myocardial infarction. In his will, the professor asks to revive him with the solution. Assistant Professor Dr. Korn connects the professor's head to the solution, and leaves the body in the car, ignites the car and throws it off the road outside the city.

Arthur, son of the professor, comes to the funeral of his father. In a charred car, Arthur discovers an object belonging to Dr. Korn, and gives it to the district police officer as evidence. The professor's head informs Dr. Korn of the code from the bank account of the professor, and Korn is able to pay off his debts.

The police tries to detain drug traffickers in a restaurant; as a result of the shootout, two women are killed. The pathologist writes out the death certificates of two women and passes the bodies to Dr. Korn. Korn connects the head from one body to the body from the other, the woman named Eva and revives with the help of the professor's solution. The head of Eva belonged to a singer who came for a tour, and the body to Arthur's girlfriend. Korn wants to learn how to create the life-giving solution; The professor's head is against this and twice gives Korn the wrong formula.

The son of the professor sees Eva, suspects Dr. Korn in the murder of the professor and gives the district photos of Eva. The police conducts an investigative experiment - a car similar to the professor's car, was dropped from the road with a doll at the wheel. Korn is charged with killing the professor. Korn has to show the head of the professor to the district chief, and the charges of murder are dropped.

At a conference of physicians, Dr. Korn demonstrates Eva, and the professor's head appears with the help of video conferencing. The head of the professor does not give Korn the formula of the solution and dies as the supply of the solution made by the professor during his lifetime ends; the same fate awaits Eva. The secret of the life-giving solution remains unsolved.

== Cast ==
- Olgert Kroders - Professor Dowell
- Igor Vasiliev - Dr. Robert Korn
- Valentina Titova - Marie Laurent
- Natalya Sayko - Angelika, Monika, Eva
- Alexei Bobrov - Arthur Dowell (voiced by Yuri Demic)
- Nikolai Lavrov - police officer Baxter
- Aleksandr Porokhovshchikov
- Ernst Romanov - Richardson
- Boris Tsymba - Willie

== Production ==
The film was initially planned to be a television series.

== Reception ==
A.V. Fedorov criticized the film and its changes from the novel, saying it "failed to escape becoming a kind of exercise in campy exoticism" and arguing that its change in location from pre-war Europe to 1980s Africa lessened the film's historical meaning, in addition to calling the film "needlessly draw[n] out". He did compliment the acting of Olgert Kroders.

== See also ==
- Isolated brain
- The Brain That Wouldn't Die
- The Brain
