= The Blizzard (1964 film) =

1964 film by Vladimir Basov

- DVD cover
- Directed by: Vladimir Basov
- Written by: Vladimir Basov
- Based on: The Blizzard by Alexander Pushkin
- Starring: Oleg Vidov; Valentina Titova; Georgy Martyniuk
- Narrated by: Yakov Smolenskiy
- Cinematography: Sergei Vronsky
- Music by: Georgy Sviridov
- Production company: Mosfilm
- Release date: 1964
- Running time: 80 minutes
- Country: Soviet Union
- Language: Russian

The Blizzard (Russian: Метель) is a 1964 Soviet film directed by Vladimir Basov, based on the 1831 story "The Blizzard" from The Belkin Tales by Alexander Pushkin.

== Plot ==
Marya Gavrilovna R... was brought up on French novels. She was in love with Vladimir, a poor praporshchik. However, Maria's parents disapproved of her daughter's choice. But this does not stop Maria Gavrilovna, and she and Vladimir decide to run away, secretly get married and wait for their parents to bless them. Marya Gavrilovna wrote a letter to her parents and left. But, having arrived to get married, she feels unwell. And Vladimir, having left on a horse-drawn sleigh, loses his way due to a strong snowstorm and arrives very late, already in the morning. By that time, the church was empty: Marya Gavrilovna was mistakenly married to some other officer who happened to be in this church by chance; during the ceremony, she notices the substitution and faints, and the newly-made "husband" hastily retreats. Returning home, Masha burns the letter, after which she falls ill and is "at the edge of the coffin" for two weeks. Vladimir no longer makes attempts to meet Masha, believing that he is unworthy of her, and soon goes to the French invasion of Russia, where he heroically dies. About three years after the beginning of the story, a 26-year-old colonel Burmin appears in the entourage of Marya Gavrilovna (her father has already died by that time, making her daughter the heir to the estate), Marya Gavrilovna falls in love with him and in the scene of the explanation learns that he is the same officer with whom she once married, and that he also has tender feelings for her.

== Cast ==
- Valentina Titova – Maria Gavrilovna
- Oleg Vidov – Vladimir
- Georgy Martyniuk – Burmin
- Mariya Pastukhova – Praskovya Petrovna
- Sergei Papov – Gavrila Gavrilovich
- Nina Vilvovskaya – Maid
- Anatoli Ignatyev – Dranov
- Nikolai Prokopovich – Schmitt
- Nikolai Burlyayev – Lancer
- Sergey Plotnikov – Priest
