= Tax Collector (film) =

- Russian: Мытарь
- Directed by: Oleg Fomin
- Written by: Ivan Okhlobystin
- Produced by: Sergey Chliyants; Evgeniy Ulyushkin
- Starring: Oleg Fomin; Anna Molchanova; Mikhail Gluzsky; Aleksandr Porokhovshchikov; Andrei Bubashkin
- Cinematography: Igor Klebanov
- Music by: Artyom Artemyev
- Release date: 1997
- Country: Russia
- Language: Russian

Tax Collector (Russian: Мытарь) is a 1997 Russian crime thriller film directed by Oleg Fomin.

== Plot ==
He is a tax collector and sees the future. He is sent to one place where the impossible must be completed and he copes with the task until she appears. He has to make a difficult choice.

== Cast ==
- Oleg Fomin as He
- Anna Molchanova as She
- Mikhail Gluzsky as Bayun, Witch doctor
- Aleksandr Porokhovshchikov as Potocky
- Andrei Bubashkin as Sedoy
- Juozas Budraitis as Oleg Aleksandrovich
- Vladimir Sichkar as Auctioneer
- Aleksandr Timoshkin as Valentin
- Aleksey Zharkov as Novitskiy
- Vitaliy Bykov as Secretary
