= East Corridor =

- Russian: Восточный коридор
- Directed by: Valentin Vinogradov
- Starring: Lyudmila Abramova; Regimantas Adomaitis; Valentina Aslanova; Gleb Glebov; Boris Markov; Yelena Rysina; Valentina Titova
- Cinematography: Yuri Marukhin
- Music by: Eduard Khagagortyan; Mikael Tariverdiev
- Production company: Belarusfilm
- Release date: 1966
- Running time: 100 min.
- Country: Soviet Union
- Language: Russian

East Corridor (Russian: Восточный коридор, romanized: Vostochny koridor) is a 1966 Soviet war film directed by Valentin Vinogradov.

The film takes place during the Second World War. The film tells about the Belarusian underground, which the Nazis are trying to set against each other.

== Plot ==
The story unfolds during the Second World War in a Nazi-occupied Belarusian city, focusing on the resistance efforts of local underground fighters. In a prison basement, Ivan Lobach is brought into a cell filled with captured partisans. Through flashbacks, the events leading to his capture are revealed. As partisans in the forest face starvation, underground operatives in the city plan a bold operation to seize grain from a warehouse and deliver it to the forest. Ivan and his comrade Ales Dubovik are tasked with the mission, but Dubovik is arrested and fails to meet Ivan. Suspicions arise that Ivan has defected, prompting the group to order his lover, Zhenya, to kill him. However, when Ivan returns, Zhenya cannot carry out the order. They witness Dubovik publicly denounce the resistance under Nazi pressure, inciting a chaotic revolt among the crowd. Determined to prove his loyalty, Ivan sets out to uncover the truth about Dubovik's supposed betrayal.

Ivan collaborates with fellow resistance member Ziazyula, securing a letter written by Dubovik from a local pro-Nazi newspaper editor. Under the guise of submitting material for publication, Ivan retrieves the letter but is forced to kill the editor when he tries to escape. Ziazyula is arrested, but Ivan continues his work with other resistance members, including the artist Lyudmila and her sculptor husband Yegor. While Lyudmila paints portraits of German officers as a cover, Yegor's open disdain for the Nazis leads to his imprisonment. Despite torture and manipulation by the prison commander, Yegor refuses to betray his comrades. Meanwhile, Ivan attempts to save the Jewish scholar Grommer and his daughter Freda from an impending massacre. Though he initially succeeds in escorting them to the forest, they are captured, witnessing the horrifying drowning of hundreds of Jews.

As the resistance fights on, their leader Konstantin takes charge of the grain operation, successfully delivering supplies to the starving partisans. In the prison, Freda aids Ivan in an escape attempt, but he is killed during the effort. Other prisoners, including Zhenya, face brutal treatment, but she manages to flee with the help of a friend, using a clever ruse involving her friend's child. The story culminates in tragic sacrifices and fleeting moments of defiance, painting a harrowing picture of courage, betrayal, and resilience in the face of overwhelming oppression.

== Cast ==
- Lyudmila Abramova as Lena
- Regimantas Adomaitis as Ivan
- Valentina Aslanova as Zhenya
- Gleb Glebov as Zyazyulya
- Boris Markov as Yegor
- Yelena Rysina as Freda
- Valentina Titova as Lyudmila
- Vladimir Kashpur as Konstantin
