= The Blizzard =

1830 short story by Alexander Pushkin

"The Blizzard" (or The Snow Storm) (Russian: Мете́ль, Metél' ) is the second of five short stories that constitute The Belkin Tales by Alexander Pushkin. The manuscript for the story was originally completed October 20, 1830. It was intended to be the last of The Belkin Tales to be published, but Pushkin decided to push the story to the front of the volume. The novella, so comical and at the same time so dramatic, is considered to be one of the masterpieces of Russian literature.

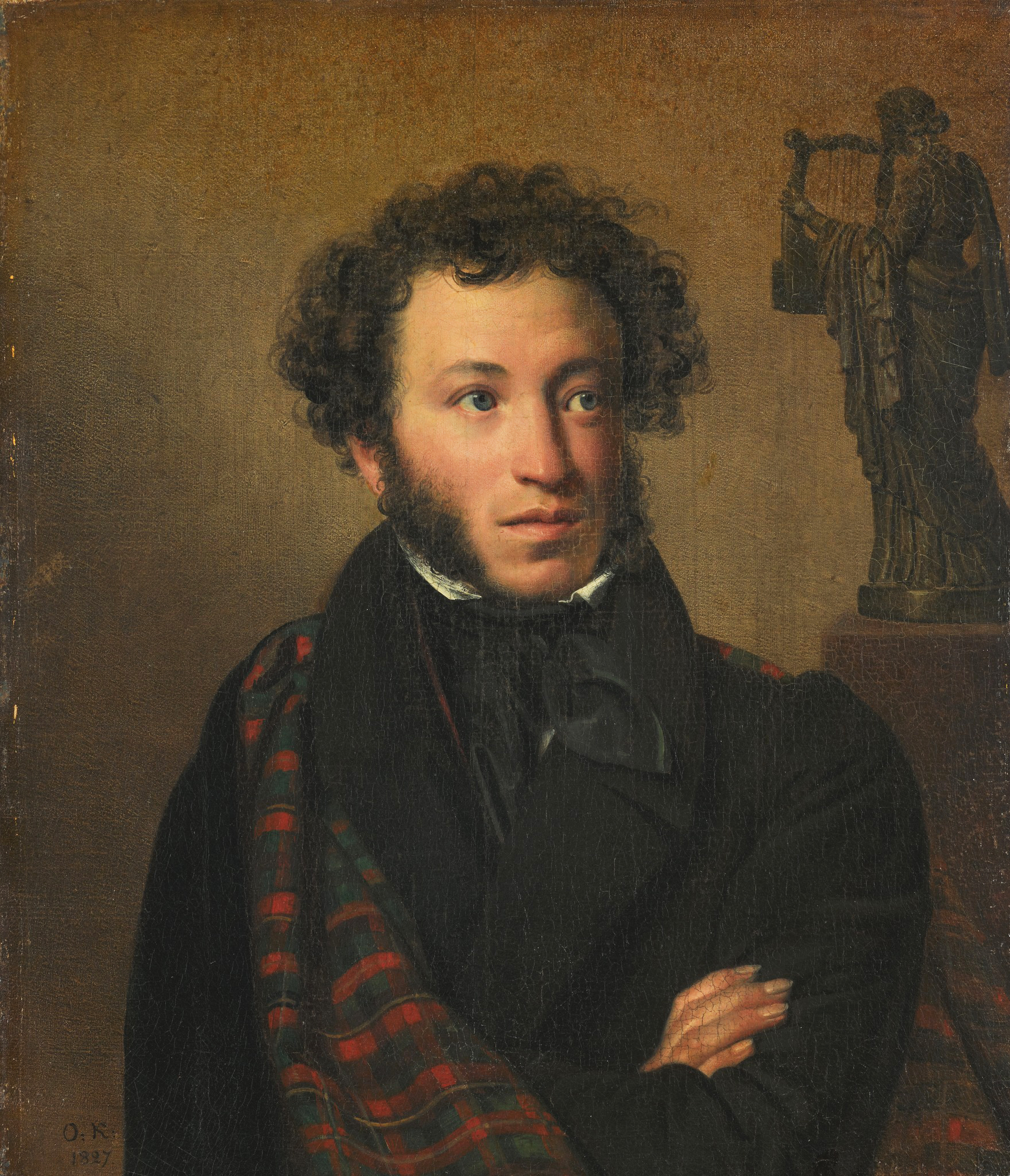
Portrait of Alexander Pushkin (Orest Kiprensky, 1827)

== Plot ==
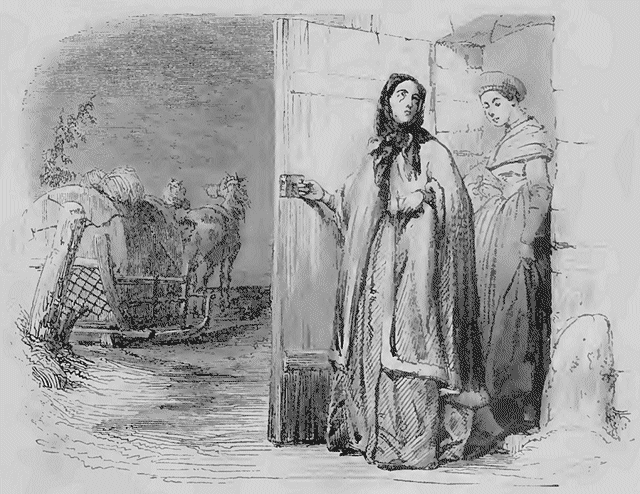
Illustration accompanying the French edition of the story, ca. 1843

The plot concerns the relationships of an aristocratic young woman named Maria Gavrilovna (Gavrilovna is a patronymic, not a surname) and the unusual coincidences that accompany them. The following is copied from the program notes by Ledbetter (see sources):

In 1811, a seventeen-year-old girl, Maria Gavrilovna, falls in love with a young officer, Vladimir Nikolayevich. Her parents disapprove of the relationship, which continues into the winter through correspondence. Finally they decide to elope, marry quickly, and then throw themselves at the feet of her parents to beg forgiveness (confident that a marriage entered into the Russian Orthodox Church would be regarded as eternal and unbreakable).

The plan was for Maria Gavrilovna to slip out in the middle of a winter's night and take a sleigh to a distant village church, where her love would meet her for the wedding. On the night in question, a blizzard was raging, but the girl managed to do all she had promised and to reach the church. Her lover, on the other hand, driving alone to the rendezvous, became lost in the dark and the storm, arriving at the church many hours late to find no one there.

The next morning, Masha was once more at home, but very ill. In a feverish delirium, she said enough to make it clear to her mother that she was hopelessly in love with the young officer. Her parents, deciding that this was a fated love, gave their permission for a wedding. But when they wrote to inform the officer of this fact, his reply was almost incoherent. He begged their forgiveness and insisted that his only hope was death. He rejoined the army (it was now the fatal year of 1812, when Napoleon made his famous attack on Russia), was wounded at the battle of Borodino, and died.

Meanwhile, Masha's father died, leaving her the richest young woman in her region. Suitors pressed for her hand, but she refused to accept anyone. She seemed to be living only for the memory of her lost love.

Finally, though, she made the acquaintance of a wounded colonel of the hussars, Burmin, who was visiting the estate near hers. Burmin was a handsome man who had once had a reputation as a notorious rake, but who was now both quiet and modest in his personality. The two developed a warm friendship, and it became very clear that he was so restrained that he never made any declaration of love or formal proposal to her. Masha purposely arranged a situation in which they would be able to talk freely with no one else near. Finally he breaks his silence: He loves her passionately but cannot hope for any happiness with her because he is already married, has been married for four years, to a woman whom he does not know and whom he cannot expect ever to see again.

To the astonished Masha, he explains that, in the winter of 1812, he was trying to rejoin his regiment, when a terrible blizzard came on. Riding in a troika with a guide, they became lost in unfamiliar country. Seeing a light in the distance, they drove toward it and found themselves at a village church where people were crying out "This way!" When he stopped at the church, he was told that the bride had fainted and that the priest did not know what to do. When they saw the young soldier, they asked him if he was ready to proceed. Burmin, the young rake, noticed the attractiveness of the bride and decided to play a prank by going through with the ceremony. The church was dark, lit only by a few candles, and everyone in it was little more than a shadow. When, at the end, he was told to kiss his bride, she realized that it was not her intended and fainted dead away. As the witnesses stared at him in horror, he raced out and drove off.

He explains to Masha that he was so thoroughly lost that he still does not know the name of the village where he was married, or who the bride might have been. As the tale ends, Maria Gavrilovna takes the hand of the man she has come to love and identifies herself as the long-lost bride.

== Style ==
Pushkin uses his story as a means of parody on the classical themes of gothic motivation featured in Gottfried August Bürger's Lenore and Vasily Zhukovsky's Svetlana. In these ballads, the protagonists are only able to dream and 'imagine' life with their deceased lovers. Pushkin plays on this idea by presenting the same situation for Marya; however, due to a case of most fortuitous and unforeseen circumstances Marya is actually married to her living lover. Pushkin imitates the style of these ballads, but creates it through a set of realistic circumstances.

== Themes ==
=== Hero ===
In The Belkin Tales, Pushkin uses a variety of stereotyped gentlemen suitors as the tales' hero. Burmin acts as the hero in this short story. His wild and borderline criminal behaviour towards marrying an unknown bride in the church ultimately led him to marrying the woman of his dreams.

=== Antihero ===
Vladimir is the story's counter or antihero. Being a petty land owner, he is too poor to pursue Masha's hand in marriage openly. Vladimir's plans for marriage were brought to a halt by unfortunate circumstances (the blizzard, fatal injury during the war). However, the same unfortunate events are what grant Burmin the ability to lead a successful courtship with Maria.

== Structure ==
Over seventy percent of the sentences within the story are considered to be a simple sentence, which includes segments of simple sentences cut short by a semicolon. The story's plot can be dissected into 13 unique parts:

1. The two lovers are presented, along with their situation and plans to wed
2. Maria makes her preparations to leave and spend her last moments at home
3. Vladimir leaves and departs through the snowstorm to the church
4. Maria falls ill at her home and professes her love to her parents
5. Vladimir's refuses to enter Maria's home and enlists in the military
6. The state of Maria and Vladimir's injury and death from the Battle of Borodino
7. Death of Masha's father and her departure to a new estate
8. Describes Maria's faith to the memory of her dead lover
9. A degression to the current state of affairs in Russia
10. Burmin arrives and the feelings between Masha and Burmin is established
11. Burmin's declaration of love
12. Burmin's role in the events that occurred during the Blizzard when Masha and Vladimir were supposed to elope
13. Brief explanation of events

== Adaptations ==
=== Film ===
The story was made into a film by director Vladimir Basov. The film's soundtrack was written by Georgy Sviridov, who later modified the soundtrack into a musical suite of the same name.

=== Musical ===
Georgy Sviridov's suite (Musical illustrations to Alexander Pushkin's story), while mostly unknown in the Americas, is very popular in Russia. Based on the film score that he wrote for Basov's film, the movements of the suite are as follows:

1. Troika
2. Valse
3. Spring - Autumn
4. Romance
5. Pastorale
6. Little Military March
7. Wedding
8. Echo of the Valse
9. Finale

== Bibliography ==
- Bethea, David M., and Sergei Davydov. “Pushkin's Saturnine Cupid: The Poetics of Parody in the Tales of Belkin”. PMLA 96.1 (1981): 9-10. Web.
- Debreczeny, Paul. The Other Pushkin: A Study of Alexander Pushkin's Prose Fiction. Stanford, CA: Stanford UP, 1983. 80 & 94. Print.
- Gregg, Richard. “A Scapegoat for All Seasons: The Unity and the Shape of the Tales of Belkin”. Slavic Review 30.4 (1971): 749–751. Web.
- Ledbetter, Steven: Program Notes for concert by MIT Symphony Orchestra, 9 Dec. 2005.
- Ward, Dennis. “The Structure of Pushkin's 'tales of Belkin'”. The Slavonic and East European Review 33.81 (1955): 520–521. Web.
