= Georgy Rerberg =

Soviet cinematographer

- Born: Georgy Ivanovich Rerberg; 28 September 1937; Moscow, Soviet Union
- Died: 28 July 1999 (aged 61); Moscow, Russia
- Resting place: Vvedenskoye Cemetery
- Years active: 1965–1997
- Title: People’s Artist of the RSFSR (1988)
- Spouse: Valentina Titova.
- Awards: Vasilyev Brothers State Prize of the RSFSR (1990)

Georgy Ivanovich Rerberg (Russian: Георгий Иванович Рерберг, September 28, 1937, Moscow, Soviet Union, – July 28, 1999, Moscow, Russia) was a Soviet cinematographer.

He is known for his work on Andrey Tarkovsky's Mirror. He was initially the cinematographer for Andrey Tarkovsky's film Stalker but was later replaced by Alexander Knyazhinsky.

Rerberg's notable portfolio of two dozen films includes works by world-renowned Russian directors such as Andrei Konchalovsky, Andrei Tarkovsky, Igor Talankin, Sergei Solovyov, Ivan Dykhovichny, and Abderrahmane Sissako.

Georgy Rerberg was the grandson of the Russian civil engineer and architect Ivan Rerberg.

== Selected filmography ==
- The First Teacher (1965)
- The Story of Asya Klyachina (1966)
- A Nest of Gentry (1969)
- Uncle Vanya (1970)
- Ilf and Petrov Rode a Tram (1972)
- The Mirror (1975)
- Melodies of a White Night (1976)
- Father Sergius (1978)
- Stalker (1979)
- Time for Rest from Saturday to Monday (1984)
- Plumbum, or The Dangerous Game (1987)
- Octobre (1993)
