= Hopelessly Lost =

- DVD cover
- Directed by: Georgiy Daneliya
- Screenplay by: Georgiy Daneliya; Viktoriya Tokareva
- Based on: Adventures of Huckleberry Finn by Mark Twain
- Starring: Roman Madyanov; Vladimir Basov; Feliks Imokuede; Vladimir Ivashov; Vakhtang Kikabidze; Evgeni Leonov
- Cinematography: Vadim Yusov
- Edited by: Tatyana Egorycheva
- Music by: Andrei Petrov
- Distributed by: Mosfilm
- Release date: 27 August 1973
- Running time: 98 minutes
- Country: Soviet Union
- Language: Russian

Hopelessly Lost (Russian: Совсем пропащий, romanized: Sovsem propashchiy) is a 1973 Soviet adventure film directed by Georgiy Daneliya, who also adapted the script based on Mark Twain's 1884 novel Adventures of Huckleberry Finn, with cinematography by Vadim Yusov. It was entered into the 1974 Cannes Film Festival.

== Plot ==
The story follows young Huck Finn and his friend, Jim, an escaped enslaved man. Huck once lived with his father, a vagrant and drunkard who soon abandoned him. Authorities then placed Huck with the kind widow Douglas, who taught him good manners and provided him with a stable life. However, Huck's father returns to town, demanding $300 for his son, and, upon being refused, kidnaps Huck and locks him in a shack by the Mississippi River, hoping for ransom. Huck secretly cuts an escape route through the wall and plans to flee. His father, upon learning that neither the widow nor anyone else intends to pay, returns from town and, in a drunken rage, mistakes Huck for a death angel and tries to stab him, forcing Huck to sleep with a rifle for protection. Fearing for his life, Huck escapes, staging his own murder to avoid pursuit. On the opposite bank of the Mississippi, he meets Jim, who has also run away from the widow. Together, they build a raft and set off for Cairo, where Jim hopes to gain freedom and buy his family's freedom. However, they accidentally pass Cairo, and Huck, conflicted over helping an enslaved person escape, briefly abandons Jim but ultimately apologizes, reuniting with him.

Their journey takes a twist when two conmen—one a self-styled amateur actor and dandy claiming to be the Duke of Bridgewater, and the other a swindler calling himself Louis XVII, the "son" of King Louis XVI and Marie Antoinette—join them on the raft. When they stop in a town, the Duke stages Shakespearean plays in local theaters, amusing crowds before escaping with their money. In the next town, the King learns about the recent death of a preacher, Peter Wilks, whose daughters stand to inherit a fortune. If Wilks' English brothers, Harvey and the mute William, arrive, they would claim part of the inheritance. The King and the Duke pose as the brothers, with Huck as their servant. Discovering their scam to steal from orphans, Huck hides the stolen money in Peter’s coffin. However, the real Harvey and William arrive, and Huck and Jim try to escape, though the King and Duke catch up. Eventually, Huck buys tickets to Cairo to finally part ways with the conmen, but the King sells Jim for drink money. Huck devises a plan to rescue Jim, even as the townspeople cover the conmen in tar and feathers and chase them away. Compassionate despite their deception, Huck and Jim let the weeping frauds back on their raft. Huck’s final resolve is to help Jim achieve freedom, no matter the cost.

== Cast ==
- Roman Madyanov as Huck
- Vladimir Basov as Huck's father
- Feliks Imokuede as Jim
- Vladimir Ivashov as Colonel Sherborne
- Vakhtang Kikabidze as Duke (voiced by Leonid Kanevsky)
- Yevgeny Leonov as King
- Irina Popova
- Ivan Ryzhov
- Natalya Sayko
- Irina Skobtseva
- Veriko Verulashvili

== See also ==
- List of films featuring slavery
- The Adventures of Tom Sawyer and Huckleberry Finn (Приключения Тома Сойера и Гекльберри Финна), 1981 Soviet Union 3 episodes version directed by Stanislav Govorukhin
