= Return from Orbit =

- Directed by: Aleksandr Surin
- Written by: Evgeniy Mesyatsev
- Starring: Juozas Budraitis; Vitaly Solomin; Aleksandr Porokhovshchikov
- Cinematography: Sergei Stasenko
- Music by: Eduard Artemyev
- Production company: Dovzhenko Film Studios
- Release date: 20 August 1984 (Soviet Union)
- Running time: 84 minutes
- Country: Soviet Union
- Language: Russian

Return from Orbit
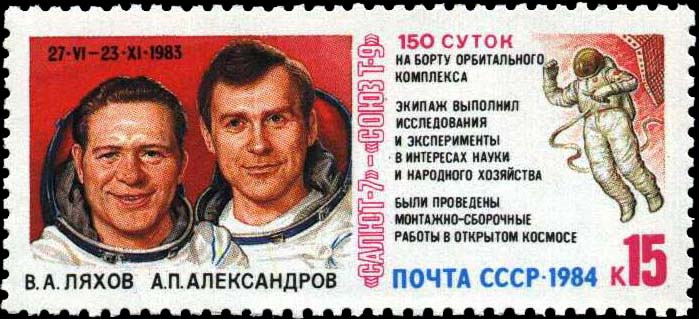
- Cast launched to Salyut 7 for the film
- Space career

A Film Shot On Space Station
- Time in space: 149 d, 10 h, 45 m (total production time unknown)
- Missions: Soyuz T-9

Return from Orbit (Russian: Возвращение с орбиты, romanized: Vozvraschenie s orbiti) is a Soviet 1984 science fiction film directed by Aleksandr Surin. It featured scenes filmed in orbit onboard Salyut 7 space station and Soyuz T-9 spacecraft.

The film depicts an accident on an orbital station where a meteor storm results in a life-threatening injury for the mission commander which requires an emergency return to Earth. An experienced team is sent to evacuate the crew and repair the station, but faces another serious incident which puts their own lives in grave danger.

== Plot ==
Cosmonauts Pavel Kuznetsov and Vyacheslav Mukhin are longtime friends who came to make an outstanding team. On their first space mission, the rocket spectacularly fails, but their spacecraft is ejected to safety by the launch escape system. They are shaken by the experience, but determined to make another attempt.

As new launch is scheduled shortly, Kuznetsov learns of a sudden death of his estranged wife. Devastated, he submits his resignation and leaves Baikonur to look after his young daughter. Mukhin catches up with his night train and tries to make Pavel reconsider, without success. Exiting on a desert station, Mukhin calls his girlfriend Sasha and unexpectedly proposes to her.

Next morning, Mukhin successfully launches into space in a crew with a backup mission commander. Kuznetsov hears the announcement on the radio, and his fellow passenger calls it an easy stroll for fame and medals. Pavel reminds him of the dangers of spaceflight, and that the crew might never return home.

On the orbital station, meteor shower causes a short circuit that disables critical electrical systems. Mukhin's crewmate is severely injured while trying to repair the damage. Emergency return is required, but the docking system is disabled, stranding the crew on their Soyuz-T spacecraft.

Kuznetsov is tracked to his train and ordered to return to duty. Assigned a new flight engineer to mount the rescue mission, Pavel docks the opposite side of the station. He spacewalks to the stranded spacecraft and helps Mukhin drag the unconscious cosmonaut through the open space. Backup crewmates then make an emergency landing, while Kuznetsov and Mukhin are reunited as a team. They successfully repair the station and prepare to return to Earth.

As they undock their spacecraft, another meteor shower damages the shielding and disables orientation engines. The air is quickly draining from the cabin, so the cosmonauts seal their suits and activate reserve oxygen supply, which will only last for 12 hours.

Major General Sviridov, the head of the Cosmonaut's Training Center, volunteers for a dangerous rescue mission. He approaches the disabled spacecraft, which is spinning uncontrollably, and makes several unsuccessful docking attempts, nearly running out of fuel.

Kuznetsov exits to the spacecraft's exterior and stop the rotation with a makeshift rocket engine that Mukhin assembled from spare parts. As Pavel tries to connect their craft's air hose to the reserve oxygen tanks on the Sviridov's spacecraft, his air supply runs out. Mukhin redirects his own supply to his friend's system, dooming himself to certain death.

== Cast ==
- Juozas Budraitis as Colonel of Naval Aviation Pavel Kuznetsov
- Vitaly Solomin as flight engineer Vyacheslav Mukhin
- Aleksandr Porokhovshchikov as Major General of Aviation Alexei Evgenievich Sviridov
- Tamara Akulova as Sasha, Mukhin's girlfriend
- Igor Vasiliev as mission controller
- Lyubov Sokolova as Sofia Petrovna, mother-in-law of Kuznetsov
- Igor Dmitriev as Kuznetsov's fellow traveler on the train
- Valery Yurchenko as Valery Romanov, Mukhin's crewmate

== Production ==
The film includes scenes shot on the Soviet space station Salyut 7 and the spacecraft Soyuz T-9 by cosmonauts Vladimir Lyakhov and Aleksandr Aleksandrov. Some scenes were shot in the Yuri Gagarin Cosmonaut Training Center and in the RKA Mission Control Center.

== Awards ==
The film received a special prize and a diploma in 1984 at the 17th All-Union Film Festival (Kiev): in the program of feature films.
