= Andrey Myagkov =

Soviet and Russian actor (1938–2021)

- Андрей Мягков
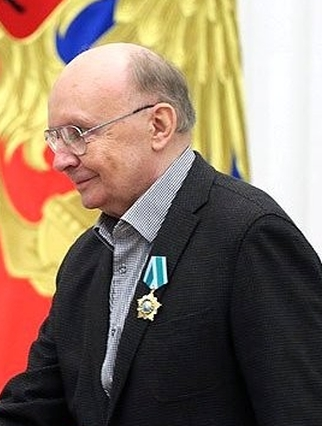
- Myagkov in 2013
- Born: Andrey Vasilyevich Myagkov; 8 July 1938; Leningrad, Russian SFSR, Soviet Union
- Died: 18 February 2021 (aged 82); Moscow, Russia
- Occupations: Actor, theatre director, writer, painter
- Years active: 1965–2013
- Spouse: Anastasia Voznesenskaya (m. 1963)
- Awards: USSR State Prize (1977, 1979); People's Artist of the RSFSR (1986)

Andrey Vasilyevich Myagkov (Russian: Андрей Васильевич Мягков; 8 July 1938 – 18 February 2021) was a Soviet and Russian stage and film actor, theater director and writer. He is best known for his roles in famous films directed by Eldar Ryazanov, such as The Irony of Fate (1975), Office Romance (1977), The Garage (1979) and A Cruel Romance (1984).

== Biography ==
Andrey Myagkov was born on 8 July 1938 in Leningrad, USSR. His father, Vasily Myagkov, was a professor at Leningrad State Technical University. Young Myagkov showed interest in theater and acting and participated in a drama club at high school. Upon his graduation from high school, he chose to study chemistry and attended the Lensoviet Leningrad Institute of Technology, graduating in 1961 as a chemical engineer. His first job was an engineer-researcher at the Leningrad State Institute of Plastics. At the same time, he continued to play on stage as an amateur actor.

In 1961, he entered the Nemirovich-Danchenko Moscow Art Theatre school. After graduation in 1964, Myagkov joined the Sovremennik Theatre in Moscow. There, his stage partners were such notable Soviet actors as Oleg Yefremov, Yevgeny Yevstigneyev, Galina Volchek, Oleg Tabakov, Oleg Dal, Igor Kvasha, Valentin Gaft. One of his first stage plays was Uncle's Dream (based on Fyodor Dostoevsky's novel of the same name) where he performed the role of the uncle.

In cinema, he got his big break when director Elem Klimov offered him the lead role in the satiric film Adventures of a Dentist (1965). His next work in cinema was a role of Alyosha in critically acclaimed The Brothers Karamazov (1969) based on Dostoevsky's eponymous novel, which made him known.

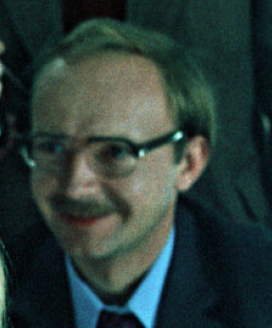
Myagkov in 1977

In 1975, he gained fame in the enormously popular comedy-drama film The Irony of Fate as a surgeon, Zhenya Lukashin. In 1977, he starred in another Ryazanov hit, Office Romance, as timid statistician Anatoly Novoseltsev, alongside Alisa Freindlich, in which he also debuted as a singer. For both roles he was awarded the USSR State Prize. In 1978, he was named Best Actor by readers of Soviet Screen.

In 1977, Myagkov left the Sovremennik Theatre and joined the Moscow Art Theatre (MKhAT), where he debuted in the leading role as Zilov in Duck Hunt by Aleksandr Vampilov, and eventually established himself as a leading actor in many other stage productions.

His other notable films are The Days of the Turbins (1976) based on Mikhail Bulgakov's novel, The Garage (1979), Vertical Race (1983), A Cruel Romance (1984).

In the 1990s, Myagkov concentrated on theatrical performances and worked as a professor at the Moscow Art Theatre school. In this period he starred in the drama Mother (1990), Leonid Gaidai's comedy film Weather Is Good on Deribasovskaya, It Rains Again on Brighton Beach (1992), and the detective story Contract with Death (1998).

Myagkov played over 50 roles in film and on television. In 1989, Myagkov made his debut as a director on the stage of Moscow Art Theatre with Goodnight, Mama (Spokoinoy nochi, Mama). In 2000 he directed a stageplay, Retro.

== Death ==
Myagkov died on 18 February 2021 in Moscow from acute heart failure.

== Selected filmography ==
- Adventures of a Dentist (Похождения зубного врача, 1965) as Sergey Petrovich Chesnokov
- The Brothers Karamazov (Братья Карамазовы, 1969) as Alyosha Karamazov
- Grandmaster (Гроссмейстер, 1972) as Sergey Aleksandrovich Khlebnikov
- The Irony of Fate (Ирония судьбы, или С лёгким паром!, 1975) as Zhenya Lukashin
- The Days of the Turbins (Дни Турбиных, 1976) as Aleksei Turbin
- Office Romance (Служебный роман, 1977) as Anatoly Novoseltsev
- The Garage (Гараж, 1979) as Khvostov
- Vertical Race (Гонки по вертикали, 1982) as Inspector Stanislav Tikhonov
- Lethargy (Летаргия, 1983) as Vadim Sergeyevich Bekasov
- Epilogue (Послесловие, 1983) as Vladimir Shvyrkov
- A Cruel Romance (Жестокий романс, 1984) as Yuliy Kapitonovich Karandyshev
- The Last Road (Последняя дорога, 1986) as Dubelt
- Weather Is Good on Deribasovskaya, It Rains Again on Brighton Beach (На Дерибасовской хорошая погода, или На Брайтон-Бич опять идут дожди, 1992) as "Artist", the leader of the Russian mafia / uncle Misha, immigrant
- Contract with Death (Контракт со смертью, 1998) as Professor Gleb Sergeyevich Ignatovsky
- The Irony of Fate 2 (Ирония Судьбы. Продолжение, 2007) as Zhenya Lukashin
