= Ilf and Petrov Rode a Tram =

As Ilf and Petrov rode a tram
- Directed by: Viktor Titov
- Written by: Viktor Titov
- Starring: Yevgeny Leonov; Mikhail Gluzsky; Vladimir Basov; Rolan Bykov; Zinovy Gerdt; Innokenty Smoktunovsky
- Cinematography: Georgy Rerberg
- Music by: Nikita Bogoslovsky
- Production company: Mosfilm
- Release date: 19 August 1972
- Running time: 72 minutes
- Country: Soviet Union
- Language: Russian

Ilf and Petrov Rode a Tram (Russian: Ехали в трамвае Ильф и Петров, romanized: Ehali v tramvae Ilf i Petrov is a 1972 Soviet comedy film directed by Viktor Titov.

== Plot ==
The film is a series of short comedies, based on humorous anecdotes, stories and notebooks of famous satirist writers Ilya Ilf and Yevgeny Petrov. These comedies describe the everyday life of Moscow and in the 1920s and 1930s; the film uses a lot of newsreels of the time.

Comedy's subjects are various as life itself. For example, a clerk named Kapitulov is constantly scaring his wife and colleagues with his poor health. As a result, all the household chores is shouldered on his wife, and his colleagues at work do all Kapitulov's duties, while he sleeps nearby, sitting on a chair ...

== Cast ==
- Innokenty Smoktunovsky as tramway passenger
- Vladimir Basov as tramway passenger
- Svetlana Starikova as tramway passenger
- Emmanuil Geller as tramway passenger
- Nicholas Gorlov as tramway passenger
- Elena Volsky as check-taker
- Yevgeny Leonov as Vitaly Kapitulov
- Nina Agapova as Vera, Kapitulov's wife
- Nikholay Grabbe as chief editor of newspaper
- Grigory Shpigel as employee of the newspaper
- Olga Gobzeva as typewriter
- Mikhail Gluzsky as accountant Brykin
- Ivan Ryzhov as chief editor of newspaper «Fising»'
- Zinovy Gerdt as Captain Mazuchcho, animal trainer
- Arkady Zinman as director of circus
- Lidiya Smirnova as handler and artistic director of circus
- Vladimir Grammatikov as Ussishkin, commissioner of circus
- Nicholas Dostal as commissioner of circus
- Nina Alisova as Vasilisa Aleksandrovna, secretary
- Vyacheslav Gostinsky as circus ringmaster
- Igor Yasulovich as Vasya the sculptor / Hans the sculptor
- Svetlana Danilchenko as girl in a beret
- Rolan Bykov as Ivan S. Fedorenko
- Lev Durov as passerby / Gusev-Lebedev
- Michaela Drozdovskaya as nurse
- Yevgeny Morgunov as robber
- Valery Nosik as Kipyatkov
- Rudolf Rudin as visitor to the cafe
- Jacob Lenz as visitor to the cafe
- Oleg Tabakov as voice-over
