= Valery Nosik =

Soviet and Russian actor (1940–1995)

- Валерий Носик
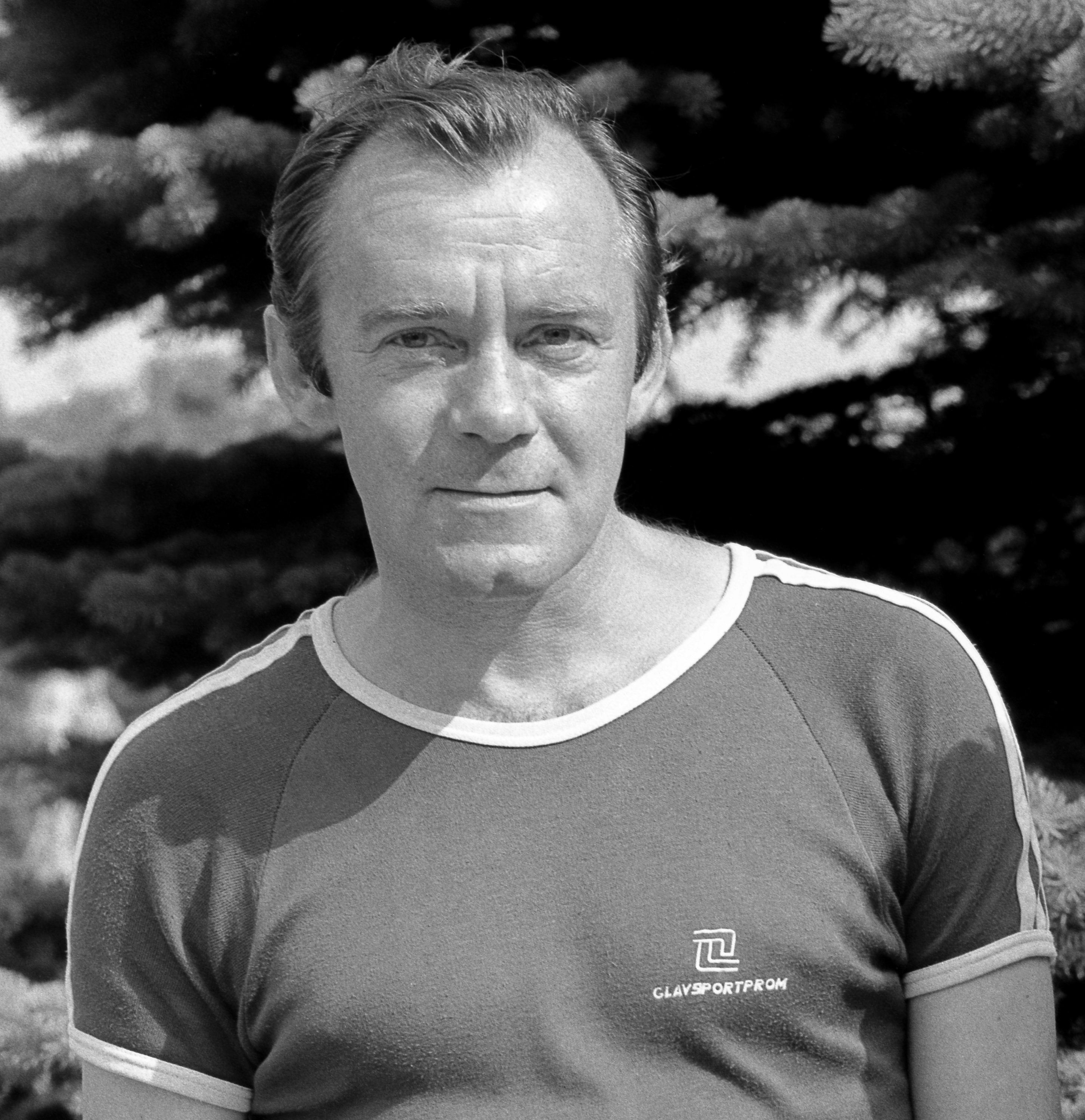
- Nosik in 1982
- Born: Valery Benediktovich Nosik; 9 October 1940; Moscow, Soviet Union
- Died: 4 January 1995 (aged 54); Moscow, Russia
- Occupation: actor
- Years active: 1958-1994
- Spouse(s): Liya Akhedzhakova; Maria Sternikova

Valery Benediktovich Nosik (Russian: Валерий Бенедиктович Носик; 9 October 1940 — 4 January 1995) was a Soviet Russian film and stage actor, the People's Artist of Russia (1994) who appeared in more than 100 films, as well as in numerous stage productions at the Moscow Pushkin Drama (1965-1972) and the Maly Theatres (1972-1995).

== Biography ==
Valery Nosik was born in 1940 to Benedict Nosek, a Pole who in the 1900s came to settle in Ukraine, and 'simplified' his surname by changing a letter. He then married Alexandra Subbotina, a Russian girl from Kashira, and moved to Moscow. Valery's younger brother Vladimir Nosik was born in 1948 (to become later an actor too).

As a schoolboy, Valery Nosik attended the Youth Theatre studio based at the ZiL Culture Club, where he was tutored by Sergey Stein. After the graduation he enrolled in the VGIK institute to study in Mikhail Romm's class. Long before the graduation in 1963 Nosik made his screen debut in Knock Every Door (1958) directed by Maria Fyodorova. From then on he was cast regularly, mainly in peripheral, but memorable comedy roles which, according to a biographer, "had a way of lightening up even the dullest of films." Only occasionally was he provided the opportunity to demonstrate his dramatic talent, which he did in Horizon (1961), Scrambled Boots (1977) and Shura and Prosvirnyak (1987), to impressive effect.

Up until 1965 Nosik worked at the Moscow Young Viewer's Theatre, then joined the Moscow Pushkin Drama Theatre. In 1972 he moved to the Maly Theatre where he worked up until his death of heart attack, on 4 January 1995. Valery Benediktovich Nosik is deterred at the Troyekurovskoye Cemetery in Moscow.

== Private life ==
Valery Nosik's first wife was actress Liya Akhedzhakova, his second — actress Maria Sternikova. In this marriage which lasted nine years, their son Alexander Nosik was born in 1971, who later became an actor too.

== Selected filmography ==
- Introduction to Life (Вступление, 1962) as Romka
- Operation Y and Shurik's Other Adventures (Операция „Ы“ и другие приключения Шурика, 1965) as student-gambler
- The Tale of Tsar Saltan (1966) as servant
- Madness (Hullumeelsus, 1969) as editor
- Crime and Punishment (Преступление и наказание, 1970) as Zametov
- Liberation (Освобождение, 1970) as Dorozhkin
- As Ilf and Petrov rode a tram (Ехали в трамвае Ильф и Петров, 1972) as Kipyatkov
- Ruslan and Ludmila (Руслан и Людмила, 1972) as messenger
- Big School-Break (Большая перемена, 1973) as Otto Fukin
- Adventures in a City that does not Exist (Приключения в городе, которого нет, 1974) as informant "Mustache"
- Incognito from St. Petersburg (Инкогнито из Петербурга, 1977) as Luka Lukich Khlopov
- There Was a Piano-Tuner... (Жил-был настройщик, 1979) as Nikodim Savelyev
- Simply Awful! (Просто ужас, 1982) as hunter
- Vertical Race (Гонки по вертикали, 1983) as airport employee
- Promised Heaven (Небеса обетованные, 1991) as bum
- Dreams (Сны, 1993) as Minister of Culture of Russia
- The Master and Margarita (Мастер и Маргарита, 1994) as Aloysius Mogarych (uncredited)
- Za co? (За что?, 1995) as charioteer
