= Natalya Sayko =

Soviet and Russian actress

- Born: 12 January 1948 (age 78); Tallinn, Estonia
- Occupation: Actress
- Years active: 1969-present

Natalya Petrovna Saiko (Russian: Наталья Петровна Сайко, born 12 January 1948) is a Soviet and Russian actress. She appeared in more than thirty films since 1969.

== Selected filmography ==
- Confrontation (Противостояние) as Anna Petrova (1985)
- Sofia Kovalevskaya (Софья Ковалевская) as Yulia Lermontova (1985)
- Professor Dowell's Testament (Завещание профессора Доуэля) as Angelika, Monika, Eva (1984)
- Crazy Day of Engineer Barkasov (Безумный день инженера Баркасова) as Zoya Barkasova (1983)
- Golos (Голос) as Yulia Martynova (1982)
- Moon Rainbow (Лунная радуга) as Lyudmila Bakulina (1983)
- Hopelessly Lost (Совсем пропащий) as Mary Jane (1973)
