= The Trust That Went Bust =

- Written by: Igor Shevtsov
- Directed by: Aleksandr Pavlovsky
- Starring: Regimantas Adomaitis; Nikolai Karachentsov; Leonid Kuravlyov; Mikhail Svetin; Irina Ponarovskaya; Vladimir Basov
- Music by: Maksim Dunayevsky
- Country of origin: Soviet Union
- Original language: Russian

Production
- Producer: Mikhail Byaly
- Cinematography: Vyacheslav Syomin
- Editor: Inna Chausskaya
- Running time: 196 minutes
- Production company: Odessa Film Studio

Original release
- Release: 1983 – 1983

The Trust That Went Bust (Russian: «Трест, который лопнул», romanized: Trest, kotoryy lopnul, Ukrainian: «Трест, що луснув») is a Soviet 1983 musical TV miniseries (total runtime 196 min) based on short stories by O. Henry: "The Octopus Marooned", "Jeff Peters as a Personal Magnet", "Modern Rural Sports", "The Hand That Riles the World", "The Exact Science of Matrimony", and "The Ethics of Pig". Directed by Aleksandr Pavlovsky. Screenplay by Igor Shevtsov

== Cast ==
- Regimantas Adomaitis as Andy Tucker (voiced-over by Aleksandr Demyanenko on dialogue and Pavel Smeyan in songs)
- Nikolai Karachentsov as Jeff Peters
- Leonid Kuravlyov as Farmer Ezra Plunkett
- Mikhail Svetin as Doorman Klein
- Irina Ponarovskaya as Pseudo-Sarah Bernhardt
- Vladimir Basov as Pseudo-John Pierpont Morgan
- Yuri Mazhuga as Bill Humble
- Pavel Vinnik as The storeowner
- Yelena Aminova as Female secretary at the ministry
- Vsevolod Abdulov as Joe Blassome
- Tamara Yatsenko as The widowed Miss Trotter (voiced-over by Natalya Andrejchenko)
- Viktor Ilyichov as Ruf Tattum
- Gennadi Yalovich as The postman
- Boris Novikov as The artillerist
- Lev Perfilov as The keyhole-peeping con artist
- David Makarevsky as The Mayor
- Aleksandr Pavlovsky as The Mayor's nephew
- Viktor Pavlovsky as The policeman
- Mikhail Muromov as The busker
- Ingrīda Andriņa as Mrs. Ezra Plunkett
- Oleg Fedulov as Drunk man (uncredited)
- Leonid Anisimov
- Viktor Andriyenko
- Valeri Bassel
- Boris Astankov
- Vitaly Derkach
- Sergey Zinchenko
- Georgy Derevyansky
- Igor Tiltikov
- Gennady Butrov

== Songs in the film ==
- Composer - Maksim Dunayevsky
- Lyrics by Naum Olev (1-3 parts), Leonid Filatov (1st part)
