= Yuri Zavadsky =

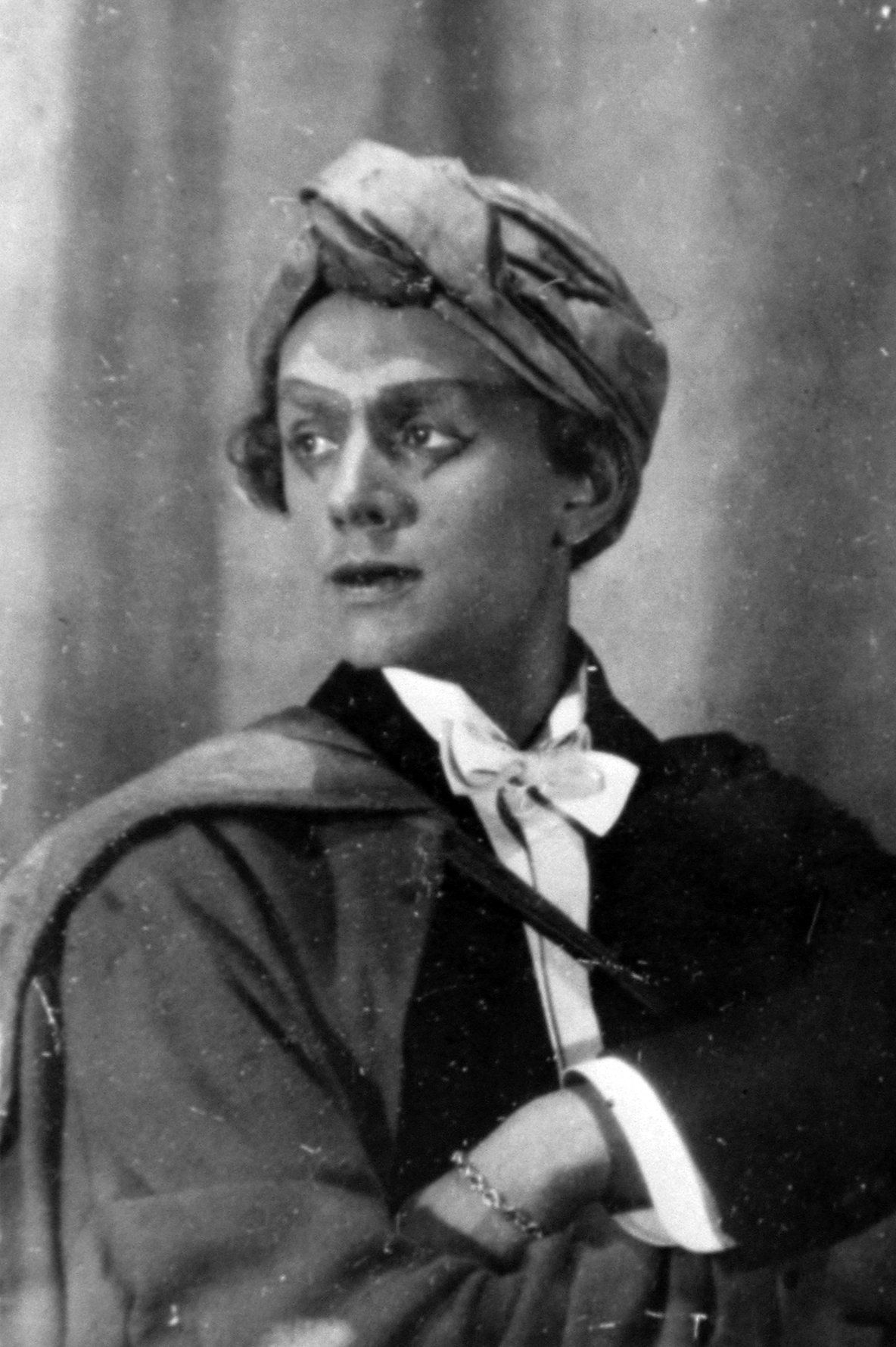
Yuri Zavadsky in 1922

Yuri Aleksandrovich Zavadsky (Russian: Юрий Александрович Завадский; 12 July 1894, Moscow — 5 April 1977, Moscow) was a Soviet and Russian theater director, actor and pedagogue. People's Artist of the USSR (1948) and Hero of Socialist Labour (1973).

Zavadsky studied under Yevgeny Vakhtangov, and made his acting debut at Vakhtangov's theatre, playing Anthony in Maurice Maeterlinck's play The Miracle of St. Anthony (1915). He worked in various Russian theaters before moving to the Mossovet Theatre in Moscow as a director in 1940. The most famous actors of his company were Rostislav Plyatt (1908–89), Faina Ranevskaya (1896-1984), Lyubov Orlova (1902–75), and his wife Vera Maretskaya (1906-1978).

In 1924, he and Maretskaya married, and they had one son. They remained lifelong friends and stage partners, even after the end of their brief marriage.
