= Vladimir Basov =

Soviet actor, film director, and screenwriter

- Владимир Басов
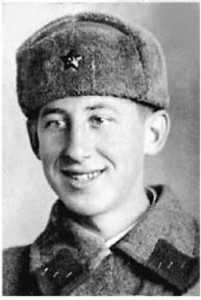
- Basov in 1943
- Born: 28 July 1923; Urazovo, Russian SFSR, Soviet Union
- Died: 17 September 1987 (aged 64); Moscow, Russian SFSR, Soviet Union
- Occupations: Actor, film director, screenwriter
- Notable work: The Shield and the Sword (1968)
- Title: People's Artist of the USSR (1983)
- Awards: Medal for Battle Merit (1943), Order of the Red Star (1945)

Vladimir Pavlovich Basov (Russian: Владимир Павлович Басов; 28 July 1923 – 17 September 1987) was a Soviet actor, film director and screenwriter. He was named a People's Artist of the USSR in 1983.

== Biography ==
Vladimir Basov was born in the Urazovo village, Voronezh Governorate (now Belgorod Oblast) to Pavel Basov (Basultainen) and Aleksandra Basova. His father was a Tartu alumnus of Finnish ethnicity who joined Bolsheviks during the revolution. "Basov" was his party alias later adopted as a family name. He served as an officer and political commissar up until his death in 1931. Vladimir's mother Aleksandra Ivanovna was a daughter of a Russian Orthodox priest from Pokrovsk. She met Pavel during the Civil War; he was a runaway and asked for shelter. During the 1920s she taught peasant children Russian language and literature. According to Vladimir Basov Jr., his father had Russian, Finnish and Georgian roots.

In 1941 Vladimir Basov joined the Great Patriotic War. He served in the Red Army as an artillery officer, mortar battery commander, then, as a staff officer in the 28th Special Artillery Division in the rank of Kapitan. He was awarded the Medal "For Battle Merit" in 1943 and the Order of the Red Star in 1945 for displaying outstanding heroism during the capture of a Nazi military base. He was wounded in action, but continued serving until the war ended.

In 1947 Basov entered VGIK. He studied direction under Sergei Yutkevich and Mikhail Romm and graduated in 1952 to work on the Mosfilm studio. As a director Basov made 18 films, and one teleplay. Among his most acclaimed pictures is the TV adaption of Mikhail Bulgakov's play The Days of the Turbins and a big-screen spy thriller The Shield and the Sword (1968) which he also co-wrote. He is credited with writing screenplays to most of his movies.

In 1963 his friend Georgiy Daneliya offered a small part in the upcoming film Walking the Streets of Moscow (1963). Basov quickly turned into one of the most beloved Soviet comedy actors. He usually portrayed episodic, but distinguishing characters running some shady businesses, such as the lonely official in Moscow Does Not Believe in Tears. Among his bigger roles is Viktor Myshlaevsky in The Days of the Turbins (1976), Huck Finn's father in Hopelessly Lost (1973), Duremar in The Adventures of Buratino (1975), Pyotr Luzhin in Crime and Punishment (1969), Artur Arturovich in The Flight (1970), Stump in The Adventures of the Elektronic (1979). He also voiced a number of popular animated cartoons.

His busy schedule mixed with heavy drinking resulted in serious health problems during the 1980s. In 1983 he survived a stroke that led to complete paralysis of half of his body, yet he continued working. Basov died after a second stroke in 1987. He was buried on the Kuntsevo Cemetery.

Basov was a member of the Communist Party since 1948.

== Personal life ==
Vladimir Basov was married three times to three Soviet actresses. His first wife was Roza Makagonova (1927-1995). They met while studying at VGIK. They had no children.

His second marriage was to Natalya Fateyeva. They had one son - Vladimir Basov Jr. (born 1959), also a prominent actor and film director.

His last wife was Valentina Titova. Their son Aleksandr Basov (born 1965) is a Russian film director as well, while their daughter Yelizaveta (born 1971) finished dance courses.

== Selected filmography ==
Year	Film	Original title	Role	Notes
1954	Courage School	Школа мужества	Poruchik (uncredited)	Also director
1955	The Crash of the Emirate	Крушение эмирата	Colonel (uncredited)	Also director
1957	It Happened at the Mine Number Eight	Случай на шахте восемь	Uncredited	Also director
1961	The Fight on a Way	Битва в пути	Broadcaster's voice	Also director
1963	Walking the Streets of Moscow	Я шагаю по Москве	Floor polisher	
1963	The Silence	Тишина	Driver	Also director
1964	The Blizzard	Метель	Uncredited	Also director
1965	Thirty Three	Тридцать три	Museum's director	
1965	Operation Y and Shurik's Other Adventures	Операция «Ы» и другие приключения Шурика	The strict policeman	
1968	The Shield and the Sword	Щит и меч	Bruno	Also director
1969	Crime and Punishment	Преступление и наказание	Pyotr Petrovitch Luzhin	
1970	The Flight	Бег	Artur Arturovich, the Cockroach Tsar	
1972	As Ilf and Petrov Rode a Tram	Ехали в трамвае Ильф и Петров	Tramway passenger / The head of department	
1972	Back to Life	Возвращение к жизни	Guitarist	Also director
1972	Dangerous Corner	Опасный поворот	Charles Trevor Stanton	Also director
1973	Big School-Break	Большая перемена	Photographer	
1973	Hopelessly Lost	Совсем пропащий	Huck's father	
1973	Chipollino	Чиполлино	Prince Lemon	
1974	100% Nylon	Нейлон 100 %	Kireev the lawyer	Also director
1975	The Adventures of Buratino	Приключения Буратино	Duremar	
1975	Afonya	Афоня	Vladimir Ivanovich	
1975	Captain Nemo	Капитан Немо	Royer	
1975	Vasilisa Mikulishna (animation)	Василиса Микулишна	Prince Vladimir	Voice only
1976	The Days of the Turbins	Дни Турбиных	Viktor Myshlayevsky	Also director
1976	Sentimental Romance	Сентиментальный роман	Father	
1977	About the Little Red Riding Hood	Про Красную Шапочку	Thin Wolf	
1977	Mimino	Мимино	Sinitsyn, the opera singer	
1977	The Nose	Нос	A Doctor	
1977	Domestic Circumstances	По семейным обстоятельствам	Edward Bubukin	
The Miracle Voice of Gelsomino	Волшебный голос Джельсомино	King Giacomon	Vocal by Oleg Anofriyev	
1978	A Dog Was Walking Down the Piano	Шла собака по роялю	Gromov	
1978	The New Adventures of Captain Wrongel	Новые приключения капитана Врунгеля	Block Silent	
1978	Father Sergius	Отец Сергий	uncredited	
1978	Last Bride of Zmey Gorynych (animation)	Последняя невеста Змея Горыныча	Zmey Gorynych	Voice only
1979	Moscow Does Not Believe in Tears	Москва слезам не верит	Anton Kruglov	Best Foreign Language Film of 1980
1979	The Adventures of Elektronic	Приключения Электроника	Stump the chief gangster	
1979	The Suicide Club, or the Adventures of a Titled Person	Клуб самоубийц, или Приключения титулованной особы	Inspector Trenton	
1980	Teheran 43	Тегеран-43	Taxi driver	Soviet-French-Swiss-Spanish production
1981	Unpaid Vacation	Отпуск за свой счёт	Yevdokimov	USSR-Hungary production
1981	Be My Husband	Будьте моим мужем	Camper	
1981	Past Day Facts	Факты минувшего дня	Petr Danilovich	Also director
1981	Silva	Сильва	Oberleutnant von Rohnsdorff	
1982	The Story of Voyages	Сказка странствий	Lawyer	
1982	Look for a Woman	Ищите женщину	Jacque-Pierre Antoine	
1982	The Trust That Has Burst	Трест, который лопнул	Fake John Morgan	
1982	The Circus Princess	Принцесса цирка	Pelikan	
Chertyonok № 13 (animation)	Чертёнок № 13	Teacher	Voice only	
1984	Time and the Conways	Время и семья Конвей	Ernest Beevers	Also director
1985	A Boatswain and a Parrot (animation)	Боцман и попугай	Film director	Voice only
1986	Seven Cries in the Ocean	Семь криков в океане		Director only
