= Moon Rainbow =

- Directed by: Andrei Yermash
- Written by: Sergei Pavlov; Andrei Yermash; Valentin Yezhov
- Based on: Moon Rainbow by Sergei Pavlov
- Starring: Vladimir Gostyukhin; Vasily Livanov; Yury Solomin; Igor Starygin
- Cinematography: Naum Ardashnikov; Boris Travkin
- Edited by: Tatiana Egorycheva
- Music by: Eduard Artemyev
- Production company: Mosfilm
- Release date: December 1983 (Soviet Union)
- Running time: 90 minutes
- Country: Soviet Union
- Language: Russian

Moon Rainbow (Russian: Лунная радуга, romanized: Lunnaya raduga) is a 1983 Soviet science fiction drama film directed by Andrei Yermash based on the novel of the same name by Sergei Pavlov about a person gaining inexplicable extrasensory properties in the process of space exploration.

== Plot ==
In different regions of the Earth, "black traces" are registered where unexplained atmospheric anomalies and magnetic storms take place. A specially created operational group manages to find out the connection of "traces" with a cosmic catastrophe on the outskirts of the Solar System, as a result of which only four survivors were left. They were Timur Kizimov, David Norton, Jean Laura and Eduard Jong.

On Oberon, a satellite of the planet Uranus, there was a geological catastrophe — a huge section of the surface collapsed into the bowels of the planetoid. As a consequence, nine of the Space Marine spies sent by the "Moon Rainbow" expedition were killed, leaving the four others. During the incident, above the place of collapse, a strange greenish glow of unclear nature appears. The four survivors apparently fall under the influence of radiation from this phenomenon.

The story of the "Black Wave" begins in the Pamir Mountains, at the weather station "Eagle Peak", where during a blizzard all electronics fail due to the extraordinary abilities of the former Space Marine Kizimov, who is just carrying out the watch at that time. But in the film, more attention is paid to the story of David Norton, nicknamed "Moon Dev". Thanks to his super abilities acquired at the time of the disaster on Oberon, he performs a feat inexplicable from any scientific point of view, passing safely unaided across the plateau of "Fire Snakes" on Mercury where, before his attempt, reconnaissance squads constantly perished.

== Cast ==
- Vladimir Gostyukhin — David Norton (Moon Dev)
- Vasily Livanov — Galbraith
- Yury Solomin — Nikolsky
- Igor Starygin — Frank Pauling
- Vladimir Kenigson — Charles Leonard Rogan
- Georgiy Taratorkin — Timur Kizimov
- Natalya Sayko — Lyudmila Bakulina (Bystrov)
- Aleksandr Porokhovshchikov — Buck
- Leonid Nevedomsky — Garanin
- Grazhyna Baikshtite — Silvia Norton
- Gediminas Girdvainis — Albertas Grizhas
- Boris Ivanov — Martin Weber
- Sergey Desnitsky — head of the group "Mongoose"
- Alexander Novikov — Aimo Zotto, nicknamed "Canary"
