= Tender Age (1983 film) =

- Russian: Нежный возраст
- Directed by: Valeri Isakov
- Written by: Aleksandr Rekemchuk
- Starring: Yevgeny Dvorzhetskiy; Pavel Ilin; Alyona Belyak; Natalya Kem; Valentina Titova
- Cinematography: Boris Seredin
- Edited by: O. Bachurina; Tamara Belyayeva
- Music by: Vladislav Kladnitskiy
- Release date: 1983
- Running time: 82 minute
- Country: Soviet Union
- Language: Russian

Tender Age (Russian: Нежный возраст) is a 1983 Soviet war drama film directed by Valeri Isakov.

== Plot ==
The film tells about the teenagers Kir Lopukhov and Alyosha Mamykin who graduated from school and entered the artillery school. They only have three days left, for which they need to say goodbye to everyone, and Kir needs to find out about the fate of his girlfriend Olya. He meets her in the subway the day before departure, escorts her home, and in the morning leaves with Alyosha to the front.

== Cast ==
- Yevgeny Dvorzhetskiy
- Pavel Ilin as Aleksey Mamykin (as Pavel Kondratev)
- Alyona Belyak
- Natalya Kem
- Valentina Titova
- German Kachin
- Aleftina Evdokimova
- Aleksandr Arzhilovsky
- Artur Bogatov
- Rem Gekht
