= Aleksandr Porokhovshchikov =

Russian actor and film director

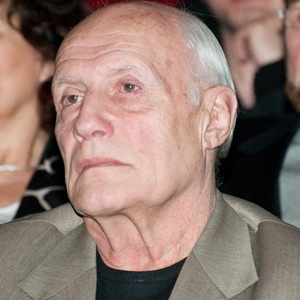
Aleksandr Porokhovshchikov in 2011

Aleksandr Shalvovich Porokhovshchikov (Russian: Александр Шалвович Пороховщиков, 31 January 1939, Moscow – 15 April 2012, Moscow) was a Russian film and theatre actor and film director, People's Artist of Russia (1994). He died of diabetes and other illness at age 73 in Russia.

== Selected filmography ==
- Empire under Attack (Империя под ударом, 2000) as Vladimir Dzhunkovsky
- The Rifleman of the Voroshilov Regiment (Ворошиловский стрелок, 1999) as police colonel Pashutin
- Tax Сollector (Мытарь, 1995) as Potocky
- Professor Dowell's Testament (Завещание профессора Доуэля, 1984)
- Return from Orbit (Возвращение с орбиты, 1983) as Alexey Sviridov, Major General
- Moon Rainbow (Лунная радуга, 1983) as Back
- Do Not Part with Your Beloved (С любимыми не расставайтесь, 1980) as Nikulin
- The Captivating Star of Happiness (Звезда пленительного счастья, 1975) as Pavel Pestel
- Captain Nemo (Капитан Немо, 1975) as Captain Faragut
- At Home Among Strangers (Свой среди чужих, чужой среди своих, 1974) as Kungarov
- Shine, Shine, My Star (Гори, гори, моя звезда, 1970) as white officer
