= Veniamin Basner =

Russian composer

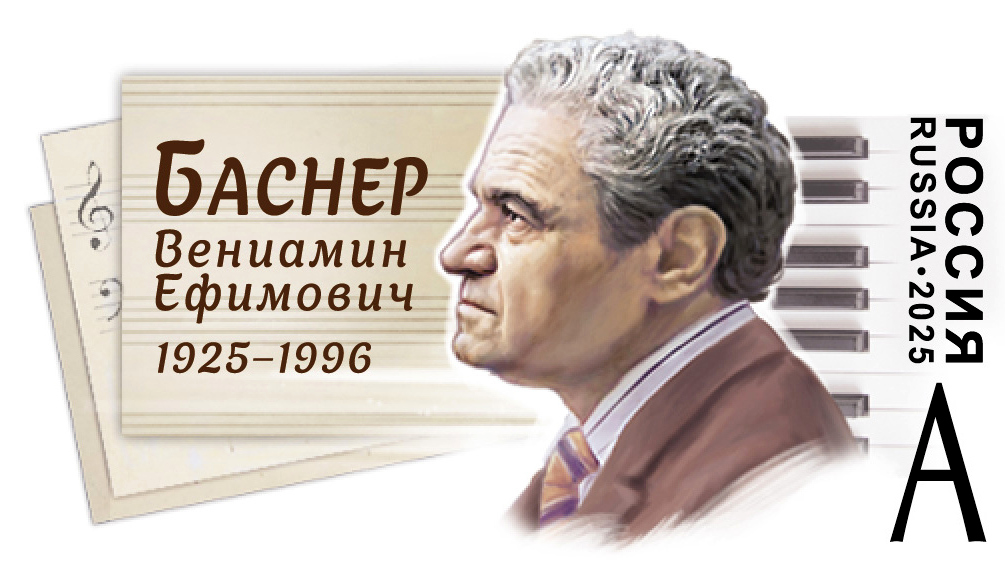
Basner on a 2025 postal cover of Russia

Veniamin Efimovich Basner (Russian: Вениами́н Ефи́мович Ба́снер, 1 January 1925 in Yaroslavl – 3 September 1996 in St Petersburg) was a Russian composer. He was recognized by the Soviet Union as a People's Artist of Russia and a State prize-winner. An asteroid called 4267 Basner, discovered in 1971, was named in his honour. He was a member of the St Petersburg Union of Composers.

== Early life and initial success ==
Veniamin Basner had been playing the violin from the age of six and graduated from the Leningrad Conservatory in 1949 with the violin as his principal instrument.

Basner made his first experiments in composition at the age of fifteen.

In 1955 he was a prize-winner, for his Second String Quartet, at the International Composers' Competition in Warsaw.

== Basner and Shostakovich ==
Veniamin Basner, while still a student, met Dmitri Shostakovich, under whose advice his formation as a professional composer was furthered. They became personal friends.

Much later, Basner and Weinberg were amongst the six friends of Shostakovich (the others being Kara Karayev, Yury Levitin, Karen Khachaturian, and Boris Tishchenko) who rejected the controversial Testimony (Свидетельство), said to be the "authenticated memoirs of Dmitri Shostakovich." (As stated in the article on Testimony.)

== Compositions ==
Basner’s musical output spanned a wide spectrum in terms of genre and emotional substance. It encompasses, at the more academic end, thirteen works for musical theatre, symphonic suites, three symphonies, vocal symphonic cycles, two concertos and five quartets, which have been performed to critical acclaim in Russia and beyond. At a more popular level, he became widely known, reaching millions of people through his film music – for more than a hundred productions – and his over three hundred song compositions.

Biographer Uteshev praises Basner chiefly for “an inspired lyricism [which] powerfully permeates all his art.”
