= List of Soviet films of 1970 =

A list of films produced in the Soviet Union in 1970 (see 1970 in film).

== 1970 ==
Title	Original title	Director	Cast	Genre	Notes
1970
About Love	О любви	Mikhail Bogin	Victoria Fyodorova	Drama	
Adventures of the Yellow Suitcase	Приключения жёлтого чемоданчика	Ilya Frez	Tatyana Pelttser, Yevgeni Lebedev, Natalya Seleznyova, Boris Bystrov	Children's film	
Afrikanych	Африканыч	Mikhail Yershov	Oleg Belov	Comedy	
Attention, Turtle!	Внимание, черепаха!	Rolan Bykov	Alexei Yershov	Comedy	
The Ballad of Bering and His Friends	Баллада о Беринге и его друзьях	Yuri Shvyryov	Karlis Sebris	Adventure	
The Beginning	Начало	Gleb Panfilov	Inna Churikova, Leonid Kuravlyov, Mikhail Kononov	Drama	
The Blue Bird	Синяя птица	Vasily Livanov	Liya Akhedzhakova, Vladimir Kenigson, Yury Yakovlev, Rina Zelyonaya	Animation	
City of First Love	Город первой любви	Boris Yashin and Manos Zacharias	Yelena Alekina	Drama	
Crime and Punishment	Преступление и наказание	Lev Kulidzhanov	Georgi Taratorkin, Innokenti Smoktunovsky, Tatyana Bedova, Victoria Fyodorova	Drama, crime	
The Flight	Бег	Aleksandr Alov and Vladimir Naumov	Lyudmila Savelyeva, Aleksey Batalov, Mikhail Ulyanov, Tatyana Tkach	Drama	Entered into the 1971 Cannes Film Festival
Franz Liszt. Dreams of love	Ференц Лист. Грезы любви	Márton Keleti	Imre Sinkovits, Ariadna Shengelaya, Sándor Pécsi	Biopic	Joint Hungarian-Soviet production
Green Chains	Зелёные цепочки	Grigori Aronov	Aleksandr Grigoryev	Adventure	
Hail, Mary!	Салют, Мария!	Iosif Kheifits	Tatyana Bedova, Ada Rogovtseva	Drama	Entered into the 7th Moscow International Film Festival
Late Flowers	Цветы запоздалые	Abram Room	Irina Lavrenteva, Alexander Lazarev, Olga Zhiznyeva, Valery Zolotukhin	Drama	
Mission in Kabul	Миссия в Кабуле	Leonid Kvinikhidze	Oleg Zhakov	Drama	
My good Dad	Мой добрый папа	Igor Usov	Aliagha Aghayev	Drama	
Passing Through Moscow	В Москве проездом…	Ilya Gurin	Yevgeny Karelskikh	Comedy	
The Polynin Case	Случай с Полыниным	Aleksey Sakharov	Anastasiya Vertinskaya	Drama	
Red Square	Красная площадь	Vasili Ordynsky	Sergei Yakovlev	Drama	
The Return of Saint Luke	Возвращение «Святого Луки»	Anatoliy Bobrovsky	Vsevolod Sanaev	Crime	
The Seagull	Чайка	Anton Chekhov	Alla Demidova	Drama	
Secret Agent's Destiny	Судьба резидента	Veniamin Dorman	Georgiy Zhzhonov	Spy film, drama	
Shine, Shine, My Star	Гори, гори, моя звезда	Alexander Mitta	Oleg Tabakov, Oleg Yefremov, Elena Proklova, Yevgeny Leonov, Leonid Kuravlyov	Comedy, drama	
The Seven Brides of Lance-Corporal Zbruyev	Семь невест ефрейтора Збруева	Vitali Melnikov	Semyon Morozov, Natalya Varley, Yelena Solovey	Comedy	
Sport, Sport, Sport	Спорт, спорт, спорт	Elem Klimov	Zinoviy Gerdt		
Tchaikovsky	Чайковский	Igor Talankin	Innokenty Smoktunovsky, Antonina Shuranova, Kirill Lavrov, Vladislav Strzhelchik	Biopic	Nominated for the 1971 Academy Award for Best Foreign Language Film as well as the Academy Award for Original Song Score and Adaptation
Liberation: The Fire Bulge/Breakthrough	Освобождение: Огненная дуга, Прорыв	Yuri Ozerov	Nikolay Olyalin, Larisa Golubkina, Boris Seidenberg	War film	Soviet-East German-Polish-Italian-Yugoslavian co-production
The Secret of the Iron Door	Тайна железной двери	Mikhail Yuzovsky	Evaldas Mikaliunas, Alisa Freindlich, Oleg Tabakov, Saveli Kramarov	Fantasy	
Stopwatch	Секундомер	Rezo Esadze	Nikolay Olyalin	Drama	
Sunflower	Подсолнухи	Vittorio De Sica	Marcello Mastroianni, Sophia Loren, Lyudmila Savelyeva	Drama	Soviet-Italian co-production
Two Days of Miracles	Два дня чудес	Lev Mirsky	Leonid Kuravlyov	Fantasy	
Uncle Vanya	Дядя Ваня	Andrey Konchalovskiy	Innokenti Smoktunovsky, Sergei Bondarchuk, Irina Kupchenko, Irina Miroshnichenko	Drama	
Urban Romance	Городской романс	Pyotr Todorovsky	Maria Leonova, Yevgeny Kindinov, Zinovy Gerdt	Melodrama	
The Devil's Servants	Vella kalpi Слуги дьявола	Aleksandrs Leimanis	Lolita Cauka, Haralds Ritenbergs, Eduards Pavuls	Comedy	
Waterloo	Ватерлоо	Sergei Bondarchuk	Rod Steiger, Christopher Plummer, Orson Welles, Jack Hawkins	Drama, history, war	Joint Soviet-Italian production
The White Bird Marked with Black	Белая птица с чёрной отметиной	Yuri Ilyenko	Larisa Kadochnikova, Ivan Mykolaychuk, Bohdan Stupka	Drama	Won the Golden Prize at Moscow
