= Korchagin =

Korchagin (Russian: Корчагин) is a Russian masculine surname, its feminine counterpart is Korchagina or Kortchaguina. It may refer to:

- Andrei Korchagin (born 1980), Russian football player
- Edik Korchagin
- Erik Korchagin (born 1979), Russian football player
- Ivan Korchagin (1898–1951), Soviet general
- Lioudmila Kortchguina (born 1971), Canadian marathon runner
- Pavel Korchagin, central character of the novel How the Steel Was Tempered and two films
- Sergei Korchagin (born 1975), Russian football player
- Viktor Korchagin (born 1967), Russian ski-orienteering competitor

== See also ==
- Yuri Korchagin field, an offshore oil field in the Russian sector of the Caspian Sea
