= Bavasan Abiduev =

Soviet children's writer, journalist, poet, translator (1909–1940)

Bavasan Dorzhievich Abiduev (1909–1940) was a Soviet poet of Buryat origin. He was born in the village of Yangazhin, Ivolginsky district of Buryatia. He is known as one of the founders of Buryat children's literature, to which he made very significant contributions during his short life and career. He became a member of the Communist Party of the Soviet Union in 1930.

His engagement with Buryat cultural, educational, social and political events began in his teens. In the spring of 1934, he became a member of the newly created Union of Writers of Buryatia. He was a journalist at the newspaper Buriaad-Mongoloy Onen. The poem "Airplane", written by him at the age of 19, became an event in the literary life of Buryatia. In 1931, his first book of poems, "Naranai tuyaa" (The Radiance of the Sun), was published. The second collection of poems "Bayar" (Joy) was published in 1938.

Abiduev's literary gifts were most fully realized in the works written for children. He was the author of fairy tales – "Shaalai Shaanai khoyor" (Shalai and Shanai) (1938), "Tekhe babanyn tokhe" (Brave goat of Baban) (1938), "Ereen gүrөөһe emeelegshe" (Riding a tiger) (1938), "Kotiy baatar" (1939), "Remsh" (The Bat) (1939), etc. These were published in Ulan-Ude, in multiple editions. The tales were also translated into Russian by V. Zamyatin, A. Shchitov, N. Damdinov, etc.

Abiduev was also regarded as a fine translator into the Buryat language. Notable works he translated were Nikolai Ostrovsky's works How the Steel Was Tempered and Born of the Storm, and Vladimir Mayakovsky's poems.

He died of a serious illness when he was only 31. His younger brother Dylyk was a hero of the Great Patriotic War.
