= Pavel Korchagin =

Pavel Korchagin is the protagonist of the Soviet novel How the Steel Was Tempered. It may also refer to:

- How the Steel Was Tempered (film), 1942 film adaptation
- Pavel Korchagin (film), 1956 film adaptation
