= Shvidler =

Shvidler (Cyrillic: Швидлер) is a Ukrainian and Russian surname. Notable people with the surname include:

- Eugene Shvidler (born 1964), Russian businessman
- Malvina Shvidler (1919–2011), Ukrainian actress
