= Mariya Fortus =

Soviet Jewish translator and intelligence officer

- Native name: Мария Фортус
- Born: Mariya Alexandrovna Fortus; 1900; Kherson, Russian Empire
- Died: 1981 (aged 80–81)
- Allegiance: Soviet Union
- Service years: 1917–1955
- Rank: Colonel
- Conflicts: Russian Civil War; Spanish Civil War; World War II
- Awards: Order of Lenin; Order of the Red Flag

Mariya Aleksandrovna Fortus (Russian: Мария Александровна Фортус; 1900–1980) was a Soviet Jewish translator and intelligence officer. She participated in the Russian Civil War, the Spanish Civil War, and World War II.

== Biography ==
Fortus was born in 1900 in Kherson to the family of a rich Jewish banker. Her father abandoned the family in 1913, forcing Mariya and her sister Adelaida to work. She would work as an embroiderer while studying in a local gymnasium for boys. In 1916 she would join the Socialist Revolutionary Party, before leaving it for the Bolsheviks in 1917 with whom she participated in the Russian Civil War.

Fortus married the Catalan anarchist Ramon Casanellas, who had fled to the Soviet Union as a refugee. Fortus and her husband spent time together in Spain, allowing her to develop a familiarity with the Spanish language and culture. This familiarity assisted her when she was appointed to a Soviet military delegation to Spain during the Spanish Civil War in 1936, where she served as a translator. While working in Spain, she used the false name Julia Jiménez Cárdenas. Fortus became an intelligence agent in World War II. She primarily operated in the Ukrainian SSR, where she trained other intelligence officers. She was also involved in operations in the Kingdom of Romania and the Kingdom of Hungary. Fortus received the Order of Lenin and the Order of the Red Flag for her service.

Upon her return to the Soviet Union in 1945, Fortus continued her military service. In 1955 she retired with the rank of colonel. She wrote her memoirs and, in the late 1950s, defended a thesis in the field of sociology. She died in 1981.

== Related media ==
In 1970, a two-part black and white film called Hail, Mary! that was based on Fortus's life was released, where she was portrayed by the actress Ada Rogovtseva.

She published a book in 1980 titled Zápisky rozvědčice, in English Notes of a Detective, where she described the events of the last year of World War II in Hungary and the liberation of Czechoslovakia and the preparations required for several of the operations.
