= Dmytro Miliutenko =

Dmytro Milyutenko PAU
- Born: 21 February 1899; Sloviansk, Russian Empire
- Died: 27 January 1966 (aged 66); Tashkent, Uzbek SSR, Soviet Union
- Occupation: Actor
- Years active: 1934–1966 (film)

Dmytro Milyutenko (Ukrainian: Дмитро Мілютенко; 21 February 1899 – 25 January 1966) was a Ukrainian stage and film actor of the Soviet era.

== Partial filmography ==
- Bolshaya igra (1934)
- Tom Soyer (1936)
- Karmeliuk (1938) - Yarjoma - Kovalya's son
- Shchors (1939) - Weaver / Vladimir Vinichenko
- Vsadniki (1939) - Guest at the reception (uncredited)
- Kubantsy (1940) - Grandfather Makar Ocheretov
- Bogdan Khmelnitskiy (1941) - Hetman Mykola Pototzky
- Partizany v stepyakh Ukrainy (1943) - Filimon Dovgonosik
- Zigmund Kolosovskiy (1946) - Deputy Ventsel
- Secret Agent (1947) - Berezhnoy
- Taras Shevchenko (1951) - Commander Irakty Aleksandrovich Uskov
- V stepakh Ukrajiny (1952)
- Martin Borulya (1953) - Protasiy Penenozhka
- Kalinovaya roshcha (1954)
- Bogatyr idyot v Marto (1954) - 'Khozyain'
- Mat (1956)
- Ivan Franko (1956) - Governor-general of Galicia
- Pavel Korchagin (1957) - Tokarev
- Sto tysjach (1958) - Gerasim Nikodimovich Kalitka
- Green Van (1959)
- Zelyonyy furgon (1960) - grandfather Taras
- Ivan's Childhood (1962) - Old Man
- V myortvoy petle (1963) - Dirin
- Sorok minut do rassveta (1963) - Demid Antonovich
- Nash chestnyy khleb (1964) - Makar Zadorozhnyy
- The Dream (1964) - Dyadko Ivan
- Eskadra ukhodit na zapad (1965) - Colonel Ferambe
- Net neizvestnykh soldat (1965) - Bimba
- A Spring for the Thirsty (1965) - Serdyuk
- Vnimaniyu grazhdan i organizatsiy (1966) - (final film role)

== Bibliography ==
- Neia Markovna Zorkaia. The illustrated history of the Soviet cinema. Hippocrene Books, 1989.
