= The Fourth Year of War =

- Russian: Шёл четвёртый год войны
- Directed by: Georgy Nikolaenko
- Written by: Aleksandr Belyayev; Georgy Nikolaenko
- Starring: Lyudmila Savelyeva; Nikolay Olyalin; Aleksandr Zbruev; Nikolay Eryomenko; Aleksandr Denisov
- Cinematography: Anatoliy Grishko
- Edited by: Semyon Klebanov; Natalya Loginova
- Music by: Vitali Filippenko
- Release date: 1983
- Running time: 85 minute
- Country: Soviet Union
- Language: Russian

The Fourth Year of War (Russian: Шёл четвёртый год войны, romanized: Shyol chetvyortyy god voyny) is a 1983 Soviet World War II film directed by Georgy Nikolaenko.

The film takes place in 1944. The Soviet command is preparing an offensive. A group of scouts led by Nadezhda Moroz will go to the area of the forest, which is under the protection of the Germans.

== Plot ==
In the fall of 1944, Colonel Nikolai Pavlov, head of army intelligence, is ordered to investigate mysterious German activity in a special operations zone located in a dense forest near the villages of Maryino and Grivny. With just three days to uncover the enemy’s plans, Pavlov sends a reconnaissance team, disguised as captured German field police, under the command of Captain Alexander Spirin. The mission takes a dangerous turn when the local village headman, Saveliy Khomutov, suspects their true identity, stabbing Captain Spirin in a confrontation. The scouts are forced to kill Khomutov and his collaborator son to continue their mission.

Critically wounded, Spirin hands command over to Captain Nadezhda Moroz, who splits the team—some attempt to bring Spirin back to Soviet lines, while Moroz leads the rest deeper into the German zone. After seizing a vehicle with German officers and a radio locator, Moroz learns of a German plan to flood the forest by destroying nearby dams, setting a deadly trap for advancing Soviet forces. Tragically, the scouts escorting Spirin are ambushed, and Spirin, refusing to be captured, detonates a grenade, sacrificing himself while taking out several German soldiers. Surrounded by the enemy, Moroz uses the captured German radio to broadcast details of the German plan in plain text, alerting Soviet forces and sabotaging the enemy’s operation, though at the cost of her team’s lives. Colonel Pavlov mourns deeply for his fallen comrades, whose sacrifice prevented a devastating ambush.

== Cast ==
- Lyudmila Savelyeva as Nadezhda Moroz
- Nikolay Olyalin as Nikolay Pavlov
- Aleksandr Zbruev as Aleksandr Spirin
- Nikolay Eryomenko as Antipov
- Aleksandr Denisov as Zhurba
- Timofey Spivak as Arthur
- Vyacheslav Baranov as Ptakhin
- Lev Durov as Saveliy Khomutov
- Vladimir Smirnov as Burenkov
- Aleksandr Lebedev as Egor Krasilnikov
