= The Shore (1984 film) =

- Russian: Берег
- Directed by: Aleksandr Alov; Vladimir Naumov
- Written by: Aleksandr Alov; Yuri Bondarev; Vladimir Naumov
- Produced by: Wolf-Dietrich Brücker
- Starring: Boris Shcherbakov; Natalya Belokhvostikova; Bernhard Wicki
- Cinematography: Valentin Zheleznyakov
- Edited by: Yelena Surazhskaya
- Music by: Aleksandr Goldshteyn
- Production companies: GMBH; Mosfilm
- Release date: 1984
- Running time: 141 min.
- Countries: Soviet Union; West Germany
- Language: Russian

The Shore (Russian: Берег, romanized: Bereg) is a 1984 Soviet-German romance film directed by Aleksandr Alov and Vladimir Naumov.

== Plot ==
Russian writer Vadim Nikitin, who goes to Hamburg and recalls the final battles of the Great Patriotic War and a young German woman named Emma, with whom he was in love. And suddenly, forty years later, he met her again.

== Cast ==
- Boris Shcherbakov as Vadim Nikitin
- Natalya Belokhvostikova as Emma Herbert
- Bernhard Wicki as Weber, Verleger
- Vladimir Gostyukhin as Mesenin
- Valery Storozhik as Knyazhko
- Mikhail Golubovich as Granaturov
- Vladimir Zamansky as Zykin
- Andrey Gusev as Uschatikov
- Armen Dzhigarkhanyan as Platon Petrovich
- Bruno Dietrich as Mr. Dietzman

== Awards ==
- 1984 — 17th All-Union Film Festival (Kiev): Grand Prix
- 1985 — USSR State Prize
