= Find me, Lyonya! =

- Russian: Найди меня, Лёня!
- Directed by: Nikolay Lebedev
- Written by: Boris Vakhtin
- Starring: Anna Aleksakhina; Larisa Baranova; Viktor Chekmaryov; Aleksandr Demyanenko; Sergey Dvoretskiy; Igor Efimov
- Cinematography: Semyon Ivanov
- Music by: Vladimir Maklakov
- Production company: Lenfilm
- Release date: 25 May 1972
- Running time: 88 min.
- Country: Soviet Union
- Language: Russian

Find me, Lyonya! (Russian: Найди меня, Лёня!) is a 1971 Soviet drama film directed by Nikolay Lebedev.

== Plot ==
Set in the pre-revolutionary years of 1910–1912 nearby the Volga city of Samara, the story follows the touching friendship between two children from opposite worlds. Dina Arsenyeva (Dinka) is the youngest daughter in a warm, intelligent family whose father has been arrested for revolutionary activity. Her mother works long hours, leaving Dinka and her sisters in the care of Aunt Katya. Restless, fiercely independent, and sensitive, eight-year-old Dina often lands in trouble—sneaking off alone, quarreling with boys, or nearly drowning during a reckless swim. She’s saved by Lyonya, a 12-year-old boy working on a barge owned by his cruel and exploitative stepfather.

Despite the vast difference in their backgrounds—Dina from a politically active household and Lyonya from a life of hardship and child labor—the two form a deep and loyal friendship. When Lyonya flees the barge to escape his stepfather’s abuse, Dinka does everything she can to help him, even selling fish at the market and performing with a street organ grinder to raise money. Inspired by Dina and her family's revolutionary efforts, Lyonya joins their cause, continuing the work of a recently arrested laborer by distributing political leaflets hidden inside bread rolls. Their adventures lead them through danger, betrayal, and loss, including Lyonya’s encounter with a police informant he must outwit.

As Dina’s family is forced to leave the village due to political pressure, she runs to the riverbank and shouts after Lyonya on a departing steamer: “We’re leaving! Find me, Lyonya!” The boy, moved by her parting words, devotes himself to the hope of finding his friend again, their childhood bond shaping the direction of both their lives.

== Cast ==
- Larisa Baranova as Dinka (Dina Arsenyeva)
- Andrei Trofimov as Lyonya
- Nina Veselovskaya as Marina Vladimirovna Arsenyeva, Dinka’s mother
- Viktor Chekmaryov as Gordey Zakharovich, Lyonya’s stepfather
- Aleksandr Demyanenko as the police informant
- Anatoly Puzyryov as Kostya
- Sergey Dvoretskiy as Sergey, Kostya's pal
- Igor Efimov as Stepan
- Aleksandr Afanasyev as Mitrich
- Vitya Elizarov as Troshka
- Andrei Gretsov as Minka
- Anna Aleksakhina as Myshka, Dinka’s middle sister
- Ira Venchikova as Alina, Dinka’s older sister
