= Teheran 43 =

- Soviet film poster
- Directed by: Alexander Alov; Vladimir Naumov
- Written by: Alexander Alov; Vladimir Naumov
- Produced by: Georges Cheyko
- Starring: Natalya Belokhvostikova; Igor Kostolevsky; Armen Dzhigarkhanyan; Alain Delon; Claude Jade
- Cinematography: Valentin Zheleznyakov
- Edited by: Catherine Kelber
- Music by: Georges Garvarentz, Mieczysław Weinberg
- Distributed by: Mosfilm (Soviet Union); SN Prodis; Océanic Films (France)
- Release date: July 1981
- Running time: 192 minutes
- Countries: Soviet Union; France; Switzerland
- Languages: Russian; French
- Box office: 47.5 million admissions (USSR); 94,335 admissions (France)

Teheran 43 (Russian: Тегеран-43; French: Téhéran 43, Nid d'espions) is a 1981 Soviet-French-Swiss political thriller film made by Mosfilm, Mediterraneo Cine and Pro Dis Film, directed by Aleksandr Alov and Vladimir Naumov. It is based on heavily fictionalized events around the Operation Long Jump, the alleged 1943 attempt by Nazi Germany to assassinate Winston Churchill, Joseph Stalin and Franklin Delano Roosevelt during the Tehran Conference.

The film was the leader of Soviet distribution in 1981 and had 47.5 million viewers. It won the Golden Prize at the 12th Moscow International Film Festival in 1981.

== Plot ==
Teheran 43 starts in 1980 in Paris. The memories of hero Andrei take the story back to 1943. The Germans planned to assassinate the three men 37 years later, and the German agent Max lives with Françoise, a young Parisian woman, who hides him. But another Nazi, Scherner, is hunting down Max who failed to carry out the planned assassinations. Max trusts Françoise but he does not know that she works for Scherner. Another plot in the movie is the romance between Andrei and the French woman Marie in 1943, followed in 1980.

Max Richard, an assassin of the Nazis, who was 37 years ago hired to assassinate Joseph Stalin, Winston Churchill and Franklin D. Roosevelt during the Tehran Conference, is holed up in today's Paris at the young French woman Françoise. In flashbacks, he describes Françoise who claims to be a neighbor in his apartment because she mistook the door, the assassination attempts. Max was brought in 1943 to Tehran as a funeral director of a previously murdered Persian. Max also kills the lawyer of the dead, Gérard Simon. But Simon's interpreter Marie and the young Russian Secret agent Andrei get him on the loose. The two have no time for romance but thwart the assassination. They can arrest a fake photographer. The man who posed as a photographer and cinematographer "Dennis Pew" had a gun in his movie camera. Andrei, who cares for the safety of the young woman, sends Marie, who is in love with him, to France. They do not see each other again.

When Max wants to publish his memoirs and documents in Paris today with the help of the lawyer Legraine, Andrei travels to Paris. At an auction of Max's documents in London, Andrej sees a young woman who is very similar to Marie. She is Marie's daughter Nathalie. Françoise, meanwhile Max's mistress, also pursues her own goals. She claims to work for his former client Scherner and to have spared Max only out of pity.

In Paris, the paths of Marie and Andreiand of Marie's daughter Nathalie and police inspector Foche, who chases the former masterminds around Scherner, intersect. During a plane hijacking initiated by Scherner, Andrei meets Nathalie again. Foche, who wants to protect Nathalie's mother, is assassinated in the back. Max gets scared when Marie is killed as a former witness after a short reunion with Andrei. Then, Françoise takes him to a new hiding place.

Andrei visits Nathalie and learns from her that Marie loved him all those years. She told her daughter about swimming together and told her about the dolphins, but those were just her dreams. In his new hideout, Max is shot by Scherner's men. Legraine interrogates Scherner and Françoise; possibly, he will negotiate with them about the manuscript. Andrei travels back to Moscow.

== Cast ==
- Natalya Belokhvostikova as Marie/Nathalie
- Igor Kostolevsky as Andrei
- Armen Dzhigarkhanyan as Max
- Alain Delon as Foche
- Claude Jade as Françoise
- Albert Filozov as Scherner
- Curd Jürgens as Legraine
- Nikolai Grinko as Hermolin
- Gleb Strizhenov as Simon
- Vsevolod Sanayev as Innkeeper
- Mike Marshall as Terrorist on Airplane
- Jess Hahn as Terrorist on Airplane
- Jacques Roux as Mr Johnson
- Evelyne Kraft as false secretary
- Natacha Naumova as Marie (child)

== Soundtrack ==
The music score for the movie was composed by Georges Garvarentz and Mieczysław Weinberg. Charles Aznavour's theme song "Une vie d'amour" became very popular in the Soviet Union which prompted the singer to record a Russian version titled Vechnaya lyubov (Eternal Love). Aznavour also sung the French version in duet with Mireille Matthieu.

== Release and reception ==
With 47.5 million admissions, the film was the most popular film of 1981 in the Soviet Union. It also won the Golden Prize at the 12th Moscow International Film Festival in 1981. It was a flop in France, having only 94,335 admissions.
