= Pavel Korchagin (film) =

- Russian: Павел Корчагин
- Directed by: Aleksandr Alov; Vladimir Naumov
- Written by: Konstantin Isaev; Nikolai Ostrovsky
- Starring: Vasily Lanovoy; Dmitri Milyutenko; Konstantin Stepankov; Ada Rogovtseva; Nikolai Grinko
- Cinematography: Ilya Minkovetsky; Suren Shakhbazyan
- Edited by: Anna Kulganek
- Music by: Yuri Shchurovsky
- Production company: Kiev Film Studio
- Release date: 1956
- Running time: 97 min.
- Country: Soviet Union
- Language: Russian

Pavel Korchagin (Russian: Павел Корчагин) is a 1956 Soviet drama film directed by Aleksandr Alov and Vladimir Naumov, based on the novel How the Steel Was Tempered.

The film tells about the Red Army soldier Pavel Korchagin and his comrades fighting for a just cause.

== Plot ==
Set in the 1920s and 1930s, the film tells the story of Pavel Korchagin, who is bedridden with a terminal illness. As he reflects on his life, memories of his youth come flooding back: his participation in the revolutionary struggle, battles against the White Poles, the grueling winter construction of a railway to save the city from cold and hunger, and the hardships of life during wartime communism. These recollections highlight his selfless labor, extreme exhaustion, and the harsh realities of that era, intertwined with the challenges of his difficult love life.

As his health deteriorates, Korchagin begins to lose his sight, a cruel blow that tests his resilience. Despite his failing vision, he remains determined to complete his memoirs, capturing the vivid and heroic episodes of his past for posterity. His unwavering dedication to finishing his book becomes a final testament to his indomitable spirit.

== Cast ==
- Vasily Lanovoy as Pavel Korchagin
- Tamara Stradina as Tonya Tumanova
- Elza Lezhdey as Rita Ustynovich
- Vladimir Marenkov as Ivan Zharky
- Pavel Usovnichenko as Zhukhrai
- Dmitri Milyutenko as Tokarev
- Aleksandr Lebedev as Nikolai Okunev
- Lev Perfilov as Franz Klavichek
- Viktor Stepanov as Vikhrasty
- Lidiya Piktorskaya as Korchagin's mother
- Konstantin Stepankov as Akim
- Ada Rogovtseva as Christina
- Valentina Telegina as moonshiner
- Nikolai Grinko as station chekist
- Yevgeny Morgunov as thief (uncredited)
