= The Frigid Sea =

- Russian: Море студеное
- Directed by: Yuri Yegorov
- Written by: Konstantin Badigin; Vladimir Kreps
- Produced by: Vladimir Maron
- Starring: Nikolay Kryuchkov; Valentin Grachyov; Gennadi Yudin; Elza Lezhdey; Mark Bernes; Aleksandr Pelevin
- Cinematography: Igor Shatrov
- Edited by: Ksenia Blinova
- Music by: Gavriil Popov
- Production company: Gorky Film Studio
- Release date: 1954
- Running time: 92 min.
- Country: Soviet Union
- Language: Russian

The Frigid Sea (Russian: Море студёное) is a 1954 Soviet drama film directed by Yuri Yegorov.

== Plot ==
Several Pomor fishermen were attacked by sea pirates and were forced to spend more than one year on a desert island. Many considered them dead but almost all of them managed to survive.

== Historical background ==
Prototypes of the film's heroes were four Russian hunters from Mezen, led by forage Aleksey Khimkov, who spent more than 6 years on the uninhabited island of Edgeøya in the southeastern part of the Spitsbergen archipelago, which in the Russian North was called Little Brun. Based on their stories, the French scientist Pierre Louis Leroy, who lived and worked in Russia, published in 1760 an essay.

== Cast ==
- Nikolay Kryuchkov as Aleksey Khimkov
- Valentin Grachyov as Vanya Khimkov, his son (as Valya Grachyov)
- Gennadi Yudin as Crewman Stepan Shaparov
- Elza Lezhdey as Varvara
- Mark Bernes as Okladnikov
- Aleksandr Pelevin as Vernizobar
- Georgi Chernovolenko as Capt. Van Glek
- Aleksandra Danilova as Nastya Khinkova
- Anatoly Kubatsky as Grandfather Nikifor
- Aleksandr Antonov as Amos Kornilov
- Igor Bezyayev
- Valentina Telegina as Terentyevna
- Nikolay Gorlov
- Yakov Khaletskiy
- Elena Kondrateva as Mat Varvary
- Mikhail Kuznetsov as Crewman Fedor Verigin
