= Leonid Zorin =

Russian playwright (1924–2020)

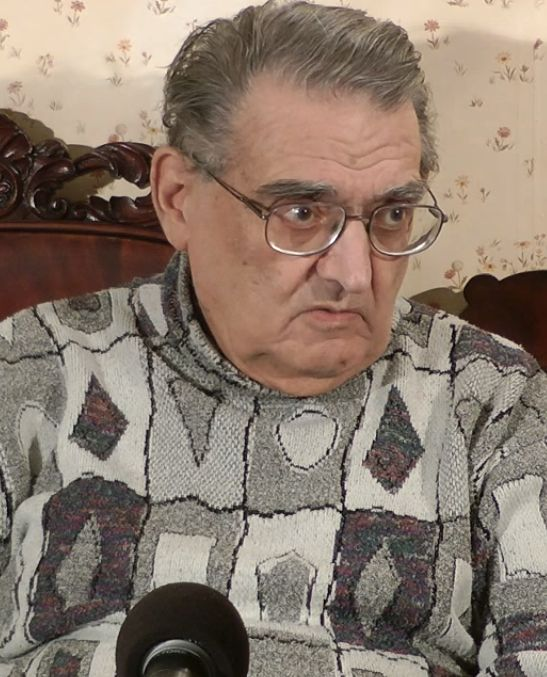
- Zorin in 2012
- Born: Leonid Genrikhovich Salzman; 3 November 1924; Baku, Transcaucasian Socialist Federative Soviet Republic, Soviet Union
- Died: 31 March 2020 (aged 95); Moscow, Russia

Leonid Genrikhovich Zorin (Russian: Леонид Генрихович Зорин; 3 November 1924 – 31 March 2020) was a Russian playwright. He was born in Baku, Soviet Union, and studied at Azerbaijan University and at the Maxim Gorky Literature Institute in Moscow. He is the author of plays and screenplays. His most performed work is A Warsaw Melody (1967).

== Selected filmography ==
- 20,000 Leagues Across the Land (1960)
- Peace to Him Who Enters (1961)
- The Man from Nowhere (1961)
- Friends and Years (1965)
- The Ugly Story (1966)
- Stopwatch (1970)
- Grandmaster (1972)
- Kind Men (1979)
- The Transit (1982)
- The Pokrovsky Gate (1982)
- Royal Hunt (1990)
