= Straight Line (film) =

- Russian: Прямая линия
- Directed by: Yuri Shvyryov
- Written by: Vladimir Makanin
- Starring: Lyudmila Dolgorukova; Oleg Efremov; Sergei Gololobov; Evgeniy Lebedev; Elza Lezhdey
- Cinematography: Vladimir Arkhangelskiy
- Music by: Bogdan Trotsyuk
- Release date: 1967
- Country: Soviet Union
- Language: Russian

Straight Line (Russian: Прямая линия) is a 1967 Soviet drama film directed by Yuri Shvyryov.

== Plot ==
Set in the mid-1960s in the USSR, the film tells the story of Vladimir Belov, a 23-year-old physicist working at a classified research institute involved in atomic testing. Under the leadership of the esteemed scientist Neslezkin, who lost his family during World War II, Belov’s team successfully develops a groundbreaking weapon. However, during testing at a military range, two soldiers tragically lose their lives, casting a shadow over the project’s success.

Belov’s colleague, Valentina Antonovna Zorich, accuses him of errors that may have contributed to the incident. While most staff dismiss her claims, Belov is deeply shaken by guilt. He is sent to the testing ground to investigate the cause of the deaths and confront his role in the tragedy. There, the facility’s director reassures him, attributing the deaths to the soldiers' own negligence—they had been smoking in a prohibited area.

== Cast ==
- Lyudmila Dolgorukova as Natasha
- Oleg Efremov as Colonel
- Sergei Gololobov as Kostya Knyazegradski
- Evgeniy Lebedev as Neslezkin (as Yevgeni Lebedev)
- Elza Lezhdey as Emma
- Aleksey Mironov
- Rodion Nahapetov as Volodya Belov (as Rodion Nakhapetov)
- Sofiya Pilyavskaya as Zorich
- Yuriy Puzyryov as Pyotr Yakovlevich
- Lyubov Sokolova as Khudyekova
