= Little Tragedies (film) =

1979 Soviet TV miniseries

- Written by: Mikhail Schweitzer
- Directed by: Mikhail Schweitzer
- Starring: Matluba Alimova; Natalya Belokhvostikova; Nikolai Burlyayev
- Music by: Alfred Schnittke
- Country of origin: Soviet Union
- Original language: Russian

Production
- Cinematography: Mikhail Agranovich
- Editors: Natalia Alfyorova; Zoya Veryovkina
- Running time: 215 minutes
- Production company: Mosfilm

Original release
- Release: June 1979 – July 1979

Little Tragedies (Russian: Маленькие трагедии, romanized: Malenkie tragedii) is a 1979 Soviet television miniseries directed by Mikhail Schweitzer, based on works by Alexander Pushkin. Dedicated to Pushkin's 180th birthday and 150th anniversary of Boldino Autumn, it was Vladimir Vysotsky's last movie role.

== Pushkin's works used ==
- Scene from Faust
- Little Tragedies
  - Mozart and Salieri (play)
  - The Covetous Knight
  - The Stone Guest (play)
  - A Feast in Time of Plague (play)
- Egyptian Nights
- Гости съезжались на дачу…
- На углу маленькой площади…
- Мы проводили вечер на даче…
- Жил на свете рыцарь бедный…

== Cast ==
- Matluba Alimova as Laura
- Natalya Belokhvostikova as Donna Anna
- Nikolai Burlyayev as Alber, young Baron
- Natalya Danilova as Princess Volskaya
- Lidiya Fedoseyeva-Shukshina as Ekaterina Pavlovna
- Inna Gulaya as Queen of the Night
- Ivars Kalniņš as Faust and Don Carlos (voiced by Sergei Malishevsky)
- Leonid Kayurov as Alexey Ivanovich
- Nikolai Kochegarov as Mephistopheles (voiced by Igor Yasulovich) and one of Laura's guests
- Mikhail Kokshenov as Ivan, servant
- Leonid Kuravlyov as Leporello, servant of Don Juan
- Ivan Lapikov as Priest
- Avangard Leontiev as Solomon
- Grigory Malikov (episode)
- Radner Muratov (episode)
- Svetlana Pereladova as Mary
- Filipp Smoktunovsky as Duke (voiced by Igor Yasulovich)
- Innokenty Smoktunovsky as Salieri and Old Baron
- Georgy Taratorkin as Charsky
- Aleksandr Trofimov as Chairman
- Larisa Udovichenko as Alber's fiance and Louise
- Vladimir Vysotsky as Don Juan
- Sergei Yursky as Improvisator
- Valeri Zolotukhin as Mozart
