= The Viper (1965 film) =

1965 film by Viktor Ivchenko

- Russian: Гадюка
- Directed by: Viktor Ivchenko
- Written by: Grigoriy Koltunov; Aleksei Tolstoy
- Starring: Ninel Myshkova; Boris Seidenberg; Ivan Mykolaichuk; Rayisa Nedashkivska; Aleksandr Movchan
- Cinematography: Mikhail Chyorny
- Music by: German Zhukovsky
- Production company: Dovzhenko Film Studios
- Release date: 1965
- Running time: 100 minnutes
- Country: Soviet Union
- Language: Russian

The Viper (Russian: Гадюка) is a 1965 Soviet historical drama film directed by Viktor Ivchenko based on the novella of the same name by Aleksey Tolstoy.

== Plot ==
The film follows Olga Zotova, the daughter of a merchant, who joins the Red Army as a very young woman during the Russian Civil War. Hardened by brutal trials and front-line battles, she proves herself to be a brave and capable soldier. However, when the war ends, Olga faces an even greater challenge—adjusting to peaceful civilian life. Despite her strength and courage, she struggles to find her place in a world no longer defined by conflict.

== Cast ==
- Ninel Myshkova
- Boris Seidenberg
- Ivan Mykolaichuk
- Rayisa Nedashkivska
- Aleksandr Movchan
- Konstantin Stepankov
- Sergei Lyakhnitsky
- Vladimir Dalsky
- Anna Nikolayeva
- Malvina Shvidler
