= Miracle in the Land of Oblivion =

Miracle in the Land of Oblivion (Ukrainian: «Чудо в краю забуття») is a 1991 Soviet film directed by Natalia Motuzko. It is based on the story of Valery Shevchuk "Petro Utekliy".

== Plot ==
Miracle in the Land of Oblivion is the story of the murder of two twin brothers, whom the villagers consider to be one person. Out of fear that the Messiah will come and do a terrible judgment, people commit new crimes.

== Cast ==
- Valentin Trotsyuk — Deacon
- Anatoly Hostikoev — Chancellor
- Rayisa Nedashkivska — Vyutska
- Konstantin Stepankov — Centurion
- Oleg Savkin — Find
- Klimene Nele — Lydia Levaida
- Alexander Movchan — Simon Levaida
- Taras Denisenko — Ivan Dyachenko
- Lev Perfilov — Starosta
- Stanislav Lisny — Khoma Bida
