= Aleksandr Alov =

Soviet film director and screenwriter

- Александр Алов
- Born: Aleksandr Aleksandrovich Lapsker; 26 September 1923; Kharkiv, Ukrainian SSR, Soviet Union
- Died: 12 June 1983 (aged 59); Moscow, Soviet Union
- Occupations: Film director, screenwriter
- Notable work: Teheran 43 (1981)
- Title: People's Artist of the USSR (1983)

Aleksandr Aleksandrovich Alov (Note: Russian: Александр Александрович Алов) (né Lapsker; (Note: Russian: Лапскер) September 26, 1923 – June 12, 1983) was a Soviet film director and screenwriter, he was granted the honorary title of People's Artist of the USSR in 1983 (together with Vladimir Naumov). His 1981 film Teheran 43 won the Golden Prize at the 12th Moscow International Film Festival.

== Biography ==
After military service in the Great Patriotic War, Alov studied with Igor Savchenko at VGIK, graduating in 1951. He worked as an assistant to Savchenko on the war epic The Third Blow (1948). After his teacher’s untimely death, he and fellow student Vladimir Naumov were entrusted with completing Savchenko’s last picture, the biopic Taras Shevchenko (1949). Following the success of that debut, Alov and Naumov began to make films at the Kiev film studio as a team under the label “Alov and Naumov”.

Restless Youth (1954), their first film, is about Ukrainian Komsomol members who successfully defeat an incompetent administrator. Pavel Korchagin (1956), adapted from Nikolai Ostrovsky’s novel How the Steel Was Tempered (1932), is about a soldier who is injured in the Russian Civil War. The third installment of this loose trilogy about Soviet youth, The Wind (1958), was made after Alov and Naumov’s 1957 move to Mosfilm Studio. It tells the story of four friends’ sojourn to the first Komsomol Congress in Moscow.

The film, which would end up being the most popular work by Alov and Naumov, was The Flight (1970), an adaptation of Mikhail Bulgakov’s tragedy about the 1918–1921 Civil War and subsequent mass emigration.

== Filmography ==
Note: all films are co-directed with Vladimir Naumov

- Taras Shevchenko (1951)
- Restless Youth (1954)
- Pavel Korchagin (1957)
- The Wind (1959)
- Peace to Him Who Enters (1961)
- The Coin (1965)
- The Ugly Story (1966)
- The Flight (1970)
- Legend About Thiel (1976)
- Teheran 43 (1981)
- The Shore (1984)
