= The Ugly Story =

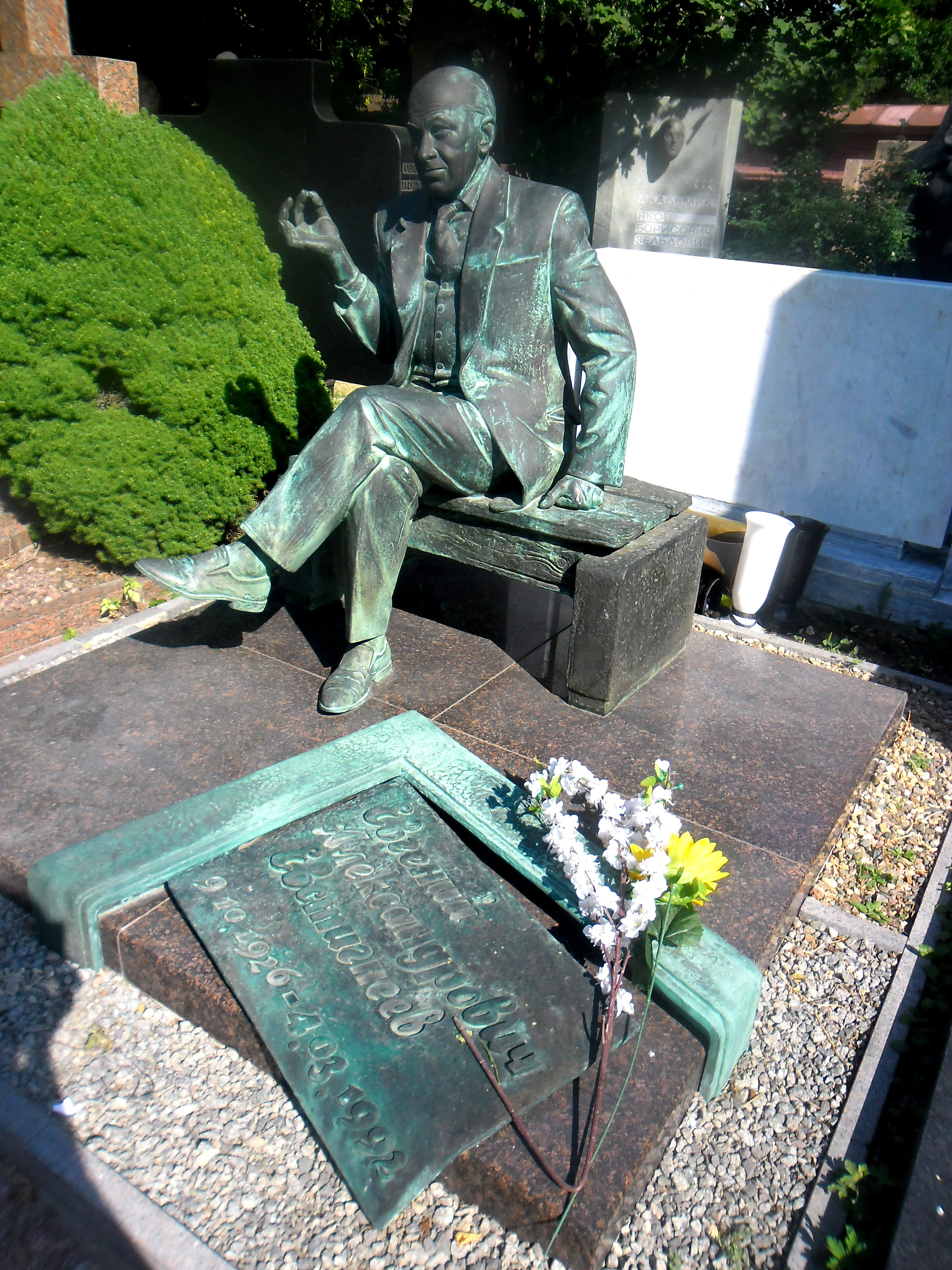
- Russian: Скверный анекдот
- Directed by: Aleksandr Alov; Vladimir Naumov
- Written by: Aleksandr Alov; Fyodor Dostoevsky; Vladimir Naumov; Leonid Zorin
- Produced by: Ilya Gurman
- Starring: Yevgeny Yevstigneyev
- Cinematography: Anatoly Kuznetsov
- Edited by: Tamara Zubrova
- Music by: Nikolai Karetnikov
- Production company: Mosfilm
- Release date: 1966
- Running time: 102 min.
- Country: Soviet Union
- Language: Russian

The Ugly Story (Russian: Скверный анекдот, romanized: Skvernyy anekdot) is a 1966 Soviet comedy film directed by Aleksandr Alov and Vladimir Naumov.

The film was not released and was banned. According to one version, the only negative of the film was secretly taken out of the studio and kept at home by composer Nikolai Karetnikov. It was first shown to the public in 1987.

== Plot ==
The actual state adviser Ivan Ilyich Pralinsky had the idea that if he is humane, then people will love him, they will believe him, and therefore they will believe in state reform and will love it. Consequently, his personal qualities acquire important social significance.

On a winter evening, while he was a guest, Ivan Ilyich, without waiting for the crew, went home on foot and accidentally went out to the house of Pseldonimov, one of his small servants. A wedding was celebrated there, and the general, full of noble intentions, went to congratulate the young.

== Cast ==
- Yevgeny Yevstigneyev as Pralinsky
- Viktor Sergachyov as Pseldonimov
- Aleksandr Gruzinsky as Mlekopitayev
- Elena Ponsova as Mlekopitayeva
- Elizaveta Nikishchikhina as Bride
- Zoya Fyodorova as Pseldonimov's mother
- Gleb Strizhenov as Klerk
- Pavel Pavlenko as Akim Petrovich
