= Peace to Him Who Enters =

- Directed by: Aleksandr Alov; Vladimir Naumov
- Written by: Aleksandr Alov; Vladimir Naumov; Leonid Zorin
- Starring: Lidiya Shaporenko; Aleksandr Demyanenko; Andrei Fajt; Nikolai Grinko; Viktor Avdyushko
- Cinematography: Anatoly Kuznetsov
- Edited by: Nadezhda Anikeyeva
- Music by: Nikolai Karetnikov
- Production company: Mosfilm (USSR)
- Release dates: 4 September 1961 (USSR); 23 November 1963 (U.S.)
- Running time: 90 minutes
- Country: Soviet Union
- Language: Russian

Peace to Him Who Enters (Russian: Мир входящему, romanized: Mir vkhodyashchemu) is a 1961 Soviet war drama film written and directed by Aleksandr Alov and Vladimir Naumov. Set in World War II, it tells the story of three Soviet soldiers who try to rescue a trapped pregnant German woman by taking her on a dangerous drive to a hospital.

== Plot ==
Lieutenant Ivlev from the Red Army who has just graduated from school, arrives for duty in Berlin a few days before the surrender of Germany in World War II. In the city destroyed by conflict, the soldiers find a pregnant woman, a German. The commanders of their division decide to help her get to the hospital. Lieutenant Ivlev is charged to accompany the pregnant German woman to the rear, giving him a chauffeur and a shell-shocked soldier, who also need to be sent to the hospital. Thus, senior officers want to save the new lieutenant from possible destruction in Berlin at the end of the war.

As a result of the long and arduous journey, the protagonist has matured and become a completely different person. Along with the driver, a soldier of the American army he met along the way, they help the German woman, bringing her to a safe place. The war ends, marked by the birth of a baby in a new, peaceful world. The final shot is of a newborn infant urinating on a pile of now unnecessary, discarded weapons.

== Cast ==
- Viktor Avdyushko as Ivan Yamshchikov
- Aleksandr Demyanenko as Shura Ivlev
- Stanislav Khitrov as Pavel Vasilyevich Rukavitsyn
- Lidiya Shaporenko as Barbara, German
- Vera Bokadoro as French
- Nikolai Grinko as American driver
- Nikolai Timofeyev as battalion commander
- Izolda Izvitskaya as Klava, traffic controller
- Andrei Fajt as Serbian
- Aleksandr Kuznetsov as Slava (uncredited)
- Stepan Krylov as Lieutenant Colonel Chernyayev
- Vladimir Marenkov as foreman
- Erwin Knausmüller as German officer
- Nikolai Khryashchikov as wounded man in Zwickau (uncredited)

== Awards ==
The film received the Special Jury Prize for Best Director and the Pasinetti Award (prize of Italian critics for the best foreign film) at the 22nd Venice International Film Festival.
