= Aleksandr Demyanenko =

Soviet and Russian actor (1937–1999)

- Александр Демьяненко
- Demyanenko in the 1960s
- Born: May 30, 1937; Sverdlovsk, Russian SFSR, Soviet Union
- Died: August 22, 1999 (aged 62); Saint Petersburg, Russia
- Occupation: Actor
- Spouses: Marina Sklyarova; Liudmila Demyanenko
- Children: Angelica Nevolina (adopted)
- Awards: People's Artist of the RSFSR (1991)

Aleksandr Sergeyevich Demyanenko (Russian: Александр Сергеевич Демьяненко; May 30, 1937 – August 22, 1999) was a Soviet and Russian actor, People's Artist of the RSFSR (1991). He is best known for playing the character Shurik in Leonid Gaidai's movies.

== Life and career ==
=== Early life ===
Demyanenko was born in Sverdlovsk, Soviet Union in 1937. Aleksandr's mother, Galina Belkova, was an accountant. His father, Sergei Petrovich Demyanenko, was an actor who graduated from the Lunacharsky State Institute for Theatre Arts. Sergei later worked as a director at the Sverdlovsk Opera Theatre, and as a child Aleksandr played bit parts at the theatre. Aleksandr attended a theater workshop at the Palace of Culture and parallel to that he studied piano at a music school. He also learned foreign languages with an emphasis on German in middle school and in high school started to sing in a baritone. In 1954, he began to study jurisprudence at the Sverdlovsk University of Law, but was expelled from the first semester for skipping lessons. In 1954, he failed to get into the Moscow Art Theatre, however in 1955, he was accepted both at the Lunacharsky State Institute for Theatre Arts and at the Boris Shchukin Theatre Institute in Moscow. He ended up choosing Lunacharsky.

=== Acting career ===
In 1959, he was cast in the film The Wind. The same year he graduated from the Lunacharsky State Institute for Theatre Arts theatre acting school. He then worked in the Mayakovsky Theatre in Moscow. In 1959, he starred in Everything Begins with Hitting the Road.

In 1961, Aleksandr Demyanenko moved to Leningrad and became staff actor at Lenfilm studio. There he starred in the film Grown-Up Children. He then went on to play in A Night Before Christmas, Peace to Him Who Enter and was cast for the title role in Dima Gorin's Career. In 1962, he starred in A Trip Without a Load and Bang the Drum. In 1963, he starred in Cheka Employee, The First Trolleybus and Cain XVIII. In 1964, he starred in The Returned Music and State Offender.

In 1965, he was cast for the role of Shurik in the classic Soviet comedy Operation Y and Shurik's Other Adventures. This role earned Demyanenko the image of nerdy student Shurik ("Shurik" being a diminutive form of the name Aleksandr). In 1967 he starred in the semi-sequel to the film Kidnapping, Caucasian Style. In 1967, he starred in the film War Under the Roofs and in 1968, in The Dead Season. In 1969, he starred in Tomorrow, April 3 and The Ugryum River. In 1971, he starred in Dauria. In 1972, he starred in Hello and Goodbye and The Singing Teacher.

In 1973, he once again reunited with Leonid Gaidai to star in the film Ivan Vasilievich Changes his Profession where he played a scientist named Shurik who invents a time machine. Demyanenko was unable to gain popularity for other roles as he was typecast as a scientist due to his tremendous popularity as the nerdy, crime-fighting student Shurik. He frequently provided voice-overs for foreign and domestic films, and even Donatas Banionis admitted that his dubbing was an improvement over his original acting.

=== Later years ===
He appeared in the television movie Old Songs of the Main Things 2 in 1997 playing an aged Shurik. He had a brief role in the TV series Strawberry and reprised his famous role of the nerdy professor in Old Songs of the Main Things 3 in 1998.

He was diagnosed with congestive heart failure but was afraid of getting bypass surgery. In 1999, Aleksandr Demyanenko died from a heart attack. Some analysts say this played a part in the success of the Communist Party of the Russian Federation in the December 1999 elections as the lack of a social welfare system was frequently blamed for his death.

== Personal life ==
His first marriage was to Marina Sklyarova with whom he went to acting classes. He divorced Sklyarova when he became involved with voice-over director from Lenfilm Liudmila Demyanenko. She became his second wife and they remained married until his death. He became the stepfather to her daughter Angelica Nevolina, who later became an actress.

== Filmography ==
- The Wind (1959) as Mitya
- Five Days, Five Nights (1960) as soldier
- Adult Children (1961) as Igor Nikolayevich Vinogradov
- Dima Gorin's Career (1961) as Dima Gorin
- Peace to Him Who Enters (1961) as Alexander Ivlev
- A Trip Without a Load (1962) as Pavel Sirotkin
- Cain XVIII (1963) as Ian
- State Criminal (1964) as Andrei Nikolayevich Polikanov
- Operation Y and Shurik's Other Adventures (1965) as Shurik
- Kidnapping, Caucasian Style (1967) as Shurik
- My good Dad (1970) as Dad
- Find me, Lyonya! (1971)
- Dauria (1971) as executioner
- My God, Ilya! (1972) as Ilya
- Failure of Engineer Garin (1973) as episode (uncredited)
- Ivan Vasilievich: Back to the Future (1973) as Shurik
- Strange Adults (1974) as Nalivaiko
- The Last Winter Day (1974)
- Unique (1975) as scientist
- Eleven Hopes (1975) as Volodya
- Crane in the Sky (1977) as Andrei Zabolotny
- A Moment Decides Everything (1978) as Nikolai Ivanovich Martynov
- Chest of Drawers Was Lead Through the Street... (1978) as Misha
- The Nightingale (1979) as Mekhanikus
- Die Fledermaus (1979) as lawyer Blindt
- The Useless Girl (1980) as Viktor Tikhonov
- Comrade Innokenty (1981)
- It Was Beyond the Narva Gate (1981)
- An Awful Day (1982)
- My Love: A Revolution (1982)
- The Green Van (1983) as Viktor Prokofievich Shestakov
- Echo of a Distant Blast (1983) as Albert Valdaitsev
- Stories of an Old Magician (1984) as cannibal
- Dear, Dearest, Beloved, Unique... (1984) as police captain
- A Prophetic Dream, or Suitcase (1985) as uncle of Pavel
- Bright Personality (1988) as doctor Spravchenko
- Tamara Aleksandrovna's Husband and Daughter (1988) as uncle Slava
- A Game for Millions (1991) as Roman Zhukov
- And to Hell with Us (1991) as Andrei Andreevich
- The White Clothes (1991) as Parai
- Seven-Forty (1992) as Viktor Pavlovich

== Dubbing ==
Live-action

- The 13th Warrior – Melchisidek (Omar Sharif)
- Armageddon – Rockhound (Steve Buscemi)
- The Assassination – Michael Howard (Roy Scheider)
- The Client – Assistant District Attorney Thomas Fink (Bradley Whitford)
- Cocoon – Bernie Lefkowitz (Jack Gilford)
- Con Air – Garland "The Marietta Mangler" Greene (Steve Buscemi)
- Enemy of the State – Thomas Brian Reynolds (Jon Voight)
- Face/Off – Victor Lazarro (Harve Presnell)
- Falling Down – Sergeant Martin Prendergast (Robert Duvall)
- A Few Good Men – Lieutenant Sam Weinberg (Kevin Pollak)
- The Fugitive – Dr. Charles Nichols (Jeroen Krabbé)
- The Great Race – The Great Leslie (Tony Curtis)
- The Importance of Being Earnest – Algernon Moncrieff (Michael Denison)
- JFK – Jack Martin (Jack Lemmon)
- Lethal Weapon 3 – Captain Ed Murphy (Steve Kahan)
- The Lion in Winter – Geoffrey (John Castle)
- Le Magnifique – François Merlin / Bob Saint-Clar (Jean-Paul Belmondo)
- The Man in the Iron Mask – Nicolas Fouquet (Patrick McGoohan)
- The Marrying Man – Lew Horner (Robert Loggia)
- Mary Shelley's Frankenstein – The Creation (Robert De Niro)
- Mayerling – Archduke Rudolf (Omar Sharif)
- Mighty Joe Young – Dr. Elliot Baker (Lawrence Pressman)
- The Mirror Crack'd – Martin N. Fenn (Tony Curtis)
- My Favorite Martian – Mr. Channing (Michael Lerner)
- Nothing to Lose – Phillip "P.B." Barrow (Michael McKean)
- The Prince and the Pauper – The Duke of Norfolk (Rex Harrison)
- The Rainmaker – Leo F. Drummond (Jon Voight)
- Showgirls – Sam Karlman (Al Ruscio)
- There's Something About Mary – Sully (Jeffrey Tambor)
- Under Siege – Tom Breaker (Nick Mancuso)
- Wall Street – Sir Larry Wildman (Terence Stamp)
- While You Were Sleeping – Saul Tuttle (Jack Warden)

Animation

- A Bug's Life – Manny
- Hercules – Zeus
- Mulan – The Emperor of China
- The Swan Princess – Sir Rothbart
- The Swan Princess: Escape from Castle Mountain – Sir Clavius
- Tarzan – Professor Archimedes Q. Porter
