= Legal Marriage =

- Russian: Законный брак
- Directed by: Albert S. Mkrtchyan
- Written by: Afanasi Belov
- Starring: Natalya Belokhvostikova; Igor Kostolevskiy; Albina Matveyeva; Ernst Romanov; Bulat Okudzhava
- Cinematography: Mikhail Koroptsov
- Edited by: Lyudmila Feyginova
- Music by: Isaac Schwarts
- Release date: 1985
- Running time: 93 minute
- Country: Soviet Union
- Language: Russian

Legal Marriage (Russian: Законный брак, romanized: Zakonniy brak) is a 1985 Soviet war romance film directed by Albert S. Mkrtchyan.

The film tells about an actor who decides to help a sick girl go home to the capital and for this they enter into a fictitious marriage. And suddenly they begin to realize that they love each other.

== Plot ==
Young people meet in Tashkent at the beginning of World War II. Igor Voloshin, an actor with a Moscow theater company evacuated to Central Asia, is a strikingly handsome man filled with energy, eager to join the front. Olga, a music teacher working as a nurse, is weak with malaria and struggling with the harsh climate, longing to return to her parents' apartment in Moscow, now only accessible with special permits. A gentle affection develops between them, and, moved by compassion for his ailing friend with no other way back to Moscow, Igor marries Olga in a sham arrangement to facilitate her return.

As they travel, the two miss their train and experience a series of romantic misadventures amid the landscapes of Central Asia. Once in Moscow, Olga discovers that her family home has been destroyed by bombing. Igor offers her a place to stay in his apartment, while he goes to live with his sister. Soon, they both find they are reluctant to follow through with their planned divorce, realizing over time that they can't live without each other. Just as they are ready to embrace a life together, war intervenes—Igor leaves for the front and is killed in action, shattering their future.

== Cast ==
- Natalya Belokhvostikova
- Igor Kostolevskiy
- Albina Matveyeva as Filatova (as A. Matveyeva)
- Ernst Romanov as Theatre director
- Bulat Okudzhava
- Elena Sanaeva
- Mikhail Neganov
- Aleksandr Shvorin
- Vladimir Sedov
- Nikolai Prokopovich
