= How the Steel Was Tempered (film) =

1942 Soviet drama film directed by Mark Donskoy

- Entire film
- Russian: Как закалялась сталь
- Directed by: Mark Donskoy
- Written by: Mark Donskoy
- Based on: How the Steel Was Tempered by Nikolai Ostrovsky
- Starring: V. Perest-Petrenko; Irina Fedotova
- Cinematography: Bentsion Monastyrsky
- Music by: Lev Shvarts
- Release date: 1942
- Running time: 76 minute
- Country: Soviet Union

How the Steel Was Tempered (Russian: Как закалялась сталь) is a 1942 Soviet drama film directed by Mark Donskoy.

== Plot ==
The film is based on the eponymous novel by Nikolai Ostrovsky.

== Cast ==
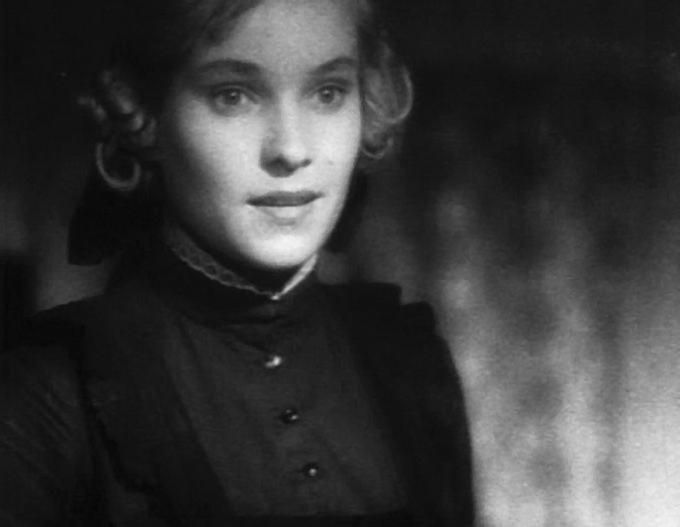
Irina Fedotova as Tonya

- V. Perest-Petrenko as Pavel Korchagin
- Irina Fedotova as Tonya
- Daniil Sagal as Zhukhrai - Sailor
- Nikolai Bubnov as Artem Korchagin (as N. Bubnov)
- Aleksandr Khvylya as Dolinnik
- Boris Runge as Seryozhka
- Vladimir Balashov as Victor Leschinsky
- Wladyslaw Krasnowiecki as German Officer (as V. Krasnovitsky)
- Anton Dunajsky as Ukrainian Interpreter
- Nikolai Voloshin

== Cultural significance ==
How the Steel was Tempered was a frequent cultural reference point for workers during China's Third Front construction campaign to develop basic industry and national defense industry in China's interior.
