= The Wind (1959 film) =

- Russian: Ветер
- Directed by: Aleksandr Alov; Vladimir Naumov
- Written by: Aleksandr Alov; Vladimir Naumov
- Starring: Eduard Bredun; Tamara Loginova; Elza Lezhdey; Aleksandr Demyanenko; Aleksey Krychenkov
- Cinematography: Fyodor Dobronravov
- Edited by: Yeva Ladyzhenskaya
- Music by: Nikolay Karetnikov
- Release date: March 16, 1959
- Running time: 99 minutes
- Country: Soviet Union
- Language: Russian

The Wind (Russian: Ветер) is a 1959 Soviet war drama film directed by Aleksandr Alov and Vladimir Naumov.

== Plot ==
The film takes place during the civil war in a small town located in the south of Russia, which was captured by the White Guards. The film tells about a group of guys who decide to participate in the first Congress of the Union of Workers and Peasants Youth, held in Moscow. They have a long and difficult road ahead...

== Cast ==
- Eduard Bredun as Fedor
- Tamara Loginova as Nastya
- Elza Lezhdey as Mari
- Aleksandr Demyanenko as Mitya
- Aleksey Krychenkov
- Ivan Aleksandrov
- Anatoliy Romashin
- N. Soloshchenko
- Viktoriya Radunskaya
- Yury Yakovlev as Leonid Zakrevskiy (as Yu. Yakovlev)
