= Elza Lezhdey =

Soviet and Russian actress

Elza Ivanovna Lezhdey (Russian: Эльза Ивановна Леждей; 19 February 1933 — 12 June 2001) was a Soviet and Russian actress. She was best recognized for her role as Zinaida Kibrit in Investigation Held by ZnaToKi. Appearing in more than fifty films from 1954 to 1992, she was awarded Honored Art Worker of the RSFSR in 1974.

She died on June 12, 2001, at the age of 68.

== Filmography ==
- The Frigid Sea (1954) as Varvara
- The First Echelon (1955) as Tamara
- Pavel Korchagin (1956) as Rita Ustinovich
- The Wind (1959) as Mari
- Ballad of a Soldier (1959) as Vasya's wife
- The Hockey Players (1965) as Maya
- Straight Line (1967) as Emma
- Investigation Held by ZnaToKi (1971-1989) as Zinaida Kibrit
