= Valery Storozhik =

Soviet and Russian actor

Valery Stepanovich Storozhik (Russian: Вале́рий Степа́нович Сторо́жик; born 7 December 1956, Kotelva, Poltava Oblast, Ukrainian SSR, USSR) is a Soviet and Russian stage, voice and film actor. He was awarded title of Honored Artist of the Russian Federation (1995).

Storozhik was the first Russian performer of the role of Jesus in the adaptation of the rock opera Jesus Christ Superstar (Mossovet Theatre, directed by Pavel Khomsky).

== Selected filmography ==
- 1982 — Fairy tales... fairy tales... fairy tales of the old Arbat as Lev Aleksandrovich Gartvig
- 1983 — The Story of Voyages as May
- 1983 — The Shore as Knyazhko
- 1986 — Boris Godunov as prince Dmitry Kurbsky
- 1993 — Split as Sergei Zubatov
- 1998 — Day of the Full Moon as Oleg Nikolayevich
- 2025 — Konstantinopol as Prince Konstantin Read
