= Konstantin Stepankov =

Ukrainian actor

People's Artist (USSR, Ukraine) Kostiantyn Stepankov
- Костянтин Степанков
- Born: Kostiantyn Petrovich Voloshchuk; 3 June 1928; Pechesky, Ukrainian SSR, Soviet Union
- Died: 22 July 2004 (aged 76); Kyiv, Ukraine
- Education: Karpenko-Karyi Memorial National University of Theatrical Arts
- Occupation: Actor
- Years active: 1958–1999
- Spouse: Ada Rohovtseva
- Awards: Lenin's Komsomol Prize of UkrSSR (1975); Oleksandr Dovzhenko State Prize, Ukraine (2003)

Kostiantyn Petrovich Stepankov (Ukrainian: Костянтин Петрович Степанков, by name of Kostiantyn Petrovich Voloshchuk; 3 June 1928 – 22 July 2004) was a Soviet and Ukrainian actor. He appeared in more than fifty films between 1958 and 1999. He was a member of the jury at the 11th Moscow International Film Festival.

== Biography ==
Kostiantyn Stepankov was born in Pechesky, a village in western Ukraine's Khmelnytskyi Oblast, to the family of a priest. From 1950 to 1953 he studied at the Karpenko-Karyi Memorial Kyiv Institute of Theatrical Arts

== Selected filmography ==
- Pavel Korchagin (1956)
- The Dream (1964)
- The Viper (1965)
- The Stone Cross (1968)
- Annychka (1968)
- Commisars (1970)
- The White Bird Marked with Black (1970)
- Zakhar Berkut (1971)
- Maryna (1974)
- How the Steel Was Tempered (1975)
- Hatred (1975)
- Babylon XX (1979)
- The Gadfly (1980)
- Dudaryky (1980)
- Yaroslav Mudry (1982)
- The Legend of Princess Olga (1983)
- Battle of Moscow (1985)
- Ashik Kerib (1988)
- Stone Soul (1988)
- The Mountains are Smoking (1989)
- Miracle in the Land of Oblivion (1991)
- Carpathian gold (1991)
- Cherry nights (1992)
- Judenkreis, or Eternal Wheel (1996)
- As a blacksmith was looking for happiness (1999)

== Accolades ==
- People's Artist of the USSR
- People's Artist of Ukraine
- Order of Merit (Second Class, 2003)
- Order of Merit (Third Class, 1998)
