= The Flight (1970 film) =

1970 film

- Film poster
- Directed by: Aleksandr Alov; Vladimir Naumov
- Written by: Mikhail A. Bulgakov (play); Aleksandr Alov; Vladimir Naumov
- Starring: Lyudmila Savelyeva; Aleksey Batalov; Mikhail Ulyanov; Tatyana Tkach
- Cinematography: Levan Paatashvili
- Edited by: Tamara Zubova
- Release date: 1970
- Running time: 196 minutes
- Country: Soviet Union
- Language: Russian

The Flight (Russian: Бег, transliteration Beg) is a 1970 Soviet historical drama film, mainly based on writer Mikhail Bulgakov's play Flight, but also on his novel The White Guard and his libretto Black Sea. It is written and directed by Aleksandr Alov and Vladimir Naumov and is the story about a group of Russian Empire's high society refugees from the Russian Civil War, seeking out an existence in Istanbul and Paris in the 1920s. It was entered into the 1971 Cannes Film Festival.

== Plot ==
In November 1920, as the Russian Civil War draws to a close in the South, the Red Army presses into Crimea, causing widespread panic among those who had once thrived before the 1917 Revolution. This massive upheaval sweeps away members of the former elite, who now find themselves forced to leave their homeland in a desperate exodus to escape the advancing Red Army. In this chaotic landscape, the lives of disparate characters intertwine: Serafima Korzukhina, the wife of a former trade minister; General Charnota, a courageous White Army officer who has lost nearly everything except his pride; his partner, Lyuska; the thoughtful intellectual Golubkov; and the tortured White General Khludov, who struggles to hold on to his sanity, haunted by visions of the men he ordered executed.

The group manages to escape to Constantinople, fleeing by train and ship. However, their new life in exile offers only poverty and hardship, a harsh fall from their former social standing. General Charnota, once a man of authority, now scrambles to survive in a foreign land, enduring the indignities of impoverished exile. Khludov becomes increasingly erratic, tormented by dreams of the atrocities he committed, the ghost of Krapilin haunting him wherever he goes.

In Constantinople, Serafima faces an unbearable decision—resorting to prostitution for survival. To save her from this fate, Golubkov and Charnota embark on a desperate journey to Paris, hoping to find Serafima’s estranged husband, Korzukhin, who still holds the financial resources that could secure her future. However, when they finally locate Korzukhin, he coldly denies Serafima and refuses to provide any support. In a daring twist, Charnota challenges him to a card game, ultimately winning a significant sum. With Lyuska's help, as she is now involved with Korzukhin, Golubkov and Charnota successfully escape Paris with the money.

Back in Constantinople, Golubkov and Serafima, now deeply connected by love and shared hardship, decide to return to Soviet Russia, despite the dangers and uncertainties that await them there. For them, the homeland they long for holds an idealized promise of belonging and redemption, no matter how distant it may be from the reality awaiting them.

Meanwhile, the White generals, who cannot return due to the threat of execution, are resigned to their lives in exile. Charnota, embodying a mix of tragic defiance and dark humor, resumes his gambling and begins to call himself the "Flying Dutchman" or "Ahasuerus," casting himself as a wanderer doomed to roam forever. Khludov, consumed by guilt and memories of the war, becomes increasingly lost in his visions.

The film culminates with a dream-like scene where Golubkov and Serafima ride through a snowy Russian forest.

== Cast ==
- Lyudmila Savelyeva as Serafima Vladimirovna Korzukhina
- Aleksey Batalov as Sergei Pavlovich Golubkov
- Mikhail Ulyanov as General Charnota
- Tatyana Tkach as Lyuska
- Vladislav Dvorzhetsky as General Khludov
- Yevgeniy Yevstigneyev as Korzukhin
- Vladimir Zamansky as Baev
- Nikolay Olyalin as Krapilin
- Bruno Freindlich as General Vrangel
- Vladimir Basov as Artur Arturovich, the Cockroach Tsar
- Tamara Loginova as Lichiko
- Oleg Yefremov as Colonel
- Vladimir Osenev as Tikhiy
- Gotlib Roninson as Voluptuous Greek
