= Natalya Belokhvostikova =

Soviet and Russian actress

- Born: Natalya Nikolayevna Belokhvostikova; July 28, 1951 (age 74); Moscow, Russian SFSR, Soviet Union
- Occupation: Actress
- Years active: 1969-1997

Natalya Nikolayevna Belokhvostikova (Russian: Ната́лья Никола́евна Белохво́стикова; born July 28, 1951, in Moscow, USSR) is a retired Soviet and Russian actress. She was awarded the title People's Artist of Russia in 1984.

== Biography ==
Natalia Belokhvostikova was born July 28, 1951, in Moscow in the family of a diplomat.

Belohvostikova's cinematic debut took place in 1965, when she appeared in a crowd scene in the Mark Donskoy film A Mother's Heart.

In 1968, she entered the VGIK into the acting studio of Sergei Gerasimov and Tamara Makarova. While still a student, she played in the film of her teacher Gerasimov By the Lake. For the role of Lena Barmina, Belokhvostikova was awarded the State Prize of the USSR (1971), becoming the youngest laureate.

After graduation from VGIK in 1971, Natalia became an actress of the Theater-Studio of the actor. In the same year she played the part of Anna Snegina in Sergey Urusevsky's Sing a Song, Poet. In 1976, Belokhvostikova starred in Gerasimov's film adaptation of Stendhal's novel The Red and the Black in the role of Matilda de la Mole, and in 1979 by Mikhail Schweitzer as Donna Anna in Little Tragedies.

Her best roles are related to the work of the directors Alexander Alov and Vladimir Naumov - Nele in The Legend of Thiele (1976), Natalie and Marie in Teheran 43 (1980), Emma in Beach (1984), Lena in Ten Years Without the Right of Correspondence (1990).

The role in the film Teheran 43 brought the actress all-union fame. For participation in the film Beach in 1985 she received the State Prize of the USSR.

In 1984, Natalia Belokhvostikova was awarded the title People's Artist of the RSFSR.

Belokhvostikova continues to work in film and television. Among her most recent works are the films Clock without Hands (2001), The Year of the Horse: the Scorpion Constellation (2004), The Gioconda on the Asphalt (2007), In Russia it's snowing (2010).

In 2006, the actress was awarded the Order of Merit for the Fatherland IV degree.

== Personal life ==
Natalia Belokhvostikova's husband is director Vladimir Naumov. They have a daughter, Natalia Naumova, who is an actress and director.

== Partial filmography ==
- By the Lake (У озера, 1970) as Lena Barmina
- Nadezhda (Надежда, 1973) as Nadezhda Krupskaya
- Sing a Song, Poet (Пой песню, поэт 1973) as Anna Snegina
- Ocean (1974) as Anechka
- The Legend of Till Ullenspiegel (Легенда о Тиле, 1976) as Nele
- The Red and the Black as Matilda de la Mole
- A Glass of Water (Стакан воды, 1979) as Anne, Queen of England
- Little Tragedies (Маленькие трагедии, 1979) as Donna Anna
- Nezvanyy drug (Незваный друг 1981)
- Tegeran-43 (Тегеран-43, 1981) as Marie Louni / Nathalie
- The Circus Princess (Принцесса цирка, 1982) as Countess Palinskaya
- Dve glavy iz semeynoy khroniki (1983)
- Beach (Берег 1984) as Emma Herbert
- Gorod nevest (1985)
- Zmeyelov (1985)
- Legal Marriage (Законный брак 1986)
- Choice (Выбор 1987) as Mariya / Veronika Vasilyeva
- The Law (Zakon 1989)
- Ten Years Without Right to Write Letters (Десять лет без права переписки, 1990) as Nina
- Istoriya s metranpazhem (1991)
- Gospodi, uslysh molitvu moyu (1991)
- Razyskivayetsya opasnyu prestupnik (1992)
- White Feast (Белый праздник 1994)
- Tayna Marchello (Тайна Марчелло 1997)
- V Rossii idet sneg (2010)
