= Boris Seidenberg =

Soviet actor and artist

- Born: May 21, 1929; Odesa, Soviet Union
- Died: October 20, 2000 (aged 71); Odesa, Ukraine
- Occupations: actor, producer, director
- Years active: 1950-2000

Boris Ilyich Seidenberg (Russian: Бори́с Ильи́ч За́йденберг; 21 May 1929, Odesa, Soviet Union - 20 October 2000, Odesa, Ukraine) was a Soviet actor and a Meritorious Artist of the Russian Socialist Federal Soviet Republic.

== Biography ==
Seidenberg was interested in acting from an early age. Despite his family's objections, he went to study at the Aleksander Ostrovsky Theater and Art Academy in Tashkent. Though located in the remote Uzbek SSR, the academy's staff consisted of some of the Soviet Union's best dramatists, who moved in there from Moscow and Leningrad after being blacklisted as rootless cosmopolitans during Andrei Zhdanov's artistic purges.

After graduating at 1950, Seidenberg joined the cast of the Alexander Pushkin Dramatical Theater in Magnitogorsk. After three years there, he began acting in the Bryansk Regional Theater. His work on the stage earned him the title Meritorious Artist of the Russian SFSR on 1961. Seidenberg moved to the Odesa Russian Theater at 1962, where he performed a wide range of characters; his appearances as Mercutio in Romeo and Juliet were especially praised by critics. He also depicted Cyrano de Bergerac, King Lear, Hamlet and many other Shakespearean protagonists.

At 1964, Seidenberg directed his first play, an adaptation of Kennen Sie die Milchstraße? by Karl Wittlinger. He later directed more than thirty stage productions, mainly in the Russian Theater but also in the Vasilko Musical-Dramatical Theater in Odesa. He also held the tenure of an associate professor in the municipal Antonina Nezhdanova Conservatory's opera department. Seidenberg continued directing and producing plays until his death.

He made his debut on screen as cavalryman Emelyanov in the 1965 film Viper, based on the 1928 eponymous novel by Aleksey Nikolayevich Tolstoy. The film was received positively and viewed by 34 million people, making it the seventh highest-grossing Soviet film of the year. Seidenberg appeared in more than forty films altogether.

== Partial filmography ==
- 1965: The Viper - Dmitriy Yemelyanov
- 1967: Poisk - Nikolay Kuzmich Chebotar
- 1967: The Search
- 1967: Wedding bells
- 1968: Tikhaya Odessa - Komendant
- 1968: Sluchay iz sledstvennoy praktiki - Commander
- 1969: I'm His Betrothed - Innokentiy Nekrasov
- 1970: Liberation I: The Fire Bulge - Major Orlov
- 1970: Liberation II: Breakthrough - Major Orlov
- 1970: Krutoy gorizont - Kostenko
- 1971: Liberation III: Direction of the Main Blow - Orlov
- 1971: Criminal Inspector - Yevgeniy Mironov - sledovatel prokuratory
- 1972: Insolence - Vosaglik Yozef
- 1972: Ofitser zapasa - Buzhor
- 1972: Petka v kosmose
- 1972: Lyogkaya voda - Ramazanov
- 1973: The Washington Correspondent (TV Movie) - Jeff Bradford
- 1973: More nashey nadezhdy - Stepan Pavlyuk
- 1973: Budni ugolovnogo rozyska - Yevgeniy Mironov - podpolkovnik
- 1973: The Great Battle - Major Orlov
- 1973: Zarubki na pamyat - Nikolay Zherdan
- 1974: Skvorets i Lira - Kringli
- 1974: Countermeasure - Garak
- 1975: Suse, liebe Suse - Boris
- 1975: Black Caravan - Garak
- 1975: Sleduyu svoim kursom - Sergey Mikhaylovich Eltsov (narrator)
- 1975: Chto s toboy proiskhodit - Lew Ivanovits
- 1975: Chyornyy karavan
- 1977: Svidetelstvo o bednosti - Direktor chasovogo zavoda (narrator, uncredited)
- 1979: Krepost - Zhuravlyov
- 1979: Vsyo reshayet mgnoveniye - Aleksandr Palinov, glavnyy trener sbornoy
- 1980: Deputatskiy chas
- 1981: Cherez Gobi i Khingan - General-leytenant
- 1981: The Adventures of Tom Sawyer and Huckleberry Finn (TV Movie)
- 1983: Through the Gobi Desert and Xing'an
- 1985: Sopernitsy - Vasiliy Lashin
- 1985: The Temptation of Don Giovanni - Starejshina
- 1986: Train Off Schedule - Nachalnik zheleznoy dorogi
- 1986: Opponents
- 1987: Okhota na drakona
- 1987: Vash spetsialnyi korrespondent - Mihai Spinu
- 1991: Pokhorony na vtorom etazhe - Zaborin
- 1993: Ya sama - Prokuror
- 1998: Poyezd do Bruklina - Budko (final film role)
