= My Good Dad =

- Russian: Мой добрый папа
- Directed by: Igor Usov
- Written by: Viktor Golyavkin; Igor Usov
- Starring: Aleksandr Demyanenko; Lyudmila Gurchenko; Sasha Arutyunov; Eldar Azimov; Rafiq Azimov; Nikolay Boyarskiy; Masha Bryanskaya; Aliagha Aghayev
- Cinematography: Aleksandr Dibrivnyy
- Edited by: Lyudmila Butuzova
- Music by: Andrei Petrov
- Production company: Lenfilm
- Release date: 1970
- Running time: 66 minutes
- Country: Soviet Union
- Language: Russian

My Good Dad (Russian: Мой добрый папа) is a 1970 Soviet drama film directed by Igor Usov.

== Plot ==
The film tells about a seven-year-old boy, Petya, who enjoys a happy life in Baku. But suddenly the war broke out and his father is sent to the front. Before leaving, he told Petya that he should always be kind and sympathetic. Petya's father dies in the war, but his father's words become his principles.

== Cast ==
- Kostya Kornakov as Petya Ivanov
- Aleksandr Demyanenko as Dad
- Lyudmila Gurchenko as Mom
- Sasha Arutyunov as Boba
- Nikolay Boyarskiy as Uncle Gosha
- Eldar Azimov
- Rafiq Azimov
- Masha Bryanskaya
- Aliagha Aghayev
- Tarlan Farzaliyev
- Gamal Gvardeyev
