= Nikolay Olyalin =

Soviet-Ukrainian actor of Russian ethnicity

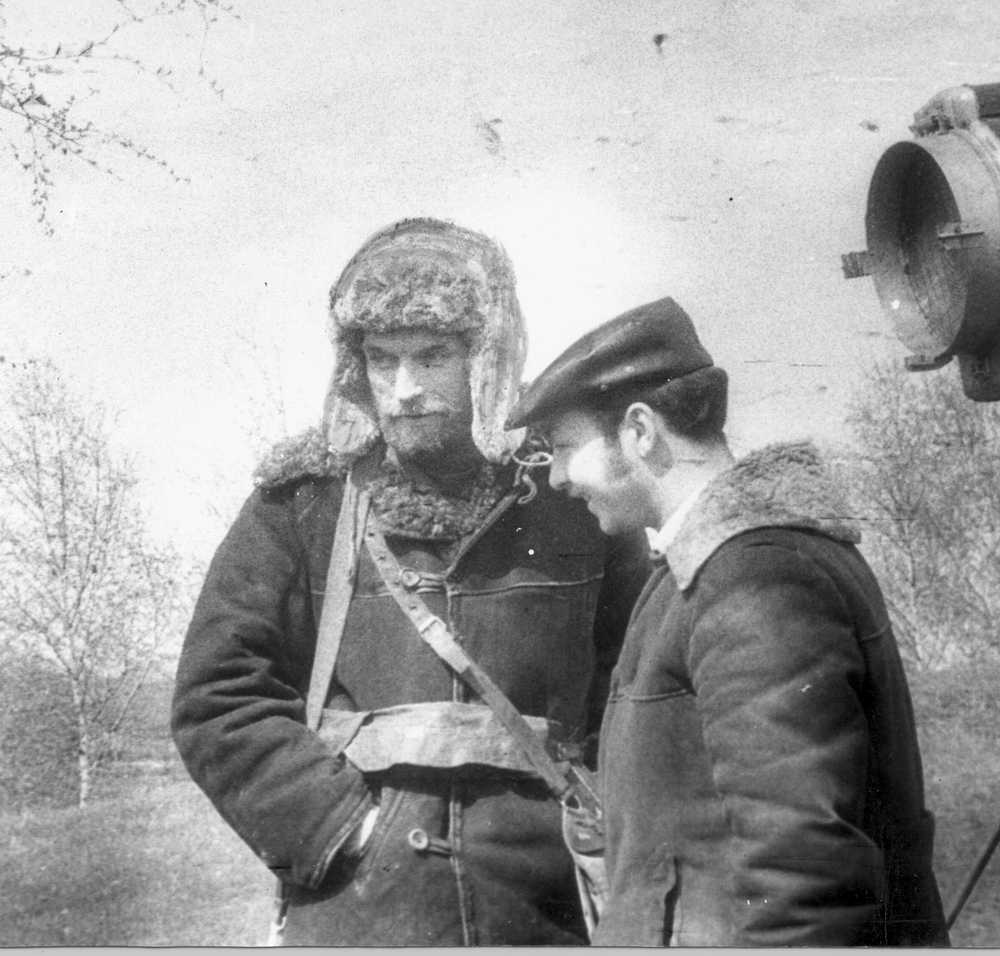
- Nikolay Olyalin (left) in 1974
- Born: Nikolay Vladimiriovich Olyalin; 22 May 1941; Opikhalino, Vologodsky District, Vologda Oblast, Russian SFSR
- Died: 17 November 2009 (aged 68); Kyiv, Ukraine
- Occupations: Actor, director
- Years active: 1954-2009
- Spouse: Nella Olyalina

Nikolay Vladimiriovich Olyalin (Russian: Николай Владимирович Олялин; 22 May 1941 — 17 November 2009) was a Soviet-Ukrainian actor of Russian ethnicity.

== Biography ==
=== Early life ===
As a child, Olyalin took drama classes at school. In 1959, when his father sent him to a military academy in Leningrad, hoping that he would become an army topographer, Olyalin chose to study in the Leningrad State Institute of Theater, Music and Cinematography instead. After graduating at 1964, he joined the Krasnoyarsk Children's Theater, where - in spite of having tense relations with the director - he was considered the best comical actor among the cast. There, he met his wife, Nella, who was the second secretary of the local Komsomol.

Olyalin made his debut on screen depicting a test pilot in the 1965 film Days of Flight. Afterwards, he received many invitations to play in other motion pictures, but the Theater manager never told him of those and threw them away. When a letter from the Mosfilm studio reached Krasnoyarsk, offering Olyalin the main role in Yuri Ozerov's Liberation, one of the couriers told him of the matter. He claimed to be sick, took a leave and boarded a flight to Moscow. The character of Captain Tzvetaev, which he portrayed in the five parts of Liberation, gained him fame throughout the Soviet Union.

=== Height of career ===
At 1968, during the filming of Ozerov's series, Olyalin met director Vasili Tzvirkunov from the Dovzhenko Film Studios and accepted his proposal to work with the company. He starred in several films during the early 1970s, among which was the popular Gentlemen of Fortune, and received the Ukrainian SSR Komsomol's Nikolai Ostrovsky Prize in 1972. Overall, he appeared in some sixty cinema and television productions until his departure.

Olyalin's career was compromised when he sunk into severe alcoholism, and banned from acting for a while. The secretary of the Communist Party in Ukraine, Volodymyr Shcherbytsky, a personal friend of Olyalin, arranged for him to be taken into rehabilitation. Olyalin told an interviewer that since then he "didn't drink a drop". After resuming his work, he was granted the title People's Artist of Ukraine at 1979.

=== Later years ===
After the collapse of the Soviet Union, Olyalin stayed in the newly independent Ukraine. At 1992, he directed his own film, Volya. He has been a member of the Ukrainian Association of Cinematographers and awarded the Order of Prince Yaroslav the Wise, fifth class, by the Ukrainian government. He continued to perform in his later years, playing the Inquisitor in Night Watch (2004) and Day Watch (2006).

Olyalin suffered from a heart condition, apparently caused by being exposed to radiation during the Chernobyl disaster. He died of a heart attack at 2009 and was laid to rest in the Baikove Cemetery.

== Partial filmography ==
- Liberation (1970-1971, part 1-5) as Tsvetaev
- The Flight (1971) as Krapilin
- Stopwatch (1971) as Sergey Lavrov
- Gentlemen of Fortune (1971) as Colonel Verchenko
- World Guy (1971) as Viktor Loginov
- The Great Battle (1973) as Tsvetayev
- The Legend of Princess Olga (1984) as Oleg the Seer
- Day Watch (2004) as Inquisitor
- Yesenin (2005, TV Mini-Series) as Grigory Samohin
- Night Watch (2006) as Inquisitor
- Bimmer 2 (2006) as grandfather Ilya
- Attack on Leningrad (2009) as Grevitskiy (final film role)
