= Karmelyuk =

Karmelyuk or Karmaliuk may refer to:

- Ustym Karmaliuk (1787–1835), a Ukrainian folk hero
- Yuriy Karmelyuk (born 1971), Ukrainian footballer and manager
- Karmelyuk (1931 film), a 1931 Ukrainian film directed by Faust Lopatinksy
- Karmelyuk (1938 film), a 1938 Ukrainian film with Natalia Uzhviy
- Karmelyuk, a 1985 Ukrainian film with Romualdas Ramanauskas
- Karmaliuk, an unfinished opera by Kyrylo Stetsenko
- Karmaliuk, a 2006 album by Ukrainian band Teoriia Gvaltu
