= Hail, Mary! =

1970 film by Iosif Kheifits

- Film poster
- Directed by: Iosif Kheifits
- Starring: Ada Rogovtseva
- Release date: 14 April 1970
- Country: Soviet Union
- Language: Russian

Hail, Mary! (Russian: Салют, Мария!, romanized: Salyut, Maria!) is a 1970 Soviet drama film directed by Iosif Kheifits. It was entered into the 7th Moscow International Film Festival where Ada Rogovtseva won the award for Best Actress. The film is based on the life of Maria Fortus.

== Plot ==
The film is set in 1919. In the vastness of the former Russian Empire a civil war rages on. In Europe, the World War has just ended and the winning countries are to organize a military intervention in Russia to help the White movement in the struggle against Soviet power.

In one of the southern ports come on board ships of the Entente troops, including those from Spain. The young underground fighter Maria gets the job to campaign among the Spanish sailors and soldiers. This is where she meets Pablo, a sailor. They begin to fall in love.

The Civil War is over. In Russia, Soviet power had taken hold. The characters dream of a world-wide revolution. After a long separation, Maria and Pablo meet again and together go to Spain as Comintern agents, to prepare a local revolution and at the same time to conduct intelligence activities there. They end up having a son.

But the happiness does not last long - the Nazis kill Pablo. In Spain, civil war erupts. Maria's son, a fighter pilot, dies in a dogfight. Having lost her husband and son, Maria returns home, where she works as an instructor in a Soviet intelligence school.

== Cast ==
- Ada Rogovtseva as Maria Tkachyova
- Angel Gutierrez as Pablo Luis Alvarez
- Vitali Solomin as Seva Chudreev
- Vladimir Tatosov as Ignacio Mures
- Valentina Vladimirova as Maria's mother
- Alexander Barinov as Pavlik, Paulito, son of Maria and Pablo, Soviet pilot-internationalist
- Tatiana Bedova as Olya / Nadezhda Kosheverova, agent
- Avgust Baltrusaitis
- L. Bayon
- Oleg Belov as Riccardo Rivas
