= Andrei Korchagin =

Russian-Belarusian footballer

Personal information
- Full name: Andrei Sergeyevich Korchagin
- Date of birth: 11 January 1980 (age 46)
- Place of birth: Saratov, Russian SFSR
- Height: 1.78 m (5 ft 10 in)
- Position: Midfielder

Youth career
- 1995–1997: Anderlecht

Senior career*
Years	Team	Apps	(Gls)
1997–2001	Sportakademklub Moscow	142	(34)
2002	Metallurg Krasnoyarsk	30	(1)
2003	Dinaburg Daugavpils	6	(1)
2003	Kristall Smolensk	12	(1)
2004	Darida Minsk Raion	11	(0)
2005	Energetik Uren	16	(0)
2005–2007	Magnit Zheleznogorsk	64	(34)
2008	Gornyak Uchaly	29	(1)
2009	Bashinformsvyaz-Dynamo Ufa	30	(3)
2010	Magnit Zheleznogorsk	19	(9)
- * Club domestic league appearances and goals

Andrei Sergeyevich Korchagin (Russian: Андрей Серге́евич Корчагин; born 11 January 1980) is a former Russian professional footballer. He also holds Belarusian citizenship.
