= Born of the Storm =

Unfinished novel by Nikolai Ostrovsky

- Author: Nikolai Ostrovsky
- Original title: Рождённые бурей
- Language: Russian
- Genre: Socialist realism
- Publication place: Soviet Union

Born of the Storm is a socialist realist novel written by Nikolai Ostrovsky (1904–1936) during Joseph Stalin's era. The novel, begun in January 1924 and concerning the Ukrainian–Soviet War, remains unfinished due to Ostrovsky's death in December 1936.

== Plot summary ==
The action of Born of the Storm goes on in autumnal days of 1918 when Poland was regaining its independence after 123 years of partitions. German occupational forces moved away from Ukrainian territories while local Polish legioners had been formed with dreams of adding some Ukrainian, Belarusian and Lithuanian lands to the Polish state bordering on the ruins of Russian, German and Austro-Hungarian empires.
