= Ludmila Savelyeva =

Soviet and Russian actress

- Людмила Савельева
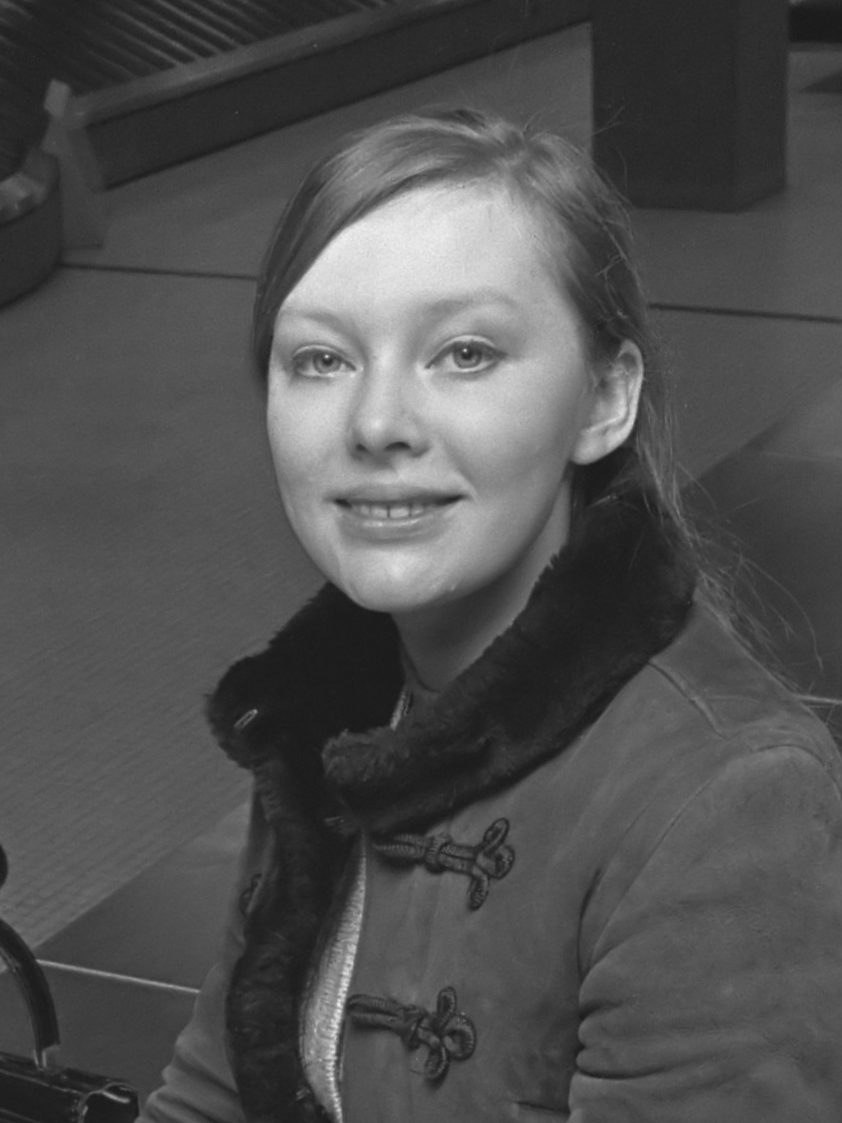
- Savelyeva in 1972
- Born: January 24, 1942 (age 84); Leningrad, Russian SFSR, Soviet Union
- Occupation: Actress
- Years active: 1962–present

Ludmila Mikhailovna Savelyeva (Russian: Людмила Михайловна Савельева; born January 24, 1942) is a Soviet and Russian stage and film actress. She achieved lasting fame in the role of Natasha Rostova in the 1966–67 film War and Peace, which won an Academy Award for Best Foreign Language Film. She won a Diploma prize for the role at the 4th Moscow International Film Festival.

== Filmography ==
- War and Peace (1966–1967) as Natasha Rostova
- Sunflower (1970) as Maria
- The Flight (1970) as Serafima Vladimirovna Korzukhina
- The Seagull (1970) as Nina Mikhailovna Zarechnaya
- The Headless Horseman (1973) as Louise Poindexter
- Yuliya Vrevskaya (1978) as Yuliya Vrevskaya
- The Fourth Year of War (1983) as captain Nadezhda Moroz
- Success (1984) as Inna, Fetisov's ex-wife
- Wild Pigeon (1986) as Kseniya Nikolayevna Startseva, actress
- Black Rose Is an Emblem of Sorrow, Red Rose Is an Emblem of Love (1989) as Aleksandra's mother
- Tender Age (2000) as Ivan Gromov's grandmother, former pilot, "Night Witch"
