= Sergei Korchagin =

Russian footballer

Personal information
- Full name: Sergei Viktorovich Korchagin
- Date of birth: 28 July 1975 (age 51)
- Place of birth: Kyubyshev, Russian SFSR
- Height: 1.75 m (5 ft 9 in)
- Position: Midfielder

Senior career*
Years	Team	Apps	(Gls)
1995–1998	FC Krylia Sovetov Samara	18	(0)
1997	→ FC Neftyanik Pokhvistnevo (loan)	18	(5)
2000–2001	FC Balakovo	37	(3)
2004	FC Lokomotiv Samara		
2005	FC Yunit Samara (amateur)		
- * Club domestic league appearances and goals

Sergei Viktorovich Korchagin (Russian: Сергей Викторович Корчагин; born 28 July 1975 in Kuybyshev) is a former Russian football player.
