= Stopwatch (film) =

- Russian: Секундомер
- Directed by: Rezo Esadze
- Written by: Leonid Zorin
- Starring: Nikolay Olyalin; Natalya Antonova; Viktoriya Beskova; Liliya Aleshnikova; Irina Kuberskaya; Olga Gasparova
- Cinematography: Valeri Fedosov
- Edited by: L. Zaytseva
- Music by: Oleg Karavaychuk
- Release date: 1970
- Country: Soviet Union
- Language: Russian

Stopwatch (Russian: Секундомер) is a 1970 Soviet sports drama film directed by Rezo Esadze.

== Plot ==
The film tells about the famous football player Lavrov, who decides to leave the sport. He spends his last match in an unfamiliar city and meets there a woman with whom he was in love.

== Cast ==
- Nikolay Olyalin as Sergey Lavrov
- Natalya Antonova as Natalya
- Viktoriya Beskova as Vera
- Liliya Aleshnikova as Tamara (as L. Aleshnikova)
- Irina Kuberskaya as Asya (as I. Kuberskaya)
- Olga Gasparova as Nina (as O. Kobelyeva)
- Oleg Khromenkov as Vasya (as O. Khromenkov)
- Sergey Muchenikov as Misha (as S. Muchenikov)
- Edward Tyshler
- Yuri Khmelnitsky
