= Malvina Shvidler =

Soviet and Ukrainian actress

Malvina Shvidler

Malvina Zinoviivna Shvidler (Ukrainian: Мальвіна Зіновіївна Швідлер) (19 August 1919, Odesa – 15 July 2011, Kyiv) was a Soviet and Ukrainian theater and film actress, Honored Artist of the Ukrainian SSR (1972), People's Artist of Ukraine (1996). Winner of the Kyiv Pectoral Award for outstanding contribution to theatrical art (1999). Member of the National Union of Theater Actors of Ukraine.

== Early life and education ==
Malvina Shvidler was born on August 19, 1919, in Odesa. Her father operated a brickmaking factory. In 1934, after graduating from a labor school, she took part in the competition for the preparatory course for the Russian department of the Odessa Theater School. In 1939, Shvidler graduated from Odesa Theater School and played in Odesa Theater of Miniatures. The same year she married the director of the Lviv variety art Boris Zhelkov.

== Career ==
From 1939 to 1941 she was an actress of the Lviv Philharmonic Society.

During the World War II, in 1941–1944, Shvidler served in the Tashkent Academic Russian Drama Theater named after Maxim Gorky. Since 1945 she was an actress at the Lesya Ukrainka National Academic Theater of Russian Drama.

Shvidler played roles in more than 80 theater performances and 13 films. Among her works in cinema are such films as: Trap, Your Name, Mistress, Where are you knights?, Adventures with a Tarapunka jacket, Tatarka.

In 1972, Shvidler was awarded a title of an Honored Artist of the Ukrainian SSR, and in 1996, the title of People's Artist of Ukraine. In 1999, she became a winner of the Kyiv Pectoral Award for outstanding contribution to theatrical art. Shvidler was a member of the National Union of Theater Actors of Ukraine.

In 2002, Shvidler appeared in her last stage performance of the Lesya Ukrainka National Academic Theater of Russian Drama.

Malvina Shvidler died on 15 July 2011 in Kyiv in the age of 92. She was buried in Kyiv at the Baikove cemetery.

In 2013, the memoirs of Malvina Shvidler Life is like a children's shirt ... compiled by Lyubov Zhuravleva were published.

== Awards ==
- Honored Artist of the Ukrainian SSR (1972)
- People's Artist of Ukraine (1996)
- Kyiv Pectoral Award (1999)

== Filmography ==
- 1948 – The third blow
- 1955 – Adventures with a Tarapunka jacket (short film)
- 1965 – The Viper
- 1966 – Alone with the night
- 1970 – The Way to the Heart
- 1971 – Where are you knights?
- 1978 – Mistress
- 1989 – Your name
- 1993 – Trap
