= Ada Rohovtseva =

Ukrainian actress (born 1937)

Hero of Ukraine People's Artist Ada Rohovtseva
- Ада Роговцева
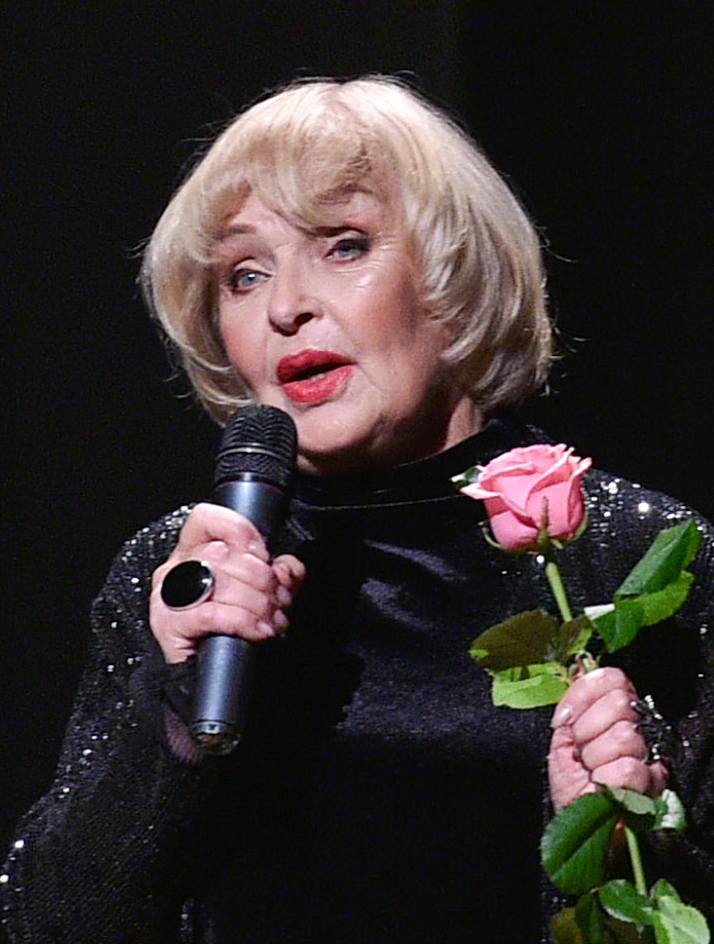
- Rohovtseva in 2017
- Born: Ada Mykolaivna Rohovtseva; 16 July 1937 (age 89); Hlukhiv, Ukrainian SSR, Soviet Union
- Education: Kyiv National I. K. Karpenko-Kary Theatre, Cinema and Television University
- Occupations: Actress, theater pedagogue
- Years active: 1956–present
- Spouse: Kostiantyn Stepankov
- Awards: Shevchenko National Prize (1981); Hero of Ukraine (2007); Oleksandr Dovzhenko State Prize (2017)

Ada Mykolaivna Rohovtseva (Ukrainian: Ада Миколаївна Роговцева; born 16 July 1937) is a Ukrainian and former Soviet stage and film actress. She has appeared in over 30 films and television shows since 1957. Professor at the National University of Culture. She won the award for Best Actress at the 7th Moscow International Film Festival for her role in Hail, Mary!.

People's Artist of the USSR (1978) and Hero of Ukraine (2007).

== Biography ==
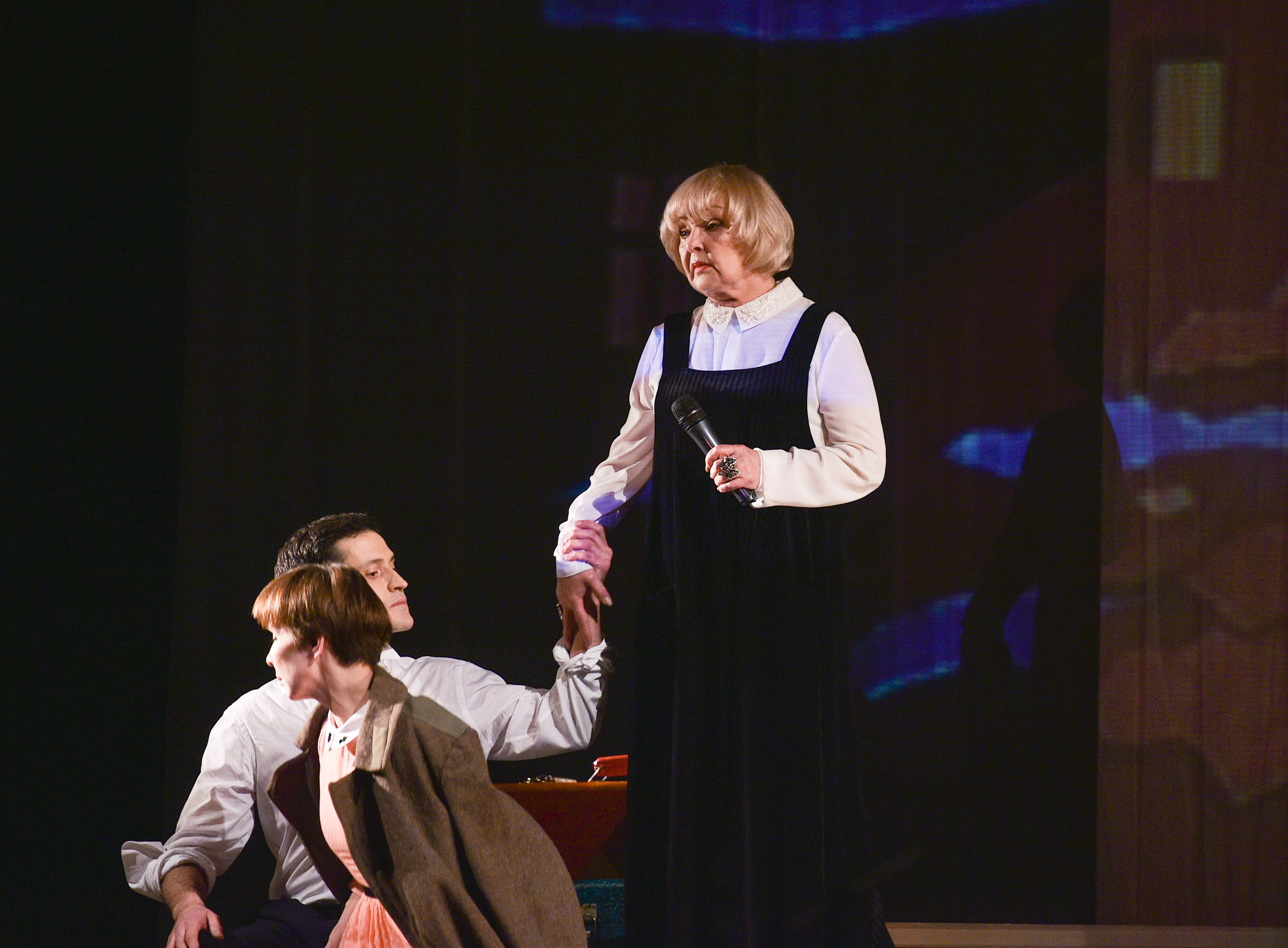
Rohovtseva on stage in 2017

Rohovtseva was born in Hlukhiv. Her father, Mykola Ivanovych Rohovtsev, had two higher educations, graduated from the industrial and agricultural institutions, and worked in the NKVD during the war. Mother, Hanna Mytrofanivna Zaikovska, was an agronom.

She is a member of the Committee on the National Prize of Ukraine named after Taras Shevchenko since 1992.

She participated in the Orange Revolution in 2004, and strongly condemned both the Russian annexation of Crimea in 2014 and the invasion of Ukraine in 2022.

== Filmography ==
- Pavel Korchagin (1956) as Christina
- Forest Song (1961) as Meadow Rusalka
- Hail, Mary! (1970) as Maria Tkachyova
- Taming of the Fire (1972) as Natalya Bashkirtseva
- Eternal Call (1973-1983) as Anna Kaftanova
- The Gadfly (1980) as Julie Burton
- Nine Lives of Nestor Makhno (2006) as Yevdokiya Matviyivna Makhno, Nestor Makhno's mother
- Caucasia (2007) as Maria
- Admiral (2008) as elderly Anna Timiryova
- Taras Bulba (2009) as Taras Bulba's wife
- Brothel Lights (2011) as Yefrosinya Petrovna, Lyuba's mother
- Viddana (2020) as Princess
- Early Swallows (2020) as Nadia Ivanivna Kozhukh

== Awards and honors ==
- Honored Artist of the Ukrainian SSR (1960)
- People's Artist of the Ukrainian SSR (1967)
- Jubilee Medal "In Commemoration of the 100th Anniversary of the Birth of Vladimir Ilyich Lenin" (1970)
- People's Artist of the USSR (1978)
- Shevchenko National Prize (1981)
- Medal "In Commemoration of the 1500th Anniversary of Kiev" (1982)
- Order of Merit, 3rd class (1997)
- Order of Princess Olga, 3rd class (2002)
- Hero of Ukraine (2007)
- Order of Friendship (2007)
- Order of Merit, 1st class (2009)
- Jubilee Medal "25 Years of Independence of Ukraine" (2016)
- Oleksandr Dovzhenko State Prize (2017)
- Order of the Badge of Honour
- Order of the Red Banner of Labour
