= Vladimir Naumov =

Soviet film director (1927–2021)

- Владимир Наумов
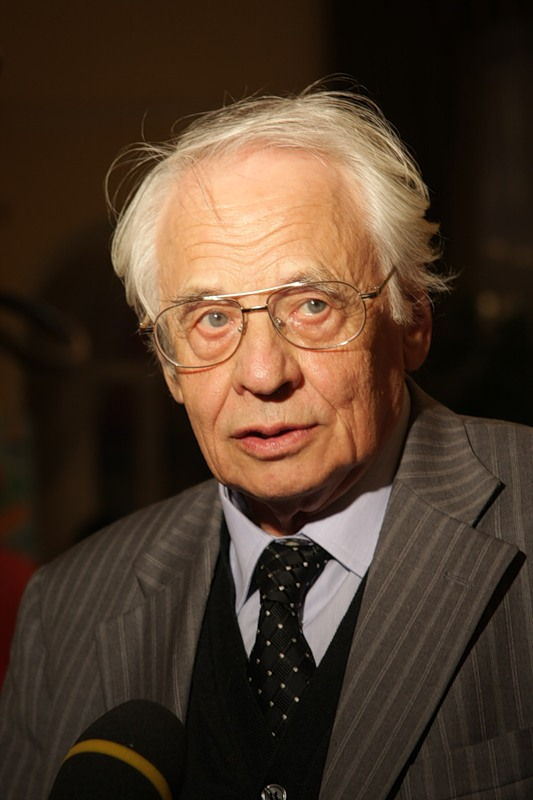
- Naumov in 2009
- Born: Vladimir Naumovich Naumov; 6 December 1927; Leningrad, Russian SFSR, Soviet Union
- Died: 29 November 2021 (aged 93); Moscow, Russia
- Occupations: Film director, screenwriter, actor, producer, pedagogue
- Notable work: Teheran 43 (1981)
- Title: People's Artist of the USSR (1982)
- Spouse: Natalya Belokhvostikova

Vladimir Naumovich Naumov (Russian: Влади́мир Нау́мович Нау́мов; 6 December 1927 – 29 November 2021) was a Soviet and Russian film director, screenwriter, actor, producer and pedagogue. He was the People's Artist of the USSR (1983).

He was a schoolmate of Sergei Parajanov at the Soviet film school. In 1977 he was a member of the jury at the 10th Moscow International Film Festival. His 1981 film Teheran 43 won the Golden Prize at the 12th Moscow International Film Festival.

== Life and career ==
Naumov, son of cinematographer Naum Naumov-Strazh, studied with Igor Savchenko at the VGIK in 1947–1951 and worked as one of his assistants on the biopic Taras Shevchenko (1951), which he completed with fellow student Aleksandr Alov after Savchenko's sudden death. Following the success of that debut, Alov and Naumov began to make films at the Kyiv film studio as a team under the label "Alov and Naumov".

After 1983 when Alov died, Naumov directed several pictures on his own. His first independent picture was The Choice (1987). In 1989, Naumov completed The Law based on a script that had been prohibited more than 20 years earlier. That film and Ten Years without Permission to Correspond (1990) deal with the country's Stalinist past. The script for the 1994 drama White Feast, starring Innokenty Smoktunovsky in his last role, was a collaboration between Naumov and prominent Italian screenwriter Tonino Guerra. Another project with Guerra, Nardo's Secret (1997/99), was troubled by never-ending financial difficulties and passed several stages before finally being released in 2001 as Clock without Hands. Like Naumov's other films of the 1990s, it suffered severely from Russia's cinema industry crisis and was seen by few people.

Naumov had been teaching at VGIK since 1980 and in 1986 he was promoted to the rank of full professor. In 2000, he began to teach at the private Natalya Nesterova University in Moscow.

Vladimir Naumov died on 29 November 2021, at the age of 93.

== Filmography ==
Note: all films before 1987 are co-directed with Aleksandr Alov

- Taras Shevchenko (1951)
- Restless Youth (1954)
- Pavel Korchagin (Павел Корчагин) (1957)
- The Wind (1959)
- Peace to Him Who Enters (1961)
- The Coin (1965)
- The Ugly Story (1966)
- The Flight (1970)
- Legend About Thiel (1976)
- Teheran 43 (1981)
- The Shore (1984)
- The Choice (1987)
- The Law (1989)
- Ten Years Without Right to Write Letters (1990)
- White Feast (1994)
- Nardo's Secret (1999)
- Clock without Hands (2001)
- La Gioconda on Asphalt (2007)
