= How the Steel Was Tempered =

Best selling Soviet novel by Nikolai Ostrovsky

- Russian cover
- Author: Nikolai Ostrovsky
- Original title: Как закалялась сталь
- Language: Russian
- Genre: Socialist realism
- Publisher: Young Guard (serial)
- Publication date: 1932–1934 (serial) – 1936 (book)
- Publication place: Soviet Union
- Media type: Print (hardback & paperback)

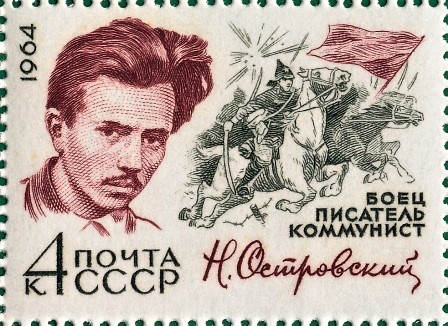
1964 stamp depicting Ostrovsky and an illustration for How the Steel Was Tempered

How the Steel Was Tempered (Russian: Как закалялась сталь, romanized: Kak zakalyalas stal) or The Making of a Hero, is a socialist realist novel written by Nikolai Ostrovsky (1904–1936). With 36.4 million copies sold, it is one of the best-selling books of all time and the best-selling book in the Russian language.

== Summary ==
The story follows the life of Pavel Korchagin, including his fighting in and aftermath of the Russian Civil War when he fought for the Bolsheviks during the war and was injured. The novel examines how Korchagin heals from his wounds and thus becomes as strong as steel.

The novel begins when Korchagin is 12, living in the town of Shepetovka in Ukraine. He gets kicked out of school for putting tobacco in some bread dough and must go to work as a dishwasher. As a dishwasher he is beaten by a coworker, but his brother Artyom defends him. The novel jumps forward to age 16 when he is working in a power plant. He meets a Bolshevik named Zhukhrai after a run-in with the Tsarist secret police. Zhukrai tells him about the Bolsheviks and Lenin. He also meets Tonia Toumanova, his first of many love interests. Again the novel jumps, to 1917 as the German army invades Shepetovka. Korchagin witnesses the town change hands several times in the chaos of the following months, with a pogrom against the town's Jewish population occurring during its occupation by soldiers loyal to Symon Petliura. Korchagin eventually joins the Bolsheviks and fights in the Civil War and Polish-Soviet War. He receives an injury in his spine, which slowly saps his strength for the remainder of the novel. After the war he works as a railway mechanic and advances as a Komsomol member in Kiev. He develops many social connections there but loses touch with many of his friends after he is presumed dead during work to build an emergency railway line to provide Shepetovka with firewood. As his health worsens due to his life of hardship and wartime injuries, he spends time in Sanatoria on the Black Sea coast, where he eventually meets and marries the young daughter of a friend of his mother's. Eventually, having lost his eyesight and almost totally paralyzed, Pavel moves to Moscow to consult medical specialists, but his condition is hopeless and he ends up staying there to write a novel about his cavalry division from the Civil War.

== Analysis ==
The story is a fictionalized autobiography of its author, Nikolai Ostrovsky. In real life, Ostrovsky's father died, and his mother worked as a cook. As he joined the war with the Red Army, he lost his right eye from artillery fire during the war.

In 2016, Russia's newspaper Russia Beyond The Headlines analyzed the story as part of the Soviet narrative of Communism forging uncivilized men into ideal men, like iron into steel. The protagonist fits the mold of pre-Khrushchev literature: an immaculate, ideally communistic individual.

== Characters ==
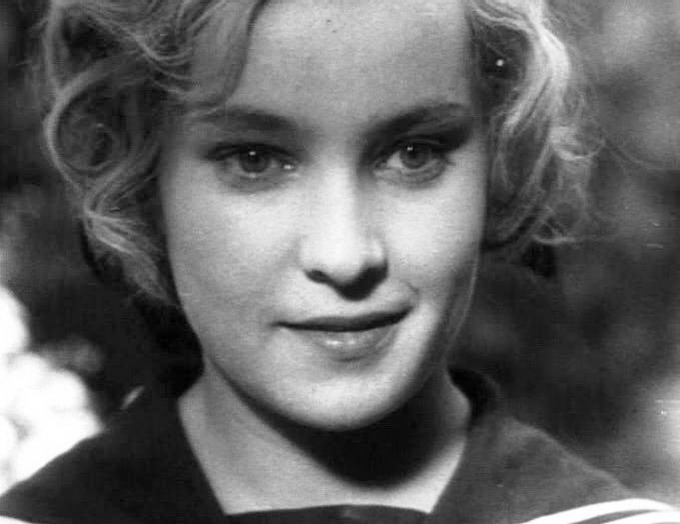
Irina Fedotova as Tonia in the 1942 film

- Pavel Korchagin – The novel's protagonist. He is fighting on the Bolsheviks' side in the Civil War (1917–1922). He is a quintessential positive hero of socialist realism.
- Tonia Toumanova – Pavel's teenage love. Tonia and Pavel became good friends after their first encounter, which later develops into an intimate relationship. Though born of a wealthy and influential family, Tonia treated everyone equally unlike her friends, who only interact with other children of well-reputed families. However, this changed as she grew up, as she became more aware of her appearance and social status of others.

== Publication history ==
The first part of How the Steel was Tempered was published serially in 1932 in the magazine Young Guard. The second part of the novel appeared in the same magazine from January to May, 1934. The novel was published in 1936 in book form in a heavily edited version that conformed to the rules of socialist realism. In the serial version Ostrovsky had described the tense atmosphere of Pavel's home, his suffering when he became an invalid, the deterioration of his relationship with his wife, and their separation. All of this disappeared in the 1936 publication and in later editions of the novel.

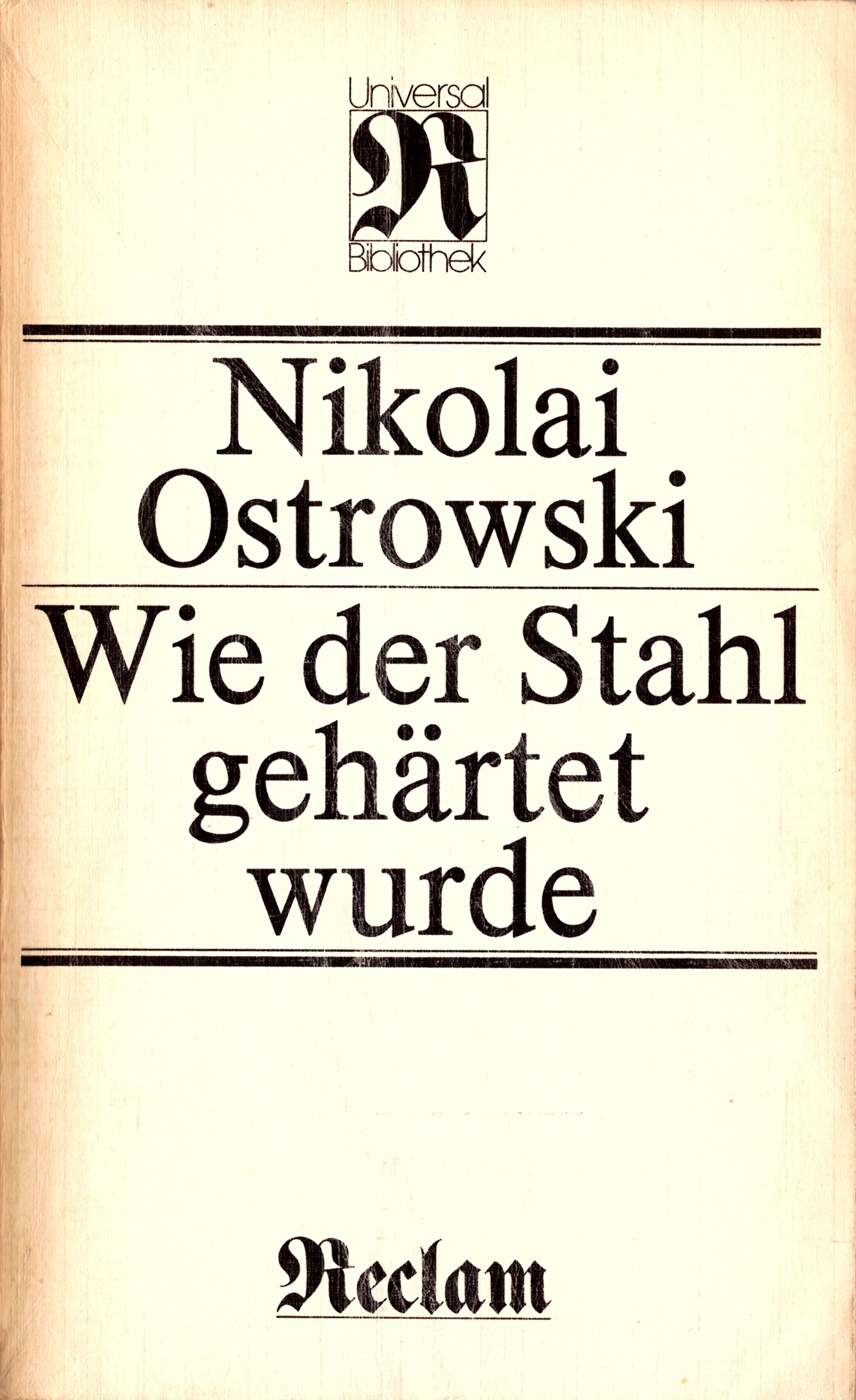
German translation by Nelly Drechsler

A Japanese translation of the novel was made by Ryokichi Sugimoto.

== Adaptations ==
In the Soviet Union, three films were produced based on this novel:

- How the Steel Was Tempered (1942)
- Pavel Korchagin (1956, Korchagin was played by Vasily Lanovoy)
- How the Steel Was Tempered, 1973 (TV series of 6 episodes; Korchagin was played by Vladimir Konkin)

In China, the novel was adapted into a television series of the same title in 2000; all the members of the cast were from Ukraine.

== In other media ==
- The third studio album of Russian experimental group Shortparis is titled Tak zakalyalas stal (Russian: Так закалялась сталь, lit. 'Thus the Steel Was Tempered') (2019).
