= Nikolai Ostrovsky =

Soviet-Ukrainian writer (1904–1936)

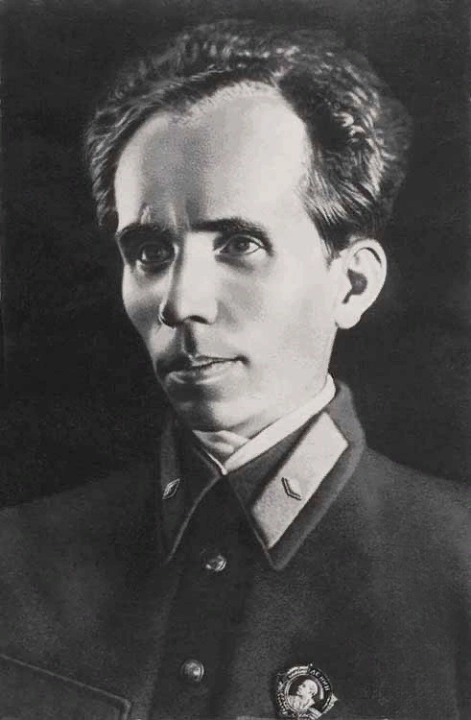
- Born: 29 September 1904; Viliia, Volhynian Governorate, Russian Empire
- Died: 22 December 1936 (aged 32); Moscow, Russian SFSR, Soviet Union
- Resting place: Novodevichy Cemetery, Moscow
- Education: Sverdlov Communist University
- Occupations: Novelist, Chekist, Communist Party member
- Spouse: Raisa Porfyrivna (née Motsyuk)
- Writing career
- Language: Russian
- Genre: Socialist realism
- Notable work: How the Steel Was Tempered

Nikolai Alekseyevich Ostrovsky (Russian: Николай Алексеевич Островский; Ukrainian: Микола Олексійович Островський, romanized: Mykola Oleksiiovych Ostrovskyi; 29 September 1904 – 22 December 1936) was a Soviet socialist realist writer. He is best known for his novel How the Steel Was Tempered.

== Life ==
Ostrovsky was born in the village of Viliya (today a village in Rivne Raion (until 2020 it was situated in Ostroh Raion), Rivne Oblast) in the Volhynian Governorate (Volhynia), then part of the Russian Empire, into a Ukrainian working-class family. He attended a parochial school until he was nine and was an honor student. In 1914, his family moved to the railroad town of Shepetivka (today in Khmelnytskyi Oblast) where Ostrovsky started working in the kitchens at the railroad station, a timber yard, then becoming a stoker's mate and then an electrician at the local power station. In 1917, at the age of thirteen he became a Bolshevik party activist. At the same period he developed ankylosing spondylitis, which would later blind and paralyze him.

According to the official biography, when the Germans occupied the town in the spring of 1918, Ostrovsky ran errands for the local Bolshevik underground. In July 1918 he joined the Komsomol and the Red Army in August. He served in the Kotovsky cavalry brigade. In 1920 he was reportedly wounded near Lviv and contracted typhus. He returned to the army only to be wounded again and was demobilized on medical grounds.

In 1921, he began working in railway workshops of Kiev as an electrician and as the secretary of the local Komsomol.

Having rheumatism and typhus, in August 1922 he was sent to Berdyansk, a resort on the Sea of Azov, for treatment. In October 1922 he was officially declared an invalid; however he continued working. In 1923 he was appointed Commissar of the Red Army's Second Training Battalion and Komsomol secretary for Berezdiv in western Ukraine. In January 1924 he went to Iziaslav as the head of Komsomol district committee and in August 1924 he joined the Communist Party. In 1925, with his health rapidly declining, he went to Kharkiv for medical treatment and in May 1926 he went to a sanatorium in the Crimea. By December 1926 polyarthritis deprived him of almost all mobility and he became virtually bedridden. In December 1927 Ostrovsky began a correspondence course at the Sverdlov Communist University in Moscow that he completed in June 1929. In August, he lost his vision.

Undaunted by his immobility and blindness, in 1930, he began work on his first novel, How the Steel Was Tempered, which became renowned and influential in the Communist world. He also wrote articles for newspapers and journals and spoke often on the radio. In April 1932 he became a member of the Moscow branch of the Association of Proletarian Writers and in June 1934 he joined the Union of Soviet Writers. On 1 October 1935, he was awarded the Order of Lenin.

After living for years with paralysis, illness and blindness due to congenital ankylosing spondylitis as well as complications from typhus, Ostrovsky died on 22 December 1936, aged 32. Because of his early death, he was unable to complete his second novel, Born of the Storm, on the Russian Civil War.

== Legacy ==
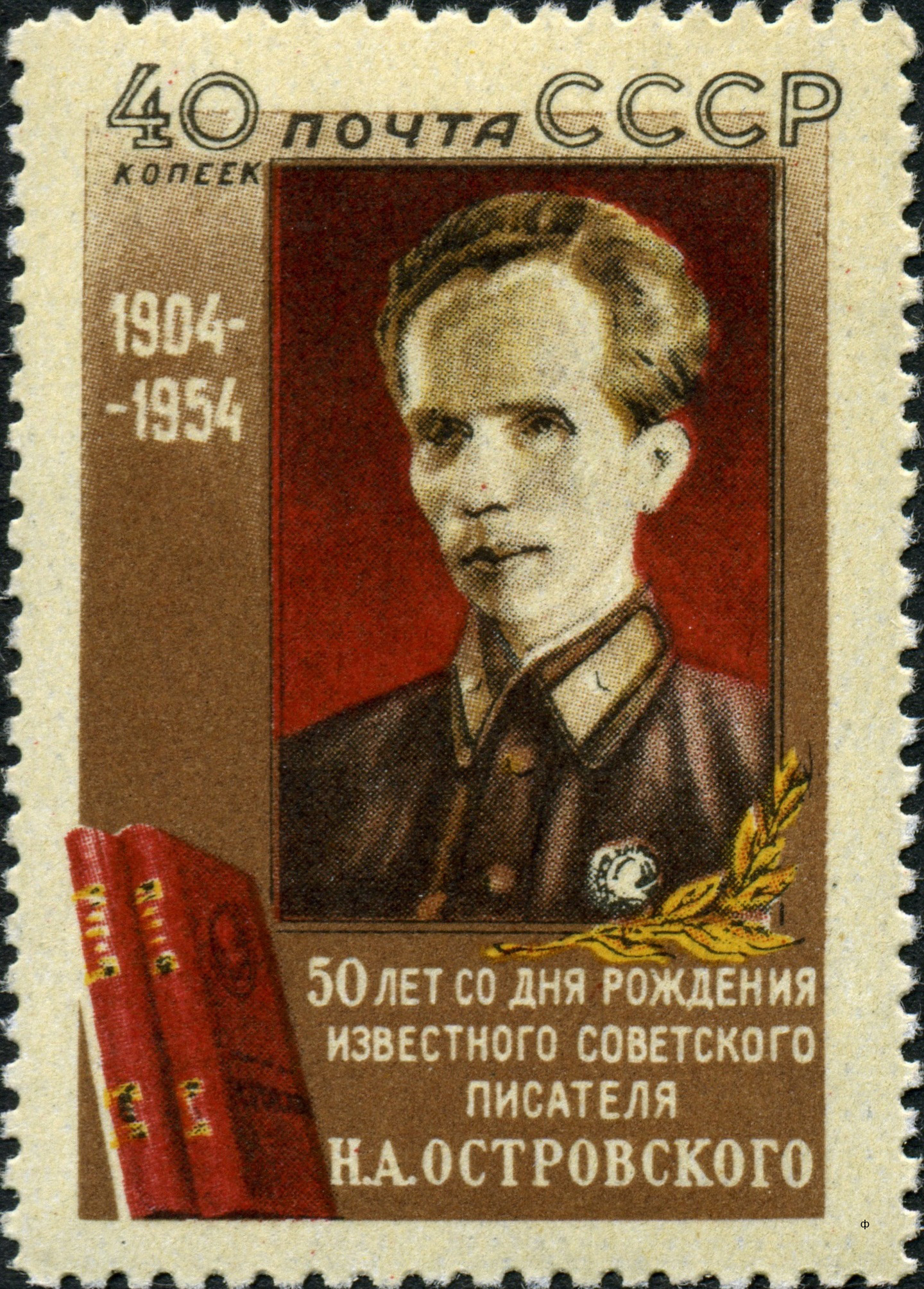
Ostrovsky on a 1954 postage stamp

His novel How the Steel Was Tempered is considered one of the most influential works of Communist literature. Even though it is considered relatively weak in terms of its artistic merit, the work influenced millions of readers in virtue of its passion for socialist worldview. In Moscow during the Communist period the Ostrovsky Museum and the Ostrovsky Humanitarian centre were built. They preserve his study and bedroom, while other exhibits include showcases of the achievements of disabled people like Nikolai Fenomenov and Ludmilla Rogova.

There also was established by the Central Committee of Komsomol of Ukraine the Ostrovsky Republican Prize.

The 2015 Ukrainian decommunization laws ban the use of Ostrovsky's name for the naming of public places. Hence Kyiv's Ostrovsky Park was renamed Mykola Zerov Park in 2020.

A monument to Ostrovsky in Shepetivka was dismantled in December 2022 after the Ukrainian Ministry of Culture and Information Policy had removed it from its list of "monumental art of local significance".

== Quotations ==
The dearest possession of any person is life. It is given only once, and it must not be lived only to feel tortured by regrets for wasted years or to know the burning shame of a mean and petty past; so live that when dying you have a right to say: all my life, all my strength was given to the finest cause in the world – the fight for the liberation of humankind.

== See also ==
- Outline of the Russian Revolution and Civil War
- Bibliography of the Russian Revolution and Civil War
- Bibliography of Stalinism and the Soviet Union
- Index of Old Bolsheviks
- Index of articles related to the Russian Revolution and Civil War

== Sources ==
- Елена Толстая-Сегал, К литературному фону книги : 'Как закалялась сталь', Cahiers du Monde Russe Année 1981 22-4 pp. 375–399
- Лев Аннинский, Обрученные с идеей (О повести 'Как закалялась сталь' Николая Островского)
- Раиса Островская, Николай Островский, серия ЖЗЛ, Молодая гвардия, 1984
- Евгений Бузни, Литературное досье Николая Островского
- Тамара Андронова, Слишком мало осталось жить... Николай Островский. Биография. – М.: Государственный музей – Гуманитарный центр «Преодоление» имени Н.А. Островского, 2014.
- Entry in the Encyclopedia of Soviet Writers
- Jurij Mycyk. Did the Author of Pavka Korchagin Take Part in the Civil War? (in Ukrainian)
- Bohdan Dem′janchuk. How Ostrovsky Was Tempered (in Ukrainian)
- Petro Kraljuk. The "Steel" Man from Shepetivka (in Ukrainian)
- Svitlana Kabachynsjka. Life Free from Shame (in Russian)
- The Nikolay Ostrovsky state museum - humanitarian center "Overcoming" at Google Cultural Institute
