= List of Soviet films of 1971 =

A list of films produced in the Soviet Union in 1971 (see 1971 in film).

== 1971 ==
Title	Original title	Director	Cast	Genre	Notes
1971
The Battle of Kerzhenets	Сеча при Керженце	Yuriy Norshteyn, Ivan Ivanov-Vano		Animation	
Belorussian Station	Белорусский вокзал	Andrei Smirnov	Yevgeny Leonov, Anatoli Papanov, Vsevolod Safonov, Aleksey Glazyrin	Drama	
Cheburashka	Чебурашка	Roman Abelevich Kachanov	Klara Rumyanova, Vasily Livanov	Animation	
The Crown of the Russian Empire, or Once Again the Elusive Avengers	Корона Российской Империи, или Снова Неуловимые	Edmond Keosayan	Viktor Kosykh; Valentina Kurdyukova; Michael Metyolkin	Adventure	
Dauria	Даурия	Viktor Tregubovich	Vitali Solomin, Petr Shelokhonov, Yefim Kopelyan, Vasily Shukshin	Adventure	
Drama from Ancient Life	Драма из старинной жизни	Ilya Averbakh	Yelena Solovey	Drama	
Find me, Lyonya!	Найди меня, Лёня!	Nikolay Lebedev	Anna Aleksakhina, Larisa Baranova, Viktor Chekmaryov, Aleksandr Demyanenko, Sergey Dvoretskiy	Drama	
Gentlemen of Fortune	Джентльмены удачи	Aleksandr Seryj	Yevgeni Leonov, Georgi Vitsin, Savely Kramarov	Comedy	
Goya or the Hard Way to Enlightenment	Гойя, или Тяжкий путь познания	Konrad Wolf	Donatas Banionis, Olivera Katarina, Fred Düren, Tatyana Lolova	Biopic	
Grandads-Robbers	Старики-разбойники	Eldar Ryazanov	Yuri Nikulin, Yevgeniy Yevstigneyev, Olga Aroseva, Georgi Burkov	Comedy	
King Lear	Король Лир	Grigori Kozintsev	Jüri Järvet, Elza Radzina, Galina Volchek	Tragedy	
Liberation: The Direction of the Main Blow	Освобождение: Направление главного удара	Yuri Ozerov	Nikolay Olyalin, Larisa Golubkina, Boris Seidenberg	War film	
Liberation: The Battle of Berlin/The Last Assault	Освобождение:Битва за Берлин, Последний штурм	Yuri Ozerov	Nikolay Olyalin, Larisa Golubkina, Boris Seidenberg	War film	
The Long Farewell	Долгие проводы	Kira Muratova	Zinaida Sharko	Drama	
Losharik	Лошарик	Ivan Ufimtsev	Rina Zelyonaya (voice)	Animated film	
A Man Before His Time	Преждевременный человек	Abram Room	Igor Kvasha	Drama	
A Necklace for My Beloved	Ожерелье для моей любимой	Tengiz Abuladze	Ramaz Giorgobiani, Nani Bregvadze, Erosi Manjgaladze	Comedy, drama	
Officers	Офицеры	Vladimir Rogovoy	Georgi Yumatov, Vasily Lanovoy	Drama	
Oh, That Nastya!	Ох уж эта Настя!	Yuri Pobedonostsev	Irina Volkova	Family	
Property of the Republic	Достоя́ние респу́блики	Vladimir Bychkov	Oleg Tabakov, Andrei Mironov, Vitya Galkin	Adventure	
Shadow	Тень	Nadezhda Kosheverova	Oleg Dal	Comedy	
A Soldier Came Back from the Front	Пришёл солдат с фронта	Nikolay Gubenko	Mikhail Gluzskiy	Drama	
Telegram	Телеграмма	Rolan Bykov	Nina Arkhipova	Drama	
Treasure Island	Остров сокровищ	Yevgeni Fridman		Adventure	
The Twelve Chairs	12 стульев	Leonid Gaidai	Archil Gomiashvili, Sergey Filippov, Mikhail Pugovkin, Natalya Krachkovskaya	Comedy	
Trial on the Road	Проверка на дорогах	Aleksei German	Rolan Bykov, Anatoly Solonitsyn, Vladimir Zamansky	War film	
Winnie-the-Pooh Pays a Visit	Винни-Пух идёт в гости	Fyodor Khitruk	Vladimir Osenev, Yevgeny Leonov, Iya Savvina, Anatoly Shchukin	Animation	
Yegor Bulychyov and Others	Егор Булычов и другие	Sergei Solovyov	Mikhail Ulyanov	Drama	
You and Me	Ты и я	Larisa Shepitko	Leonid Dyachkov	Drama	
