= 1926 in animation =

Events in 1926 in animation.

== Events ==
=== January ===
- Specific date unknown: The Disney Brothers Cartoon Studio is renamed Walt Disney Studio.

== Films released ==
- Unknown date:
  - Coast To Coast (United States)
  - The Huntsman (United States)
- 1 January – Alice on the Farm (United States)
- 10 January – Felix the Cat Spots the Spook (United States)
- 15 January:
  - Alice's Balloon Race (United States)
  - Alice's Orphan (United States)
- 23 January – The Wind Jammers (United States)
- 24 January – Felix the Cat Flirts with Fate (United States)
- February – The Adventures of Prince Achmed (Germany)
- 1 February – Alice's Little Parade (United States)
- 7 February – Felix the Cat in Blunderland (United States)
- 15 February – Alice's Mysterious Mystery (United States)
- 21 February – Felix the Cat Fans the Flames (United States)
- 7 March – Felix the Cat Laughs it Off (United States)
- 21 March – Felix the Cat Weathers the Weather (United States)
- 4 April – Felix the Cat Uses His Head (United States)
- 18 April – Felix the Cat Misses the Cue (United States)
- 2 May – Felix the Cat Braves the Briny (United States)
- 16 May – A Tale of Two Kitties (United States)
- 30 May – Felix the Cat Scoots Through Scotland (United States)
- 13 June – Felix the Cat Rings the Ringer (United States)
- 27 June – School Daze (United States)
- 4 July – Jungle Sports (United States)
- 11 July – Felix the Cat Seeks Solitude (United States)
- 25 July – Felix the Cat Misses His Swiss (United States)
- 8 August – Gym Gems (United States)
- 22 August – Two-Lip Time (United States)
- 5 September – Scrambled Yeggs (United States)
- 6 September – Alice Charms the Fish (United States)
- 15 September – Dog Gone (United States)
- 17 September:
  - A Knight Out (United States)
  - Why Argue (United States)
- 19 September – Felix the Cat Shatters the Sheik (United States)
- 20 September – Alice's Monkey Business (United States)
- 3 October – Felix the Cat Hunts the Hunter (United States)
- 4 October – Alice in the Wooly West (United States)
- 17 October – Land O' Fancy (United States)
- 18 October – Alice the Fire Fighter (United States)
- 26 October:
  - Buck Fever (United States)
  - Through Thick and Thin (United States)
- 31 October – Felix the Cat Bursts a Bubble (United States)
- 1 November – Alice Cuts the Ice (United States)
- 14 November – Reverse English (United States)
- 15 November – Alice Helps the Romance (United States)
- 28 November – Felix the Cat Trumps the Ace (United States)
- 29 November – Alice's Spanish Guitar (United States)
- 12 December – Felix the Cat Collars the Button (United States)
- 13 December – Alice's Brown Derby (United States)
- 27 December – Alice the Lumberjack (United States)
- 28 December – Zoo Logic (United States)
- 31 December – Where Friendship Ceases (United States)

== Births ==
=== January ===
- January 8: Soupy Sales, American comedian, actor, radio/television personality and jazz aficionado (voice of the title character in the Donkey Kong segment of Saturday Supercade), (d. 2009).
- January 13: Michael Bond, English author (Paddington Bear, The Herbs, The Adventures of Parsley), (d. 2017).

=== February ===
- February 6: Walker Edmiston, American actor (voice of Ernie the Keebler Elf from The Keebler Company, Squiddly Diddly and Yakky Doodle in Yogi's Ark Lark, various characters in Down and Dirty Duck, Inferno in The Transformers, Sir Thornberry in Adventures of the Gummi Bears, Whizzer in Spider-Man, Fire Lord Azulon in the Avatar: The Last Airbender episode "Zuko Alone", Marty in the Ben 10 episode "Permanent Retirement"), (d. 2007).
- February 8: Allan Rich, American actor (voice of Edward "King" Barlowe in The New Batman Adventures episode "Joker's Millions"), (d. 2020).
- February 11: Leslie Nielsen, Canadian-American producer (The Secret World of Benjamin Bear), actor and comedian (voice of the Narrator in The Railway Dragon and Katie and Orbie, Boomer in Pumper Pups, the title character in Zeroman), (d. 2010).
- February 14: Al Brodax, American film and television producer (Paramount, King Features, The Beatles, Yellow Submarine), (d. 2016).
- February 16: David Frankham, British actor (voice of Sergeant Tibbs in One Hundred and One Dalmatians).
- February 22: Kenneth Williams, British comedian and actor (the narrator and other voices in Willo the Wisp), (d. 1988).
- February 27: Manuel Antín, Argentinian director (voice of Sr. Tecnologia in Mercano el Marciano), (d. 2024).

=== March ===
- March 7: Alan Sues, American actor and comedian (voice of Sir Leonard Looney in Raggedy Ann and Andy: A Musical Adventure, Scratcher in Rudolph and Frosty's Christmas in July), (d. 2011).
- March 16: Jerry Lewis, American comedian, actor, singer, director, producer, writer and humanitarian (voice of the title character in The Nutty Professor, Stationmaster in Curious George 2: Follow That Monkey!, Professor John Frink, Sr. in The Simpsons episode "Treehouse of Horror XIV"), (d. 2017).
- March 18: Peter Graves, American actor (voice of General Warning and the Narrator in The Angry Beavers episode "The Day the World Got Really Screwed Up", Instructor Voice in the Mickey Mouse Works episode "How To Be A Spy", Sheldon Miller in the Minoriteam episode "Tax Day", Mr. Pibb in the American Dad! episode "A.T. the Abusive Terrestrial"), (d. 2010).
- March 25: Gene Shalit, American journalist, television personality, critic and author (voice of Gene Scallop in the SpongeBob SquarePants episode "The Krusty Sponge", himself in The Critic episodes "Pilot", "Marty's First Date" and "Siskel and Ebert & Jay & Alice"), (d. 2026).

=== April ===
- April 1: Jack Grimes, American actor (voice of Jimmy Olsen in The New Adventures of Superman, Sparky and Chim-Chim in Speed Racer), (d. 2009).
- April 5: Roger Corman, American director and producer (Little Shop, Fire and Ice, Aladdin and the Adventure of All Time) and actor (Hollywood Director in Looney Tunes: Back in Action), (d. 2024).
- April 7: Miyoko Asō, Japanese actress (voice of Fune Isono in Sazae-san, Pinako Rockbell in Fullmetal Alchemist, Cologne in Ranma ½), (d. 2018).
- April 8: David Detiege, American film director (The Man from Button Willow, Shinbone Alley), animation writer (Warner Bros. Cartoons), animator, producer, and director, (d. 1984).
- April 9: Hugh Hefner, American magazine editor (voiced himself in The Simpsons episode "Krusty Gets Kancelled", the Family Guy episode "Airport '07", and the Robot Chicken episode "Drippy Pony"), (d. 2017).
- April 12: Jane Withers, American actress (voice of Laverne in The Hunchback of Notre Dame and The Hunchback of Notre Dame II), (d. 2021).
- April 22: Charlotte Rae, American actress, comedian, and singer (voice of Aunt Pristine Figg in Tom and Jerry: The Movie, Adrienne Van Leydon in Itsy Bitsy Spider, Nanny in 101 Dalmatians: The Series), (d. 2018).
- April 30: Cloris Leachman, American actress and comedian (voice of Hydia in My Little Pony: The Movie, Gran in The Croods franchise, Granny Goodness in Justice League Action, Old Female Airplane Passenger in Beavis and Butt-Head Do America, Mrs. Tensedge in The Iron Giant, Anne Doofenshmirtz in Phineas and Ferb, Old Marceline in Adventure Time, Dola in Castle in the Sky, Mrs. Glick in The Simpsons episode "Three Men and a Comic Book"), (d. 2021).

=== May ===
- May 8: Don Rickles, American comedian and actor (voice of Mr. Potato Head in the Toy Story franchise, Cornwall in Quest for Camelot), (d. 2017).
- May 13: Norman Maurer, American comics artist, animator, screenwriter, and film producer (Hanna-Barbera), (d. 1986).
- May 15: Regis Cordic, American actor (voice of Diablo in Fantastic Four, Apache Chief and Black Manta in The All-New Super Friends Hour, Bald Doctor in Puff the Magic Dragon, The Clock in The Mouse and His Child, Quintessons and Menasor in The Transformers), (d. 1999).
- May 24: Stanley Baxter, Scottish actor (voice of Gofer and Slap in The Thief and the Cobbler, Maisie Mac in Meeow!), (d. 2025).
- May 28: Bob Ogle, American actor (voice of Kwicky Koala in The Kwicky Koala Show, Digger the Mole in Shirt Tales), animator and writer (Hanna-Barbera), (d. 1984).

=== June ===
- June 1: Andy Griffith, American actor, comedian, television producer, singer and writer (voice of the Narrator in Frosty's Winter Wonderland, Santa Claus in Christmas Is Here Again), (d. 2012).
- June 13: Paul Lynde, American comedian and actor (voice of Templeton in Charlotte's Web, Mildew Wolf in Cattanooga Cats, Claude Pertwee in Where's Huddles?, Sylvester Sneekly/The Hooded Claw in The Perils of Penelope Pitstop), (d. 1982).
- June 16:
  - Jack Curtis, American actor (voice of Pops Racer in Speed Racer), (d. 1970).
  - Roberto Gavioli, Italian animator (Once Upon a Time, The Night the Animals Talked), (d. 2007).
- June 28: Mel Brooks, American actor, comedian and filmmaker (voice of the narrator in The Critic, Wiley in Jakers! The Adventures of Piggley Winks, Bigweld in Robots, President Skroob and Yogurt in Spaceballs: The Animated Series, Albert Einstein in Mr. Peabody and Sherman, Vlad in Hotel Transylvania 2 and Hotel Transylvania 3: Summer Vacation, Rogman in The Guardian Brothers, Luteau in Leap!, Melephant Brooks in Toy Story 4 and Forky Asks a Question, The Shogun in Paws of Fury: The Legend of Hank, Mad Hatter in the Dora the Explorer episode "Dora in Wonderland", Santa Claus in The Adventures of Jimmy Neutron, Boy Genius episode "Holly Jolly Jimmy", Canine in the Glenn Martin, DDS episode "A Very Martin Christmas", Grandpa Mel in the Special Agent Oso episode "On Old MacDonald's Special Song", himself in The Simpsons episode "Homer vs. Patty and Selma").

=== July ===
- July 14: Harry Dean Stanton, American actor, musician and singer (voice of Balthazar in Rango), (d. 2017).

=== August ===
- August 3: Tony Bennett, American singer (voiced himself in The Simpsons, provided Bobgoblin's singing voice in the Wallykazam! episode "Wally Saves the Trollidays"), (d. 2023).
- August 7: Stan Freberg, American comedian and actor (voice of the beaver in Lady and the Tramp, Junior Bear and Pete Puma in Looney Tunes, Mo-Ron in Freakazoid!, Dr. Whipple in The Garfield Show), (d. 2015).
- August 14: René Goscinny, French comics writer, artist, magazine publisher animation director (Asterix and Cleopatra, Daisy Town, The 12 Tasks of Asterix, La Ballade des Dalton), (d. 1977).
- August 22: Sandy Wogatzke, American animation checker (Jetsons: The Movie), (d. 2022).

=== September ===
- September 2: Yevgeny Leonov, Soviet and Russian actor (voice of the title character in Winnie-the-Pooh, Winnie-the-Pooh Pays a Visit, and Winnie-the-Pooh and a Busy Day), (d. 1994).
- September 7: Don Messick, American actor (voice of Boo-Boo Bear and Ranger Smith in Yogi Bear, Benton Quest in Jonny Quest, Bamm-Bamm Rubble in The Flintstones, Astro in The Jetsons, Muttley in Wacky Races and Dastardly and Muttley in Their Flying Machines, the title character in the Scooby-Doo franchise, Dr. Vernon Danger in the Freakazoid! episode "Toby Danger in Doomsday Bet"), (d. 1997).
- September 16: Tommy Bond, American actor (voice of Beans in Looney Tunes, speaking voice of Owl Jolson in I Love to Singa), (d. 2005).
- September 19: James Lipton, American writer, lyricist and actor (voice of The Director in Bolt, himself in The Simpsons episodes "The Sweetest Apu" and "Homer the Father"), (d. 2020).
- September 23: Henry Silva, American actor (voice of Bane in the DC Animated Universe), (d. 2022).
- September 28: Larry Roberts, American actor (voice of Tramp in Lady and the Tramp), (d. 1992).
- September 29: Russ Heath, American comic book artist and animator (G.I. Joe: A Real American Hero), (d. 2018).

=== October ===
- October 1: Ben Wicks, English-born Canadian cartoonist, illustrator, journalist and author (co-creator of Katie and Orbie), (d. 2000).
- October 11: Earle Hyman, American actor (voice of Panthro in ThunderCats), (d. 2017).
- October 12: Antonia Rey, Cuban-born American actress (portrayed Assunta Bianchi in Happy!, voice of Abuela and Wizzles in Dora the Explorer, additional voices in Courage the Cowardly Dog), (d. 2019).
- October 18: Yoram Gross, Polish-born Australian producer (Dot and the Kangaroo and its sequels), (d. 2015).
- October 21: Jack Taylor, American actor (English dub voice of Prince Finlap in Guliver's Travels, Kyochi Saionji in Adolescence of Utena), (d. 2026).
- October 23: G. Stanley Jones, Canadian actor (voice of Lex Luthor in Challenge of the Superfriends, Riff Raff in Heathcliff), (d. 1998).

=== November ===
- November 2: Howard Post, American animator, cartoonist, and comic strip and comic book writer-artist (Famous Studios), (d. 2010).
- November 7: Kay Hawtrey, Canadian actress (voice of Emily's Grandmother in Little Bear, Grandma in Max & Ruby, Miss Primrose in The Raccoons episode "Making the Grade!"), (d. 2021).
- November 8: Jack Mendelsohn, American writer-artist (Hanna-Barbera, Yellow Submarine, Teenage Mutant Ninja Turtles), (d. 2017).
- November 14: Tom Hatten, American cartoonist, TV presenter (host of The Popeye Show) and actor (voice of Farmer Fitzgibbons in The Secret of NIMH), (d. 2019).
- November 16: Joan Gardner, American actress (voice of Spunky in The Adventures of Spunky and Tadpole, Mrs. Wetworth in Snorks), (d. 1992).
- November 29: Gordon Peters, English actor and comedian (voice of Characters of Mr. Men and Little Miss), (d. 2022).

=== December ===
- December 11: Dick Tufeld, American actor, announcer, and narrator (announcer and narrator for Spider-Man and His Amazing Friends, Spider-Woman, Super Friends: The Legendary Super Powers Show, The Super Powers Team: Galactic Guardians, Fantastic Four, Histeria!, voiced the Robot from Lost in Space in The Simpsons episodes "Mayored to the Mob" and "Milhouse Doesn't Live Here Anymore"), (d. 2012).
- December 12: Roman Kroitor, Canadian filmmaker (Universe, creator of SANDDE), (d. 2012).
- December 16: Jeffrey Stone, American model (model for Prince Charming in Cinderella), (d. 2012).
- December 19: Eckart Dux, German actor (German dub voice of Man-E-Faces in He-Man and the Masters of the Universe), (d. 2024).
- December 22: José Luis Moro, Spanish animator and comics artist (La Familia Telerín), (d. 2015).

== Deaths ==
=== August ===
- August 7: T. S. Sullivant, American cartoonist, (the anatomical accuracy of his work was greatly helped by Eadweard Muybridge's photographic studies of human and animal movement. It was the visuals and the action in his cartoons that were most often the "gag"—frequently the caption added little to the enjoyment of the cartoon. Sullivant had an enormous influence on the early history of American animation, second perhaps after Winsor McCay. He was especially influential in the Walt Disney Studios after T. Hee brought in a collection of Sullivant clippings to use as inspiration for the "Dance of the Hours" sequence in Fantasia. His influence is also apparent in the Walrus in Alice in Wonderland and the elephants in Dumbo), dies at age 71.
