= Yuriy Dubrovin =

Russian-Ukrainian actor (1939–2022)

Yuriy Dmitriyevich Dubrovin (Russian: Юрий Дми́триевич Дубро́вин; 1 August 1939 – 4 December 2022) was a Russian-Ukrainian actor. Merited Artist of the Russian Federation (2007).

Among roles he played was La Chenet in D'Artagnan and Three Musketeers. He also appeared in Trial on the Road, and The Prisoner of Château d'If.

== Career ==
He debuted in 1959. Since 1963 he worked at Dovzhenko Film Studios in Kyiv. He acted in almost 140 films. He moved to Germany to his son's family in 2014. In 2016 he appeared in short film by his grandson, Ivan.

He was described as a "king of episodes" in cinema, having played episodic roles in dozens of marquee films.

== Selected filmography ==
- Seven Winds (1962) as Senechka
- A Span of Earth (1964) as battalion orderly
- The Alive and the Dead (1964) as Zolotaryov
- We, the Russian People (1965) as Vyatskiy
- No Password Necessary (1967) as police officer
- At War as at War (1968) as soldier Gromykhalo
- Sergey Lazo (1968) as Korolyov
- Liberation (1970) as messenger man
- Dauria (1971) as Kuzma
- How the Steel Was Tempered (1968) as Tonya Tumanova's father
- Love at First Sight (1977) as gardener
- Widows (1978) as investigator
- Twenty Days Without War (1978) as Yolkin
- Lone Wolf (1978) as first man
- D'Artagnan and Three Musketeers (1978) as La Chenet
- Who will pay for Luck? (1980) as Paramonov
- Love by Request (1983) as Petrushin
- Wartime Romance (1983) as Terekhin
- Trial on the Road (1985) as Gennady Bolshakov
- Lilac Ball (1987) as episode
- The Prisoner of Château d'If (1987) as Baptiste, Count of Monte Cristo's servant
- Criminal Talent (1988) as educator Snegirev
- Musketeers Twenty Years After (1992) as La Chenet
- The Secret of Queen Anne or Musketeers Thirty Years After (1993) as La Chenet
- Life and Extraordinary Adventures of Private Ivan Chonkin (1994) as Volkov
- The Outskirts (1998) as Philip Ilyich Safronov
- Yesenin (2005) as Sergey Yesenin's grandfather
