= Vladimir Zamansky =

Soviet and Russian actor (born 1926)

- Владимир Заманский
- Born: 6 February 1926 (age 100); Kremenchuk, Ukrainian SSR, Soviet Union
- Occupation: Actor
- Years active: 1958–2002
- Spouse: Natalya Klimova

Vladimir Petrovich Zamansky (Russian: Владимир Петрович Заманский; born 6 February 1926) is a Soviet and Russian stage and film actor. He was named a People's Artist of the RSFSR in 1989, the highest honorary title awarded to performing artists in the Russian Soviet Federative Socialist Republic.

== Biography ==
As a boy, Zamansky grew up without a father, and in 1941, when the Germans entered Kremenchuk, he was left without a mother. Deceiving the commission and adding to his age, he joined the Red Army and volunteered to go to the front. In the winter of 1942 he became a student of the Tashkent Polytechnic, Communications, and in 1943 he was drafted into the Red Army. He fought from May 1944, and in one occasion saved his commander from their burning M10 Wolverine. In June 1944 he served as a radio operator in 1223th self-propelled artillery regiment of the 3rd Belorussian Front during a breakthrough near Orsha. As part of the regiment with a short break due to injury he served until the end of the war. After the war, as part of a military unit p / n 74256 in the Northern Group of Forces (Poland) he continued to serve in the Soviet Army.

In 1950, for participating in the beating of a platoon commander he was sentenced by the Military Tribunal to nine years imprisonment under article 193-B of the Criminal Code of the RSFSR. Among other prisoners he worked on construction sites in Kharkiv, and on the Main building of Moscow State University. For high-altitude life-threatening operation his prison term was reduced. He was released in 1954. After the amnesty, for applied for admission to theater school.

In 1958, he graduated from the Moscow Art Theatre School (course Gerasimov). From 1958–1966, he was an actor in the Moscow theater Sovremennik Theatre. From 1972 until 1980, he was a theatre-studio movie actor, and, since 1992 he was at the theater Yermolova.

He married actress Natalya Klimova (The Snow Queen) in 1962. In 1998, he retired, and together with her settled in Murom, where they lived together until her death in 2026.

On 6 February 2026, he turned 100.

== Filmography ==
- Lullaby (1959) – Andrei Petryanu
- The Steamroller and the Violin (1961) – Sergei
- On Seven Winds (1962) – Vladimir Petrovich Vasilyev
- The Bridge Is Built (1965) – Aleksandr Vasilyevich Perov
- Man without a Passport (1966) – Aleksandr Matveyevich Ryabich
- Liberation (1970) – Pavel Batov
- Mission in Kabul (1970) – Aleksei Repin
- The Flight (1970) – Bayev
- Trial on the Road (1971; released in 1986) – Aleksandr Lazarev
- Point, Point, Comma... (1972) – Karetnikov, Zhenya's father
- Solaris (1972) – Kris Kelvin's voice (role played by Donatas Banionis)
- Goaway and Twobriefcases (1974) – Pal Palych
- Day of Admittance on Personal Matters (1974) – Oleg Palmin
- Front Without Flanks (1975) – Nikolai Sergeyevich
- Untypical Story (1977) – Military commissar
- Eternal Call (1977) – Fyodor Fyodorovich Nechayev
- The Second Attempt of Viktor Krokhin (1977) – Stanislav Aleksandrovich
- In the Zone of Special Attention (1978) – Guards colonel
- Allegro Con Brio (1979) – Mikhail Ivanovich Ivankov
- Stalker (1979) – Professor's telephone interlocutor
- Do Not Shoot at White Swans (1980) – Mikhail Matveyevich, tourist
- Who will pay for Luck? (1980) – Commissioner (uncredited)
- The Shore (1984) – Zykin
- Mournful Unconcern (1987) – Madzini
- Tomorrow Was the War (1987) – Leonid Sergeyevich Lyuberetsky, Vika's father
- Days of Eclipse (1988) – Snegovoy
- 100 Days Before the Command (1990) – The Unknown Man

== Awards and honors ==
- Medal "For Courage" (1945)
- Honored Artist of the RSFSR (1974)
- Order of the Patriotic War, 2nd class (1985)
- USSR State Prize (1988) – for the film Trial on the Road
- People's Artist of the RSFSR (1989)
- Order of Honour (2009)
- Order of Alexander Nevsky (2021)
- Order of Holy Prince Daniel of Moscow, 3rd class (2021)
- Order of Holy Prince Daniel of Moscow, 1st class (2026)
- Medal of Zhukov
