= Vladimir Zuykov =

Russian film animator

- Born: 27 January 1935; Moscow, Russian SFSR
- Died: 25 February 2021 (aged 86); Moscow, Russia
- Occupation: Film Animator

Vladimir Zuykov (Russian: Владимир Зуйков; 27 January 1935 – 25 February 2021) was a Russian film animator, artist, and illustrator. He became an Honored Artist of the Russian Soviet Federated Socialist Republic in 1989.

== Biography ==
Born in Moscow in 1935, Zuykov attended the Moscow Municipal Pedagogical Institute V. P. Potemkin and graduated in 1956. He subsequently worked as a schoolteacher before getting a job with Soyuzmultfilm as a production designer in 1967. He worked in the field of hand-drawn animation and worked along with directors such as Fyodor Khitruk, Gennady Sokolsky, Valeriy Ugarov, and others. He participated in the drawing of more than 30 feature films.

Zuykov began teaching at the Gerasimov Institute of Cinematography in 2002, giving lectures on directing animated films. In addition to his film career, he illustrated books by authors such as Kir Bulychev, Astrid Lindgren, A. A. Milne, Grigoriy Oster, Otfried Preußler, Oscar Wilde, and Annie M. G. Schmidt. His works can be found in museums and private collections in Russia and abroad.

Vladimir Zuykov died of COVID-19 on 25 February 2021, at the age of 86, during the COVID-19 pandemic in Russia.

== Filmography ==
- Film, Film, Film (1968)
- Zigzag of Success (1968)
- Winnie-the-Pooh (1969)
- Winnie-the-Pooh Pays a Visit (1971)
- Fitil (1971)
- Winnie-the-Pooh and a Busy Day (1972)
- The Love of Mankind (1972)
- The Flight of Mr. McKinley (1975)
- O Sport, You Are Peace! (1981)
- About an Old Man, an Old Woman and Their Hen Ryaba (1982)

== Illustrated books ==
- KOAPP! KOAPP! KOAPP! 8 vols. Moscow: Iskusstvo, 1969–1978
