= Anda (given name) =

Female given name

- Gender: Female
- Name day: 20 November

Origin
- Origin: From Andrejs (“Andrew”) or Amanda
- Region of origin: Latvia

Other names
- Related names: Andra

Anda is a Latvian feminine given name. The associated name day is 20 November.

== Notable people named Anda ==
- Anda Eibele (born 1984), Latvian basketball player
- Anda Šafranska (born 1960), Latvian chess player
- Anda Zaice (born 1941), Latvian actress
