= Subject for a Short Story =

1969 film by Sergei Yutkevich

- Russian: Сюжет для небольшого рассказа
- Directed by: Sergei Yutkevich
- Written by: Leonid Malyugin
- Starring: Nikolai Grinko; Marina Vlady; Iya Savvina; Rolan Bykov; Aleksandra Panova; Yevgeny Lebedev
- Cinematography: Naum Ardashnikov
- Edited by: Klavdiya Aleyeva
- Music by: Rodion Shchedrin
- Release date: 1969
- Countries: Soviet Union; France
- Language: Russian

Left to right: Nikolai Grinko, Marina Vlady and Iya Savvina in a scene from the film.

Subject for a Short Story (Russian: Сюжет для небольшого рассказа, romanized: Syuzhet dlya nebolshogo rasskaza) is a 1969 Soviet-French biographical drama film directed by Sergei Yutkevich.

== Plot ==
The film tells about the life of Anton Pavlovich Chekhov, the process of creating the play The Seagull, the production on the stage of the Alexandrinsky Theatre, and his relationship with Lika Mizinova.

== Cast ==
- Nikolai Grinko as Anton Pavlovich Chekhov
- Marina Vlady as Lika Mizinova
- Iya Savvina as Mariya Pavlovna Chekhova
- Rolan Bykov as Mikhail Pavlovich Chekhov
- Aleksandra Panova as Yevgeniya Yakovlevna Chekhova
- Yevgeny Lebedev
- Yury Yakovlev as Potapenko
- Leonid Gallis as Gilyarovskiy
- Vladimir Osenev as Kurbatov
- Yekaterina Vasilyeva as Ovchinnikova
