= Winnie-the-Pooh and a Busy Day =

1972 animated short film

- Image from the film
- Directed by: Fyodor Khitruk; Gennady Sokolsky
- Starring: Vladimir Osenev; Yevgeny Leonov; Iya Savvina; Erast Garin; Zinaida Naryshkina
- Music by: Mieczysław Weinberg
- Release date: 1972
- Running time: 20 minutes
- Country: Soviet Union
- Language: Russian

Winnie-the-Pooh and a Busy Day (Russian: Винни-Пух и день забот, romanized: Vinni-Pukh i den zabot, or Winnie the Pooh and the Day of Troubles in the English dub title) is a 1972 animated short film by Soyuzmultfilm, directed by Fyodor Khitruk and Gennady Sokolsky. Based on the book series by A. A. Milne, it is the final part of a trilogy, following Winnie-the-Pooh (1969) and Winnie-the-Pooh Pays a Visit (1971). Twice longer than either of its predecessors, this installment is co-written by Khitruk and Boris Zakhoder, with prototype drawings created by Khitruk and Vladimir Zuykov.

Eeyore and Owl make their first appearance in the trilogy, while Winnie-the-Pooh, Piglet, and the narrator all return. (Rabbit appears only in the second installment.) Once they learn it's Eeyore's birthday, his friends attempt to mark the occasion.

== Plot ==
Eeyore, an old gray donkey, stands by a lake feeling sad. Winnie-the-Pooh arrives and learns that it's Eeyore's birthday, which everyone seems to have forgotten. Pooh also notices that Eeyore has lost his tail. Determined to cheer him up, Pooh decides to find a gift.

Pooh meets Piglet, who also wants to celebrate Eeyore's birthday. Pooh plans to give a pot of honey, while Piglet offers a green balloon. However, Pooh eats the honey on his way to Owl's house and asks Owl to write a birthday message on the empty pot. Meanwhile, Piglet hurries to deliver his balloon but accidentally pops it after tripping. Saddened, he arrives at Eeyore's with the broken balloon and explains what happened. Pooh then brings the empty pot and suggests it can hold the remains of the balloon, which fits perfectly. The celebration becomes complete when Owl returns Eeyore's missing tail, which Pooh ties back on with a bow. The group shares a joyful song, turning the forgotten birthday into a heartwarming celebration.

== Cast ==
- Vladimir Osenev as the narrator.
- Yevgeny Leonov as Winnie-the-Pooh.
- Iya Savvina as Piglet.
- Erast Garin as Eeyore. Garin was the only actor invited at early stages of writing the trilogy – all others were recruited at the recording stage.
- Zinaida Naryshkina as Owl. Although Naryshkina was an experienced actress, Khitruk knew nothing about her before the auditions; he immediately liked her acting and started recording her right at the auditions.

== Legacy and awards ==
In 1976 Khitruk was awarded the USSR State Prize for the Winnie-the-Pooh trilogy. The animation characters, as designed by Khitruk's team, are featured on the 1988 Soviet and 2012 Russian postal stamps; they are permanently painted on a public streetcar running through the Sokolniki Park, and their sculptures are installed in Ramenki District in Moscow.

When Khitruk visited the Disney Studios, Wolfgang Reitherman, the author of Winnie the Pooh and the Blustery Day that won the 1968 Academy Award for Best Animated Short Film, told him that he liked the Soviet version better than his own.
