= To Love =

To Love may refer to:

- To Love (1964 film), Swedish drama film written and directed by Jörn Donner
- To Love (1968 film), a Soviet drama film
- To Love (1997 film), a Japanese film directed by Kei Kumai
- To Love (Faye Wong album), 2003 album by Chinese singer Faye Wong
- To Love (Kana Nishino album), 2010 album by Japanese singer Kana Nishino
