= The Big Ore =

1964 film directed by Vasily Ordynsky

- Directed by: Vasily Ordynsky
- Written by: Georgi Vladimov
- Starring: Yevgeni Urbansky; Mikhail Gluzsky; Larisa Luzhina; Stanislav Lyubshin; Inna Makarova
- Cinematography: German Lavrov
- Music by: Mikael Tariverdiev
- Production company: Mosfilm
- Release date: 1964
- Running time: 88 minutes
- Country: Soviet Union
- Language: Russian

The Big Ore (Russian: Больша́я руда́, romanized: Bolshaya ruda) is a 1964 drama film directed by Vasily Ordynsky and based on the novel by Georgi Vladimov.

== Plot ==
Victor Pronyakin (Eugene Urbansky), returned from the army to his fiancée (Svetlana Zhgun), but realizing she hadn't been faithful, he left abruptly and met another woman at a station buffet. After working for some time in Crimea, Victor decided to go work at the "big" Kursk ore mine, where work was in full swing — everyone awaited the first shipment of ore. Foreman (Vsevolod Sanaev) gave him a battered MAZ truck, but determined Victor restored the vehicle. Rain started, making it dangerous to haul loaded trucks from the quarry. However, Victor persisted, alienating the brigade against himself. Finally, he was transporting the first load of the "big ore," but the truck overturned on an incline. Victor died during the operation. His wife, Tamara, went to see him and saw the first train with the ore and people rejoicing, unaware that he was no longer alive.

== Cast ==
- Yevgeni Urbansky as Victor Pronyakin
- Mikhail Gluzsky as experienced chauffeur
- Larisa Luzhina as Vera
- Stanislav Lyubshin as Antonov
- Inna Makarova as Tamara, wife Pronyakin
- Vsevolod Sanaev as Brigadier Matsuev
- Roman Homyatov as young driver
- Vladimir Troshin as driver
- Valentin Nikulin as Vladimir
- Georgiy Zhzhonov as surgeon
- Maya Kristalinskaya as song overs

== See also ==
- The Communist (film)
