= Winnie-the-Pooh Pays a Visit =

1971 animated short film directed by Fyodor Khitruk

- Image from the film.
- Directed by: Fyodor Khitruk
- Written by: Fyodor Khitruk; Boris Zakhoder
- Starring: Vladimir Osenev; Yevgeny Leonov; Iya Savvina; Anatoly Shchukin
- Cinematography: Mikhail Druyan
- Music by: Mieczysław Weinberg
- Distributed by: Soyuzmultfilm
- Release date: 1971
- Running time: 10 minutes
- Country: Soviet Union
- Language: Russian

Winnie-the-Pooh Pays a Visit (Russian: Винни-Пух идёт в гости, romanized: Vinni-Pukh idyot v gosti) is a 1971 animated film by Soyuzmultfilm directed by Fyodor Khitruk. The film is based on chapter two in the book series by A. A. Milne. It is the second part of a trilogy, following Winnie-the-Pooh (1969) and preceding Winnie-the-Pooh and a Busy Day (1972).

The second part closely follows the first one: it is co-written by Khitruk and Boris Zakhoder and is based on the Pooh's love for honey; its prototype drawings are two dimensional and are created by Khitruk and Vladimir Zuikov. A new character (Rabbit) is added to the core cast of the first part: Winnie-the-Pooh, the narrator, and the Piglet.

== Plot ==
One morning, Winnie-the-Pooh was strolling leisurely with Piglet, composing a new song. During their walk, Pooh got the idea to visit someone. Singing the song "Who Visits in the Morning"—which Pooh had just made up—they set off at random.

Eventually, they arrive at Rabbit's burrow. Despite arriving uninvited, Rabbit welcomes his friends and offers them honey and condensed milk (during the snack, Pooh unknowingly tied a napkin over Piglet's mouth). However, Pooh ends up eating all of Rabbit's supplies, except for some honey left for Piglet. When Pooh tries to leave the burrow, he gets stuck in the entrance due to his swollen belly.

Pulling him out proves impossible, and Rabbit suggests waiting a week for Pooh to slim down. At one point, Pooh sneezes, destroying Rabbit's balcony, and announces that he has lost enough weight. Rabbit and Piglet then pull him free. Pooh learns his lesson: one shouldn't overstay their welcome to avoid getting into "sticky situations."

== Cast ==
- Vladimir Osenev as the narrator.
- Yevgeny Leonov as Winnie-the-Pooh.
- Iya Savvina as Piglet.
- Anatoly Shchukin as Rabbit.

== Legacy and awards ==
In 1976 Khitruk was awarded the USSR State Prize for the Winnie-the-Pooh trilogy. The animation characters, as designed by Khitruk's team, are featured on the 1988 Soviet and 2012 Russian postal stamps; they are permanently painted on a public streetcar running through the Sokolniki Park, and their sculptures are installed in Ramenki District in Moscow.

When Khitruk visited the Disney Studios, Wolfgang Reitherman, the director of Winnie the Pooh and the Blustery Day, which won the 1968 Academy Award for Best Animated Short Film, told him that he liked the Soviet version better than his own.
