= The Outskirts (1998 film) =

- US 2004 DVD cover
- Directed by: Pyotr Lutsik
- Written by: Pyotr Lutsik
- Starring: Yuri Dubrovin; Nikolay Olyalin
- Cinematography: Nikolay Ivasiv
- Edited by: Svetlana Guralskaya
- Music by: Gavriil Popov
- Production company: Goskino
- Distributed by: Facets Multimedia (USA)
- Release date: 1998 (Russia)
- Running time: 95 minutes
- Country: Russia
- Language: Russian

The Outskirts (Russian: Окраина, meaning Outskirts), also known by the transliterated Russian title Okraina, is a 1998 Russian film starring Yuri Dubrovin, Nikolay Olyalin, Alexey Pushkin and Alexey Vanin. Loosely based on Boris Barnet's 1933 film Outskirts, it was directed and written by Pyotr Lutsik.

== Synopsis ==
The film starts as parody of a Soviet-era socialist realist film-making of the 1930s (The title is taken from the classic 1933 film by the Soviet filmmaker Boris Barnet, in which the beginning of the farm collectivization era is depicted.)

Peaceful life of farmers of remote Uralian village is interrupted when their former collective farm is sold. The toughest ones unite and track down the offenders one by one. Their quest for truth and justice is very violent, although almost all the violence occurs off screen, and often we are unsure of the victims fate. The movie was shot in black and white and the music is old Soviet movie music, so it is hard to determine when the events are happening – around World War II or maybe even today. Hence it could be interpreted as attack on modern capitalism in Russia.

To clarify about the violence. An oil company and bureaucrats connive to steel ownership of farming village, 1 got dunked in ice water and talked, 2nd got beat and talked when his kids were put on the oven, 3rd talked after being bit in the dark but died from fear afterwards, 4th was stabbed and strangled then burned to death with two of his bodyguards as the entire oil company building burnt to the ground with all the oil land certificates.

== See also ==
- List of recent films in black-and-white

== External links and references ==
- The Outskirts at IMDb
- 2004 review of The Outskirts by New York film critic Louis Proyect
