= On Seven Winds =

- Russian: На семи ветрах
- Directed by: Stanislav Rostotsky
- Written by: Aleksandr Galich; Stanislav Rostotskiy
- Starring: Larisa Luzhina; Sofiya Pilyavskaya; Vyacheslav Tikhonov; Klara Luchko; Vladimir Zamanskiy
- Cinematography: Vyacheslav Shumskiy
- Edited by: Valentina Mironova
- Music by: Kirill Molchanov
- Release date: 1962
- Running time: 106 minute
- Country: Soviet Union
- Language: Russian

On Seven Winds (Russian: На семи ветрах) is a 1962 Soviet World War II film directed by Stanislav Rostotsky.

== Plot ==
The film tells about a girl named Svetlana who goes to a provincial town to meet her fiance, but the war with Nazi Germany starts and they did not meet and Svetlana decided to wait for him in his apartment, in a house on the outskirts, "on seven winds". When the Nazis approached the city, the new home of Svetlana houses a frontline newspaper, later it became a hospital, still later converted into a frontline military base. Svetlana patiently stays there. Eventually a doorbell rings...

== Cast ==
- Larisa Luzhina as Svetlana Ivashova
- Sofya Pilyavskaya
- Vyacheslav Tikhonov as Capt. Suzdalev
- Klara Luchko as Doctor Natalia Guseva
- Vladimir Zamansky
- Vyacheslav Nevinny
- Mikhail Troyanovsky as Waldemar Yanovich Peterson
- Margarita Strunova
