= Yevgeni Urbansky =

Soviet actor

- Евгений Урбанский
- Urbansky in the Ballad of a Soldier (1959)
- Born: 27 February 1932; Moscow, Russian SFSR, Soviet Union
- Died: 4 November 1965 (aged 33); Bukhara Region, Uzbek Soviet Socialist Republic, Soviet Union
- Cause of death: Accident during filming
- Burial place: Novodevichye Cemetery, Moscow
- Education: Moscow Art Theatre School, 1952–1957
- Occupation: Actor
- Years active: 1957–1965
- Political party: Communist Party of the Soviet Union
- Awards: Honored Artist of the RSFSR

Yevgeni Yakovlevich Urbansky (Russian: Евгений Яковлевич Урбанский; 27 February 1932 – 5 November 1965) was a prominent Soviet Russian actor.

The creative life of Urbansky was short but very notable. A whole cinema epoch with peculiar aesthetics was created by him in the films The Communist (1958), Ballad of a Soldier (1959), and Clear Skies (1961). At the age of thirty-three, the actor died in an accident while performing a stunt during filming.

== Selected filmography ==
- The Communist (1957)
- Ballad of a Soldier (1959)
- Letter Never Sent (1960)
- Probation (1960)
- Clear Skies (1961)
- The Boy and the Dove (1961)
- The Big Ore (1964)
- A Span of Earth (1964)
