= The Fourth Height =

- Russian: Четвёртая высота
- Directed by: Igor Voznesensky
- Written by: Elena Ilyina; Valentina Spirina
- Starring: Margarita Sergeyecheva; Olga Ageyeva; Larisa Luzhina; Vladimir Puchkov; Pavel Rudenskiy
- Cinematography: Aleksandr Rybin
- Edited by: Galina Dmitriyeva
- Music by: Yevgeny Krylatov
- Release date: 1977
- Country: Soviet Union
- Language: Russian

The Fourth Height (Russian: Четвёртая высота) is a 1977 Soviet biographical drama film directed by Igor Voznesensky.

== Plot ==
The film tells about the famous Soviet film actress, who in May 1942 voluntarily went to the front.

== Cast ==
- Margarita Sergeyecheva
- Olga Ageyeva
- Larisa Luzhina
- Vladimir Puchkov
- Pavel Rudenskiy
- Vladimir Kotov
- Misha Shcherbakov
- Sergey Obrazov
- Yelena Berman
- Marina Gorlova
