= Allegro Con Brio (film) =

1979 drama film

- Directed by: Vladimir Strelkov
- Starring: Vladimir Zamansky
- Production company: Odessa Film Studio
- Release date: 1979
- Country: Soviet Union
- Language: Russian

Allegro Con Brio (Russian: «Аллегро с огнём», romanized: Allegro s ognyom, lit. 'Allegro with fire') is a 1979 Soviet World War II drama about a unit of Soviet military specialists working to discover the secrets of Nazi naval mines.

== Plot ==
In June 1941, at the onset of World War II, the German forces, aiming to block the Soviet Black Sea Fleet, deploy deep-sea mines in port waters that evade traditional sweeping methods, effectively immobilizing the fleet. To counter this, a special team is tasked with disarming the mines. Their first attempt ends tragically as the mine detonates during retrieval, destroying the pontoon and revealing a hydrometer mechanism triggering the blast. The team then successfully disables a second mine underwater, but onshore, as the group leader Ivanov dismantles it, a relay activates, causing an explosion and killing him. Lieutenant Ukhov proposes bombarding the channel with depth charges, discovering that paired bombs prompt detonation. This tactic initiates a partial clearing of the mined waters, but soon a crane explodes in what was thought to be a cleared path, indicating the need for further measures.

Command now decides to retrieve a third mine, assigning Boris Rashevsky to examine it. He identifies it as a magnetic mine designed to detonate after a set number of ships pass, not the first, a suspicion later confirmed when a destroyer is destroyed overnight. Rashevsky and Tverdokhlib approach the mine, spotting a hydrophone, but before they can act, an explosion takes their lives. The only remaining team member, inexperienced graduate student Makarin, undergoes accelerated diving training and raises the mine himself. Testing his theory, Makarin discovers the mine responds to medium-speed ship noise. He plays Beethoven's Allegro con brio near the mine, noting a section that matches the ship noise frequency. Despite challenges with the record needle skipping, he finally stabilizes it, triggering a controlled explosion. Severely injured yet alive, Makarin realizes he has found a way to neutralize the mines, ensuring the fleet’s pathway remains open.
