= Goodbye, Boys =

- Russian: До свидания, мальчики!
- Directed by: Mikhail Kalik
- Written by: Boris Balter; Mikhail Kalik
- Starring: Natalya Bogunova; Yevgeny Steblov; Anna Rodionova; Nikolay Dostal; Victoria Fyodorova
- Cinematography: Levan Paatashvili
- Edited by: Lydia Kuznetsova
- Music by: Mikael Tariverdiev
- Production company: Mosfilm
- Release date: 1964
- Country: Soviet Union
- Language: Russian

Goodbye, Boys (Russian: До свидания, мальчики!) is a 1964 Soviet war drama film directed by Mikhail Kalik. The film was based on Boris Balter's short fiction Goodbye, Boys published in 1962.

== Plot ==
The film is a coming-of-age account of three boys who live in a seaside city, constantly looking at people who relax on the beach, talk about friendship, love and life in general, which will soon change dramatically with the onset of World War II.

== Limited release ==
Although the film was made in 1964, it only got a limited release in 1966, before being withdrawn over its perceived "pessimism". The film was not again released until the early 1990s, after the fall of the Soviet Union.

== Cast ==
- Natalya Bogunova as Inna
- Yevgeny Steblov as Volodya Belov (as Ye. Steblov)
- Anna Rodionova as Katya
- Nikolay Dostal as Sashka Krigger
- Victoria Fyodorova as Zhenya
- Mikhail Kononov as Viktor Anikin
- Angelina Stepanova as Nadezhda Belova, Volodya's mother
- Yefim Kopelyan as The Sheet Metal Worker
- Nikolay Grabbe as Political commissar
