= The Seventh Companion =

The Seventh Companion (Седьмой спутник)
- Directed by: Grigori Aronov; Aleksei German
- Written by: Edgar Dubrovsky; Yuri Klepikov
- Starring: Andrei Popov
- Cinematography: Eduard Rozovsky
- Music by: Isaak Shvarts
- Release date: 1967
- Running time: 89 minutes
- Country: Soviet Union
- Language: Russian

The Seventh Companion (Russian: Седьмой спутник, romanized: Sed'moy sputnik) is a 1967 Soviet drama film set in Petrograd in the years following the Russian Revolution. The film marked the directorial debut of Russian director Aleksei German, who co-directed it with Grigori Aronov. The film is based on a novel by Boris Lavrenyov.

== Plot ==
The film is set in 1918, St. Petersburg, Russia. The new government has announced a Red Terror, and now a merciless extermination of "counter-revolutionaries" is underway. Eugene Pavlovich Adamov, general of the royal army and professor at the Military Academy of Law, is arrested and placed in a kind of "room" which is arranged as a prisoner's cell. However, it does not only contain the king's soldiers, officials and aristocrats, but also ordinary criminals. Every day prisoners who are shaking from fear are being taken away for "trial" from the horrible room. And the verdict is almost always the same – execution by the firing squad.

Adamov has no illusions as he quietly waits for death, but suddenly a miracle happens: he is freed. Being an honest and principled man, Adamov in 1905 refused to bring charges against two sailors, who had disobeyed their captain's criminal orders. Now the new government considered this sufficient grounds for release of the old tsarist general. However, Adamov has no place to go: his apartment with numerous rooms has been given to other people a long time ago, and the general has to go back to the place of his recent confinement where he finds a job as a launderer.

Some time later Adamov is offered a job as an investigator and he begins to serve the new government. However, as he investigates the murders of the military confiscation unit ("prodotryad") members, the general is faced with an attempt of lawlessness on the part of the "reds" and resolutely tries to prevent this. Alas, no one listens to Adamov, innocent people are shot without trial, and the general himself falls into the hands of the "whites". Adamov tries to explain to the officer of the detachment his reasons for him going over to the Bolshevik side, but he sees only a traitor in Adamov, and he orders the old law professor to be shot.

== Cast ==
- Andrei Popov – Eugene Pavlovich Adamov, former royal general
- Aleksandr Anisimov – Kuhtin
- Georgiy Shtil – Kimka
- Pyotr Chernov – Zykov
- Valentin Abramov – chairman of the house committee
- Vladimir Osenev – Priklonskiy
- Sofia Giatsintova – Marya Semyonovna, general's wife
- Vladimir Erenberg – Verbovskiy
- Aleksandr Mikhaylov – Muravlev
- Abesalom Loria – Babsky, inventor
- Grigory Shpigel – Shpigel
- Pyotr Kudlay – Kostel-Sviridov
- Georgi Yumatov – Turka
- Anatoli Romashin – white officer
- Aleksey Batalov – commissar
- Aleksey Glazyrin – chairman of the Revolutionary Tribunal
- Liliya Gritsenko – Sonia Priklonskaya
- Panteleymon Krymov – Dmitriy Andreevich
- Yuri Leonidov – colonel
