= Man without a Passport =

- Russian poster
- Russian: Человек без паспорта
- Directed by: Anatoly Bobrovsky
- Written by: Vladimir Kuznetsov
- Starring: Vladimir Zamansky; Nikolai Gritsenko; Alexey Eybozhenko; Vladimir Osenev
- Cinematography: Vladimir Boganov
- Edited by: Valentina Yankovskaya
- Music by: Aleksandr Zatsepin
- Release date: 1966
- Country: Soviet Union
- Language: Russian

Man without a Passport (Russian: Человек без паспорта) is a 1966 Soviet detective film directed by Anatoly Bobrovsky.

== Plot ==
The film tells about the Soviet counterintelligence, trying to find and neutralize the spies who were sent to the USSR in order to obtain secret information about the construction of a large military-industrial complex...

== Cast ==
- Vladimir Zamansky as Aleksandr Ryabich (as V. Zamansky)
- Gennady Frolov as Vladimir Bakhrov (as G. Frolov)
- Nikolai Gritsenko as Pyotr Izmaylov (as N. Gritsenko)
- Lionella Skirda as Olga Goncharova (as L. Skirda)
- Alexey Eybozhenko as Konstantin Lezhnev (as A. Eybozhenko)
- Mikhail Pogorzhelsky as Vasily Fyodorovich Zubarev (as M. Pogorzhelsky)
- Vladimir Osenev as Fyodor Katko (as V. Osenev)
- Konstantin Tyrtov as Semyon Zabluda (as K. Tyrtov)
- Aleksei Sveklo as Oleychenko (as A. Sveklo)
- Viktor Pavlov as Gorokhov (as V. Pavlov)
