= Mikhail Kalik =

Soviet-Israeli film director (1927–2017)

- Михаи́л Ка́лик
- Born: Mikhail Naumovich Kalik; 27 January 1927; Arkhangelsk, Soviet Union
- Died: 31 March 2017 (aged 90); Jerusalem, Israel
- Occupation: Film director

Mikhail Naumovich Kalik (Russian: Михаи́л Нау́мович Ка́лик; 27 January 1927 – 31 March 2017) was a Soviet and Israeli film director and screenwriter.

== Life and career ==
A descendant of a prominent Kyiv Jewish family, Mikhail Kalik grew up in the heart of Moscow. As a teenager, he spent the war in the evacuation in Central Asia. In 1949, he was accepted into the Moscow Film School (VGIK) where he studied under Grigori Alexandrov. In 1951, during the anti-cosmopolitan campaign under Stalin, he was arrested with several other students and accused of Jewish bourgeois nationalism and planning anti-Soviet terrorist acts. A sentence of ten years detention was pronounced against him. He was sent to Lefortovo Prison, then to Ozerlag labor camp near Taishet and later to other GULAG sites. He was released and rehabilitated in the era of de-Stalinization. He came back to VGIK in 1954 under the direction of Sergei Yutkevich and graduated in 1958. His first film was Ataman Codr codirected with Boris Rytsarev in 1958. His best known film is Man Follows Sun (1961), about a young boy who in one day experiences numerous facets of live, in his pursuit to see the sun.

He emigrated to Israel in 1971. Because of the disastrous critical response he did not make a single feature film there after his first Israeli film Three and One in 1974. Encouraged by Soviet film authorities he directed the autobiographical film And the Wind Returneth in 1991.

He died on 31 March 2017, after a serious illness. He is buried in Jerusalem.

== Filmography ==
- 1958 – Ataman Codr (Атаман Кодр)
- 1958 – The Youth of Our Fathers (Юность наших отцов)
- 1959 – Lullabye (Колыбельная)
- 1961 – Man Follows the Sun (Человек идёт за солнцем)
- 1964 – Goodbye, Boys! (До свидания, мальчики)
- 1968 – To Love (Любить…)
- 1969 – The Price (Цена), TV
- 1974 – Three and One
- 1991 – And the Wind Returneth (И возвращается ветер...)
