= Goaway and Twobriefcases =

- Russian: Кыш и Двапортфеля
- Directed by: Eduard Gavrilov
- Written by: Yuz Aleshkovsky
- Starring: Andrei Kondratyev; Ekaterina Kuznetsova; Leonid Kuravlyov; Larisa Luzhina; Vladimir Zamanskiy
- Cinematography: Georgy Kupriyanov
- Edited by: Lidiya Milioti
- Music by: Yan Frenkel
- Release date: 1974
- Country: Soviet Union
- Language: Russian

Goaway and Twobriefcases (Russian: Кыш и Двапортфеля) is a 1974 Soviet children's comedy film directed by Eduard Gavrilov.

== Plot ==
The film centers on two schoolchildren, whom classmates call Two briefcases because of their small stature, and a puppy named Goaway, who needs protection and education.

== Cast ==
- Andrei Kondratyev as Alyosha Seroglazov
- Ekaterina Kuznetsova as Snezhana Sokolova
- Leonid Kuravlyov as Dmitriy Eduardovich
- Larisa Luzhina as Irina Dmitriyevna
- Vladimir Zamanskiy as Pal Palych (as V. Zamanskiy)
- Lyudmila Gladunko as Veta Pavlovna (as L. Gladunko)
- Aleksei Yegorin as Misha Lvov (as Alyosha Yegorin)
- Arkadi Markin as Yura Gusev
- Nastya Nitochkina as Nastya Akulova
- Lena Kozhakina as Olya Blinova
