= Clear Skies (film) =

1961 film

- Film poster
- Directed by: Grigori Chukhrai
- Written by: Daniil Khrabrovitsky
- Produced by: Vladimir Kantorovich
- Starring: Yevgeni Urbansky
- Cinematography: Sergei Poluyanov
- Edited by: Maria Timofeeva
- Music by: Mikhail Ziv
- Production company: Mosfilm
- Release date: 20 May 1961
- Running time: 110 minutes
- Country: Soviet Union
- Language: Russian

Clear Skies (Russian: Чистое небо, romanized: Chistoe nebo) is a 1961 Soviet war romance film directed by Grigori Chukhrai. It won the Grand Prix (in a tie with Kaneto Shindo's The Naked Island) at the 2nd Moscow International Film Festival.

== Plot ==
The film takes place in the USSR during the 1940s and the 1950s. During the war pilot Alexey Astakhov fights, gets captured and then manages to escape. In peacetime Alexey is treated with distrust and suspicion - he is a soldier who had been in captivity and thereby has "stained the moral character of the Soviet pilot." Alexey suffers, can not find work in his field nor a place in life. Sasha Lvova's love which she has carried through the war and the difficulties of the postwar period saves him. After the death of Stalin, Astakhov is called to the Ministry of Defense, where his military award is returned. Alexey returns to the squadron and tests planes.

== Cast ==
- Yevgeni Urbansky as Aleksei Astakhov
- Nina Drobysheva as Sasha Lvova
- Natalya Kuzmina as Lyusya
- Vitali Konyayev as Petya
- Georgi Kulikov as Mitya
- Leonid Knyazev as Ivan Ilyich
- Georgi Georgiu as Nikolai Avdeyevich
- Oleg Tabakov as Seryozhka
- Alik Krylov as Sergey
- Vitali Bondarev as Yegorka
