= The Beginning of the Legend =

- Russian: Так начиналась легенда
- Directed by: Boris Grigoryev
- Written by: Yuri Nagibin
- Starring: Larisa Luzhina; Georgiy Burkov; Oleg Orlov; Svetlana Ponomaryova; Mayya Bulgakova
- Cinematography: Konstantin Arutyunov
- Music by: Georgy Dmitriev
- Release date: 1976
- Country: Soviet Union
- Language: Russian

The Beginning of the Legend (Russian: Так начиналась легенда) is a 1976 Soviet biographical drama film directed by Boris Grigoryev.

== Plot ==
The film tells about the childhood of Yuri Gagarin, which took place against the backdrop of war, occupation, famine, the expulsion of the elder brother and sister to Germany, the expulsion of the Nazis from the Smolensk region and the transfer of his family to Gzhatsk.

== Cast ==
- Larisa Luzhina as Anna Timofeyevna Gagarina
- Georgiy Burkov as Aleksei Ivanovich Gagarin
- Oleg Orlov as Yuri Alekseievich Gagarin
- Svetlana Ponomaryova as Nastya (as Sveta Ponomaryova)
- Mayya Bulgakova as Ksenia Gerasimovna
- Vilnis Bekeris as Albert
- Boris Grigorev as Dronov
- Vera Altayskaya
- Yury Grigorev
- Vladimir Gusev as Pilot
