= Man Follows the Sun =

Man Follows the Sun (Человек идёт за солнцем)
- Film poster
- Directed by: Mikhail Kalik
- Written by: Valeriu Gagiu; Mikhail Kalik
- Starring: Nika Krimnus
- Cinematography: Vadim Derbenyov
- Edited by: Ksenia Blinova; Nikolay Chaika
- Music by: Mikael Tariverdiev
- Production company: Moldova-Film
- Release date: 1962
- Running time: 72 minutes
- Country: Soviet Union
- Language: Russian

Man Follows the Sun (Russian: Человек идёт за солнцем, translit. Chelovek idyot za solntsem) is a 1962 Soviet drama film directed by Mikhail Kalik.

The film follows a little boy through the megacity (Chișinău) on his pursuit to get the sun, because, as another boy tells him that going straight he will be able to get the sun, walk around the globe, and return to the place of his departure but from a different side. The world of adults and the spaces they inhabit are viewed from a child's perspective.

== Plot ==
The story follows a single day in the life of a child, filled with an extraordinary range of experiences as seen through a child's eyes.

Inspired by the idea that one could walk around the Earth by following the sun and return to the same spot, Sanda sets out to test this theory. Along the way, he encounters various people and events: a lottery ticket seller, a scientist from the Institute of the Sun, a teenager with a magnifying glass, joyful fathers outside a maternity hospital, a girl with colorful balloons rushing to a date, a bustling market where a boy shares a ripe watermelon, a stunt motorcyclist performing a death-defying trick, a hero who turns out to be a timid ceramic collector fearing his domineering wife, a truck driver opposed to his sister's dates with strangers, construction workers who kindly share lunch with him, a policeman scolding him for his independence ("today you're chasing the sun, tomorrow you'll be scalping movie tickets"), a girl watering sunflowers and her boss who orders them uprooted, a shoeshiner who lost his legs in the war, a boy blowing soap bubbles, a funeral procession, golden fish in a city fountain, a sunset, an evening café, and a lullaby song.

At the end of his exhausting day, a passing military musician picks up the tired boy, listens attentively to his account of the endless day and unique adventure, and walks him home.

== Cast ==
- Nika Krimnus as Sandu
- Yevgeniy Yevstigneyev as Nikolai Chernykh, motorcycle racer
- Tatyana Bestayeva as Elya, motorcycle racer's wife
- Anatoli Papanov as manager
- Nikolay Volkov as lottery tickets seller
- Georgiy Georgiu as Koka, hairdresser
- Valentin Zubkov as military musician
- Lev Kruglyy as truck driver
- Valentina Telegina as woman reading a letter
- Larisa Luzhina as Lenutsa
- Dumitru Fusu as Rike, inspector of Militsiya
- Maxim Grecov as Lev the shoeshiner
- Viktor Markin as happy father
- Georgios Sovchis as Prince of Orange, construction worker
- Georgiy Svetlani as fan de foot
- Iosif Levyanu as taxi driver

== Reception ==
Administrative measures were taken against Mikhail Kalik because his film contained a brief erotic scene. In an interview with Patrick Bureau, Andrei Tarkovsky described Man Follows the Sun as an example of "poetic cinema", alongside Ballad of a Soldier and The Red Balloon. He also associated his own work with this kind of cinema, characterized by films that do not strictly follow conventional narrative development or logical connections.
