= Grigori Aronov =

Soviet film director, actor, and screenwriter

Grigori (Geliy) Lazarevich Aronov (Russian: Григо́рий (Ге́лий) Ла́заревич Аро́нов; born 1 January 1923 in Pochep; died 1 July 1984 in Pochep) was a Soviet film director, actor, and screenwriter. He co-directed The Seventh Companion, also the debut of Aleksei Yuryevich German.
