= To Love (1968 film) =

1968 Soviet Union film

- Russian: Любить...
- Directed by: Mikhail Kalik; Inna Tumanyan
- Written by: Mikhail Kalik
- Produced by: M. Shcherbak
- Starring: Mihail Badiceanu; Natalya Chetverikova; Alexey Eybozhenko; Alisa Freyndlikh; Igor Kvasha
- Cinematography: Arkadi Koltsaty; Dmitry Motornyy
- Edited by: Zhanna Dubchak; N. Kuptsova
- Music by: Mikael Tariverdiev
- Production company: Gorky Film Studio
- Release date: 1968
- Running time: 73 min.
- Country: Soviet Union
- Language: Russian

To Love (Russian: Любить..., romanized: Lyubit...) is a 1968 Soviet romantic drama film directed by Mikhail Kalik and Inna Tumanyan.

The film consists of four short stories, each of which asks the audience a question: "What is love?"

== Plot ==
=== First Story ===
On a rainy day, three couples dance and chat in an apartment to the sound of a tape recording. A solitary young man sits nearby with a book, pondering aloud. Suddenly, the music ends, and a recorded conversation between a man and a woman begins playing. The woman confesses her love for the man, and the young people listen attentively.

=== Second Story ===
On a winter evening, a young man named Sergey bids farewell to a girl and, in high spirits, walks through snow-covered Leningrad. At the Bronze Horseman statue, he imagines the snowstorm personified as a girl and invites her to dance. Later, he boards a tram and notices a crying conductress. Sergey tries to comfort her and walks her home. The girl, Anya, shares her heartbreak over being abandoned by her lover, who pressured her into having an abortion. Sergey smashes the man’s portrait and convinces Anya to move on with her life.

=== Third Story ===
At a train station, a man and a woman say goodbye. The man tries to persuade the woman to stay in Moscow for a few more days and speaks of meeting again in the North, where the woman is headed. They take a taxi in search of a hotel, but all are fully booked. Left with no options, they wander through the city, find shelter in a building entrance, but are evicted by a janitor. They head to the countryside, drink wine, and realize there is nowhere private for them to be together. By morning, they return to the train station. The woman boards her train, and they do not arrange another meeting. The man walks away, and the woman watches him leave.

=== Fourth Story ===
In a Moldavian village, a young man named Mircha returns home late at night with a cart of hay. Along the way, he encounters a girl, Nutsa, who has been waiting for him and whom he also likes. They spend the night together, and in the morning, they head back to the village. Upon arriving at Mircha's home, his father notices a girl hiding in the hay. Embarrassed, Mircha announces to his parents that she is their daughter-in-law. The story concludes with scenes of a traditional Moldavian wedding.

== Cast ==
- Mihail Badiceanu as Moraru
- Natalya Chetverikova as Vera
- Alexey Eybozhenko as guy at the party
- Alisa Freyndlikh as Anna
- Valentin Nikulin as lonely guest
- Yekaterina Vasilyeva as Igor's girlfriend
- Anastasia Voznesenskaya as girl with a globe
- Naum Kavunovsky as hotel manager
- Svetlana Svetlichnaya as northerner
- Igor Kvasha as Igor
- Andrei Mironov as guy at the party
- Alexander Men as cameo
