= Trial on the Road =

- Directed by: Aleksei German
- Written by: Yuri German
- Screenplay by: Eduard Volodarsky
- Starring: Rolan Bykov; Anatoly Solonitsyn; Vladimir Zamansky
- Cinematography: Yakov Sklansky
- Distributed by: Lenfilm
- Release date: 1986
- Running time: 96 min
- Country: Soviet Union
- Language: Russian

Trial on the Road (Russian: Проверка на дорогах, romanized: Proverka na dorogakh) is a 1986 Soviet war film, directed by Aleksei German, starring Rolan Bykov, Anatoly Solonitsyn, and Vladimir Zamansky. It is also known as Checkpoint or Check up on the Road.

Shot in 1971, Trial on the Road was denied release in the Soviet Union for 15 years after its production due to its controversial depiction of the Soviet partisans. The film is based on a short story by the director's father, Yuri German, titled Operation "Happy New Year!". The screenplay was written by Eduard Volodarsky.

== Plot ==
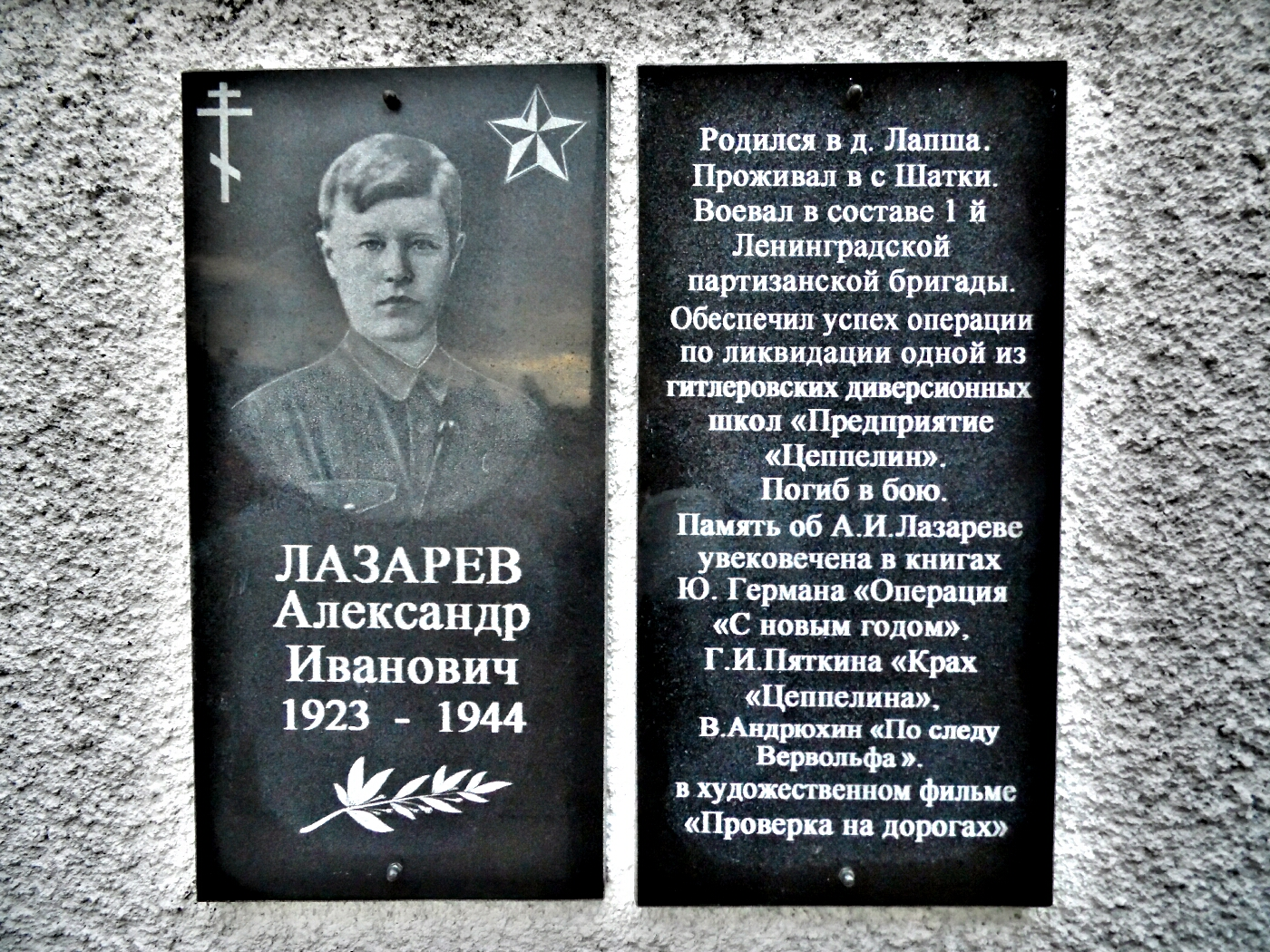
A memorial plaque to Alexander Lazarev. It mentions several Lazarev's depictions in literature and film

The film takes place in December 1942 during Operation Barbarossa. A partisan detachment, commanded by former village police officer Ivan Lokotkov, operates behind German lines. Former Red Army sergeant Alexander Lazarev, who had previously been captured by the Germans and collaborated with them, is captured by the partisans and volunteers to defect back to them.

The detachment is on the run from the German forces and is running out of food, so the command decides to undertake a risky operation to seize a food train at a railway depot guarded by the Nazis. Though they still do not trust Lazarev, they assign him to lead a group of partisans disguised as German soldiers to infiltrate the depot, as the German garrison recognizes Lazarev and does not know about his defection.

While carrying out the mission, Lazarev sees an acquaintance, a fellow Russian collaborator, on a machine-gun tower and distracts him while the partisans move toward the train. However, one of the collaborators recognizes the partisans and raises the alarm. The partisans move quickly to hijack the train, while Lazarev, from the tower, provides covering fire with the machine-gun. Mortally wounded, Lazarev climbs down from the tower and tries to catch the train, collapsing before he could reach it.

== Cast ==
- Rolan Bykov as Ivan Egorovich Lokotkov
- Anatoly Solonitsyn as Igor Leonidovich Petushkov
- Vladimir Zamansky as Alexander Ivanovich Lazarev
- Oleg Borisov as Victor Mikhailovich Solomin
- Fyodor Odinokov as The Old Mine-Layer - Erofeich
- Anda Zaice as Inga, the partisan-interpreter
- Gennadi Dyudyayev as Dmitry, a young partisan
- Maya Bulgakova as a peasant woman
- Nikolai Burlyayev as young auxiliary policeman
- Victor Pavlov as Kutenko, an auxiliary police watchman
- Yuriy Dubrovin as Gennady Bolshakov
- Pyotr Kolbasin as episode

== Release history ==
Trial on the Road was shot in 1971, but was banned for 15 years. It was "shelved" for the film's theme: it was harshly criticized for "deheroization of partisan movement" and for sympathy to a traitor, or collaborator with Nazi forces, but who becomes a hero in fighting against the Germans on the Soviets' side. This "anti-heroic" depiction of Soviet history shows that distinctions like "traitor" and "hero" cease to have any real meaning, according to Alexei German's humane portrait of wartime. The film was released in 1986, during "perestroika" in the Soviet Union.

== Historicity ==
The film was based on real events: partisans used to stop a truck full of "politsais" (police made of local collaborators) or Vlasovites and shoot them all after a brief trial, leaving one to tell the story. Lazarev's character is based on a real person as well, but his real-life role was to penetrate Vlasov detachments to convince Vlasovites to give themselves up. In the film, Lazarev voluntarily gives himself up to partisans, and two partisan leaders (of antipodal characters), Commander Lokotkov and Commissar Petushkov, put the collaborator to the test.

== Awards ==
- 1988: USSR State Prize
- A number of film prizes
