= Anda Zaice =

Latvian actress (1941–2026)

- Born: 11 June 1941
- Died: 23 January 2026 (aged 84)
- Occupation: Actress

Anda Zaice (11 June 1941 – 23 January 2026) was a Latvian actress. She appeared in films such as Alyonka (1961), The First Trolleybus (1963) and Trial on the Road (1971). In 1977, Zaice was awarded the honorary title of Merited Stage Artist of the Latvian SSR.

== Life and career ==
Zaice graduated from the Daile Theatre Studio in 1962. From 1962 to 1964, she was an actress at the Liepāja Theatre. From 1964 to 1992, she was a leading actress at the Riga Youth Theater.

Zaice died on 23 January 2026, at the age of 84.
