= Vladimir Osenev =

Soviet actor (1908–1977)

- Born: 8 September 1908; Moscow, Moscow Governorate, Russian Empire
- Died: 1 April 1977 (aged 68); Moscow, Russian SFSR, Soviet Union
- Occupations: Stage, film and voice actor
- Years active: 1933–1977

Vladimir Ivanovich Osenev (Russian: Владимир Иванович Осенев; 8 September 1908 – 1 April 1977) was a Soviet stage, film and voice actor. After graduating from Vakhtangov Theatre in the 1930s he had a stage career spanning four decades. Yet he was more noticed by his occasional appearances in films and animation series, such as the award-winning Winnie-the-Pooh trilogy. He also played in The Brothers Karamazov, which was nominated for the Academy Award for Best Foreign Language Film in 1969. Osenev was made an Honored Artist of Russia in 1956 and People's Artist of Russia in 1969.

Osenev considered himself a serious actor and first despised the "childish" text of the narrator in Winnie-the-Pooh, but changed his attitude after seeing the final result.

== Filmography ==
- Boule de Suif (1934) as German soldier (uncredited)
- The Great Glinka (1946) as episode (uncredited)
- Admiral Ushakov (1953) as city dweller (uncredited)
- Man without a Passport (1966) as Fyodor Katko
- Major Whirlwind (1967, TV Series) as Krauch
- The Seventh Companion (1968) as Priklonsky
- The Shield and the Sword (1968, TV Mini-Series) as Hitler
- The Brothers Karamazov (1969) as judge
- Subject for a Short Story (1969) as Kurbatov
- Winnie-the-Pooh (1969, Short) as Narrator (voice)
- The Flight (1971) as Tikhiy
- Winnie-the-Pooh Pays a Visit (1971, Short) as Narrator (voice)
- Winnie-the-Pooh and a Busy Day (1972, Short) as Narrator (voice)
- Diamonds for the Dictatorship of the Proletariat (1975) as Stopansky
- Agony (1981) as Shturmer (final film role)
