= Larisa Luzhina =

Soviet and Russian actress

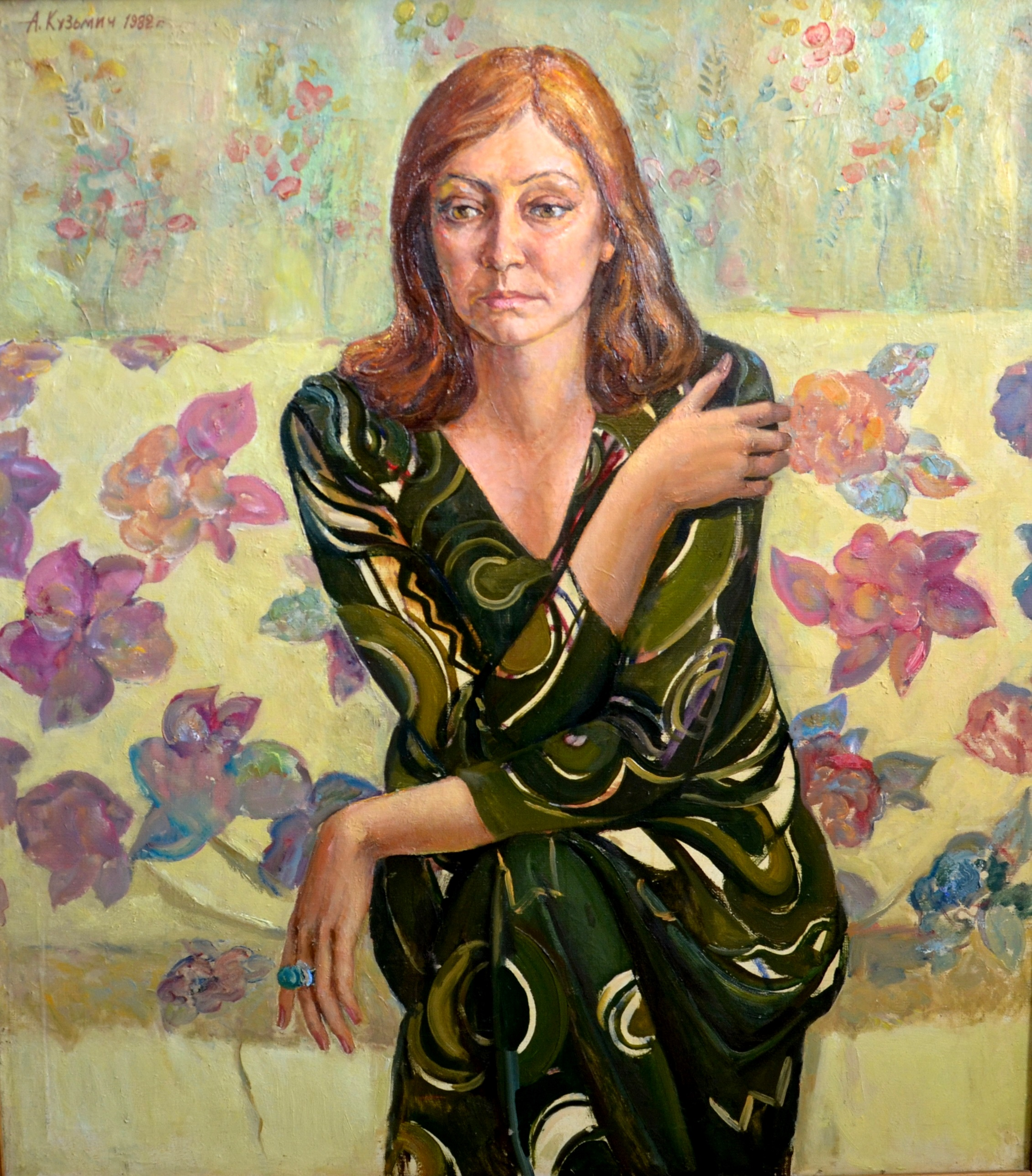
- Portrait by Alexey Kuzmich, 1988
- Born: 4 March 1939 (age 87); Leningrad, Russian SFSR, Soviet Union
- Occupation: Actress
- Years active: 1959–present
- Children: Pavel Shuvalov
- Parent(s): Anatoly Ivanovich Luzhin, Evgenia Adolfovna Luzhina
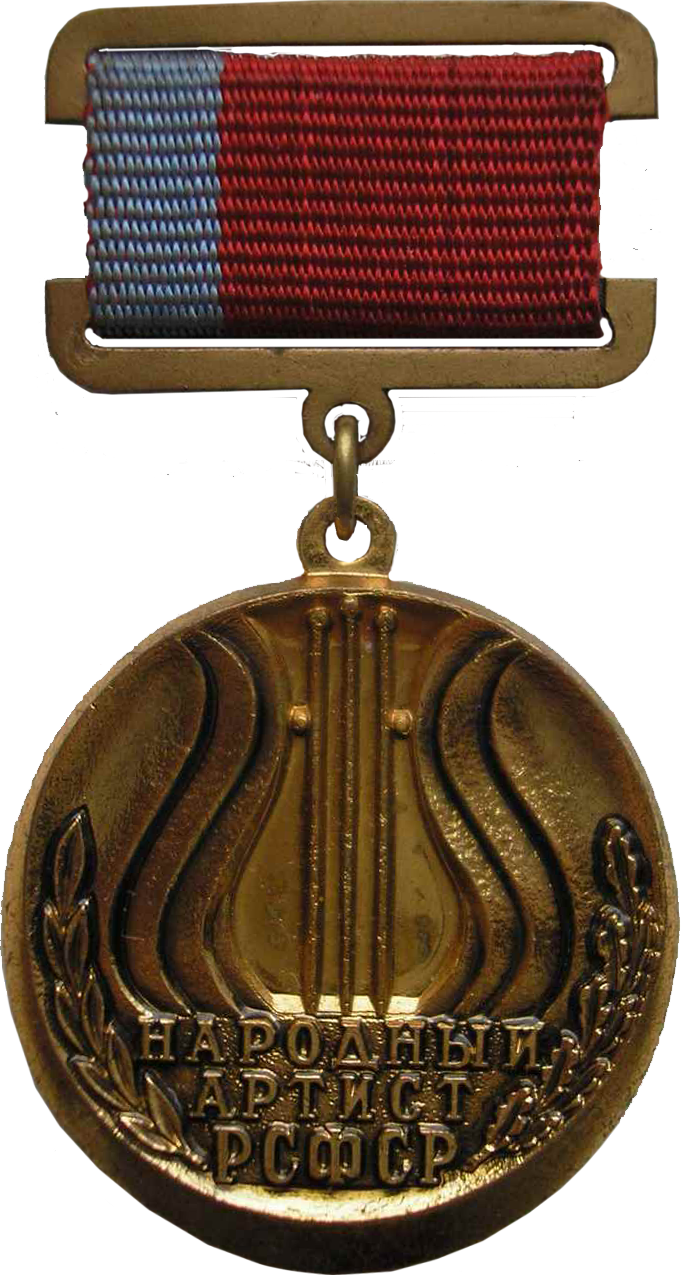
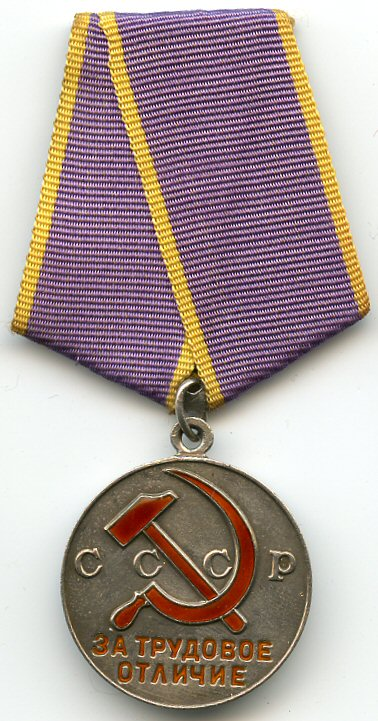
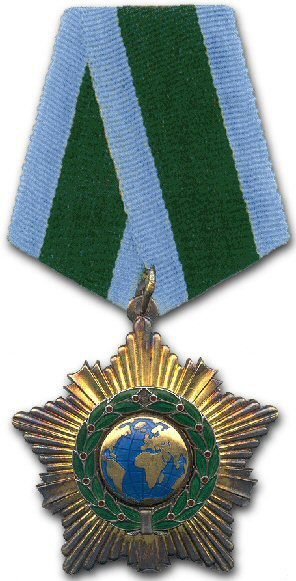
- Awards

Larisa Anatolievna Luzhina (Russian: Лари́са Анато́льевна Лу́жина; born 4 March 1939) is a Soviet and Russian actress. People's Artist of the RSFSR. In 2021, the actress revealed that when she was 19, she was harassed at work. The assistant director of the film molested her and offered to sleep with him: "spend the night with me and this will be your role". She said this information after another actress Elena Proklova said about harassment at work.

== Filmography ==
- 1959 — Wedding Crashers
- 1961 — Man Goes for the Sun
- 1962 — In the Seven Winds
- 1962 — Man Follows the Sun
- 1963 — Silence
- 1963 — A Free Kick
- 1964 — The Big Ore
- 1965 — Dr. Shlyutter
- 1966 — Vertical
- 1969 — Love of Serafim Frolov
- 1969 — Home of the Gentry
- 1969 — Gold
- 1972 — Racers
- 1973 — The Life on This Sinful Earth
- 1973 — Wishes
- 1974 — Conscience
- 1974 — Goaway and Twobriefcases
- 1976 — Jarosław Dąbrowski
- 1976 — The Beginning of the Legend
- 1977 — Fourth Height
- 1978 — Meeting At the End of Winter
- 1978 — Rasmus-Tramp
- 1979 — Do Not Part With Your Beloved
- 1983 — Pleads Guilty
- 1985 — Warning! All Posts...
- 1986 — Secrets of madam Wong
- 1992 — Tractor Drivers 2
- 1992 — The Price of Treasures
- 2000 — House for the Rich
- 2001–2003 — Secrets of Palace Revolutions
- 2005 — Case of Kukotskiy
- 2005 — Hunting for Red Deer
- 2006 — Love is Like Love
- 2007 — The Return of Turetsky
- 2012 — Hunting for Gauleiter
- 2014 — If You're Not With Me
