= Who will pay for Luck? =

- Russian: Кто заплатит за удачу
- Directed by: Konstantin Khudyakov
- Written by: Pavel Chukhray
- Starring: Aleksandr Filippenko; Vitali Solomin; Leonid Filatov; Natalya Danilova; Oleg Afanasyev
- Cinematography: Valeriy Shuvalov
- Edited by: Galina Patrikeyeva
- Music by: Vyacheslav Ganelin
- Release date: 1980
- Country: Soviet Union
- Language: Russian

Who will pay for Luck (Russian: Кто заплатит за удачу) is a 1980 Soviet action adventure film directed by Konstantin Khudyakov. During the Russian Civil War, three men—each believing a captured woman to be a loved one—unite to orchestrate her daring rescue, only to find out she is a stranger, leading to a tragic yet heroic end.

== Plot ==
The film is set in Crimea during the Russian Civil War. In a city controlled by the White Army, an attempted assassination on counterintelligence investigator Konkov fails, leading to the arrest of a Red Army underground operative, Antonina Chumak, who is now facing trial. Fedor Chumak, a local card shark, hears about the arrest and, assuming the prisoner is his sister, decides to save her. Word of Antonina's capture also reaches White Army Cossack Dmitry Chumak, who likewise believes the detainee to be his sister, and Red Navy sailor Sergey Kuskov, who assumes she is his beloved. Both Dmitry and Sergey head to the city to join in her rescue.

Initially, each of the three men tries to act independently, but eventually, they join forces and manage to free Antonina. However, upon rescuing her, they discover that she is a stranger to all three of them. In the end, each of the three rescuers loses his life, while the woman successfully escapes to safety.

== Cast ==
- Aleksandr Filippenko
- Vitali Solomin
- Leonid Filatov
- Natalya Danilova
- Oleg Afanasyev
- Vasiliy Bochkaryov
- Mikhail Chigaryov
- V. Danilin
- Yuriy Dubrovin
- Aleksandr Galibin
