= Aleksei Yuryevich German =

Russian film director and screenwriter

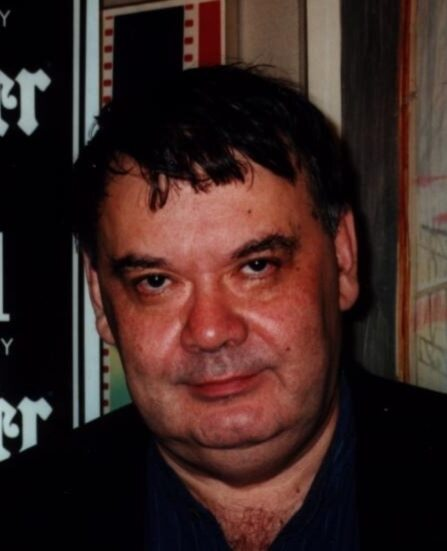
- Born: Aleksei Yuryevich German; 20 July 1938; Leningrad, Russian SFSR, Soviet Union
- Died: 21 February 2013 (aged 74); Saint Petersburg, Russia
- Occupations: Film director, screenwriter, actor
- Spouse: Svetlana Karmalita
- Children: Aleksei German Jr.

Aleksei Yuryevich German (Russian: Алексей Юрьевич Герман, IPA: [ɐlʲɪkˈsʲej ˈjʉrʲjɪvʲɪdʑ ˈɡʲermən]; 20 July 1938 – 21 February 2013) was a Russian film director, screenwriter and actor. In a career spanning five decades of filmmaking, German completed six feature films, noted for his stark pessimism, long, serpentine sequence shots, black and white cinematography, overbearing sound design and acute observations of Stalinist Russia.

== Biography ==
German was born in Leningrad (current Saint Petersburg) in 1938; his father was the writer Yuri German. He studied under Grigori Kozintsev until 1960, and then moved on to working in theatre before joining the Lenfilm studio as an assistant director. He made his directing debut with The Seventh Companion, co-directed with Grigori Aronov in 1967. Over the course of his career, many of his projects met with production difficulties or official opposition; in 50 years, he managed to complete just six feature films, his final film being the science fiction film Hard to Be a God, completed by his son, Alexei German after his death, debuted at the Rome Film Festival in 2013.

Trial on the Road (1971) is the film that made Alexei German famous. It was banned for fifteen years and was shelved by the Ministry of Culture of the Soviet Union until its release (1986) during the Gorbachev era.

In 1987, at the Rotterdam International Film Festival (Netherlands), Alexei German, as a director, received a KNF Award for his three films, Trial on the Road, Twenty Days Without War, and My Friend Ivan Lapshin.

German was married to the screenwriter Svetlana Karmalita; they had a son, Aleksei Alekseivich German, who is also a film director. German died of heart failure 21 February 2013.

== Style ==
Most of German's films are set during the Joseph Stalin era and the Second World War, and they depict the time period in a critical light. His films, shot mostly in black and white or very muted color, have a distinctive "murky" look and are often described as looking "aged." He was known for his obstinacy as a director, for featuring protagonists who could be categorized neither as heroes nor antiheroes, and for casting actors against type.

== Filmography ==
Year	Title	Director	Writer	Notes
1967	The Seventh Companion	Yes	No	
1976	Twenty Days Without War	Yes	No	
1984	My Friend Ivan Lapshin	Yes	No	
1986	Trial on the Road	Yes	No	Produced in 1971
1998	Khrustalyov, My Car!	Yes	Yes	
2013	Hard to Be a God	Yes	Yes	Original title History of the Arkanar Massacre
