= The Communist (film) =

1957 film directed by Yuli Raizman

- Directed by: Yuli Raizman
- Written by: Yevgeny Gabrilovich
- Starring: Yevgeni Urbansky; Sofia Pavlova
- Cinematography: Yu-Lan Chen; Aleksandr Shelenkov
- Music by: Rodion Shchedrin
- Production company: Mosfilm
- Release date: 3 February 1958 (1957 in USSR)
- Running time: 111 min.
- Country: Soviet Union
- Language: Russian

The Communist (Russian: Коммунист, romanized: Kommunist) is a 1957 Soviet historical romance film directed by Yuli Raizman. The Communist is one of the classic films of Soviet cinema. Praised for its realism and noted for its tinges of propaganda, the story is a vivid portrayal of a young man dedicated to communist ideals who struggles to complete a power plant despite supply shortages, a burgeoning revolution, and war profiteers. The film was innovative for its time; director Yuli Raizman managed to create an unflinching, complex image of the everyday struggles and triumphs of early communism.

== Story ==
In 1919, the Russian Revolution is transitioning into the Russian Civil War. A demobilized Red Army soldier, Vasily Gubanov, travels to a small town to help with the construction of a power plant. The town, Zagory, is in the midst of a housing shortage and Gubanov is only able to obtain a spot on the dining room floor of a local peasant, Fyodor, and his wife, Anyuta. Gubanov offers to pay in rubles, but due to hyperinflation, the ruble is practically worthless. Fyodor rejects money but agrees to house him in exchange for a large lump of sugar.

The local Bolshevik party canvasses the town for communists. When Gubanov admits to belonging to the party, the Soviet (council) puts him in charge of a warehouse. On the first day of work, Gubanov discovers that the current manager is stealing supplies and selling them for personal profit. Gubanov throws him out of the warehouse and tells him to never return. A shortage of nails inspires Gubanov to travel to Moscow to obtain further supplies. He interrupts a council meeting to plead his case. Lenin himself makes calls on his behalf. After a few failed attempts, nails are at last found.

A year later, the White Army, commanded by Anton Denikin, is advancing towards Moscow. Supplies of all kinds are difficult to find, from rifles and ammunition to firewood, clothing, and food. The townspeople of Zagory are hungry. A train from Moscow containing flour is sent to relieve their hunger, but it has not reached the town. The soviet council is determined to finish the power plant and provide for the townspeople. They assign various members to complete different tasks. One is put in charge of re-establishing communications with Moscow, three are sent to look for grain in the surrounding communities, and Gubanov is sent to find the train and bring the carloads of flour to Zagory.

Gubanov follows the train tracks until he discovers that the train is not running due to lack of fuel. Though still the middle of the night, he begins chopping surrounding trees into firewood. In the morning, the train's crew joins him. They chop enough firewood to make it to Zagory, but as the train approaches the town, bandits set fire to the town's barracks and attack the train to steal the flour. Gubanov tries to stop them. In the ensuing fistfight, he is shot and killed.

== Cast ==
- Yevgeni Urbansky as Vasily Gubanov
- Sofia Pavlova as Anyuta Fokina
- Boris Smirnov as Vladimir Lenin
- Yevgeny Shutov as Fyodor Fokin
- Sergei Yakovlev as Denis Ivanovich
- Valentin Zubkov as Stepan
- Viktor Kolpakov as defrocked priest
- Vladimir Adlerov as Zimny
- Ivan Kashirin as locomotive driver
- Arkady Smirnov as Khramchenko
- Leonid Yengibarov as bandit
