= Anatoly Shchukin =

Soviet actor (1916–1983)

- Born: 7 December 1916; Moscow, Russian Empire
- Died: 29 May 1983 (aged 66); Moscow, Soviet Union
- Occupation: Actor
- Years active: 1938–1982

Anatoly Mikhailovich Shchukin (Russian: Анатолий Михайлович Щукин; 7 December 1916 – 29 May 1983) was a Soviet stage and voice actor. After graduating from a stage school of Boris Shchukin (no relations to him), between 1938 and 1941 he worked at the Vakhtangov Theatre. During World War II he performed with the Soviet Navy Theatre, and in 1946–1948 with the Mossovet Theatre. He spent the rest of his career at the Central Youth Theatre in Moscow, occasionally providing his voice for animations, such as the award-winning Winnie-the-Pooh Pays a Visit. In 1976 he was made an Honored Artist of the RSFSR.

== Selected filmography ==
- The Wild Swans (1962) as the King (voice)
- Winnie-the-Pooh Pays a Visit (1971) as Rabbit (voice)
