= A Span of Earth =

- Russian: Пядь земли
- Directed by: Andrey Smirnov; Boris Yashin
- Written by: Grigory Baklanov
- Starring: Aleksandr Zbruyev; Elliya Sukhanova; Yevgeni Urbansky; Sergei Kurilov; Mikhail Vorontsov; Aleksandr Titov; Anatoli Golik
- Cinematography: Yuri Skhirtladze
- Music by: Aleksey Muravlyov
- Release date: 1964
- Running time: 78 minute
- Country: Soviet Union
- Language: Russian

A Span of Earth (Russian: Пядь земли) is a 1964 Soviet World War II film directed by Andrey Smirnov and Boris Yashin.

== Plot ==
The film takes place in the summer of 1944. The film tells about a young lieutenant and a battalion commander defending a bridgehead.

== Cast ==
- Aleksandr Zbruyev as Aleksandr Motovilov
- Elliya Sukhanova as Rita Tamashova
- Yevgeni Urbansky as Aleksey Babin
- Sergei Kurilov as Bryl
- Mikhail Vorontsov as Afanasiy Makletsov
- Aleksandr Titov as Shumilin
- Anatoli Golik as Mezentsev
- Viktor Suskin as Sayenko (as V. Suskin)
- Andrey Petrov as Pavchenko (as A. Petrov)
- Oleg Forostenko
