= Lullaby (1959 film) =

- Russian: Колыбельная
- Directed by: Mikhail Kalik
- Written by: Isai Kuznetsov; Avenir Zak
- Starring: Nikolai Timofeyev; Viktoriya Lepko; Lida Pigurenko; Lyubov Rumyantseva; Viktor Chetverikov
- Cinematography: Vadim Derbenyov
- Edited by: Mikhail Kalik
- Music by: David Fedov
- Release date: 1959
- Running time: 95 minute
- Country: Soviet Union
- Language: Russian

Lullaby (Russian: Колыбельная) is a 1959 Soviet drama film directed by Mikhail Kalik.

== Plot ==
The film tells about the pilot Losev, who is sent to look for his daughter, which survived the bombing.

== Cast ==
- Nikolai Timofeyev as Losev
- Viktoriya Lepko as Aurika
- Lida Pigurenko as Aurika as a Little Girl
- Lyubov Rumyantseva as Aurika, the Archivist's Daughter (as Lyubov Chernoval)
- Vitaly Chetverikov as Pavel
- Yury Solovyov as Sgt. Mikheyev
- Shura Kuznetsov as Niku
- Mark Troyanovsky as The Archivist
- Svetlana Svetlichnaya
