= Boris Zakhoder =

Russian poet, translator and children's writer (1918–2000)

- Born: September 9, 1918; Kagul, Bessarabia
- Died: November 7, 2000 (aged 82); Moscow, Russia

Boris Vladimirovich Zakhoder (Russian: Бори́с Влади́мирович Заходе́р; 9 September 1918 — 7 November 2000) was a Russian poet, translator and children's writer. He is best known for his translations of Winnie-the-Pooh, Mary Poppins, Alice's Adventures in Wonderland and other children's classics.

== Biography ==
Boris Zakhoder was born to a Jewish family in Kagul (now Cahul, Moldova) and grew up in Moscow. His father was a lawyer, a graduate of Moscow University, and his grandfather was the first crown rabbi of Nizhny Novgorod. After he graduated from high school in 1935, Zakhoder studied at Moscow Aviation Institute, Moscow and Kazan University until in 1938 he entered Maxim Gorky Literature Institute. His studies were interrupted when he was drafted to Soviet-Finnish War and later to World War II. He then returned to the institute and graduated in 1947. He started publishing poems and fairy tales for the children the same year and became popular as a children's writer. His work on translations of Goethe is much less known.

Zakhoder started publishing translations of children's literature in 1960 with A.A. Milne's Winnie-the-Pooh. His version was also the basis for the Soviet 1969 animated film Winnie-the-Pooh and its sequels. Zakhoder was awarded the Russian State Prize for his work, as well as the Hans Christian Andersen Award. One of his children's books is a collection of stories called "The Hermit and the Rose."

== See also ==
- Agniya Barto
- Korney Chukovsky
- Samuil Marshak
- Sergey Mikhalkov
