= Winnie-the-Pooh (1969 film) =

- Image from the film.
- Directed by: Fyodor Khitruk
- Screenplay by: Boris Zakhoder; Fyodor Khitruk
- Starring: Yevgeny Leonov; Iya Savvina
- Narrated by: Vladimir Osenev
- Music by: Mieczysław Weinberg
- Production company: Soyuzmultfilm
- Release date: 1969
- Running time: 11 minutes
- Country: Soviet Union
- Language: Russian

Winnie-the-Pooh (Russian: Винни-Пух, romanized: Vinni-Pukh, IPA: [ˈvʲinʲːɪ ˈpux]) is a 1969 Soviet animated film by Soyuzmultfilm directed by Fyodor Khitruk. The film is based on chapter one in the book series by A. A. Milne. It is the first part of a trilogy, along with two sequels: Winnie-the-Pooh Pays a Visit (Винни-Пух идёт в гости, 1971) and Winnie-the-Pooh and a Busy Day (Винни-Пух и день забот, 1972).

== Storyline ==
Khitruk studied the original book by Milne first in English and only later in Russian, translated by Boris Zakhoder who became a co-writer of the first two parts of the trilogy. Khitruk had not seen the Disney adaptations while working on his own. He created the prototype drawings of the characters together with Vladimir Zuikov, a fellow animator from Film, Film, Film.

Khitruk followed the original book by A. A. Milne and based his first two parts of the trilogy on the Pooh's love for honey. However, while Milne accentuated the relationships between a boy (Christopher Robin) and his favorite toy Pooh, Khitruk removed Christopher Robin and made Pooh the leading character; his narrator is a "true" narrator who has no relation to the story whatsoever. In all of the films, Pooh is accompanied by his best friend Piglet, who follows his lead and gives him advice. The main reason for the omission of the human Christopher Robin was to give all of the animal characters an equal power dynamic.

Khitruk followed his style and drew all scenes in two dimensions. His animation was relatively simple and slow-paced compared to other Milne adaptations. Instead, Khitruk put much emphasis on the dialogues and timing – every move of his characters and every character line are intended to bring hidden details and irony to viewers of all ages.

== Cast ==
- Vladimir Osenev as the narrator. Osenev was a serious stage actor, who first despised the "childish" text and softened only after seeing the final result. Khitruk cast him because of his timbre and sarcasm.
- Yevgeny Leonov as Winnie-the-Pooh. Khitruk tried several prominent actors without success – he favored Leonov, yet thought that his voice was too low. The sound engineer Georgy Martynyuk found a solution in speeding up his voice records. The same technique was used for Savvina, who voiced Piglet.
- Iya Savvina as Piglet. Having known that Savvina was a big fan of the Winnie-the-Pooh story, Khitruk invited her to review his first draft, and in the process cast her as Piglet. Savvina based her intonation on Bella Akhmadulina.

== Legacy and awards ==
In 1976, Khitruk was awarded the USSR State Prize for the Winnie-the-Pooh trilogy. The animation characters, as designed by Khitruk's team, are featured on the 1988 Soviet and 2012 Russian postal stamps; they are permanently painted on a public streetcar running through the Sokolniki Park, and their sculptures are installed in Ramenki District in Moscow.

When Khitruk visited the Disney Studios, Wolfgang Reitherman, the director of Winnie the Pooh and the Blustery Day that won the 1968 Academy Award for Best Animated Short Film, told him that he liked the Soviet version better than his own.

== See also ==
- Soyuzmultfilm
- Winnie-the-Pooh
- A. A. Milne
- History of Russian animation
