= Iya Savvina =

Soviet actress

- Ия Саввина
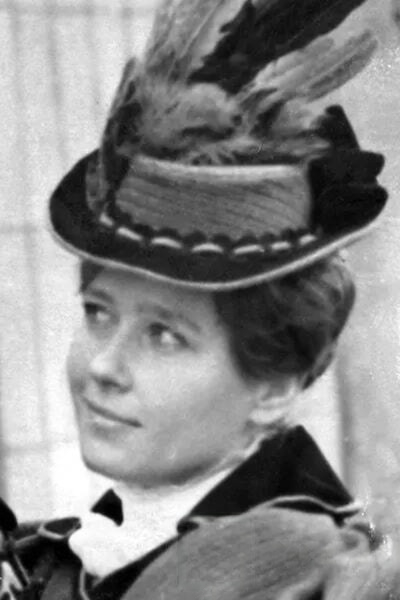
- Savvina in 1968
- Born: 2 March 1936; Voronezh, Russian SFSR, USSR
- Died: 27 August 2011 (aged 75); Moscow, Russia
- Occupation: Actress
- Years active: 1960–2011
- Spouse: Vsevolod Shestakov
- Children: Sergey

Iya Sergeyevna Savvina (Russian: Ия Серге́евна Саввина; 2 March 1936 – 27 August 2011) was a Soviet film actress who was named a People's Artist of the USSR in 1990.

== Biography ==
Savvina was not a professionally trained actress. She graduated from the Department of Journalism of the Moscow State University and has appeared in 30 films following her star turn as Anna Sergeyevna in Iosif Kheifets's The Lady with the Dog (1960). Since 1977, she had served in Moscow Art Theatre. During her career she received many awards including the Crystal Turandot Award and State Prizes of USSR and the Russian SFSR.

Savvina was a notable memoirist and cinema scholar who wrote about her colleagues Faina Ranevskaya, Mikhail Ulyanov, Lyubov Orlova and others. She is also known for providing the voice of the Piglet in the Soviet animation of Winnie-the-Pooh. She was a prominent actress by then, and director Fyodor Khitruk invited her merely to review his initial work, because he knew that Savvina was a big fan of the Winnie-the-Pooh story. The decision to cast her as the Piglet came later, and her records had to be sped up to change the tone of her voice (the same technique was used for the main character). Savvina based her intonation on Bella Akhmadulina.

Savvina was married to Vsevolod Shestakov, a prominent geologist and amateur stage actor. Their son Sergey was born in 1957 with Down syndrome, yet he became a professional graphical artist and Russian-English translator.

== Selected filmography ==
- Gentle (1960) as Gentle Woman
- The Lady with the Dog (1960) as Anna Sergeevna
- They're Calling, Open the Door (1965) as Genka's mother
- The Story of Asya Klyachina (1966) as Asya Klyachina
- Anna Karenina (1967) as Dolly
- Two Comrades Were Serving (1968) as Sasha
- Winnie-the-Pooh (1969, and its 1971 and 1972 sequels), voice of Piglet
- A Lover's Romance (1974) as Tanya's mother
- The Nose (1977) as prostitute
- The Garage (1979) as Lidia Anikeeva
- Tears Were Falling (1982) as Irina Vasina
- Private Life (1982) as Natalia Ilyinichna
- Extend, Extend, Fascination... (1984)
