= List of Soviet films of 1987 =

Title	Russian title	Director	Cast	Genre	Notes
1987
Christians	Христиане	Dmitriy Zolotukhin	Lyubov Polishchuk, Lev Zolotukhin	Drama	
Courier	Курьер	Karen Shakhnazarov	Fyodor Dunayevsky, Anastasiya Nemolyaeva, Oleg Basilashvili, Inna Churikova	Comedy, drama	Entered into the 15th Moscow International Film Festival
Dark Eyes	Очи чёрные	Nikita Mikhalkov	Marcello Mastroianni, Marthe Keller, Yelena Safonova, Pina Cei, Vsevolod Larionov, Innokenti Smoktunovsky	Romance	
Desyat Negrityat	Десять негритят	Stanislav Govorukhin	Vladimir Zeldin, Tatyana Drubich, Alexander Kaidanovsky, Aleksei Zharkov	Crime	
The End of Eternity	Конец Вечности	Andrei Yermash	Oleg Vavilov, Gediminas Girdvainis	Science fiction	
The Extraordinary Adventures of Karik and Valya	Необыкновенные приключения Карика и Вали	Valeri Rodchenko	Anna Dikul, Alyosha Chertsov, Vasiliy Livanov	Adventure, Drama, Family, Science fiction	
Farewell, Moscow Gang	Прощай, шпана замоскворецкая…	Aleksandr Pankratov	Sergey Makarov, Larisa Borodina	Drama	
First Encounter - Last Encounter	Первая встреча, последняя встреча	Vitaliy Melnikov	Mikhail Morozov, Grazyna Szapolowska, Oleg Efremov	Comedy	
Forgotten Melody for a Flute	Забытая мелодия для флейты	Eldar Ryazanov	Leonid Filatov, Tatyana Dogileva, Irina Kupchenko, Valentin Gaft, Vsevolod Sanayev, Olga Volkova	Comedy	
Friend	Друг	Leonid Kvinikhidze	Sergey Shakurov, Vasily Livanov	Drama	
The Gardener	Садовник	Viktor Buturlin	Oleg Borisov, Lev Borisov	Drama	
The Garden of Desires	Сад желаний	Ali Hamroyev	Marianna Velizheva	Drama	
Joys of the Youth	Забавы молодых	Yevgeni Gerasimov	Stanislav Lyubshin	Drama	
The Kreutzer Sonata	Крейцерова соната	Mikhail Shveytser	Oleg Yankovskiy, Aleksandr Trofimov	Drama	
Laughter and Grief by the White Sea	Смех и го́ре у Бе́ла мо́ря	Leonid Nosyrev	Tatyana Vasilyeva, Klara Rumyanova, Yevgeny Leonov	Animation	
The Left-Hander	Левша	Sergei Ovcharov	Nikolai Stotskii, Vladimir Gostyukhin, Leonid Kuravlyov, Yury Yakovlev, Lev Lemke	Comedy, drama	
Lilac Ball	Лиловый шар	Pavel Arsenov	Natalya Guseva, Alexander Gusev, Boris Shcherbakov	Science-fiction	
The Lonely Voice of Man	Одинокий голос человека	Alexander Sokurov	Tatyana Goryacheva	Drama	
A Man from the Boulevard des Capuchines	Человек с бульвара Капуцинов	Alla Surikova	Andrei Mironov, Aleksandra Yakovleva, Nikolai Karachentsov, Oleg Tabakov	Comedy	
Mio in the Land of Faraway	Мио, мой Мио	Vladimir Grammatikov	Christopher Lee, Christian Bale, Nicholas Pickard, Timothy Bottoms, Susannah York	Fantasy	Co-production between Sweden, Norway and the Soviet Union
Mirror for a Hero	Зеркало для героя	Vladimir Khotinenko	Sergey Koltakov	Science fiction	
Moonzund	Моонзунд	Aleksandr Muratov	Oleg Menshikov, Vladimir Gostyukhin, Lyudmila Nilskaya, Nikolai Karachentsov, Yury Belyayev, Boris Klyuyev	War film	
Mournful Unconcern	Скорбное бесчувствие	Alexander Sokurov	Ramaz Chkhikvadze, Alla Osipenko	Drama	Nominated for the Golden Bear at the 37th Berlin International Film Festival in 1987.
Once Lied	Единожды солгав…	Vladimir Bortko	Yury Belyayev, Elena Solovey, Irina Skobtseva	Drama	
The Pathfinder	Следопыт	Pavel Lyubimov	Yuri Avsharov, Andrejs Zagars	Adventure	
Plumbum, or The Dangerous Game	Плюмбум, или опасная игра	Vadim Abdrashitov	Anton Androsov, Yelena Dmitriyeva, Elena Yakovleva	Drama	
Robinsonada or My English Grandfather	Робинзонада, или Мой английский дедушка	Nana Djordjadze	Janri Lolashvili, Nineli Chankvetadze, Guram Pirtskhalava	Comedy	Was screened in the Un Certain Regard section at the 1987 Cannes Film Festival, where it won the Caméra d'Or.
She with a Broom, He in a Black Hat	Она с метлой, он в чёрной шляпе	Vitaliy Makarov	Mikhail Svetin, Nina Ruslanova	Musical	
The Tale about the Painter in Love	Сказка про влюблённого маляра	Nadezhda Kosheverova	Nikolay Stotskiy, Nina Urgant	Drama	
Team 33	Команда «33»	Nikolai Gusarov	Yuriy Nazarov, Aleksandr Rakhlenko, Sergey Tezov	Drama	
Through Main Street with an Orchestra	По главной улице с оркестром	Pyotr Todorovsky	Oleg Borisov, Lidiya Fedoseyeva-Shukshina, Marina Zudina, Valentin Gaft, Igor Kostolevsky, Valentina Telichkina	Musical	
Tomorrow Was the War	Завтра была война	Yuri Kara	Sergei Nikonenko, Nina Ruslanova, Vera Alentova, Natalya Negoda	Drama	
Tower	Башня	Viktor Tregubovich	Olga Ostroumova, Vadim Lobanov, Georgiy Burkov	Drama	
Tracker	Филёр	Roman Balayan	Oleg Yankovsky, Yelena Safonova	Drama	
Visit to Minotaur	Визит к Минотавру	Eldor Urazbayev	Sergey Shakurov, Anna Kamenkova, Aleksandr Filippenko	Crime drama	
