= Hello, Fools! =

- Directed by: Eldar Ryazanov
- Written by: Eldar Ryazanov; Aleksei Timm
- Produced by: Leonid Bitz
- Starring: Tatyana Drubich; Slava Polunin; Tatyana Dogileva; Boris Shcherbakov
- Cinematography: Vladimir Nakhabtsev; Pavel Lebeshev; Vadim Alisov
- Music by: Andrey Petrov
- Production company: film studio "Luch"
- Release date: 29 December 1996
- Running time: 112 minutes
- Country: Russia
- Language: Russian

Hello, Fools! (Russian: Привет, дуралеи!, romanized: Privet, duralei!) is a 1996 Russian film directed by Eldar Ryazanov. The film is a fantastical melodrama and comedy.

== Plot ==
Jura Kablukov is a cheerful, kind, but very unlucky man. He works as a cleaner of historical monuments in Moscow, together with his friend, Fedor, a folk craftsman, who is spoiled with women's attention. Kablukov is divorced and his ex-wife, Svetlana, a millionaire manager of a fashion agency, wants to evict him from their apartment.

Some time ago Kablukov had a strange dream: he, Jura Kablukov, is the French jeweler Auguste Derulen, who lives with his wife, beautiful Polina in Moscow during the October Revolution. On the eve of a search (equivalent to a brazen robbery) committed by "revolutionary" soldiers and sailors, Auguste and Polina hide gold and jewelry into a statue adorning the walls of their apartment.

Soon an even more strange event comes to pass. Jura meets with Ksenia, a sweet and kind but very absentminded girl. Ksenia is losing vision catastrophically fast, and because of this, constantly lands into trouble. Ksenia is similar to the jeweler's wife out Jura's dream, and it soon becomes clear that she is a descendant of the Derulen family.

Thus it appears that Jura's dream was prophetic; the events he experienced in the dream truly took place many years ago. On the advice of Fedor, Kablukov's experienced friend, the buddies begin to search for treasures that are still immured in the statue, which is located in Ksenia's apartment.

== Cast ==
- Tatyana Drubich as Ksenia Zasypkina/Polina Derulen
- Slava Polunin as Jura Kablukov/Auguste Derulen (voice by Andrey Myagkov)
- Tatyana Dogileva as Svetlana, the former Jura Kablukov's wife, a millionaire
- Boris Shcherbakov as Fedor, driver, gunner and folk craftsman
- Alexander Schirvindt as leader of the Social-Socialist party, is a clear parody of both Gennady Zyuganov and Vladimir Zhirinovsky
- Olga Volkova as ophthalmologist
- Vyacheslav Kulakov as Tolik, Svetlana's driver
- Aleksandr Pashutin as drunk revolutionary officer from Jura Kablukov's dream
- Andrey Smolyakov as Volodya, bodyguard
- Sergey Stepanchenko as Stepan, bodyguard
- Anatoliy Rudenko as Mitrofan, Jura Kablukov's son (acting debut)
- Ruslan Akhmetov as customer
- Alexey Buldakov as foreman from Ukraine
- Nikolai Garo as Ksenia Zasypkina's unlucky admirer
- Nikita Pomerantcev as Ksenia Zasypkina's unlucky admirer
- Yan Tsapnik as real estate agent
- Eldar Ryazanov as Nikolai Timofeyevich, director of the bookstore

== Facts ==
- The film was banned in Ukraine because Jan Tsapnik was declared as a danger to the country.
