= Sergei Artsibashev =

Russian actor (1951–2015)

- Born: Sergei Nikolayevich Artsibashev; 14 September 1951; Kalja, Sverdlovsk Oblast, Russian SFSR, Soviet Union
- Died: 12 July 2015 (aged 63); Moscow, Russia
- Citizenship: Soviet Union; Russia
- Education: Sverdlovsk Theatre School; Russian Academy of Theatre Arts
- Occupations: Actor, theatre director
- Years active: 1980–2015
- Employers: Taganka Theatre, Mayakovsky Theatre, Pokrovka Theatre
- Political party: United Russia
- Awards: People's Artist of Russia; Honoured Worker of the Arts Industry of Russia; Order of Honour; State Prize of the Russian Federation; Golden Eagle Award

Sergei Nikolayevich Artsibashev (Russian: Серге́й Никола́евич Арциба́шев), less Artsybashev (Russian: Арцыба́шев); September 14, 1951 — July 12, 2015) was a Russian theater director and actor. From 2002 until 2011 he was the artistic director at Moscow's Mayakovsky Theatre.

Artsibashev was recognized as People's Artist of the Russian Federation (2005) and made a chevalier of the Order of Honour (2009).

He died of cancer on July 12, 2015.

== Selected filmography ==
- This Scoundrel Sidorov (1983) as Vasily Trofimovich
- A Cruel Romance (1984) as Gulyaev
- Do Not Marry, Girls (1985) as designer
- Forgotten Melody for a Flute (1987) as Ikshanov
- Time to Fly (1987) as Sergei Turkin
- Defence Counsel Sedov (1988) as Sergei Nikolaevich
- Down with Commerce on the Love Front, or Reciprocity Services (1988) as Sergei Nikolaevich
- Ladder (1989) as Georgy Staritsky
- The Tale of the Unextinguished Moon (1990) as Alexey Popov
- Little Face (1990) as Kostya, Yulya's ex-husband
- Flying Dutchman (1990) as Captain
- The Inner Circle (1991) as Beria's Officer
- Bedtime Story (1991) as Ochkasty
- Promised Heaven (1991) as Kirill
- Children Running from a Thunderstorm (1991) as Lyosha
- Do You Remember the Smell of Lilac... (1992) as Grigory Ostapovich
- June 22, at Exactly 4 o'clock... (1992) as Babinov
- Dashing Couple (1993) as Gribov
- What a Mess! (1995) as Registry Office Worker
- Go! (1995) as Stepan Kharitonovich Shmarikov
- The Invisible Traveler (1999) as Adjutant General Diebitsch
- Demobbed (2000) as Ensign Kazakov
- Demobbed 002 (2000) as Ensign Kazakov
- Demobbed 003 (2001) as Ensign Kazakov
- Demobbed 004 (2001) as Ensign Kazakov
- Demobbed: Back in the Fight (2001) as Ensign Kazakov
- Binge Drinking Theory (2003) as Dedulik
- 12 (2007) as 10th Juror
- The Fool (2014) as Tulskiy (final film role)
