= Old Hags =

2000 film by Eldar Ryazanov

- Directed by: Eldar Ryazanov
- Written by: Eldar Ryazanov; Vladimir Moiseenko
- Produced by: Vladimir Dostal
- Starring: Liya Akhedzhakova; Lyudmila Gurchenko; Svetlana Kryuchkova; Irina Kupchenko
- Cinematography: Grigory Belenky
- Music by: Andrey Petrov
- Production company: Kinomost
- Release date: 3 March 2000
- Running time: 127 minutes
- Country: Russia
- Language: Russian

Old Hags (Russian: Старые клячи, translit. Starye klyachi, Old nags, "Old useless horses") is a 2000 Russian comedy film directed by Eldar Ryazanov.

== Plot ==
Four middle-aged women with different fates live in Moscow. One of them, Anna — a PhD candidate and former head of a laboratory, has to work at a car wash and is constantly subjected to insults from the owner. Another woman, Lisa — a former trade-union worker, now works at a market. The owner of the vegetable shop constantly penalizes her for allegedly stealing money. Third — a former railway worker, sells pies in an underpass. Finally, Lyuba – an intelligent woman – has to sell newspapers. All of these women are very different, but they share one thing — they are most loyal friends, always ready to help each other.

Soon Lyuba gets in a terrible situation. She decides to sell her luxurious apartment (her parental inheritance) with a view of the Kremlin for 100 thousand dollars, and buy inexpensive housing somewhere in the outskirts of the capital. Businessman Khomenko, who turned out to be a fraud, fraudulently takes possession of Lyuba's flat, and she finds herself in the street with no money and no housing. In desperation, Lyuba appealed for help, and three of her friends begin to act.

The women decide to punish the villain Khomenko, completely upsetting his criminal business. As a result of puzzling adventures, ladies return the apartment to Lyuba. In this good deed the girlfriends are helped by theater administrator Lazovsky and general Dubovitsky. However, the actions of the resourceful and brave women were partly outside the law, and therefore the friends are imprisoned. During the trial, the whole truth about the "victim" Khomenko is turned out, and the judge grants an acquittal to the friends. They form a group called "Old Hags" and decide to start concert activities.

== Cast ==
- Liya Akhedzhakova as Lyuba
- Lyudmila Gurchenko as Liza
- Svetlana Kryuchkova as Masha
- Irina Kupchenko as Anna
- Valentin Gaft as general Dubovitsky
- Mikhail Yevdokimov as Timothy Astrakhantsev, businessman from Astrakhan
- Roman Kartsev as Joseph Lazovsky, theater administrator
- Mamuka Kikaleishvili as owner of a vegetable shop
- Nikolai Fomenko as businessman Vassily Khomenko
- Majid Akhedzhakov as Lyuba's father
- Mikhail Derzhavin as Communist party local secretary for Ideology
- Valentina Talyzina as cleaning woman
- Alexander Pashutin as lawyer
- Nina Ter Osipyan as Joseph Lazovsky's mother
- Eldar Ryazanov as judge

== Reception ==
The movie received mostly negative reviews on the time of release and became a box office bomb.

As Sergey Kudryavtsev wrote, I feel both ashamed and sorry for the aged classic of the national cinema; blaming him for his artistic impotence would be the same as making fun of an old man because of his poor health... The final scene where the author (by the way, he (Ryazanov) personally plays the fair judge) bids farewell to his heroes is automatically seen as his personal epitaph that may bring tears of regret to the eyes, like when you are standing in front of a dead man's tomb.

Mikhail Brashinskiy from the Afisha magazine concluded: Ryazanov completely lost his sensibility, together with the USSR, Emil Braginsky and his ear for music. Today he has no idea what makes us laugh or grief, who we are and why we eat our bread. At least I felt that we are living in two different countries after finishing the film. He seems to be living on a block of ice that heads somewhere.
