= Applause, Applause... =

- Russian: Аплодисменты, аплодисменты…
- Directed by: Viktor Buturlin
- Written by: Viktor Merezhko
- Produced by: Lenfilm
- Starring: Lyudmila Gurchenko; Oleg Tabakov; Olga Volkova; Aleksandr Filippenko; Karina Moritts
- Cinematography: Vladimir Vasilyev
- Music by: Aleksandr Morozov
- Release date: 1984
- Running time: 77 minute
- Country: Soviet Union
- Language: Russian

Applause, Applause... (Russian: Аплодисменты, аплодисменты…) is a 1984 Soviet musical film directed by Viktor Buturlin.

The film tells about an entertaining artist who dreams of playing a dramatic role. And suddenly she gets such an opportunity.

== Plot ==
Valeria Goncharova is an estrada artist who comes across a serious script: a dramatic story of wartime love. She believes this role is meant for her, but the film crew has a different opinion. Due to Valeria's persistent pursuit, the director eventually agrees to let her audition, and he gradually becomes convinced that she truly embodies the film's main character. Meanwhile, Valeria increasingly realizes that the dramatic role may not be for her after all.

== Cast ==
- Lyudmila Gurchenko
- Oleg Tabakov as Shevtsov
- Olga Volkova
- Aleksandr Filippenko
- Karina Moritts
- Aleksandr Shirvindt
- Tatyana Parkina
- Gelena Ivlieva
- Lev Lemke
- Algirdas Paulavičius (actor)
