= Station for Two =

- 1983 English film poster by Aleksandr Makhov
- Directed by: Eldar Ryazanov
- Written by: Emil Braginsky; Eldar Ryazanov
- Starring: Lyudmila Gurchenko; Oleg Basilashvili; Nikita Mikhalkov; Nonna Mordyukova; Mikhail Kononov
- Cinematography: Vadim Alisov
- Edited by: Valeriya Belova
- Music by: Andrei Petrov
- Distributed by: Mosfilm
- Release date: February 11, 1983
- Running time: 141 min.
- Country: Soviet Union
- Language: Russian

Station for Two (Russian: Вокзал для двоих, romanized: Vokzal dlya dvoikh) is a 1982 Soviet romantic comedy directed by Eldar Ryazanov. The film became the Soviet box office leader of 1983 with a total of 35.8 million ticket sales. It was entered into the 1983 Cannes Film Festival.

== Plot summary ==
The film opens with a man being given leave from a prison overnight to visit his wife in the nearby village. The film then cuts to a busy railway station and a train pulling into the platform for a 20 minutes stop and a suave man, Platon, getting out. Lunch is served for embarking passengers and an argument ensues over the quality of the food between Platon and waitress, Vera. A policeman is called and he misses his train. Arguments, misunderstandings, falling out and falling in love ensue. Platon, a Moscow pianist, who was on the way to visit his father, confides that he is taking the blame for his wife's killing a pedestrian while driving and the trial takes place very soon. The film ends with Platon returning to Moscow and then cuts back to the beginning storyline - to the prison where the prisoner is making his way to his wife walking the long and freezing journey by foot. The ending is not as he expected.

== Ideas for the filming ==
The script (the beginning and the end of the movie) is based on two real stories from the life of well-known people – the composer Mikael Tariverdiev and the poet Yaroslav Smelyakov.

The idea was given to the authors by Tariverdiyev. During the trip on his car, he took the passenger's seat and had one of the famous actresses drive his car. Unfortunately, it ended tragically. They had an accident and a pedestrian died. The composer decided to take the blame on himself to save the woman. There was a very long legal process that lasted about two years. Mikael was found guilty, but he was saved by amnesty. However, the affair with that woman did not last long.

The second story, which happened with the poet Smelyakov, was used in the ending of the film. He was arrested in the early 1950s and was sent to the Arctic Circle. In 1953, he was given a day off to meet his friends. The next morning after the feast friends woke up late and overslept the roll-call. Delay for the roll-call was equated with the escape. So, Smelyakov and his friends had to run a few kilometers along the snow-covered tundra to the camp. Towards the end of the road, his friends had to drag him up to the very gates of the camp, as he was too tired.

== Cast ==
- Lyudmila Gurchenko as Vera Nikolayevna Nefyodova, waitress
- Oleg Basilashvili as Platon Sergeyevich Ryabinin, pianist
- Nikita Mikhalkov as Andrey, conductor
- Nonna Mordyukova as "Uncle Misha", a speculator
- Mikhail Kononov as Nikolasha, militiaman
- Anastasia Voznesenskaya as Yuliya, on duty at the hotel
- Aleksandr Shirvindt as Shurik, pianist
- Tatyana Dogileva as Marina, on duty at the hotel
- Olga Volkova as Violetta, waitress
- Raisa Etush as Lyuda, waitress
- Viktor Bortsov as drunken visitor restaurant
- Anatoli Skoryakin as commandant
- Stanislav Sadalsky as drunk man with a carburetor
- Alla Budnitskaya as Masha, Platon's wife
- Eldar Ryazanov as Railroad Supervisor
