= Promised Heaven =

The Promised Heaven
- Directed by: Eldar Ryazanov
- Written by: Eldar Ryazanov, Henrietta Altman
- Starring: Liya Akhedzhakova; Valentin Gaft; Olga Volkova; Leonid Bronevoy; Oleg Basilashvili
- Cinematography: Leonid Kalashnikov
- Music by: Andrey Petrov
- Production company: Mosfilm
- Release date: January 1992
- Running time: 125 minutes
- Country: Soviet Union
- Language: Russian

Promised Heaven (Russian: Небеса обетованные, romanized: Nebesa obetovannye) is a 1991 Soviet film directed by Eldar Ryazanov. The film is a fantastical social tragicomedy.

== Plot ==
The movie is set in against the dusk of the Soviet Union and associated changes in economical and social life. Near one of Moscow's railway stations, on a landfill site, a group of bums lives. Due to a variety of reasons, once prosperous people have lost their jobs, homes, loved ones and began living at a dump. This dump society is remarkably diverse and includes Solomon, a Jewish violinist, a crazy train driver (who brought his steam locomotive to the dump), and a talented artist named Anthemia (Phima). Their leader, a former party official nicknamed "the President", announces that he has made contact with aliens who will soon take them all to a paradise planet, with blue snow being the sign of their arrival. Into this community comes Katya Ivanova, an elderly woman thrown out onto the street by her own son and suffering from memory loss. She is taken under the wing of Phima, who introduces Katya to the harsh life of the outcasts.

Phima and Katya end up at the police station, arrested for 15 days for hooliganism. However, due to the lack of a holding cell for women, Phima and Katya are placed, "as an exception", with the temporarily detained Semyon Bakurin, a retired colonel and veteran of the Soviet-Japanese War. After release, Phima brings Katya to the dump "to her people". Bakurin also visits the dump to see his new friends. At that moment, representatives of an American firm arrive at the dump. They plan to build a condom factory and a hotel on the site, but the bums chase them away. They must hold out at the dump until the blue snow appears, no matter what.

Next, Phima, Katya, the President, and the colonel attend the wedding of Phima's brother, Fyodor Elistratov, who is marrying young Jeanne. In the midst of the celebration, it is revealed that Fyodor, being homeless, has squatted in someone else's dacha. When the real owners arrive with the police, all the bums are sent to a nursing home. Overwhelmed by the shame of having deceived Jeanne (though he doesn't care that Jeanne and her shrewd aunt from the provinces had actually just wanted to seize his house), Fyodor dies of a heart attack, transforming into an angel.

Meanwhile, the conflict over the dump intensifies. Representatives of the firm, accompanied by Mirov, the district ispolkom chairman, again try to evict the bums, but are driven off. Realizing their opponents will not relent, Phima and the President turn for help to the President's ex-wife, Aglaya, a party veteran. However, she refuses to plead their case before the ispolkom, citing "ideological reasons".

The next day, Katya's sons arrive at the dump to take her back, but she, having regained her memory, drives them away. She tells her friends her story: while working at a government dacha, she had two sons by two high-ranking party officials, who grew up to be just as cynical, entitled and infantile as their fathers. At that very moment, blue snow begins to fall from the sky, which means the aliens will arrive soon. The President and his "fellow citizens" go out to meet the good aliens.

Instead of aliens, troops and riot police led by Mirov appear to clear the territory by force. They order the bums to leave the dump immediately and are ready to begin demolition using T-55 tanks serving as bulldozers. Aglaya, outraged by the authorities' deception, arrives on the scene, but a tank begins to demolish the dump, beginning with the colonel's car and almost running over Bakurin himself. A clash ensues, and the group of bums, led by the President, manages to break through and escape on an old steam locomotive. The police officer overtakes it in a car and switches the points. But instead of colliding with a stationary car on the tracks, the steam locomotive unexpectedly soars into the sky. Seeing this, Mirov orders the locomotive to be stopped using an anti-aircraft vehicle, but even that doesn't help. The steam locomotive leaves Earth forever, carrying its passengers to the Promised Heaven the people who were no longer needed on it.

== Cast ==
- Liya Akhedzhakova as Anthemia Stepanovna (Phima)
- Olga Volkova as Katya Ivanova
- Valentin Gaft as Dmitry "President" Loginov
- Leonid Bronevoy as Semyon Bakurin, retired Soviet Army colonel
- Oleg Basilashvili as Fyodor Yelistratov, Phima's brother
- Svetlana Nemolyaeva as Aglaya Sviderskaya, Loginov's ex-wife
- Sergei Artsibashev as Kirill, Katya Ivanova's eldest son / Kirill Grigorievich, large party official
- Mikhail Filippov as Vasya, Katya Ivanova's younger son / Vasily Ilyich Prokhorov, large party official
- Natalya Gundareva as Lyuska, Vasya's live-in girlfriend
- Natalia Shchukina as Jeannа, Fyodor Yelistratov's wife
- Vyacheslav Nevinny as Stepan
- Roman Kartsev as Solomon
- Alexander Pashutin as the train driver
- Nina Ruslanova as Jeanne's aunt, tailoress from Tver
- Alexander Belyavsky as Oleg Mirov, chairman of the ispolkom
- Valery Nosik as the bum
- Maria Vinogradova as the old beggar woman
- Aleksandr Pankratov-Chyorny as Sidorchuk, a representative of the American firm
- Stanislav Sadalskiy as the photographer at the wedding
- Lyudmila Ivanova as Claudia, the cat lady
- Tatyana Kravchenko as the matron of the nursing home
- Eldar Ryazanov as the man in the diner

== Awards ==
- Awards of magazine "Soviet Screen": "Best film of the year" and "Best actress of the year" (1991)
- Nika Award: "Best Movie", "Best Director", "Best Actor in a Supporting Role", "Best Music", "Best Sound", "Best Artistic Direction" (1992)
- Film Critics Award of the film festival "Constellation" (1992)
- Awards of International Film Festival in Madrid: Grand Prix - "Best fiction film" (1992)
