= Aleksandr Pashutin =

Soviet and Russian actor

- Александр Сергеевич Пашутин
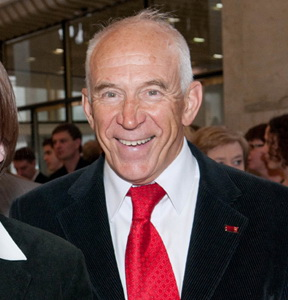
- Born: 28 January 1943; Saint Petersburg, Russian Empire
- Died: Moscow, RSFSR, Soviet Union
- Education: Moscow Art Theatre School
- Occupation: Actor
- Years active: 1968-present
- Title: People's Artist of Russia, Merited Artist of the Russian Federation
- Awards: Medal "Defender of a Free Russia",

Aleksandr Sergeyevich Pashutin (Russian: Алекса́ндр Серге́евич Пашу́тин; born January 28, 1943, Moscow, USSR) is a Soviet and Russian stage and film actor, People's Artist of the Russian Federation (1999).

== Selected filmography ==
- 1975: Bonus as Oleg Kachnov
- 1976: How Czar Peter the Great Married Off His Moor as painter
- 1977: White Bim Black Ear as dog show judge
- 1977: The Second Attempt of Viktor Krokhin as Sergey Andreevich
- 1977: Destiny as crazy man (uncredited)
- 1980: Air Crew as a passenger with a dislocated jaw
- 1980: Investigation Held by ZnaToKi as Gorobets
- 1980: The Evening Labyrinth as waiter
- 1980: White Snow of Russia as Semyonov
- 1982: Incident at Map Grid 36-80 as Captain Gremyachkin
- 1982: The Train Has Stopped as train passenger
- 1983: Quarantine as colleague of the grandmother
- 1983: From the Life of a Chief of the Criminal Police as driver Utkin
- 1983: Start Liquidation as Platonov
- 1984: TASS Is Authorized to Declare... as Gmyrya
- 1984: Planet Parade as Spirkin, architect
- 1986: Plumbum, or The Dangerous Game as Ruslan's father
- 1987: Gardes-Marines, Ahead! as Yakovlev
- 1988: The Adventures of Quentin Durward, Marksman of the Royal Guard as Olivier le Daim
- 1991: Rock'n'roll for Princesses as advisor
- 1991: The Inner Circle as train commandant
- 1991: Promised Heaven as train driver
- 1992: Encore, Once More Encore! as Major Skidonenko
- 1993: Prediction as conductor
- 1996: Hello, Fools! as red commissioner
- 2000: Old Hags as lawyer
- 2000: Still Waters as hotel employee
- 2005: The Fall of the Empire as general Grigoriev
- 2007: Russian Translation as general Sorokin
- 2007: Attack on Leningrad as Tregub
- 2009: The Return of the Musketeers, or The Treasures of Cardinal Mazarin as Paul
- 2010: Burnt by the Sun 2 as head of the Gulag
- 2012: Rzhevsky Versus Napoleon as Jacques
