= Still Waters (2000 film) =

- Directed by: Eldar Ryazanov
- Written by: Eldar Ryazanov; Emil Braginsky
- Produced by: Anatoli Papanov; Leonid Bitz
- Starring: Aleksandr Abdulov; Oksana Korostishevskaya; Olga Volkova; Lyubov Polishchuk
- Cinematography: Nikolay Nemolyaev; Lomer Akhvlediani
- Music by: Mikael Tariverdiev; Bulat Okudzhava; Sergey Nikitin
- Production companies: film studio "Luch" film studio "Gulliver" film studio "TriT"
- Release date: 2000
- Running time: 132 minutes
- Country: Russia
- Language: Russian

Still Waters (Russian: Тихие омуты, romanized: Tikhie omuti) is 2000 Russian romantic comedy-drama directed by Eldar Ryazanov.

== Plot ==
Anton M. Kashtanov is a talented surgeon and head of a large clinic. He decides to escape his domineering and bad-tempered wife Polina in the village of Still Waters. Here he reconnects with his childhood friend, the head of the local nature reserve. This pastoral idyll is unsettled by one matter: at the time of Kashtanov's departure two million dollars have disappeared from his foundation. Two strong women, who are a police detective and a TV reporter, launch independent investigations.

Hot on Kashtanov’s heels is the dolled-up TV reporter Jackie, who has sniffed out a sensational story, as the surgeon has been put on the federal wanted list for his own disappearance along with two million in hard currency. There, at the exclusive boat station where the surgeon has found work as a boatman, the two of them embark on a romance.

== Cast ==
- Alexander Abdulov as academician Anton M. Kashtanov
- Oksana Korostishevskaya as journalist Yevgenia Tobolskaya (Jackie)
- Lyubov Polishchuk as Polina, Kashtanov's wife
- Yan Tsapnik as Vlad, the cameraman
- Olga Volkova as Varvara Petrovna Muromova, police detective
- Andrey Makarevich as the forester
- Andrey Smolyakov as Ivan, Kashtanov's assistant
- Mikhail Dorozhkin as Nikita, Kashtanov's son from his first marriage
- Anatoly Lobotsky as Alexey Yozhikov, businessman
- Marat Basharov as the traffic cop
- Aleksandr Pashutin as the hotel employee
- Eldar Ryazanov as the radiologist
- Alexander Nevsky as Sergey Ivanov, the bodyguard
- Olga Pogodina as the smoking girl
- Gennady Khazanov as Pavlik
- Leonid Parfyonov as the journalist

== Facts ==
- Eldar Ryazanov said that the character of Kashtanov was modeled after Anton Chekhov.
- The film was banned in Ukraine because Yan Tsapnik was declared as a danger to the country.
