= Office Romance =

- Original film poster
- Russian: Служебный роман
- Directed by: Eldar Ryazanov
- Written by: Eldar Ryazanov; Emil Braginsky
- Based on: Co-workers by: Eldar Ryazanov; and Emil Braginsky
- Starring: Andrey Myagkov; Alisa Freindlich; Oleg Basilashvili; Svetlana Nemolyaeva; Liya Akhedzhakova
- Cinematography: Vladimir Nakhabtsev
- Music by: Andrei Petrov
- Distributed by: Mosfilm
- Release date: 26 October 1977
- Running time: 159 minutes
- Country: Soviet Union
- Language: Russian
- Budget: 500,000 rubles

Office Romance (Russian: Служебный роман, romanized: Sluzhebny roman) is a 1977 Soviet comedy film directed by Eldar Ryazanov. The film's plot is based on the stageplay Co-workers (Сослуживцы) written by Ryazanov and Emil Braginsky, and tells the story of Ludmila Kalugina, head of a statistical bureau, and her subordinate, economist Anatoly Novoseltsev, who come from mutual aversion to love.

Filmed at Mosfilm in 1976 and released in 1977, Office Romance was a box office success, the leader of Soviet film distribution in 1978 and still enjoyed wide popularity in the former Soviet republics. Both romantic drama and screwball comedy, the film is noted for its scenes of Moscow in the late 1970s, and for its comical depiction of the everyday life and customs of Soviet society during the Era of Stagnation.

== Plot ==
In Moscow in 1976, Anatoly Yefremovich Novoseltsev, a clumsy but goodhearted single father of two sons, works at a statistical bureau. The bureau is under the leadership of an industrious and strict single woman in her late 30s, Ludmila Prokofievna Kalugina, nicknamed "our frump" (наша мымра, also translated "our hag") by her subordinates. He vies for a promotion and a pay raise, but is too timid to bring up this discussion. He is encouraged by his good friend, former classmate and colleague Olga "Olya" Ryzhova, a married woman living in the suburbs, whose husband is recuperating from a major operation in Yessentuki and whose teenage son is an athlete. Another former classmate and old friend of his, Yuri "Yura" Grigorievich Samokhvalov, recently assigned back to Moscow from Switzerland, nominates his old friend as a head of the light industry department to Kalugina, but the nomination is rejected. Novoseltsev, heeding Samokhvalov's advice, nervously tries to flirt with "the Frump" at a party in Samokhvalov's apartment, but Kalugina is further repelled by his poor attempts to impress her. Eventually drunk, Novoseltsev becomes irritated and tells Kalugina that he considers her "dry, inhuman and heartless".

The following morning, Novoseltsev seeks Kalugina to apologize, but inadvertently drives her to tears. Kalugina reveals that she is aware of her reputation among her subordinates. They have a heart-to-heart conversation, start getting closer and soon grow fond of each other. Kalugina gradually lets down the armor of a hardened woman and puts more efforts in improving her overall appearance which surprises her colleagues.

The relationship between Anatoly and Ludmila evolves, full of comical situations and repartees. At the same time drama unfolds between Olga Ryzhova and Yuri Samokhvalov who dated many years ago at the university. Despite both being married, Olga's romantic feelings are rekindled by Samokhvalov's recent arrival at the office. He, however, treats her just as an old friend and colleague. Olga begins to write him love letters that she passes to him through Vera "Verochka", the Frump's secretary, an efficient intel gatherer and an enormous gossip, who eventually reads the letters and leaks the affairs to the entire office. Samokhvalov, weary of the letters, relays the situation to the meddlesome Shura, the bureau's labor union committee activist, an accountant and the office's busybody. The letters, which he gives to Shura and asks her to "sort out the problem" at the committee, are then confiscated by Kalugina, who reprimands Samokhvalov for his tactlessness and demands that the matter is handled privately between him and Ryzhova. Later, Ryzhova, broken-hearted and humiliated, asks Samokhvalov to return the letters to her and returns to her work and life routine.

Once he learns about Samokhvalov's heartless handling of Ryzhova's indiscretion, Novoseltsev angrily confronts him and later Shura for her gossip tendency. Samokhvalov retaliates by disclosing Novoseltsev's initial "plan" to Kalugina. She is shocked and thinks he is just another man deserting her like her last lover. She summons him to her office, appoints him as head of the light industry department and announces her intention to end their relationship while sarcastically praises his plan to achieve the promotion. Ashamed, Novoseltsev admits that while he initially pursued her with ulterior motives, has grown to appreciate her as an excellent leader and love her, to which Kalugina refutes. Frustrated, Novoseltsev rejects the promotion and tenders his resignation, which Kalugina continuously denies to spite him. This situation climaxes into a fiery spat that turns into a loud scuffle right in the office as a furious Ludmila chases Novoseltsev out of the building. They jump on a back seat of her service car and as Novoseltsev manages to comfort Ludmila, they are seen embracing. A subtitle suggests that in 9 months there will be three boys in Novoseltsev's family, implying another son for the couple.

== Casting and production ==
Alisa Freindlich was the film director's primary choice for the role of Kalugina. Eldar Ryazanov created the character with Freindlich in mind. Moreover, he started working on the screenplay seriously only after securing consent of all the actors he wanted to cast to participate in the film. It was a rare case in Soviet cinema when a director would be allowed to cast all actors of his own choice without preliminary screen-tests and approval of the Art Council. Ryazanov worried that Freindlich would not be able to come to Moscow for shooting of the film because of stage performances and rehearsals she was busy with in her native Leningrad. So he assured both the actress and her management that she would be allowed to go to Leningrad on the first demand. It came out that she was compelled to leave for the theater often, and thus traveled between Moscow and Leningrad all the time.

In order to create a genuine image of a frumpy boss, Ryazanov and Freindlich searched through all the wardrobes of the studio for baggy, old-fashioned clothes. Cameraman Vladimir Nakhabtsev brought to the studio the old thick-frammed glasses that belonged to his father - they helped to complete the image.

Ryazanov took some risk casting Andrey Myagkov for the second time for the role of a clumsy intellectual, similar to this in 1975 hit The Irony of Fate. Not everyone agreed with the director's decision upon casting. Oleg Basilashvili didn't like the role of the "villain" Samokhvalov. Like Freindlich, he had to travel frequently between Moscow and Leningrad due to obligations on the Leningrad stage, and he believed that his worn-out look would be ideal to portray an unkempt and humble Novoseltsev. Later, during the shooting he admitted that the director's choice was right. But it was a hard task for make-up artists to make a glossy complacent Samokhvalov out of the exhausted Basilashvili, and, on the contrary, a sloppy bachelor Novoseltsev out of the refined Myagkov.

One of few roles for which screen-tests were taken was the role of the activist Shura. Actress Ludmila Ivanova, who in real life was head of a local labor union committee at the Sovremennik Theatre, got into the role quickly and was the most convincing when she shouted out: "Comrades, donate 50 copecks!"

== Audience reaction, critical reception and awards ==
Office Romance was a Soviet hit movie in 1978 having 58.4 million viewers, and still remains one of the most popular Soviet-era films in Russia and other former Soviet republics. Alisa Freindlich and Andrey Myagkov were named Best Actors of the year by readers of Soviet Screen magazine.

The film received general approval from critics; there was not one negative review of the film. High artistic level, skills and organic collaboration of director and actors were noted, as well as vivid portrayal of Moscow, comic elements in parallel with investigation of moral issues.

Members of the State Art Council nominated the leading actors for the USSR State Prize. Alisa Freindlich was the only lead one who didn't receive the Prize - according to the rules of that time, an actor couldn't be given a new prize within two years of getting a previous one, and Freindlich had already been awarded for her stage performance a year before the release of the film.

On the 40th anniversary of the film's release, Google released a Google Doodle.

In 2011, a remake was released, titled Office Romance. Our Time, with Sarik Andreasyan serving as director.

== Soundtrack ==
The songs from the film, performed by Alisa Freindlich and Andrey Myagkov, became hits in the USSR.

- "Моей душе покоя нет" (For The Sake O' Somebody; verbatim: "My soul has no rest") by Andrei Petrov – Robert Burns, translation by Samuil Marshak – the main theme; two versions sung by Alisa Freindlich and Andrey Myagkov.
- "Нас в набитых трамваях болтает" (We Are Jolted in Crowded Trams) by Andrei Petrov – Yevgeny Yevtushenko, sung by Andrey Myagkov.
- "Обрываются речи влюблённых / Облетают последние маки" (Lovers' Talks Stop Suddenly / The Last Poppies Shed Their Petals) by Andrei Petrov – Nikolay Zabolotsky – Two songs with the same music by different lyrics, sung by Alisa Freindlich and Andrey Myagkov respectively.
- "Песенка о погоде" (A Song About Weather), also known as "У природы нет плохой погоды" (Nature Has No Bad Weather), by Andrei Petrov – Eldar Ryazanov, sung by Alisa Freindlich.
- "Увертюра" (Overture) by Andrei Petrov – Robert Burns – based on the main theme and "Lovers' Talks Stop Suddenly", opens the film.
- "Утро" (Morning), instrumental by Andrei Petrov.
- "Дождь" (Rain), instrumental by Andrei Petrov, based on "A Song About Weather".
- "Танец воспоминаний" (The Dance of Remembrances), instrumental by Andrei Petrov, based on the main theme.
- "Осень" (Fall), instrumental by Andrei Petrov
- "Финал" (Final) by Andrei Petrov – Robert Burns, based on the main theme.

In 2004, DJ Groove from Saint Petersburg released remixes of the main themes of the film that were frequently broadcast by local radio stations.

== Cast ==
Actor	Role
Andrey Myagkov	Anatoly Yefremovich Novoseltsev
Alisa Freindlich	Ludmila Prokofievna Kalugina
Oleg Basilashvili	Yuri Grigoryevich Samokhvalov
Svetlana Nemolyayeva	Olga Petrovna Ryzhova
Liya Akhedzhakova	office secretary Verochka
Lyudmila Ivanova	labor union activist Shura
Georgi Burkov	logistics manager
Pyotr Shcherbakov	Pyotr Ivanovich Bublikov
Nelly Pshennaya	Samokhvalov's wife
Alik Denisov	Vova Novoseltsev
