= I Ask to Accuse Klava K. of My Death =

1979 Soviet film by Nikolai Lebedev and Ernest Yasan

- Directed by: Nikolai Lebedev; Ernest Yasan
- Written by: Mikhail Lvovskiy
- Produced by: Boris Griner; Alexey Gusev
- Starring: Vladimir Shevelkov; Nadezhda Gorshkova; Natalia Zhuravleva; Vladimir Sidorov
- Cinematography: Valery Mironov
- Edited by: V. Nesterova
- Music by: Alexander Zhurbin
- Production company: Lenfilm
- Release date: 1979
- Running time: 72 minutes
- Country: Soviet Union
- Language: Russian

I Ask to Accuse Klava K. of My Death (Russian: В моей смерти прошу винить Клаву К., romanized: V moey smerti proshu vinit Klavu K.) is a 1979 Soviet teen film directed by Nikolai Lebedev and Ernest Yasan based on the eponymous story by Mikhail Lvovsky.

== Plot ==
Regional center in the south of Russia. Young intellectuals Pavel and Rita Lavrov bring their four-year-old son Sergei to the kindergarten. He cries and does not want to stay here. Then the headmaster summons the pretty girl Klava Klimkova, who takes the boy to collect acorns. Sergei, with the help of his parents, collects more of them than other children; this causes the girl to experience affinity for him.

Klimkova and Lavrov are in the third grade. He studies well, is active in sports and sings in the school choir. She on the other hand, can only beautifully hand out flowers, but Sergei solves all problems for the girl. He constantly makes Klava gifts—both things belonging to him, and taken from family members.

Klava and Sergei are already in high school. He, as before, is the school's pride—winner of mathematical olympiads, chess champion of the school, athlete and simply a handsome man. Classmate Tanya Ishchenko is unrequitedly in love with him, and for Klava, Seryozha is merely a toy she is already sick of. The young man himself is not able to imagine life without his girlfriend.

A promising new boy from the parallel class Lavrik attracts Klimkova's attention—son of a doctor, also an excellent student, who once even played a draw with Mikhail Tal. Sergei tries to regain the girl's attention, but more and more she shows a desire to break up with him. When the young man threatens to commit suicide, she declares that she would go with him anywhere, only if he was able to fulfill his declaration. With difficulty, Tanya and Lavrik manage to stop Lavrov. Klava, on the contrary, cruelly ridicules Sergei before his classmates. But her actions do not matter—the young man's eyes have become lifeless, and neither the correct words from others, nor a trip to the mountains with his parents can remove him from his depressed state. Upon Sergei's arrival from his hike, it turns out that Tanya's mother has died and the girl left school to make a living. The young man is shocked by this. He no longer sees Klava, but also can not forget her. Even when he wanders around the city with Tanya, he sees his beloved in girls passing by.

Once Sergei and Klava meet at Lavrik's and then go for a walk, and the girl tries to apologize.

After some time, Sergei awkwardly tries to profess his love to Tanya. Afterwards she leaves, and for a long time the boy gazes after her as she is walking away.

== Cast ==
- Maxim Yasan as Sergei Lavrov (as child)
- Andrei Musatov as Sergei Lavrov (as third-grader)
- Vladimir Shevelkov as Sergei Lavrov
- Elena Hopshonosova as Klava (as child)
- Olga Ozheretskovskaya as Klava (as third-grader)
- Nadezhda Gorshkova as Klava Klimkova
- Natalia Zhuravlyova as Tusya (Tatyana Ishchenko)
- Vladimir Sidorov as Lavrik Korniliev
- Lyubov Polishchuk as Vera Sergeevna, mother of Klava
- Valentina Panina as Rita, mother of Sergei
- Victor Kostetskiy as Pavel, father of Sergei
- Anton Granat-Shurik as brother of Sergei
- Veniamin Smekhov as Uncle Seva
- Olga Volkova as Elena Grigorevna, a teacher in a kindergarten
- Lyubov Malinovskaya as Neonila Nikolaevna, music teacher at the Palace of Pioneers
- Alexander Anisimov as Dmitry Alexandrovich, Director of the Palace of Pioneers
- Oleg Yefremov as director of the Palace of Pioneers
- Lyubov Tishchenko as head of the kindergarten
- Larisa Udovichenko as episode

== Awards ==
- Krupskaya State Prize of the RSFSR to Mikhail Lvovsky, Nikolay Lebedev, Ernest Yasan, Valery Mironov, Alexei Fedotov (1981).
- The second prize "For the best film for children and youth" to the film at the 13th WCF (1980).
- The main prize at the XVIII International Film Festival for Children and Youth in Gijón, Spain (1980).
- Diploma of the jury at the 1st All-Union Review of the works of young cinematographers (1979).
- The best film in 1979 for the recognition of the audience jury of the "Screen" club at the VI International Film Festival of Asian, African and Latin American countries in Tashkent (1980).
- Mikhail Lvovsky's screenplay was recognized as the best at the closed professional competition of the Union of Cinematographers of the USSR (1979).
