= Devil, I'm Bored =

1993 film by Yury Borisov

- Russian: Мне скучно, бес
- Directed by: Yury Borisov
- Written by: Yury Borisov
- Produced by: Alexey Shekhtman
- Starring: Oleg Borisov; Yury Posokhov; Andrey Kharitonov; Viktoriya Galdikas; Olga Volkova
- Cinematography: Vladimir Shevtsik
- Edited by: Tatyana Shapiro
- Music by: Yury Krasavin
- Production company: Lenfilm
- Release date: 1993
- Running time: 97 min.
- Country: Russia
- Language: Russian

Devil, I'm Bored (Russian: Мне скучно, бес, romanized: Mne skuchno, bes) is a 1993 Russian fantasy drama film directed by Yury Borisov, based on the writings of Thomas Mann, Aleksandr Pushkin, Johann Wolfgang von Goethe.

== Plot ==
Mephistopheles is very bored. In a market where there is everything, he finds the soul of a ballet dancer.

== Cast ==
- Oleg Borisov as Mephistopheles / God (last role)
- Yury Posokhov as Faust
- Andrey Kharitonov as Emperor
- Viktoriya Galdikas as Margarita
- Olga Volkova as Witch
- Oleg Vedernikov as Ariel
- Mikhail Shtein as Male
- Lyudmila Ksenofontova as Vixen in the Flemish spirit
- Mariya Ter-Markaryan as Vixen in the French spirit
- Vitali Romanov as Iosif
- Kira Kreylis-Petrova as child trafficker
