= Valentin Gaft =

Soviet and Russian actor (1935-2020)

- Валентин Гафт
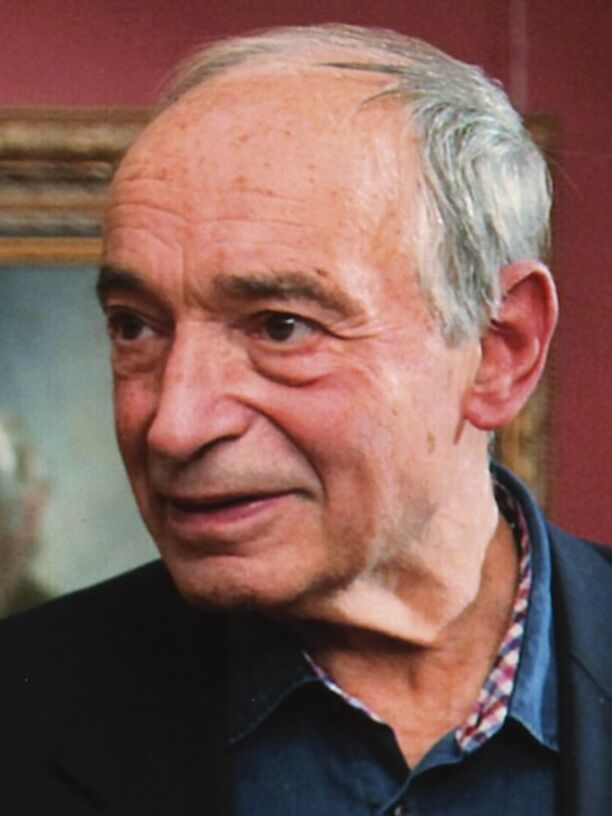
- Born: Valentin Iosifovich Gaft; 2 September 1935; Moscow, Russian SFSR, Soviet Union
- Died: 12 December 2020 (aged 85); Zhavoronki, Moscow Oblast, Russia
- Occupation: Actor
- Years active: 1956–2020
- Awards: Order of Friendship (1995)

Signature
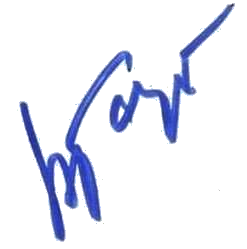

Valentin Iosifovich Gaft (Russian: Валенти́н Ио́сифович Гафт; 2 September 1935 – 12 December 2020) was a Soviet and Russian actor. He was a People's Artist of the RSFSR (1984).

== Biography ==
=== Early life and education ===
Gaft was born in Moscow to Jewish parents, Iosif Ruvimovich Gaft (1907–1969), a lawyer, and Gita Davydovna Gaft (1908–1993). He had a sister, Rima Iosifovna Gaft-Shtrom (1930–2021). The family moved to Moscow from Poltava, Ukraine or Pryluky, Ukraine. During World War II, Iosif Gaft served in the Red Army finishing with the rank of Major.

Gaft took a great interest in theater while in school and took part in the school theater amateur performance. He graduated from the School-Studio at the Moscow Art Theatre (1953–1957). Among the students of the same course were future popular actors Oleg Tabakov and Maya Menglet.

=== Theatre ===
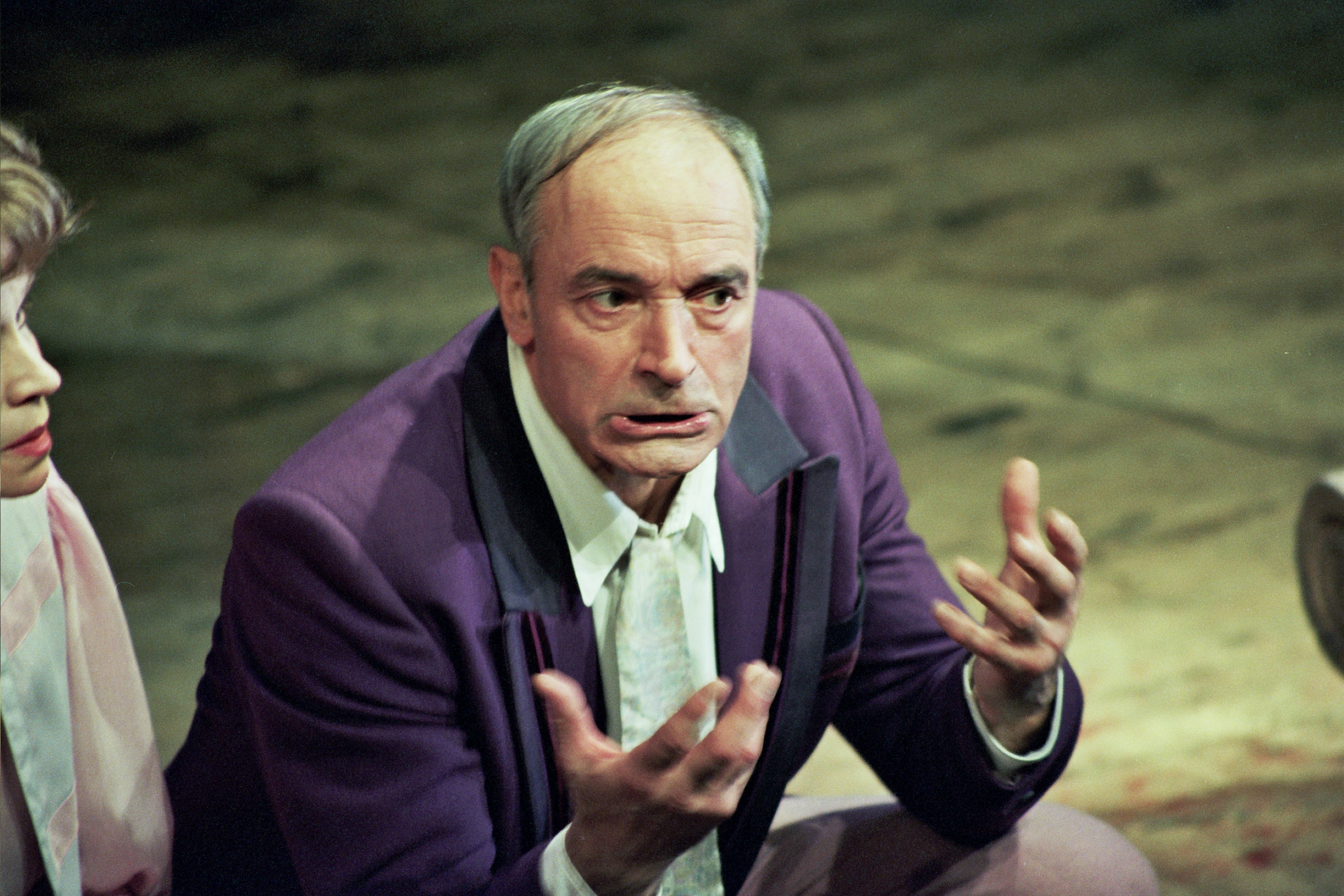
Gaft in a theatrical play

After graduating, Gaft worked for a number of theaters including the Mossovet Theatre, Lenkom Theatre (under famous director Anatoly Efros) and Theater of Satire. In 1969 he started to work for the Sovremennik Theatre and worked there until 2019.

=== Film ===
Gaft started his work for the cinema in 1956, in Mikhail Romm's film Murder on Dante Street.

Later he starred in the movies The First Courier (1968), Mad Gold (1977), Centaurs (1979), Black Hen, or Underground Villagers (1981), Fuete (1986). Prominent roles were played by Gaft in the musical comedy The Sorceress (1982), the tragicomedy Through Main Street with an Orchestra (1986), the action film Thieves in Law (1988), The Visit of the Lady (1989), Night Fun (1991), Encore, Once More Encore! (1992).

In 1994, Gaft played Woland in Yuri Kara's film The Master and Margarita, which was only released in 2011.

However, the real popularity came to Gaft only after cooperation with Eldar Ryazanov. In 1979, he played the chairman of the garage cooperative Sidorkin in the comedy The Garage, in 1980, starred in the tragicomedy Say a Word for the Poor Hussar, in 1987, starred in the movie Forgotten Melody for a Flute, and in 1991 in the film Promised Heaven.

In addition to theater and cinema, Gaft played many roles on television – the main character in the television series based on Thomas Mann's novel Buddenbrooks, Lopatin in Lopatin's Notes, Jasper in the four-part film Edin Druid's Secret, Kramin in the television movie For the Rest of His Life, Prince Borescu in the television show The Archipelago Lenoir, The Kid in Kings and Cabbage, Butler in the television film Hello, I'm Your Aunt! and others. Teleplays with Gaft's participation included Just a few words in honor of M. de Moliere, Widow's Home, Players, Aesop, and Who's Afraid of Virginia Woolf?

== Personal life ==
Gaft was married to the actress Olga Ostroumova from 1996 until his death. He was the author of sharp and popular epigrams against many theatrical and movie figures. In the 2013 film Yolki 3, he read some of his own poetry.

Gaft converted to Orthodox Christianity in 1990; his wife persuaded him to get baptized.

In 2015, to the Ukrainian internet publishing "Gordon", Valentin Gaft proudly announced that he was a Putinist.

In 2016, Gaft was banned from entering Ukraine, for "statements contradicted the interests of our national security".

Gaft died on 12 December 2020, in Moscow, at the age of 85.

== Selected filmography ==
- Murder on Dante Street (1956) as Marsel Ruzhe
- Russian Souvenir (1960) as Claude Gerard, French composer
- Intervention (1968) as Dlinnyy
- Family Happiness (1970) as Salesman
- That Sweet Word: Liberty! (1973) as Miguel Carrera (voice)
- Moscow, My Love (1974) as choreographer
- Ivan and Marya (1975) as Paymaster
- For the Rest of His Life (1975, TV Mini-Series) as Lt. Kramin
- Hello, I'm Your Aunt! (1975, TV Movie) as Brasset
- Story of an Unknown Actor (1977) as Znamensky
- Centaurs (1978) as Andres
- The Garage (1980) as Sidorin
- Dog in Boots (1981) as Lofty (voice)
- Say a Word for the Poor Hussar (1981, TV Movie) as colonel Ivan Pokrovsky
- Vertical Race (1982, TV Movie) as Lyokha Dedushkin
- Fuete (1987) as рoet
- Forgotten Melody for a Flute (1987) as Odinokov
- Through Main Street with an Orchestra (1987) as Konstantin Vinogradov
- Visit to Minotaur (1987, TV Mini-Series) as Pavel Ikonnikov
- The Life of Klim Samgin (1988, TV Series) as Valery Trifonov
- The Feasts of Belshazzar, or a Night with Stalin (1989) as Lavrentiy Beria
- The Suicide (1990) as entertainer
- Lost in Siberia (1991) as Beria
- Promised Heaven (1991) as Dmitry Loginov, “President“
- Encore, Once More Encore! (1992) as Fedor Vasilyevich Vinogradov
- The Master and Margarita (Мастер и Маргарита, 1994) as Woland
- Sympathy Seeker (1997) as Magician
- Old Hags (2000) as general Dubovitsky
- Tender Age (2000) as Saledon Sr.
- House for the Rich (2000) as Roman Rumyanov
- The Master and Margarita (2005) as Joseph Kaifa / NKVD general
- 12 (2007) as 4th juror
- The Book of Masters (2009) as magic mirror
- Attack on Leningrad (2009) as film director
- Burnt by the Sun 2 (2010) as Pimen
- The Life and Adventures of Mishka Yaponchik (2011, TV Series) as Mendel Gersh
- Wings (2012) as Byvaly (voice)
- Yolki 3 (2013) as Nikolai Petrovich

== Honors and awards ==
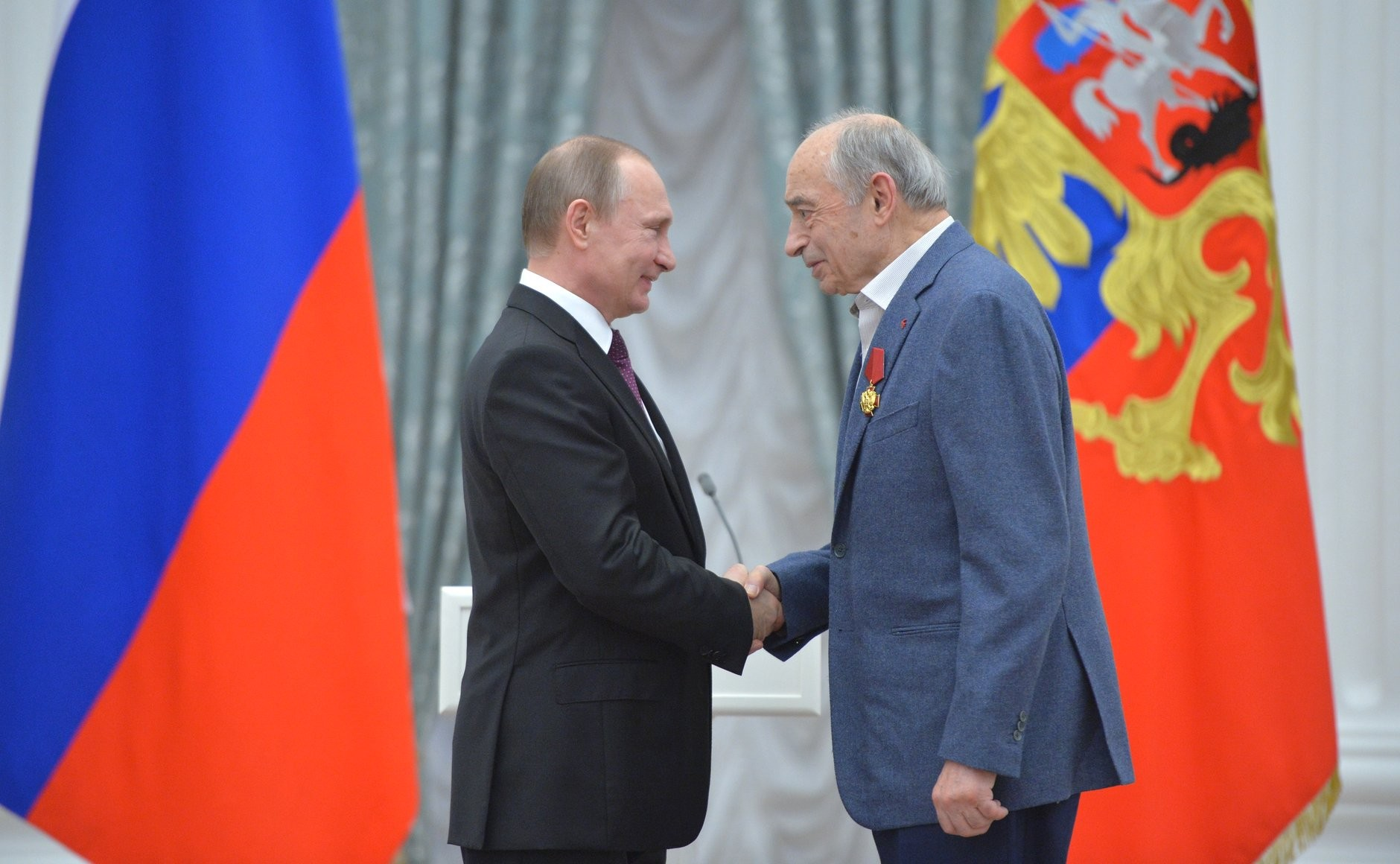
Gaft awarded with the Order "For Merit to the Fatherland" (4th class) by President Vladimir Putin on 10 March 2016

- Order "For Merit to the Fatherland":
  - 4th class (15 February 2016) – for outstanding contribution to the development of culture and many years of creative activity
  - 2nd class (2 September 2010) – for outstanding contribution to the development of domestic theatrical art and many years of creative activity
  - 3rd class (2 September 2005) – for outstanding contribution to the development of theatrical art, and many years of creative activity
- Order of Friendship (11 August 1995) – for services to the state and achievements in work and significant contribution to strengthening friendship and cooperation between nations
- Honored Artist of the RSFSR (1978)
- People's Artist of the RSFSR (1984)
