= Forgotten Melody for a Flute =

- Directed by: Eldar Ryazanov
- Written by: Emil Braginsky (play and screenplay); Eldar Ryazanov (play and screenplay)
- Produced by: Leonid Vereshchagin
- Starring: Leonid Filatov; Tatyana Dogileva; Irina Kupchenko; Valentin Gaft; Vsevolod Sanayev; Olga Volkova
- Music by: Andrey Petrov
- Release date: 1987
- Running time: 134 minutes
- Country: Soviet Union
- Language: Russian

Forgotten Melody for a Flute (Russian: Забытая мелодия для флейты, romanized: Zabytaya melodiya dlya fleyty) is a 1987 Soviet romantic comedy-drama film directed by Eldar Ryazanov. The film's plot is based on the stage play of the same name written by Ryazanov and Emil Braginsky.

A high-ranking bureaucrat, torn between ambition and newfound love, faces a life-altering crisis that forces him to confront his own hypocrisy and the emptiness of his privileged existence.

== Plot ==
Leonid Filimonov, a senior bureaucrat in the "Main Directorate of Free Time," is a man who constantly wrestles with his own duality, presenting himself as a liberal and supportive overseer of various arts and cultural groups while, in reality, routinely banning anything that hints at dissent. Filimonov lives comfortably, having married into a politically powerful family and built a career under the influence of his well-connected father-in-law. His life changes when he meets Lida, a courageous and creative nurse who plays in an amateur theater group he once censored. Lida, unimpressed by his privilege and insincerity, awakens in Filimonov a nostalgia for his youth as an idealistic musician, rekindling his buried desires for authenticity and love. Despite falling for Lida and beginning an affair, Filimonov remains torn, unable to leave his wife, who ultimately discovers his infidelity and throws him out. Seeking refuge, he moves in with Lida temporarily, though his deep-rooted tendency for dishonesty strains their relationship and jeopardizes his career ambitions as his separation from his influential wife threatens his upward trajectory.

When his estranged wife asks him to return, Filimonov, fearing career consequences, decides to leave Lida without a word. Heartbroken, she resigns, and on her last day, Filimonov officially steps into his new role as head of the Directorate. Gazing out the window as Lida walks away, he imagines renouncing his position to pursue an honest life with her, but instead, he begins his first official address as director. Suddenly, he suffers a heart attack, and in a vision of the afterlife, encounters people of various backgrounds and his own parents, who rebuke him for neglecting their graves. Lida, sensing something is wrong, rushes back and finds the paramedics ready to pronounce him dead; throwing herself on him, she begs him to live. Miraculously, Filimonov revives, yet, as he regains consciousness, it becomes clear there is no longer any place for Lida in his life.

== Cast ==
- Leonid Filatov as Leonid Filimonov
- Tatyana Dogileva as Lida
- Irina Kupchenko as Yelena
- Valentin Gaft as Odinokov
- Vsevolod Sanayev as Yaroslav Stepanovich
- Olga Volkova as Surova
- Sergei Artsibashev as Aleksey Akimovich
- Alexander Shirvindt as Myasoedov
- Elena Mayorova as Lusya, a policeman
- Vatslav Dvorzhetsky as Leonid Filimonov's father
- Elena Fadeeva as Leonid Filimonov's mother
- Aleksandr Pankratov-Chyorny as Sacha, actor
- Pyotr Merkuryev as conductor of female choir
- Eugene Voskresensky as Kirill, Surova's nephew
- Alexander Samoylenko as Sacha, Kirill's partner in crime
- Nina Agapova as Tatyana Georgievna, secretary
- Tatyana Gavrilova as actress, (Mayor's wife)
- Capitolina Ilienko as Capitolina Ivanovna
- Leonid Maryagin as Fedor Demyanovich, Filimonov's father in law
- Valery Pogoreltsev as director of amateur theatre
- Yuri Suchkov as actor (Khlestakov)
- Alexander Pyatkov as bureaucrat on the train
- Eldar Ryazanov as man with telescope
