= Olga Volkova (actress) =

Russian theatre and film actress (born 1939)

PAR Olga Volkova
- Ольга Волкова
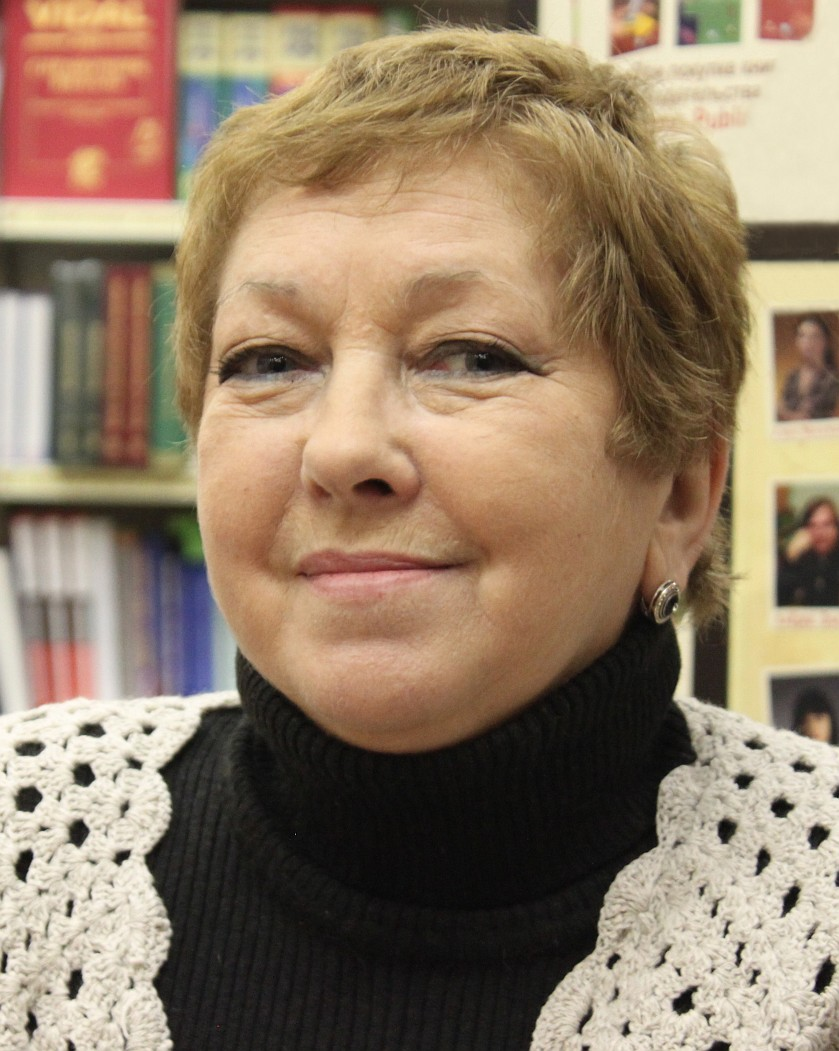
- Volkova in 2009
- Born: Olga Vladimirovna Politova; 15 April 1939 (age 87); Leningrad, Soviet Union
- Citizenship: Soviet (1939–1991); Russian (1991–present)
- Education: Bryantsev Youth Theatre acting studio
- Occupation: Actress
- Years active: 1962–present
- Notable work: Die Fledermaus (1979), I Ask to Accuse Klava K. of My Death (1979), Forgotten Melody for a Flute (1987), Promised Heaven (1991), Daddy's Daughters (2007)
- Awards: People's Artist of Russia; Honored Artist of the RSFSR; Golden Eagle Award

Olga Vladimirovna Volkova, PAR (née Politova, Russian: Ольга Владимировна Волкова née Политова; born 15 April 1939) is a Russian stage and film actress. She began her career at the Bryantsev Youth Theatre in Leningrad. She appeared in more than ninety films since 1962.

== Biography ==
Olga Volkova was born in Leningrad (now St. Petersburg), in a family of actors. In 1960 she graduated from the acting studio at the Leningrad Youth Theater.

From 1970 to 1976, she performed on the stage of the Leningrad Comedy Theatre, after which Olga joined the Bolshoi Drama Theater, where she remained until 1996.

She gained widespread cinematic recognition in the 1970s for her roles in the film operetta Die Fledermaus and the melodrama I Ask to Accuse Klava K. of My Death. A particularly significant aspect of Volkova's career was her collaboration with the filmmaker Eldar Ryazanov, in whose films she portrayed some of the most iconic roles of her career. Following minor parts in Ryazanov's Station for Two and A Cruel Romance, she was cast in leading roles in 1987's Forgotten Melody for a Flute and in 1991's Promised Heaven.

In 1996, Volkova moved to Moscow. Since then, she has worked primarily in private theatrical enterprises and on a contractual basis.

A new wave of popularity came to her in the late 2000s, thanks to her involvement in the sitcom Daddy's Daughters.

In 2020, she performed as an actress at the Theatre of Nations in the production The Taming of the Shrew.

== Selected filmography ==
- What Men Talk About. Continuation (2018) as Lyosha's mother
- Sherlock Holmes (2013) as Lady Emma Neligan
- Moms (2012) as Alexey's mother
- Ivanov (2010) as Avdotya Nazarovna
- Daddy's Daughters (2007—2013) as Antonina Semyonovna Gordienko, the sisters's maternal grandmother
- Still Waters (2000) as Varvara Petrovna Muromova, police detective
- Poor Sasha (1997) as Amalia Arkadyevna, Sasha's nanny
- Hello, Fools! (1996) as the ophthalmologist
- Devil, I'm Bored (1993) as the witch
- Promised Heaven (1991) as Katya Ivanova
- The Suicide (1990) as Raisa Filippovna
- To Kill a Dragon (1988) as the blacksmith's wife
- The Tale About the Painter in Love (1987) as the queen
- Forgotten Melody for a Flute (1987) as Surova
- Forgive Me (1986) as Lydia Mikhailovna Svirskaya
- TASS Is Authorized to Declare... (1984) as Emma Schanz
- And Then Came Bumbo... (1984) as the sister-in-law
- A Cruel Romance (1984) as the French milliner
- Applause, Applause... (1984) as Polina
- Station for Two (1983) as Violetta, the waitress
- Treasure Island (1982) as Mrs Hawkins, Jim's mother
- Solo (1980)
- Three Men in a Boat (1979)
- I Ask to Accuse Klava K. of My Death (1979) as Elena Grigorevna, kindergarten teacher
- Die Fledermaus (1979) as Lotta
- A Teacher of Singing (1972) as Mila's mother

== Awards ==
In 1993 Volkova received the People's Artist of Russia award. In 2002 won Golden Eagle Award for Best Supporting Actress for the film The Tale of Fedot-Sagittarius (Baba Yaga).
