= The Suicide (film) =

- Directed by: Valery Pendrakovsky
- Written by: Valery Pendrakovsky
- Produced by: Mark Rudinstein
- Starring: Sergey Shakurov; Leonid Kuravlyov; Aleksandr Trofimov
- Cinematography: Valentin Makarov
- Music by: Edison Denisov
- Production company: Mosfilm
- Distributed by: Mosfilm
- Release date: 1990
- Running time: 90 minutes
- Country: USSR
- Language: Russian

The Suicide (Russian: Самоубийца, romanized: Samoubiytsa) is a 1990 Soviet black comedy film directed by Valery Pendrakovsky, adaptation of the play of the same name by Nikolai Erdman.

== Plot ==
The story follows Semyon Semyonovich Podsekalnikov (Sergey Shakurov), an insignificant man who lives off his weary wife, Maria Lukyanovna (Irina Byakova). One night, while performing a “pantomime” about liver sausage, his wife wakes to find him missing and assumes he is attempting suicide. Their neighbor, Kalabushkin (Leonid Kuravlyov), demands that Semyon hand over a nonexistent weapon, only to later plant a revolver in Semyon's coat himself. The rumor of Semyon's impending suicide spreads quickly among the residents of their communal apartment building, who insist he kill himself for some noble cause. They even set a date and time for the event but cannot agree on a specific cause. On the day, those anticipating his death throw a lavish banquet, complete with a Romani band. Fueled by alcohol, Semyon gains temporary courage, even calling the Kremlin to express his disdain for Marx, claiming victory when the line cuts off. Yet, at the moment of his planned suicide, he loses his nerve. Hearing residents approach, he pretends to be dead, lying in a coffin while overhearing praises for his “sacrifice.” Eventually, he “resurrects,” deciding he no longer wants to die for anyone.

Infuriated, the residents, who feel cheated, demand compensation for the expenses or that he proceed with his original plan. Semyon, however, defiantly suggests that anyone else take his place instead, causing an uproar that forces him to flee from the outraged residents who chase him through Moscow. In a symbolic ending, Semyon runs through the streets of Moscow in 1990, passing newly legalized political demonstrations. Protesters from different movements, from democrats to nationalists, turn to reveal faces identical to Semyon's, suggesting he represents the “Podsekalnikov” within every person. The film is punctuated by musical numbers in which a master of ceremonies (Valentin Gaft) delivers satirical verses, adding a surreal tone to this darkly comic portrayal of societal pressures and individual despair.

== Cast ==
- Sergey Shakurov as Podsekalnikov
- Leonid Kuravlyov as Kalabushkin
- Aleksandr Trofimov as Aristarkh Dominikovich
- Vyacheslav Nevinny as Pugachyov
- Vladimir Menshov as Viktor Viktorovich
- Yelena Stepanenko as Cleopatra Maksimovna
- Olga Volkova as Raisa Filippovna
- Yelizaveta Nikishchina as Serafima Ilyinichna
- Igor Kashintsev as father Elpidy
- Gotlib Roninson as carver
- Valentin Gaft as entertainer

== Critical response ==
Film critic Alexander Fedorov noted:

Valery Pendrakovsky is not one of the elite of Russian directing, but having the classical dramaturgy of Nikolai Erdman as a literary basis and having collected a bouquet of famous actors, he quite convincingly created on the screen a phantasmagoric world of a universal communal apartment in which every creature lives in a couple.
