= Victor Buturlin =

Soviet and Russian filmmaker (1946–2022)

- Born: 28 June 1946; Moscow, Russian SFSR, Soviet Union
- Died: 5 February 2022 (aged 75); Saint Petersburg, Russia
- Occupations: Film director Screenwriter
- Years active: 1984–2022

Victor Ivanovich Buturlin (28 June 1946 – 5 February 2022) was a Russian film director and screenwriter. He died in Saint Petersburg on 5 February 2022, at the age of 75.

== Partial filmography ==
- Applause, Applause...
- The Gardener
