= Say a Word for the Poor Hussar =

- Directed by: Eldar Ryazanov
- Written by: Eldar Ryazanov; Grigori Gorin
- Produced by: Boris Krishtul
- Starring: Stanislav Sadalskiy; Oleg Basilashvili; Valentin Gaft; Yevgeny Leonov
- Narrated by: Andrei Mironov
- Cinematography: Vladimir Nakhabtsev
- Music by: Andrey Petrov
- Production company: Mosfilm
- Release date: January 1981
- Running time: 167 minutes
- Country: Soviet Union
- Language: Russian

Say a Word for the Poor Hussar (Russian: О бедном гусаре замолвите слово), translit. O bednom gusare zamolvite slovo. Literary “Put a good word for a poor hussar”) is a 1981 Soviet film directed by Eldar Ryazanov, shot in the style of a historical tragicomedy.

== Plot ==
A regiment of hussars arrives at the provincial town of Gubernsk for summer maneuvers. The hussars live a frivolous outside the barracks and away from the metropolitan authorities, enjoying evening shows in the theater, billiards, card games and flirting with the local women. But soon the regiment gets into trouble when Count Merzlyaev arrives from St. Petersburg on the personal orders of the Russian Emperor with a special mission.

Some officers of the hussars regiment are suspected of "free-thinking" and of conspiring against the government. Merzlyaev offers these officers a test: they must shoot a rebel, thus demonstrating their loyalty to the emperor. However, Merzlyaev's plan to test the officers' loyalty by an "execution by shooting" is a ruse: the cartridges are blank, and the role of "the condemned conspirator" will be played by a stranger. If the officers refuse to shoot they will face a military court and penal servitude.

For the role of the "conspirator" Merzlyaev hires Bubentsov, an actor who is in jail for stupid carelessness. Merzlyaev's ruse goes perfectly, but all of a sudden Cornet Alexei Pletnev, one of the officers who should carry out an execution, lets the "rebel" Bubentsov go free.

Merzlyaev is ready to take any action to save his plan and his reputation, to create any abomination, but is unable to defeat love and generosity of honest people...

== Cast ==
- Stanislav Sadalskiy as cornet Alexei V. Pletnev
- Oleg Basilashvili as count Merzlyaev, privy councilor from St Petersburg
- Yevgeny Leonov as Athanasios Bubentsov, provincial actor
- Irina Mazurkievich as Nastya Bubentsova, provincial actress, Bubentsov's daughter
- Valentin Gaft as colonel Ivan Pokrovsky, the commander of a cavalry regiment
- Georgi Burkov as Artyuhov, Merzlyaev's valet
- Zinovy Gerdt as Lev Pertsovsky, dealer parrots
- Victor Pavlov as jailer Stepan
- Boryslav Brondukov as 2nd jailer
- Vladimir Nosik as cornet Simpomponchik
- Valery Pogoreltsev as hussar Lytkin
- Nikolai Kochegarov as 2nd Hussar
- Alexey Shmarinov as 3rd Hussar
- Anatoliy Egorov as 4th Hussar
- Natalya Gundareva as Juju, milliner from the Madame Josephine's salon
- Svetlana Nemolyaeva as Zizi, milliner from the Madame Josephine's salon
- Liya Akhedzhakova as Lulu, milliner from the Madame Josephine's salon
- Valentina Talyzina as Anna Speshneva, provincial actress
- Grigory Shpigel as prompter
- Gotlib Roninson as Mark Mavzon, provincial actor
- Viktor Filippov as Theodore Spiridonov, provincial actor
- Alexander Belyavsky as governor
- Zoya Vasilkova as governor's wife
- Eldar Ryazanov as confectioner
- Andrei Mironov as narrator (voice)

== Music ==
The music for the film was written by the prominent Soviet composer Andrei Petrov, who had frequently worked with Eldar Ryazanov. The songs in the film were based on poems of famous Russian poets from different eras: Denis Davydov, Pyotr Vyazemsky, Mikhail Savoyarov, Marina Tsvetaeva, Mikhail Arkadyevich Svetlov. Later, an album of music based on the film was released, which was recorded with the participation of the USSR State Committee for Cinematography Orchestra (conductor Sergei Skripka) and the State Wind Orchestra of the RSFSR.

== Filming scandal ==
The film proved to be an ordeal for Eldar Ryazanov. The screenplay was written in the summer and autumn of 1978. The State Committee for Cinematography of the USSR did not accept the script, and Eldar Ryazanov brought it to Central Television of the USSR. After a long bureaucratic process the script was adopted into production by Studio Ekran. In autumn 1979 the movie was put into production in the cinematic studio Mosfilm. But soon came the decision that stunned Ryazanov - to shut down the film. In December 1979, Soviet troops entered Afghanistan and the Soviet censors saw the script of the film as a kind of "sedition". Initially, according to the creators, Merzlyaev was a Gendarme officer, but then, at the insistence of the TV authorities, any mention of that Russian "law enforcement agency" should be excluded from the screenplay. Screenplay authors Ryazanov and Gorin were surprised - "Soviet power" that toppled down "damned tsarism" in 1917, in 1979 struggled to protect one of the most hideous manifestations of "tsar's power" - "political police" represented in the movie by Gendarmes. Despite all his attempts to change the decision of TV authorities, Ryazanov could not do anything.

Then Ryazanov and Gorin made a decision to rewrite the script. The general meaning of the film was immediately distorted, the story developed numerous inconsistencies and logical absurdities. Merzlyaev became an indistinct official with special assignments. To emphasize his involvement in the secret services, he was awarded the rank of Actual Privy Councilor. Such rank, equal to that of the general, in the Russian Empire, could be held only by high-ranking officials of the ministerial level. It looked unlikely that an official of such rank would personally come to a provincial town and get engaged in petty intrigues.

Total control and censorship continued in the course of the filming. In his autobiography Ryazanov tells of flagrant cases of such intervention. For example, in one of the humorous episodes, actor Bubentsov (played by Yevgeny Leonov) was supposed to quote the famous poem by Lermontov: "Farewell, unwashed Russia!". TV bosses noticed the lines: "... And you, blue uniforms, and you, people faithful to them" and considered them as "seditious" hints at the Gendarmes. They ordered a replacement for the poem. Enraged Ryazanov, in vain, shouted in the face of the censors, that this Lermontov's poem is not an illegal literature and is learned by heart in every Soviet school. In the final version the actor Bubentsov quoted Pushkin's poem: "I sit behind bars in a damp prison ..."

Ryazanov, wrote in his book: Working over the film "Say a Word for the Poor Hussar" was not only a test for professionalism, it was a test for integrity, honesty and generosity. The content of the movie corresponded to our lives, to our work. The provocations, intrigues, infamies, that were described in our scenario, we had tested on ourselves while shooting the movie. Every scene that was planned to be shot tomorrow, as a rule, was remodel, refined, and appended the day before, which also increased the chaos and confusion on the film set. Perhaps "Say a Word for the Poor Hussar" was my most difficult work. Blows rained down on from all sides, from within and without.
