= The Irony of Fate 2 =

- «Ирония судьбы. Продолжение» (Russian)
- Directed by: Timur Bekmambetov
- Written by: Timur Bekmambetov; Aleksey Slapovsky
- Produced by: Anatoli Maksimov
- Starring: Konstantin Khabensky; Elizaveta Boyarskaya; Sergey Bezrukov; Andrey Myagkov; Barbara Brylska; Yuri Yakovlev
- Cinematography: Sergei Trofimov
- Edited by: Dmitry Kiselyov
- Music by: Yuri Poteyenko; Michael Tariverdiev
- Distributed by: Russia Channel One, Bazelevs Company and Mosfilm
- Release date: 21 December 2007
- Running time: 115 min.
- Country: Russia
- Language: Russian
- Budget: $5 million
- Box office: $55.6 million

The Irony of Fate 2 or The Irony of Fate: Continuation (Note: Russian: «Ирония судьбы. Продолжение», romanized: „Ironija sudjby. Prodolženije“, IPA: [ɪˈronʲɪjə sʊdʲˈbɨ ‖ prədɐɫˈʐɛnʲɪje]) is a 2007 Russian romantic comedy film directed by Timur Bekmambetov based on a screenplay by Aleksey Slapovsky produced by Channel One and released by Mosfilm. It is a direct sequel of the first The Irony of Fate.

It was originally rumored to be put in production in a press release, dedicated to the original movie's 30th anniversary in 2005.

The film grossed $55 million, with $50 million coming from the Russian box-office alone.

== Plot ==
The characters from the first film now have children who have managed to get into the same situation as their parents many years ago. However, the story is not simply a remake of the original movie. All of the adventures in the previous film were accidental, but here everything is done according to a plan thought up by Pavlik, a friend of Evgeniy Lukashin.

Pavlik's idea is to help his friend Evgeniy with his loneliness so he dispatches Lukashin's son to St. Petersburg, where he acts in the same manner as his father 30 years ago. In flat 12, he meets Nadezhda, who is actually the daughter of Nadezhda from the first film. She has a fiancé called Irakliy, a businessman. Konstantin's task is to lure Irakliy away from the flat and then wait for Nadezhda's mother to come; he then makes her call Evgeniy Lukashin. Pavlik persuades Evgeniy to go to St Petersburg.

The plot becomes a story of two fights over a woman: Konstantin vs. Irakliy and Evgeniy vs. Ippolit. In the end Lukashin overcomes the competition because Irakliy turns out to be too tedious for Nadya, and Nadezhda understands that she was never truly in love with Ippolit.

== Cast ==
=== Main cast ===
- Konstantin Khabensky as Kostya (the son of Zhenya and Galya)
- Elizaveta Boyarskaya as Nadya (the daughter of Ippolit and Nadezhda)
- Sergey Bezrukov as Irakliy Petrovich Izmaylov, Nadya's fiancé
- Andrey Myagkov as Evgeniy Mikhaylovich Lukashin (Zhenya)
- Barbara Brylska as Nadezhda Vasilyevna Sheveleva
- Yuri Yakovlev as Ippolit Georgievich, Nadezhda's ex-boyfriend

=== Supporting cast ===
- Mikhail Yefremov as Ded Moroz
- Yevgenia Dobrovolskaya as Snegurochka
- Valentina Talyzina as Valya, Nadezhda's best friend
- Alexander Schirvindt as Pavlik, Zhenya's friend
- Dato Bakhtadze as Artur, Nadya's neighbour
- Ramaz Chkhikvadze Jr. as Artur's son
- Sergei Rubeko as the man with the New Year tree
- Eldar Ryazanov as Kostya's seatmate in the plane (cameo role)
- Anna Semenovich as the woman at the airport
- Viktor Verzhbitsky as the mystery man at the bus stop
- Ville Haapasalo as the drunken Finn
- Roman Madyanov as Mamontov, the police officer
- Valery Barinov

== Production ==
Almost all of the lead actors from the first film appeared in the sequel, except for Georgi Burkov, Liya Akhedzhakova and Olga Naumenko.

Burkov died in 1990. Akhedzhakova refused to take part in the film. Naumenko agreed to the filming, but managed to be in only one episode. Later, her schedule did not coincide with the director's and further shooting did not take place which led to her being cut from the final version of the film.

Initially, Milla Jovovich was considered for the role of Nadya, but she read the script and refused. In an interview, Jovovich stated that she declined to appear in the film because she was apprehensive about acting in Russian, because her main language is English. However, four years later, she did act in Russian — in the 2011 film Lucky Trouble alongside Khabensky, also produced by Bekmambetov.

== Release ==
The film opened 21 December 2007 in Russia in 903 theatres, the widest opening in Russia at the time.

== Reception ==
The film received positive reviews from Film.ru, Time Out, KG, Kinomania and a number of other publications. At the same time, the film is often accused of intrusive advertising and targeting the box office, as well as an excessive number of special effects.

Online newspaper Lenta.ru praised the film's cast, humor and atmosphere but criticized the excessive product placement. Gazeta.ru wrote that the film, which the creators presented as an instant classic, is "steeped in boredom, contrivance and falsehood". Andrey Myagkov, although he took part in the filming, eventually expressed his regret and dissatisfaction with the final result.

The film grossed a record $35.7 million in its first two weeks of release and went on to gross $50 million in Russia and $55 million worldwide.

== Awards ==
The film received three prizes at the MTV Russia Movie Awards — Best Film, Best Actor (Sergei Bezrukov) and Best Comedy Actor (Konstantin Khabensky).
