= Through Main Street with an Orchestra =

- Directed by: Pyotr Todorovsky
- Written by: Alexander Buravsky; Pyotr Todorovsky
- Produced by: Vladimir Dudin
- Starring: Oleg Borisov; Lidiya Fedoseyeva-Shukshina; Marina Zudina; Valentin Gaft; Igor Kostolevsky; Valentina Telichkina
- Cinematography: Valery Shuvalov
- Music by: Pyotr Todorovsky
- Production company: Mosfilm
- Release date: 12 May 1986
- Running time: 94 minutes
- Country: Soviet Union
- Language: Russian

Through Main Street with an Orchestra (Russian: По главной улице с оркестром, romanized: Po glavnoy ulitse s orkestrom) is a 1986 Soviet musical film directed by Pyotr Todorovsky.

== Plot ==
50-year-old teacher Vasily Muravin is experiencing a middle-age crisis. He is replaced at work from his post as head of the department by a more pragmatic, but limited Valentin Romanovsky and his wife Lida earns more than him and habitually complains about his indecisiveness. Muravin finds it difficult to reconcile with peoples attitude towards him, but what makes him the most upset is his wife's disrespect towards his main hobby – guitar playing. One day unable to bear any more mockery he leaves his home. He plays for the public at the River Station and then decides not to return home or to work.

During one of his speeches to an idle public Muravin sees his daughter Ksenia. A new level of communication begins between them when they learn things about each other that they did notice during the time they lived together. Father helps Ksyusha to understand the situation with a married doctor Igor, from whom she is bearing a child (it later turns out to be a lie to make Igor stay with her).

Ksyusha tries to teach practicality to her father after she sees that the arranger Konstantin Mikhailovich brazenly appropriates the melodies which her father played on guitar.

For Muravin, what is more important is the existence of melodies and his own independence from the "artistic council".

== Cast ==
- Oleg Borisov as Vasily Pavlovich Muravin
- Lidiya Fedoseyeva-Shukshina as Lidiya Ivanovna, Muravin's wife
- Marina Zudina as Ksenia (Ksyusha), Muravin's daughter
- Valentin Gaft as Konstantin Mikhailovich Vinogradov, a music arranger
- Igor Kostolevsky as Igor, beloved Ksenia
- Valentina Telichkina as Zhenya, Igor's wife
- Oleg Menshikov as Fedor Korolykov, student Polytechnic University
- Lyudmila Maksakova as Alla
- Alexander Lazarev as Valentin Romanovsky, Head of Department
- Svetlana Nemolyaeva as Romanovskaya
- Sergey Zhigunov as Lieutenant Zhigunov, policeman
