= A Cruel Romance =

- Directed by: Eldar Ryazanov
- Screenplay by: Eldar Ryazanov
- Based on: Without a Dowry by Alexander Ostrovsky
- Starring: Larisa Guzeeva; Nikita Mikhalkov; Andrey Myagkov; Alisa Freindlich; Aleksei Petrenko; Viktor Proskurin
- Cinematography: Vadim Alisov
- Music by: Andrey Petrov
- Production company: Mosfilm
- Release date: 1984
- Running time: 142 minutes
- Country: Soviet Union
- Language: Russian

A Cruel Romance (Russian: Жестокий романс, romanized: Zhestokiy romans) is a 1984 Russian romantic drama directed by Eldar Ryazanov. It is based on Alexander Ostrovsky's classic play Without a Dowry (1878). which had earlier been adapted into a film in 1937. The main female role was played by Larisa Guzeyeva in her cinematic debut.

The film was shot on location in the Upper Volga region, including Kostroma. It features a set of Russian romances written by Bella Akhmadulina, Marina Tsvetaeva and Eldar Ryazanov, composed by Andrey Petrov and Nina Shatskaya and performed by Valentina Ponomaryova. These songs have gained widespread popularity in Russia.

== Plot ==
The film takes place in the fictional town of Bryakhimov on the banks of the Volga River in 1877–1878. The two episodes of the movie differ chronologically: the events shown in the first episode last for almost one year, whereas the second episode shows events of less than one day, and the culmination of the whole story takes place in the second episode.

The film depicts the widowed noblewoman Kharita Ignatyevna Ogudalova, who comes from a very respected family and is blessed with three marriageable daughters. She has sunk into poverty since her husband's death, but tries to do everything possible to improve the lives of her daughters, which means helping them to happily marry rich and noble men. Because of her lack of money, Ogudalova keeps her house open to strangers, hoping that the company of her three beautiful music-loving daughters will attract many single and rich men who could marry the girls.

=== Episode 1 ===
The film begins with Olga Dmitrievna Ogudalova's marriage to a prince from Tiflis. Her sister Anna has been married to a foreigner for some time and lives in Monte Carlo. However, it soon becomes clear that Anna's husband was caught cheating in cards, and Kharita Ignatyevna is forced to humble herself in order to get money to send to her daughter. "Dowerless" remains the youngest daughter Larisa, for whom the richest merchant in Bryakhimov, Mokiy Parmenovich Knurov, has amorous feelings. But he is aged and already married which makes him ineligible as a groom, nevertheless Kharita Ignatyevna uses his infatuation with her daughter to receive money and expensive gifts.

Another suitor is a young successful businessman and childhood friend of Larisa, Vasiliy Danilovich Vozhevatov, quite rich, but not quite enough to afford to marry a woman with no dowry. Yuliy Kapitonovich Karandyshev, postal employee and official, is constantly lingering around the main heroine. He loves Larisa, but at the same time he is foolish, poor, painfully selfish and completely uninteresting to the girl herself.

All these suitors are overshadowed by Sergei Sergeevich Paratov – a handsome, charming, dandy, frivolous and wealthy gentleman and shipowner. He flirts with Larisa, gives her expensive gifts and sails with her on his own steamboat. Paratov is clearly in love with Larisa and the feeling is mutual. It seems as though Sergei Sergeevich will ask for her hand in marriage, but then he unexpectedly hurries away from the city – to save his fortune, he says, which was squandered by unscrupulous stewards. Paratov does not find time to say goodbye to Larisa and simply disappears.

Upon learning that he is setting forth, she rushes to the railway station, but is not on time for the train's departure. For several months there is no news from Paratov and Larisa is heartbroken from the loss of her love. Having lost hope for such a successful match, Kharita Ignatyevna continues to organize evenings hoping to find a husband for Larisa. But one day Gulyaev, who is yet another rich candidate for the role of a groom, is arrested in the house of the Ogudalovs, it turns out that he is not a Moscow banker, but a bank cashier who escaped with money. The scandal drives away the remaining suitors from the house.

Kharita Ignatyevna is constantly trying to persuade her daughter to choose a groom, because with time the chances for a successful party will only decrease. Once Larisa, in response to another request from her mother, says that she will accept a marriage offer from the first man who will propose, and Karandyshev turns out to be the one. Preparation begins for the wedding, but Karandyshev immediately shows his petty and vain character. Kharita Ignatyevna warns her daughter against doing anything hasty, but the latter is firm in her intention, although she does not hide from the groom that she does not love him and agreed to marriage only from despair.

Unexpectedly, Paratov returns to the city. He still leads a lavish lifestyle, but in fact, his finances have deteriorated: he sells Vozhevatov his steamer and is about to marry a rich bride for money.

From Knurov and Vozhevatov, Paratov learns that Larisa is going to marry Karandyshev, and about the upcoming dinner with the groom. This obviously hurts Paratov's pride, but aloud he only expresses his best wishes to the bride.

=== Episode 2 ===
Larisa asks Karandyshev to leave as soon as possible for his estate, but he insists on a lavish wedding in Bryakhimov and arranges a celebratory dinner. Paratov goes to the Ogudalovs, where he meets Larisa who confesses that she still has feelings for him. Karandyshev appears, dissatisfied with the visit of his rival.

The dinner goes terribly wrong: with the help of Paratov's friend, drunkard Arkady Schastlivtsev (aka Robinson), the groom gets heavily inebriated and embarrasses himself.

Ashamed of what is happening, Larisa leaves the table. Paratov, who hid his forthcoming marriage from the Ogudalovs, tells Larisa about his love, about his readiness to leave everything for her and invites her on the steamer "Swallow", where Vozhevatov will give a banquet in honor of his acquisition.

Karandyshev returns and understands that a joke was played on him. Despite attempts of her aunt and Kharita Ignatyevna to stop him, he rushes in pursuit, taking with him a loaded pistol, but does not have time to board the steamer and ends up following it by boat. On the "Swallow", after a merry banquet with gypsy songs and dances, Larisa and Paratov go to the cabin and spend the night together. In the morning, he advises Larisa to return home. Larisa is shocked, she believes that after what happened between them, Paratov must bring her back himself and ask for her hand in marriage. But he says that he can not marry Larisa, since he is already engaged to another woman. Larisa understands that she was used, and is in a state of shock.

Knurov and Vozhevatov decide that it is possible to use the situation to invite Larisa for a trip abroad (both are going to visit the exhibition in Paris). In order not to have competition, they flip a coin as to who will invite Larisa to Paris: Knurov wins, and Vozhevatov promises that he will leave Larisa alone.

When Larisa turns to Vozhevatov for support, he categorically refuses to help her. Knurov, offers Larisa to become his kept woman. He says that he can not make her a marriage proposal because he is already married, but he promises to provide her with a life-long fortune.

Karandyshev, in the morning catches up with the "Swallow", climbs aboard, and witnesses the agreement of the merchants. Then he finds the bride and implores her to return home. In response, Larisa declares that she is going to agree to Knurov's offer. Karandyshev tries to stop Larisa by force, but she breaks away and leaves. Karandyshev goes mad and shoots Larisa. Knurov, Paratov and Vozhevatov observe with horror what is happening from the cabin, unable to do anything. Mortally wounded, Larisa falls on the deck and dies.

== Cast ==
- Larisa Guzeyeva as Larisa Ogudalova (dubbing by Anna Kamenkova, singing by Valentina Ponomaryova)
- Nikita Mikhalkov as Sergei Paratov
- Andrey Myagkov as Yuli Karandyshev
- Alisa Freindlich as Kharita Ogudalova
- Aleksei Petrenko as Mokiy Knurov
- Viktor Proskurin as Vasiliy Vozhevatov
- Georgy Burkov as Arkady Schastlivtsev
- Borislav Brondukov as Ivan
- Alexander Pyatkov as Gavrilo
- Yuri Sarantsev as Mikhin
- Olga Volkova as French milliner
