= Aleksandr Shirvindt =

Soviet and Russian actor (1934–2024)

- Александр Ширвиндт
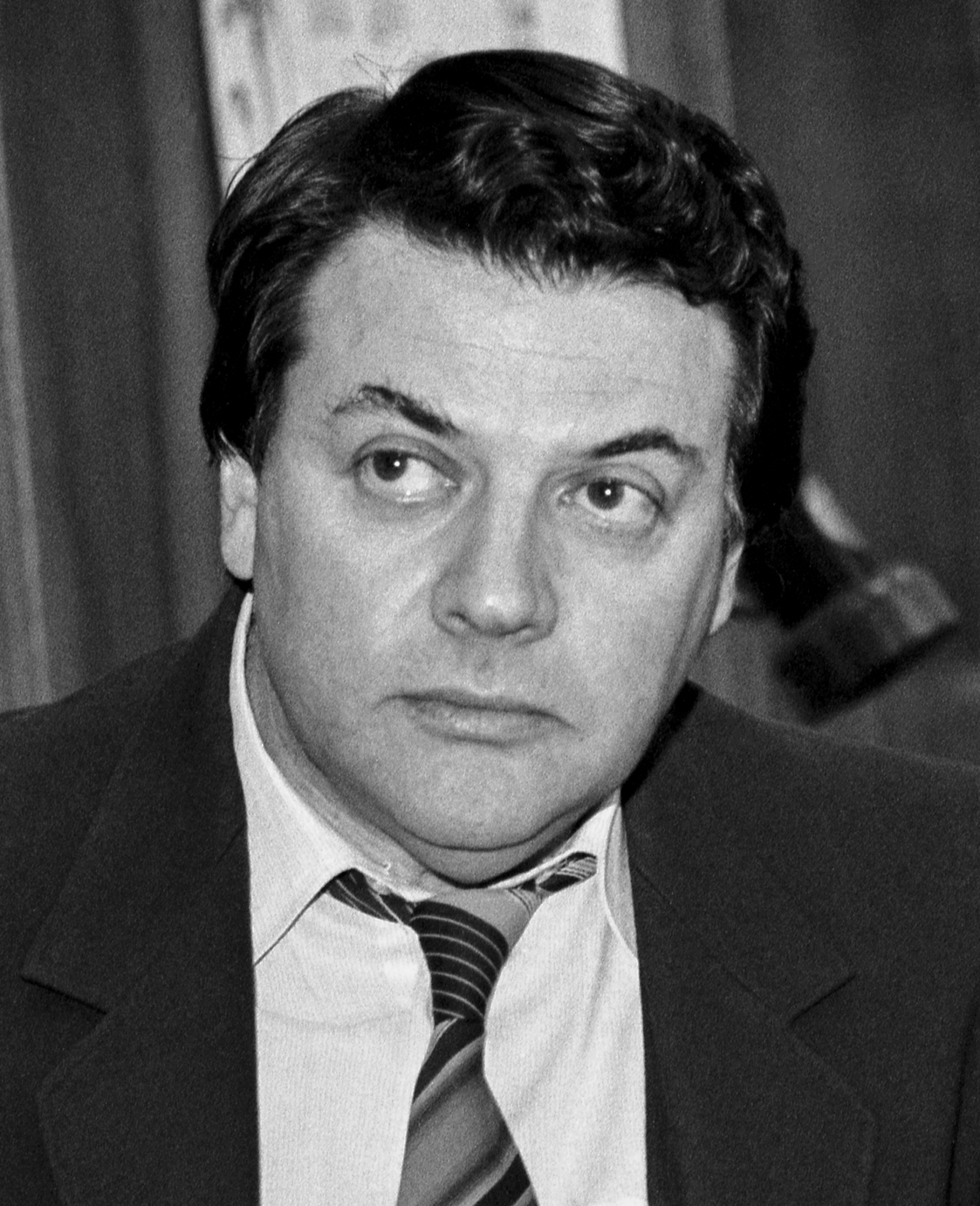
- Shirvindt in 1986
- Born: Aleksandr Anatolyevich Shirvindt; 19 July 1934; Moscow, Russian SFSR, USSR
- Died: 15 March 2024 (aged 89); Moscow, Russia
- Occupations: Actor, director
- Years active: 1952–2018
- Awards: People's Artist of the RSFSR
- Aleksandr Shirvindt's voice recorded September 2004

Aleksandr Anatolyevich Shirvindt (Russian: Александр Анатольевич Ширвиндт, 19 July 1934 – 15 March 2024) was a Soviet and Russian stage and film actor, educator, screenwriter and voice actor, People's Artist of the RSFSR (1989). In 2000, he became a theatre director of Moscow Satire Theatre.

== Biography ==
Aleksandr Shirvindt was born in Moscow in a family of a violinist and music teacher Anatoly Gustavovich Shirvindt (1896–1962) and Raisa Samoilovna Shirvindt (1898–1985) of Moscow Philharmonic Society. Grandfather, Gustav (Gedaliah) Moiseyevich Shirvindt (a graduate of Vilnius 1st Gymnasium in 1881), was a doctor.

In 1956 Shirvindt graduated from Boris Shchukin Theatre Institute. The same year he made his cinema debut in She Loves You! (1956). In 1957, he became an actor at the Lenkom Theatre. He also appeared on stage as part of a comedy duo with Mikhail Derzhavin from 1957 to 2017.

Shirvindt appeared in more than 40 films, including Grandads-Robbers (1971), The Irony of Fate (1976), The Twelve Chairs (1976), Three Men in a Boat (1979), Station for Two (1982), The Irony of Fate 2 (2007). He voiced Aramis in Dog in Boots film.

Shirvindt died on 15 March 2024, at the age of 89.

Aleksandr Shirvindt was posthumously awarded the national cinematographic award "Nika" in the nomination "Honor and Dignity". This was announced by actor Leonid Yarmolnik July 1, 2024 during the awards ceremony, held on the stage of the theater "Mask". The actor added that the Nika award council decided to award Shirvindt two years ago.

== Filmography ==
actor

- Come Tomorrow, Please... (Приходите завтра..., 1963) as Vadim
- Major Whirlwind (Майор "Вихрь", 1967) as Jozef
- Grandads-Robbers (Старики-разбойники, 1971) as spokesman of the minister
- The Irony of Fate (Ирония судьбы, или С лёгким паром!, 1975) as Pavlik
- The Twelve Chairs (Двенадцать стульев, 1976) as one-eyed chess player
- Heavenly Swallows (Небесные ласточки, 1976) as Château-Gibus
- Three Men in a Boat (Трое в лодке, не считая собаки, 1979) as Sir Samuel William Harris
- Incognito from St. Petersburg (Инкогнито из Петербурга, 1977) as district doctor
- Borrowing Matchsticks (1980) as narrator
- Station for Two (Вокзал для двоих, 1982) as Shurik, pianist
- The Circus Princess (Принцесса цирка, 1982) as Firelli, director of the circus
- Simply Awful! (Просто ужас!, 1982) as Chief Physician
- The Most Charming and Attractive (Самая обаятельная и привлекательная, 1985) as Arkady
- Winter Evening in Gagra (Зимний вечер в Гаграх, 1985) as presenter
- Forgotten Melody for a Flute (Забытая мелодия для флейты, 1987) as Myasoedov
- Hello, Fools! (Привет, дуралеи!, 1996) as leader of the Social-Socialist party
- The Irony of Fate 2 (Ирония Судьбы. Продолжение, 2007) as uncle Pasha
- The Return of the Musketeers, or The Treasures of Cardinal Mazarin (Возвращение мушкетёров, или Сокровища кардинала Мазарини, 2009) as Jean-Baptiste Colbert

voice

- The Time Machine (1967) as narrator
- Bayadere (1973) as Storyteller
- Like Mushrooms with Рeas Fought (1977) as King Peas
- New Aladdin (Новый Аладдин, 1979) as Aladdin
- Alice in Wonderland (Алиса в Стране чудес, 1981) as Cheshire Cat
- Dog in Boots (Пёс в сапогах, 1981) as Pretty Boy
- The Smallest Dwarf (1981) as Goat
- There was Saushkin (1981) as uncle Kapa, a resident of Country Dobryakov
- My Grandmother and I (2002) as grandson Borya
- Alice in Wonderland (2010) as Cheshire Cat (Russian dub)
- Hoffmaniada (2018) as Lindhorst / Salamander

== Honours and awards ==
- Order "For Merit to the Fatherland";
  - 1st class (29 May 2019)
  - 2nd class (19 July 2009) – for outstanding contribution to the development of domestic theatrical art and many years of teaching activity
  - 3rd class (21 July 2014)
  - 4th class (2 August 2004) – for outstanding contribution to the development of theatrical art
- Order of Friendship of Peoples (20 June 1994) – for services to the development of theatrical art, and effective pedagogical activity
- Medal "Veteran of Labour" (USSR)
- Honored Artist of the RSFSR (1974)
- People's Artist of the RSFSR (1989)
- Winner of second prize at the Festival of the Arts' Theatre Spring-74 "Laureate of the "Golden Ostap" (1993, for participation in the play "Celebration")
- Chekhov's Medal (2010)
- Badge of Honour "Public Recognition"
- Invited to the jury League of KVN
- In 2003, asteroid 6767 Shirvindt was named in his honor.

In 2018 he was awarded the Fiddler on the Roof Award in the Legendary Person category.
