= Igor Kostolevsky =

Russian movie and stage actor (born 1948)

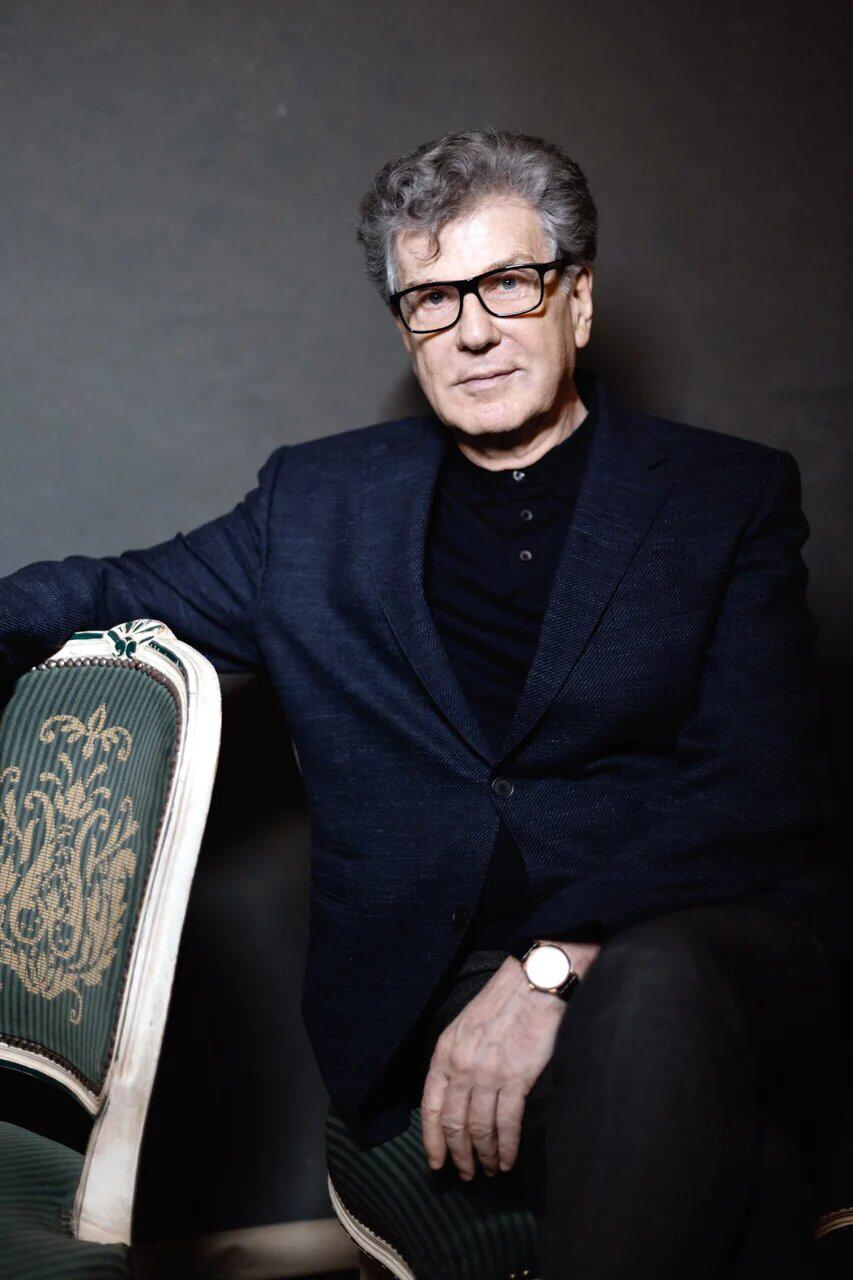
- Born: Igor Matveyevich Kostolevsky; 10 September 1948 (age 78); Moscow, RSFSR, Soviet Union
- Occupation: Actor
- Years active: 1970–present
- Spouses: Elena Romanova; Consuelo de Aviland
- Children: 1

Igor Matveyevich Kostolevsky (Russian: Игорь Матвеевич Костолевский; born 10 September 1948) is a Soviet and Russian stage and film actor. He has received the People's Artist of Russia title in 1995. Kostolevsky is best known for starring in the films Teheran 43 and The Captivating Star of Happiness.

== Biography ==
=== Early life and career ===
Igor Kostolevsky was born September 10, 1948, in Moscow, the son of Matvey Matveyevich Kostolevsky and Vitta Semyonovna Kostolevskaya. His family is Jewish.

After graduation he worked as a tester at the Research Institute of Quartz Industry for two years.

In 1967-1968 he studied at the Moscow Construction Institute.

In 1973 he graduated from GITIS, the course of Andrei Goncharov. In the same year he entered the troupe of the Mayakovsky Theatre.

Igor Kostolevsky played more than 50 roles in the theater, including Misha Rumyantsev ("Relatives" of Emil Braginsky and Eldar Ryazanov), Metchik ("The rout" of Alexander Fadeyev), Treplev ("The Seagull" Anton Chekhov), Golubkov ("Running" Mikhail Bulgakov), Barber King ("Look who came!" Vladimir Arro), Valery ("Man in his place" Valentina Chernykh), Pigusov ("Flying birds" by Alexander Galina), Vasily Leonidovich ("Fruits of Enlightenment" by Leo Tolstoy), Torvald Helmer ("The Dollhouse" by Henrik Ibsen) and others.

Since the 1990s, he has also played on the stages of other theaters, took part in the performance of the international troupe Oresteia Aeschylus, staged in Bergen, Norway, by the director Roche (roles of Apollo, Messenger and the Old Man). In 1994, Kostolevsky played Apollo in "Oresteia" staged by Peter Stein at the Russian Army Theatre.

=== Film career ===
In his student years, Igor Kostolevsky began to act in films. He made his debut in Boris Nirenburg's drama The Family as a Family, where the main roles were performed by the then popular actors of the Vakhtangov Theatre Lyudmila Tselikovskaya and Alexander Grave.

In 1975, Vladimir Motyl's film The Captivating Star of Happiness was released where Kostolevsky starred as Ivan Annenkov. The picture was a great success with the audience.

The critics rated the actor highly in the films Spring Appeal (1976) directed by Pavel Lyubimov and Asya (1977) by Joseph Kheifits. Then followed the work in the multi-part film And It's All About Him ... based on the novel by Vilya Lipatov, for the main role in which the actor received the Lenin Komsomol Prize.

Among other significant works Kostolevsky in the cinema in the 1970s was the role of the teacher of astronomy Marina Mioryu in the melodrama of Mikhail Kozakov's Nameless Star and one of the shareholders of the cooperative in the comedy Eldar Ryazanov The Garage. The actor received popularity for the role of Soviet scout Andrei Borodin in the film.

Igor Kostolevsky played more than 60 roles in the cinema. He starred in the films The Dawns Here Are Quiet (1972), A Man Changes Skin (1978), Leave at Your Own Cost (1981), The Tony Wendis Error (1981), Companions (1983) Before Parting (1984), Night Whispers (1985), Through Main Street with an Orchestra (1986), Gobsek (1987), Entrance to the Labyrinth (1989), Lust for Passion (1991), The Ladder of Light (1992), Tango on Palace Square (1993), Nimbus (1994), Square (1995), Another Woman, Another Man (2003), Spy Games (2004-2008), War and Peace (2007), The Time of Happiness (2008), The Blue as the Sea of Eyes (2009), The Tower (2010), and others.

=== Personal life ===
Igor Kostolevsky's first wife was actress Elena Romanova. Their son Alexey was born in 1983. The second wife of Igor Kostolevsky is the French actress Consuelo de Aviland.

=== Honors ===
Igor Kostolevsky received the title People's Artist of the Russian Federation in 1995.

Laureate of the Lenin Komsomol Prize (1978), laureate of the State Prize of Russia (2000), holder of the Order of Honor (2004), awarded the Order of Merit for the Fatherland, IV Degree (2009).

He was chosen as best actor of 1986 in the poll of the magazine Soviet Screen.

== Filmography ==
Year	Title	Role	Notes
1972	The Dawns Here Are Quiet	Misha, abiturient	
1975	The Captivating Star of Happiness	Annenkov	
1976	A Repeat Wedding	Vasya Kovalyov	
1977	Stepan's Remembrance	Vasiliy Turchaninov	
1978	Asya	Gaguine (Gagin)	
1978	Nameless Star	Alik Polukhin	
1980	The Garage	Miloserdov's Son	
1980	Tony Wendis's Mistake	Tony Wendis	
1981	Teheran 43	Andre Ilytch	
1981	A Tale Told at Night	Student	
1984	Before We Break Up	Yuriy Aleksandrovich	
1985	Legal Marriage	Igor Voloshin	
1986	Forgive Me	Kirill	
1986	Night Whispers	Alexandras	
1987	Through Main Street with an Orchestra	Igor	
1987	Gobseck	Count Maxime de Trailles	
1988	The Jester	Igor Alexandrovich	
1990	Entrance to the Labyrinth	Muromtsev	TV Mini-Series
1990	The Eternal Husband	Velchaninov	
1991	Thirst for Рassion	The Doctor	
1992	The Ladder of Light	Misha	
1993	Breakfast with a View to the Elbrus Mountains	Denisov	TV Film
1993	Tango on the Palace Square	Aleksandr	
1993	The Code of Dishonor	Sergei Rebrov	
1995	A Game of Imagination	Antoshin	
2001	La bella di Mosca	Vladimir	
2007	War and Peace	Alexander I of Russia	4 episodes
2010	Eyes as Blue as the Sea	Kosta	
2020	Trigger	Streletsky	TV series
2021	The Silver Wolf	Volkov	TV series
