= Emil Braginsky =

- Эмиль Брагинский
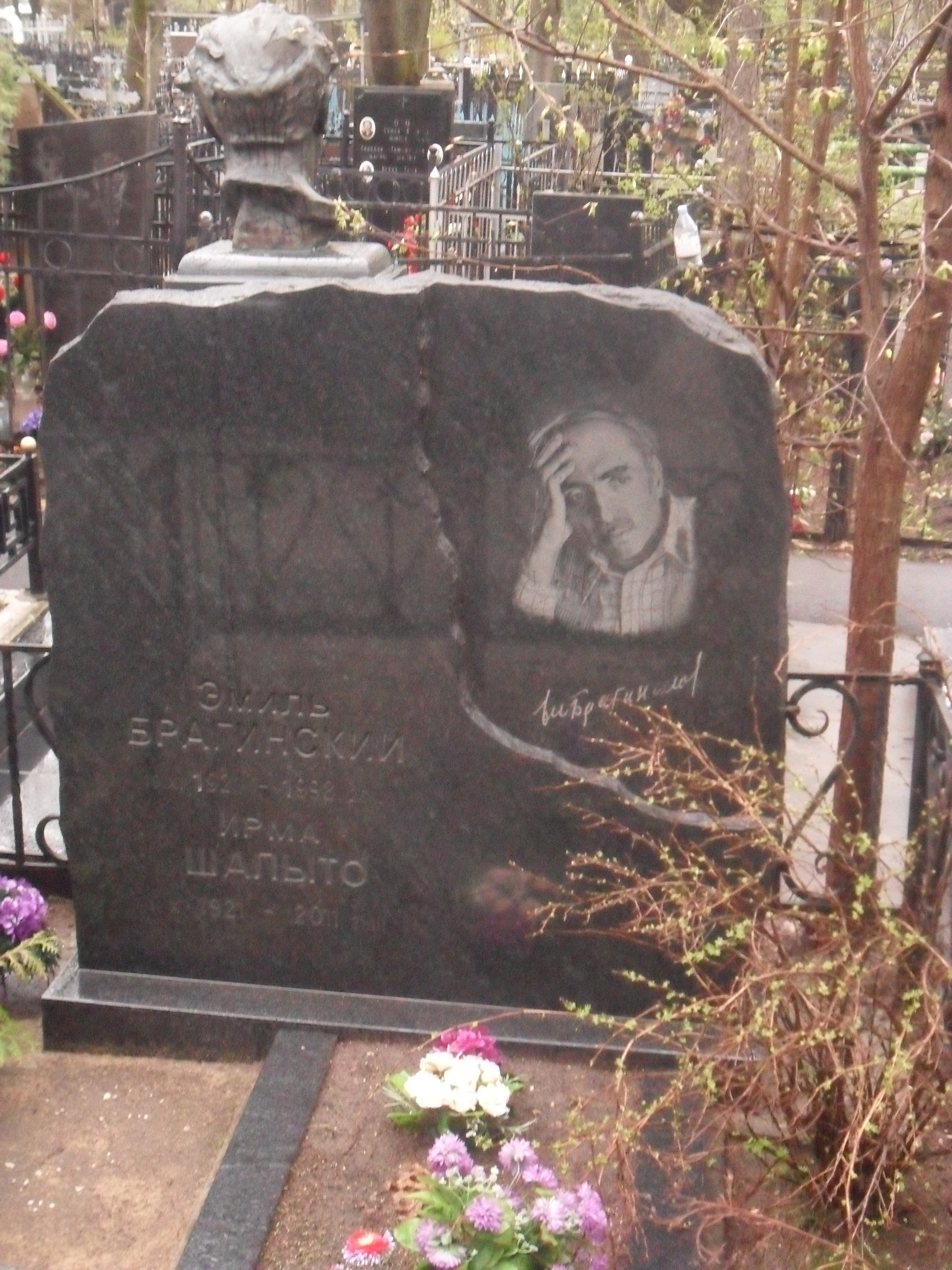
- Gravestone at the Vagankovo Cemetery
- Born: Emmanuel Veniaminovich Braginsky; 19 November 1921; Moscow, Russian SFSR
- Died: 26 May 1998 (aged 76); Moscow, Russia
- Years active: 1955–1996
- Spouse: Irma Braginskaya

Emil (Emmanuel) Veniaminovich Braginsky (Russian: Эми́ль (Эммануэль) Вениами́нович Браги́нский; 19 November 1921 – 26 May 1998) was a Soviet and Russian screenwriter. Honored Worker of the Arts of the RSFSR (1976) and recipient of the USSR State Prize (1977).

== Biography ==
Braginsky was born in Moscow on 19 November 1921. In 1953, he graduated from Kutafin Moscow State Law University

As a scriptwriter, he made his debut in the 1955 film Squared 45. From 1963 onward, Braginsky worked in a creative collaboration with Eldar Ryazanov. Their first joint work was the 1966 comedy film Beware of the Car.

== Filmography ==
- Squared 45 (1955)
- Vasily Surikov (1959)
- Absolutely Seriously (1961) (segment Istoriya s pirozhkami)
- Beware of the Car (1966)
- Malenkiy beglets (1966)
- When Rain And Wind Knock at the Window (1968)
- Zigzag udachi (1968)
- Stariki-razboyniki (1971)
- Uchitel peniya (1972)
- Chelovek s drugoy storony (1972)
- Unbelievable Adventures of Italians in Russia (1974)
- Shag navstrechu (1975)
- The Irony of Fate (1975)
- Office Romance (1977)
- Pochti smeshnaya istoriya (1977)
- Suyeta suyet (1978)
- The Garage (1979)
- Station for Two (1982)
- Nezhdanno-negadanno (1983)
- Poyezdki na starom avtomobile (1985)
- Khochu tebe skazat (1985)
- Artistka iz Gribova (1988)
- Zabytaya melodiya dlya fleyty (1988)
- Lyubov s privilegiyami (1989)
- A vot i ya (1993)
- Vorovka (1995)
- Moskovskiye kanikuly (1995)
- Igra voobrazheniya (1995)
- The Irony of Fate 2 (2007)

== Plays ==
- Sosluzhivtsy
- Pochti smeshnaya istoriya
- Amoral'naya istoriya
- Igra voobrazheniya
