= Irina Kupchenko =

Soviet and Russian actress

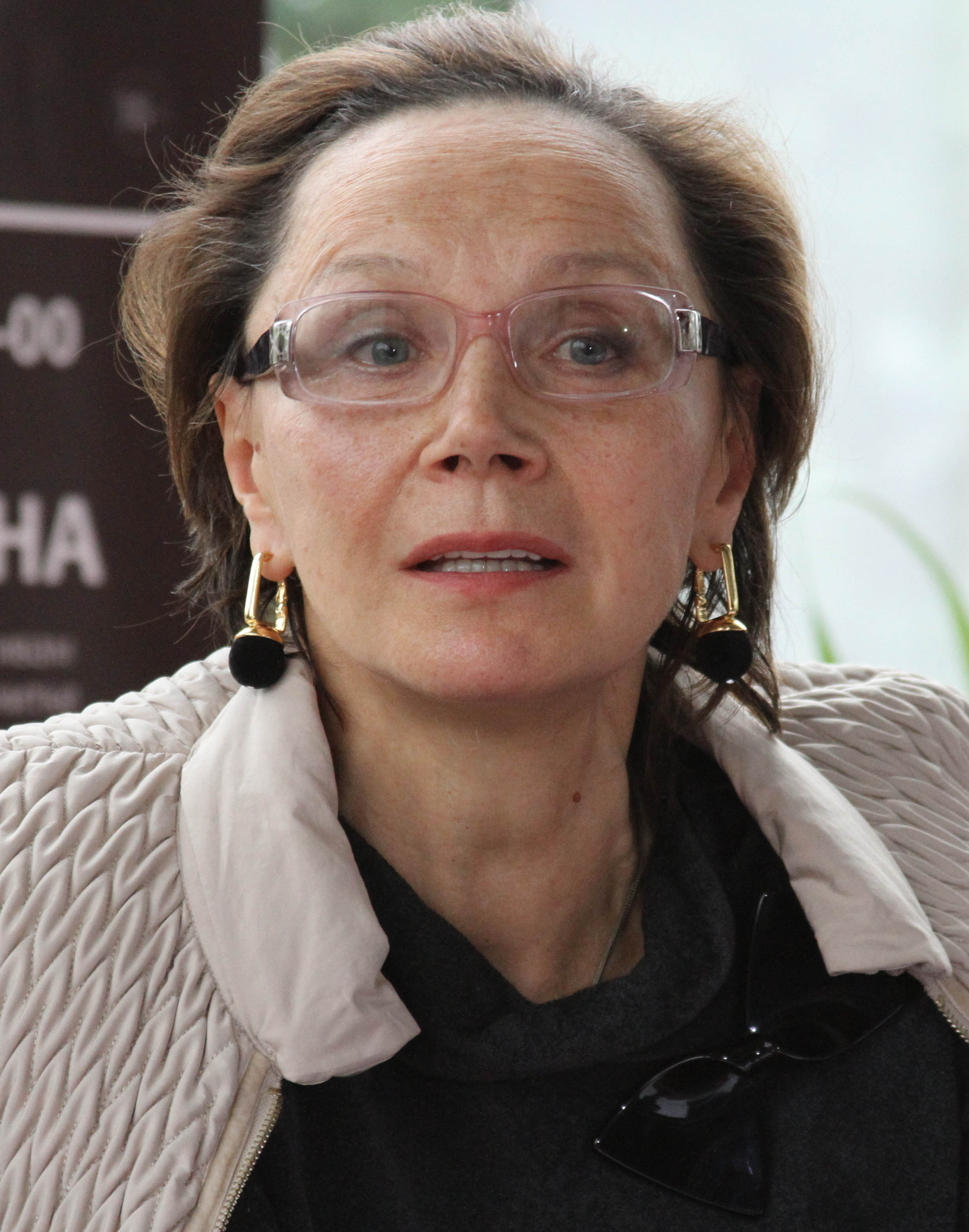
- Irina Kupchenko in 2017
- Born: Irina Petrovna Kupchenko; March 1, 1948 (age 78); Vienna, Austria
- Occupation: Actress
- Years active: 1969–present

Irina Petrovna Kupchenko (Russian: Ирина Петровна Купченко; born 1 March 1948 in Vienna) is a Soviet and Russian stage and film actress. She rose to prominence after acting in Andrei Konchalovsky's 1969 movie adaptation of A Nest of Gentry. She has performed in more than forty films since 1969.

Her performance in Lonely Woman Seeks Life Companion won her a Best Actress award at the Montreal World Film Festival.

She also played Alexandre in The Last Night of the Last Tsar, a play that was based on the book The Last Tsar: The Life and Death of Nicholas II by Edvard Radzinsky.

== Biography ==
She was born in Vienna in a military family that, after the withdrawal of the Soviet Army in Austria (1955), moved to Kyiv. In childhood, Irina showed an interest in ballet. After high school, she initially studied foreign languages at the University of Kyiv, but after her debut in the role of Liza in A Nest of Gentlefolk, she decided to pursue a career in acting. She graduated from the Shchukin Theatre Institute in Moscow (1970) and began working in the Moscow Vakhtangov Theatre (1971).

=== Personal life ===
She was married to actor Vasily Lanovoy until his death in 2021.

== Honors and awards ==
- Honored Artist of the RSFSR (1980)
- Lenin Komsomol Prize (1981)
- People's Artist of the RSFSR (1989)
- Order of Honour (1999)
- State Prize of the Russian Federation (2002)
- Order of Friendship (2019)

== Selected filmography ==
Fil
Year	Title	Role	Notes
2010	The Devil's Flower	Polina's mother	
2004	Moscow Saga	Mayka's mother	
2004	The Night is Bright	Zinaida Antonovna	
2001	Come Look at Me	Tatyana	
2000	Old Hags	Anna	
1991	The Inner Circle	Directress	
1990	Nikolai Vavilov (Николай Вавилов)	Lena	
1988	Forgotten Melody for a Flute	Yelena	
1987	A Lonely Woman Looking for a Companion	Klavdia	
1983	Without Witness	She	
1981	The Hound of the Baskervilles	Beryl Stapleton	
1979	September Vacation	Galina	
1978	An Ordinary Miracle	Wizard's wife	
1977	A Strange Woman	Yevgeniya Mihaylovna	
1975	The Captivating Star of Happiness	Trubetskaya	
1974	A Lover's Romance	Lyuda	
1971	Uncle Vanya (Дядя Ваня)	Sonya	
1969	A Nest of Gentry	Liza	
