= Yaroslav Smelyakov =

Russian Soviet poet, critic and translator

- Born: 8 January 1913; Lutsk, Volhynia Governorate, Russian Empire
- Died: 27 November 1972 (aged 59); Moscow, Soviet Union
- Occupations: Poet, translator, literary critic
- Writing career
- Years active: 1931–1972

Signature
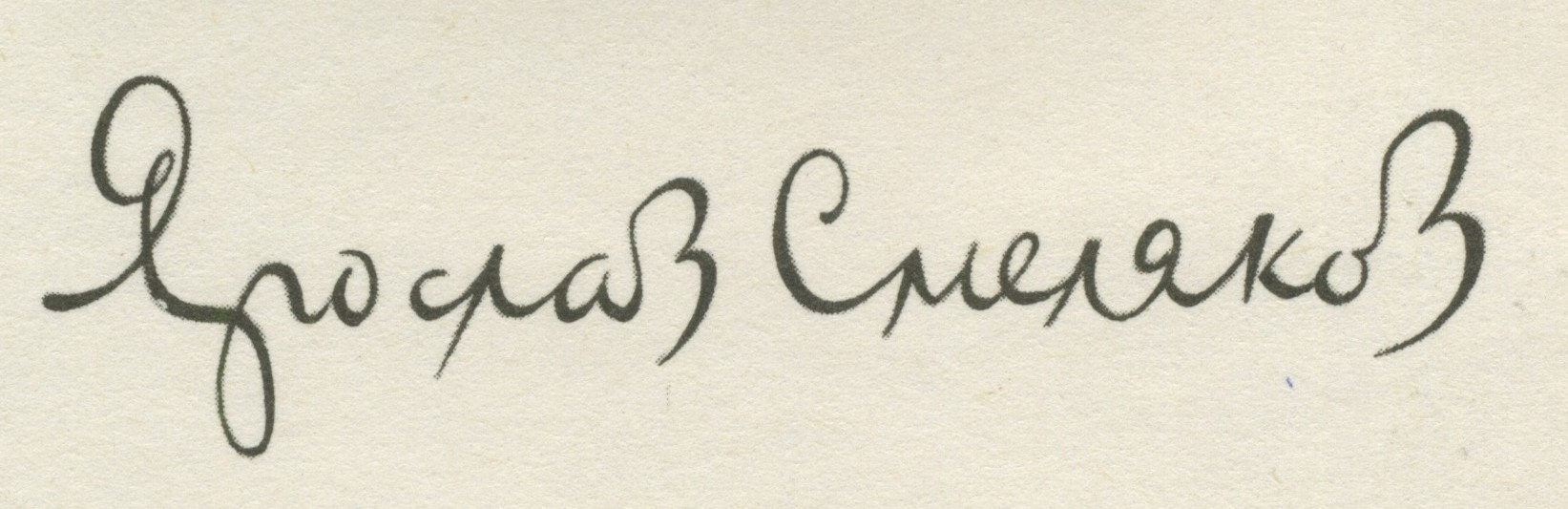

Yaroslav Vasilyevich Smelyakov (Russian: Яросла́в Васи́льевич Смеляко́в; 8 January 1913 – 27 November 1972) was a Russian Soviet poet, critic and translator.

== Early life ==
Smelyakov was born in Lutsk (now Ukraine). He was the son of a railroad worker. He spent his childhood in the village, where he graduated from elementary school. He then studied at the Moscow seven year school.

Smelyakov began to write poetry early in his life. He wrote propaganda for review. He made his debut in print in 1931.

He graduated from the printing factory school in 1931 and then went to work in a print shop.

== Career ==
At the urging of a friend, journalist Vsevolod Iordansky, Smelyakov brought his poems to the editor of a youth magazine; however, by mistake, he entered the building of the Oktyabr, where he was received by the poet Mikhail Svetlov, whom he adored. Svetlov allowed Smelyakov's poems to be published.

In 1934-1937, he was the victim of the purges conducted by the NKVD.

Smelyakov took part in the Great Patriotic War. From June to November 1941, he served on the North and Karelian Fronts. Once in the environment, he was in Finnish captivity until 1944. Returning from captivity, Smelyakov again came to the Gulag.

Thanks to Konstantin Simonov, who put in a good word, he was able to return to writing his book "Kremlin spruces" in 1948.

In 1951, after double denunciation by two poets, was arrested again and sent to the Polar Inta. Smelyakov lived there until 1955 when he was allowed to return home under an amnesty but not yet rehabilitated. He was rehabilitated later in 1956.

Since 1967, Smelyakov was a member of the Union of Soviet Writers where he presided over the Poetic division of the Union.

== Awards and honors ==
- Three Orders of the Red Banner of Labour (including 1963, 1967)
- USSR State Prize (1967)
- Lenin Komsomol Prize (1968)
- Medal "For Labour Valour"
