= Andrei Petrov =

Soviet and Russian composer (1930–2006)

- Андрей Петров
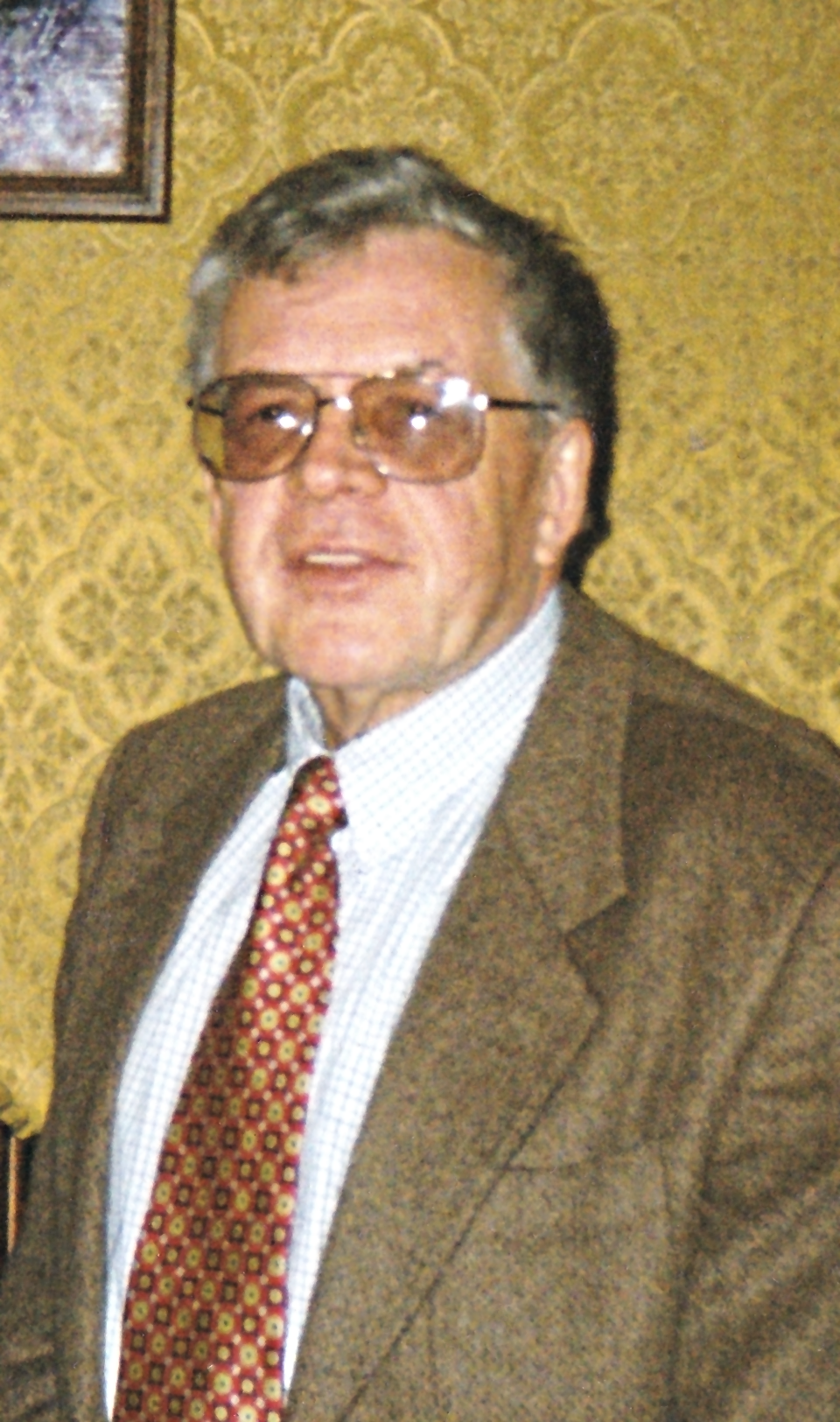
- Petrov in 1998
- Born: September 2, 1930; Leningrad
- Died: February 15, 2006 (aged 75); Saint Petersburg, Russia
- Resting place: Volkovo Cemetery
- Occupation: Composer
- Awards: People's Artist of the USSR (1980)

Andrei Pavlovich Petrov (Russian: Андре́й Па́влович Петро́в; 2 September 1930 – 15 February 2006) was a Soviet and Russian composer. He was named a People's Artist of the USSR in 1980. Andrey Petrov is known for his music for numerous classic Soviet films such as Walking the Streets of Moscow, Beware of the Car, and Office Romance.

== Life ==
A native of Leningrad, Petrov was the son of a military doctor; his mother was an artist. He had little interest in music until, at fourteen, he saw The Great Waltz; after this he decided to become a composer. He studied composition at the Leningrad Conservatory under Orest Yevlakhov.

Petrov is known for his work in various genres; he wrote a number of operas and ballets, as well as symphonic works, incidental and film music, and various songs. He is especially famous for his ballet Creation of the World (1968), based on drawings by Jean Effel. This was performed around the world, with Mikhail Baryshnikov among its first performers. Petrov also scored over eighty films, including the Soviet-American co-production The Blue Bird (1976).

From 1964 until his death Petrov was the head of the St. Petersburg Union of Composers, to which he was introduced by Dmitri Shostakovich. He also founded and served as the general director of a music festival in Saint Petersburg. He won numerous prizes and awards; on May 22, 1998, he was made an honorary citizen of Saint Petersburg. In 1993 a small planet, asteroid 4785 (Petrov) was named after him.

Petrov's wife, Natalya Yefimovna, was a well-known musicologist; his only daughter, Olga, co-wrote a number of his later works.

Andrey Petrov died in Saint Petersburg; he is buried at the Volkovo Cemetery.

== Selected works ==
=== Film music (selected) ===
- Amphibian Man (1961)
- Walking the Streets of Moscow (1964)
- Thirty Three (1965)
- Beware of the Car (1966)
- His Name Was Robert (1967)
- Fair Wind, "Blue Bird"! (1967)
- Zigzag of Success (1968)
- Vremya (1970; TV)
- Grandads-Robbers (1971)
- Taming of the Fire (1972)
- The Blue Bird (1976)
- White Bim Black Ear (1977)
- Office Romance (1977)
- Autumn Marathon (1979)
- Say a Word for the Poor Hussar (1981)
- Station for Two (1982)
- A Cruel Romance (1983)
- Forgotten Melody for a Flute (1987)

=== Other works ===
- "Poem" for 4 Trumpets, Organ, Strings, and Timpani
- Ballet "The Creation of the World" (1968)
- Concerto for Violin and Orchestra (1983)
- Symphony-Fantasy "The Master and Margarita" (1984)
- Concerto for Piano and Orchestra (1990)

== Honours and awards ==
- Order "For Merit to the Fatherland";
  - 3rd class (2 September 2005) – for outstanding contribution to the development of national musical culture, and many years of creative activity
  - 4th class (29 August 2000) – for his great personal contribution to the development of national musical art
- Order of Lenin (1985)
- State Prize of the Russian Federation (1995)
- Award of the President of the Russian Federation (1999)
- Order of the Red Banner of Labour (1967)
- USSR State Prize (1967 and 1976)
- People's Artist of the USSR (1980)
- People's Artist of the RSFSR (1976)
- Honored Art Worker of the RSFSR (1972)
- Honorary Citizen of St. Petersburg (Resolution of the Legislative Assembly of St. Petersburg № 104 of 22 May 1998)
