= Eldar Ryazanov =

Soviet and Russian filmmaker (1927–2015)

- Эльдар Рязанов
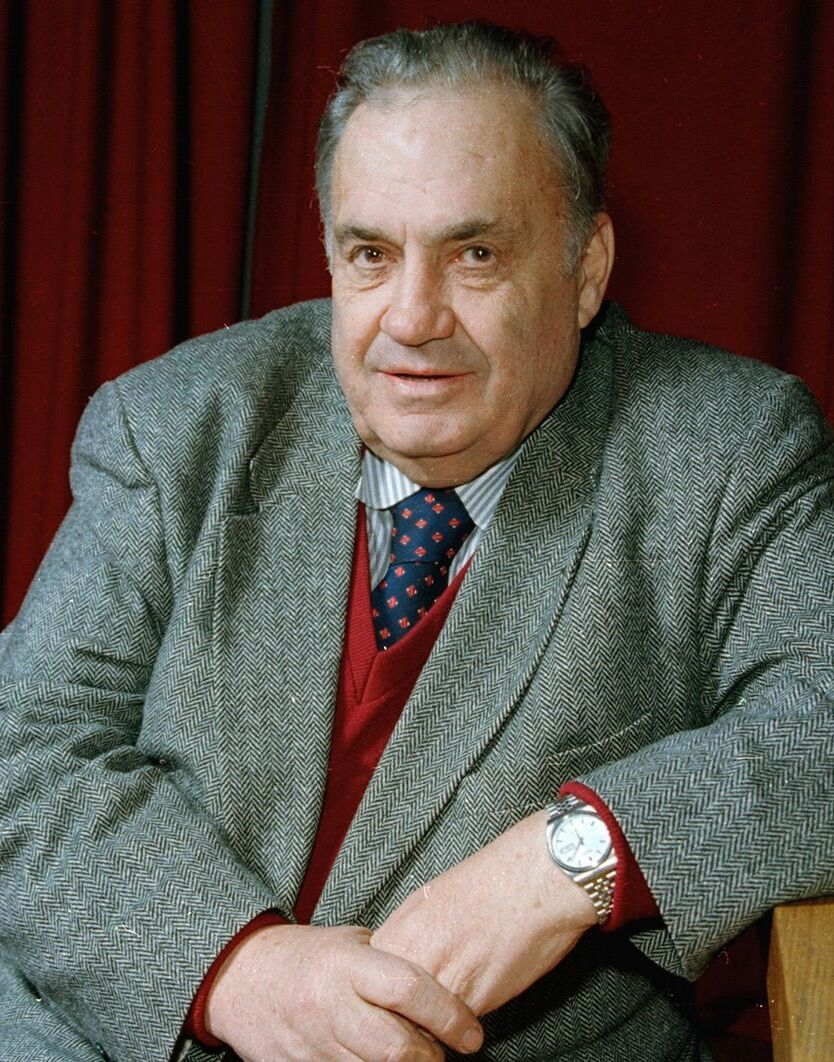
- Ryazanov in the 1990s
- Born: Eldar Aleksandrovich Ryazanov; 18 November 1927; Samara, Russian SFSR, USSR
- Died: 30 November 2015 (aged 88); Moscow, Russia
- Resting place: Novodevichy Cemetery, Moscow
- Occupations: Film director, screenwriter, actor, television presenter, poet, dramaturg, pedagogue
- Years active: 1950–2009
- Notable work: Carnival Night (1956); Beware of the Car (1966); Unbelievable Adventures of Italians in Russia (1973); The Irony of Fate (1975); Office Romance (1977); Station for Two (1982); A Cruel Romance (1984)
- Title: People's Artist of the USSR (1984)
- Spouse: Emma Abaydullina (1941—2024)
- Awards: USSR State Prize (1977)

Signature
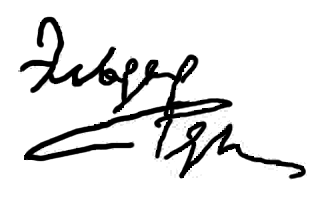

Eldar Aleksandrovich Ryazanov (Russian: Эльдар Александрович Рязанов; 18 November 1927 – 30 November 2015) was a Soviet and Russian film director, screenwriter, poet, actor and pedagogue whose popular comedies, satirizing the daily life of the Soviet Union and Russia, are celebrated throughout the former Soviet Union and former Warsaw Pact countries.

== Biography ==
Eldar Aleksandrovich Ryazanov was born in Samara. His father, Aleksandr Semyonovich Ryazanov, was a diplomat who worked in Tehran. His mother, Sofya Mikhailovna (née Shusterman), was of Jewish descent.

In 1930, the family moved to Moscow, and soon his parents divorced. He was then raised by his mother and her new husband, Lev Mikhailovich Kopp. In 1937 his father was arrested by the Stalinist government and subsequently served 18 years in the correctional labour camps.

Ryazanov began to create films in the early 1950s. In 1955, Ivan Pyryev, then a major force in the Soviet film industry, suggested to him to begin work on his film Carnival Night. At first, Ryazanov refused, as he wanted to make "serious films", but then was convinced to begin, as Pyryev believed that "anybody could shoot a melodrama, but only a few can create good comedy." He won instant success, and began to release more films.

He was named a People's Artist of the USSR in 1984, and received the USSR State Prize in 1977. He won the Nika Award for Best Director in 1991 for the film Promised Heaven.

Among his most famous films are Carnival Night (1955), Hussar Ballad (1962), Beware of the Car (1966), The Irony of Fate (1975), Office Romance (1977), The Garage (1980), Station for Two (1982) and A Cruel Romance (1984). Ryazanov's main genre was tragicomedy.

== Illness and death ==
Ryazanov had an acute ischemic stroke in November 2014. He was admitted to a Moscow hospital on 21 November 2015 due to shortness of breath. He died around midnight on 30 November 2015, of heart and lung failure, at the age of 88.

== Legacy ==
Ryazanov was one of the most successful film directors of the Soviet Union, and his films are still well-known in the post-USSR landscape. The Irony of Fate is still aired every December 31 in most post-USSR countries, except for Ukraine since the 2014 Revolution of Dignity. A street in Moscow was named after him in 2017, and a museum and memorial dedicated to his memory was opened on the site of his childhood home in Samara.

=== Criticism ===
In his book "Nepoladki v russkom dome" Sergey Kara-Murza wrote that "Ryazanov and the artists close to him, consumed by anti-Soviet feeling, lovingly reflected and thereby in many ways created a certain social and spiritual world - and this world turned out to be possible only when it was surrounded and protected by the crude structures of the Soviet way of life."

== Honours and awards ==
- Order "For Merit to the Fatherland";
  - 2nd class (3 July 2008) – for outstanding contribution to the development of national cinema and many years of creative activity
  - 3rd class (20 June 1996) – for services to the state, an outstanding contribution to the development of national cinema and culture
- Order of the Red Banner of Labour, twice (1969, 1977)
- Order of Friendship of Peoples (1987)
- Order of the "Key of Friendship" (Kemerovo Region, 2007)
- Commander of the Order of Arts and Letters (France)
- Commander of the Order of Honour (Georgia) (2008)
- People's Artist of the RSFSR (1974)
- People's Artist of the USSR (1984)
- USSR State Prize (1977) (for the film "Irony of Fate, or Enjoy Your Bath!")
- Vasilyev Brothers State Prize of the RSFSR (1979) (for the film "Office Romance")
- Winner of the All-Union Film Festival in the "First Prize among the comedies" for 1958
- Winner of the All-Union Film Festival in the "Special Award" for 1983
- Nika Awards;
  - Best Director (1991)
  - Best Fiction Film (1991)
  - Honour and dignity (2006)
- Winner of Tsarskoye Selo Art Prize (2005)
- The asteroid 4258 Ryazanov is named after him.

== Filmography ==
- 1950 They are Studying in Moscow (Russian: Они учатся в Москве), documentary – author (in co-operation with Zoya Fomina)
- 1951 The Way Named October (Дорога имени Октября), documentary – director (in co-operation with Liya Derbysheva)
- 1952 On the World Chess Championship (На первенство мира по шахматам), documentary – director
- 1953 Your Books (Твои книжки), documentary – director (in co-operation with Zoya Fomina)
- 1953 Near Krasnodar (Недалеко от Краснодара), documentary – director
- 1954 Island of Sakhalin (Остров Сахалин), documentary – director (in co-operation with Vasily Katanyan)
- 1955 Spring Voices (Весенние голоса), documentary – second director
- 1956 Carnival Night (Карнавальная ночь) – director
- 1957 The Girl Without Address (Девушка без адреса) – director
- 1961 How Robinson Was Created (Как создавался Робинзон) – director
- 1961 The Man from Nowhere (Человек ниоткуда) – director
- 1962 Hussar Ballad (Гусарская баллада) – director / screenwriter
- 1965 Give me a complaints book (Дайте жалобную книгу) – director / actor: chief editor
- 1966 Beware of the Car (Берегись автомобиля) – director / screenwriter
- 1968 Zigzag of Success (Зигзаг удачи) – director / screenwriter
- 1971 Grandads-Robbers (Старики-разбойники) – director / screenwriter / actor: the passer-by
- 1974 Unbelievable Adventures of Italians in Russia (Невероятные приключения итальянцев в России) – director / screenwriter / actor: doctor
- 1975 The Irony of Fate (Ирония судьбы или с легким паром!) – director / screenwriter / actor: airplane passenger
- 1977 Office Romance (Служебный роман) – director / screenwriter / actor: bus passenger
- 1979 The Garage (Гараж) – director / screenwriter / actor: sleeping Man
- 1981 Say a Word for the Poor Hussar (О бедном гусаре замолвите слово) – director / screenwriter / actor: confectioner
- 1982 Station for Two (Вокзал для двоих) – director / screenwriter / actor: railroad supervisor
- 1984 A Cruel Romance (Жестокий романс) – director / screenwriter
- 1987 Forgotten Melody for a Flute (Забытая мелодия для флейты) – director / screenwriter / actor: astronomer
- 1988 Dear Yelena Sergeyevna (Дорогая Елена Сергеевна) – director / screenwriter / actor: neighbour
- 1991 Promised Heaven (Небеса обетованные) – director / screenwriter / actor: man in diner
- 1993 Prediction (Предсказание) – director / screenwriter
- 1996 Hello, Fools! (Привет, дуралеи!) – director / screenwriter / actor: manager of the bookshop
- 2000 Old Hags (Старые клячи) – director / screenwriter / actor: judge
- 2000 Still Waters (Тихие омуты) – Director / Screenwriter / Actor: Radiologist / Producer
- 2003 The Key of Bedroom (Ключи от спальни) – director / screenwriter / actor: police constable / producer
- 2006 Carnival Night 2 (TV) – director / actor (cameo appearance)
- 2006 Andersen. Life Without Love – director / screenwriter (with Irakly Kvirikadze) / actor: mortician / producer
- 2007 The Irony of Fate 2 – actor (cameo appearance)
