= List of Soviet films of 1982 =

Title	Russian title	Director	Cast	Genre	Notes
1982
Along Unknown Paths	Там, на неведомых дорожках...	Mikhail Yuzovsky	Roman Monastyrsky	Fantasy	
Be my husband	Будьте моим мужем	Alla Surikova	Andrei Mironov, Elena Proklova	Romantic comedy	
Charodei	Чародеи	Konstantin Bromberg	Aleksandra Yakovleva, Aleksandr Abdulov, Yekaterina Vasilyeva, Valentin Gaft	Romance, fantasy	
Direct Heiress	Наследница по прямой	Sergey Solovyev	Tatyana Kovshova, Tatyana Drubich, Aleksandr Zbruyev	Drama	
Fathers and Grandfathers	Отцы и деды	Yuri Yegorov	Anatoliy Papanov, Valentin Smirnitskiy, Aleksey Yasulovich	Comedy	
Find and neutralize	Найти и обезвредить	Georgy Kuznetsov	Boris Nevzorov, Andrey Gradov, Aleksandr Voevodin	Action	
I Don't Want to Be an Adult	Не хочу быть взрослым	Yuri Chulyukin	Kirill Golovko-Sersky, Natalya Varley, Evgeniy Steblov	Comedy	
In the Old Rhythms	В старых ритмах	Mikhail Yershov	Semyon Morozov, Anastasiya Glez, Nikolay Trofimov	Comedy	
Incident at Map Grid 36-80	Случай в квадрате 36-80	Mikhail Tumanishvili	Boris Shcherbakov	Action	
Married Bachelor	Женатый холостяк	Vladimir Rogovoy	Larisa Udovichenko, Yuriy Grigorev, Aleksandr Pshenichnov	Comedy	
The Circus Princess	Принцесса цирка	Svetlana Druzhinina	Igor Keblusek, Natalya Belokhvostikova, Nikolay Trofimov	Musical comedy	
The Chosen One	Избранные	Sergey Solovyev	Leonid Filatov, Tatyana Drubich, Amparo Grisales	Drama	
The Donkey's Hide	Ослиная шкура	Nadezhda Kosheverova	Vladimir Etush, Svetlana Nemolyaeva, Vera Novikova, Aleksandr Galibin	Fantasy	
Gikor	Гикор	Sergey Israelyan	Albert Gulinyan, Galya Novents, Armen Dzhigarkhanyan, Zhenya Avetisyan, Emma Stepanyan	Drama	
The House That Swift Built	Дом, который построил Свифт	Mark Zakharov	Oleg Yankovsky, Aleksandr Abdulov, Vladimir Belousov, Yevgeny Leonov	Comedy	
I Cannot Say "Farewell"	Не могу сказать «прощай»	Boris Durov	Sergei Varchuk, Anastasia Ivanova, Tatiana Parkina	Romantic drama	
The Pokrovsky Gate	Покровские ворота	Mikhail Kozakov	Oleg Menshikov, Inna Ulyanova, Anatoly Ravikovich, Leonid Bronevoy	Comedy	
The Star and Death of Joaquin Murieta	Звезда и смерть Хоакина Мурьеты	Vladimir Grammatikov	Andrey Kharitonov, lyona Belyak, Aleksandr Filippenko	Drama	
Premonition of Love	Предчувствие любви	Tofik Shakhverdiev	Aleksandr Abdulov, Irina Alfyorova, Mikhail Gluzskiy	Comedy	
Private Life	Частная жизнь	Yuli Raizman	Mikhail Ulyanov, Iya Savvina, Irina Gubanova, Tatyana Dogileva	Drama	
Resident Return	Возвращение резидента	Venyamin Dorman	Georgiy Zhzhonov, Pyotr Velyaminov, Leonid Bronevoy	Thriller	
The Queen of Spades	Пиковая дама	Igor Maslennikov	Viktor Proskurin, Alla Demidova, Innokenty Smoktunovsky	Drama	
Sportloto-82	Спортлото-82	Leonid Gaidai	Algis Arlauskas	Comedy	
Station for Two	Вокзал для двоих	Eldar Ryazanov	Lyudmila Gurchenko, Oleg Basilashvili, Nikita Mikhalkov, Nonna Mordyukova	Romantic comedy	Entered into the 1983 Cannes Film Festival
Tears Were Falling	Слёзы капали	Georgiy Daneliya	Yevgeny Leonov, Iya Savvina, Nina Grebeshkova, Aleksandra Yakovleva	Fantasy	
The Train Has Stopped	Oстановился пoeзд	Vadim Abdrashitov	Oleg Borisov, Anatoly Solonitsyn, Mikhail Gluzsky, Nina Ruslanova	Drama	
Through the Fire	Сквозь огонь	Leonid Makarychev	Boris Krichevsky, Aleksey Buldakov, Tatyana Bedova	Drama	
Treasure Island	Остров сокровищ	Vladimir Vorobyov	Oleg Borisov	Adventure	
The Voice	Голос	Ilya Averbakh	Natalya Sayko, Leonid Filatov, Grigori Kalatosishvili, Vsevolod Shilovsky, Petr Shelokhonov	Drama	
We Weren't Married in Church	Нас венчали не в церкви	Boris Tokarev	Aleksandr Galibin, Natalya Vavilova, Pyotr Velyaminov	Drama	
