= Success (1984 film) =

- Russian: Успех
- Directed by: Konstantin Khudyakov
- Written by: Anatoli Grebnev
- Starring: Leonid Filatov; Alisa Freindlich; Aleksandr Zbruyev; Lev Durov; Larisa Udovichenko
- Cinematography: Valentin Piganov
- Edited by: Galina Patrikeyeva
- Music by: Vyacheslav Ganelin
- Release date: 1984
- Running time: 93 minute
- Country: Soviet Union
- Language: Russian

Success (Russian: Успех) is a 1984 Soviet drama film directed by Konstantin Khudyakov.

== Plot ==
The film tells about a cruel director who goes to a peripheral theater to stage The Seagull. He is obsessed and very passionate and gains success. But the price of this success is too expensive.

== Cast ==
- Leonid Filatov as Gennadi Fetisov
- Alisa Freindlich as Zinaida Nikolayevna Arsenyeva
- Aleksandr Zbruyev as Oleg Zuyev
- Lev Durov as Pavlik Platonov
- Larisa Udovichenko as Alla Saburova
- Anatoliy Romashin as Nikolai Knyazev
- Lyudmila Saveleva as Inna (as L. Saveleva)
- Alla Meshcheryakova as Nyusya (as A. Meshcheryakova)
- Marina Politseymako as Galya (as M. Politseymako)
- Vatslav Dvorzhetsky as Vinokurov (as V. Dvorzhetsky)
