= Vertical Race (film) =

1982 TV miniseries

- Written by: Vayner Brothers
- Directed by: Aleksander Muratov
- Starring: Andrey Myagkov; Valentin Gaft
- Music by: Eugen Doga
- Country of origin: Soviet Union
- Original language: Russian

Production
- Cinematography: Aleksandr Yanovsky
- Editor: Elizaveta Rybak
- Running time: 199 minutes
- Production company: Dovzhenko Film Studios

Original release
- Release: 1982

Vertical Race (Russian: «Гонки по вертикали», romanized: Gonki po vertikali) is a 1982 Soviet three-part crime miniseries directed by Aleksander Muratov based on the story of the same name by the Vayner Brothers.

== Plot ==
The action takes place in the USSR in the 1980s. The plot is based on the confrontation between Moscow Criminal Investigations Department inspector Stanislav Tikhonov (Andrey Myagkov) and the thief-recidivist Alexei Dedushkin, nicknamed "Baton" (Valentin Gaft).

Officers of the investigations department detain a criminal with an imported suitcase packed with foreign things among which they find the Order of St. Andrew, but due to insufficient evidence (no report of theft), they have to let "Baton" go. He is at large and continues to pursue criminal activities. He begins to feel threatened, starts to steal fur hats and coats from a store, commits a theft in the apartment of a retired general, where, in addition to the savings book, "Baton" also takes the revolver and cartridges. Taking the thief into custody becomes a matter of principle to Tikhonov, he carefully collects the evidence, and Dedushkin has nowhere to go. The cornered criminal is ready to use weapons against a police officer.

== Cast ==
- Andrey Myagkov - Stanislav Tikhonov, investigator
- Valentin Gaft - Lyokha Dedushkin, thief-recidivist named "Baton"
- Vladimir Salnikov - Alexander Saveliev, Tikhonov's assistant (voiced by Aleksandr Ryzhkov)
- Nikolai Zasukhin - Vladimir Ivanovich Sharapov, the head of Tikhonov
- Galina Polskikh - Zosia, a friend of the "Baton"
- Irina Brazgovka - Lyudmila Mihailovna Roznina, an employee of the archive
- Elena Kapitsa - Lena, Tikhonov's former beloved
- Stanislav Chekan - captain of militsiya, the duty officer of the bullpen
- Vyacheslav Zholobov - Igor Ivanov, administrator of "Racing in the vertical"
- Valery Durov - phalerist
- Iraida Stroumova - director of the archive (voiced by Yevgeniya Khanayeva)
- Alexander Valkovich - Alexander Mikhailovich, archivist
- Zinaida Dekhtyaryova - Tikhonov's mother (voiced by Yevgeniya Uralova)
- Kapitolina Ilenko - Elizaveta Henrichovna von Dietz (Boyko)
- Vasily Korzun - Oleg Nikolayevich Lebedev, chief of the Ministry of Internal Affairs (voiced by Nikolai Grabbe)
- Boris Bityukov - "The Shaman"
- Vladimir Druzhnikov - Alexey Y. Uvnarskiy, Surgeon
- Ninel Myshkova - Valentina, wife of Obnorsky
- Vladimir Koval - Signor Costelli
- Valery Nosik - airport employee, former accomplice of "Baton"
- Viktor Miroshnichenko - Bakum, taxi driver
