= Sons of Bitches =

1990 film

- Directed by: Leonid Filatov
- Written by: Leonid Filatov
- Produced by: Yuri Kushnerev; Andrey Razumovsky; Yuri Romanenko
- Starring: Vladimir Ilyin; Larisa Udovichenko; Aleksandr Abdulov; Yevgeny Yevstigneyev; Liya Akhedzhakova; Vladimir Samoilov
- Cinematography: Pavel Lebeshev
- Edited by: Olga Grinshpun; Tatiana Egorycheva
- Music by: Vladimir Komarov
- Production companies: Mosfilm; Ritm; Fora Film
- Release date: 1990
- Running time: 98 minutes
- Country: Soviet Union
- Language: Russian

Sons of Bitches (Russian: Сукины дети, translit. Sukiny deti) is a 1990 Soviet comedy-drama film directed by Leonid Filatov. It was entered into the 17th Moscow International Film Festival.

== Plot ==
The plot of the film is based on real historical events in the Taganka Theater, when its leader Yuri Lyubimov left the USSR (1984), and made a number of anti-Party statements, after which he was removed from the management of the theater and deprived of citizenship. Sons of bitches tells how the troupe has apprehended these events and the pressure the state put on them, and also shows events that have not happened – the actors' strike, the hunger strike, the threat of self-immolation. A functionary is sent to the theater from the Ministry – Yuri Mikhailovich, who is to restore order in the rebellious cultural institution. The story ends in tragedy – with the death of one of the protesters.

== Cast ==
- Vladimir Ilyin as Leva Busygin
- Larisa Udovichenko as Tatyana, Busygin's wife
- Aleksandr Abdulov as Igor Gordynsky
- Yevgeny Yevstigneyev as Andrey Ivanovich Nanaytsev
- Liya Akhedzhakova as Ella Ernestovna, Nanaytsev's wife
- Vladimir Samoilov as Pyotr Yegorovich, Theater's Director
- Yelena Tsyplakova as Lidiya Nikolaevna Fedyaeva
- Tatyana Kravchenko as Serafima Mikhailovna Korzukhina
- Nina Shatskaya as Elena Konstantinovna Gvozdilova
- Sergey Makovetskiy as Borya Sinyukhaev
- Mariya Zubareva as Ninochka
- Galina Petrova as Tyunina
- Stanislav Govorukhin as Sergey Sergeevich Popov, writer
- Lyudmila Zaytseva as Anna Kuzminichna
- Leonid Filatov as Yuri Mikhailovich

== Production ==
At first, Larisa Udovichenko refused to play the scene where she undresses totally nude in front of the official, played by director Leonid Filatov himself, and in the episode of seduction she starred partially dressed (photos were left from the filming). But then, as Larisa Udovichenko recalled, "Leonid came to me with his wife Nina Shatskaya and on his knees begged me to be naked. Otherwise, the shock that his hero should experience does not work". Filatov promised that everything will be filmed delicately. "Leonid did not deceive me: there was no vulgarity. But all the same, I felt bad after that, I was ashamed in front of my parents, daughter, close friends", Udovichenko said.
