= Yevgeny Leonov-Gladyshev =

Soviet and Russian actor and film director

Yevgeny Leonov-Gladyshev PAR
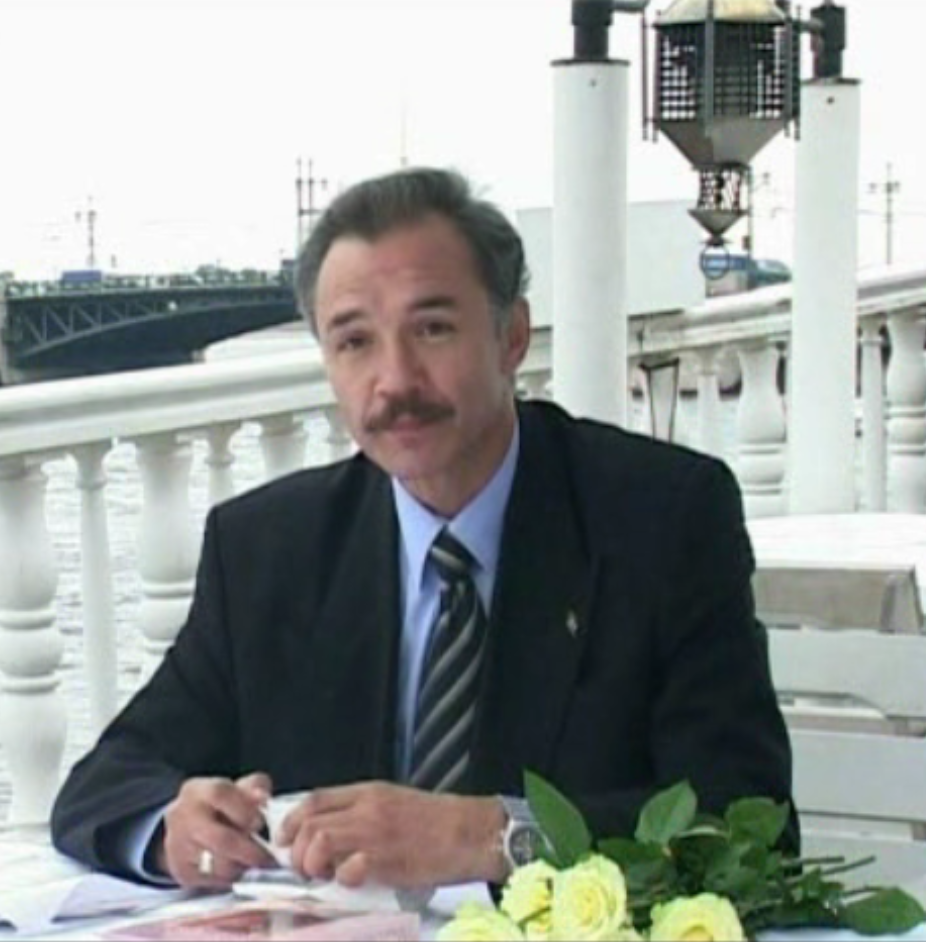
- Born: Yevgeny Borisovich Leonov; 24 January 1952 (age 74); Vilnius
- Occupations: actor film director
- Years active: 1972–present

Yevgeny Borisovich Leonov-Gladyshev (Russian: Евге́ний Бори́сович Лео́нов-Гла́дышев; born 24 Jan 1952, Vilnius, Lithuanian SSR, USSR) is a Soviet and Russian theater and film actor, and film director. He was awarded Honored Artist of the Russian Federation (1993) and People's Artist of the Russian Federation (2007).

== Background ==
He graduated from the Russian State Institute of Performing Arts (workshop of Vasili Merkuryev and Irina Meyerhold). His debut came in a teenage film Turn the Northern Lights (1972).

In the film The Meeting Place Cannot Be Changed (1979) Leonov-Gladyshev was offered a trial for one of the main roles, Sharapov. But the artistic council did not approve his candidacy, and the role went to Vladimir Konkin. Instead, director Stanislav Govorukhin offered Yevgeny a small role as an operative Vasya Vekshin.

Since the early 1980s, the actor has worked in remaking foreign films. In 1992 he tried directing. In 1999 he became president of the Guild of film actors of St. Petersburg.

A new round of popularity of the actor came in the police procedural Deadly Force.
