= Visit to Minotaur =

- Written by: Arkady Vainer; Georgy Vainer
- Directed by: Eldor Urazbayev
- Starring: Sergey Shakurov; Anna Kamenkova; Aleksandr Filippenko
- Music by: Eduard Artemyev
- Country of origin: Soviet Union
- Original language: Russian

Production
- Cinematography: Aleksandr Rybin
- Running time: 350 minutes
- Production company: Gorky Film Studio

Original release
- Release: 9 November – 14 November 1987

Visit to Minotaur (Russian: Визит к Минотавру, romanized: Vizit k Minotavru) is a Soviet TV serial detective film based on the eponymous novel by the Vayner Brothers, shot by the director Eldor Urazbayev in 1987.

== Plot ==
USSR, Moscow in the 1980s. A unique violin made by Antonio Stradivari is stolen from the apartment of the famous violinist Lev Osipovich Polyakov. Attorney Stanislav Tikhonov and police lieutenant Elena Nechayeva proceed to investigate the case.

First, suspicions fall on Obolnikov, neighbor of the Polyakov family. But it turns out that although Obolnikov did secretly enter the apartment of the violinist he was not involved in the theft. Then Pavel Ikonnikov becomes the suspect – a former violinist who was once well acquainted with Polyakov. A motive is evident: envy of the more fortunate and successful colleague could push Ikonnikov toward crime. Some information which includes an anonymous letter indicates that Ikonnikov could be involved in the theft. But also in this case Tikhonov and Nechayeva are wrong. Moreover, Ikonnikov, deeply offended over the unfounded suspicions commits suicide. As farewell, Ikonnikov wrote a letter to Tikhonov, in which he states that the person who slandered him is apparently a person who is very close to Ikonnikov.

An unexpected breakthrough in this complicated case is the appearance of the stolen cassette player belonging to Polyakov. Clinging to this evidence, the investigation manages to come upon the "master thief" Melnik, who helped criminals open the door to the violinists apartment. There were two criminals - "Cross" and "Boss" but they can not be found.

A random occurrence helps Tikhonov. During confrontation with arrested Melnik, piano tuner Gregory Belash suddenly gives false testimony that Melnik and Ikonnikov met with each other after the violin was stolen. Tikhonov for the first time begins to suspect Belash whom he previously liked. The attorney Tikhonov examines in detail Belash's alibi on the day of the theft and discovers that Belash is one of the criminals, the very same "Boss". Belash is arrested, but the most dangerous criminal "Cross" is still at large. He is armed and dangerous and most importantly - the Stradivarius violin is in his hands. It would seem that to catch this cunning and cautious offender is impossible, but unexpected "help" to the investigation is offered by an empty jar of pickled mushrooms. Tikhonov and Nechayeva apprehend "Cross" and Elena is seriously injured. And in the very last moment customs delay departure of a plane from the USSR on which a foreigner is boarded who has bought the Stradivarius from "Cross", trying to take the priceless musical instrument abroad.

At the same time a second story-line unfolds in the film about the great violin maker Antonio Stradivari.

Italy, Cremona, end of the - 17th - start of the 18th century. The famous violin maker Nicola Amati takes a simple street boy Antonio Stradivari as a student. Stradivarius is a diligent student and some time later Antonio becomes superior to his old teacher when he creates an incomparable varnish which allows to make unique-sounding musical instruments. Stradivarius leaves Amati, marries, one after the other four sons are born, but nobody buys Stradivarius' instruments, Amati is for the most famous violin maker in Europe, and simply no one knows of Stradivarius.

But soon Fortuna finally smiles upon the despairing Stradivarius; his instruments are finally becoming more popular. Antonio becomes rich, he and his family begin to live in luxury, but this does not stop Stradivarius for even a moment. Antonio continues to search for more and more sophisticated ways of processing wood, varnish manufacture, so that his violins sound better and better. But Stradivarius is unhappy because circumstances concerning his family unfold in a woeful way. His beloved wife dies, eldest son becomes a merchant-slaver, middle son - a Jesuit monk, and two younger sons do not have either the talent nor the desire to learn the violin business.

Soon Stradivarius is offered with a unique chance to pass on his knowledge and skill onto worthy hands as to him comes a young man named Giuseppe Guarneri and asks the great master to take him as a disciple. Alas, Stradivarius refuses future genius, and Guarneri is forced to literally sell himself into slavery to the Jesuits. For food and accommodation Giuseppe is obliged for 15 years to give all the musical instruments he made. As the years go by, one day on the street Stradivarius hears the sound of Guarneri's violin. Tears appear in the old master's eyes as he realizes that someone has created a violin that sounds better than his musical instruments...

== Cast ==
Moscow, USSR, 20th century

- Sergey Shakurov – Stanislav Tikhonov, investigator of public prosecutor's office
- Anna Kamenkova – Elena Nechaeva, police lieutenant
- Aleksandr Filippenko – Gregory Belash, tuner of musical instruments
- Vladimir Samoilov – Vladimir Uvarov, senior attorney
- Valentin Gaft – Pavel Ikonnikov, former violinist
- Mikhail Pugovkin – Stepan Melnik, the manufacturer of thieves' tools
- Laimonas Noreika – Lev Polyakov, famous violinist
- Lev Borisov – Sergei Obolnikov, alcoholic, Polyakov's neighbor
- Svetlana Kharitonova – Evdokiya Obolnikova, Sergei Obolnikov's wife
- Grigoriy Lyampe – Noah Khaletskiy, expert criminalist
- Nina Menshikova – Anna Yablonskaya, Ikonnikov's former wife
- Aleksandr Yakovlev – Jacob Cross, a criminal
- Natalya Arinbasarova – Marina Kolesnikova, violinist
- Boris Smorchkov – Silkin, plumber
- Nina Shatskaya – Alla Georgievna, narcologist
- Manefa Sobolevskaya – Melnik's wife
- Valentin Smirnitsky – Aleksandr Sadomsky, theater tickets distributor
- Oleg Khabalov – Nikolay Dzasokhov (Kislyaev), printing worker (voice by Vladimir Ferapontov
- Boris Levinson – Semyon Katz, hairdresser
- Yuriy Katin-Yartsev – Nikolay Trubitcin, Belash's former teacher
- Vadim Zakharchenko – store manager
- Aleksandr Rakhlenko – Sergei Leonidov, the police inspector of the Leningrad (voice by Sergei Bystritskiy)
- Ervin Knausmyuller – Franz Kolvud, Swiss businessman

Cremona, Italy, 17-18th century

- Sergey Shakurov – Antonio Stradivari
- Rostislav Plyatt – Nicola Amati
- Marina Levtova – Francesca, Antonio Stradivari's the first wife
- Yury Moroz – Paolo, Antonio Stradivari's the first son
- Andrey Dubovskiy – Giuseppe, Antonio Stradivari's the second son (voice by Sergei Maliszewski)
- Valentin Nikulin – Andrea Guarneri
- Nikolai Denisov – Giuseppe Guarneri
- Audris Chadaravicius – Lord Cunningham, a messenger of English King (voice by Sergei Maliszewski)
- Leonardas Zelcius – Signor Pichenardi

== Filming ==
- The foundation of the novel by the Vainer brothers written in 1972 was based on a real story. The prototype for the image Polyakov was the outstanding Soviet violinist David Oistrakh. In 1968, his apartment where he kept a unique collection of violins was broken into and a large number of valuables were stolen. The violins, which Oistrakh's collection yet did not include the works of Stradivarius were not touched.]
- Nicolo Amati - this is the last and according to many critics, the best film role of Rostislav Plyatt. In dramatic performance it resembles a kind of testament.
- The title of the film is based on the legend of the Minotaur as about a certain creature which lives inside every human being and is the concentration of all the vices of man. A strong and honest man is capable of defeating his own Minotaur while the weak one will be "eaten" by the monster within.
- The picture shows a real Stradivarius violin, made by the master during his years of apprenticeship under the supervision of Amati, and the real violin of the great master sounds in the movie. Ten years after the film's release in 1996 the violin was stolen from the State Central Museum of Musical Culture named after Glinka.
- The film premiered November 9, 1987, on the eve of the Police Day.
- During the filming of serpentarium it was discovered that Valentin Gaft was very afraid of snakes, and so with the consent of the director he had to drink alcohol "for courage".
- Shooting in the "Italian Cremona" actually took place in Vilnius.

== Errors and inaccuracies ==
- The error that appeared in the book and was passed in the movie: Belash comes to Leningrad in a nonexistent passing train "Yerevan-Murmansk", actually surpassing even the "Red Arrow". In 1986, when the film is set, there were no passenger trains passing through Moscow. All trains in the region were making the rounds on the big ring of the Moscow railway, 25km from Moscow itself. Therefore in reality Belash would have taken much longer to get to Leningrad.
- In the film the phrase is uttered, "Nicolo Amati was sure of his impending death, but the days passed, he lived for another seventeen years and created immortal Trianon ensemble - two cellos, six violas and violins eighteen for the orchestra of the Charles IX of France". However, the king Charles IX (1550-1574) died before the birth of Nicolo Amati (1596-1684), and therefore could not have purchased his instruments.

== The differences between the novel and the film ==
- In the novel the partner of Tikhonov bears the surname Lavrova, in the film - Nechayeva.
- In the book, there is no romantic subplot about a relationship between Tikhonov and Nechaeva (Lavrova in the novel).
- The novel is set in 1970, the film - in 1986. As a result, there are some obvious anachronisms; Ikonnikov as played by Valentin Gaft looks too young to be able to perform live concerts in the besieged Leningrad, and Belash as portrayed by Alexander Filippenko to be involved in the development of virgin lands as mentioned in the film.
- In the novel, Yuri Lopakov (Hryunya, a childhood friend of the offender) and Danila Nikodimov nicknamed "Cross", are different people. In the film these characters are combined into one.
- In the novel, there is no final chase scene: Elena and Tikhonov detain "Cross" at a product base and find the violin among his belongings. In the film, the customs officers seize the violin from the Swiss businessman right on the plane.
- In the novel Tikhonov's boss is Sharapov, chief of MUR – the aged hero of The Meeting Place Cannot Be Changed. In the film instead of the police general Sharapov the senior prosecutor Uvarov is depicted.
- In the film, the role of the Belash's mother is completely left out, and as a consequence her significant role in the development of her son on to the path of hatred and envy of others is also missing. In the novel, she is shown as a rigid, poorly educated person who raises her son alone with the attitude of hostility to the more prosperous.
