= Vladimir Zharikov =

Russian actor and stuntman (1938–2024)

Vladimir Yurievich Zharikov (Russian: Владимир Юрьевич Жариков; 6 November 1938 – 10 May 2024) was a Soviet and Russian actor, stuntman, stunt coordinator and cinematographer.

A Soviet Spetsnaz serviceman during the Vietnam War, Zharikov subsequently attended the University of Odessa in 1968. After graduation, he worked as a scientist and stuntman for a time before focusing more fully on his chosen career. In addition to his stunt work, featured in 80 movies, he was also an actor, with 17 roles, including 1978's d'Artagnan and Three Musketeers, 1979's The Meeting Place Cannot Be Changed and Pirates of the 20th Century, and 1987's Desyat Negrityat.

Born in Smolensk on 6 November 1938, he died on 10 May 2024, at the age of 85.
