= From the Life of a Chief of the Criminal Police =

1983 Soviet film

- Russian: Из жизни начальника уголовного розыска
- Directed by: Stepan Puchinyan
- Written by: Aleksandr Lavrov; Olga Lavrova
- Starring: Kirill Lavrov; Leonid Filatov; Elena Proklova; Natalia Gontuar; Aleksandr Prodan
- Cinematography: Aleksandr Kovalchuk; Gasan Tutunov
- Edited by: Rimma Tsegelnitskaya
- Music by: Andrei Gevorgyan
- Release date: 1983
- Running time: 93 minute
- Country: Soviet Union
- Language: Russian

From the Life of a Chief of the Criminal Police (Russian: Из жизни начальника уголовного розыска) is a 1983 Soviet detective film directed by Stepan Puchinyan.

The film tells about the difficult relationship between the head of the criminal investigation department and the thief, which change with the emergence of a critical situation.

== Plot ==
After being discharged from the hospital, police Colonel Malych attends a housewarming party for his new neighbors in a communal apartment, only to recognize his neighbor as Slepnyev, a former repeat offender he once imprisoned. Now seemingly reformed, Slepnyev has returned to the city of his youth with his wife and children, intent on leaving his criminal past behind.

The plot centers on a pair of hidden guns Slepnyev concealed before his arrest—prized by both the police and criminals—and his internal struggle with the values of his former underworld life. When Slepnyev attempts to dispose of the weapons in a river, he is intercepted by criminals who use the guns in a violent robbery at a savings bank. Coincidentally present at the scene to pay household bills, Slepnyev intervenes to save Malych from being killed by one of the desperate criminals, risking his life to protect the man who once put him behind bars.

== Cast ==
- Kirill Lavrov as Col. Malych Ivan Konstantinovich
- Leonid Filatov as Stepan Petrovich Slepnyov
- Elena Proklova as Natalia Petrovna Slepnyova
- Natalia Gontuar as Anechka Slepnyova (as Natasha Gontuar)
- Aleksandr Prodan as Kolya Slepnyov (as Sasha Prodan)
- Natalya Fateeva as Teacher
- Leonid Kharitonov as Grandfather
- Igor Livanov as Volodya Panteleev
- Yuriy Chernov as Gangster Koryto
- Aleksandr Pashutin as Driver Utkin
