= The Road to Berth =

1962 Soviet film

- Film poster
- Russian: Путь к причалу
- Directed by: Georgiy Daneliya
- Written by: Viktor Konetskiy
- Produced by: Dmitry Zalbstein
- Starring: Boris Andreyev; Oleg Zhakov; Lyubov Sokolova; Aleksandr Metyolkin; Valentin Nikulin
- Cinematography: Anatoli Nitochkin
- Edited by: Mariya Timofeeva
- Music by: Andrei Petrov
- Production company: Mosfilm
- Release date: 10 September 1962
- Running time: 84 min.
- Country: Soviet Union
- Language: Russian

The Road to Berth (Russian: Путь к причалу, romanized: Put k prichalu) is a 1962 Soviet drama film directed by Georgiy Daneliya.

The film is about Vasya, a man who decides to go to the Arctic. There he finds a job on the sea rescue tow. Together with the crew he will have to tow the ship Polotsk from Novaya Zemlya, which was defeated and damaged during World War II.

== Plot ==
Fifteen-year-old Vaska (Aleksandr Metelkin) boards the rescue tugboat Kola with the goal of reaching Murmansk. Onboard, he encounters the gruff but respected boatswain, Zosima Rosomakha (Boris Andreyev), whom Vaska quickly admires. A playful rivalry between Rosomakha and helmsman Marat Chepin (Valentin Nikulin) unfolds over a table football match, with Vaska siding with Rosomakha, ensuring his victory. However, Vaska's curiosity and enthusiasm for machinery lead to mishaps, including flooding the first officer’s cabin and accidentally falling overboard. Rosomakha saves him, and despite the captain's initial decision to remove him from the crew, Vaska is allowed to stay as an apprentice mechanic.

The Kola sets off on a mission to salvage the World War II-damaged ship Polotsk. Before departure, Rosomakha has a chance encounter with Maria (Lyubov Sokolova), a former colleague who reveals that she has a son, Andrey, who might be his. Rosomakha, haunted by his past, unsuccessfully seeks reconciliation with her. Upon reaching the Polotsk, the crew, including Vaska, Chepin, and Bruno (Bruno Oya), boards the damaged vessel to prepare it for towing. As a storm approaches, the team struggles to keep the Polotsk afloat, battling leaks and pump failures. During a quiet moment, Rosomakha bonds with Vaska and promises to introduce him to his son once they return to Murmansk.

A crisis arises when the Kola receives an emergency call from the freighter Odessa, which is adrift and heading toward dangerous reefs. The captain decides to abandon the Polotsk to save the Odessa, but Rosomakha hesitates, unwilling to sacrifice his current crew. A heated debate ensues among the team, culminating in Vaska's simple but piercing remark: "I wouldn’t want a father like that." Moved, Rosomakha heroically cuts the towline, allowing the Kola to rush to the Odessa’s aid. The Polotsk is ultimately destroyed in the storm, and while the surviving crew members cling to the wreck, Rosomakha succumbs to his injuries after ensuring their safety. His selflessness leaves a profound impact on those he saved, cementing his legacy as a true hero.

== Cast ==
- Boris Andreyev as Zosima Rosomakha
- Oleg Zhakov as Georgiy Gastev
- Lyubov Sokolova as Mariya
- Aleksandr Metyolkin as Vaska Metyolkin
- Valentin Nikulin as Marat Lepin
- Bruno O'Ya as Bruno
- Ada Sheremetyeva as Mayka
- Igor Bogolyubov as Gennadiy Borisovich
- Viktor Kolpakov as senior mechanic
- Georgiy Vitsin as Velikankin
- Sergei Nikonenko as detonator on duty
