= Vayner Brothers =

The Vayner Brothers (Russian: Братья Вайнеры), Arkady Vayner (1931-2005) and Georgy Vayner) (1938-2009), were popular Soviet mystery fiction writers of Russian Jewish descent. Together they authored some 150 books and 22 screenplays.

Both have been awarded with the Order of the Badge of Honour (March 1988) and they individually have other awards.

== Novels ==
- Clock For Mr. Kelly (Часы для мистера Келли, 1967)
- I, the Investigator... (Я, следователь…, 1968)
- Walking By Touch At Noon or The Right to Walk on the Earth (Ощупью в полдень or Право ходить по земле, 1969)
- Two Among the People (Двое среди людей, 1969)
- Vertical Race (Гонки по вертикали, 1971)
- Visit to Minotaur (Визит к Минотавру, 1972)
- Age of Mercy (Эра милосердия, 1976)
- Medicine Against Fear (Лекарство для Несмеяны or Лекарство против страха, 1978)
- I'm On Duty in the City (Город принял!, 1978)
- The Victims Have No Claims or Drive Around of Downed Cats And Dogs On the Road (Потерпевшие претензий не имеют or Объезжайте на дорогах сбитых кошек и собак, 1986)

== Filmography (screenplays) ==
- I, the Investigator... (1971)
- Night Visit (Ночной визит, 1974, first adaptation of Visit to Minotaur)
- Poverty Certificate (Свидетельство о бедности, 1977, adaptation of Clock For Mr. Kelly)
- Medicine Against Fear (1978)
- The Meeting Place Cannot Be Changed (Место встречи изменить нельзя, 1979, adaptation of Age of Mercy)
- I'm On Duty in the City (1979)
- Vertical Race (1983)
- The Victims Have No Claims (1986)
- Visit to Minotaur (1987)
- Entrance to the Labyrinth (Вход в лабиринт, 1989, second adaptation of Medicine Against Fear)

== See also ==
- Satan, a 1991 film based on the novel Nonhuman by Arkadi Vayner, but the director failed to reach an agreement with Vayners, and he wrote a new screenplay loosely based on the central idea of Vayners' novel
