= Zerograd =

Zerograd, Zero City
- Directed by: Karen Shakhnazarov
- Written by: Karen Shakhnazarov Aleksandr Borodyansky
- Starring: Leonid Filatov; Oleg Basilashvili; Vladimir Menshov; Armen Dzhigarkhanyan; Yevgeniy Yevstigneyev
- Cinematography: Nikolay Nemolyaev
- Music by: Eduard Artemyev
- Release date: 1989
- Running time: 97 minutes
- Country: Soviet Union
- Language: Russian

Zerograd (Russian: Город Зеро, romanized: Gorod Zero), also translated as City Zero, Zero City or Zero Town, is a 1989 Russian mystery film directed by Karen Shakhnazarov, described as an absurdist comedy by Mosfilm. A Moscow engineer Alexey Varakin visits a factory in a small town on a business trip, where his bizarre adventures begin. At the factory he sees a naked secretary, but nobody seems to pay attention to this; later he encounters a prosecutor who wants to commit a crime and other strange characters, then finds out that he cannot leave the town.

== Plot ==
Alexei Varakin is an engineer from Moscow, on a business trip to a nameless town in the Soviet Union. When Alexei arrives at the factory, the pass he requested is missing. Inside, the manager's secretary is working naked, but nobody seems to mind. The manager is unaware of the chief engineer's death. During lunch at an empty restaurant, Alexei is offered a cake shaped like his head, which he refuses. The cook who made the cake is upset and commits suicide.

After giving his statement to the authorities, Alexei tries to leave town but finds all train tickets sold out. His desperation to return to Moscow only intensifies, his pleas falling on deaf ears. A taxi driver takes him to a remote place with an underground local history museum, where the museum's caretaker, shows Alexei a diverse exhibition spanning different cultures and time periods, including artifacts from the Trojans, Romans, and Soviet leaders.

Alexei stops overnight at the home of a local electrician, whose son Misha confidently tells him that he will never leave the town, surprising Alexei by giving detailed information about his life and future plans. Later, a local driver named Anna offers to drive Alexei to the Perebrodino station for Moscow-bound trains. A black police 'Volga' car intercepts them. The local investigator informs Varakin that his biological father was a deceased cook named Nikolayev and reveals that his real name is Mahmud. The town's prosecutor, who secretly harbors a desire to commit a crime, reveals to Varakin that what was believed to be a suicide was actually a premeditated murder.

Anna takes Alexei to a summer house belonging to poet Vasily Chugunov, where he learns that the cook Nikolayev used to be a famous rock'n'roll dancer in their town. Later that evening, they attend the opening of the Nikolayev Rock'n'Roll Fans Club, where prominent members of the town are also present. Before the dance party begins, Chugunov proclaims this event as another triumph for democracy. Meanwhile, the prosecutor, whom Alexei had previously talked to, attempts to shoot himself with his service gun, but it misfires several times.

As the night grew dark, a group from the dance party, led by Alexei, decides to visit the renowned 1,000-year-old oak tree that was believed to grant power to those who dared to cut its branches. The tree is now dying, but they still collect its branches as souvenirs. The prosecutor offers Alexei a chance to escape, and after running through a forest, he finds an abandoned boat without oars and goes in it with the river flow.

== Cast ==
- Leonid Filatov as Alexey Varakin
- Oleg Basilashvili as writer Vasily Chugunov
- Vladimir Menshov as prosecutor Nikolay Smorodinov
- Armen Dzhigarkhanyan as factory director Pavel Palych
- Yevgeny Yevstigneyev as keeper of the local history museum
- Aleksei Zharkov as police detective
- Pyotr Scherbakovru as head of the city executive committee
- Elena Arzhanik as secretary
- Tatyana Khvostikova as Anna, car driver
- Yury Sherstnyov as waiter Kurdyumov

== Reception ==
On Rotten Tomatoes the film has an approval rating of 83% based on 6 reviews, with an average rating of 6.8/10.

According to Sergey Kara-Murza, the absurdist dreamy "Zerograd" directed by Shakhnazarov (the son of one of Mikhail Gorbachev's main assistants) succinctly and ably outlines the destructive program of Perestroika, including methods of nonviolent influence on mass consciousness, paralyzing the will to resist and save. The film can be considered as an encrypted scenario, according to which the collapse of the USSR took place. Kara-Murza outlined the conspiracy theory of the director's secret plan in the book "Manipulation of Consciousness", where he gave a detailed interpretation of the events in the film. Cryptography as a political tool, Kara-Murza pointed out, has been used in works of art for many centuries. Shakhnazarov himself initially did not recognize Kara-Murza's version, denying such an insidious background and considering his film to be just an apolitical entertainment comedy-farce with elements of absurdity, but then agreed that the film had outgrown the original idea.

Derek Smith (Slant Magazine), in a review for the 2025 Blu-ray re-release, drew a number of parallels with the works of Franz Kafka, Aki Kaurismaki, Roy Andersson and David Lynch and called "Zerograd" a "distinctly Russian film" from the perspective of its worldview and ideas about the plasticity of national history: "Karen Shakhnazarov’s absurdist satire Zerograd captures the disorientation and terror of gradually coming to realize that you live in a reality you no longer recognize."

=== Awards ===
- The film was selected as the Soviet entry for the Best Foreign Language Film at the 62nd Academy Awards, but was not accepted as a nominee.
- 1989: Gold Hugo at 25th Chicago Film Festival for best international feature film
- 1989: Silver prize in the full feature film section at the 34th Valladolid International Film Festival
