= Aleksandr Belyavsky (actor) =

Soviet/Russian actor

Alexander Belyavsky
- Александр Белявский
- Born: 6 May 1932; Moscow, Russian SFSR, Soviet Union
- Died: 8 September 2012 (aged 80); Moscow, Russia
- Occupation: Actor
- Years active: 1957–2008

Alexander Borisovich Belyavsky (Russian: Алекса́ндр Бори́сович Беля́вский; 6 May 1932 – 8 September 2012) was a Soviet/Russian actor who appeared in more than one hundred films. Belyavsky was also the first presenter of the popular TV Show The 13 Chairs Tavern. In 1988, he was designated a Meritorious Artist of Russia; in 2003, he was named a People's Artist of Russia.

== Biography ==
Alexander Belyavsky was born in Moscow, to Boris Moiseyevich Belyavsky and his wife Lyubov Alexandrovna. He was the family's eldest child, with two younger siblings. After finishing school in 1949, he enrolled in the Geological research faculty of the Moscow's Gold and Non-ferrous Metals Institute where he studied up until 1955, making frequent trips to the Central Asian Soviet republics for professional practice. After graduation, Belyavsky spent several years in Irkutsk, working for the East-Siberian Geological department. He made his debut as an actor at the Irkutsk Drama Theatre, playing Molchalin in Alexander Griboyedov's Woe from Wit. Back in Moscow, Belyavsky continued working as a geology engineer, occasionally taking part in amateur theatrical productions staged by The Teachers' House. He decided then to quit his regular job, enrolled into the Boris Shchukin Theatre Institute, and joined Vladimir Etush's class at the Vakhtangov Theatre. In the summer of 1957, Belyavsky made his debut on screen in Tales About Lenin (as a young worker Kolya). Three years later, still a student, he appeared in the Kiev Studio's film Save Our Souls (1960).

In 1961, Belyavsky graduated the Shchukin Theatre Institute with honors and was invited to join the Moscow Satire Theatre. In 1964, the Polish director Leonard Buczkowski cast him in the film Przerwany lot (Aborted Flight). While working in Warsaw, Belyavsky learned the Polish language and later appeared in five more Polish films, including the popular TV wartime thriller series The Four Tankmen and a Dog (as a Soviet captain Pavlov). In 1964, he left the Satire Theatre but never severed ties with its troupe, having become the co-director (with Georgy Zelinsky) and the first presenter of the popular TV series Pub "13 Chairs". It was Belyavsky who came up with the idea of staging a satirical TV series ridiculing a good-for-nothing 'firm' (apparently based in Poland), members of which meet at the tavern to discuss their (highly ridiculous) problems and perform Polish (later West European) pop songs in a karaoke-style.

In 1964, Belyavsky joined the Stanislavsky and Nemirovich-Danchenko Theatre, then moved in 1966 to the Theatre-Studio of a Cinema Actor. All in all he appeared in more than one hundred films (working in Poland, East Germany, North Korea, Finland, France, Czechoslovakia, United States), one of his best-known roles being that of villainous Fox in Stanislav Govorukhin's The Meeting Place Cannot Be Changed (1979). In the 1990s, Belyavsky hosted several TV shows; he played Leonid Brezhnev in Igor Gostev's Grey Wolves (1993). In 1999, he returned to the theatre and in 2003 was awarded the title of The People's Artist of Russia.

In December 2003, Alexander Belyavsky suffered a stroke which left him incapacitated. On September 8, 2012, he was found on the ground by the house where he lived, having fallen, apparently, from the staircase window between the 5th and the 6th floor of the house he lived in. The initial police reports implied it was suicide; later it was suggested the fall might have been accidental. Alexander Belyavsky was buried in Kuzminskoye Cemetery in Moscow.

== Private life ==
Alexander Belyavsky was married twice. In his first marriage, to Valentina Viktorovna, he fathered a son, Boris (born on March 22, 1973, drowned aged two) and daughter Nadezhda (born in 1976). With his second wife Lyudmila Tikhonovna, they had a daughter, Alexandra, born on August 28, 2003, just three months prior to his suffering a stroke. After Boris's death, they adopted another son, who committed suicide after being told by neighbors that Alexandr and Lyudmila are not his biological parents.

== Selected filmography ==
- Stories About Lenin (Рассказы о Ленине, 1958) - electrician Nikolai
- Spasite nashi dushi (1960) - Yuriy Tsymbalyuk
- Quite Seriously (Совершенно серьёзно, 1961) - journalist (segment "Inostrantsy")
- Noch bez miloserdiya (1962) - Henry Davis
- It Happened in the Police (Это случилось в милиции, 1963) - Lieutenant Ganin
- Yolanta (1963) - Duke Robert
- Przerwany lot (1964) - Wowa
- Going Inside a Storm (Иду на грозу, 1966) - Sergei Krylov
- Czterej pancerni i pies (Четыре танкиста и собака, 1966, TV Series) - Captain Ivan Pavlov
- Ikh znali tolko v litso (1967)
- Net i da (1967) - Stronskiy
- July Rain (1967) - Volodya
- The Mysterious Monk (Таинственный монах, 1968) - Stronski
- 24-25 ne vozvrashchaetsya (1969) - Imant Herbert
- Glavnyy svidetel (1969) - Matvey Novozhilov
- Dzień oczyszczenia (1970) - partyzant Sasza
- Tsena bystrykh sekund (1971) - Oleg Vorobyov
- Talanty i poklonniki (1973) - Grigoriy Antonych Bakin
- Failure of Engineer Garin (Крах инженера Гарина, 1973, TV Mini-Series) - Vasili Shelga
- Svet v kontse tonnelya (1974) - Rzhaviy
- Dorogoy malchik (1974) - Kondrashin
- Pod kryshami Monmartra (1975)
- Kogda drozhit zemlya (1975) - Prokofyev
- The Irony of Fate (Ирония судьбы, или С лёгким паром!, 1975, TV Mini-Series) - Sasha
- Ocalic miasto (1976) - Cpt. Syemyonov
- 100 gramm dlya khrabrosti (1977) - Nachalnik laboratorii
- Rallijs (1978) - Man with a mouthpiece
- Pravo pervoy podpisi (1978) - Bit-Part
- Father Sergius (Отец Сергий, 1979) - master of the ferry
- Test pilota Pirxa (1979) - (uncredited)
- The Meeting Place Cannot Be Changed (Место встречи изменить нельзя, 1979, TV Mini-Series) - Yevgeniy Fox
- V nachale slavnykh del (1980)
- The Youth of Peter the Great (Юность Петра, 1980) - Lev Naryshkin
- At the Beginning of Glorious Days (В начале славных дел, 1980) - Lev Naryshkin
- Na Granatovykh ostrovakh (1981)
- Say a Word for the Poor Hussar (О бедном гусаре замолвите слово, 1981, TV Movie) - governor
- Anxious Sunday (Тревожное воскресенье, 1983) - Istomin
- Trevozhnyy vylet (1984)
- Zudov, vy uvoleny (1984)
- Na druhom brehu sloboda (1985)
- One Second for a Feat (1985) - Chistyakov
- Povod (1986) - otets Kosti
- Golova Gorgony (1987)
- Tsyganka Aza (1987) - (voice)
- Proisshestviye v Utinoozyorske (1988)
- Interdevochka (1989) - (voice)
- Právo na minulost (1989)
- Entrance to the Labyrinth (Вход в лабиринт, 1989, TV Mini-Series) - Mayor of Naousen
- Private Detective, or Operation Cooperation (Частный детектив, или Операция "Кооперация", 1990) - Major Cronin
- Nevozvrashchenets (1991)
- Ocharovatelnye prisheltsy (1991)
- Promised Heaven (Небеса обетованные, 1991) - Mirov
- Tractor Drivers 2 (1992) - Nazar Duma
- Three Days in August (1992)
- Ispolnitel prigovora (1992)
- Serye volki (1993) - Leonid Ilyich Brezhnev
- Lepiej byc piekna i bogata (1993) - Edmund Edmontowicz
- Vopreki vsemu (1993)
- Auktsion (1993) - Sergey
- Marquis de Sade (1996) - Judge de Bory
- Demobbed (ДМБ, 2000) - Rear Admiral
- Tikhie omuty (2000) - Boris Ivanovich
- Przedwiosnie (2001) - Jastrun
- The Sum of All Fears (2002) - Admiral Ivanov
- Antikiller (Антикиллер, 2002) - King
- Chernaya metka (2003) - Chlen Politbyuro #1
- Moscow Heat (Московская жара, 2004) - Vlad's grandfather
- The Irony of Fate 2 (Ирония Судьбы. Продолжение, 2007) - Dyadya Sasha
- Kiss not for the press (Поцелуй не для прессы, 2008) - governor (final film role)
