= Failure of Engineer Garin =

- Крах инженера Гарина
- Written by: Sergei Potepalov
- Directed by: Leonid Kvinikhidze
- Starring: Oleg Borisov; Aleksandr Belyavskiy
- Music by: Vladislav Uspenskiy (original score); Yuri Serebryakov (conductor); Galina Gorbonosova (sound design)
- Country of origin: Soviet Union
- Original language: Russian

Production
- Cinematography: Vyacheslav Fastovich
- Editor: Alexandra Borovskaya
- Running time: 247 minutes
- Production company: Lenfilm

Original release
- Release: 1973

Failure of Engineer Garin (Russian: Крах инженера Гарина, translit. Krakh inzhenera Garina) is a 1973 Soviet television film in four parts loosely based on a novel Hyperboloid of Engineer Garin by Alexei Tolstoy. Produced by Lenfilm by the order of Gosteleradio of USSR

== Plot ==
Set in the 1920s, the story begins when Soviet authorities discover the body of engineer Pyotr Garin, seemingly murdered at an abandoned dacha near Leningrad. Clues suggest he was working on a powerful "heat ray," a theory supported by strange discoveries at the crime scene. Soon, it's revealed that the real Garin has escaped overseas while his friend, disguised as him, was the one killed. The Soviet Academy of Sciences sends physicist Shelga to find Garin and convince him to return. Meanwhile, Garin has completed his heat ray, a device capable of burning through objects at great distances. He plots to become a world leader by using the device to drill into South America's deep gold reserves. In need of funding, Garin persuades American industrialist Rolling, initially skeptical, to back his plan. After outmaneuvering gangsters sent by Rolling and recruiting Rolling's lover, Zoya, to his side, Garin secures the financing he needs. Rolling himself uses the heat ray to destroy a competitor's chemical plant, confirming the device's destructive potential.

As the power of Garin's heat ray attracts the interest of Nazi-aligned factions, including Rolling's secretary, Sheffer, secret plots to steal the device emerge. Garin's invention also draws the attention of German industrialist Dietz, who sends his nephew to negotiate, but tragedy strikes when his nephew is murdered. Eventually, Shelga finds Garin but is gravely injured in an ambush. The Nazis release Shelga, hoping he'll lead them to the heat ray. Garin invites Shelga aboard his yacht, planning to sail with Rolling and Sheffer to South America, but Shelga fails to convince Garin to abandon his scheme and bring the device back to Russia. In a final confrontation on a volcanic island, Sheffer sabotages the yacht, stranding everyone. Shelga tries to persuade Garin to destroy the device, but Garin refuses, nearly killing Shelga. As the Nazis close in, Sheffer orders Garin to kill Shelga, but Garin's final use of the ray triggers a disaster: it breaks the volcanic crater, unleashing a flood that sweeps everyone into the sea. Only one sailor survives, stumbling onto a shore littered with the dead.

== Cast ==
- Oleg Borisov as Pyotr Garin
- Aleksandr Belyavskiy as Vasili Shelga
- Vasili Korzun as Rolling
- Nonna Terentyeva as Zoe Montrose
- Vladimir Tatosov as Tyklinski
- Mikhail Volkov as Sсhefer
- Alexander Kaidanovsky as Dr. Wolf
- Grigori Gaj as Reicher
- Anatoli Shvedersky as Ditz
- Algimantas Masiulis as Sсhtufen
- Igor Kuznetsov as doctor
- Valentin Nikulin as Portier
- Yefim Kopelyan as Gaston, the 'Duck Nose'
- Vitali Yushkov as Arnoud
- Gediminas Karka as episode
- Aleksandr Demyanenko as episode
- Vladimr Kostin as Investigator
- Ernst Romanov as Khlynov
- Gennady Saifulin as Victor Lenoir

== Composite filming techniques ==
To create the visual effect of objects being sliced by the hyperboloid beam, an original miniature filming technique was employed. Model elements intended to appear illuminated in red were coated with the highly reflective "Scotchlite" material, known for its directional reflection properties. A half-transparent mirror was set at a 45° angle in front of the motion picture camera PSK-29, reflecting light from a spotlight fitted with a red filter onto the model. This setup achieved red illumination only on specific parts of the model corresponding to the "beam cut," as other objects did not reflect the spotlight's beam. This method is similar to front projection but differs in that no actors were present in the filmed space.

== Literature ==
- Alexander, I. N. (1974). "Rationalization Proposals at 'Lenfilm' in 1973". Cinema and Television Technology (Техника кино и телевидения) (7): 66–67. ISSN 0040-2249.
- Revich, V. "The Collapse of 'The Collapse'." // Soviet Screen (Советский экран), no. 5, 1974, p. 7.
- Revich, V. A. "We Are Thrown into the Unbelievable." In Science Fiction Collection (Сборник научной фантастики), edited by R. G. Podolny, vol. 29, pp. 196–210. Moscow: Znanie, 1984.
- Fyodorov, A. V. "‘The Hyperboloid of Engineer Garin’: Novel and Its Film Adaptations in Media Education for University Students." // Media Education (Медиаобразование), no. 3, 2012, pp. 101–110.
- Fyodorov, A. V. Analysis of Audiovisual Media Texts (Анализ аудиовизуальных медиатекстов). Moscow: Information for All (Информация для всех), 2012, pp. 24–30.
