= The Meeting Place Cannot Be Changed =

1979 Soviet film by Stanislav Govorukhin

- Russian DVD cover
- Russian: Место встречи изменить нельзя
- Based on: The Era of Mercy by Arkady and Georgy Vayner
- Written by: Arkady and Georgy Vayner
- Directed by: Stanislav Govorukhin
- Starring: Vladimir Vysotsky; Vladimir Konkin; Zinovy Gerdt; Armen Dzhigarkhanyan
- Music by: Yevgeny Gevorgyan
- Country of origin: Soviet Union
- Original language: Russian

Production
- Cinematography: Leonid Burlaka
- Editor: Valentina Olejnik
- Running time: 390 minutes
- Production companies: Odessa Film Studio, Second Creative Association

Original release
- Release: 10 November – 15 November 1979

The Meeting Place Cannot Be Changed (Russian: Место встречи изменить нельзя, romanized: Mesto vstrechi izmenit nelzya) is a 1979 Soviet five-part television-film directed by Stanislav Govorukhin and starring singer-songwriter Vladimir Vysotsky in one of his final screen appearances alongside actor Vladimir Konkin. The script, written by Arkady and Georgy Vayner, is based on the plot of their novel The Era of Mercy.

The setting is post-war Moscow. An investigation into the "Black Cat" gang is carried out by officers of the anti-banditry division of the Moscow Criminal Investigations Department, headed by police captain Zheglov. The film's plot echoes the real story of the Krasnogorsk gang of Ivan Mitin, who were involved in robberies, assaults, and murders in Moscow and the Moscow Oblast in the early 1950s.

Filming took place in 1978–1979 at the Odessa Film Studio and in Moscow. The film's premiere, timed to coincide with Police and Internal Affairs Servicemen's Day, occurred on 11–16 November 1979 on Soviet Central Television. The press received the film positively, praising the acting and directorial work while noting the moral issues presented in the story, primarily associated with the ethical confrontations between Zheglov and Sharapov. Among the film's critics, the Vayner brothers, who disagreed with directorial decisions, asked to have their names removed from the credits. Later, at the brothers' initiative, their names were re-added.

While the film did not receive any awards, its creators received honorary certificates from the USSR Ministry of Internal Affairs, and Vysotsky received three posthumous awards for playing the role of Captain Zheglov: in 1981, a special diploma and a jury prize at the 9th All-Union Film Festival in Yerevan; in 1987, a USSR State Prize; and in 1998, the Russian Ministry of Internal Affairs Prize. Vladimir Konkin was also awarded the Russian Ministry of Internal Affairs Prize in 1999 for his role as Sharapov.

The Meeting Place Cannot Be Changed became a cult film in the USSR. Alongside Seventeen Moments of Spring (1973), it shaped popular culture for several generations of Russian-language viewers. Lines from the film have become commonplace catchphrases and aphorisms. The series was released in the West as The Age of Mercy, after the original novel by the Vayner brothers on which it is based.

== Plot ==
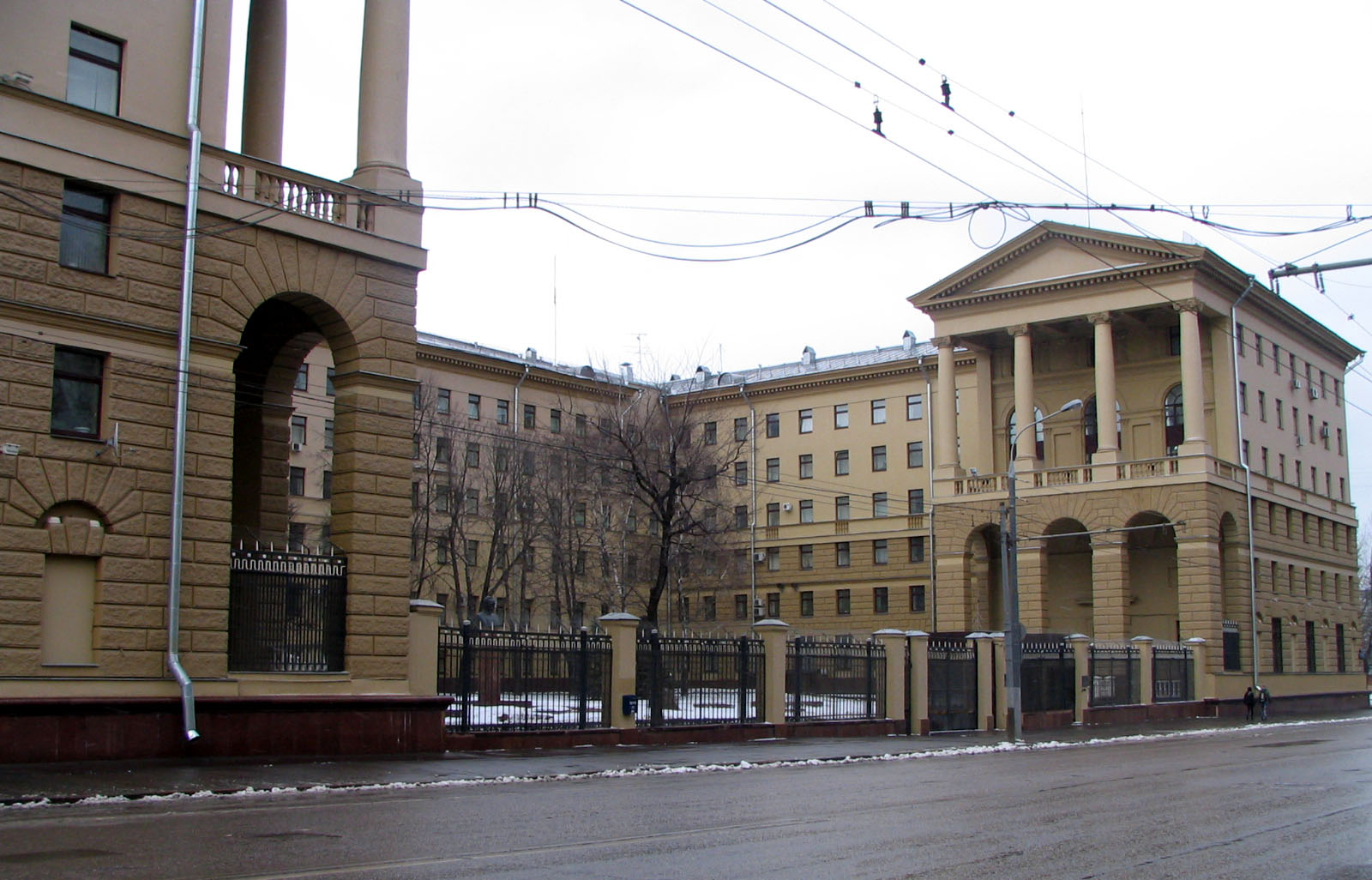
The building on Petrovka Street, 38, where the Moscow Criminal Investigations Department is based

The story takes place in Moscow from August to November 1945.

=== First part ===
Senior Lieutenant Vladimir Sharapov (Vladimir Konkin) is a young reconnaissance officer who has just returned from the front. He is assigned to serve in the Moscow Criminal Investigations Department (MUR) and meets the head of the anti-banditry department, Captain Gleb Zheglov (Vladimir Vysotsky), and other officers. On his first day of service, Sharapov joins an active undercover operation against the elusive Black Cat that goes wrong when a policeman dies before his eyes.

In addition to hunting for the Black Cat, Zheglov's department handles a variety of cases. During a shift, they are the first to arrive at another crime scene: a young woman, Larisa Gruzdeva, has been murdered and robbed, and the case falls to them. Zheglov is certain that the crime was committed by Larisa's husband, Dr. Ivan Gruzdev (Sergey Yursky). During a search of his rented apartment, the pistol used to kill Larisa is found.

=== Second part ===
The task force arrives at the scene of a robbery in progress at a food warehouse by the Black Cat gang. The bandits manage to escape and Sharapov misses one of the criminals: a man wearing a military uniform and an Order of the Patriotic War.

In addition, Zheglov and Sharapov continue to investigate the murder of Larisa Gruzdeva. All evidence points to her husband being the murderer, but Sharapov begins to doubt that the investigation is on the right track.

While on duty, Sharapov meets junior sergeant Varvara Sinichkina (Natalya Danilova): the two take a foundling boy to an orphanage, and a romantic interest develops between them.

Among the representatives of the criminal world that Sharapov meets during a raid is the prostitute Manka Obligatsiya (Larisa Udovichenko). The bracelet of the deceased Larisa is found on her hand. Thanks to the information received from Manka, Zheglov and Sharapov track down the thief Kirpich (Stanislav Sadalsky); in a conversation with the officers, he mentions the name of a bandit unknown to them — Fox.

=== Third part ===
The capture of Fox (Alexander Belyavsky) is now one of the team's main tasks. During a search of Verka the milliner, in whose apartment Kirpich won Gruzdeva's bracelet from Fox, other things belonging to the murdered Larisa are found. Zheglov stations two officers in the house to ambush Fox. However, the carefully thought-out plan is thwarted by Fox's insolence and the cowardice of policeman Solovyov. Nevertheless, the investigation continues. At the Bolshoi Theater, Zheglov and Sharapov detain the thief Ruchechnik (Yevgeny Yevstigneyev) and his partner Volokushina (Yekaterina Gradova), who reports that Fox has a "contact phone". Sharapov receives additional information regarding Fox, such as a description of his appearance, from Fox's former mistress, Ira Sobolevskaya (Natalya Fateyeva), who is also a friend of the murdered Larisa. Sharapov begins to suspect that Fox is the same bandit he missed during the warehouse robbery, which means that Larisa's murder is connected to the Black Cat gang.

Sharapov and Varvara are getting closer while tensions are starting to build between him and Gleb. Despite Gleb's experience and his unquestionable authority, Sharapov doubts some of his methods of conducting investigative work, which leads to conflicts.

=== Fourth part ===
Sharapov decides to double-check the facts obtained on the day of Larisa Gruzdeva's murder. Rechecking the testimony, he discovers that the gun, which is the main evidence against Gruzdev, was probably planted in his rented apartment. At the same time, other details are revealed that point to Gruzdev's innocence. Zheglov, while generally accepting Sharapov's arguments, nevertheless insists on the need to continue to detain Gruzdev since his release may alert the real murderer. Meanwhile, the officers develop a plan to capture Fox in the Astoria restaurant. The entire task force, posing as vacationers, spends time in the restaurant when Sharapov recognizes Fox. Fox senses an ambush and tries to escape, but he fails to evade the pursuit. During the police lineup, Zheltovskaya, Gruzdev's new wife, reports that she had seen Fox before: he had appeared in their house disguised as a plumber on the day of Larisa's death. Gruzdev is released, but Zheglov, convinced that "there is no punishment without guilt," refuses to apologize to him.

Having taken the fingerprints of the driver Yesin, Fox's accomplice, who was killed during the arrest, reveals that he killed Vasya Vekshin, who was trying to get in touch with the Black Cat gang. Fox's connection with the gang has been proven, but he himself, adhering to the concept of "thief in law", refuses to cooperate with the investigation.

Sharapov and Zheglov develop an operation to introduce Sharapov into the Black Cat gang disguised as a petty criminal who allegedly met Fox in a pre-trial detention center.

=== Fifth part ===
According to Zheglov's plan, Sharapov, posing as thief Vladimir Sidorenko, must contact Fox's mistress, Anya. However, the plan unexpectedly misfires: Sharapov is captured by members of the gang and, having broken away from the operatives following them, is brought to the lair of the Black Cat gang. Speaking to the gang leader, hunchback Karp, nicknamed Gorbaty (Armen Dzhigarkhanyan), Sharapov manages to convince the gang of his own "criminal past" and that they need to rescue Fox, who will be delivered the next day to the store they robbed earlier to conduct an "investigative experiment".

Unexpectedly, among the gang members, Sharapov recognizes his front-line comrade, penal soldier Sergei Levchenko (Viktor Pavlov). Levchenko, who sees through Sharapov's ruse and recognizes that he is luring the gang into a trap, nevertheless does not give him up. At night, Levchenko invites him to leave the lair. Sharapov refuses and suggests that Levchenko leave himself, but he also refuses.

Meanwhile, Zheglov, realizing that "the meeting place cannot be changed," begins to prepare the store for the bust. It is successful: Sharapov is saved, and the Black Cat gang is neutralized. However, Levchenko, taking advantage of the moment, tries to escape. Despite Sharapov's protest, Zheglov shoots Levchenko and kills him, not at all regretting that he "killed a bandit."

After the bust, a depressed Sharapov goes to the maternity hospital, but learns that someone adopted the foundling he once delivered. He goes to Varvara, who greets him at the window, holding the baby in her arms.

== Cast ==
- Vladimir Vysotsky as Gleb Zheglov
- Vladimir Konkin as Vladimir Sharapov
- Sergei Yursky as Ivan Gruzdev
- Viktor Pavlov as Sergey Levchenko
- Natalya Fateyeva as Ira Sobolevskaya
- Leonid Kuravlyov as Valentin Bisyaev ("Val'ka Kopchyony")
- Svetlana Svetlichnaya as Nadya, Larisa's sister
- Aleksandr Belyavsky as Evgeny Fox
- Yevgeny Yevstigneyev as Pyotr Ruchnikov ("Pet'ka Ruchechnik")
- Armen Dzhigarkhanyan as Karp ("Gorbatyiy")
- Valeriya Zaklunna as Klavdiya, Karp's girlfriend
- Zinoviy Gerdt as Mikhail Bomze, Sharapov's neighbour
- Natalia Danilova as Varvara Sinichkina (voiced by Natalia Rychagova)
- Yevgeny Leonov-Gladyshev as Vasily Veshkin, the operative murdered in the first episode
- Ivan Bortnik as "Promokashka", bandit
- Larisa Udovichenko as Mariya Kolyvanova ("Manka Obligatsiya")
- Stanislav Sadalsky as Konstantin Saprykin ("Kostya Kirpich")
- Yekaterina Gradova as Svetlana Volokushuna, Ruchechnik's accomplice
- Vladimir Zharikov as Tyagunov, bandit
- Aleksandr Abdulov as Loshak, bandit driver
- Natalya Krachkovskaya as singer in the restaurant

== Production ==
=== Literary screenplay and director's statement ===
Meeting Place was based on the novel The Era of Mercy, written by Arkady and Georgy Vayner in 1975. The plot is loosely based on true events but has almost nothing to do with the deeds of the real Black Cat gang. The real members of this gang — mostly teenagers — were detained in the late 1940s after an unsuccessful apartment burglary. Nevertheless, the myth of elusive criminals who left drawings of cats existed in post-war Moscow for quite a long time. The Vayner brothers borrowed only the group's name and symbols from this story. The Krasnogorsk gang of Ivan Mitin is much closer to the gang in the novel. According to Georgy Vayner, "although Sharapov is a collective image, he also has a prototype — Volodya Arapov, who later became the head of the MUR department. He participated in the capture of the famous Mitin gang, which we personified as the Black Cat." The storyline connected with the arrest of Ivan Gruzdev is also inspired by real events - his prototype was the candidate of medical sciences Yevgeny Mirkin, who was arrested in 1944 on suspicion of murdering his wife. Only after the verdict was passed did evidence emerge that Mirkin was innocent.

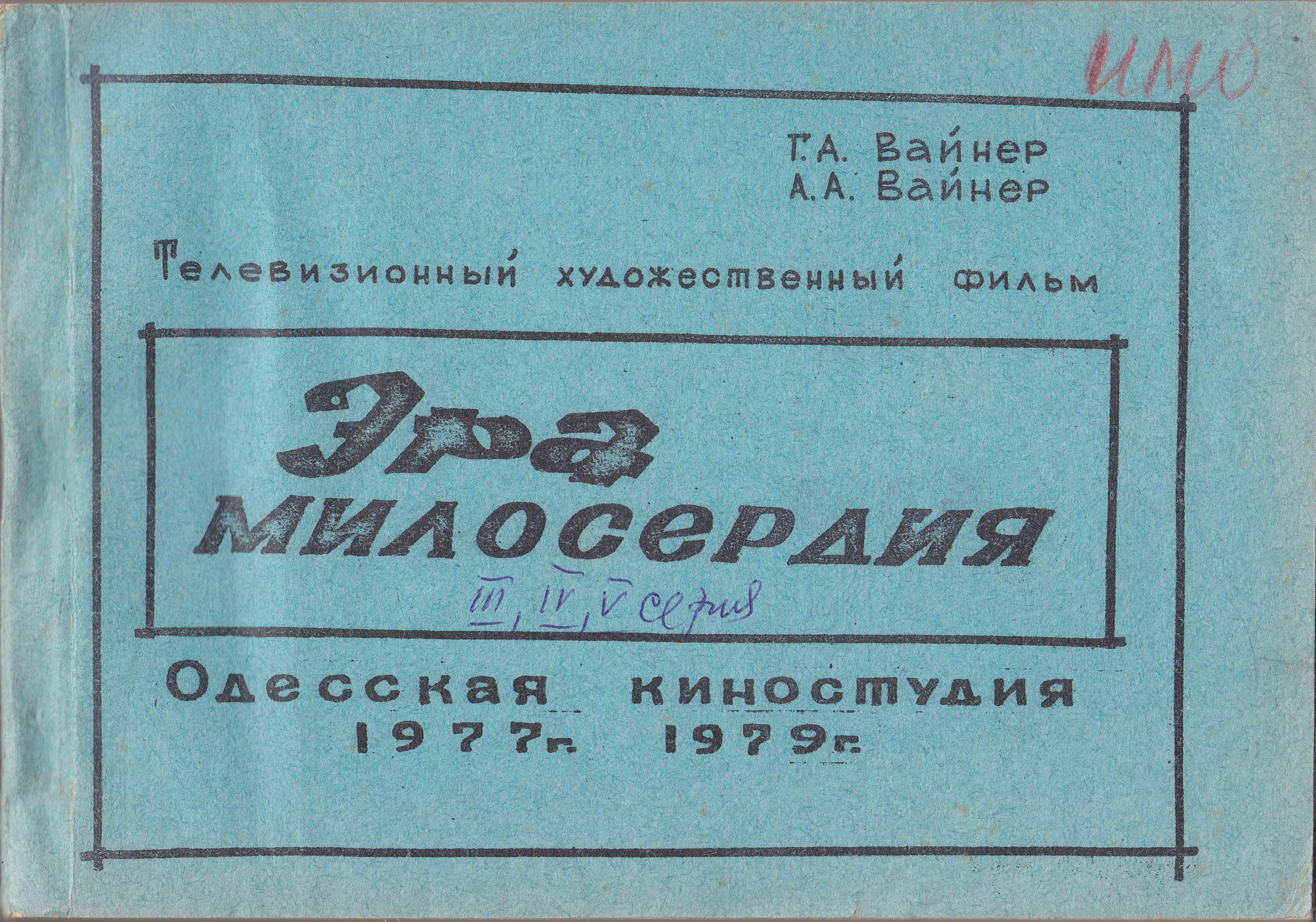
Cover of the director's script of the film

There are different versions associated with the idea of the film adaptation of The Era of Mercy. According to Arkady Vayner's memoirs, after the release of the book, he and his brother gave several copies to close friends. Among them was Vladimir Vysotsky. After reading the novel, Vysotsky told the Vayners that it was a ready-made basis for a future film in which he would like to stake out the role of Zheglov for himself. Stanislav Govorukhin stated a different interpretation of the events, claiming that it was he who recommended Vysotsky to read the Vayners' work.

After The Era of Mercy was included in the Odessa Film Studio's plan, the search for a director began. Initially, the script-editorial board planned to involve Villen Novak; later, Aleksey Batalov was considered as a candidate. However, neither were able to direct due to their busy schedules on other films. Vysotsky proposed Govorukhin for the position of director. The Vayners supported his candidacy after Govorukhin promised the writers in a personal meeting that he would not change "a single line, a single word" in their script without their consent.

Work on the script took place in Peredelkino. From time to time, Vysotsky would visit, offering his own ideas on the development of certain episodes; it was he who suggested a new dramatic move - to place an enlarged photograph of Varvara Sinichkina on the storeroom door. The script image of Zheglov was created taking into account Vysotsky's nature and type. In the novel, Zheglov is a dark-skinned, strong young man, "his shoulders do not fit in his jacket"; in the script, Zheglov had "different external characteristics". During the script-writing, the title of the film also changed. The production title was The Era of Mercy, but Govorukhin suggested The Black Cat, which was turned down. The final title was already used in 1975, during the first publication of the novel in the magazine Smena; the title is a reference to the final episode, where Sharapov's botched attempt to withdraw after making contact with the gang forces Zheglov to follow a previously discarded plan for a risky undercover operation. Hoping that Sharapov will lure the bandits to the scene of a prior robbery as they have previously rehearsed, Zheglov utters: "The place and time of the operation cannot be changed."

=== Director's script ===
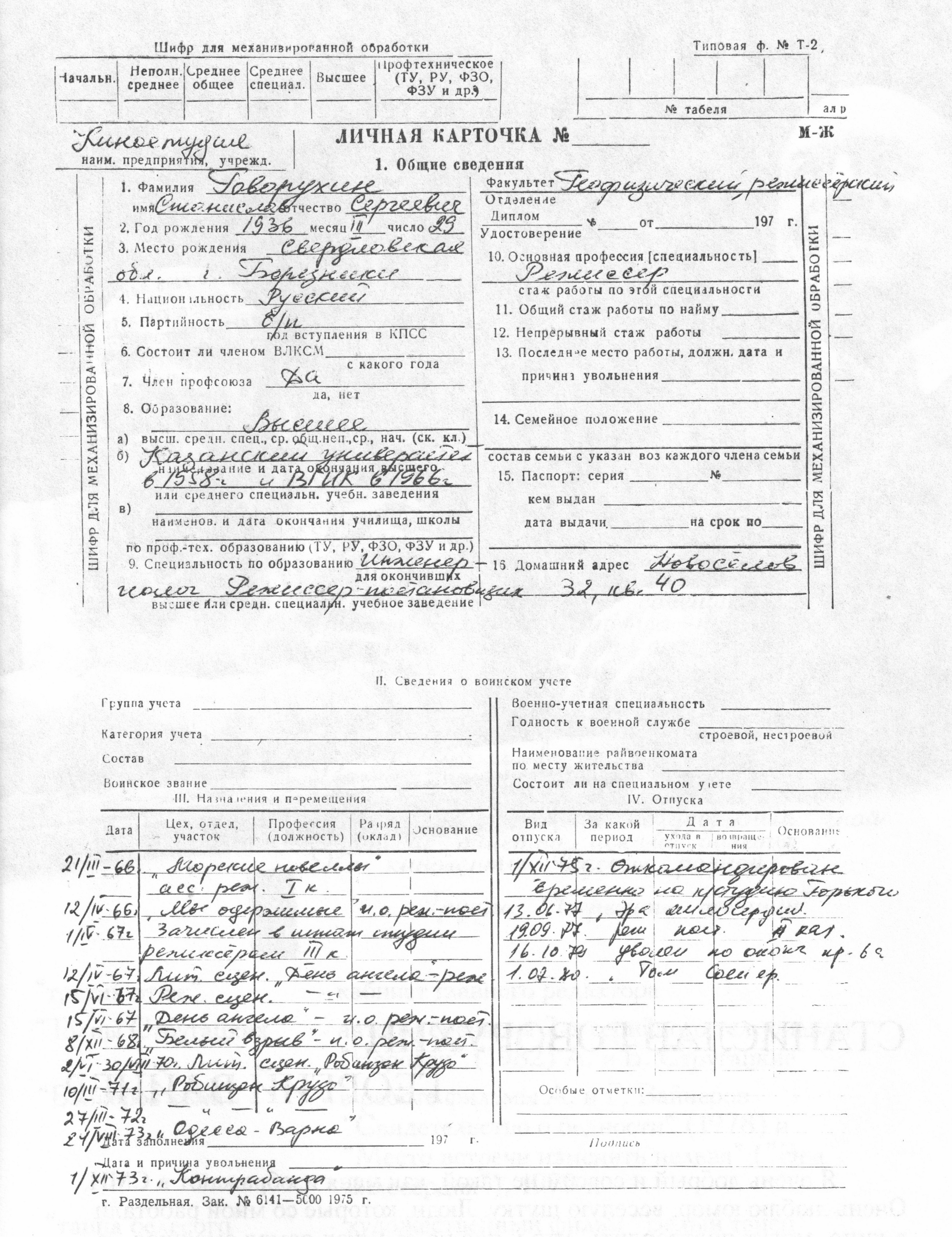
Stanislav Govorukhin's personal card at the Odessa Film Studio

The Vayner brothers' script, approved by the Odessa Film Studio in June 1977 and then sent to Soviet Central Television for review, was more of a literary than a dramatic work. As Galina Lazareva, editor of the Odessa Film Studio, recalled, its volume and plot lines did not fit into the parameters of film production. The comments and recommendations received after a meeting on The Era of Mercy in Odessa and Moscow were taken into account by Stanislav Govorukhin when preparing the director's script, a technical document with an exact indication of the necessary resources and materials for filming. According to the director's script, 33 leading actors (from Sharapov to Larisa Gruzdeva's sister, Nadya), 31 supporting actors, and more than eighty people appearing in episodes were to be involved in the film. Govorukhin calculated how much film would be needed for filming on location, in a studio, and on interior sites (for example, in the Bolshoi Theater, a billiard room, and a radio committee). The director also prepared a full storyboard for the film.

In the director's script, each episode had its own title: "Black Cat," "Familiar Faces," "Betrayal," "Operation Savoy," and "The Meeting Place Cannot Be Changed." Some episodes from the Vainers' script were completely rewritten; for example, in the original version, Sharapov, upon learning of the death of his girlfriend Varvara, dialed the information service and asked for the phone number of the Grauerman Maternity Hospital. This ending did not suit Sergey Lapin, the chairman of the State Committee of Television and Radio Broadcasting of the Soviet Union, who commissioned the film. According to Lapin, the mood of viewers at the beginning of another work week could be darkened by the news of Varvara's death. The finale of the director's script looked different: "Varya stands at the window with a snowy landscape behind it, holding a baby in her arms. She looks at Sharapov with anticipation and tenderness. […] There are tears in Varya's eyes."

The Vayners' literary script included voice-over by Sharapov; this internal monologue was partially preserved in the director's script in the form of flashback scenes. However, during editing, the creators of the film decided to abandon this element, considering that the screen story itself was quite convincing and did not need additional commentary. The director's script for the film was approved by the Odessa Film Studio on 14 December 1977. Two months later, it was signed for printing and published in the city printing house in a print run of 150 copies.

=== Screen tests and casting ===
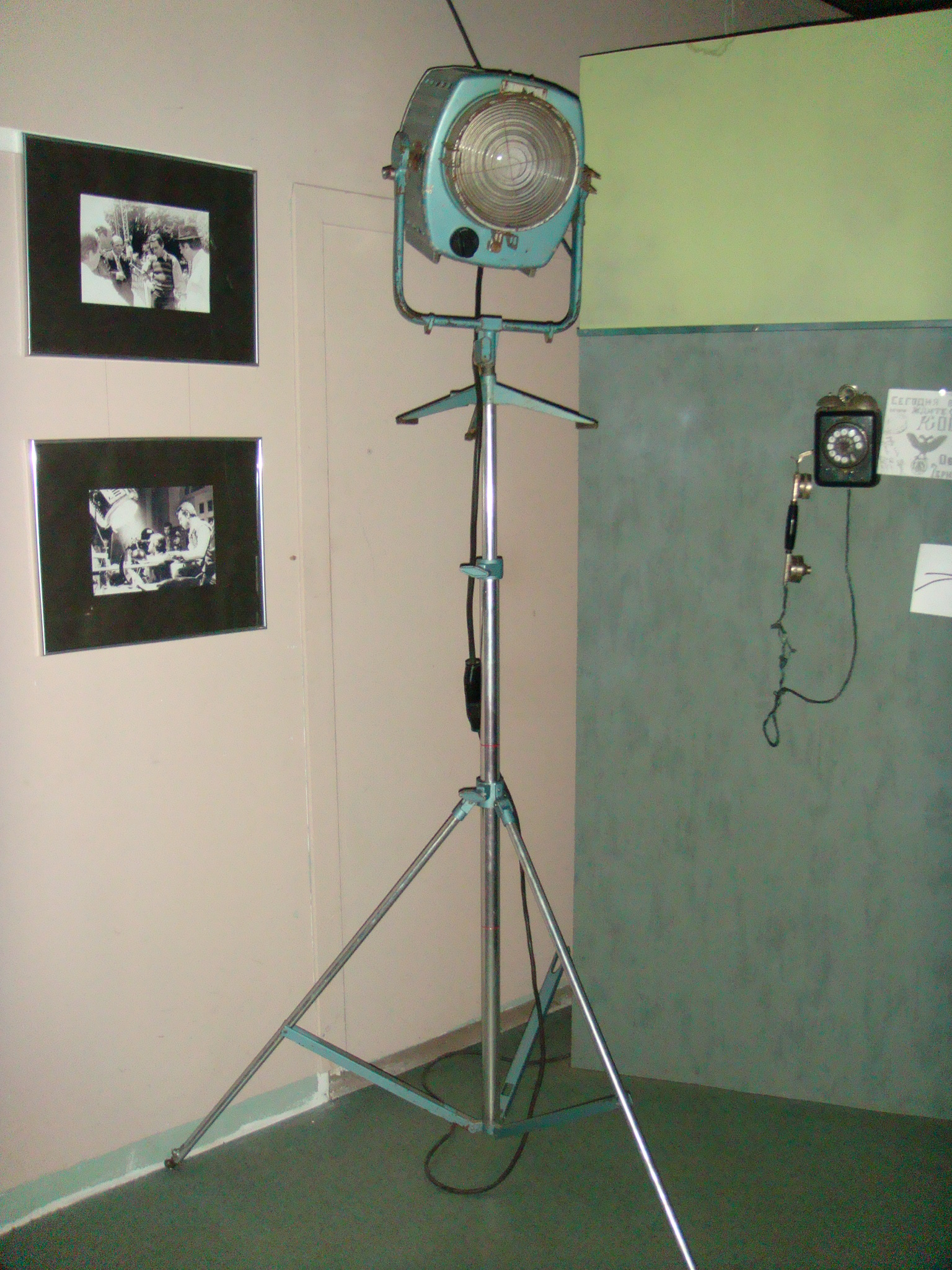
Lighting equipment used during filming at the Odessa Cinema Museum

Although Vysotsky immediately staked out the role of Zheglov with the Vayner brothers, the scriptwriters also considered other actors during the discussions — for example, Sergey Shakurov and Nikolai Gubenko were considered as possible candidates. Govorukhin, trying to approve Vysotsky for the role of the MUR captain, invited actors he considered inferior to the screen tests. Thus, the candidates included Yevgeny Stezhko, Yuriy Kuzmenkov, Anatoly Popolzukhin, and Leonid Yanovsky. Stezhko, who played the role of Lieutenant Toporkov in the film, confirmed in his memoirs that he was warned by Govorukhin in advance before the test shooting for the role of Zheglov: “You have no chance, this is Vysotsky’s role. We just need competition.” The director's plan was a success - after reviewing the audition tapes, the film studio management recognized Vysotsky as the most convincing candidate and approved him for the role.

Govorukhin intended to invite Nikolai Gubenko for the role of Sharapov, but he encountered protest from Vysotsky, who believed that their types and acting styles were too similar. They invited Yevgeny Gerasimov, and although he liked the script, he had already agreed to star in Mikhail Ptashuk's film Time Chose Us, so he refused the role of Sharapov, which he later regretted. Then Vladimir Konkin appeared as a candidate, initially meeting active resistance from the Vayner brothers. In their minds, a former intelligence officer, who went behind the front line forty-two times and often returned "with his tongue on his shoulder", could not look like Konkin did. But here too Govorukhin organized the auditions in a biased way - the ten alternative actors he proposed were inferior to the original candidate: they were "worse and weaker". Realizing that this image of Sharapov "was stuck forever" in the director's head, and that resistance to this candidate could destroy Govorukhin's creative spirit, the Vayners agreed. Already during filming, Govorukhin remembered Leonid Filatov: "This would be the Sharapov I wanted from the very beginning - not inferior to Zheglov in strength, not giving in to him. Only a strong man can be a partner for a strong man."

Boris Khimichev was initially invited to play Fox, but during the work it turned out that his type did not suit Govorukhin. On the advice of Vysotsky, Khimichev was replaced by Alexander Belyavsky. Vsevolod Abdulov, who was in serious condition after a car accident, was approved for the role of policeman Solovyov without competition. Govorukhin and Vysotsky, who visited the actor in the hospital, left him a script and offered him a choice of roles. Abdulov, who had difficulty remembering the lines of his role (due to the consequences of the accident), chose Solovyov. Vysotsky suggested that Viktor Pavlov play Levchenko, a former front-line soldier who became a bandit: "Agree... you will do the role as you see it." Despite the fact that the role was small, Pavlov agreed. Govorukhin offered Ivan Bortnik, who was turned down the role of Sharapov, to play the role of a bandit nicknamed Promokashka. He also invited Svetlana Svetlichnaya to participate in the film. Nina Ilyina and Natalya Chenchik auditioned for the role of prostitute Manka Obligatsiya; Govorukhin offered Larisa Udovichenko to play the role of policewoman Varvara Sinichkina. Udovichenko insisted on the role of Manka, and Chenchik got the role of False Anya. The Vayner brothers pictured Rolan Bykov in the role of the leader of the Gorbaty gang; Bykov agreed and came to the audition in Odessa, but was ultimately unable to accept the role for health reasons. At the suggestion of the film's second director Nadezhda Popova, Armen Dzhigarkhanyan was invited to play this role.

Due to the film's modest budget, Govorukhin cast relatives and friends of film crew members in a number of episodes: Arkady Vainer's daughter, Natalya Daryalova; Govorukhin's wife, Yunona Kareva; Vadim Tumanov's son, Vadim; Arkady Svidersky, Vysotsky's school friend; Vladimir Goldman, Vysotsky's unofficial administrator; Babek Serusha's wife, Nataliya Petrova; Marina Vlady's son, Pyotr; Vysotsky's friend from Bolshoy Karetny Lane, stuntman Oleg Savosin; Taganka Theatre administrator Valery Yanklovich.

=== Costumes, props, and locations ===
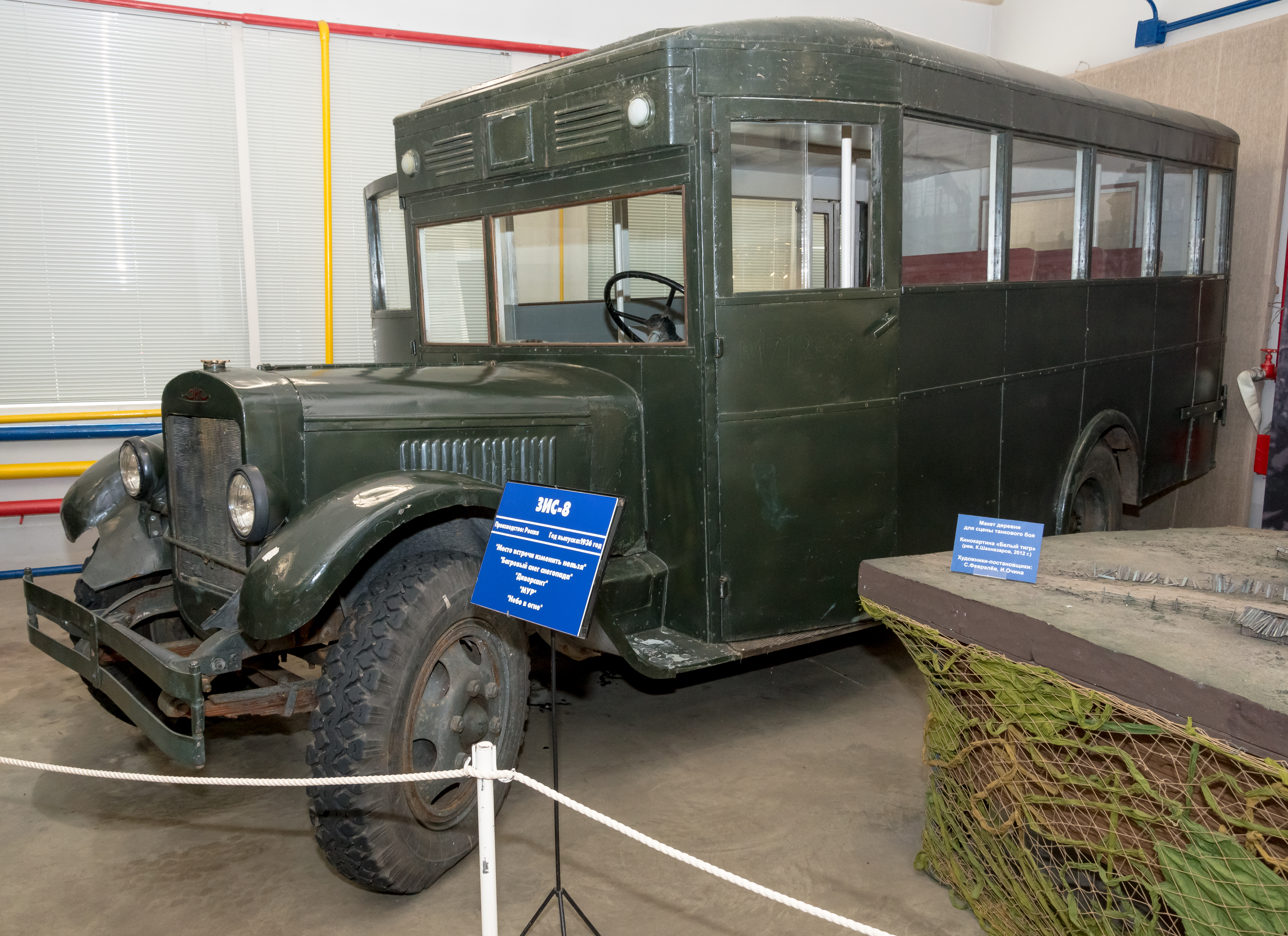
The ZIS-8 "Ferdinand" from the film, in the Mosfilm museum

The appearance of Moscow in the 1970s was significantly different from that of the post-war era: trams no longer ran along Tsvetnoy Boulevard and the TASS building was built on Nikitsky Gate Square. To create authentic landscapes in the film, it was necessary to check all camera movement, as a small deviation could ruin the video sequence. The filming of each on-location scene was preceded by lengthy work, as the prop artists had to hide new signs while adding, decorating, and recreating the necessary pictures. The filming of the scene "The Stolen Fur Coat" took place in the Bolshoi Theater and was complicated by the special security on site. Police Station No. 17, where the detained Kirpich was taken, was filmed on the premises of a Moscow mansion at the intersection of the Garden Ring and Olympic Avenue. The location of the Astoria restaurant was the Central Restaurant on Gorky Street. Some of the outdoor scenes were filmed in Odessa — these include the "Moscow walk-through courtyards" where part of the chase takes place, as well as the robbed warehouse and the billiard room (in the Shevchenko Park). The police workers' Palace of Culture shown in the film was a "combined" location: part of the filming took place in the Moscow Pravda Community Center, and part in the Odessa Officers' House.

The rest of the sets — the communal apartment where Sharapov lived, the basement of the store, Larisa Gruzdeva's apartment, and the MUR offices — were built in the pavilions of the Odessa Film Studio. One of the exceptions was the scene of Ruchnik's interrogation by Zheglov: it was filmed in the interior of a "merchant's apartment" (46 Gorky Street), where a theater group headed by actor and director Vladimir Bogomolov was located during Vysotsky's school years. The film crew created the props corresponding to the era, down to the lump sugar on tables and long cotton shorts that the characters were dressed in. Vysotsky chose the clothes for his character himself. At the costume warehouse of the Odessa Film Studio, with the help of costume designer Akimova, he chose riding breeches, boots, a jacket, an apache shirt, a striped jumper, a leather coat, and a hat. According to Arkady Vayner, Zheglov's outfit was stylistically reminiscent of the clothes of Al Pacino's character in one of the films that Vysotsky liked.

The bread van in which the bandits traveled was a "monument car" - a GAZ-AA from the 1940s; the film crew borrowed it "from a pedestal in Moskhlebtrans". The car was among the first vans to begin delivering bread in Moscow; it was in poor technical condition, and the scene of it driving in front of a train during the chase was filmed with a certain risk. The Studebaker US6 truck was obtained from the Mosfilm studio. The car in the frame was towed - the only equipment that worked was the brakes. To film the scene of the fall into the river, the truck was accelerated "downhill" with the help of a pusher. Mosfilm also provided a ZIS-8 bus nicknamed "Ferdinand", which served as the main means of transportation for the MUR officers.

=== Filming ===
Filming began on 10 May 1978. That same day, Vysotsky's wife, Marina Vlady, asked Govorukhin to find another actor for the role of Zheglov. Vysotsky also asked Govorukhin about this, explaining that immersion in a multi-episode project would take too much of his energy: "Understand, I have so little time left, I cannot waste a year of my life on this role!" Govorukhin flatly refused to change the actor, but promised that if Vysotsky needed to take a long break, the studio would meet him halfway. The gentle regime created for Vysotsky in the film crew allowed him to continue his theatrical activities, perform concerts, and travel, including long trips to Tahiti and North America. According to film scholar Lyubov Arkus, if Zheglov had been played by another actor “with negative charm,” the screens would have simply seen a solid detective story, “the standard dessert of a TV program.” However, "[Govorukhin] decided on a paradox, a risky oxymoron: the Zheglov that was conceived and made in Meeting Place... arbitrarily mixed up the cards, disrupted the layout, created a field in which unpredictable meanings swirled. Does the goal justify the means spent on achieving it? The detective novel by the Vayner brothers assumed a clearly negative answer, [Govorukhin's] film evaded it."

Film scholars noted that individual characters were described in the script very superficially. Nevertheless, the precise choice of performers, as well as the director's dramaturgy, allowed almost each of the actors to create an off-screen biography of their hero. As a result, the detective plot of the film was mixed with elements of a psychological drama. Thus, characters such as the front-line soldier Levchenko, who fell into the gangster environment, the former lover of Fox Ingrid Sobolevskaya, who gravitates towards “ambiguous romances”, the thief Kopcheny, who values life’s pleasures, and the outspoken individualist with a business acumen, the policeman Solovyov, have their own off-screen history. Even in the image of the leader of the Black Cat, Gorbaty, not only gangster cruelty is visible, but also human passions: he values the opinion of his companion Klasha and takes responsibility for the "riff-raff" around him.

The shooting schedule was very strict. As cameraman Leonid Burlaka recalled, if for a rental film the daily norm was 25 meters of film shot, then for a television film it was almost three times higher. At first, Govorukhin's work met with protest from the Vayner brothers, who were not satisfied with the script changes made by the director. The conflict led to their name being excluded from the credits. Later, the Vayners again claimed authorship of the film, and the credits were re-shot at their own expense. In 1984, in an interview with one of the Odessa newspapers, the writers noted that "the talented work of S. Govorukhin made The Meeting Place Cannot Be Changed one of the most serious detective films on our screen."

Young actor Ivan Bortnik (a close friend of Vysotsky) was praised for his vivid and accurate portrayal of the Black Cat henchman Promokashka – the role that dominated his further acting career. Often typecast as a stereotypical Russian criminal, Bortnik is a highly educated man from a family of Moscow academics. He created his iconic part (most of it ad-libbed since the creators had only envisioned a minor supporting role with little dialogue) only by recollecting his occasional street contacts with young criminal wannabes.

Similarly, veteran film and voice-over actor Aleksandr Belyavsky was routinely approached in the street by ex-convicts who expressed admiration for what they thought to be the actor's former criminal background, citing the scene of Fox's interrogation where he is bleeding from his lip and arrogantly wipes the blood on the side of Sharapov's desk. In reality, Belyavsky had no criminal background whatsoever, and he improvised the entire scene by using cherry preserves he had borrowed from production assistants during a lunch break to simulate the blood.

One of the film's best-known comical scenes originated from an acting gaffe. While signing a written affidavit, prostitute Manka "Obligatsiya" asks Zheglov whether her nickname (Russian for government bond) is correctly spelled with an "O" or an "A". Zheglov responds absentmindedly with the correct spelling before realizing what she was asking and directing her to sign her real name instead. Actress Larisa Udovichenko has revealed that the entire moment was unscripted, and she asked about the spelling because she had been unsure, with Vysotsky deciding to play along. Director Stanislav Govorukhin liked the impromptu and included it in the film.

Sharapov's love interest, patrolwoman Varvara Sinichkina, dies at the end of the novel. The ending was altered in the movie because the studio administrator thought it was too depressing. The Vayner brothers later admitted that they liked the new happy ending better.

The series was initially intended to have seven parts, but Soviet broadcast authorities ordered two trimmed. As a result, many scenes were left out of the final cut, and the Vayners struggled to maintain the narrative flow.

==== Vysotsky as director ====
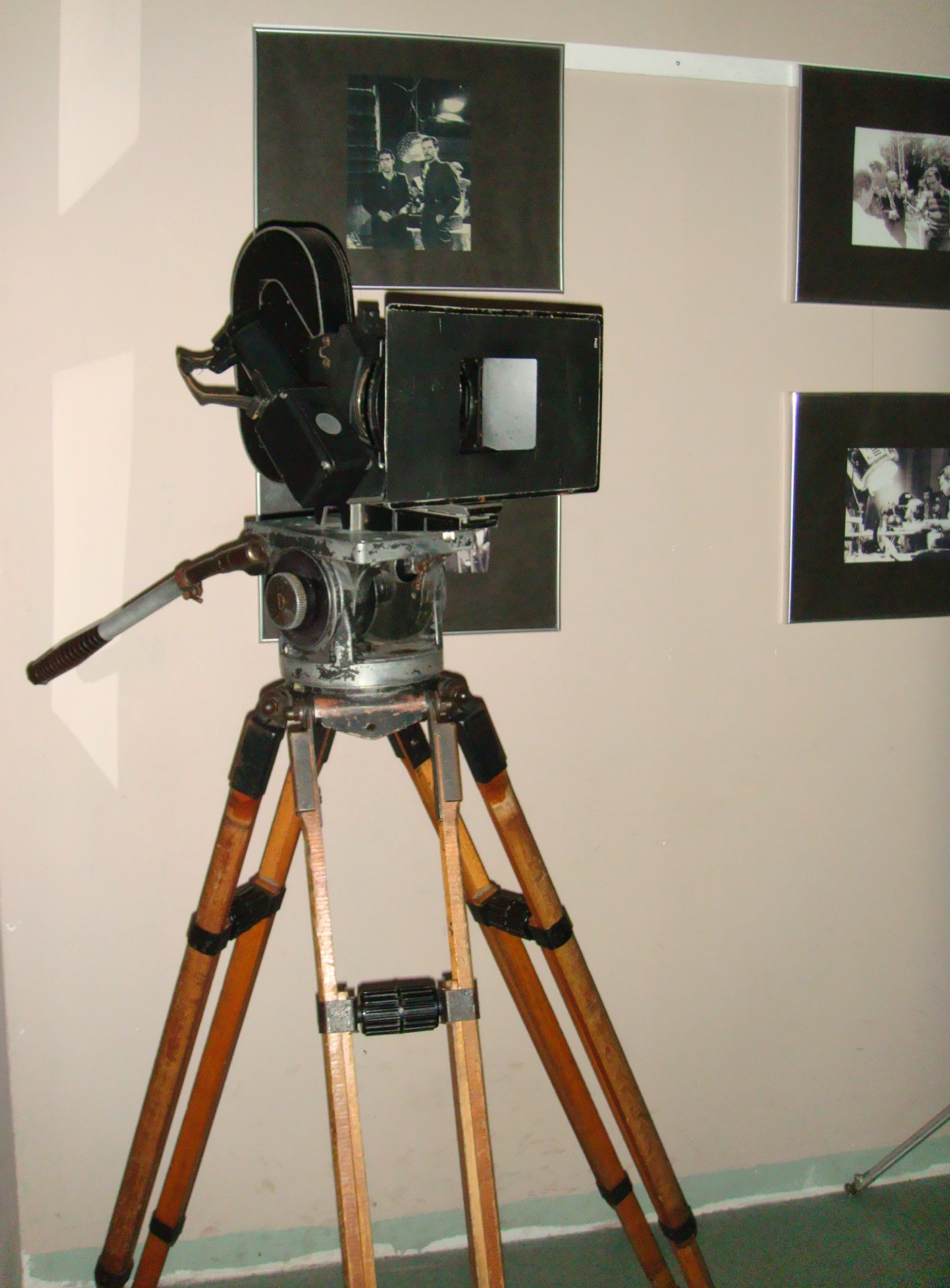
Camera equipment used during filming, exhibited in the Odessa Cinema Museum

In June 1978, Govorukhin left for a film festival in East Germany. During his absence, the functions of the director were assigned to Vysotsky, with whom the director had previously discussed all the details - from the concepts of the scenes to the mise-en-scènes. It was assumed that four hundred meters of film would be enough for Vysotsky for a week, but he shot everything planned in four days. According to the recollections of Vladimir Maltsev, deputy director of the film, Vysotsky's organizational style was radically different from Govorukhin's; Govorukhin was "lordly, slow", and never parted with his pipe - he gravitated toward a leisurely creative process, in which ideas were sometimes born right on the set. Vysotsky had a different approach - he demanded that by the start of the filming shift, all services of the film crew, from lighting technicians to costume designers, be fully prepared for work. He set the tasks clearly, rehearsed quickly, and filmed, as a rule, in one or two takes. As Govorukhin later recalled, the film crew, constantly in a "slight production tension", greeted the returning director with the words: "He [Vysotsky] tortured us!"

Vysotsky filmed the scenes related to Fox's identification and Sharapov's interrogation of the doctor Gruzdev, as well as the scene with the participation of the deceased operative Vasya Vekshin. Yevgeny Leonov-Gladyshev, who played Vekshin, said that Vysotsky suggested dressing his character in a white officer's scarf, which was worn in the post-war years by young people who did not get to the front (these shots were not included in the film). Yunona Kareva, who played Zheltovskaya, admitted that it was difficult for her, as she had no cinematic experience, to be in front of the camera, and only Vysotsky's composure helped her cope with her anxiety. However, Govorukhin, returning from the film festival, was not too pleased with the footage Vysotsky had shot: “Stanislav Sergeyevich didn’t like anything – the way I walked, the way I spoke, how and what they dressed me in.” Govorukhin himself claimed that some of the footage shot by Vysotsky had a “theatrical direction”; nevertheless, these scenes were included in the film: "We didn't have time to reshoot anything, and there was no need."

Vysotsky, as it happened, was the director in most of the scenes I starred in... [...] Therefore, I observed Vysotsky, as they say, in two guises at the same time. And it seems to me that he coped with it remarkably well. This raised his spirits, he was sociable, very easily made compromises.

— Sergei Yursky

==== Stunts and doubles ====
In a number of scenes, the actors were replaced by stunt doubles and stuntmen. During the filming of the scene in the billiard room, where Zheglov talks to Kopcheny, it turned out that neither Vysotsky nor Kuravlyov had ever played billiards before and did not know how to hold a cue correctly, so all the shots for them were performed by one of the local masters — silver medalist of the USSR Billiards Cup Vladimir Ivanov. The scene in which Sharapov performs Frédéric Chopin's 2nd Etude and "Мурка (песня)" in the bandits' lair was also filmed with a double - Konkin did not remember the melodies by heart and could only reproduce them after additional rehearsals. Instead, the studio's music editor Galina Burimenko played the piano, and her made-up hands are in the frame.

The chase after Fox was filmed over twenty days while Vysotsky was away. The scene of him shooting through a broken window was filmed separately later. While breaking the six-millimeter glass of the bus window, Vysotsky noticeably injured his hand, cutting the area from his little finger to his wrist: "If you look closely, you can even see it in the frame, but in the chaos no one paid attention. But after the command: "Stop!" blood flowed straight from his elbow and flooded the seat of the bus." The stunt with the Studebaker truck falling into the river was performed by stuntmen Vladimir Zharikov and Oleg Fedolov. The truck, having broken through the grating of the river fence, unexpectedly turned over and fell into the water with the roof of the cabin. The car sank into a thick layer of silt, and its doors were jammed. This prevented the stuntmen from emerging quickly . According to the film's chief cameraman Leonid Burlaka, they were forced to break through the silt, and the first of the stunt performers appeared on the surface only after forty seconds. The next day, with the help of a crane, they managed to pull the truck out of the water: "We couldn't leave Mosfilm property in the river." The stunt part of the scenes with the waitress, whose body Fox used to break the window in the Astoria, and the traffic controller hit by the car were also performed by Zharikov.

==== Music ====
The main musical theme for the film was created by composer Yevgeny Gevorgyan and his brother, double bass player Andrei. Govorukhin tasked the Gevorgyan brothers and the film's music editor Galina Burimenko with recreating the atmosphere of the time: on the one hand, it was necessary to introduce a “hidden, insinuating” instrumental motif into the context of the film; on the other, to select songs and dance melodies popular in the post-war era (in particular, foxtrots), which were to sound in the background in certain scenes.

Vysotsky suggested using his own works in the film — such as "The Police Lieutenant's Birthday in the Berlin Restaurant" ("Spend a Day in a Policeman's Skin..."), "About the End of the War" ("They Knock Down Tables from Boards in the Yard..."), "The Ballad of Childhood". None of them were included in the film. According to some sources, Vysotsky himself refused to perform them; according to others, this was rejected by Govorukhin, who decided that both the overall dramaturgy and the image of the hero would be destroyed. Nevertheless, in one of the episodes, Zheglov sang a fragment of Alexander Vertinsky's song "Lilac Negro", interspersing the text of the work with remarks addressed to Sharapov.

By the way, the success of this role — and, perhaps, the entire film - was largely ensured by the fact that Vysotsky seemed to play his own early years in it, the atmosphere of his own first songs, with the same "criminal elements" that post-war Moscow was full of. In this sense, Zheglov very organically fit into the poetic interests of the "late" Vysotsky with his lyrical "memoirs".

— Anatoly Kulagin

==== Editing and dubbing ====
The quality of the film material was assessed directly during filming — the film processing shop worked around the clock, checking that the footage did not contain any defects. Meanwhile, the sets were preserved and the actors did not leave the filming site until the technical control department confirmed that the quality of the working positives met the requirements, meaning that re-shooting was not necessary. At the same time, according to Lyudmila Popova (head of the film processing shop), a small part of the successful takes was removed by Govorukhin at the viewing stage for reasons of overall footage.

Despite the exclusion of a number of scenes, footage was eventually obtained for seven full episodes. At the request of the Chairman of the State Television and Radio Broadcasting Company Sergey Lapin, the almost finished film was shortened to 5 episodes. In order to preserve the overall drama, the creators of the film removed not individual plot lines, but small, disparate fragments: some of the "extra material" was saved by increasing the length of the episodes; other cut footage was used as a background for the opening credits preceding each episode. According to the recollections of cameraman Leonid Burlaka, almost everything that the film crew shot was eventually included in the film. Of the significant scenes, only the prologue was removed - Govorukhin himself refused to include it in the film, deciding that the main message contained in the short wordless scene was clear in the context of the plot. The prologue contained front-line footage in which Levchenko and Sharapov make a sortie behind the front line in order to capture a prisoner (the role of the prisoner of war was played by Marina Vlady's son). According to Vladimir Konkin, the episode could dispel the viewer's doubts about the ability of the reconnaissance company commander Sharapov to "drag someone on his back."

The work on dubbing the film was long and painstaking. According to sound engineer Anna Podlesnaya, the scene in the Astoria restaurant was dubbed during the day before the evening filming for about two weeks and took several full work shifts. During the dubbing, Vysotsky preferred to work alone even in paired scenes, believing that his partners could distract him. Govorukhin claimed in his memoirs that Vysotsky's dubbing took a month and was complicated by the fact that Vysotsky "had already lived the role of Zheglov", and therefore the technically complex, non-creative work of dubbing was performed by him with colossal stress. The sound of the film at that time was recorded on a separate film from the image and, like the film, took up seven rolls of film for each episode, with a total length of about two kilometers.

==== Ministry of Internal Affairs consultants ====
Lieutenant General Konstantin Nikitin, then Deputy Minister of Internal Affairs of the USSR Nikolai Shchelokov, and Vadim Samokhvalov, Chief of Staff of the Ministry of Internal Affairs of the USSR, were appointed as consultants for the film. According to the Vainer brothers, their support helped to approve Vysotsky for the role of Zheglov. Even at the stage of familiarization with the script, Nikitin demanded that thieves' jargon be excluded from the dialogues, but Govorukhin "diligently ignored" his numerous comments. Nikitin died before the film was finished; he was replaced by the First Deputy Chief of the Main Investigative Department of the Ministry of Internal Affairs, Major General Vladimir Illarionov. Having met Vysotsky during filming, Illarionov often consulted him in his office in the building of the Investigative Department (11 Dzerzhinsky Street) and provided him with albums from his collection and books on prison and thieves' jargon. It is likely that it is only thanks to the consultants that the film crew was able to shoot the scene of the capture of Ruchnik in the Bolshoi Theater; at that time, it was a facility with a special security regime, and filming inside was allowed only in exceptional cases.

In the 1960s, memories of Nikolai Yezhov's and Lavrentiy Beria's rule in the internal affairs agencies were still fresh in Soviet society. The reluctance to be associated with the "legacy of dark times" was one of the reasons why Vysotsky flatly refused to wear a police uniform in the film. The only scene where he appeared in a military jacket was filmed at the personal request of the Minister of Internal Affairs. According to Illarionov, after the success of "The Meeting Place..." Vysotsky was thinking about a sequel to the film. Having visited the archives of the Ministry of Internal Affairs, Vysotsky explained the backstory of the Order of the Red Star that his character wears in the film:

In the winter of 1942, a train with food was traveling from Sverdlovsk to hungry Moscow. It was guarded by a group of NKVD officers led by a captain. Operational data was received that an armed gang might attack the train that had arrived at the Likhobory station. They decided to remove the wagons with food and put a train with reinforced security in their place. But some kind of hitch occurred. A small group had to fight an unequal fight with the bandits. Subsequently, the captain, who was wounded in the shootout, was awarded the same order as Zheglov.

== Themes ==
Much of the series revolves around the relationship between Zheglov and Sharapov. While the two become close friends and roommates, they are essentially opposites who often clash. At the root of the conflict lies Sharapov's disagreement with Zheglov's "ends justify the means" approach to law enforcement. Zheglov, hardened and cynical from spending the war years in the rear fighting organized crime, thinks that "a thief's place is in prison, and the public couldn't care less about how I put him there". To that end, Zheglov does not hesitate to use dubious tactics, such as planting evidence, to justify the arrest of a notorious pickpocket. Sharapov, on the other hand, considers that the law is a higher value for its own sake and cannot be used merely as a tool. A tense conflict also arises when, to mislead Fox, Zheglov elects to keep Gruzdev under arrest even after it becomes clear that the man is innocent.

== Release ==
The sudden death of the consultant of the Ministry of Internal Affairs, Lieutenant General Konstantin Nikitin, somewhat complicated the submission of the film, since the members of the acceptance committee who came in his place put forward their complaints: "Are you crazy? Do you want the whole Union to talk about thieves and prostitutes for a week?" A dilemma arose: the film was not openly banned but also not accepted. Nevertheless, after a pause, Central Television included the film in the broadcasting schedule, timing the premiere to coincide with Police Day. The first episode premiered on 11 November 1979 on the first channel.

According to Stanislav Govorukhin, who was in Sevastopol at that time, the release of the next episode actually caused the failure of a local mass celebration: "The people ignored the city event and sat in front of their televisions." The first responses from viewers began to arrive immediately after the premiere. The editorial office of the newspaper Sovetskaya Kultura received a detailed letter from miner A. P. Sushko from the Voroshilovgrad Oblast. Sushko reported that with each new episode, the popularity of the film "indescribably increased":

Almost the entire shift at our mine watched the last episode in their best clothes after work hours. Putting aside all their affairs, including personal ones, regardless of fatigue, people eagerly awaited the final part.

== Cultural impact ==
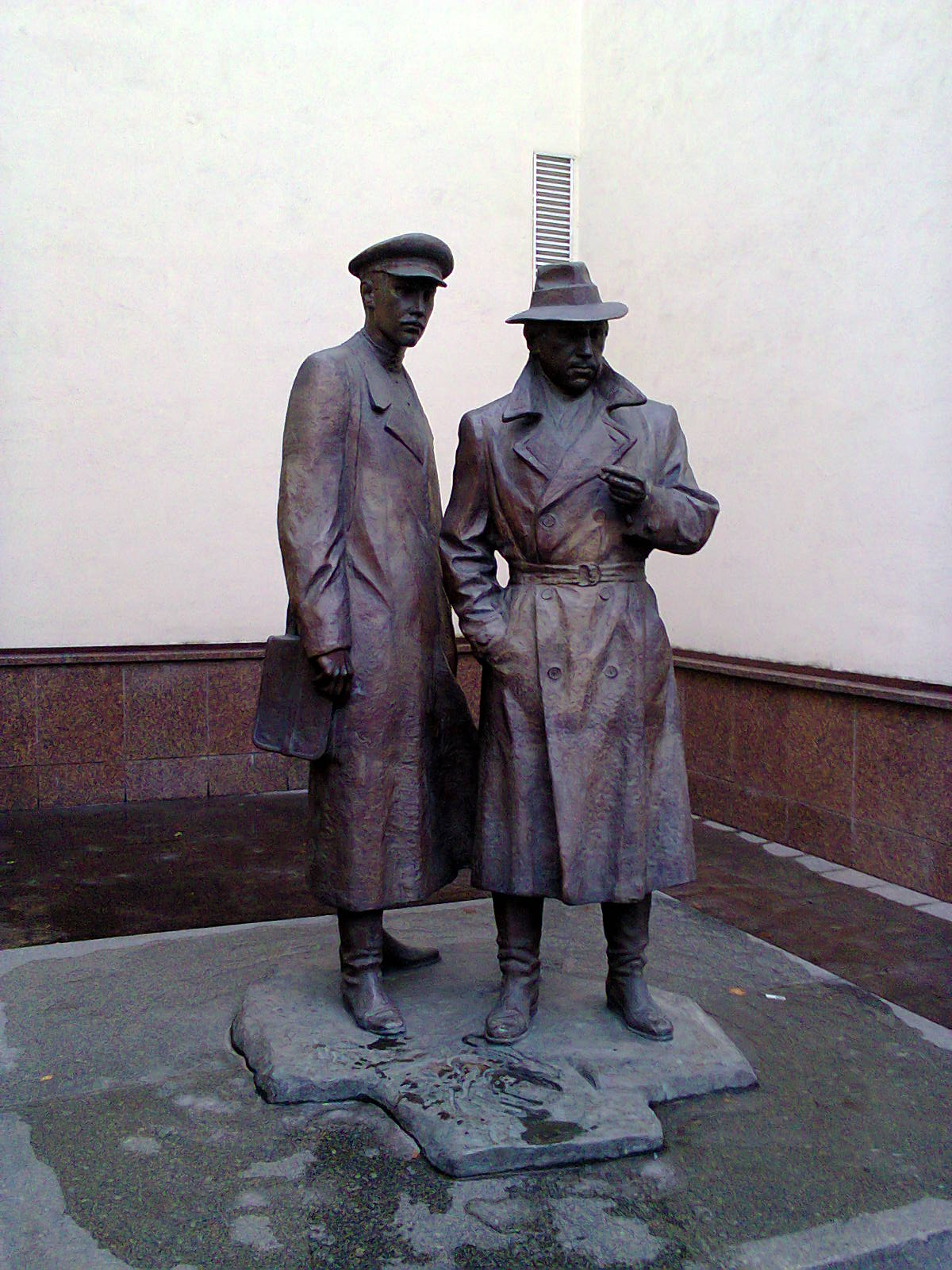
Monument to Zheglov and Sharapov in Odesa

The film's massive popularity made it a major source of Soviet and post-Soviet popular culture.

- Armen Dzhigarkhanyan lampooned his performance as The Hunchback in a 1998 installment of the popular Armenian sketch comedy series Our Backyard.
- In 2010, Russian Prime Minister Vladimir Putin used Zheglov's famous "a thief's place is in prison" line in widely criticized remarks against the jailed tycoon Mikhail Khodorkovsky.
- A sculpture featuring Vysotsky and Konkin (as Zheglov and Sharapov) is installed outside the Internal Affairs Ministry building in Kyiv, Ukraine.
- In 1998, Russian TV star Leonid Parfyonov made a commemorative documentary Meeting Place, 20 Years Later, putting the history of the series' creation in the broader social context of both the plot and the production eras. Parfyonov interviewed members and acquaintances of the cast and crew and actual police detectives and criminals of the 1970s.
- In 1991, Russian rock band Lyube released their debut album "Atas" (Russian: Атас), with the lyrics of the titular song heavily referencing the plot of the movie, primarily focused on the characters of Gleb Zheglov and Vladimir Sharapov and their confrontation with the Black Cat gang.
