= Valentin Nikulin =

Soviet-born actor

- Валентин Никулин
- Born: Valentin Yuryevich Nikulin; 7 July 1932; Moscow, Soviet Union
- Died: August 6, 2005 (aged 73); Moscow, Russia
- Education: Law Faculty of Moscow State University (1957); Moscow Art Theater School (1960)
- Occupation: Actor
- Years active: 1960—2005

Valentin Yuryevich Nikulin (Russian: Валенти́н Ю́рьевич Нику́лин; 7 July 1932, Moscow — 6 August 2005, Moscow) was a Soviet, Russian and Israeli theater and film actor.

Nikulin was born in the family of the playwright Yuri Nikulin (1907-1958) and pianist Eugeniya Brooke (1909-1982); nephew of the writer Lev Nikulin and actors Konstantin Shayne and Tamara Shayne, and a grandson of impresario Veniamin Nikulin.

Nikulin graduated from Moscow State University with a degree in law in 1957 and from the School-Studio at the Moscow Art Theatre (1956–60). From 1960-90, and from 1999 until his death, he was an actor at the Sovremennik Theatre. He also worked in films throughout his career, playing more than hundred roles.

== Filmography ==
- Nine Days in One Year (Russian: Девять дней одного года, 1962) as young physicist
- The Road to Berth (Путь к причалу, 1962) as Marat Lepin
- The Big Ore (Большая руда, 1964) as Vladimir
- Adventures of a Dentist (Похождения зубногo врача, 1965) as patient
- Three Fat Men (Три толстяка, 1966) as Dr. Haspar Arnery
- The Mysterious Wall (Таинственная стена, 1967) as Canadian traveler
- The Brothers Karamazov (Братья Карамазовы, 1969) as Smerdyakov
- Day by Day (День за днём, 1971) as Dima
- Failure of Engineer Garin (Крах инженера Гарина, 1973) as Portier
- The Little Mermaid (Русалочка, 1976) as Sulpitius / Hans Christian Andersen
- The Nose (Нос, 1977) as janitor
- Kind Men (Добряки, 1979) as Orest Ivanovich Muzhesky
- Behind the Blue Nights (За синими ночами, 1983) as Kirill Averichev
- Visit to Minotaur (Визит к Минотавру, 1987) as Andrea Guarneri
- Entrance to the Labyrinth (Вход в лабиринт, 1989) as Fiscal
- Stalin's Funeral (Похороны Сталина, 1990) as neighbor
- Coffee with Lemon (Кофе с лимоном, 1994) as pianist
- The Master and Margarita (Мастер и Маргарита, 1994) as episode
- Yana's Friends (Друзья Яны, 1999) as neighbour
