= Entrance to the Labyrinth =

- Written by: Vayner Brothers
- Directed by: Valeriy Kremnev
- Starring: Igor Kostolevsky; Ivars Kalniņš; Yuriy Nazarov; Zhanna Prokhorenko
- Music by: Eduard Artemyev
- Country of origin: Soviet Union
- Original language: Russian

Production
- Cinematography: Sergei Filippov
- Running time: 345 minutes
- Production company: Gorky Film Studio

Original release
- Release: 1989 – 1989

Entrance to the Labyrinth (Russian: Вход в лабиринт, romanized: Vkhod v labirint) is a 1989 Soviet five-episode television crime film directed by Valeriy Kremnev based on the Vayner Brothers novel Medicine against Fear.

== Plot ==
The film consists of several storylines.

Main one occurs in the USSR in the 1980s - a detective story about scammers who, using a police identification card, break into the apartments of dishonest people and rob them under the guise of a search. When studying this case, investigator Muromtsev discovers a conflict between two inventors of miracle drug metaproptozole, called abroad as "medicine against fear". The professor does not believe in the existence of this drug because he did not succeed in inventing it himself. Therefore, he denies that his opponent Lyzhin, who is considered a kooky eccentric could invent such a drug. However, the criminals manage to poison the district plenipotentiary with this particular drug, after which they abduct the identity card and the government-issue weapons of the district police officer Pozdnyakov.

A parallel story tells about the life and tragic fate of the great physician and philosopher Paracelsus in the 16th century in Europe. In search of a mythical cure for all diseases, he makes discoveries, which form the basis of modern pharmacology. The life of Paracelsus is spent in constant wanderings.

== Cast ==
- Igor Kostolevsky — investigator Oleg Petrovich Muromtsev
- Ivars Kalniņš — professor Alexander Nikolaevich Panafidin (voiced by Sergey Malishevsky)
- Yuriy Nazarov — district police officer Andrei Filippovich Pozdnyakov
- Zhanna Prokhorenko — wife of Pozdnyakov, Anna Vasilyevna
- Tatyana Nazarova — daughter of Pozdnyakov, Dasha
- Larisa Udovichenko — wife of Panafidin Olga Ilinichna
- Alexander Novikov — Boris Chebakov
- Lev Borisov — father of Chebakov
- Yuri Gorobets — Sergey Ivanovich Golitsyn
- Sergey Gazarov — Omar Sharifovich Ramazanov
- Natalya Arinbasarova — Rashida Abbasovna Ramazanova
- Mikhail Gluzsky — Professor Ilya Petrovich Blagolopov
- Natalya Khorokhorina — Ekaterina Fedorovna Pachkalina
- Leonid Kuravlyov — Lev Sergeevich Khlebnikov
- Boris Romanov — Vladimir Konstantinovich Lyzhin
- Kapitolina Ilyenko — neighbor Lyzhina
- Boris Becker — Noah Markovich Khaletsky
- Valentin Smirnitsky — Yakov Okun (voiced by Yuri Sarantsev)
- Evgeny Platokhin — investigator in the Pozdnyakov case
- Igor Statsenko — assistant professor Panafidin
- Marina Ustimenko — Alexandrova
- Klavdia Kozlenko — wife of Kashin
- Tatiana Mitrushina — Okun's wife
- Vladimir Nosik — Spirkin
- Vladimir Troshin — Nikolai Sergeevich
- Semyon Farada — Pontyaga
- Roman Filippov — Nikolai Ignatievich Belavol
- Vladimir Plotnikov — racer
- Mikk Mikiver — Paracelsus (voiced by Rudolf Pankov)
- Aleksandr Belyavsky — Mayor of Naousen
- Yevgeniy Dvorzhetsky — Azriel
- Villor Kuznetsov — Sorensen
- Algimantas Masiulis — Baron Jacob Fugger (voiced by Nikolai Grabbe)
- Donatas Banionis — Mazardi (voiced by Aleksandr Demyanenko)
- George Teich — Erasmus of Rotterdam
- Mati Klooren — Calvin (voiced by Igor Yasulovich)
- Heino Mandri — Baron Hütter (voiced by Rogvold Sukhoverko)
- Valentin Nikulin — Fiscal
- Reino Aren — Froben (voiced by Vladimir Safronov)
- Elena Yaralova — Sylvia
