= Vladimir Konkin =

Soviet/Russian cinema and theatre actor

Vladimir Konkin Владимир Алексеевич Конкин
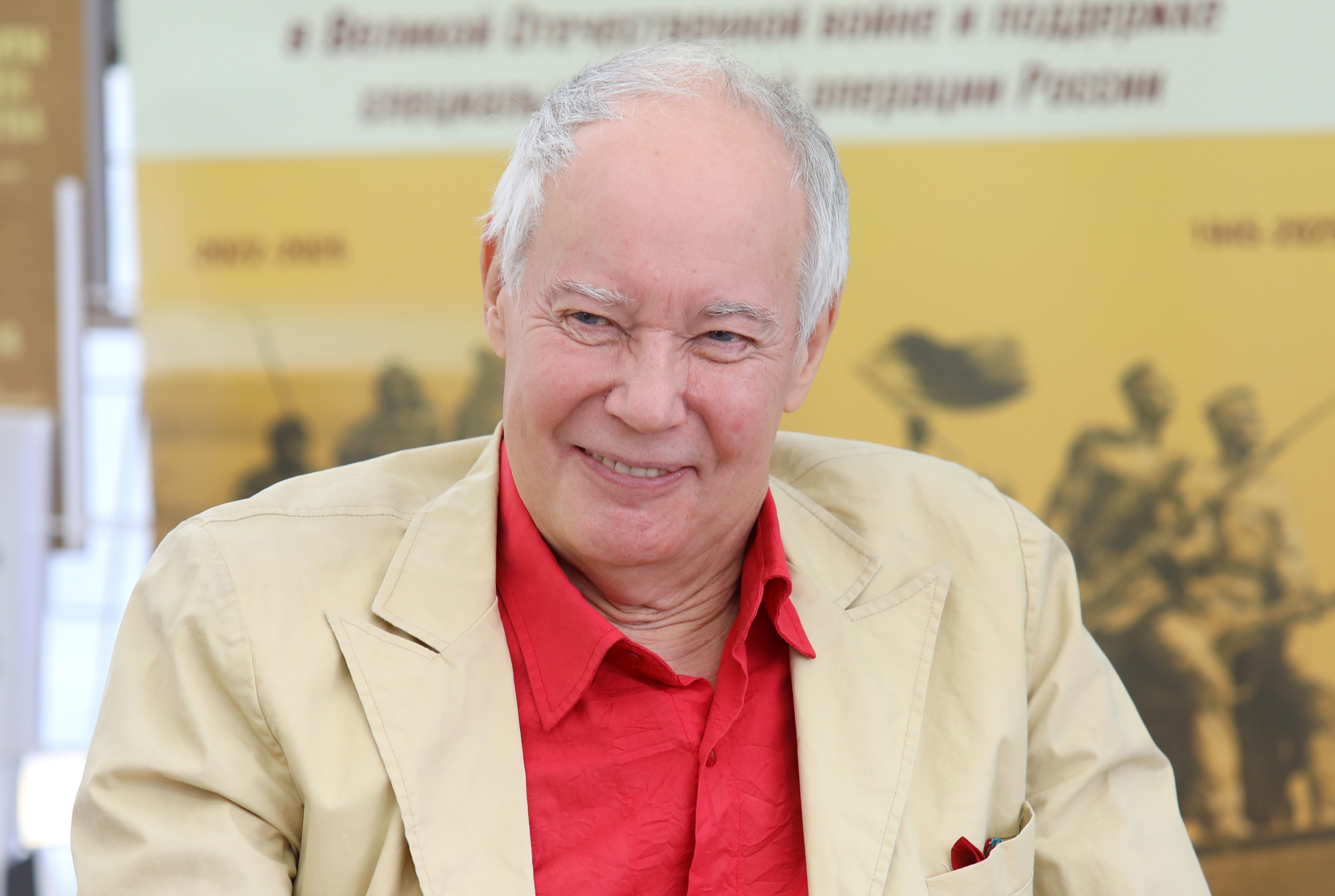
- Vladimir Konkin
- Born: 19 August 1951 (age 75); Saratov, Russian SFSR, Soviet Union
- Education: Saratov Theatre college
- Occupation: Actor
- Years active: 1974–present
- Spouse: Alla Konkina
- Awards: Order of Friendship, Russian Federation Presidential Certificate of Honour Lenin Komsomol Prize, Meritorious Artist of Russia (2010)

Vladimir Alekseyevich Konkin (Russian: Влади́мир Алексе́евич Ко́нкин, born 19 August 1951, Saratov, USSR) is a Soviet/Russian cinema and theatre actor, who appeared in 45 films. He is best known for his roles in How the Steel Was Tempered (1975, Pavel Korchagin) and The Meeting Place Cannot Be Changed (1979, Vladimir Sharapov). Vladimir Konkin, a Meritorious Artist of Russia (2010), is also a published author of short stories and essays.

== Biography ==
Vladimir Konkin was born in Saratov, into the family of a railway engineer who served at the Privolzhskaya Railway. As a schoolboy Vladimir studied at the theatre studio courses of the actress and writer Natalia Sukhostav; upon graduation he enrolled into the Saratov Theatre college, the class of Dmitry Lyadov. In 1972 Konkin joined the Kharkiv Theatre for Children; a year later he moved to the Moscow Mossovet Theatre. Konkin debuted on the big screen in Nikolai Mashchenko's How the Steel Was Tempered (1975), after Nikolai Ostrovsky's autobiographical novel, shot at the Kiev-based Dovzhenko Film Studios. The film made the young actor famous and earned him the Lenin Komsomol Prize. The actor has never lost respect for his character, seeing him as the epitome of moral strength. "I love Korchagin and even today, at 60, I think I would have been on his side," he said in a 2011 interview.

In 1974–1978 Konkin appeared in several successful films, including Andrei Konchalovsky's A Lover's Romance, Boris Ivchenko's Marina, and Georgy Kalatozishvili's The Caucasian Story. Konkin has never served in the Army (due to poor health) but, somewhat ironically, played mostly military men, invariably romantic, mild and intelligent. The part of Sharapov in Stanislav Govorukhin's The Meeting Place Cannot Be Changed (1979) marked the peak of Vladimir Konkin's cinema career. "The character of Sharapov hasn't lost its relevance. Regardless of whether we accept today's 'rules of the game', what we look for is straight honesty in those people who are there to protect us," Konkin asserted in a 2002 interview.

In 1979 Konkin joined the Moscow Ermolova Theatre (where he played young Vladimir Lenin in Kazan University) and continued to appear in films, notably Fathers and Sons (directed by Vyacheslav Nikiforov; as Arkady Kirsanov) and The Adventures of Tom Sawyer (Stanislav Govorukhin, as Doctor Robinson). During the 1980s and 1990s he worked in several theatres, including Taganka Theatre (Zakhar Bardin in Maxim Gorky's Enemies, 1995). In the late 1990s he hosted for a while the Home Library show at ORT. His best-known role in the 2000s was that of Colonel Kobylyansky in the history drama Romanovs. The Crown.

=== Family ===
Vladimir Konkin and his wife Alla Lvovna Konkina spent 39 years together. In 2010 she died of cancer. They had twin sons, Yaroslav and Svyatoslav, and a daughter Sophia, who sadly drowned in a sports club pool on 24 September 2020.

== Awards ==
- The Lenin Komsomol Prize (for the role of Pavel Korchagin in How the Steel Was Tempered) - 1974
- The Interior Ministry of Russia's Prize (for the role of Vladimir Sharapov in The Meeting Place Cannot Be Changed) - 1999
- The Meritorious Artist of Ukrainian SSR - 1974
- The Meritorious Artist of Russia (2010)

== Filmography ==
- Marina (1974)
- A Lover's Romance (Romans o vlyublyonnykh, 1974) - Sergey's younger brother
- As The Steel Was Tempered (Kak zakalyalas stal, 1975) - Pavel Korchagin
- Let’s Move to Love (Perekhodim k lyubvi, 1975)
- Flight from the Palace (Pobeg iz dvortsa, 1975) - Revold
- Black Sea Waves (Volny tchyornovo morya, 1976)
- And Soldiers Were Marching On... (Aty-baty, shli soldaty..., 1976) - Lieutenant Suslin
- The Talent (Talant, 1977)
- Caucasian Tale (Kavkazskaya povest, 1978)
- A Road to Sophia (Put k Sofii, 1978)
- The Meeting Place Cannot Be Changed (Mesto vstrechi izmenit nelzya, 1979) - Lieutenant Sharapov
- Lucia Di Lammermoor (1980) - The composer
- The Adventures of Tom Sawyer (Priklyucheniya Toma Soiera, 1981) - Doctor Robinson
- Father And Sons (Otsy i deti, 1983) - Arkady Kirsanov
- The Night Is Followed by the Day (Za notchyu den idyot, 1984) - Yakov Batyuk
- Bagration (1985) - Prince Menshikov
- Aunt Marusia (Tyotya Marusia, 1985) - Pyotr
- The Singing Russia (Poyushchaya Rossia, )
- The Appellation (Apellyatsia, 1987) - Kholmovoy
- Impatience of the Soul (Neterpenye dushi, 1987)
- Mudromer (1988) - Zalivako
- The Civil Suit (Grazhdansky isk, 1988) - Gorsky
- The Noble Outlaw Vladimir Dubrovsky (Blagorodny razboinik Vladimir Dubrovsky, 1988) - Shabashkin
- Asthenia Syndrome (Astenichesky sindrom, 1989)
- The Last Autumn (Poslednyaia osen, 1990) - Golubev
- The Lift for the In-between (Lift dlya promezhutochnovo tcheloveka, 1990) - Dubrovin
- Worst of All Evil (Ischadye ada, 1991)
- The Black Ocean (Tchornu okean, 1992) - Fokin
- But Is it Good to Sleep With Another Man’s Wife? (A spat s chuzhoy zhenoy khorosho?, 1992) - Shutov
- A Petty Romance (Bulvarny roman, 1994)
- Princess on Peas (Printsessa na bobakh, 1997) - Kostya
- One Has to Start Living Again (Opyat nadi zhit, 1999)
- A Night on the Border (Notch na kordone, 2001) - Painter Stepan Stepanovich
- Romanovs. The Crown Family (Romanovy. Ventsenosnaya semya, 2001) - Coloner Kobylinsky
- The Adventures of a Magician (Priklyuchenya maga, 2002) - Kursky
- The Operational Moniker (Operativny psevdonim, 2003) - Timokhin
- Sarmat (2004) - The criminal investigation officer
- The Time of Cruel Ones (Vremya zhestokhikh, 2004) - Ilyin
- The First Circle (V Kruge Pervom, 2006) - Professor Varenev
- The Lenin's Will (Zaveshchaniye Lenina, 2007, TV series) - Yuri Nikolayevich
