= The Chosen One (1982 film) =

- Russian: Избранные
- Directed by: Sergey Solovyev
- Written by: Alfonso López Michelsen; Sergey Solovev
- Starring: Leonid Filatov; Tatyana Drubich; Amparo Grisales; Raúl Cervántes; Santiago García; Carl West
- Cinematography: Pavel Lebeshev
- Release date: 1982
- Running time: 140 minute
- Countries: Soviet Union; Colombia
- Language: Russian

The Chosen One (Russian: Избранные) is a 1982 Soviet drama film directed by Sergey Solovyev.

The film takes place during the Second World War and tells about a rich German baron who despises the Nazi ideology, but at the same time tries to maintain neutrality. At the end of the war he nails off to Colombia and conducts a dubious financial operation there.

== Plot ==
Set during World War II, the story follows Mr. B.K., a wealthy German baron and businessman played by Leonid Filatov, who despises the Nazi ideology but is forced to navigate life in Nazi Germany. In late 1944, he manages to leave Germany for Colombia, where his brother lives and where his company's main assets are located. In Colombia, he enters the elite circles of wealthy individuals who, despite their status, show little regard for honor or morality. There, he finds love with a kind and simple woman, Olga Rios (Tatiana Drubich). However, B.K.'s life takes a dark turn when he becomes involved in a risky stock trading operation that leads to the loss of his fortune. He is then falsely accused of collaborating with the Nazis, and those around him turn their backs on him as he faces potential imprisonment. It is revealed that B.K. had reluctantly agreed to sign a document pledging cooperation with Nazi intelligence in exchange for permission to leave Germany—a commitment now being used to blackmail him.

Desperate to salvage his position, B.K. commits a grave betrayal, handing over Olga to an influential figure from the American embassy who had once demanded her as a favor. This betrayal leads to her suffering at the hands of the American, but it does nothing to secure B.K.'s fate. In the end, he loses everything: his wealth, his love, and ultimately his life. The film portrays the gradual unraveling of a morally weak man who, devoid of integrity and political foresight, succumbs to his own self-destructive choices.

== Cast ==
- Leonid Filatov as Mister B.K.
- Tatyana Drubich
- Amparo Grisales
- Raúl Cervántes
- Santiago García
- Carl West
