= Nina Shatskaya (actress) =

Russian actress (1940–2021)

- Born: Nina Sergeevna Shatskaya; 16 March 1940; Moscow, Russian SFSR, Soviet Union
- Died: 23 May 2021 (aged 81); Moscow, Russia
- Occupation: actress
- Years active: 1962—2017

Nina Sergeevna Shatskaya (Russian: Нина Сергеевна Ша́цкая; 16 March 1940 – 23 May 2021) was a Soviet and Russian actress, Merited Artist of the Russian Federation (2008). She was known for playing in the films Welcome, or No Trespassing, A Man Before His Time and Visit to Minotaur.

== Biography ==
In 1963 she graduated from the Russian Institute of Theatre Arts. From 1964 to 1993 she was an actress of the Taganka Theatre.

Shatskaya died on 23 May 2021, aged 81, a day after being diagnosed with COVID-19 during the COVID-19 pandemic in Russia.

== Personal life ==
- First husband (1963–1977): Valeri Zolotukhin (1941–2013), actor. Son — Denis (born 1969), orthodox priest.
- Second husband (1982–2003): Leonid Filatov (1946–2003), actor.
