= Moscow Criminal Investigations Department =

MUR's emblem

Moscow Criminal Investigations Department or just MUR (Russian: Московский уголовный розыск, МУР) — is a detective branch within Moscow City Police which was established as Moscow Criminal Detective Department (Московский уголовный сыск, МУС) in 1866.

The Criminal Investigation Department of the Directorate of the Ministry of Internal Affairs of Russia for the city of Moscow is located at the address: 127994, Russia, Moscow, Petrovka Street, Building 38 (see the building of the Directorate of the Ministry of Internal Affairs of Russia for Moscow).

The head of the Criminal Investigation Department of the Main Directorate of the Ministry of Internal Affairs of Russia for the city of Moscow - since February 2018 is Major General of Police Kuzmin, Sergey Nikolaevich.

== History ==
The Moscow CID's roots are from the Moscow detective prikaz (Russian: Сыскной приказ) of the Grand Duchy of Moscow, which was established in 1619, replaced by the interrogation mission (Russian: Розыскная экспедиция) established in 1763. In 1782 the Bureau of Criminal Affairs (Палата уголовных дел) was established and it was the Moscow department of the Russian gendarmerie and in 1866 it was renamed to Moscow Criminal Investigations/Detective Department.

== Recruitment ==
The officers in the Criminal Investigation Department are required to have served for at least two years as a uniformed officer before applying for transfer to the department and receive further training when they are transferred. Muscovite CID officers are involved in investigation of major crimes such as rape, murder, serious assault, fraud, and any other offences that require complex detection. They are responsible for acting upon intelligence received and then building a case.

== See also ==
- The Meeting Place Cannot Be Changed
