= Larisa Udovichenko =

Russian actress (born 1955)

Larisa Ivanovna Udovichenko (Russian: Лариса Ивановна Удовиченко; born 29 April 1955, Vienna, Austria) is a Russian actress. People's Artist of Russia (1998).

== Selected filmography ==
- Die Fledermaus (1979)
- The Meeting Place Cannot Be Changed (1979)
- Little Tragedies (1979)
- I Ask to Accuse Klava K. of My Death (1979)
- Married Bachelor (1982)
- Mary Poppins, Goodbye (1983) as Mrs. Banks
- Dead Souls (1984)
- Dangerous for Your Life! (1985)
- The Most Charming and Attractive (1985)
- Winter Cherry (1985)
- Entrance to the Labyrinth (1989)
- Sons of Bitches (1990)
- What a Wonderful Game (1995)
- The Envy of Gods (2000)
- Kidnapping, Caucasian Style! (2014)
- Peace! Love! Chewing Gum! (2020-2023)
