= Leonid Filatov =

Soviet and Russian actor, director, poet, publicist (1946–2003)

- Леонид Филатов
- Filatov in 1985
- Born: 24 December 1946; Kazan, Soviet Union
- Died: 26 October 2003 (aged 56); Moscow, Russia
- Resting place: Vagankovo Cemetery, Moscow
- Occupations: Film director, actor, poet
- Years active: 1969-2003

Leonid Alekseyevich Filatov (Russian: Леонид Алексеевич Филатов, IPA: [lʲɪɐˈnʲit əlʲɪˈksʲejɪvʲɪtɕ fʲɪˈlatəf]; 24 December 1946 – 26 October 2003) was a Soviet and Russian actor, director, poet, pamphleteer, who shot to fame while a member of the troupe of the Taganka Theatre under director Yury Lyubimov. Despite severe illness that affected him in the 1990s, he received many awards, including the Russian Federation State Prize and People's Artist of Russia in 1996.

== Biography ==
Filatov was born on 24 December 1946, in Kazan. His father was Aleksey Yeremeyevich Filatov (1914—1982), and his mother was Klavdia Nikolaevna Filatova (1923—2007). The family frequently moved around, because his father was a radio operator and spent much time in field expeditions. When Leonid was seven years old his parents divorced, and Leonid moved along with his mother to Ashkhabad to join his mother's relatives. While a schoolboy, he had his first publications in the Ashkhabad press.

After finishing school, he arrived in Moscow in 1965, and tried to become a film director, but failed the entrance exam at the State Institute of Cinematography VGIK. However, Filatov was persistent, and on the advice of a classmate he took the entrance exams to the actor's department of the Shchukin Theatrical School. In 1965 he was admitted to the course of Vera Lvova and Leonid Shikhmatov, and graduated from Shchukin Theatrical School as an actor in 1969.

In 1969 Filatov became an actor with the troupe of the Moscow Taganka Theatre. His first main role was the lead in the stage version of What Is to Be Done? His career developed with roles in The Master and Margarita, The Cherry Orchard, The House on the Embankment, Fasten Your Seatbelts, Pugachev, Antiworlds, Comrade, Believe, the role of Horatio in Hamlet, Kul'chitskiy in The Fallen and Living, Federzoni in Life of Galileo, and Players-21 (a work with (Sergey Yursky's creative association of artists).

From 1985 through 1987, while the Taganka Theatre was under Anatoly Efros, Leonid Filatov worked at the Sovremennik Theatre, then later returned to the Taganka. In 1993 Filatov joined Nikolai Gubenko, Natalya Sayko, Nina Shatskaya and other actors in founding a creative association named Fellowship of Actors of the Taganka (Russian: "Содружествo актёров Таганки").

He was the author of several plays, such as An Artist from Sherwood Forest and Sons of Bitches, among other works.

From 1970 Filatov worked in cinema. His most important roles were in such films as City of First Love, Air Crew, The Voice, Women Joke in Earnest, The Rooks, Success, Chicherin, Forgotten Melody for a Flute, Zerograd, and Charity Ball.

In 1990 he directed the film Sons of Bitches, based on his own scenario, and also played a supporting role. It was entered into the 17th Moscow International Film Festival.

Since 1970 Filatov was writing songs in the co-authorship with Vladimir Kachan.

Leonid Filatov was married to the actress of the Fellowship of Actors of the Taganka Nina Shatskaya. The couple had a son and granddaughters.

== Books ==
- Oranges of a Beige Color
- The Tale of Fedot the Strelets, a satirical play

== Selected filmography ==
- 1970 — City of First Love as Boris
- 1980 — Air Crew as Igor Skvortsov
- 1981 — Could One Imagine? as Mikhail Slavin
- 1982 — The Voice as Mister B.K.
- 1982 — The Chosen One as film director
- 1982 — The Rooks as Viktor Grach
- 1983 — From the Life of a Chief of the Criminal Police as Stepan Petrovich Slepnyov
- 1984 — Success as Gennadi Fetisov
- 1986 — Wild Pigeon as Ivan Naydyonov (voice-over)
- 1987 — Forgotten Melody for a Flute as Leonid Filimonov
- 1988 — A Step as Gusev
- 1989 — Zerograd as Alexei Varakin
- 1990 — Sons of Bitches as Yuri Mikhailovich

== Bibliography ==
- Guseinova, I.A. and Brumfield, W.С. (2016), "Russian Folklore as a Poetics of Inference: (Based on Material from the Fairytale by Leonid Filatov "Fedot the Musketeer, a Brave Lad")", Journal of Siberian Federal University. Humanities & Social Sciences, 9 (9): 2223–2230, doi:10.17516/1997-1370-2016-9-9-2223-2230.
