= Alexander Gelman (writer) =

Soviet-Russian writer

Alexander Isaakovich Gelman
- Born: 25 October 1933 (age 92); Donduşeni, Kingdom of Romania (now in Moldova)
- Spouse: Tatyana Pavlovna Kaletskaya (born 1937)
- Children: Marat Gelman (born 1960)
- Writing career
- Notable awards: USSR State Prize (1976)

Alexander Isaakovich Gelman (Russian: Алекса́ндр Исаа́кович Ге́льман; born 25 October 1933 in Donduşeni), original given name Shunya (Russian: Шу́ня), is a Bessarabian-born Soviet and Russian playwright, writer, and screenwriter.

A survivor of the Holocaust during childhood, Gelman became a playwright and screenwriter after working as a newspaper journalist in Leningrad in the 1960s, winning the USSR State Prize in 1976. He has resided in Moscow since 1978.

A supporter of Mikhail Gorbachev's reforms, Gelman was elected to the Supreme Soviet of the Union of Soviet Socialist Republics in 1989 and to the Central Committee of the Communist Party of the Soviet Union upon Mikhail Gorbachev's recommendation in 1990, before leaving the Communist Party of the Soviet Union less than a year later.

== Biography ==
=== Early years ===
Shunya (later renamed Alexander) Gelman was born in Donduşeni (now in Moldova), a Bessarabian village that had been part of the Russian Empire before it was returned to Romania during the Russian Civil War and Soviet annexation in 1940. His parents were Isaak Davydovich Gelman (1904—1981) and Manya Shayevna Gelman (1910—1942). After the Nazi attack on the Soviet Union in 1941, the occupying German forces deported the Gelman family to the Bershad ghetto in Transnistria, where his mother died. Only Alexander Gelman and his father (from 14 deported members) survived a death march upon leaving the camp near the end of the war.

Gelman graduated from a vocational school in Chernovtsy, Ukrainian SSR in 1951 and attended a naval school in Lvov (Lviv) in 1952–1954 and became an officer in the Soviet Navy, serving between 1954 and 1960 in the Black Sea Fleet's coastal defense and on the Kamchatka Peninsula in the Soviet Far East. He also worked in factories and in construction.

In 1966 he moved to Leningrad, where he worked as a journalist for the municipal newspapers Smena (The Work Shift) and Stroitelny Rabochy (Construction Worker). During this period he started learning and working on screenwriting.

=== Theatrical and movie career ===
In 1970 he co-authored a screenplay (with his future wife Tatyana Pavlovna Kaletskaya). It was later filmed as Night Shift. The next screenplay, also together with Tatiana, led to the movie Xenia, Wife of Fyodor (Lenfilm, 1974), which won an award in a USSR-wide competition.

His career reached an early peak with the 1974 play Protokol odnogo zasedaniya (Minutes of a Meeting, also translated as A Party Committee Meeting) and staged in Leningrad at the Gorky Bolshoi Drama Theater by Georgy Tovstonogov and a year later at the Moscow Art Theatre by Oleg Yefremov; it was filmed in 1975 as Premiya (Salary Bonus). It depicted a construction crew's rejection of a salary bonus on the grounds that they felt cheated by bad management and poor workplace organization. Acclaimed as a sociological drama, the film won director Sergey Mikaelyan and screenwriter Gelman the USSR State Prize in 1976. Many people called Protokol odnogo zasedaniya prophetic, "presaging the strikes of summer 1980 and the workers' movement in Poland."

Other plays are Obratnaya svyaz' [Feedback] (1976), My, nizhepodpisavshiesya [We, the undersigned] (1979), Skameika [The bench] (1983), Zinulya (1984), and Poslednee budushchee [The most recent future] (2010). Boris Kagarlitsky writes of his plays (through the late 1980s):

Gel'man is free from naïve technocratic illusions; he knows economic reality other than by hearsay.... Real people appear on the stage. Instead of Shatrov's faceless technocrats we see live production-workers who turn out to be very different, unlike each other, complex, unexpected.... Gel'man's most recent plays ... localize the conflict, so to speak – confine it to a small group of people. More and more attention is paid to the conduct of particular individuals. ... There are no workers here. This is the world of lower and middle-ranking 'chiefs'. Bureaucracy. A milieu in which honesty is impossible, unattainable, having been eradicated. Love for one's job and confidence in one's rightness are also unattainable.... We behold the anatomy of the bureaucratic world, its mechanisms, the Mafia-like bonds among the bureaucratic cliques, the formation of a 'clientage', and all the relationships that result.

=== Political career ===
Elected to the Supreme Soviet of the Union of Soviet Socialist Republics in 1989, Gelman was an outspoken supporter of liberal changes and of general secretary Mikhail Gorbachev's perestroika and glasnost package in the 1980s, but in a 1989 interview with David Remnick of The Washington Post'' characterized the idea of the liberal politician Boris Yeltsin taking the place of Gorbachev was "a bit ridiculous". Supporting Gorbachev's new course against its critics, Gelman opined that "If the processes of democratization are halted, if perestroika is thrown out, a moral death awaits our party, the party of Lenin."

In 1990, Gorbachev personally recommended Gelman to become a member of the Central Committee of the Communist Party of the Soviet Union, but left the party months afterward without stepping down from the Committee, prompting his fellow members to take the step of expelling him from the Central Committee afterward. An October 1991 Washington Times article described him as a "vocal anti-communist".

Gelman was a signer of the 1993 Letter of Forty-Two, an Izvestiya-published open letter containing a collective appeal by forty-two prominent literati calling on Russian president Boris Yeltsin to ban the Communist Party of the Russian Federation and nationalist organizations in the wake of the 1993 Russian constitutional crisis, a political stand-off between the communist- and nationalist-dominated legislature and the Russian president.

Since 2001 he is a member of public council of the Russian Jewish Congress.

On 25 October 2008, he received a birthday greeting from Russian president Dmitry Medvedev.

In May 2018, Gelman joined the statement of Russian writers in defense of the Ukrainian director Oleg Sentsov, convicted in Russia.

== List of literary works ==
- Что сначала, что потом // ЛГ. – 1986. – 10 Sep
- Перестройка: обратные связи // ИК. – 1987. – No. 9
- Время собирания сил // Сов. культура. – 1988. – 9 Apr
- Вопросы и мысли // ИК. – 1988. – No. 9
- У нас в запасе нет вечности // ИК. – 1989. – No. 1
- Как быть с консерваторами? // ИК. – 1989. – No. 4
- Не выверни свободу наизнанку // ИК. – 1989. – No. 7
- После съезда – перед съездом // ИК. – 1989. – No. 8
- Кино и будущее // СФ. – 1989. – No. 8
- Демократия – это человечность // Сов. культура. – 1989. – 4 Nov
- Принципы и компромиссы // ИК. – 1989. – No. 11
- Грех упрощенчества // ИК. – 1990. – No. 1
- Третий фронт // ИК. – 1990. – No. 4
- Другие – это мы // ИК. – 1990. – No. 5
- Тоска... // ИК. – 1990. – No. 11
- Игра в бессмертие // ИК. – 1991. – No. 1
- Они должны знать // ИК. – 1991. – No. 3
- Нельзя без зимы // ИК. – 1991. – No. 4
- Дожить бы до смерти // ИК. – 1991. – No. 5
- Откровенно говоря // ИК. – 1991. – No. 7
- Сверху вниз, снизу вверх // ИК. – 1991. – No. 10
- Август // ИК. – 1991. – No. 11
- Народ, начальство и мы // ИК. – 1992. – No. 1
- Если выставить в музее шестидесятника // ИК. – 1992. – No. 4
- Новые чувства, истины старые // ИК. – 1992. – No. 5
- Жажда врага // ИК. – 1992. – No. 9
- На зимнюю трезвую голову // ИК. – 1992. – No. 12
- Демократия и мы // ЭиС. – 1993. – 28 окт. – 4 ноября
- Апостол Павел и мы // МН. – 1994. – 23 – 30 окт.
- Две с половиной культуры // ТЖ. – 1995. – No. 10
- Не свободой единой // МН. – 1997. – 23 – 30 марта
- Моя революция // МН. – 1997. – 2 – 9 ноября
- Итоги без дороги // ЛГ. – 1999. – 21 окт

== Filmography ==
- 1970 Ночная смена
- 1974 Ксения, любимая жена Федора
- 1974 Премия
- 1977 Обратная связь
- 1979 Неудобный человек (СССР) screenplay co-authored with Movchan
- 1980 Мы, нижеподписавшиеся
- 1986 Зина-зинуля
- 1990 Мы странно встретились
- 2001 Горбачев. После империи.
- 2004 Arie (Россия/Израиль/Литва), screenplay co-authored with Roman Kachanov

== Bibliography ==
- Бауман Е. Тугой узел // СЭ. – 1986. – No. 24. (о ф. "Зина-Зинуля", also about A.G)
- Левитин М. Зина-Зинуля // СФ. – 1987. – No. 2. (also about A.G)
- Марголит Е. А вот она, музыка... // ИК. – 1987. – No. 3. (о ф. Зина-Зинуля, also about A.G)
- Симанович Г. Диалектика свободы. Инт. с А. Г. // Сов. культура. – 1989. – 22 апр.
- Аннинский Л. Дважды два – четыре? / В кн.: Билет в рай. – М.: Искусство, 1989. (also about A.G)
- Ефремов О. Драматургия А. Гельмана на сцене театра / В кн.: Все непросто. – М.: АРТ, 1992
- Швыдкой М. Сашин юбилей // НГ. – 1993. – 26 окт.
- Гранин Д. Три юбиляра в одном лице// ОГ. – 1993. – 29 окт. (also about A.G)
- Цекиновский Б. Возвращение// ТЖ. – 1995. – No. 3
- Шевелев В. Старость – это молодость мудрости // МН. – 1998. – 18 окт.
- Шаповал С. За скуку! Инт. с А. Г. // НГ. – 1999. – 17 апр
