= Sandra Sade =

Israeli actress

- סנדרה שדה
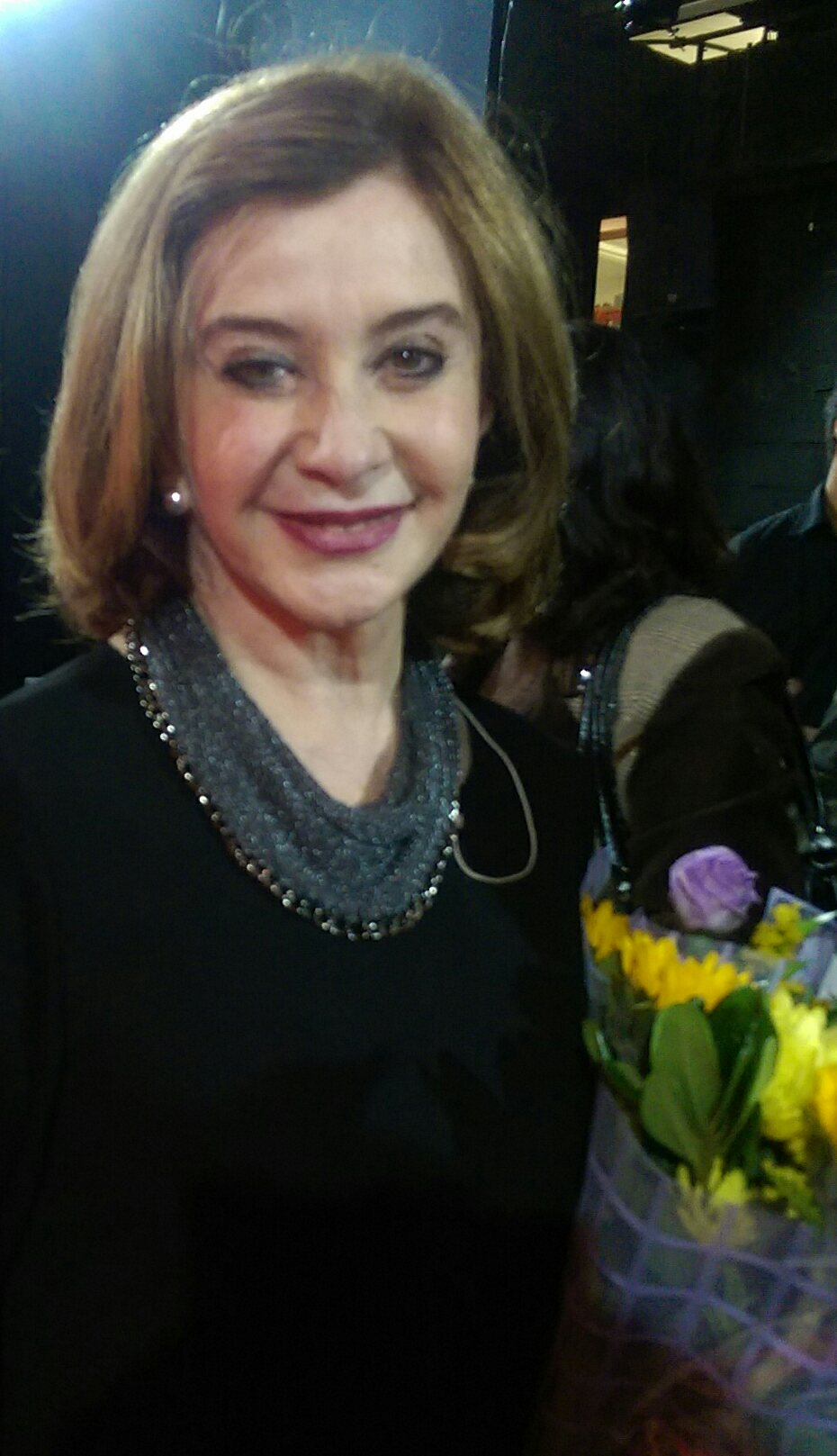
- Sandra Sade, 2017
- Born: October 28, 1949 (age 76); Miercurea Ciuc, Romania
- Spouse: Moni Moshonov
- Children: 2, including Michael Moshonov

Sandra Sade-Moshonov (Hebrew: סנדרה שדה) is an Israeli film, television and theater actress.

== Biography ==
Sandra Sade was born in Romania.

== Acting and film career ==
Sade performed for about 17 years at the Cameri Theater. She also played at the Beit Lessin Theater.

In 1981, Sade participated in the educational television program, Homeland. She also participated in the drama, Poker Face, from the Homeland Lesson series, and had a guest role in the comedy series, Krovim Krovim.

Sade has appeared in several films. In 1988, she had a secondary role (Alice Alexandrovich) in Eli Cohen 's film based on a script by Gila Almagor, Aviya's Summer. In 2001, she appeared in Six Million Shreds; in 2004, she starred in Arie by Roman Kachanov, as well as in The Secret of Chocolate, alongside Hanan Goldblatt; and in 2006, she played Hannah alongside Yisrael Poliakov in Daniel Syrkin's film, Apparently. In 2007, she appeared in the movie, מתוק ומר, in the role of a fortune teller.

In 2010, she participated in the TV series, Arab Labor, playing the role of Yocheved. Starting in 2011, she played Rivka (Ricky) Rosen in the comedy series, Savri Maranan. In both series she embodied a stereotypical Polish mother.

In 2012, she guest-starred in the series, Rest, and in 2014, she appeared in the series, Yellow Peppers. From that year, she performed in the Cameri Theater in the play, The New Criminals, by Edna Mazya. From 2016, she played (alternately with Hanna Laslow) the role of Bertha in Fleischer, a play by Yigal Even Or in the stage theater. That year she translated the play, Shirley Valentine, by Willie Russell for Theater Show.

In 2017, she appeared in the film, The Cakemaker. Also in 2017, she commenced a role as the older Naomi Shemer (alternately with Gila Almagor) in the musical, Biography of Naomi Shemer. In 2019, she began acting in the musical, Givat Halfon Doesn't Answer, at the Habima Theater. Beginning in August 2019, she played alongside Yona Elian in Things I Know at the Beit Lessin Theater in collaboration with Haifa Theatre.

In 2021, she took part in the second season of the Israeli production of The Masked Singer with the stage name Strawberry, and was the fourth contestant eliminated.

== Filmography ==
- The Singer in the Mask
- The Cakemaker (2017)
- Yellow Peppers (2014)
- Maasiya Urbanit (2012)
- Tanuhi (2012)
- Savri Maranan (2011) Rivka «Riki» Rosen
- Arab Labor (2007) Yocheved
- Lemarit Ain (2006) Hana
- Things Behind the Sun (2006) Smadi
- Yamim Kfuim (2005) Neighbor
- Poker Face (2002) Anna
- Shisha Million Resisim (2001)
- Etz Hadomim Tafus (1994) Aunt Alice, voice acting
- Aviya's Summer (1988) Aunt Alice
- Krovim Krovim (1982) Bruria
- Cyrilson Retires

== Personal life ==
Sade has been married since 1977 to actor Moni Moshonov, and is the mother of opera singer Alma Moshonov and actor and musician Michael Moshonov.

She resides in Tel Aviv.

== See also ==
- Theater of Israel
- Women in Israel
