= Exporting Raymond =

- Directed by: Philip Rosenthal
- Written by: Philip Rosenthal
- Screenplay by: Philip Rosenthal
- Produced by: Jim Czarnecki; Philip Rosenthal; Brian Singbiel (co-producer)
- Starring: Stanislav Duzhnikov; Anna Frolovtseva; Philip Rosenthal
- Narrated by: Philip Rosenthal
- Cinematography: Geoffrey O'Connor
- Edited by: Brian Singbiel
- Music by: Rick Marotta
- Production company: Culver Entertainment
- Distributed by: Samuel Goldwyn Films
- Release date: October 21, 2010 (USA)
- Running time: 86 minutes
- Countries: United States; Russia
- Languages: English; Russian
- Box office: $87,727

Exporting Raymond is a 2010 comedy documentary film directed, written, produced and acted by showrunner Philip Rosenthal.

== Summary ==
The documentary follows Rosenthal, the creator of Everybody Loves Raymond, on a journey to create a Russian version of the hit TV series under the name Voronin's Family.

== Cast ==
- Stanislav Duzhnikov – actor (Lyonya Voronin)
- Anna Frolovtseva – actress (Galina Voronina)
- Boris Klyuyev – actor (Nikolai Voronin)
- Konstantin Naumochkin – executive producer
- Oleg Tabakov – Russian actor
- Georgy Dronov – actor (Kostya Voronin)
- Ray Romano – actor (cameo)
- Eldar – Phil Rosenthal's driver in Russia
- Shablan Muslimov – man with TV set

== Reception ==
On Rotten Tomatoes, it holds a 72% with an average rating of 6.2 out of 10, based on 25 reviews. Metacritic gave a score of 55 out of 100, receiving mixed reviews based on 13 critics.
