= Yekaterina Volkova =

Yekaterina Volkova may refer to:

- Yekaterina Volkova (actress) (born 1982), Russian actress
- Yekaterina Volkova (runner) (born 1978), Russian long-distance runner
- Ekaterina Volkova (rhythmic gymnast) (born 1997), Finnish rhythmic gymnast
- Yekaterina Volkova (actress and singer) (born 1974), Russian actress
