= Summer Time: Travel Back =

- Film poster
- Directed by: Karen Zaharov; Armen Ananikyan
- Written by: Armen Ananikyan; Aleksandr Nazarov; Oleg Smagin; Aleksandr Shamparov; Anton Nikolaenko
- Produced by: Mikhail Galustyan; Armen Ananikyan; Konstantin Elkin; Oleg Smagin; Aleksandr Nazarov
- Starring: Daniil Bolshov; Aleksey Onezhen; Elizaveta Anokhina; Daniil Muravyov-Izotov
- Cinematography: Kirill Zotkin
- Edited by: Dmitry Slobtsov; Andrey Shatskikh; Georgy Isahakyan; Olga Proshkina
- Music by: Igor Babaev
- Production companies: Fresh Film; Big Cinema House
- Distributed by: Nashe Kino (Our Cinema)
- Release date: April 28, 2022
- Running time: 105 minutes
- Country: Russia
- Language: Russian
- Budget: ₽125 million

Summer Time: Travel Back (Russian: Артек. Большое путешествие, romanized: Artek: Bolshoe puteshestvie) is a 2022 Russian children's fantasy comedy film directed by Karen Zaharov and Armen Ananikyan.

It was theatrically released on April 28, 2022.

== Plot ==
Four friends, while in the Artek camp, made wishes at the magic tree, as a result of which they ended up in the Crimean Peninsula, the Soviet Union in 1988 and met their parents. To get back, they will have to establish contact with their parents, as quarrels await them in the future.

== Cast ==
- Daniil Bolshov as Roma Kovalev (English: Romka)
- Aleksey Onezhen as Yarik Lebedev
- Liza Anokhina as Nikoletta Osipova
- Daniil Muravyov-Izotov as Elisey Osipov (English: Yelisey)
- Mikhail Galustyan as Sergey Kurochkin in 1988
- Ekaterina Klimova as Roma's mother
- Sergey Bezrukov as Yura Kovalev, Roma's father
  - Vladislav Semiletkov as Yura Kovalev as a child in 1988
- Yevgeny Pronin as Igor Lebedev, Yarik's father
  - Denis Kucher as Igor Lebedev as a child in 1988
- Yan Tsapnik as Yaroslav Lebedev in 1988, Yarik's grandfather
- Nadezhda Mikhalkova as Ira Osipova, Nikoletta and Elisey's mother
  - Marta Timofeeva as Ira Osipova as a child in 1988
- Stanislav Duzhnikov as Vasya Osipov, Nikoletta and Elisey's father
  - Yan Alabushev as Vasya Osipov as a child in 1988
- Lyudmila Artemyeva as Olga in 1988
- Elizaveta Moryak as Elizaveta in 1988 (English: Yelizaveta)

=== Cameos ===
- Sergey Zhukov
  - Endzhel Zhukov as Sergey Zhukov as a child in 1988
- Nika Zhukova as a member of a musical group

== Production ==
Principal photography started in early May 2019 at the Artek camp in Crimea, which has been annexed to Russia in 2014 but is internationally recognized as Ukrainian territory. In early June, Sergey Zhukov (musician), the soloist of the group “Hands Up!”, alongside his children Nika and Endzhel, joined the film crew as actors.
