= Artur Solomonov =

- Артур Соломонов
- Born: 10 April 1976 (age 50); Khabarovsk, RSFSR, USSR
- Citizenship: Soviet Union; Russian
- Education: GITIS
- Occupations: writer, playwright, journalist, and theatre critic

Artur Solomonov is a writer, playwright, journalist, and theatre critic.

He was born in Khabarovsk in 1976 into a family of university professors.

In 1993, he moved to Moscow and enrolled in the Theatre Studies Department at GITIS, the Russian Institute of Theatre Arts.

After graduating, he wrote for the newspapers Izvestia and Novaya Gazeta, headed the culture section of The New Times magazine, and worked for the Kultura television channel. He has written more than a thousand articles on theatre, as well as reviews and interviews with leading Russian and European cultural figures.

In 2010, he left journalism and moved to India, where he started writing his first novel.

In 2013, Alpina Non-Fiction published his novel A Theatrical Story. The book remained on Russian contemporary-fiction bestseller lists for several months and has since gone through six editions — the first five in Russia (2013, 2014, 2016, 2018, and 2021), and the sixth in Israel in 2026. The novel includes forewords by Lyudmila Ulitskaya and Liya Akhedzhakova.

More than a hundred reviews, interviews, and articles about the novel have appeared in Russia and abroad, in publications such as Forbes, Snob, and The New Times. A review also appeared in the German newspaper Die Tageszeitung.

At the invitation of local organisers, Artur Solomonov has presented the novel in New York, San Francisco, Zurich, Vienna, Lviv, and other cities.

In the summer of 2015, a successful stage adaptation of the novel premiered in Moscow.

In 2016, his play Grace won the award for Best Play on a Social and Political Theme at the 8th Biennale of Contemporary Drama, a competition that drew more than 500 plays from 14 countries. Sir Tom Stoppard chaired the Biennale's board of trustees.

The play was staged in Moscow, St Petersburg, and Tatarstan, and was published in the literary magazine LiTerra.

In 2019, Artur Solomonov wrote the tragic farce How We Buried Josef Stalin. That same year, Snob published the play, and it was presented as a staged reading at Moscow's independent Teatr.doc, featuring well-known Russian actors.

In 2020, during the COVID-19 pandemic, the American theatre company Ross Valley Players, based in California, presented the online premiere of the English-language version of How We Buried Josef Stalin.

How We Buried Josef Stalin had its Russian stage premiere in Chelyabinsk in 2021. The production prompted a large campaign demanding it be banned, including solo pickets, demonstrations, and appeals to the Russian Presidential Administration and the Federal Security Service (FSB).

In January 2022, a trilingual edition of the play — in German, English, and Russian — was published in Austria.

The play has since been translated into eleven languages. A standalone book edition was published in the Netherlands; the full English translation appeared in the American journal The Mercurian; the complete play was published in the Polish theatre journal Dialog; and excerpts from the English translation appeared in the international literary magazine Asymptote.

Since 2019, How We Buried Josef Stalin has had dozens of productions and staged readings across Europe, Israel, and the United States.

The play has received extensive coverage in leading European media. The respected Swiss newspaper Neue Zürcher Zeitung ran a major feature on it. Germany's national radio broadcaster Deutschlandfunk opened one of its news programmes with a report on the play and an interview with the author. It was also featured on ARD's Weltspiegel.
