= Aleksei Panin =

Russian actor (born 1977)

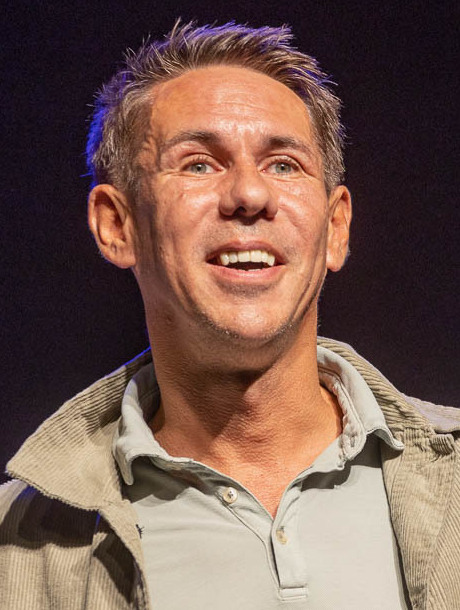
- Panin in 2023
- Born: 10 September 1977 (age 48); Moscow, Russian SFSR, Soviet Union
- Occupation: Actor
- Years active: 1999–present
- Children: 3

Aleksei Vyacheslavovich Panin (Russian: Алексей Вячеславович Панин; born 10 September 1977) is a Russian actor and laureate of the State Prize of the Russian Federation (2003). He attended Russian Academy of Theatre Arts.

== Personal life ==
Panin left Russia in 2020 and moved to Torrevieja. He is currently a stern critic of the Russian government and the Ukraine invasion, so on 22 May 2023, the Russian Ministry of the Interior issued an arrest warrant against Panin for having celebrated the Crimean Bridge explosion on social media.

He has three children.

== Selected filmography ==
- Demobbed (2000)
- The Romanovs: An Imperial Family (2000)
- In August of 1944 (2001)
- Down House (2001)
- The Star (2002)
- Dead Man's Bluff (2005)
- Rzhevsky versus Napoleon (2008)
- The Best Movie 2 (2009)
- O Lucky Man! (2009)
- Spy (2012)

== Awards ==
- State Prize of the Russian Federation (2002)

== Controversies ==
In June 2013, police opened a criminal case against Panin for "intentional destruction of other people's property" due to the debauchery that he initiated in a bar in Tuapse. The same year in August, Ukrainian police opened a criminal case against Panin for "Intentional infliction of minor bodily injury". The media reported that he had a car accident in Crimea. Shortly after the accident, he made a series of insulting statements about Ukraine and the Crimean Tatars and hit a local resident. Later, Panin apologized for his behaviour to the Crimean Tatars.
