= Vsevolod Larionov =

Soviet and Russian actor (1928–2000)

Vsevolod Dmitriyevich Larionov (Russian: Всеволод Дмитриевич Ларионов; September 11, 1928 – October 8, 2000) was a Soviet and Russian stage and film actor. People's Artist of the RSFSR (1978).

== Selected filmography ==
- Fifteen-Year-Old Captain (1945) as Master Dick Sand
- Cruiser 'Varyag' (1946) as Dorofeyev
- Springtime (1947) as Gaffer (uncredited)
- Przhevalsky (1952) as Roborovsky
- Silvery Dust (1953) as Harry Steal
- The Poet (1957) as Sergei Orlovsky, anti-communist
- Street Full of Surprises (1958) as Vladimir Zvantsev
- The Twelve Chairs (1976, TV Mini-Series)
- 38 Parrots (1976–1991, TV Series) as Parrot (voice)
- An Ordinary Miracle (1979, TV Movie) as hunter
- Siberiade (1979) as Fyodor Nikolaevich
- The Very Same Munchhausen (1979, TV Movie) as Judge
- Ogaryova Street, Number 6 (1981) as Proskuryakov
- The Mystery of the Third Planet (1981) as Seleznyov (voice)
- Dog in Boots (1981, Short) as Buckingham's Watch Dog (voice)
- Family Relations (1982) as general
- The House That Swift Built (1982, TV Movie) as Bigs, judge
- Anna Pavlova (1983, TV Series) as Sergei Diaghilev
- Demidovs (1984) as Ushakov
- Alone and Unarmed (1984) as Ivan Ivanovich Melentyev
- Peter the Great (1986, TV Mini-Series) as Prince Sukhorukov
- Dark Eyes (1987) as Pavel (Russian Ship Passenger)
- Prisoners of Yamagiri-Maru (1988, Short) as Aran Singh
- Intergirl (1989) as narrator (voice)
- Vaniusha The Newcomer (1990) as narrator (voice)
- Stalin's Funeral (1990) as Narrator (voice)
- Vaniusha and The Space Pirate (1991, Short) as narrator (voice)
- Crazies (1991) as Rozanov-Razdorskiy
- Stalin (1992, TV Movie) as Dr. Lukomsky
- Vaniusha and The Giant (1993, Short) as narrator (voice)
- Glasha and Kikimora (1992, TV Short) as The Black Cat (voice)
- The Russian Singer (1993) as Colonel Gavrilin
- The Master and Margarita (1994) as episode
- Queen Margot (1996, TV Series) as Gaspard II de Coligny
- Repete (2000) as Khrunov (final film role)
