= Vladimir Danilevich =

Vladimir Danilevich Владимир Данилевич
- Born: Vladimir Petrovich Danilevich; 4 September 1924; Moscow, USSR
- Died: 9 October 2001 (aged 77); Moscow, Russia
- Occupations: film director, screenwriter, art director, animator

Vladimir Petrovich Danilevich (Russian: Владимир Петрович Данилевич; 4 September 1924 – 9 October 2001) was a well-known Soviet and Russian animator who successfully worked as a film director, screenwriter and art director.

== Selected filmography ==
=== Director ===
- 1976—"How an Old Man destroyed The Great Balance"
- 1989—"The Newcomer in The Cabbage"
- 1990—"Vaniusha The Newcomer"
- 1991—"Vaniusha and The Space Pirate"
- 1993—"Vaniusha and The Giant"
- 1993—"An Autumn Meeting"
- 1993—"Caveman and Friends: Surprise Caveman"

=== Screenwriter ===
- 1993—"An Autumn Meeting"

=== Art Director ===
- 1956—"A Wonderfull Well"
- 1958—"Beloved Beauty"
- 1959—"The Soldier has returned home"

=== Animator ===
- 1949—"Geese-Swans"
- 1949—"Mister Wolf"
- 1952—"The Snow Maiden"
- 1956—"A Wonderfull Well"

=== Second Director (First Assistant) ===
- 1964—Lefty
- 1966—Go There, Don't Know Where

(Full Filmography of Vladimir Danilevich)
