= Glasha and Kikimora =

Glasha and Kikimora Глаша и Кикимора
- Directed by: Alexander Mazaev
- Written by: Roman Kachanov, Jr (credit as R.Gubin), Alexander Guriev, Alexander Mazaev
- Starring: Youry Volyntsev, Lyudmila Gnilova, Liya Akhedzhakova, Svetlana Kharlap, Vsevolod Larionov
- Cinematography: Kabul Rasulov
- Edited by: G. Smirnova
- Music by: Nina Savicheva
- Release date: 1992
- Running time: 10 minutes
- Country: Russia
- Language: Russian

Glasha and Kikimora (Russian: Глаша и Кикимора) is a 1992 Russian Animation film by Alexander Mazaev. This cartoon was produced by Soyuzmultfilm studio.
"Glasha and Kikimora" is The Fairy Tale cartoon.

== Plot ==
The Plot of The Film based on The Original Fairy Tale including The Heroes of The Folk Tales.
It is a magic story how Glasha has rescued her younger little sister from malicious Kikimora. Glasha's Adventures happen in the night forest. Glasha also helps her Black cat. When the sun rises, evil sorcery dissipated. Glasha decides, that it was her dream.

== Creators ==
	English	Russian
Director	Alexander Mazaev	Александр Мазаев
Writers	Roman Kachanov, Jr (credit as R.Gubin), Alexander Guriev, Alexander Mazaev	Роман Качанов (псевдоним Р.Губин), Александр Гурьев, Александр Мазаев
Art Director	Tatiana Ilyina	Татьяна Ильина
Animators	V. Kayukov, Vladimir Zakharov, Galina Zebrova, Alexander Panov, Andrey Smirnov, Yuriy Meshcheryakov, Alexander Mazaev, Joseph Kuroyan	Вячеслав Каюков, Владимир Захаров, Галина Зеброва, Александр Панов, Андрей Смирнов, Юрий Мещеряков, Александр Мазаев, Иосиф Куроян,
Artists	Victoria Makina, Irina Sobyanina, Yu. Cherkassova, Z. Monetova, Sergei Marakasov	Виктория Макина, Ирина Собянина, Ю. Черкасова, Зоя Монетова, Сергей Маракасов
Camera	Kabul Rasulov	Кабул Расулов
Music	Filipp Koltsov, Nina Savicheva	Филипп Кольцов, Нина Савичева
Sound	Vladimir Kutuzov	Владимир Кутузов
Executive Producers	Nina Suchkova, Bella Khodova	Нина Сучкова, Белла Ходова
Voice Actors	Yuri Volyntsev, Lyudmila Gnilova, Liya Akhedzhakova, Svetlana Kharlap, Vsevolod Larionov	Юрий Волынцев, Людмила Гнилова, Лия Ахеджакова, Светлана Харлап, Всеволод Ларионов,
Editor	G. Smirnova	Г. Смирнова
Script Editor	Elena Nikitkina	Елена Никиткина
Assistantes	A. Radkovskaya, I. Mazayeva, T. Kolossova	А. Радковская, И. Мазаева, Татьяна Колосова,
