= Andrey Orlov =

Russian poet, journalist, and scriptwriter

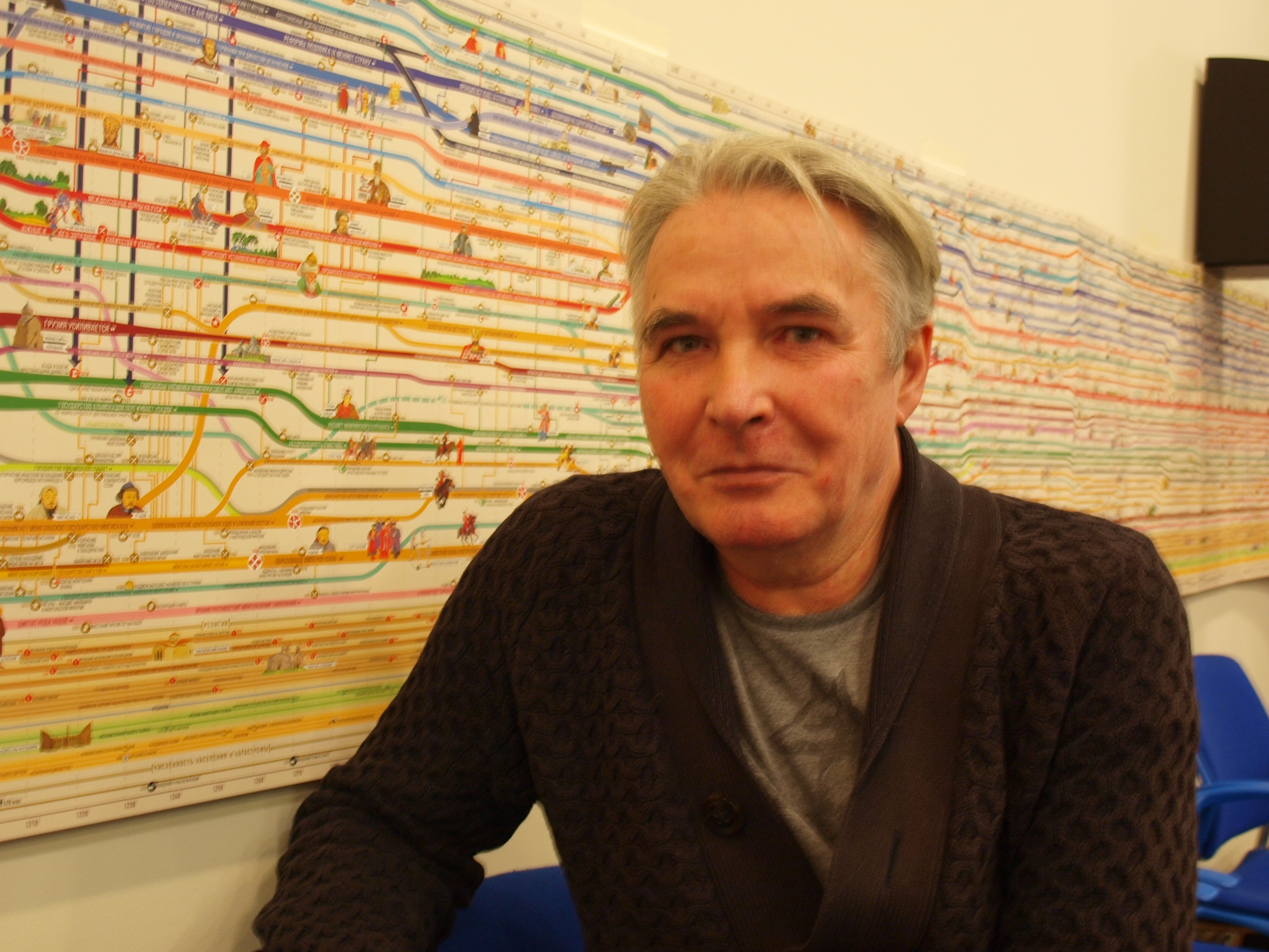
- Born: November 2, 1957 (age 68); Berezniki, Soviet Union

Andrey Orlov, known as Orlusha (November 2, 1957) is a Russian poet, journalist and scriptwriter.

== Political views ==
During Russo-Georgian War in 2008 he wore T-shirt saying "I am Georgian" and wrote poems satirizing Russian leadership because of its policy towards Georgia.

In 2013, when Russian gay propaganda law was passed and before 2014 Winter Olympics in Sochi, when the authorities began to kill stray dogs, he wore a T-shirt saying "I am a stray dog and a homosexual, kill me!"

After the Malaysia Airlines Flight 17 with almost 300 people on board was shot down by Russian-controlled forces on 17 July 2014, the Russian actress Liya Akhedzhakova publicly read Orlov's poem Requiem for MH-17 (Реквием по MH-17).

In 2015 he stressed it was important not to forget about political prisoners, citing the names of Ukrainian pilot Nadiya Savchenko and filmmaker Oleh Sentsov. In autumn of 2018 he wrote a poem "Wind over Labytnangi" to support Sentsov who was jailed there.

== See also ==
- List of Heroes of the Russian Federation
