= The 13th Apostle =

- Directed by: Suren Babayan
- Written by: Suren Babayan; Georgiy Nikolayev
- Starring: Juozas Budraitis; Andrei Boltnev; Vladas Bagdonas; Armen Dzhigarkhanyan; Donatas Banionis
- Cinematography: Artyom Melkumyan
- Edited by: L. Eryomenko
- Music by: Edouard Ayrapetyan
- Production company: Armenfilm
- Release date: 3 June 1988
- Running time: 105 minutes
- Country: Soviet Union
- Language: Russian

The 13th Apostle (Russian: 13-й апостол, romanized: Trinadtsatyy apostol) is a 1988 Soviet science fiction film directed by Suren Babayan, loosely based on the 1950 book The Martian Chronicles by Ray Bradbury.

== Plot ==
The crew of а space expedition dies under mysterious circumstances. After 15 years, an inspector investigates why the exploration of a planet was abandoned. To do this, he visits the only surviving member of the crew, Captain Amos, who now lives in a shelter for retired astronauts. In the report, he made a ban on further exploration of this planet.

It turns out that the inhabitants of the planet took on the appearance of the crew members' deceased relatives to inspire the idea that a quarantine regime is needed in this place. Moreover, the captain returns accompanied by a certain being (the "apostle"), who possesses Absalom.

== Cast ==
- Juozas Budraitis — Captain Amos
- Andrei Boltnev — Inspector
- Vladas Bagdonas — Apostle / Absalom
- Armen Dzhigarkhanyan — David, director of the shelter
- Donatas Banionis — father
- Algis Matulionis — priest
- Valentinas Masalskis - member of the expedition
- Juris Riiinieks — member of the expedition
- Mikk Mikiver — member of the expedition (in credits Mick Mikiver)
- Karen Dzhanibekyan — member of the expedition
- Vladimir Kocharyan
- Levon Nersesyan
- Ingeborga Dapkūnaitė — Maria
- Elle Kull — Elma, nurse in the shelter
- Irena Kuksenate
- Neole Geljinite
- Irena Cresuote
- Ilona Balsite
- Joseph Nalbandian
- Georgiy Sichkar
- Mikael Dovlatyan
