= Liza Anokhina =

Russian blogger and TikToker (born 2007)

- Елизавета Вадимовна Анохина
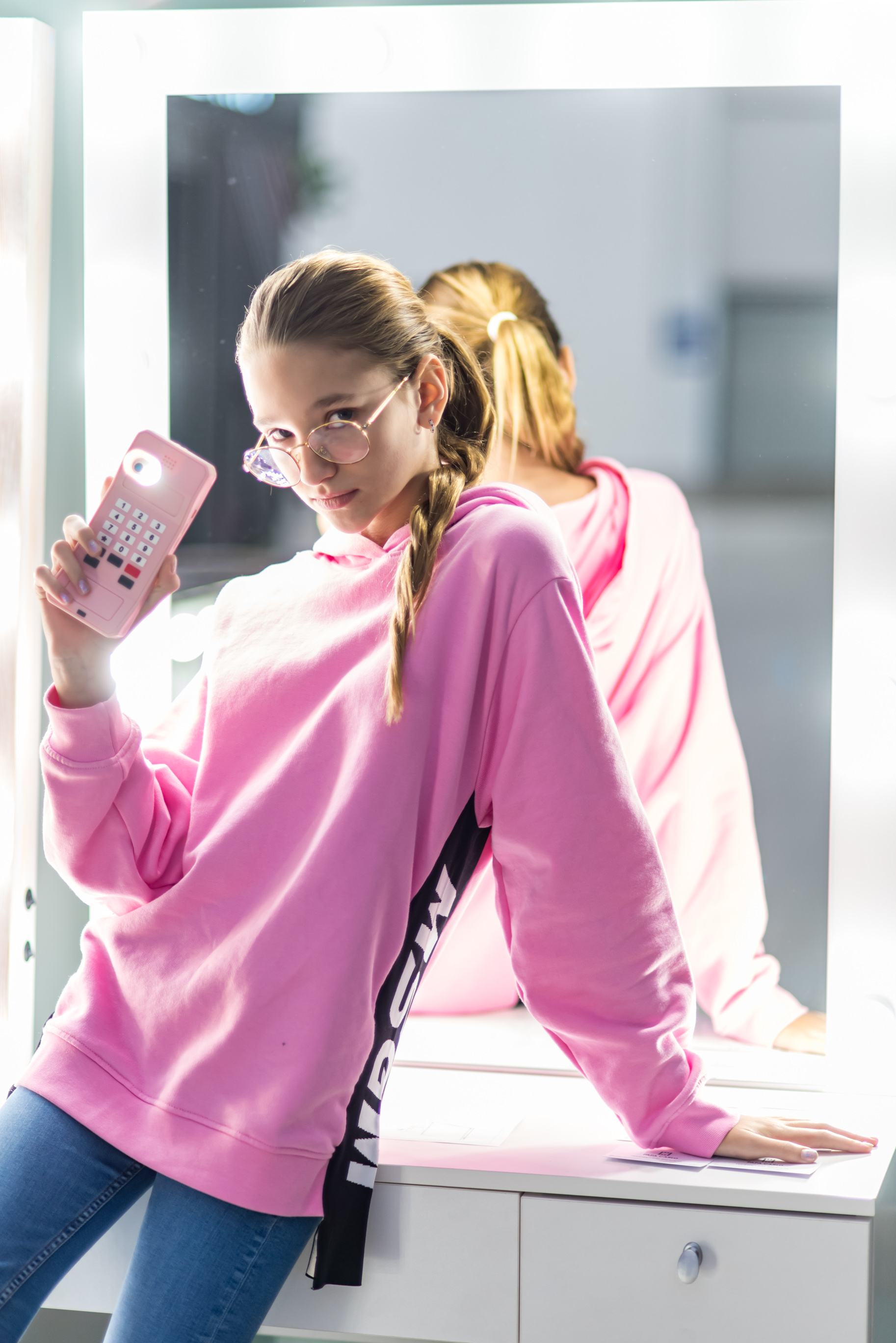
- Anokhina in 2019
- Born: Elizaveta Anokhina; April 30, 2007 (age 19); Moscow, Russia
- Other name: Vika Amoraeva
- Parents: Vadim Anokhin (father); Marina Anokhina (mother)
- Family: 2 sisters, 1 brother

TikTok information
- Page: Anokhina Liza
- Years active: 2020–present
- Followers: 40.1M
- Last updated: April 2025

Elizaveta "Liza" Vadimovna Anokhina (Russian: Елизавета Вадимовна Анохина; born April 30, 2007) is a Russian blogger and TikToker.

== Creativity and career ==
Anokhina began her career as a singer and TV presenter in 2016.

In November 2016, she sang the song "The Impossible is Possible" in a duet with Dima Bilan at the artist's concert at Crocus City Hall.

In January 2017, she sang the song "Zvezda" with Bilan again for the Nutcracker ice show. For this duet, she was awarded the "Girl of the Year" award in the "Duo of the Year" nomination at the 2017 Teens Awards from Igor Krutoy's Academy of Popular Music. In 2017, Anokhina became a member of the Fairy Patrol group. At the Kinder Music Awards 2017 ceremony, she acted as a presenter, won the nomination "Best Young TV Presenter of the Year"., presented a duet with Philip Kirkorov for the song "Electric Kiss" Together with Andrey Malakhov and Nikolai Baskov, she presented the award to Olga Buzova and together with her performed the song "Hit Parade".

From May 2017 to May 2018, Anokhina was the host of the Children's Morning Mail program on the Carousel channel and was also one of the hosts of the Children's Ten program on Muz-TV. Participated as a model at the Russian Fashion Week show.

Since March 2018, Anokhina has been acting as a co-host of Olga Buzova in the program "Top Chart 18" on the channel RU.TV.

On April 30, 2018, the premiere of the music video "Boom" took place. The song has gained more than 2 million views. In June 2018, she performed it at the "Heat in Vegas" concert. In the same year, Anokhina starred in the television series Veil and Random Bride, and took part in the filming of the project "Red Prophecies". She was noted for a cameo role in Timur Bekmambetov's film Yolki 7.

In 2019, she played one of the main roles in the film Summer Time: Travel Back. On June 28, she released the song and video "Well, this". In October, she performed at the pitching session "Self-producer!" within the framework of the St. Petersburg International Cultural Forum.

In 2019, she headed the direction of teen vines and received the titles of "Weiner of the Year" and "Girl of the Year" at the "Bachelorette Teens Awards 2019" ceremony.

In April 2019, Anokhina released a solo song "Here and There" . In May, she became the main character in the program "I love you", dedicated to child bloggers, on the channel "Spas". At the beginning of the summer of 2019, she took part in Igor Rybakov's social project "Thank you for love".

She released a video for the song "Open Your Eyes", where she urged people to be kinder to each other. One of the supporters of Anokhina was Olga Buzova.

In February 2020, she became one of the heroines of the issue "Millionaire Children. Dok-tok" on the First channel.

In April 2026, she decided to launch an OnlyFans account. Liza quickly became placed in top 300 models on the platform.

== Filmography ==
Year	Title	Role
2017	Veil	Dasha
2018	Random bride	Liza Knyazeva
2018	Yolki 7	Natasha Kotova
2019	Dam	Liza
2021	Red Prophecies	Katya
2022	Summer Time: Travel Back	Nikoletta Osipova
2023	Lie if You Can	Herself (host)
TBA	Martha and the Bird	

== Discography ==
=== Singles ===
Year	Name	Notes
2018	"Открой глаза"	digital single
2018	"Boom"	digital single
2019	"Тут и там"	digital single
2019	"МЕЛОМ (2021 Remasterizado)"	digital single
2019	"Ну такое"	digital single
2019	"Игра"	digital single
2026	"i'm not a person"	digital single

== Awards ==
Year	Prize	Category	Result
2017	Bachelorette Party Teens Awards 2017	Duet of the Year	Won
2017	Kinder MUZ Awards 2017	Best Young TV Presenter of the Year	Won
2017	Kinder MUZ Awards 2017	Best song of the year in Russian	Nominated
2017	Kinder MUZ Awards 2017	Best Duet of the Year	Nominated
2018	Bachelorette Party Teens Awards 2018	TV presenter of the year	Won
2019	Bachelorette Party Teens Awards 2019	Weiner of the Year	Won
2019	Bachelorette Party Teens Awards 2019	Girl of the Year	Won
