= Down House (film) =

2001 film by Roman Kachanov

- Film poster
- Russian: Даун Хаус
- Directed by: Roman Kachanov
- Written by: Roman Kachanov; Ivan Okhlobystin
- Starring: Fyodor Bondarchuk; Juozas Budraitis; Ivan Okhlobystin; Stanislav Duzhnikov; Aleksei Panin; Mikhail Petrovsky; Mikhail Vladimirov; Jerzy Stuhr; Barbara Brylska; Artemy Troitsky; Elena Kondulainen; Aleksandr Bashirov; Olga Budina
- Release date: 18 May 2001
- Running time: 89 minutes
- Country: Russia
- Language: Russian

Down House (Russian: Даун Хаус, romanized: Daun khaus) is a 2001 Russian comedy-gross-out film by Roman Kachanov, a modern interpretation of the 1869 novel The Idiot by Fyodor Dostoevsky.

The film received the Special Jury Prize at Kinotavr.

== Premise ==
The plot is set in modern Moscow, probably in the second half of the 1990s, with "New Russians", Hummer H1 jeeps, bribery, violence, truckfuls of tinned stew as a dowry, and so on. The film is quite far from the novel's subject, but still keeps to the main storyline. It features Fyodor Bondarchuk as Myshkin, and a soundtrack by DJ Groove, one of the most popular Russian DJs (who appears in the film as a taxi driver).

In Russian, Даун (Down) primarily refers to a person with Down syndrome; while Хаус (House) refers to House music, which is used extensively in the film. The name is also a reference to the tendency of Russian subcultures such as businessmen, hackers and hippies to make heavy use of words borrowed from English and transliterated into the Russian alphabet.

== Plot ==
Prince Lev Nikolaevich Myshkin returns to Moscow after a prolonged stay in a Swiss psychiatric clinic. On the bus ride home, he meets Parfyon Rogozhin, a wealthy merchant. Seeking support and shelter, Myshkin visits his distant relative, General Lizaveta Prokofyevna Yepanchina, who introduces him to her daughters, Alexandra, Adelaide, and Aglaya.

The plot intensifies around the planned marriage between Nastasya Filippovna and Ganya Ivolgin, the general’s secretary. Nastasya, kept by the wealthy and debauched Totsky who seduced her in her youth, believes herself to be “fallen.” Desperate to escape his circumstances, Ganya plans to “marry money” by gaining Totsky’s financial payout.

Prince Myshkin is deeply intrigued by Nastasya, whose allure drives everyone around her to near madness. Myshkin, too, falls for her, while Aglaya Yepanchina decides she loves him and is willing to compete for his affection. Myshkin becomes a catalyst for the best qualities in others, though he is ultimately unable to effect lasting change.

The story ends tragically: Nastasya Filippovna is murdered by the jealous Rogozhin, and Myshkin, devastated, succumbs once more to madness. Set in a futuristic Moscow with towering skyscrapers and advanced technology, the film retains the novel’s storyline while humorously exaggerating the social relations in Moscow society, often blurring social boundaries for added comedic effect.

== Cast ==
- Fyodor Bondarchuk – Prince Myshkin
- Ivan Okhlobystin – Parfyon Rogozhin
- Anna Buklovskaya – Nastasya Filippovna
- Aleksandr Bashirov – Ferdyshchenko
- Mikhail Vladimirov – Ganya Ivolgin
- Jerzy Stuhr – General Ivolgin (voiced by Valentin Smirnitsky)
- Valentina Sharykina – general's wife Ivolgina
- Galina Kashkovskaya – Varya Ivolgina
- Juozas Budraitis – General Epanchin (voiced by Boris Khimichev)
- Barbara Brylska – general's wife Epanchina
- Elena Kotelnikova – Aglaya Epanchina
- Artemy Troitsky – Totsky
