= Vaniusha and The Space Pirate =

Vaniusha and The Space Pirate Ванюша и космический пират
- Directed by: Vladimir Danilevich
- Written by: Roman Kachanov Jr. (credit as R. Gubin)
- Starring: Aleftina Yevdokimova, Svetlana Kharlap, Boris Novikov, V. Bogachev, Alexandra Turgan, Natalia Derzhavina, V. Bogachev
- Narrated by: Vsevolod Larionov
- Cinematography: Vladimir Sidorov
- Edited by: Galina Filatova
- Music by: N. Sokolov
- Release date: 1991
- Running time: 10 min
- Country: Soviet Union
- Language: Russian

Vaniusha and The Space Pirate (Russian: Ванюша и космический пират) is a 1991 Soviet Russian stop-motion animation film by Vladimir Danilevich. This film was produced by Soyuzmultfilm studio.
The film is about The Friendly Newcomer from another planet.
The film is The Third Film of the tetralogy, which tells about the adventures of The Newcomer Vaniusha and his friends. Other three films called The Newcomer in The Cabbage, Vaniusha The Newcomer and Vaniusha and The Giant.

== Plot summary ==
The Alien Prince arrives on Earth, He asks for help Vanyusha. The Space Pirate kidnapped The Alien Princess. Vanyusha with His friends help The Alien Prince and save The Princess.

In The Plot of This Film are mixed The Elements of The Folk Tales and The Science Fiction Stories.

== Creators ==
	English	Russian
Director	Vladimir Danilevich	Владимир Данилевич
Writer	Roman Kachanov Jr. (credit as R. Gubin)	Роман Качанов-младш. (псевдоним Р. Губин)
Art Director	Ekaterina Mikhailova	Екатерина Михайлова
Animators	Sergei Olifirenko, V. Golubev, Vyacheslav Shilobreyev, Olga Panokina	Сергей Олиференко, В. Голубев, Вячеслав Шилобреев, Ольга Панокина
Puppets and decor	Vladimir Alisov, Alexander Belyahev, Vladimir Abbakumov, Vladimir Konobeyev, Natalia Barkovskaya, Nina Moleva, Oleg Massainov, Anna Vetukova, Valery Petrov, Svetlana Znamenskaya, Alexander Maximov, Vladimir Maslov, Youry Aksenov, Nadezhda Lyarskaya, Pavel Gusev	Владимир Алисов, Александр Беляев, Владимир Аббакумов, Владимир Конобеев, Наталия Барковская, Нина Молева, Олег Масаинов, Анна Ветюкова, Валерий Петров, Светлана Знаменская, Александр Максимов, Владимир Маслов, Юрий Аксенов, Надежда Лярская, Павел Гусев
Camera	Vladimir Sidorov	Владимир Сидоров
Music	N. Sokolov	Н. Соколов
Sound	Boris Filchikov	Борис Фильчиков
Executive Producer	V. Lavrik	В. Лаврик
Voice Actors	Aleftina Yevdokimova, Svetlana Kharlap, Boris Novikov, Alexandra Turgan, Natalia Derzhavina, Vsevolod Larionov, V. Bogachev	Алефтина Евдокимова, Светлана Харлап, Борис Новиков, Александра Турган, Наталья Державина, Всеволод Ларионов, В. Богачев
Editor	G. Filatova	Г. Филатова
Script Editor	Natalia Abramova	Наталья Абрамова

== See also ==
- "The Newcomer in The Cabbage"
- "Vaniusha The Newcomer"
- "Vaniusha and The Giant"
