= Vaniusha The Newcomer =

The Newcomer in The Cabbage Пришелец в капусте
- Directed by: Vladimir Danilevich, Olga Panokina
- Written by: Roman Kachanov Jr. (credit as R. Gubin)
- Starring: Aleftina Yevdokimova, Svetlana Kharlap, Boris Novikov, Alexandra Turgan
- Narrated by: Vsevolod Larionov
- Cinematography: Vladimir Sidorov
- Edited by: Galina Filatova
- Music by: N. Sokolov
- Release date: 1990
- Running time: 10 min
- Country: Soviet Union
- Language: Russian

Vaniusha The Newcomer (Russian: Пришелец Ванюша) is a 1990 Soviet Russian stop-motion animation film by Vladimir Danilevich and Olga Panokina. It was produced by Soyuzmultfilm studio.
The film is about The Friendly Newcomer from another planet.
It is the second film of the tetralogy, which tells about the adventures of The Newcomer Vaniusha and his friends. The other three films are The Newcomer in The Cabbage, Vaniusha and The Space Pirate and Vaniusha and The Giant.

== Plot summary ==
The film is set during a cold Russian winter, where Vanyusha and his friends craft a snow sculpture, enjoying the frosty season. As the winter ends and spring begins, the rising temperatures threaten to melt their creation. Determined to save the snow sculpture, Vanyusha and his companions embark on an extraordinary journey into deep space. They find a distant world where the sun has extinguished, leaving the planet in perpetual cold, and leave the snow sculpture there, safe from the warmth of spring.

However, their adventure takes a dangerous turn when they encounter a predatory comet that feeds on spacecraft. After narrowly escaping, they bring the comet back to their village on Earth, where they manage to tame and domesticate the once-hostile celestial entity, turning it into an unusual but welcome part of their community.

This film has elements of folk tales and science fiction genres.

== Creators ==
	English	Russian
Directors	Vladimir Danilevich, Olga Panokina	Владимир Данилевич, Ольга Панокина
Writer	Roman Kachanov Jr. (credit as R. Gubin)	Роман Качанов-младш. (псевдоним Р.Губин)
Art Director	Ekaterina Mikhailova	Екатерина Михайлова
Animators	Tatiana Molodova, Olga Panokina	Татьяна Молодова, Ольга Панокина
Puppets and decor	Natalia Barkovskaya, Nina Moleva, Natalia Grinberg, Youry Aksenov, Nadezhda Lyarskaya, Alexander Belyahev, Pavel Gussev, Vladimir Konobeyev	Наталия Барковская, Нина Молева, Наталия Гринберг, Юрий Аксенов, Надежда Лярская, Александр Беляев, Павел Гусев, Владимир Конобеев
Camera	Vladimir Sidorov	Владимир Сидоров
Music	N. Sokolov	Н. Соколов
Sound	Boris Filchikov	Борис Фильчиков
Executive Producer	Grigory Khmara	Григорий Хмара
Voice Actors	Aleftina Yevdokimova, Svetlana Kharlap, Boris Novikov, Stepan Bubnov, Alexandra Turgan, Vsevolod Larionov	Алефтина Евдокимова, Светлана Харлап, Борис Новиков, Александра Турган, Всеволод Ларионов
Editor	G. Filatova	Г. Филатова
Script Editor	Natalia Abramova	Наталья Абрамова

== See also ==
- "The Newcomer in The Cabbage"
- "Vaniusha and The Space Pirate"
- "Vaniusha and The Giant"
