= Demobbed (2000 film) =

Demobbed ДМБ
- Directed by: Roman Kachanov
- Written by: Roman Kachanov; Ivan Okhlobystin
- Produced by: Sergei Alekseyev; Maksim Garanin; Sergei Khotimsky
- Starring: Pyotr Korshunkov; Stanislav Duzhnikov; Mikhail Petrovsky; Sergei Artsibashev
- Cinematography: Anatoli Susekov
- Edited by: Albina Antipenko
- Music by: Pavel Molchanov
- Distributed by: Kinokompaniya Carmen
- Release date: 12 April 2000
- Running time: 88 minutes
- Country: Russia
- Language: Russian

Demobbed (Russian: ДМБ, romanized: DMB) is a cult Russian comedy film by Roman Kachanov, showing an absurdist view on the Russian army through the eyes of a conscript. The brutal rituals of Dedovshchina, a major problem within Russian society, is shown not as a tragedy, but as an idyllically insane process of resocialization.

Several stars of Soviet cinema cast in the roles of senior officers; prominent theater director Sergei Artsibashev portrayed the iconic protagonist Dikiy Prapor ("Wild Warrant Officer")

The film's popularity prompted the producers to create four sequels (DMB-2, DMB-3, DMB-4 and DMB-5), but with limited reception.

Three young Russians from very different walks of life involuntarily enter the military to escape their past.

== Plot ==
The film follows three young men with troubled pasts who are drawn into the Russian army in the 1990s. Vladislav Kashirsky, a university student expelled for a scandalous affair with the dean's wife; Anatoly Pestemev, a factory worker escaping charges after accidentally causing a fire; and Gena Bobkov, a gambler evading creditors, find themselves at the army's induction center among an eclectic group of recruits. The story, narrated by Gena, portrays conscription practices and the motley assortment of young men who are often reluctantly swept into service.

The film is divided into four novellas, each capturing a distinct aspect of the recruits’ journey. In the first novella, they meet warrant officer Kazakov, who leads them in a chaotic journey to their base. In "The Slap", the trio faces intense hazing from senior soldiers and a series of mishaps that slowly bond them. In "The Samurai Boar", the recruits are tasked with preparing a makeshift farm for a general's visit, leading to bizarre adventures involving local widows, drunken officers, and a boar hunt gone awry. The film concludes with a darkly humorous swearing-in ceremony, with Gena reflecting on the resilience required to endure military life. Each novella highlights the absurdities, struggles, and unlikely camaraderie forged within the conscripted ranks.

== Cast ==
- Pyotr Korshunkov as private Gennady "Bullet" Bobkov
- Stanislav Duzhnikov as private Anatoly "Bomb" Pistemeyev
- Mikhail Petrovsky as private Vladislav "Bayonet" Kashirsky
- Sergei Artsibashev as warrant officer Nikolay Kazakov ("the Wild Praporshchik")
- Ivan Okhlobystin as the military counterintelligence officer
- Viktor Pavlov as General Talalayev ("the Father")
- Aleksandr Belyavsky as the counter admiral
- Juozas Budraitis as the air force lieutenant general
- Vladimir Shainsky as the veteran general
- Aleksandr Dedyushko as the major of the military patrol
- Roman Kachanov as Gera Lieberman, the toxicomaniac quartermaster
- Aleksei Panin as the private
- Valeriy Troshin as the Krishnaist

== Awards ==
=== International awards ===
- 2000 — Demobbed — FIPRESCI Special Mention: «For its humour and for the ironic look on Russian society which allows to overcome tragedies of everyday life and might open doors to the new cinema.

=== Selected national awards ===
- 2000 – Russian Guild of Film Critics Best Screenplay (Roman Kachanov, Ivan Okhlobystin).
- 2000 — Kinotavr Special Jury Prize
