= Aleksandr Dedyushko =

Russian actor (1962–2007)

Aleksandr Viktorovich Dedyushko
- Born: Aliaksandr Dziadziushka; May 20, 1962; Vawkavysk, Byelorussian SSR, Soviet Union
- Died: November 3, 2007 (aged 45); Petushki, Vladimir Oblast, Russia
- Occupation: Actor

Aleksandr Viktorovich Dedyushko (Russian: Алекса́ндр Ви́кторович Дедю́шко; May 20, 1962 – November 3, 2007) was a Russian television actor, best known for war dramas and the Russian version of Dancing with the Stars.

== Life ==
Born as Aliaksandr Dziadziushka (Belarusian: Аляксандр Дзядзюшка, Dziadziushka) in Vawkavysk, Hrodna Voblast, Belarus, he worked with the Vladimir City Theatre from 1989 until 1995. Starting in the early 2000s, Dedyushko became a popular Russian television presenter, actor and singer.

== Death ==
Dedyushko was killed along with his wife and son in a car accident on November 3, 2007, in Petushki, Vladimir Oblast, Russia. Their car apparently skidded on an ice-covered road.

== Selected filmography ==
- Taras Bulba (2009)
- A Driver for Vera (2004)
- Brigada (2002)
- Demobbed (2000)
- The Barber of Siberia (1998)
- Mother (1989)

== External links and references ==
- Aleksandr Dedyushko at IMDb
- Official website of the memory actor (in Russian)
