= Stealing Tarantino =

- Written by: Aleksandr Gorshanov; Roman Kachanov
- Story by: Irakli Kvirikadze; Andrei Zhitkov
- Directed by: Roman Kachanov
- Starring: Pyotr Fyodorov; Bohdan Stupka; Lyudmila Gurchenko; Angelina Chernova; Pavel Derevyanko
- Theme music composer: Aleksandr Pantykin
- Country of origin: Russia
- Original language: Russian
- No. of episodes: 8

Production
- Producers: Irakli Kvirikadze; Sergei Skvortsov; Arkadi Tsimbler; Denis Yevstigneyev
- Cinematography: Dmitri Yashonkov
- Editors: Irakli Kvirikadze; Roman Sheyin
- Running time: 323 minutes

Original release
- Release: January 2 – January 12, 2006

Stealing Tarantino (Russian: Взять Тарантину, romanized: Vzyat Tarantinu) is a 2006 Russian comedy-crime miniseries by director Roman Kachanov. It is in both English and Russian. Actors in the 8-episode miniseries include Cathy Carlson, Steve Fix, and Dave Fraunces.

== Plot ==
The film revolves around a group of wealthy Kalmyk Russians who, captivated by cinema, decide to showcase a film of the highest artistic value at their children's wedding. They set their sights on a new Quentin Tarantino film, which hasn't yet been released. Tarantino, portrayed by actor Yegor Barinov, becomes the target of their scheme.

To secure a high-quality copy of the film, the Kalmyks dispatch representatives to the United States. Their first attempt at stealing the film ends in failure. For their second attempt, they recruit a film critic known as "Fellini" and a young adventurer named Max. However, the operation ends in complete disaster. Max, drinking away his frustration in a bar, confides the entire failed plan to a stranger, who turns out to be Tarantino himself. Surprisingly, Tarantino hands Max a copy of the film.

The heist saga concludes as Max returns to the village with the film. In the final scene, an elder named Namto is asked, "What is the meaning of life?" to which he replies, "Give me more gum!"

== See also ==
- Stealing Pulp Fiction - a 2024 American film with a similar premise.
