= Vaniusha and The Giant =

Vaniusha and The Giant Ванюша и космический пират
- Directed by: Vladimir Danilevich
- Written by: Roman Kachanov Jr. (credit as R. Gubin)
- Starring: Aleftina Yevdokimova, Svetlana Kharlap, Boris Novikov, Ludmila Gnilova, Rogvold Sukhoverko, Vladimir Ferapontov
- Narrated by: Vsevolod Larionov
- Cinematography: Vladimir Sidorov
- Edited by: Galina Filatova
- Music by: Yevgeny Botiarov
- Release date: 1993
- Running time: 10 min
- Country: Russia
- Language: Russian

Vaniusha and The Giant (Russian: Ванюша и великан) is a 1993 Russian stop-motion animation film by Vladimir Danilevich. This film was produced by Soyuzmultfilm studio.
The film is about The Friendly Newcomer from another planet.
The film is the fourth film of the tetralogy, which tells about the adventures of The Newcomer Vaniusha and his friends. The first three films are The Newcomer in The Cabbage, Vaniusha The Newcomer and Vaniusha and The Space Pirate.

== Plot summary ==
The friends go to the distant past, many-many centuries ago. There they help The Good-Natured Giant. The Evil Knights and The Dragons hurt The Good-Natured Giant. Vaniusha with his friends help the giant and take him in their village, in the our century.

In the plot of this film are mixed the elements of the folk tales and science fiction stories.

== Creators ==
	English	Russian
Director	Vladimir Danilevich	Владимир Данилевич
Writer	Roman Kachanov Jr. (credit as R. Gubin)	Роман Качанов-младш. (псевдоним Р. Губин)
Art Director	Ekaterina Mikhailova	Екатерина Михайлова
Animators	Tatiana Molodova, Sergei Kositsyn	Татьяна Молодова, Сергей Косицын
Puppets and decor	Anna Vetukova, Alexander Maximov, Nadezhda Lyarskaya, Sergei Popov, Natalia Barkovskaya, Valery Petrov, Victor Grishin, Vladimir Alisov, Youry Aksenov, Nina Moleva	Анна Ветюкова, Александр Максимов, Надежда Лярская, Сергей Попов, Наталья Берковская, Валерий Петров, Виктор Гришин, Владимир Алисов, Юрий Аксенов, Нина Молева
Camera	Vladimir Sidorov	Владимир Сидоров
Music	Yevgeny Botiarov	Евгений Ботяров
Sound	Boris Filchikov	Борис Фильчиков
Executive Producer	Alina Vlasova	Алина Власова
Voice Actors	Aleftina Yevdokimova, Svetlana Kharlap, Boris Novikov, Vsevolod Larionov, Ludmila Gnilova, Rogvold Sukhoverko, Vladimir Ferapontov	Алефтина Евдокимова, Светлана Харлап, Борис Новиков, Всеволод Ларионов, Людмила Гнилова, Рогволд Суховерко, Владимир Ферапонтов
Artist	T. Bogdanova	Т. Богданова
Editor	G. Filatova	Г. Филатова
Script Editor	Natalia Abramova	Наталья Абрамова

== See also ==
- "The Newcomer in The Cabbage"
- "Vaniusha The Newcomer"
- "Vaniusha and The Space Pirate"
