= O Lucky Man! (2009 film) =

- Directed by: Edouard Parri
- Written by: Alexander Zelenko
- Produced by: Yuri Minzyanov; Vladislav Ryashin
- Cinematography: Ilya Melikhov
- Music by: Anton Silayev
- Production company: Star Media
- Release date: August 1, 2009
- Running time: 85 minutes
- Country: Russia
- Language: Russian
- Box office: $959 944

O Lucky Man! (Russian: О, счастливчик!, romanized: O, schastlivchik!) is a 2009 Russian comedy film directed by Edouard Parri.

== Plot ==
Slavik is an ordinary guy. At the age of 26, he finds his life empty and uninteresting. Not having a decent job, he cannot find a girl. Slavik loves extreme sports, and at some point he decides to just stand on the edge of the bridge.

But suddenly two men appear - Oleg Genrihovich and Konstantin Germanovich, who think that Slavik wants to commit suicide. They convince Slavik that suicide is not a way out of the situation. They suggest that he create a new biography for himself, which includes knowledge of foreign languages, the end of the Brainstone University and work in Italy.

With such data, he is employed by a large company as a regional director. He is offered to start a new prosperous life. And Slavik immediately has new problems.

It turns out that the "wizards" Oleg and Konstantin did not seem to wish Slavik happiness, but wanted him to die like a real man. He gets more trouble, and his new girlfriend Alice spends all the money she gets.

Slavik understands that this can not continue any longer, throws down his "fabulous" work and returns to his past life, taking with him his friend Morpheus from the virtual world. Now this life seems to be full of colors for them.

As a result, it turns out that the "old men" by way of a series of interesting adventures have led him to a romantic relationship with a normal girl.

== Cast ==
- Mikhail Tarabukin - Slavik Razbegayev
- Polya Polyakova - Alisa Grace
- Vladimir Menshov - Oleg Genrikhovich
- Sergey Shakurov - Konstantin Germanovich
- Vladimir Kristovsky - Morpheus
- Maxim Konovalov - Thick
- Aleksei Panin - Thin
- Andrey Merzlikin - Sanya-Frigate
- Igor Kovalenko - Aslan
- Semyon Furman - Director Viktor Sergeevich
- Vyacheslav Razbegaev - Agent Michael
- Aleksandr Bashirov - Perelman
- Sergey Veksler - Ramiz
- Armen Dzhigarkhanyan - Grandfather Ramiz
- Elena Labutina - Lena
