= Liya Akhedzhakova =

Soviet and Russian actress (born 1938)

- Лия Ахеджакова
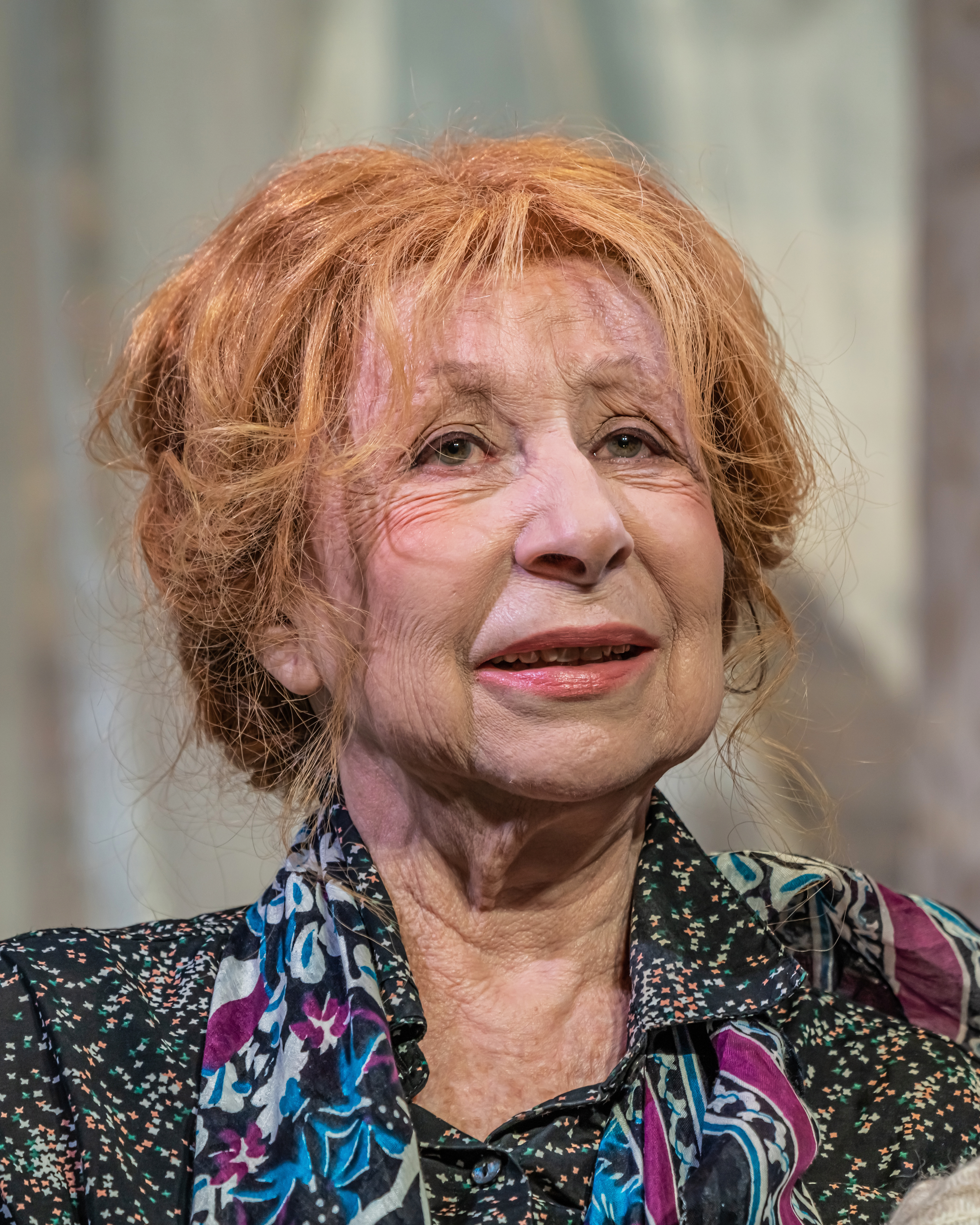
- Akhedzhakova in 2023
- Born: Liya Mejidovna Akhedzhakova; 9 July 1938 (age 88); Dnipropetrovsk, Ukrainian SSR, Soviet Union
- Citizenship: Soviet (1938–1991); Russian (1991–present)
- Education: Russian Academy of Theatre Arts
- Occupation: Actress
- Years active: 1961–present
- Notable work: The Irony of Fate (1975), Office Romance (1977), The Garage (1979), Sons of Bitches (1990), Promised Heaven (1991), Playing the Victim (2007)
- Spouses: Valery Nosik; Boris Kocheishvili; Vladimir Persiyanov
- Parent: Yuliya Akhedzhakova

Liya Mejidovna Akhedzhakova (Russian: Лия Меджидовна Ахеджакова; born 9 July 1938) is a Soviet and Russian film, stage and voice actress who received the title of People's Artist of Russia in 1994. She received two Nika Awards as the best supporting actress and the 2014 Nika Honorary Prize.

== Biography ==
Akhedzhakova was born in Dnepropetrovsk (modern-day Dnipro, Ukraine). She grew up in a theatrical family in Maykop. Her stepfather, Mejid Salehovich Akhedzhakov (1914–2012), was a Circassian nobleman who served as the Principal Director of the National Theatre of the Republic of Adygea. Her mother, Yuliya Alexandrovna Akhedzhakova (1916–1990), was also an actress at the same drama theatre. At the age of 10, when her mother and aunt were suffering from tuberculosis, she wrote a letter to Joseph Stalin with a request for help. In response, a rare drug was delivered to her family.

In 1956, she entered the Moscow Institute of Nonferrous Metals and Gold where she studied for eighteen months. She first appeared on stage in 1961 at Moscow Youth Theatre. In 1962, she graduated from Lunacharsky State Institute for Theatre Arts (GITIS). Her first film appearance was in Russian: Ищу человека, romanized: Ischu cheloveka, lit. 'Looking for a man' (1973). Her debut in this drama was awarded several prizes at international film festivals in Locarno, Switzerland and Varna, Bulgaria. In 1977 she joined the Sovremennik Theatre. In 1986 she played four main roles in the play Apartment Columbine directed by Roman Viktyuk.

As a film actress, Liya Akhedzhakova became widely known due to her roles in Eldar Ryazanov's films, including Tanya in The Irony of Fate (1975), Verochka in Office Romance (1977), Malaeva in The Garage (1979), and Fima in Promised Heaven (1991). In the 2000, film Old Hags, she played alongside her stepfather.

== Personal life ==
Akhedzhakova's first husband was Valery Nosik, an actor of Moscow Pushkin Drama Theatre and Maly Theatre. Her second husband was artist and poet Boris Kocheishvili. In the summer of 2001, Liya Akhedzhakova married the Moscow-based photographer Vladimir Persiyanov.

== Political views ==
During the 1993 Russian constitutional crisis, on the night before the storming of the White House, Akhedzhakova and several other popular actors attended a live broadcast at the "reserve studio" outside of the Ostankino Technical Center. She expressed support to Boris Yeltsin while also criticized the army for "not protecting us" from the old Soviet Constitution and encouraged people "to wake up," or "the Communists will return." Yeltsin watched the broadcast in his office. He later wrote in his memoirs, "I will always remember Akhedzhakova – shocked, fragile, but firm and courageous." She was criticized for her speech by Alexander Prokhanov, Alexander Rutskoy, Stanislav Govorukhin and others who blamed intelligentsia for escalating the conflict.

Akhedzhakova is a critic of contemporary Russian politics. She has protested the law that prohibits adoption of Russian children by US citizens, the persecution of Mikhail Khodorkovsky and the incarceration of Vasily Aleksanyan. Together with Eldar Ryazanov, Yuri Shevchuk, Andrey Makarevich, Andrei Konchalovsky and others, she has expressed opposition to Russia's policy toward Ukraine. Following the shootdown of Malaysia Airlines Flight 17, she publicly read a poem by Andrey Orlov, Requiem for MH17, where he apologized as a Russian for the incident. In 2013, Akhedzhakova received a prize from the Moscow Helsinki Group for "the protection of human rights by means of culture and arts." She spoke out in opposition to the 2022 Russian invasion of Ukraine.

According to Eldar Ryazanov, "she sympathizes with the weak, and despises the cruel. In this, her artistic credo coincides with the stance of the great Chaplin."

In April 2023, Russian- and English-language independent news website Meduza reported that Vitaly Borodin, head of the Federal Security and Anti-Corruption Project, asked Russia's Prosecutor General to launch a criminal case against Akhedzhakova. He claimed that Akhedzhakova has criticized “the state organs’ and the president's decisions and policies with regard to the Russian invasion of Ukraine. He accused the actress of "treason" and "discrediting" the armed forces. Akhedzhakova denied the allegations. Borodin recommended labeling Akhedzhakova a "foreign agent". As a result of these accusations, she had to leave Sovremennik Theatre, where she had been working for many years.

== Honours and selected awards ==
| Year | Award | Category | Work | Result |
|---|---|---|---|---|
| 1970 | Honored Artist of the RSFSR | | | Won |
| 1973 | Prize of the 8th International Film Screening in the Red Cross and Red Crescent in Varna | | | Won |
| 1975 | Prize of the 8th All-Union Film Festival in Chișinău | Sports Films | | Won |
| 1979 | Vasilyev Brothers State Prize of the RSFSR | Laureate of RSFSR State Prize | Office Romance | Won |
| 1991 | Nika Award | Best Supporting Actress | Promised Heaven | Won |
| 1994 | People's Artist of Russia | | | Won |
| 1999 | Order of Honour | | | Won |
| 2001 | "Olmypia" National Award | National Prize of Public Recognition for Women's Achievements | | Won |
| 2006 | Order "For Merit to the Fatherland" | Cavalière (4th class) | | Won |
| 2006 | Nika Award | Best Supporting Actress | Playing the Victim | Won |
| 2008 | Star of Theatre Prize | | | Won |
| 2008 | Award of "Star teatral" | Civic Courage | | Won |
| 2013 | Award of "Star teatral" | Best Actress | | Won |
| 2013 | Award of the Moscow Helsinki Group | | | Won |
| 2014 | Nika Award | Honorary Prize | | Won |

== Selected filmography ==
=== Film ===
| Year | Title | Role | Notes |
|---|---|---|---|
| 1968 | The Return | Petya | |
| 1970 | The Blue Bird | Young boy | Voice |
| 1970 | Valiant Robin Hood | Little John | Voice |
| 1973 | Glasha and Kikimora | Pioneer cyclist | Voice |
| 1973 | Looking for a Man | Anna Kuznetsova | |
| 1974 | Tanya | Mistress, housekeeper | |
| 1974 | Ivan and Marya | Princess Agrippina | |
| 1975 | The Irony of Fate, or Enjoy Your Bath! | Tanya, Nadya's friend | Television film |
| 1975 | Poshekhonskaya Starina | Polka | |
| 1975 | Near the Black Sea | Viola Smyr | |
| 1976 | In Secret to the Whole World (Po sekretu vsemu svetu) | Yelizaveta Nikolaevna, geography teacher | |
| 1976 | Twenty Days Without War | Clock woman | |
| 1977 | Zhikharka | Zhikharka | Voice |
| 1977 | Two Maples | Ivanushka | Voice |
| 1977 | Crane in the Sky | Roza Kozodoeva | |
| 1977 | Office Romance | Vera "Verochka," secretary | |
| 1978 | The Handsome Man | Lupacheva | Television film |
| 1978 | When I Will Become a Giant | Julietta Ashotovna, nicknamed “Smiley,” English teacher | |
| 1978 | Black Wizard's Gift | Pugalitsa | |
| 1979 | Speak My Language | Claudia | |
| 1979 | Moscow Does Not Believe in Tears | Olga Pavlovna, club manager | |
| 1979 | The Garage | Malaeva | |
| 1980 | Say a Word for the Poor Hussar | Loulou | Television film |
| 1981 | The Eighth Wonder of the World | Yuliya Yermolina | |
| 1981 | Where Did Fomenko Disappear to? | Alina | Television film |
| 1981 | Vacation at One's Own Expense | Irina | Television film |
| 1982 | Alice Through the Looking Glass | The White Queen/The Sheep | |
| 1983 | Some Things from the Provincial Life | Merchutkina | Television film |
| 1983 | Talisman | Grandmother | |
| 1983 | Mama Anush | Anush | |
| 1984 | Little Favor | Toma | Television film |
| 1984 | Copper Angel | Rosita | |
| 1984 | Fairy Autumn Gift | Fairy of sorrow | |
| 1986 | Ara, bara, pukh! | Alla | Voice |
| 1986 | Chameleon Game | Irma | |
| 1986 | Occasion | Violetta | |
| 1986 | Wingspan | First-class passenger (herself) | |
| 1987 | Dialog. The Mole and the Egg | Egg | Voice |
| 1987 | Another Life | Roza | |
| 1988 | Ferocious Bambr | Mouse | Voice |
| 1988 | A Sinner | Zina | |
| 1989 | Vagrant Bus | Zina, administrator | |
| 1989 | Sofia Petrovna | Maria Erastovna Kiparisova | |
| 1990 | Should a Hedgehog be Prickly? | Mother hedgehog | Voice |
| 1990 | In the Footsteps of Bambr | Mouse | Voice |
| 1990 | Doping for Angels | Nina | |
| 1990 | Sons of Bitches | Nanaytseva | |
| 1990 | Mordashka | Zoya Nikolaevna, Yuliya's mother | |
| 1991 | Glasha and Kikimora | Kikimora | Voice |
| 1991 | Trap for Bambr | Mouse | Voice |
| 1991 | For a Rainy Day | Mother Hedgehog | Voice |
| 1991 | Promised Heaven | Anthemia "Phima" Stepanovna | Nika Award for Best Actress (1991) |
| 1992 | Birth of Hercules | Olga's mother | Voice |
| 1992 | I Wanted to See the Angels | Zhenya's mother | |
| 1992 | Seven Forty | Tkachuk | |
| 1993 | Ant Hedgehog | Mother Hedgehog | Voice |
| 1993 | Abyss, Seventh Circle | Olga's mother | |
| 1994 | Tren-bren | Masha | |
| 1995 | Moscow Vacation | Speculator | |
| 1997 | Dandelion Wine | Lena Auffmann | |
| 2000 | Old Hags | Lyuba | |
| 2005 | Gorynych and Victoria | Violetta Polikarpovna Lurie | |
| 2006 | Playing the Victim | Waitress in Japanese restaurant | Nika Award for Best Actress (2007) |
| 2006 | Andersen. Life Without Love | Gadalkal | |
| 2006 | Strange Christmas | Lucia | Television film |
| 2007 | Potapov, to the Board! | Taisiya Ivanovna | |
| 2007 | Branch of Lilac | Anna Sergeevna, Zverev's wife | |
| 2007 | Thumbelina | Mouse | |
| 2007 | Photo of My Girl | Lyubov Grigorevna, Paul's mother | |
| 2007 | The Funeral Party | Mariya Ignatyevna, healer | |
| 2008 | Four Ages of Love | Zima | |
| 2009 | The Book of Masters | Baba Yaga | |
| 2009 | Bankrupt | Matchmaker | |
| 2010 | Love-Carrot 3 | Yelizaveta Nikolaevna | |
| 2011 | Ivan Tsarevich and the Grey Wolf | Baba Yaga | Voice |
| 2012 | Moms | Svetlana Semyonovna | |
| 2017 | The Meek | Human rights activist | |
| 2018 | Summer | Landlady | |
| 2021 | Halley's Comet | Yanga Lvovna Artemyeva, mother of Yulia Borisovna, grandmother of Taisiya and Daria | |
| 2022 | Golden Neighbors | Stepanovna | |

=== Television ===
| Year | Title | Role | Notes |
|---|---|---|---|
| 1977 | Know-Nothing In The Sunny City | Bukovka | Episode 7–8, voice |
| 2003 | Fifth Angel | Sara | |
| 2004 | Narrow Bridge | Nina Petrovna | TV mini-series |
| 2005 | Kazaroza | Mariya Antonovna | |
| 2011 | My Dear Man | Ashkhen Ovanesovna Oganyan | |
