= Go There, Don't Know Where =

- Поди туда, не знаю куда
- Directed by: Ivan Ivanov-Vano; Vladimir Danilevich
- Written by: Nikolai Erdman
- Based on: Russian fairy tale
- Narrated by: Georgy Vitsin; Dmitriy Zhuravlyov
- Edited by: Nina Mayorova
- Music by: Anatoliy Aleksandrov
- Production company: Soyuzmultfilm
- Release date: January 1, 1966 (USSR)
- Running time: 52 min. 21 sec.
- Country: USSR
- Language: Russian

Go There, Don't Know Where (Russian: Поди́ туда́, не зна́ю куда́, romanized: Podi tuda, ne znayu kuda) is a 1966 Soviet feature-length cutout-animated film. Produced at the Soyuzmultfilm studio, it was directed by Ivan Ivanov-Vano, widely regarded as the "Patriarch of Soviet animation." This film marked a rare venture into comedy for Ivanov-Vano.

The movie is a comedic adaptation based on motifs of Russian folk tales, particularly the story Go I Know Not Whither and Fetch I Know Not What. The screenplay, written by renowned Soviet screenwriter Nikolai Erdman, is preserved in the archives of the State Central Cinema Museum (collection 17, inventory 1, storage unit 20).

== Plot ==
Cheerful skomorokhs (traditional Russian jesters) tell the tale of a certain kingdom where a tsar lived. The tsar always carried a scepter in one hand and an orb in the other, and everyone called him "Your Imperial Majesty." The tsar had countless servants, including cooks, coachmen, bakers, apothecaries, barbers, bath attendants, court poets, and even a servant solely responsible for his royal chamber pot. Among his servants, the lowest-ranked was Sergei, a hunter who provided the tsar with various delicacies.

One day, Sergei ventured into the forest to catch a "delicacy," but luck was not on his side—he found no elk, grouse, or hare. Instead, he saw a kite attacking a white dove in the sky. Sergei took careful aim, and with a single shot, the kite was reduced to feathers. To his amazement, the dove transformed into a beautiful maiden, who declared that their paths were now joined, leading them to the altar. Sergei and the maiden began a happy life together.

When the old tsar learned of Sergei's good fortune, he grew envious and decided to ruin the hunter. However, Sergei overcame all the challenges set before him, aided by an invisible friend named Naum, who could even prepare a grand feast for the people. Ultimately, the tsar's wicked actions led to his downfall, while Sergei lived on in happiness and triumph.

== Creators ==
	English	Russian
Director	Ivan Ivanov-Vano	Иван Иванов-Вано
Second Director (First Assistant)	Vladimir Danilevich	Владимир Данилевич
Scenario	Nikalai Erdman	Николай Эрдман
Art Director	Marina Sokolova	Марина Соколова
Artists	Franchesca Yarbusova; V. Rodzhero; D. Naumov; Aleksandr Gorbachyov; G. Nevzorova; Aleksandr Rozhkov; M. Spasskaya	Франческа Ярбусова; В. Роджеро; Д. Наумов; Александр Горбачёв; Г. Невзорова; Александр Рожков; М. Спасская
Animators	Yuri Norstein; N. Zubova; Galina Zolotovskaya; Vyacheslav Shilobreyev; Joseph Douksha	Юрий Норштейн; Н. Зубова; Галина Золотовская; Вячеслав Шилобреев; Иосиф Доукша
Camera	Joseph Golomb	Иосиф Голомб
Executive Producer	Nathan Bitman	Натан Битман
Music	Anatoliy Aleksandrov	Анатолий Александров
Sound	Boris Filchikov	Борис Фильчиков
Script Editor	Natalya Abramova	Наталья Абрамова
Puppets and decorations	Y. Darikovich; Pavel Lesin; Valentin Ladygin; N. Budylova; V. Kuranov; I. Maksimova; Galina Gettinger; T. Alhazova; Marina Chesnokova; Liliana Lyutinskaya; Roman Gurov; V. Kalashnikova	Е. Дарикович; Павел Лесин; Валентин Ладыгин; Н. Будылова; В. Куранов; И. Максимова; Галина Геттингер; Т. Алхазова; Марина Чеснокова; Лилиана Лютинская; Роман Гуров; В. Калашникова
Narrators	Georgy Vitsin; Dmitriy Zhuravlyov	Георгий Вицин; Дмитрий Журавлёв
Editor	Nina Mayorova	Нина Майорова

== See also ==
- History of Russian animation
- List of animated feature films
- List of stop-motion films
