= Voronin's Family =

- Also known as: The Voronins
- Genre: Sitcom
- Created by: Philip Rosenthal
- Based on: Everybody Loves Raymond
- Written by: Anton Zaytsev; Pavel Oreshin; Mekhrali Pashayev; Nikolay Teterin; Andrei Vladimirenko; Sergei Kondrashin; Jeremy Stevens
- Directed by: Alexander Zhigalkin; Georgy Dronov; Aleksey Kiryushchenko
- Country of origin: Russia
- Original language: Russian
- No. of seasons: 24
- No. of episodes: 552

Production
- Producers: Vyacheslav Murugov; Konstantin Naumochkin; Artyom Loginov; Anton Shchukin
- Running time: 24 minutes
- Production companies: Where's Lunch (per licensing); Worldwide Pants (per licensing); Sony Pictures Television

Original release
- Network: STS
- Release: 16 November 2009 – 3 October 2019

The Voronins (Russian: Воронины, romanized: Voroniny) is a Russian adaptation of the American TV show Everybody Loves Raymond, broadcast from 2009 to 2019. Starting with the 211th episode to its 552nd (and final) episode, the show featured original scripts by the adaptation writers and Jeremy Stevens, a writer on the original American series.

The show's main stars are Georgy Dronov, Yekaterina Volkova, Boris Klyuyev, Stanislav Duzhnikov, Anna Frolovtseva. Duzhnikov gained 20 kg in order to get the role.

During the filming of the show's 455th episode, it was inducted into the Guinness Book of Records as the longest adapted television show in the world.

In 2015 the show was one of the top five most-watched Russian programs that were not series premieres.

== Cast ==
- Georgy Dronov as Konstantin "Kostya" Nikolaievich Voronin, a sports journalist of the newspaper "Sport", in the 390th episode moved to work at the publishing house "Global Sport News" (from season 1)
- Yekaterina Volkova as Vera Sergeievna Voronina (née Zolotaryova), a homemaker and an educated designer
- Anna Frolovtseva as Galina Ivanovna Voronina (née Korotkova), Kostya and Leonid's mother, retired, homemaker, former teacher at a music school (from season 1)
- Stanislav Duzhnikov as Leonid "Lyonya" Nikolaievich Voronin, captain/major/lieutenant colonel of the militsiya/police, Kostya's older brother, from the 140 series — Nastya's husband. In the 268th series, he retired from the ranks of the police, and in the 282nd episode he got a job at a university as a teacher of criminal law, from the 387th episode - head of the Department of criminal Law. In episode 447, he resigned from the institute. From 498 series — Lieutenant of the Ministry of Emergency Situations of Russia (from season 1).
- Boris Klyuyev as Nikolai Petrovich Voronin, a retired factory turner, who served in the Soviet Border Troops at the China–Russia border
- Mariya Ilyukhina as Mariya "Masha" Konstantinovna Voronina, Kostya and Vera's eldest child and first daughter.
- Filipp and Kirill Vorobyov-Mikhins (succeeded by Artyom and Roman Penchuks) as Kirill and Filipp Voronins, Kostya and Vera's identical twin sons. In 462 episodes they are sent to the cadet school (from season 1)
- Julia Kuvarzina as Anastasia Albertovna Voronina (nee Schwartz), Vera's friend and classmate, Leonid's second wife. Baptized as Isolde, her parents are Volga Germans by nationality. Designer by education, in 332 episode she got a job as a nanny in kindergarten (1-2, 4-24 seasons)
- Yuka Matveeva (seasons 11-14) / Anatoly Naumov (from season 15) as Alexander Leonidovich Voronin, son of Lenya and Nastya, was born on September 4, 2012 (since season 11)
- Polina Kuzmenko (season 15) / Sofya Khvashchinskaya (seasons 16-17) / Vera Tarasova (from season 18) as Lyudmila Konstantinovna Voronina, the younger daughter and youngest child of Kostya and Vera, who was born on May 21 (recorded on May 20), 2015 (from season 14)

== Critical reception ==
Website Vokrug TV deemed The Voronins "perhaps the most beloved family in Russia".

== Awards ==
- TEFI 2010 — in the nomination "Sitcom"
- Golden Rhinoceros Award 2011 — in the nomination "Best Supporting Actor" (received by Stanislav Duzhnikov)
- TEFI 2011 — in the nomination "Male actor in a TV movie/series" (received by Boris Klyuyev)
- National Children's Award "Main Characters" 2017 — in the nomination "The main actress" (received by Mariya Ilyukhina)
