= Juozas Budraitis =

Lithuanian actor (born 1940)

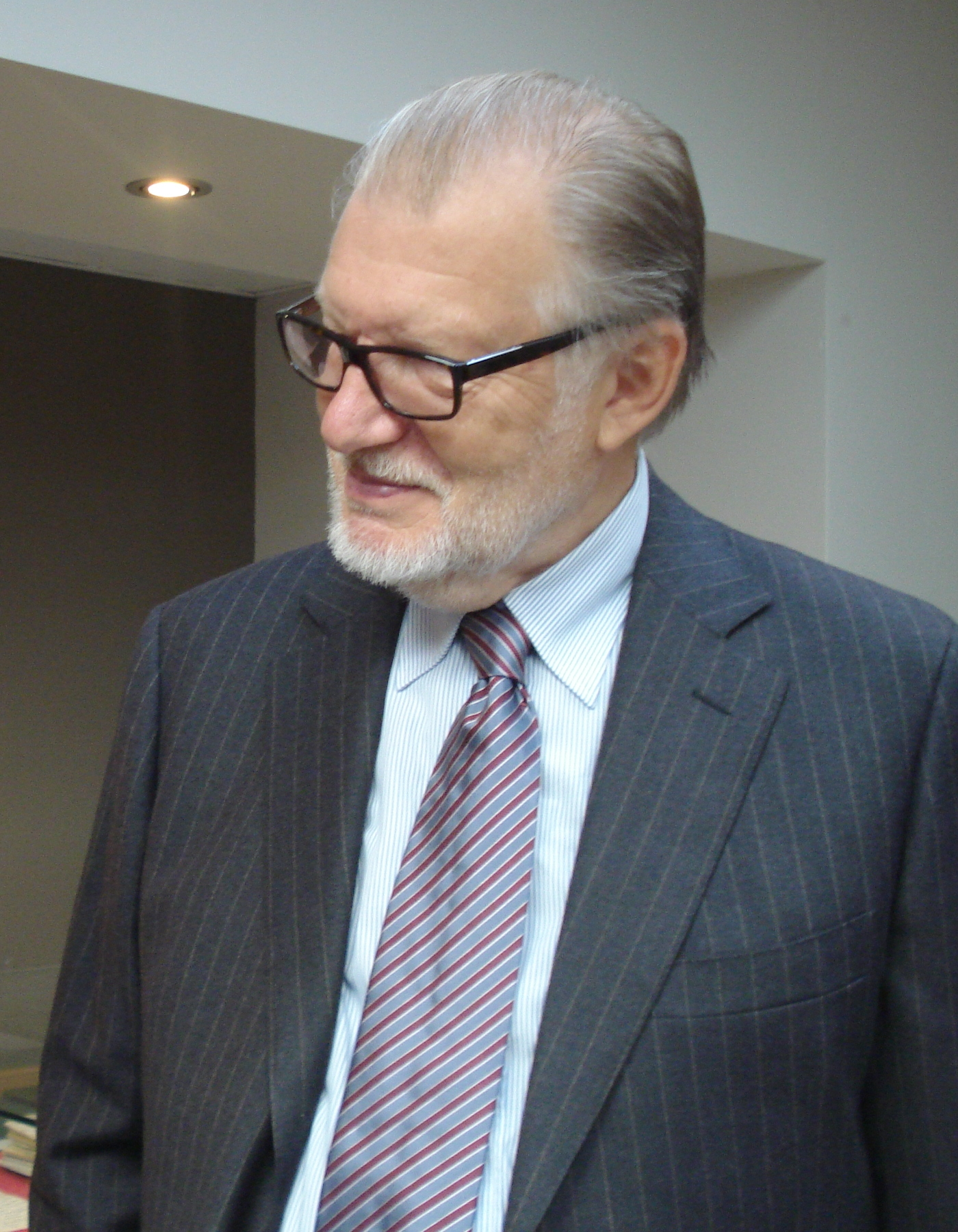
- Born: Juozas Stanislavas Budraitis; 6 October 1940 (age 85); Liepynai, Lithuanian SSR, Soviet Union
- Occupation: Actor
- Years active: 1966–present

Juozas Budraitis (born 6 October 1940) is a Lithuanian actor. He has appeared in more than 60 films and television shows since 1966. He starred in the Soviet film Wounded Game, which was entered into the 1977 Cannes Film Festival. Budraitis also played a minor role in the finale of the period drama miniseries The Queen's Gambit.

== Biography ==
Juozas Stanislavas Budraitis was born on 6 October 1940 in the village of Liepynai, Kelmė, Lithuanian SSR, Soviet Union in a peasant family. In 1945, the family moved to Klaipėda, and in 1955 – to the small town of Švėkšna.

In the years 1958-1960, Budraitis worked as a laborer at a training and production plant in Klaipėda. After serving in the army, he entered the law faculty of Vilnius University. During the third year of his studies, he was approved for one of the main roles in the Vytautas Žalakevičius film Nobody Wanted to Die which was released in 1966. Budraitis was already finishing his third year externally and afterwards transferred to the correspondence department. In 1968 he graduated from the university and started working as an actor at the Lithuanian Film Studios. By that time he had already become an established actor.

From 1968 to 1976 Budraitis was filming in the republic and in films of other Soviet directors. During this period, he starred in the films The Shield and the Sword (1967), Two Comrades Were Serving (1968), The Lanfier Colony (1969), White Dunes (1969), King Lear (1970) Ave Vita (1970), The Rudobel Republic (1971), That Sweet Word: Liberty! (1973), With You and without You ... (1973), Blockade (1974), Time does not Wait (1975), The Life and Death of Ferdinand Luce (1976), The Legend of Thiel (1976), The Lost House (1976).

In 1976-1978 Budraitis studied at the High Courses for Scriptwriters and Film Directors under the State Committee for Cinematography in Moscow. He then probationed as an assistant director on the set where his master and teacher was Žalakevičius. But the director's career of Budraitis did not work out after the failure of his debut film City of Birds (1982) based on the story of Yuri Olesha.

In 1980-1988 he was an actor of the Kaunas State Drama Theatre, where he acted in the plays Builder Solnes (1980), Sharunas (Prince of Dainavsky, 1980), Blue Horses on Red Grass (1982), Caligula (1983), Private (1985), The Home for the Elderly (1986).

In parallel with the work in the theater, the actor continued to play in films. In the 1980s, he starred in the films Life Is Beautiful (1979), Fairfax's Millions (1980), Dangerous Age (1981), Niccolo Paganini (1982), Honeymoon in America (1982), Confessions of his Wife (1984), Battle of Moscow (1985), The 13th Apostle (1988), The Sinner (1988), etc.

In 1983, Budraitis played one of the main roles in the television series The Rich Man, the Poor Man, based on the novel of the same name by Irwin Shaw, and also starred in the romantic comedy Carousel. These roles have made him one of the most sought-after actors of his generation.

In the 1990s, he starred in the films Under a Sky of Blue (1990), Mad Laurie (1991), Do not Ask Me About Nothing (1991), The Trail of the Rain (1991), The Tragedy of the Century (1993), The House on a Rock (1994), The Devil's Charm (1994), I do not know who I am (1995), etc.

At the same time, he continues to act actively in domestic and Russian films, such as Classic (1999), Demobbed (2000), Revenge is Sweet (2001), Down House (2001), Princess Slutskaya (2004), The Fall of the Empire (2005), Wolfhound (2006), Tanker Tango (2006), Yes You Will not be Judged ... (2007), Kromov (2009), Debt (2009), Armed resistance (2009), Black Arrow (2009), and others.

In February 2008, Juozas Budraitis performed for the first time on the Russian stage, having played one of the main roles in the new performance of the Presnyakov brothers PAB, the premiere of which took place in Theatrium on Serpukhovka.

In 2009, he acted in the play Cherry Orchard staged by the Finnish director Christian Smeds.

== Other activities ==
=== Art ===
Since the late 1960s Juozas Budraitis has been professionally engaged in photography. Personal exhibitions of Budraitis as photographer and artist were held in Vilnius, Kaliningrad, Nizhny Novgorod. His works are exhibited in prestigious galleries of Moscow and St. Petersburg. In the spring of 2010, an exhibition of works by Juozas Budraitis "Illusion" was launched in the "Gallery on Mosfilm", where he appeared in two roles: as model and photographer.

Member of the Lithuanian Union of Photo Artists, also a member of the Lithuanian Union of Cinematographers, the Union of Theatrical Figures and the Lithuanian Union of Photo Artists.

=== Culture ===
Since 1995, Budraitis has lived in Moscow, where he started working as a cultural adviser at the Lithuanian Embassy; in 2001 he became a cultural attaché at the Lithuanian Embassy in Russia. Being an attache, Budraitis immortalized the memory of the poet and diplomat Jurgis Baltrušaitis - he is one of the initiators of the establishment of the Baltrušaitis Foundation. The diplomat's house became the center of attraction of the Moscow intelligentsia and members of the Lithuanian society, as well as the venue for international scientific conferences.

Juozas Budraitis is also the author of a multi-year program of Lithuanian culture in Russia under the name "Window to Lithuania".

Efforts of Budraitis in the Moscow courtyard of foreign literature immortalized the memory of Mikalojus Konstantinas Čiurlionis, at the Moscow State University. MVLomonosov's Center of Baltic Statistics was opened.

In 2002 Budraitis was given the diplomatic rank of Extraordinary Envoy and Plenipotentiary Minister.

== Honors ==
People's Artist of the Lithuanian SSR (1982).

In 2000, for his great contribution to the preservation and development of Russian-Lithuanian cooperation in the field of culture, Juozas Budraitis was awarded the Order of Friendship.

In 2003, he was awarded the Commander's Cross of the Lithuanian Order of Merit for Lithuania.

In September 2010 he was awarded the Medal "For Merit in the Lithuanian Diplomatic Service".

== Selected filmography ==
- Nobody Wanted to Die (1966)
- The Shield and the Sword (1968)
- Feelings (1968)
- Two Comrades Were Serving (1968)
- The Lanfier Colony (1969)
- King Lear (1971)
- That Sweet Word: Liberty! (1973)
- Wounded Game (1977)
- Centaurs (1978)
- Life Is Beautiful (1979)
- The Big Night Bathe (1980)
- Fairfax's Millions (1980)
- Faktas (1981)
- Return from Orbit (1983)
- Battle of Moscow (1985)
- Day of Wrath (1985)
- The 13th Apostle (1988)
- The Red Flute (1989)
- Demobbed (2000)
- Down House (2001)
- Arie (2004)
- The Fall of the Empire (2005, TV)
- Wolfhound (2007)
- The Queen's Gambit (2020)
