= Roman Romanovich Kachanov =

Russian film director

Roman Kachanov
- Роман Качанов
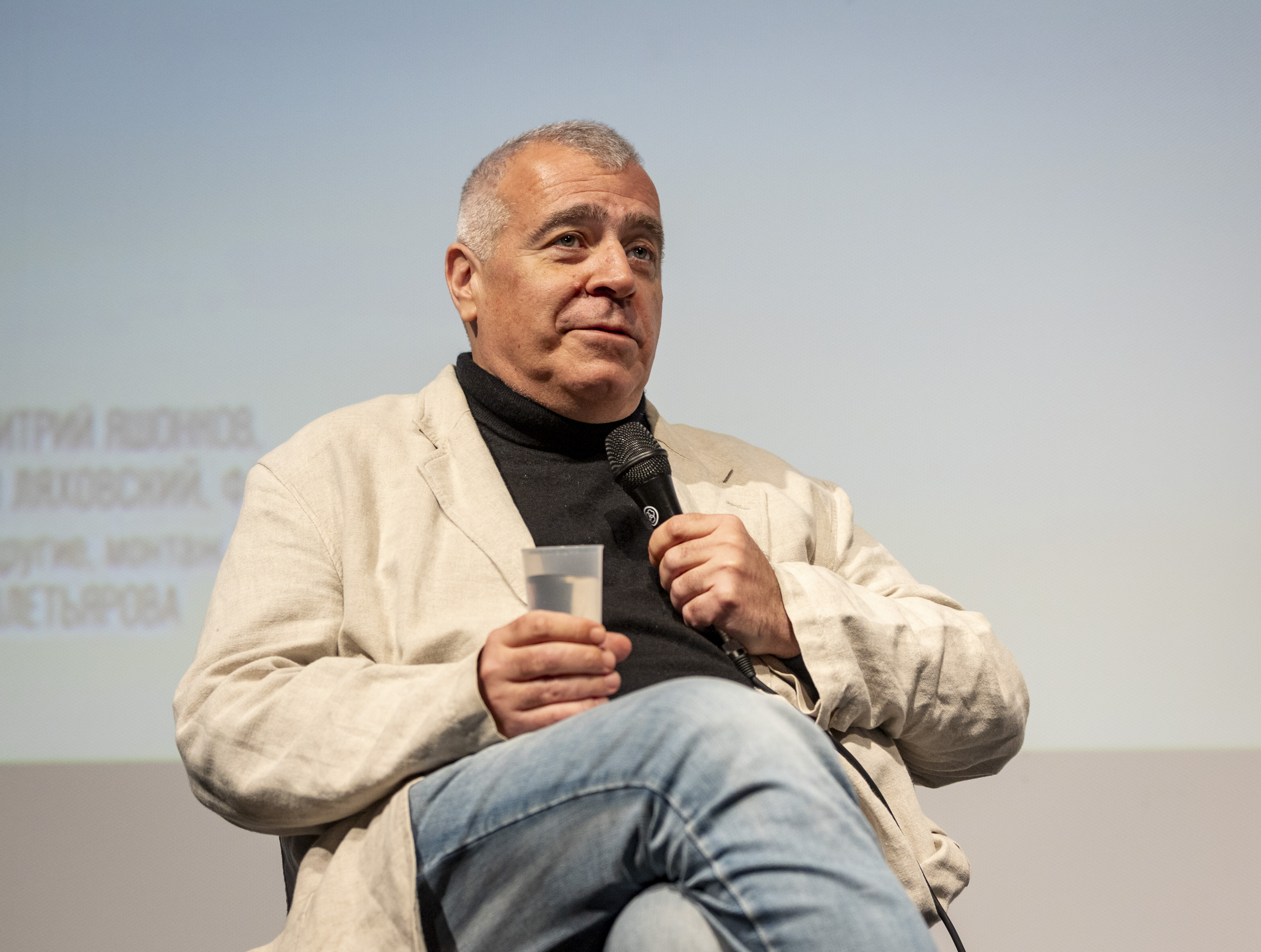
- Kachanov in 2023
- Born: 17 January 1967 (age 59); Moscow, Russian SFSR, Soviet Union
- Other names: Roman Kachnov, Jr.; Roman Kachanov II; Roman Kachanov ML.
- Occupations: Actor; film director; screenwriter
- Years active: 1982–present
- Spouse: Angelina Chernova (m. 2007)
- Awards: FIPRESCI (2000)

Roman Romanovich Kachanov (Russian: Роман Романович Качанов; born 17 January 1967) is a Soviet and Russian film director, screenwriter, actor, and producer. He is a film director and screenwriter of the films Demobbed, Down House, Tumbler, Arie, Gena Concrete and others. According to polls by the magazine “Afisha” and the blogging platform “LiveJournal”, his films belong to the 100 important Russian films and 100 best films of all time in the Russian language.

== Early life and education ==
Roman was born on 17 January 1967 in Moscow, USSR.

He began to work at the age of 14: first as a postman and later as a literature assistant to the writer Kir Bulychov. In 1982–1984, while going to night school, he attended a course of direction as an auditing student at the High Courses for Film Directors.

In 1984, he enrolled in the faculty of script writing at the All-Russian State Institute of Cinematography (VGIK), entered the course of Kira Paramonova. In the same year, he published the story "The Miracles of Technology" in the VGIK newspaper "The Way to the Screen", since then his writing career began. In 1985, at the animation studio "Soyuzmultfilm", a cartoon "The Miracles of Technology" was based on this story. Then Kachanov wrote the words to the song "Paper Dove" (composer Vladimir Shainsky).

In 1987, he wrote the play "Karpusha".. A cartoon of the same name was based on this play at Soyuzmultfilm in 1988. Later, a book based on it was published.

As a writer, Kachanov mainly works under the name R. Gubin in order not to be confused with his father, Roman Kachanov.

In 1988, he wrote the script for Ivan Okhlobystin's short film debut "Nonsense. The story about nothing".

Kachanov studied on the same course with Renata Litvinova and Arkady Vysotsky. On the parallel course Fyodor Bondarchuk, Aleksandr Bashirov, Ivan Okhlobystin, Tigran Keosayan, Bakhtyar Khudojnazarov, Rashid Nugmanov were studying at that time at the Directing Faculty.

Kachanov subsequently continued friendship and cooperation with many of them. He graduated from VGIK in 1989.

== Career ==
=== 1990s ===
In 1991, he made a film "Don't ask Me about the Thing". The film starred Juozas Budraitis, Emmanuil Vitorgan, Nina Ruslanova, Natalya Krachkovskaya, including some young actresses – Irina Feofanova, Maryana Polteva. Due to the economic difficulties, which appeared after the collapse of the Soviet Union, the film premiered only in 1995. Critics classify the film as "physiological cinema":

“Indeed, why do processes of eating, tearing and copulation now and then appear on the screen, and why are they more meaningful and cinematographic than coughing, running nose, vomiting, micturition, defecation and ejaculation are? [...] And the center of attraction for the characters [of the film] is the laboratory, where they are tested for spermogram”

— From the film review in "The Cyril and Methodius Encyclopedia of Cinema"

According to the chronology of the film's releases on the screens, Kachanov's debut work was the film "Freak", made in 1993. The film was produced at the Artistical Joint "Ekran". According to Kachanov, producer Menahem Golan played a significant role in the implementation of this project:

“Golan once made a film about Chicago during 30s in Moscow in 90s. The film "Mad Dog Coll". It was winter in 1991/1992. The scenery for Golan's film was placed in the Ostankino pavilions [...] Soviet rubles turned into paper at that time. We needed the money [for the film] so much. I found out where his room was at Ostankino. [...] He replied that he wouldn’t give me money, but he could help in something else. He said that he wouldn't dismantle the pavilions and sets until the end of his film editing, thus, another eight months were left. The sets will be located in the pavilions, they will be untouched with all stage property (furniture, carpets, artificial flowers in vases, and so on). He said that I could film using them for free. [...] After our first and last ten-minute acquaintance with him, [Golan's] sets and pavilions covered 80-90% of my film budget”.

The main roles in the film were played by Nikita Vysotsky and American rock singer Joanna Stingray. The film premiered in 1994 at the "Oktyabr" cinema, in the Central House of Cinema (DRC), on Channel 1 of Ostankino and at the film festival "Kinotavr" (competitive programme). The newspaper "Kommersant" wrote about it:

"There is nothing more ridiculous than the struggle between good and evil", Kommersant newspaper, 02/06/1994“The Roman Kachanov's picture "The Freak", made according to an excellent script by Ivan Okhlobystin, distinctly differ from all this severe and serious series of film narrations about the struggle between good and evil. [...] "Freak" is a great example of Russian comedic hoax which proves that there is nothing more ridiculous than dreadful one. [...] It was made as having been frightened by what is happening around you, but it was so easy and fun at the same time that we did not notice any trace of it in the end of the film”

— Inna Tkachenko, "There is nothing more ridiculous than the struggle between good and evil", Kommersant newspaper, 02/06/1994

From 1993 to 1997, Kachanov shot advertisements and music videos.

In 1998, he shot the low-budget film "Maximilian". The main roles in the film were played by Alexander Demidov (Kvartet I), Emmanuil Vitorgan, Nikita Vysotsky, Yevgeny Dvorzhetsky, Ivan Okhlobystin and others. The composer was Pavel Molchanov (the rock band "Time-Out").

=== 2000s ===
In 2000, Kachanov made a film "Demobbed", which told stories of three young people who ended up in military service. The following young actors played in the film for the first time: Stanislav Duzhnikov, Mikhail Petrovsky, Pyotr Korshunkov, Aleksei Panin, Mikhail Vladimirov and others. The film's stars of the Soviet cinema also played in the film: Viktor Pavlov, Juozas Budraitis, Aleksander Belyavsky, Sergei Artsibashev. The role of the war veteran general was played by Vladimir Shainsky. The music for the film was written by Pavel Molchanov. The official soundtrack also included songs by rock bands "Bakhyt-Kompot", "Time-Out", "Krematorij" and "Mango-Mango".

The film participated in Russian and international festivals. It was honored with awards and diplomas during most of them. The film was also awarded by the FIPRESCI (The International Federation of Film Critics) at the Kinotavr festival with the following special mention:

For its humour and for the ironic look on Russian society which allows to overcome tragedies of everyday life and might open doors to the new cinema.

— FIPRESCI

Film director Alexei Uchitel and critic Lidiya Maslova did not agree with the opinion on the film by the Guild of Russian Film Scholars and Film Critics and The International Federation of Film Critics: The just criticism of quite meticulous Uchitel called the awarding of the Roman Kachanov's "Demobbed" film the prize of the Guild of Russian Film Scholars and Film Critics and FIPRESCI.

"It turns out that critics really love anecdotes. I'll take it into account next time," Uchitel promised. Indeed, it is rather difficult to explain the awarding of "Demobbed" with something else except the love of rude soldier's humor – this picture does not contain any cinematographic value, and what foreign critics really understood in is just a mystery"

— Lidiya Malova Kommersant 16/06/2000

The film premiered at the Pushkinskiy cinema, the Central House of Cinema (DRC), the first multiple-screen cinema in Russia, the Karo multiplex on Sheremetyevskaya Street in Moscow, was opened with the screening of the "Demobbed" film. The TV premiere was on the RTR Channel. Later, the film received the recognition of widespread public. The film was quoted many times, remarks, and dialogues from Kachanov's film are part of the spoken usage. Scenes and screenshots from the film become Internet memes with the development of the Internet. After the film's success, a TV series was based on it but without Kachanov. It did not replicate the success of the film and receive the same recognition.

Later, "Demobbed" was recognized by the press and the audience as an iconic film. According to poll by the magazine "Afisha", the film was included in the 100 important Russian films.

In 2001, Kachanov filmed "Down House" based on Dostoevsky's novel "The Idiot". The film's soundtrack includes music by such bands and performers as Nike Borzov, DJ Groove, "Spring on Karl Johan Street", "NetSlov", "The knife for Frau Muller", and "Undervud". In "Down House" a Polish actress Barbara Brylska played for the first time in the new Russian cinema after a long break. Actor Fyodor Bondarchuk also played his first major role in the film. Non-professional actors such as Andrei Vasiliev (editor-in-chief of the newspaper "Kommersant"), Artemy Troitsky (editor-in-chief of the magazine "Playboy "), Miron Chernenko (chairman of the Guild of Russian Film Scholars and Film Critics) and others starred in small roles.

Immediately after the release, "Down House" was criticized, including the press. However, then "Down House", as well as "Demobbed", was recognized as an iconic film and was also quoted many times and it became the base for numerous Internet memes again.

Later, according to poll by LiveJournal, "Down House" was included in the 100 best films of all time in the Russian language. As for the view of the magazine "Kinoprocess", the film was declared the best film in the Russian language in 2001.

In 2002, Kachanov began to implement a huge film project called "Arie", the plot of which takes place in different times and countries. The production of the film took over two years and was completed in 2004. Foreign film companies were involved in the production of the film. The Russian participation in the project was represented by the Gorky Film Studio. The film is a participant and winner of domestic and foreign film festivals. Filming took place in Russia, Lithuania, and Israel. The main role is played by the Polish actor Jerzy Stuhr. Unlike other Kachanov's films, "Arie" does not look like an ordinary comedy, its plot twists are quite dramatic, but Kachanov, nevertheless, still insists that the film is a comedy.

In 2005, the 8-episode film "Stealing Tarantino" was released. The film was played by Pyotr Fedorov, Lyudmila Gurchenko, Bogdan Stupka, Pavel Derevyanko, Igor Zolotovitsky, and others.

In 2007, Kachanov made the film "Tumbler", it is a sports comedy about boxing. Several roles in the film were played by non-professional actors, but by sportsmen-boxers were Noel Andreson, Vitaly Kachanovsky and others.

In 2006–2007 Kachanov directed Tumbler, a sports comedy about the boxing. For greater authenticity, some of the roles were played by boxers rather than actors.

Kachanov's next project, Gena Concrete, began shooting in 2008. Production was frozen in 2009 after the primary investor declared temporary insolvency; in 2012 the Federal Fund of the National Cinematography decided to support the film, and Kachanov completed production in November 2013. The film was to premiere in 2014.

Kachanov also works as a script writer.

=== 2010s ===
In 2008, he began to direct the film "Gena Concrete" but during the filming in 2009 a private investor declared himself insolvent. Gosha Kutsenko, Renata Litvinova, Sergei Shnurov, Fyodor Bondarchuk, Alika Smekhova, Ivan Okhlobystin, Alexei Panin, Konstantin Murzenko, Anna Samokhina, Andrei Vasiliev, Artemy Troitsky, Olga Arntgolts, Andrei Fedortsov, Artur Vakha, and others played in the film. The production of the film continued until 2014, the film premiered in October of the same year.

=== 2020s ===
In the autumn of 2020, he began to make the feature motion picture "March of Dawn". Ivan Semyonov, Garik Sukachev, Artemy Troitsky, Nike Borzov, Zhanna Aguzarova, Anfisa Vistinghausen, Aleksandra Kiseleva, Varvara Komarova, Semyon Liseichev, Feliks Bondarev, Kuzma Kotrelev and others played in the film. "March of Dawn" is scheduled for release in the autumn of 2021.

== Public position ==
In the spring of 2022, Roman Kachanov spoke deprecatingly about Russian invasion of Ukraine, voicing his support for the people of Ukraine. Kachanov outlined his position in an interview with Ukrainian journalists Dmitry Gordon and Alesya Batsman, Russian journalist Ksenia Larina, in an interview with a blogger and political figure Mark Feygin, as well as in other interviews.

Roman Kachanov refused the premiere and film distribution of his new film "March of the Dawn" in Russia, in this regard, he formulated that he did not want to carry out an "information cover for the invasion" in this way.

“Russia Adds Director Roman Kachanov To 'Foreign Agent' List”

— "Radio Liberty" 06.21.2024

== Private life ==
His father was Roman Abelevich Kachanov, a famous Russian animator. His mother, Gara Kachanova, was an engineer-economist. Kachanov's parents died in 1993, when Roman was 26 years old. Roman Kachanov married the actress Anna Buklovskaya in 1998. They have two daughters, Polina and Alexandra, but the marriage broke up. Roman remarried to the actress and model Angelina Chernova; they have two daughters, Gara and Dina.

== Filmography ==
=== Film director ===
- Don't Ask Me About A Thing (1991)
- Freak (1993)
- Maximilian (1998)
- Demobbed (2000)
- Down House (2001)
- Arie (2003)
- Stealing Tarantino (2005)
- Tumbler (2007)
- Gena Concrete (2014)
- Favo (2017)
- Exchange (2018)
- March of Dawn (2022)

=== Screenwriter ===
- The Miracles of Technology (1986)
- Karpusha (1988)
- Nonsense. The story about nothing (1988)
- Vaniusha The Newcomer (1990)
- Vaniusha and The Space Pirate (1991)
- Don't ask me about a thing (1991)
- Glasha and Kikimora (1992)
- Vaniusha and The Giant (1993)
- Demobbed (2000)
- Down House (2001)
- Arie (2003)
- Tumbler (2007)
- Gena Concrete (2014)
- Ding ding, don't forget the wedding ring (2014)
- Lords of the dreams (2015)
- Exchange (2018)
- March of Dawn (2022)

=== Actor ===
- The Mystery of the Third Planet (1981) – Ushan on the Street (voice actor)
- The Destroyer of the Waves (1989) – The Passer
- Don't ask Me about the Thing (1991) – The Patient in the Queue
- Demobbed (2000) – The Quartermaster Lieberman
- Gena Concrete (2014) – The Killer
- March of Dawn (2022) – The Shepherd

== Selected awards ==
- 2000 – Demobbed – Golden Arie (National Award of Film-critics and the Film-press) "for the Best filmscript"
- 2000 – Demobbed – Kinotavr – Prize of the Guild of Russian Film Scholars and Film Critics"White Elephant"* 2001 – Down House – Kinotavr – Special Jury Prize"for the New cinema language search"* 2001 – Down House – Special Jury Prize"for the unprecedented adaptation of the novel of Fedor Dostoevsky Idiot"at the Russian festival in Gatchina
- 2004 – Arie – Prize"for the Best film"at the Russian festival Amursk autumn in Blagoveshensk
- 2013 – The Scroll of Honor of Russian Ministry of Culture"for substantial contribution to the national cinematography development"*
- 2013 – Demobbed – Film was included in the list of "100 main films of 1992–2013" according to the Russian cultural magazine Afisha.

=== International ===
- 2000 – Demobbed – FIPRESCI Prize:"for its humour and for the ironic look on Russian society which allows to overcome tragedies of everyday life and might open doors to the new cinema".
