= Stanislav Duzhnikov =

Russian actor of theater and cinema

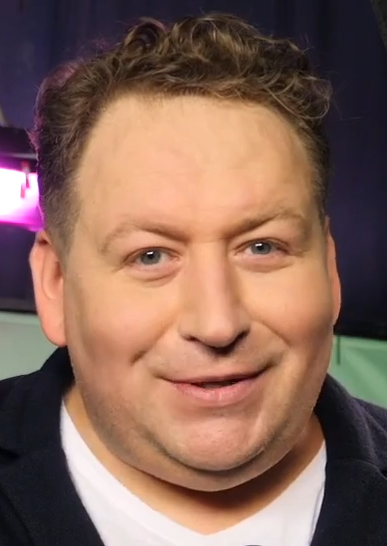
- Duzhnikov in 2019
- Born: Stanislav Mikhailovitch Duzhnikov; May 17, 1973 (age 52); Saransk, Mordovian ASSR, RSFSR, USSR
- Occupation: Actor
- Years active: 1995-present

Stanislav Mikhailovich Duzhnikov (Russian: Станисла́в Миха́йлович Ду́жников; May 17, 1973, in Saransk) is a Russian actor of theater and cinema.

== Biography ==
Stanislav Duzhnikov was born on May 17, 1973, in Saransk. On the stage he debuted at school. In 1998 he graduated from Boris Shchukin Theatre Institute.

== Personal life ==
Duzhnikov was married to actress Kristina Babushkina.

== Selected filmography ==
- 2000 Demobbed (ДМБ) as Tolya Pistemeyev
- 2002 Kamenskaya (Каменская) as Mikhail Dotsenko
- 2004 Down House (Даун Хаус) as Svinin
- 2005 The Turkish Gambit (Турецкий гамбит ) as Semyon Alekseev
- 2007 Paragraph 78 (Параграф 78) as Luba
- 2009 Voronin's Family (Воронины) as Lyonya Voronin
- 2010 Exporting Raymond as Lyonya Voronin
- 2012 The Ballad of Uhlans (Уланская баллада) as Ptukha
- 2013 Metro (Метро) as Mikhail
- 2021 Ivanov-Ivanov (Ивановы-Ивановы) as Boris Ivanov
