= Yekaterina Volkova (actress) =

Russian actress (born 1982)

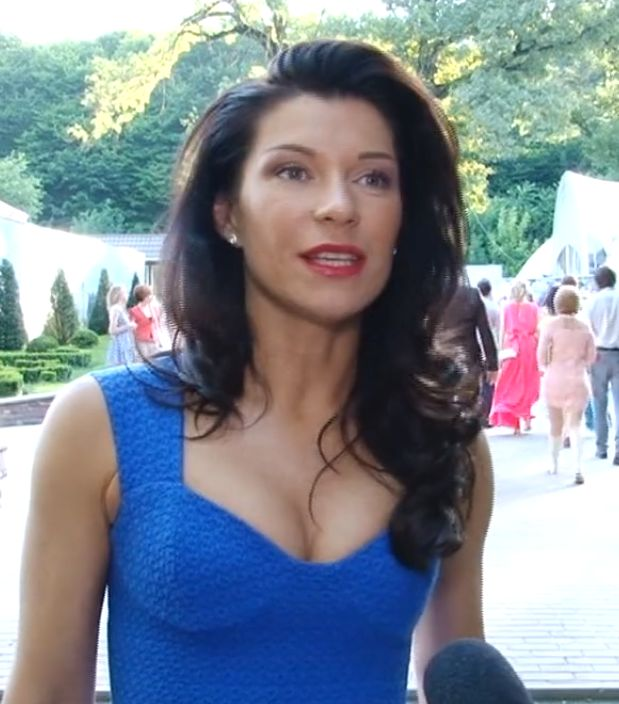
- Ekaterina Volkova in 2014
- Born: Yekaterina Valeryevna Volkova; 15 January 1982 (age 44); Tallinn, Estonian SSR
- Occupation: Actress
- Years active: 2005–present
- Spouse: Andrey Karpov
- Children: 1

Yekaterina Valeryevna Volkova (Russian: Екатерина Валерьевна Волкова; born 15 January 1982) is a Russian actress of theater, film and television. She is known for her television role in the Russian sitcom Voronin's Family (Воронины)—an adaptation of the American TV series Everybody Loves Raymond.

== Biography ==
In 2003, Yekaterina Volkova graduated from the Mikhail Shchepkin Higher Theatre School with honors and was accepted into the group of the State Theatre of film actor. In 2005, he was first taken to a small role in the documentary series Kulagin and Partners. Since 2006, Volkova began acting in the TV series Love Is as Love, Who's the Boss?, and Montecristo. In 2006 she graduated from the Academy of Budget and Treasury of the Ministry of Finance with honours. In 2009, she was invited to play a major role in the Russian sitcom Voronin's Family. In 2010 and in 2012, Volkova shot for the magazine Maxim, and was the winner for 2010.

== Personal life ==
On 9 April 2010, she married dancer Andrey Karpov, whom she met a year before the wedding. The couple have a daughter, Elizaveta (born 2011).

== Filmography ==
- 2005 Kulagin and partners (TV Series) as Marta
- 2006–2008 Who's the Boss? (TV Series) as Masha
- 2006–2007 Love as love (TV Series) as banker
- 2006 I stay as Larisa
- 2007 Agency "Alibi" (TV Series) as Alena
- 2008 Montecristo (TV Series) as Marianna
- 2008 Christmas ambush as major Kovalyova
- 2008 Verdict as Katya
- 2008 Man in black as Elvira
- 2009 Crazy Angel (TV Series) as Vika
- 2009 Pathfinder. On the trail of golden horse (TV Series) as Marina
- 2009 People Shpak as Khomyachkova
- 2010 Be my wife! (TV Series) as Polina
- 2009–2015 Voronin's Family (TV Series) as Vera Voronina (Zolotaryova)
- 2010 Reflections (TV Series) as Larisa
- 2016 Survival lessons as Nina, Kolya's mother
