= Boris Kocheishvili =

Russian artist and poet (born 1940)

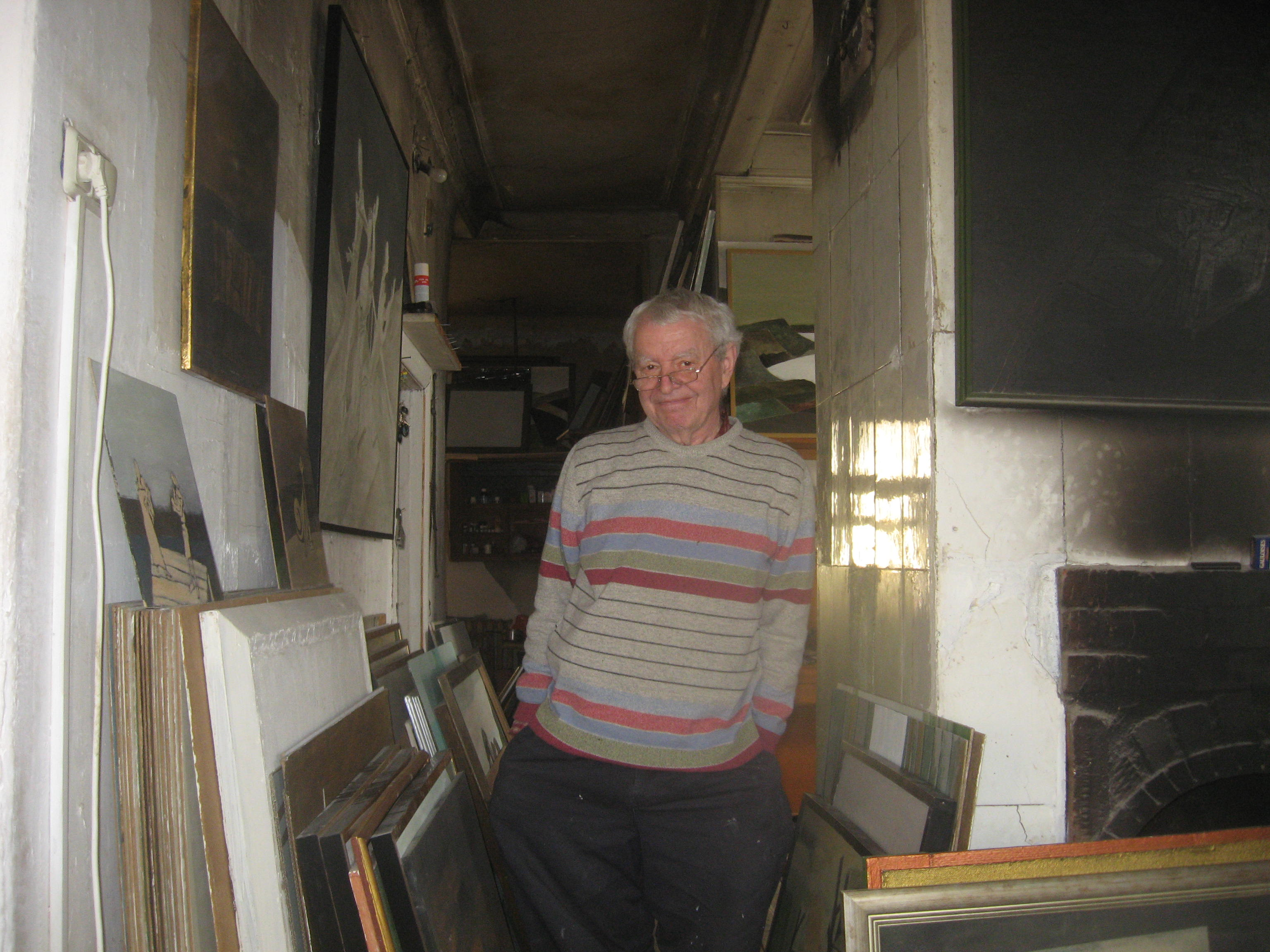
- Born: April 1, 1940 (age 86); Elektrostal, USSR
- Website: http://www.kocheishvili.ru/

Boris Petrovich Kocheishvili (Russian: Бори́с Петро́вич Кочейшви́ли; born April 1, 1940) is an artist and poet who lives and works in Moscow, Russia. His works are in the collections of Tretyakov Gallery, Russian Museum, Pushkin Museum, Museum Ludwig (Germany), various museums and galleries in Russia, private collections of George Costakis (Greece), Cristina Barbano and Alberto Sandretti (Italy), Arina Kovner (Switzerland), Michael Alshibai and Vladimir Semenov (Moscow) and other private collections in Russia and abroad.

== Biography ==
Boris Kocheishvili began his career as an artist starting back in the 1960s. Over the years Kocheishvili has explored different artistic techniques, experimenting with the potential of various media, attaining great expressiveness, often leading in completely new artistic territory.

In the 1960s, after graduating from Moscow Art College “Memory of the 1905 Revolution”, Boris Kocheishvili worked for several years at the Nivinsky Etching Studio. He showed in a 1963 Moscow exhibition of prints at the Pushkin Museum along with Illarion Golitsyn and Oleg Kudryashov.

Kocheishvili later experimented with Indian ink and chalk on paper to create several hundred pieces in which he explored abstract qualities of the contrast of black and white in innovative ways. In his art images of women, architectural fantasies, flowers, and a variety of other subjects fill a boldly charged, rhythmically patterned graphic space. Seeking to decipher the basic structure of the image, Kocheishvili has made many stylistic discoveries. In the body of his work, subjects flow from piece to piece, creating an interwoven universe of rhythms and patterns.

At the end of the 1960s Boris Kocheishvili turned to painting with oil. Working on a larger scale, using techniques discovered over years of experimentation with India ink he created refined, almost monochrome works. His oil paintings retain the subtlety and graphic impact of his earlier works.

In the 1980s Kocheishvili produced an extensive series of pastels that are distinguished by elegant color and a precision of hard edged line using a “dry fresco” technique.

In the 1990s, the artist moved to relief sculpture, developing an individual approach to the venerable tradition. Using plaster and papier-mâché, he created vivid all white compositions that seen in bright light produce a lively play of dancing shadows. The art critic Valerii Turchin said, “In the reliefs of Boris Kocheishvili, as in his prints, we see the birth of form/shape itself. His works achieve a unique aesthetic level.”

A series of black-and-gold works, crafted in black fiberboard from which mysterious shadows and golden figures emerge, also belong to this period.

Beginning in 2000, the artist started working more and more with color. He has said that only after he turned 60 did he become seriously interested into wet paint. Boris Kocheishvili paints with acrylics as if they were watercolors, only sometimes turning to impasto painting oil techniques. In the winter of 2009 the artist once again returned to the technique of reliefs – “painting with plaster”, which reflects his involvement with artistic illusionism. Using only his metal tool and a palette knife oil painting technique, the artist is able to create elegant figures, objects, forms. Painted in a copper or gold tone, his works come out looking like cast figures, at the same time acquiring an unexpectedly light, porous texture.

According to Turchin:

This artist has a special place in the checkered painting that is contemporary art. Every creation of Boris Kocheishvili presents at the very least if not the idea of cosmic creation then the objective meaning of reality. It seems that many of his pieces have ordinary themes such as rafters, lapta players (Russian ball game) and tea parties. Many of his works give an impression of an absolute peace and a perfect harmony. But I think this peace is not stable; it is the calm before the storm. The mood, rhythm, and structure of the compositions make you expect something else. All is calm, safe; the world so delicate and fragile, but a feeling of subconscious anxiety makes one worry that it can all come crashing down. The world of his creation evokes the desire to keep it protected.

For more than five decades Boris Kocheishvili has created a large oeuvre, many of his works are in the holdings of Russian and foreign museums, as well as in many private collections. For more than twenty years Boris Kocheishvili has resided and worked in a small wing on one of Arbat's many side streets. In his studio there are many works that have never been seen by the public. Kocheishvili has previously been married to Liya Akhedzhakova -famous Russian actress.

== Solo exhibitions ==
- 1991 Gallery "Today," Moscow
- 1995 CHA Exhibition, Moscow
- 1999 Exhibition of graphics "Coast," Gallery "New Collection," Moscow
- 2002 Exhibition of graphics, Gallery Le Vall, Novosibirsk
- 2004 "Reliefs and everything else," Zverev SRC Gallery, Moscow
- 2005 Black and white graphics, Zverev SRC Gallery, Moscow
- 2006 Dry fresco painting, Zverev SRC Gallery, Moscow
- 2007 "Reliefs of Georgia - relief Memoriam," Reliefs Club" Brest, Moscow
- 2007 Paintings, drawings, reliefs, Russian gallery, Tallinn, Estonia
- 2007 "Color and gold Boris Kocheishvili,” Exhibition Center, "New Manege," House of Anton Chekhov, Moscow
- 2007 Paintings, drawings, reliefs, Exhibition Hall, Institute of Art, Moscow
- 2008 "Legacy" painting, Exhibition Hall of "Our Heritage" Magazine, Moscow
- 2010 “Signs of attention,” Paintings, reliefs, and poetry, Gallery A3, Moscow
- 2010 Architectural drawings by Boris Kocheishvili, VKHUTEMAS Gallery, Moscow.
- 2011 “Persons and their reflections,” State Literary Museum, Moscow
- 2011 “Second birth,” Early graphic works, 2.36 Gallery, Moscow
- 2011 “On a bank,” PL Gallery, Moscow
- 2013 “Simple summer,” Russian Museum, St. Petersburg
- 2015 “Okoem,” Zdes Gallery, Moscow

== Selected group exhibitions ==
- 1963 Prints, Pushkin Museum, Moscow
- 1981 "Exhibition of 23," Central House of Artists, Moscow
- 1985 "Chicago International Art Fair," Chicago, IL
- 1988 "FIAC," Paris, France
- 1992 Together with O. Fradkin and M. Tukachevoy, Gallery "A lot," Salzburg, Austria
- 1998 Moskovskiye artists visiting the Chagall, Chagall Museum, Vitebsk, Belarus
- 2000 Gallery "New Collection" in the "Art-Brussels," Brussels, Belgium.
- 2008 "Diary of a space" graphic exhiobition. Together with N. Andrievich, V. Orlov and Yu Perevezentseva. Gallery G.O.S.T. in the exhibition hall, "Chekhov's Cottage," Moscow

== Publications ==
- Exhibition of works by Moscow artists. Paintings, drawings and sculpture. Catalogue. (MOSH RSFSR). Moscow 1981.
- New album charts. Album with illustrations. Publisher Soviet Artist "1991.
- Gallery of New Collection. Catalogue. 1998–2000.
- Second International Biennial of contemporary graphic art. Catalogue. Novosibirsk. 2001.
- Dominant 2007. Catalogue. Private collection of Andrew Pospelov and Alexander Mironov. 2007.
- Diary of a space. Exhibition Catalogue. (Gallery G.O.S.T.) Moscow. 2008.
- Drawings of the Russian Museum. Catalogue. 2008.
- Russian art of the second half of the twentieth century. From the Collection Foundation Sandretti. Catalogue. 2009.
- Boris Kocheishvili. Graphics. Paintings. Relief. Catalogue. Moscow. 2010.
- Passion build. Russische Kunst seit 1970. Die Sammlung Arina Kowner. Zurich. 2010.
- Boris Kocheishvili. Russian Museum. St. Petersburg. 2013.
