= List of Soviet films of 1968 =

A list of films produced in the Soviet Union in 1968 (see 1968 in film).

== 1968 ==
Title	Russian title	Director	Cast	Genre	Notes
1968
At War as at War	На войне как на войне	Viktor Tregubovich	Mikhail Kononov	War	
Dead Season	Мёртвый сезон	Savva Kulish	Donatas Banionis, Rolan Bykov, Gennadi Yukhtin	Spy film	
Degree of Risk	Степень риска	Ilya Averbakh	Boris Livanov	Drama	
Fire, Water, and Brass Pipes	Огонь, вода и… медные трубы	Aleksandr Rou	Natalya Sedykh, Aleksei Katyshev, Georgy Millyar, Vera Altayskaya	Fantasy	
The Diamond Arm	Бриллиантовая рука	Leonid Gaidai	Yuri Nikulin, Nina Grebeshkova, Andrei Mironov, Anatoli Papanov	Comedy, crime	
Goal! Another Goal!	Удар! Ещё удар!	Viktor Sadovsky	Viktor Korshunov	Comedy	
The Golden Calf	Золотой теленок	Mikhail Shveytser	Sergei Yursky, Leonid Kuravlyov, Zinovi Gerdt, Yevgeniy Yevstigneyev	Comedy, crime	
Intervention	Интервенция	Gennadi Poloka	Vladimir Vysotsky	Adventure	
Ivan Makarovich	Иван Макарович	Igor Dobrolyubov	Viktor Makhonin	Drama	
Jamilya	Джамиля	Sergei Yutkevich, Irina Poplavskaya	Natalya Arinbasarova	Drama	
A Literature Lesson	Урок литературы	Alexey Korenev	Yevgeny Steblov	Comedy	
A Little Crane	Журавушка	Nikolay Moskalenko	Lyudmila Chursina	Drama	
The Little Mermaid	Русалочка	Ivan Aksenchuk		Animated	
The Living Corpse	Живой труп	Vladimir Vengerov	Aleksey Batalov	Drama	
Love of Serafim Frolov	Любовь Серафима Фролова	Semyon Tumanov	Leonid Kuravlyov, Tamara Syomina, Larisa Luzhina, Gennadi Yukhtin	Romantic drama	
The Master of Taiga	Хозяин тайги	Vladimir Nazarov	Valeriy Zolotukhin	Crime	
Moabite Notebook	Моабитская тетрадь	Leonid Kvinikhidze	Rafkat Bikchentayev	Drama	
The Mysterious Monk	Таинственный монах	Arkadi Koltsaty	Vladimir Druzhnikov, Aleksandr Belyavskiy	Adventure	3D film
The New Adventures of the Elusive Avengers	Новые приключения Неуловимых	Edmond Keosayan	Viktor Kosykh, Boris Sichkin, Yefim Kopelyan, Armen Dzhigarkhanyan	Action	
No Path Through Fire	В огне брода нет	Gleb Panfilov	Inna Churikova, Anatoly Solonitsyn, Mikhail Gluzsky, Maya Bulgakova	War film	
An Old, Old Tale	Старая, старая сказка	Nadezhda Kosheverova	Oleg Dahl	Musical	
Once More About Love	Ещё раз про любовь	Georgy Natanson	Tatyana Doronina	Drama	
Passenger from the "Equator"	Пассажир с «Экватора»	Aleksandr Kurochkin	Jüri Krjukov	Adventure	
The Plea	Мольба	Tengiz Abuladze	Spartak Bagashvili, Rusudan Kiknadze, Ramaz Chkhikvadze	Drama	
Punisher	Каратель	Manos Zacharias	Yevgeny Kindinov	Drama	
The Secret Agent's Blunder	Ошибка резидента	Venyamin Dorman	Georgiy Zhzhonov	Spy	
Seven Old Men and a Girl	Семь стариков и одна девушка	Evgeniy Karelov	Svetlana Savyolova	Comedy	
The Shield and the Sword	Щит и меч	Vladimir Basov	Stanislav Lyubshin, Oleg Yankovsky, Georgy Martyniuk, Vladimir Basov	Spy film	
The Sixth of July	Шестое июля	Yuli Karasik	Alla Demidova	Drama	
The Snow Maiden	Снегурочка	Pavel Kadochnikov	Yevgenia Filonova	Fantasy	
Solaris	Солярис	Boris Nirenburg, Lidiya Ishimbayeva	Vasily Lanovoy, Vladimir Etush, Viktor Zozulin, Antonina Pilyus	Science fiction	
Three Days of Viktor Chernyshov	Три дня Виктора Чернышева	Mark Osepyan	Gennadi Korolkov	Drama	
To Love	Любить...	Mikhail Kalik, Inna Tumanyan	Mihail Badiceanu	Drama	
Transitional Age	Переходный возраст	Richard Viktorov	Elena Proklova	Drama	
Trembita	Трембита	Oleg Nikolayevsky	Evgeniy Vesnik	Comedy	
Two Comrades Were Serving	Служили два товарища	Yevgeni Karelov	Oleg Yankovsky, Rolan Bykov, Anatoli Papanov, Vladimir Vysotsky	War film	
We'll Live Till Monday	Доживём до понедельника	Stanislav Rostotsky	Vyacheslav Tikhonov, Irina Pechernikova, Nina Menshikova	Drama	Won the Golden Prize at Moscow
Unusual Exhibition	Необыкновенная выставка	Eldar Shengelaya	Guram Lordkipanidze, Valentina Telichkin, Vasili Chkhaidze	Comedy, drama	
Virineya	Виринея	Vladimir Fetin	Lyudmila Chursina	Drama	
Zigzag of Success	Зигзаг удачи	Eldar Ryazanov	Yevgeny Leonov, Irina Skobtseva, Valentina Talyzina, Yevgeniy Yevstigneyev	Comedy	
