= List of Soviet films of 1979 =

== 1979 ==
| Title | Original title | Director | Cast | Genre | Notes |
|---|---|---|---|---|---|
1979
| Adventures of Ali-Baba and the Forty Thieves | Приключения Али-Бабы и сорока разбойников | Latif Faiziyev, Umesh Mehra | Dharmendra, Hema Malini, Zeenat Aman, Prem Chopra, Madan Puri | Action, adventure, fantasy | Soviet-Indian co-production |
| Allegro Con Brio | Аллегро с огнём | Vladimir Strelkov | Vladimir Zamansky | War drama | |
| Aquanauts | Акванавты | Igor Vosnesensky | German Poloskov, Alexander Yakovlev | Science fiction | |
| Autumn Marathon | Осенний марафон | Georgi Daneliya | Oleg Basilashvili, Natalya Gundareva, Yevgeni Leonov, Marina Neyolova | Comedy, Drama, Romance | |
| Babek | Бабек | Eldar Guliyev | Rasim Balayev, Hasanagha Turabov | Biopic | |
| Babylon XX | Вавилон XX | Ivan Mykolaichuk | Ivan Mykolaichuk, Lyubov Polishchuk | Drama | |
| Bag of the Collector | Сумка инкассатора | Augusto Baltrušaitis | Georgi Burkov, Donatas Banionis, Elena Naumkina | Crime drama | |
| The Bodyguard | Телохранитель | Ali Khamraev | Alexander Kaidanovsky, Anatoly Solonitsyn | Eastern | |
| Border dog Alyi | Пограничный пёс Алый | Yuliy Fait | Vladimir Dubrovsky | Drama | |
| Dead Mountaineer's Hotel | Отель «У погибшего альпиниста» | Grigori Kromanov | Uldis Pūcītis, Jüri Järvet, Lembit Peterson, Mikk Mikiver | Science fiction | |
| Detective | Сыщик | Vladimir Fokin | Andrey Tashkov | Action | |
| Die Fledermaus | Летучая мышь | Yan Frid | Yury Solomin, Lyudmila Maksakova, Vitaly Solomin, Larisa Udovichenko | Operetta | |
| Fuss of the Fusses | Суета сует | Alla Surikova | Galina Polskikh | Comedy | |
| A Glass of Water | Стакан воды | Yuli Karasik | Kirill Lavrov, Alla Demidova, Natalia Belokhvostikova, Svetlana Smirnova | Comedy | |
| I Ask to Accuse Klava K. of My Death | В моей смерти прошу винить Клаву К. | Nikolai Lebedev, Ernest Yasan | Vladimir Shevelkov, Nadezhda Gorshkova, Natalia Zhuravleva | Drama | |
| Inquest of Pilot Pirx | Дознание пилота Пиркса | Marek Piestrak | Sergei Desnitsky, Aleksandr Kaidanovsky, Vladimir Ivashov | Science fiction | |
| Kind Men | Добряки | Karen Shakhnazarov | Georgy Burkov | Comedy | |
| Late Meeting | Поздняя встреча | Vladimir Shredel | Alexey Batalov, Larisa Luppian, Margarita Volodina, Tatyana Dogileva | Romantic Drama | |
| Life Is Beautiful | Жизнь прекрасна | Grigory Chukhray | Giancarlo Giannini, Ornella Muti, Stefano Madia, Enzo Fiermonte | Romantic Drama | Italian-Soviet co-production |
| Little Tragedies | Маленькие трагедии | Mikhail Shveytser | Matluba Alimova, Natalya Belokhvostikova, Nikolay Burlyaev | Drama | Adaptation of Alexander Pushkin works |
| The Meeting Place Cannot Be Changed | Место встречи изменить нельзя | Stanislav Govorukhin | Vladimir Vysotsky, Vladimir Konkin, Zinovy Gerdt, Armen Dzhigarkhanyan | Crime Drama | |
| Nameless Star | Безымянная звезда | Mikhail Kozakov | Anastasiya Vertinskaya, Igor Kostolevsky, Mikhail Kozakov | Romantic comedy | |
| The Nightingale | Соловей | Nadezhda Kosheverova | Svetlana Smirnova | Family | |
| An Ordinary Miracle | Обыкновенное чудо | Mark Zakharov | Oleg Yankovsky, Evgeni Leonov, Aleksandr Abdulov, Andrei Mironov, Irina Kupchenko, Yevgeniya Simonova | Romance, Fantasy, Musical | |
| Siberiade | Сибириада | Andrei Konchalovsky | Vladimir Samojlov, Natalya Andrejchenko, Vitaly Solomin, Nikita Mikhalkov | Drama | Won the Special Grand Jury Prize at the 1979 Cannes Film Festival |
| Stalker | Сталкер | Andrei Tarkovsky | Alexander Kaidanovsky, Anatoly Solonitsyn, Nikolai Grinko, Alisa Freindlich | Sci-fi, Drama | |
| Sherlock Holmes and Dr. Watson | Шерлок Холмс и доктор Ватсон | Igor Maslennikov | Vasily Livanov, Vitaly Solomin, Rina Zelyonaya | Crime | |
| A Taiga Story | Таёжная повесть | Vladimir Fetin | Yevgeny Kindinov | Drama | |
| Takeoff | Взлёт | Savva Kulish | Yevgeni Yevtushenko, Larisa Kadochnikova, Albert Filozov | Biopic | Entered into the 11th Moscow International Film Festival |
| Tailcoat for Scapegrace | Фрак для шалопая | Eldor Urazbayev | Mikhail Egorov, Viktor Ilyich | Romantic comedy | |
| Tale of Tales | Сказка сказок | Yuriy Norshteyn | Alexander Kalyagin | Animation | |
| The Theme | Тема | Gleb Panfilov | Mikhail Ulyanov, Inna Churikova, Stanislav Lyubshin, Yevgeni Vesnik | Romance, Comedy, Drama | |
| Three Men in a Boat | Трое в лодке, не считая собаки | Naum Birman | Andrei Mironov, Alexander Schirvindt, Mikhail Derzhavin | Musical comedy | |
| Very Blue Beard | Очень синяя борода | Vladimir Samsonov | Mikhail Boyarskiy, Oleg Anofriev | Animation | |
| The Very Same Munchhausen | Тот самый Мюнхгаузен | Mark Zakharov | Oleg Yankovskiy, Inna Churikova, Yelena Koreneva, Igor Kvasha | Comedy | |
| When I Will Become a Giant | Когда я стану великаном | Inna Tumanyan | Mikhail Yefremov, Liya Akhedzhakova, Inna Ulyanova | Comedy-drama | |
| The Wife Has Left | Жена ушла | Dinara Asanova | Valery Priyomykhov | Drama | |
