= Aleksei Smirnov (actor) =

Soviet actor (1920–1979)

- Алексей Смирнов
- Smirnov in the 1970s
- Born: 28 February 1920; Danilov, Yaroslavl Oblast, Russian SFSR
- Died: 7 May 1979 (aged 59); Leningrad, Soviet Union
- Resting place: Yuzhnoye Cemetery, Leningrad
- Years active: 1959–1977
- Awards: Order of the Red Star; Order of Glory, 2nd class Medal "For Courage"; Medal for Battle Merit

Aleksei Makarovich Smirnov (Russian: Алексей Макарович Смирнов; 28 February 1920 – 7 May 1979) was a Soviet and Russian theater and film actor. He performed in more than fifty films between 1959 and 1977 and was a Merited Artist of the Russian Federation.

== Early life ==
Aleksei Smirnov was born on 28 February 1920, in the town of Danilov, Yaroslavl Oblast, to the Smirnov family: Makar Stepanovich Smirnov and Anna Ivanovna. In the mid-1920s they moved to Leningrad. After her husband's early death Anna Ivanovna had to raise her two children on her own – Aleksei had a younger brother Arkady. The Smirnovs resided in a communal apartment at 44 Petr Lavrov str. As a pupil, Aleksei Smirnov began acting in the school amateur theatre. In 1940 he graduated from the Leningrad Music Comedy Theater school and was admitted into the troupe. Smirnov only acted in one part there – Black Eagle in the operetta Rose-Marie – before the Great Patriotic War began.

== The Great Patriotic War ==
In 1941 he left for the front as a volunteer. He was a chemical instructor, then squad leader in the 3rd Artillery Battery, 169th Red Banner mortar regiment, 3rd Red Banner and Order of Lenin artillery division of Zhitomir. Aleksei Smirnov took part in the battles at the Western, Bryansk, 1st Ukrainian and 2nd Byelorussian Fronts, many times was sent for scouting behind the enemy lines. One of his award papers says he killed three fascists with his assault rifle. In the front line he once acted instead of his commander (which was down) and dispersed about two enemy squads by intensive mortar fire. When breaking through the enemy positions near the village of Onatskovsi on 4 March 1944 Smirnov and his squad eliminated a mortar battery, a turret machine-gun and about 30 enemy soldiers, which let them regain the village and further take possession of the town of Starokonstantinov on 9 March. In that action staff-sergeant Smirnov with his squad have destroyed 2 turret machine-guns, a 75-mm cannon and 35 enemy infantrymen. For his courage Aleksei Smirnov was nominated for the 1st class of the Order of the Patriotic War, but was instead awarded the lower grade Order of the Red Star.

On 20 July 1944 height 283.0 was assaulted by 40 German soldiers. Smirnov rushed into action inspiring his comrades and therefore defeated the attack. In that engagement 17 Germans were killed and 7 taken prisoners solely by Smirnov. A week after, Smirnov and his three fellow-soldiers were scouting for new fire positions and encountered 16 enemy soldiers who tried to capture them. But they encountered active opposition. Nine of them were killed and five taken prisoners by the Soviet soldiers. For that action Smirnov was awarded the 3rd class of the Order of Glory.

During the Vistula–Oder offensive on 17 January 1945, Smirnov's battery was ambushed near the village of Postashevitze. Smirnov with three fellow soldiers attacked the enemy. Aleksei Makarovich shot down three and captured two enemy soldiers and the way ahead was free. On 22 January, when the Soviet Army was crossing the Oder, Smirnov with his mortar squad ferried the river on their own and demolished two turret machine-guns and 20 enemy soldiers. The 36th Regiment therefore managed to gain and expand the bridgehead near the village of Eichenrid, and Smirnov was awarded the 2nd class of the Order of Glory.

Showing great valour in the battlefield, Smirnov also led the regiment's amateur theatre. In May, June and July 1944 he organized 10 performances attended by total of 6500 soldiers. Smirnov's theatre took part in the division's contests in 1943 and 1944 and won the first prize. Within that period Aleksei Smirnov was awarded the Medal "For Battle Merit".

Starshina Smirnov was unable to be present at the Battle of Berlin. He received a concussion in one of his battles and, after stationary treatment, was demobilized.

== Acting in theater and film ==
In 1946 Aleksei Smirnov was accepted to St. Peterburg Music Comedy Theatre. He was not famous and rather poor. With no work in cinema and minor parts in theatre, Aleksei, however, had to look after his sick mother who got mental disorder after her younger son Arkady had been killed at war. Not able to follow his troupe in the road-tours Aleksei Smirnov had to leave the theatre in 1952 and work in Lengosestrada. Some time later his massive bodily constitution and guileless appearance brought him to the fore and he soon was suggested a number of supporting parts in comedies. The theatric audience liked Smirnov's funny clumsy characters; especially he was favored by young public. Within early 50s Smirnov had embodied a number of noticeable parts in the Theatre of Music Comedy including those in the Wind of Freedom and Maids' Hustle. Aleksei Makarovich got, however, bored with comedy roles as he'd always been dreaming of dramatic parts. His first semi-dramatic part was Peter the Great in the play Tobacco Captain by Nikolay Aduyev.

By the end of 50s Smirnov became famous among movie-makers. In 1959 he was invited by Yuri Ozerov to appear in his film Kochubei. The actor played the only comic role in a serious movie, which was followed by six more invitations. Smirnov agreed to one of the parts in the film Roman and Franceska, shot at the Dovzhenko Film Studios, just to visit Kiev and see the way it had been rebuilt after the war.

In 1961, when Aleksei Smirnov worked at Lenfilm, two films with his participation in a row came out: comedy Striped Trip by Vladimir Fetin and film adaptation of Nikolai Gogol's The Night Before Christmas. Both were enjoyed by the public.

But what brought national fame to the actor were his works in Leonid Gaidai's films – Operation Y and Shurik's Other Adventures and Strictly Business.

== Death ==
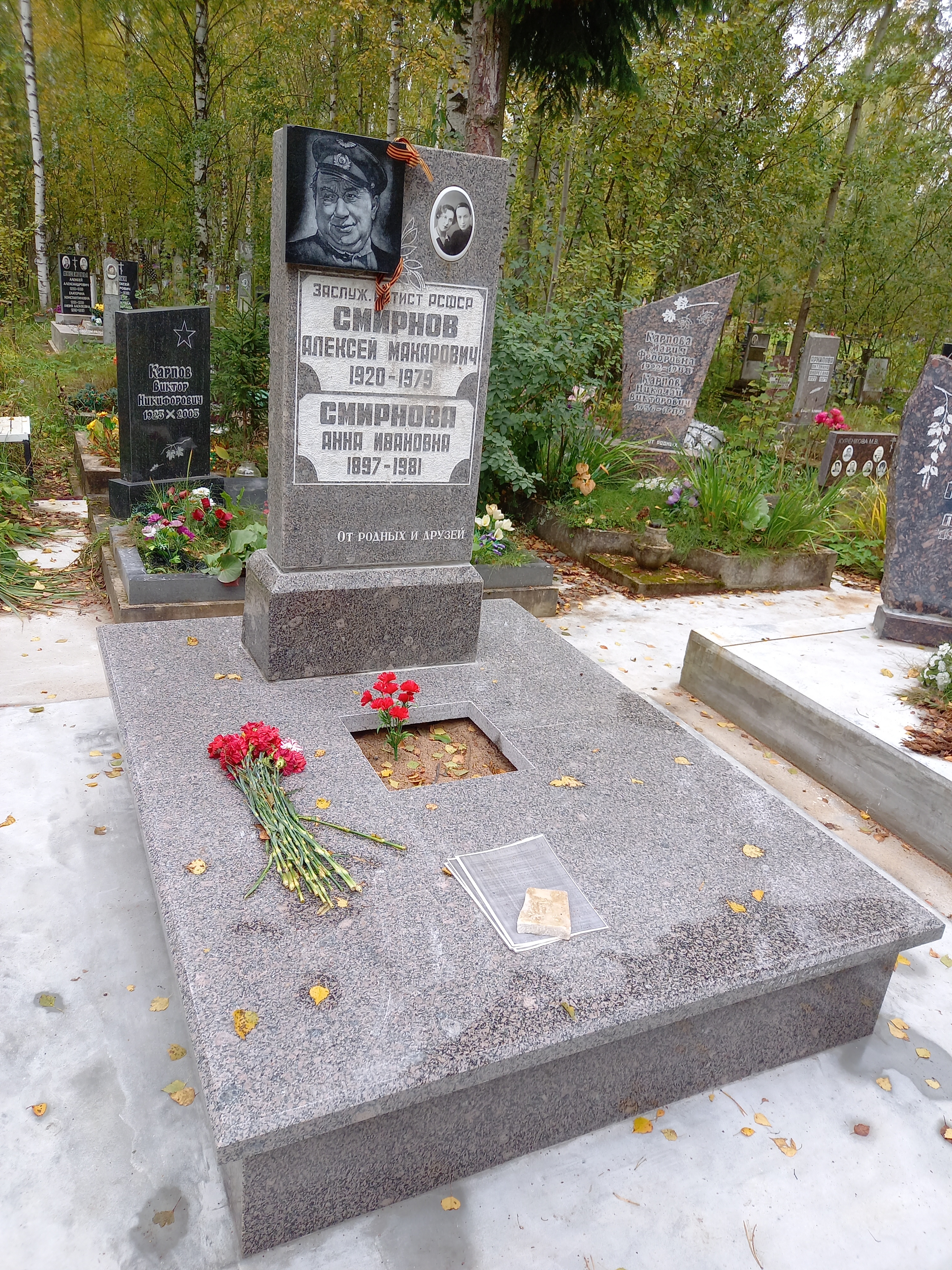
Smirnov's grave in St. Petersburg

Smirnov died in Leningrad on 7 May 1979 at the age of 59.

== Selected filmography ==
Film
Year	Title	Role	Notes
1960	Resurrection	episode	
1961	The Night Before Christmas	ambassador	
1961	Striped Trip	sailor Knysh	
1962	Strictly Business	Bill Driscoll	
1964	Don Tale	cook	
1964	Welcome, or No Trespassing	house-keeper	
1965	Operation Y and Other Shurik's Adventures	Fedya / buyer on the market	
1966	Aybolit-66	Pirate	
1967	Wedding in Malinovka	bandit Smetana	
1968	Fire, Water, and Brass Pipes	fire chief	
1968	Seven Old Men and a Girl	Maslennikov	
1969	The Adjutant of His Excellency	crook	
1972	Chipollino	Cipollone	
1973	Only Old Men Are Going to Battle	Makarych	
1975	Finist, the brave Falcon	attendant	

== Memory ==
- In 2011, a monument to the mechanic Makarych (Smirnov's character in "Only "Old Men" Are Going Into Battle") was unveiled in Kharkiv.
- On 6 May 2018, a monument to Alexei Smirnov in the image of a mechanic Makarych was unveiled at the Levtsovo airfield in the Yaroslavl region.
- In 2020, a memorial plaque with the image of Alexey Smirnov in the image of the mechanic Makarych and the phrase "Let's live" was installed at the Lenfilm film studio.
