= Resident Return =

- Russian: Возвращение резидента
- Directed by: Venyamin Dorman
- Written by: Oleg Shmelyov; Vladimir Vostokov
- Starring: Georgiy Zhzhonov; Pyotr Velyaminov; Leonid Bronevoy; Boris Khimichev; Iren Azer
- Cinematography: Vadim Kornilyev
- Music by: Mikael Tariverdiev
- Release date: 1982
- Running time: 137 minute
- Country: Soviet Union
- Language: Russian

Resident Return (Russian: Возвращение резидента), also known as Resident Is Back, is a 1982 Soviet thriller film directed by Venyamin Dorman.

It is the third of four films based around the same character, the spy Mikhail Tulyev, played by Georgy Zhzhyonov. The first one, The Secret Agent's Blunder (Resident's Mistake) was made in 1968, with Secret Agent's Destiny (Resident's Way) following in 1970. End of the Resident Project (Konets operatsii Rezident) was released in 1986. The film is a continuation of the films “The Secret Agent's Blunder” and Secret Agent's Destiny. Mikhail Tulyev prevents the sabotage action of Western intelligence agencies.

== Plot ==
After returning from the USSR, Tulyev is subjected to intense scrutiny by his former "handlers." He resumes his work in Western intelligence but is now operating as a Soviet spy for the First Chief Directorate of the KGB. In this new role, he locates Nazi war criminal Hofmann, once sentenced to death, and aids in his arrest. However, due to internal conflict within NATO intelligence, he becomes a target for Charlie Brighton, Hofmann's henchman. Meanwhile, Tulyev discovers the identity of his father's murderer — Karl Brockman, a mercenary whom he encountered while on assignment in a foreign, hot country. Though driven to seek revenge, Tulyev ironically finds himself tasked with preparing Brockman for a covert infiltration mission into the Soviet Union.

== Cast ==
- Georgiy Zhzhonov as Mikhail Tulyev
- Pyotr Velyaminov as Lukin
- Leonid Bronevoy as Staube
- Boris Khimichev as Robert Stivenson
- Iren Azer as Marta
- Yevgeny Kindinov as Brockman
- Vadim Zakharchenko as Utkin
- Nikolai Prokopovich as Markov
- Lyubov Sokolova as Natalya Sergeyevna
- Nikolay Grabbe as Krug
