= Manos Zacharias =

Greek film director and writer (born 1922)

- Μάνος Ζαχαρίας
- Born: Emmanuel Zacharias; 9 July 1922 (age 104); Thiseio, Athens, Kingdom of Greece
- Citizenship: Greece
- Education: National and Kapodistrian University of Athens; Institut des hautes études cinématographiques
- Occupations: Film director; screenwriter; actor; author
- Years active: 1948–2012
- Employers: Mosfilm (1949–1979); Ministry of Culture (1982–1989); Greek Film Centre (1986–1989); Hellenic Broadcasting Corporation (1994–2012)
- Known for: President of Greek Film Centre
- Notable work: Also People (1959); I'm a Soldier Mom (1966); Punisher (1968); City of First Love (1970)
- Spouse: Liolia
- Children: 2
- Relatives: Mariella Fasoula (granddaughter)

Emmanuel "Manos" Zacharias (Greek: Εμμανουήλ «Μάνος» Ζαχαρίας; born 9 July 1922) is a Greek film director, writer, and actor. He was active in Greek and Soviet cinema.

== Life and career ==
Zacharias was born on 9 July 1922, in the Thiseio neighbourhood of Athens. His father was a chemist and his mother was a teacher. He studied at the National and Kapodistrian University of Athens in the chemistry department and during 1941 and 1944 he was a member of EPON.

In 1945, with a scholarship from the French Institute, he left for studies in Paris on the ship "Mataroa" together with other young people who later excelled Kostas Axelos, Memos Makris etc. He studied cinema at IDHEK and attended theater courses. In 1956, after a competition, he studied at the Mosfilm school in Moscow. With the end of his studies he worked as a director at Mosfilm. In 1971 he took over the artistic direction of Mosfilm's Third Studio. As a director he made seven feature films and three short films. In 1979 he returned to Greece and from 1981 took over the field of cinema at the Ministry of Culture until 1990.

Zacharias married his wife, Liolia, when he returned to Greece and they have two daughters, Eleni, called "Lena" (b. 1958) and Maria, called "Masha" (b. 1966).

He turned 100 on 9 July 2022.

== Tribute ==
In 2004, the 45th Thessaloniki Film Festival screened Zacharias' film One of the Execution Squad (1968) as part of the tribute A Director Passionate about Greece.

In 2008, the 49th Thessaloniki Film Festival paid tribute to Manos Zacharias under the title The traveler of memory, in the context of which Zacharias' films The Truth for the Children of Greece (1948), Morning Route (1959), The Mops (1960) were screened ), Night Passenger (1962), End and Beginning (1963), I'm a Soldier, Mom (1966), One of the Firing Squad (1968), City of First Love (1970), Corner of Arbat and Bouboulinas (1972), Alias Lukacs (1977) as well as the documentary The Story of My Years - Manos Zacharias (2005) by Stelios Charalambopoulos.

== Selected filmography ==
Director

- I'm a Soldier Mom (1966)
- Punisher (1968)
- City of First Love (1970)

Actor

- Also People (1959) as French officer
- Punisher (1968) as priest (voiced by Yuri Gorobets)
