= Sweet Woman =

- Directed by: Vladimir Fetin
- Written by: Irina Velembovskaya
- Starring: Natalya Gundareva; Oleg Yankovsky; Pyotr Velyaminov; Rimma Markova; Nina Alisova
- Cinematography: Semyon Ivanov; Vladimir Kovzel
- Music by: Vasily Solovyov-Sedoi
- Distributed by: Lenfilm
- Release date: 23 May 1977
- Running time: 98 minutes
- Country: USSR
- Language: Russian

Sweet Woman (Russian: Сладкая женщина, romanized: Sladkaya zhenshchina) is a 1977 Soviet drama film directed by Vladimir Fetin after the novel by Irina Velembovskaya.

== Plot ==
Anna Dobrokhotova was born and raised in a village. Life in the village is constant, hard and exhausting work, but unlike other hard-working villagers, Anna is lazy and disorganized. Sunbathing, lying on a feather bed, and eating something delicious – this is the farthest her girlish aspirations transpire. A random affair with a young student leads into Anna's pregnancy and birth of a child, but these relations do not develop further because Anna does not wish to get married presently.

Anna moves to a city and goes to work at a confectionery factory. Anna's income improves, but this does not change her views on life – she is still lazy, indifferent to the surrounding world and people, and does not strive to further expand her horizons. Anna becomes a classical example of the petty bourgeois; a self-centered woman whose whole existence is reduced to the purpose of accumulating material wealth and the creation of personal comfort.

During a visit to her female friend, Anna meets Nikolai Egorovich Kushakov, a lonely disabled war veteran. Their love affair turns into a full-fledged marriage, and at first it seems to Anna that her personal life is finally put in order. Private flat, furniture, fridge – all these symbols of an "affluent" life are obtained by Nikolai Egorovich which pleases Anna very much. But the seemingly happy marriage falls apart; Kushakov leaves the family, because living together with a narcissistic philistine becomes unbearable for him. Her son, Yuri, fully supports his stepfather in the conflict and also leaves the house and goes to the Nakhimov Naval School. Soon in the village her old mother dies, and Anna is left completely alone.

While walking in the forest, Anna meets Tikhon Sokolov, a simple construction worker who operates a crane. He's divorced, and at first Tikhon is under the impression that Anna is the new great love in his life. Anna, itching to find a husband, seizes Tikhon into a "stranglehold" and behaves in an extremely indecent and tiresome way. Relationship between Tikhon and Anna seems to be developing, but... As Tikhon gets closer acquainted with Anna, he understands that this simple-minded and selfish woman does not arouse anything in him except for feelings of disgust, and so without hesitating, he throws out Anna from his home and out of his life. And so again, the "sweet woman" Anna, beautiful and wealthy, is in the state of tragic loneliness that she herself has been creating all these years.

== Cast ==
- Natalya Gundareva as Anna Aleksandrovna Dobrokhotova
- Svetlana Karpinskaya as Lidiya Nikolaevna Dyadkina, Anna's friend
- Pyotr Velyaminov as Nikolai Egorovich Kushakov, Anna's husband
- Oleg Yankovsky as Tikhon Dmitrievich Sokolov, Anna's boyfriend
- Rimma Markova as Anna's mother
- Georgy Korolchuk as Larik Shubkin, Anna's first boyfriend, the father of her son
- Nina Alisova as Raisa Ivanovna Shubkina, Larik's mother
- Fyodor Nikitin as Shubkin, Larik's father

== Filming ==
- The producer Vladimir Fetin confirmed his wife Lyudmila Chursina for the role of the main heroine; he devised the film with her in mind. But Chursina soon refused to participate in this project.
- For the role of Tikhon, Vladimir Vysotsky was first invited, he triumphantly passed the test, but then declined due to conflicting and busy schedule in the theater.
