= Striped Trip =

- Directed by: Vladimir Fetin
- Written by: Viktor Viktorovich Konetskiy; Aleksei Kapler
- Starring: Alexey Gribov; Ivan Dmitriyev; Margarita Nazarova; Yevgeny Leonov; Vladimir Belokurov
- Cinematography: Dmitry Meskhiev
- Music by: Veniamin Basner
- Distributed by: Lenfilm
- Release date: 8 September 1961
- Running time: 83 minutes
- Country: USSR
- Language: Russian

Striped Trip (Russian: Полосатый рейс, romanized: Polosatyi reys) is a 1961 Soviet adventure comedy film directed by Vladimir Fetin, with the acclaimed tiger tamer Margarita Nazarova in the main role. The movie was seen by 45.8 mil. viewers on the year of release, becoming the Soviet box office leader.

To escape from a hot tropical place Shuleykin (Yevgeny Leonov) accepts a position on a ship looking after a cargo of twelve cages with tigers. Chief mate ("starpom" in Russian), played by Ivan Dmitriyev) has continuous arguments with Marianna (Margarita Nazarova) about the little tricks she plays on the crew. One day a stowaway monkey opens the cages and the limited capabilities of Shuleykin get exposed. In this situation Marianna unexpectedly turns into a skilled animal trainer.

== Plot ==
The story begins in the lobby of an Odessa circus, where Shuleikin, a buffet worker, is greeted by the crew of a ship who jokingly call him a "tamer" and gift him a statue of the deity Hotei. Intrigued, a waitress asks him to recount the tale behind the nickname. Shuleikin narrates how, in July 1956, he was a cook at a Soviet trade mission who desperately wanted to return home from a tropical port. The only way to do so was to impersonate a wild animal trainer, as the Soviet freighter Eugene Onegin needed someone to accompany ten tigers and two lions being transported to the Odessa Zoo. Under pressure, Shuleikin agreed to the pretense, though the crew was unaware of his ruse. Meanwhile, the company supplying the animals also gifted a chimpanzee as a bonus, which escaped its sack onboard, triggering a series of chaotic events. Personal belongings went missing, soup was mysteriously sabotaged with bolts and nuts, and suspicion fell on Marianne, the captain’s mischievous niece. Despite the captain’s attempts to maintain order, tensions rose within the crew.

As the voyage continued, Marianne staged pranks to attract the attention of the strict first mate, Oleg Petrovich, including faking tiger footprints. However, her antics only led to her arrest and kitchen duties as punishment. Meanwhile, the escaped chimpanzee inadvertently freed the tigers and lions from their cages during a lively tap-dancing session on the ship’s deck. The sudden release of the predators caused widespread panic among the crew, who armed themselves with whatever tools they could find. The ship fell into disarray, with the animals roaming freely, raiding food stores, and terrifying the sailors. An attempt to call for external help ended in failure, as a visiting animal trainer, Chokoladi, fled in fear after realizing the animals were undomesticated. Amid the chaos, Shuleikin, exposed as a fraud, sought refuge in an empty cage, while Marianne courageously stepped in to calm the beasts, ultimately falling overboard in the process.

As the ship neared Odessa, Marianne and the tigers swam ashore, startling local beachgoers. Returning triumphantly to the ship, she managed to round up the animals, restoring order just in time for the vessel’s arrival. The voyage concluded with Oleg Petrovich being reinstated as captain and leaving the ship with the mischievous chimpanzee dressed in a sailor’s uniform. Back at the circus, Shuleikin ends his tale just as a tiger fight breaks out. He and the waitress witness Marianne, now a veterinarian and married to Oleg Petrovich, taking charge of the injured tiger and transporting it through the city for medical care, leaving astonished onlookers in her wake.

== Cast ==
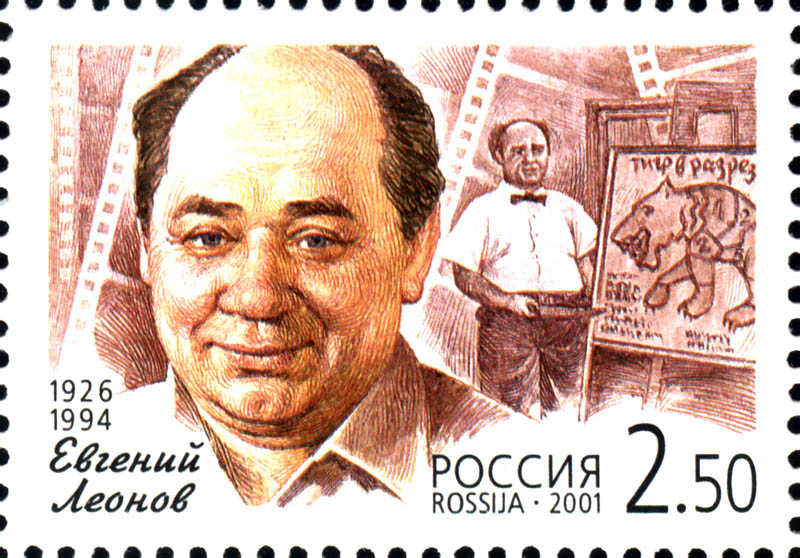
Postage stamp devoted to Leonov and episode of Soviet movie Striped Trip.

- Alexey Gribov as Vasily Vasilyevich, captain
- Ivan Dmitriyev as Oleg Petrovich, chief mate
- Margarita Nazarova as Marianna Andreevna, barmaid (voiced by Galina Korotkevich)
- Yevgeny Leonov as Gleb Savelievich Shuleykin, cook, who was forced to impersonate a tiger tamer
- Vladimir Belokurov as Alexey Stepanovich, boatswain
- Nikolai Volkov as agent (voiced by Yefim Kopelyan)
- Aleksandr Benyaminov as Chocoladi, Indian tamer
- Arkadi Trusov as cook
- Vyacheslav Sirin as Motya, sailor, who can famously beat tap dancing
- Aleksei Smirnov as Valya Knysh, sailor on watch
- Alexey Kozhevnikov as radioman
- Alexander Susnin as Sidorenko, sailor
- Nikolay Trofimov as navigator
- Alisa Freindlich as Shuleykin's assistant in the circus buffet
- Vasily Lanovoy as vacationer on the beach
- Yuri Gorobets as militiaman

== Production ==
=== Concept ===
The idea of a movie with Margarita Nazarova in the lead originated during the 1959 official visit of the Emperor of Ethiopia Haile Selassie to Moscow: Nikita Khrushchev invited him to a circus performance during which Nazarova brought several tiger cubs to the lodge and received high praise from Khrushchev who wondered why hadn't she been cast in a movie yet.

This motivated all studio executives to start a search for an appropriate screenplay which ended as soon as Viktor Konetsky, a former sailor and a beginning writer, shared his life story with the Lenfilm director, how a bear once escaped from a cage during a sea voyage. The idea of animals running around the ship appealed to Nazarova and her husband and circus partner Konstantin Konstantinovsky who was also suggested the work of a tamer and a stuntman. A young, but promising film director Vladimir Fetin took the job, while Konetsky was "strengthen" by a seasoned screenwriter Aleksei Kapler.

=== Shooting ===
All ten tigers from the circus troupe became involved, including Pursh who had already starred in a similar-themed comedy movie Tamer of Tigers and who ended up performing most of the complex scenes. Another addition was a lion Vaska from the Leningrad Zoo who had also made an appearance in Lenfilm's movies such as Don Quixote (1957), She Loves You (1956) and New Adventures of Puss in the Boots (1958), although the tigers didn't get along with him and most of his scenes were shot separately. Lastly, a chimpanzee named Pirate was borrowed from the Kyiv Zoo along with his bride, a monkey Chilita since he refused to leave or act without her.

The animals went through two months of training on the Matros Zhelezniak cargo ship in Leningrad, while the actual movie was shot in the Black Sea on board of the Fryazino motor vessel. Konstantin Konstantinovsky worked as a stunt double on a number of occasions, most famously during the scene where Oleg Petrovich (played by Ivan Dmitriyev) fights a tiger (revealed during the ending credits). Many other stunts were performed by a fellow tamer Arkady Rudin. The only actor who not only refused to use a stunt double, but also came up with a number of dangerous stunts of his own was Aleksei Smirnov: in one scene he even appears holding tight onto a tiger's tail. In fact Smirnov spent a whole month feeding animals and gaining their trust.

A 23-minute movie Attention, Tigers! which documented the filming process was shot by the main cinematographer Dmitry Meskhiev and released the same year by the Soviet Central Television.

=== Myths ===
The movie production is surrounded by a number of myths which originated with time. Among them is the one concerning the scene showing Shuleykin (played by Yevgeny Leonov) taking a bath when a tiger (Pursh) quietly enters the cabin. As the legend goes, Leonov refused to perform until he was convinced they would be separated by a special glass; yet the glass was blinking and the director secretly ordered to remove it while the actor's face was covered with foam, so when the tiger touched Leonov he acted naturally and ran away in fear, completely naked. Yet the second unit cinematographer Dmitry Dolinin denied the whole story, saying there was no talk of the glass at all, Leonov was aware of the tiger's presence and acted according to the script despite being really scared.

Another popular myth was voiced in the book Striped Trip (2003) by some Maksim Mogilevsky. According to him the lion Vaska was killed on director's order, because he refused to take sleeping pills, it was the last shooting day and Fetin desperately needed a scene with the ship's crew carrying a sleeping lion, so one pyrotechnician "drank a glass of vodka" and shot him through the ear. This myth was dispelled in 2010 by Mikhail Kozlov, a leading research fellow of the Zoological Institute of the Russian Academy of Sciences and an occasional journalist who dedicated an article to the famous lions of St. Petersburg, calling Vaska a local celebrity. He mentioned how "several decades later scary stories appeared out of nowhere" surrounding the lion's death despite Vaska safely returned home and lived many years after.

Same book also wrongly states that Vaska belonged to the Odessa Zoo and contains other factual errors that were later exaggerated by journalists. Among them is yet another anecdote about one of the tigers who managed to escape the shooting zone in Odessa to the nearby Arcadia Beach full of people and basically repeated the original scenario, causing panic, but was stopped by some heroic lighting technician who hit the tiger with a glove on the nose and made him retreat. According to the documentary by Aleksei Vasiliev the tiger indeed escaped to the nearby territory (not the beach), but was quickly caught and returned by Nazarova herself.
