= Sedoy =

Sedoy or Sedoi (feminine: Sedaya) is a Russian surname literally meaning "grey-haired". Notable people with the surname include:

- Igor Sedoy, Belarusian wrestler
- Vasily Solovyov-Sedoy, Soviet composer and songwriter
- Mikhail Litvin-Sedoy (1917–1996), Russian and Soviet mechanical engineer and scientist
