= Ivan Makarovich =

- Иван Макарович
- Directed by: Igor Dobrolyubov
- Written by: Valery Savchenko
- Starring: Viktor Makhonin
- Cinematography: Dmitry Zaitsev
- Music by: Rafail Khozak
- Production company: Belarusfilm
- Release date: 1968
- Running time: 85 minutes
- Country: Soviet Union
- Languages: Russian, Belarusian

Ivan Makarovich (Russian: Иван Макарович) is a 1968 Soviet drama film directed by Igor Dobrolyubov. The film was shot in Grodno, Vilnius, Minsk, and Vladimir.

== Plot ==
At the outbreak of the Great Patriotic War, a 13-year-old boy named Ivan loses his family: his father leaves for the front, and his mother is killed in a bombing. Forced to survive on his own, Ivan is evacuated beyond the Urals, finds work at a factory, and manages to help others despite his circumstances.

== Cast ==
- Viktor Makhonin as Ivan Makarovich
- Lyudmila Kochka as Lyalka
- Irina Brazgovka as Zina
- Mikhail Makarov as Kolya
- Tamara Loginova as Maria Stepanovna, Ivan's mother
- Yelena Maksimova as grandmother
- Valentina Vladimirova as Kolya's mother
- Arkady Trusov as Uncle Kuzya
- Nikolai Yeremenko Sr. as father
- Zinaida Vorkul as postwoman
- Galina Rogachyova as teacher
- Igor Pushkaryov as a wounded soldier on a hospital train
- Boris Rudnev as a guard soldier on a hospital train
- Vladimir Marenkov as a disabled soldier on a hospital train
- Boris Gitin as a wounded soldier on a hospital train
- Mikhail Fedorovsky as doctor

== Production ==
According to contemporary local press reports, the film was shot in several cities, including Grodno, Vilnius, Minsk, and Vladimir. Director Igor Dobrolyubov noted that Vladimir was selected in part for its winter landscapes, which were considered suitable for depicting wartime settings in the Urals. Certain facilities of the Vladimir Tractor Plant were used as filming locations to represent industrial sites featured in the story.

Dobrolyubov also recalled that the casting of the lead role proved challenging, with many candidates considered before Viktor Makhonin was selected following a casting call held in Odesa. The production relied heavily on location shooting, which required the crew to move between different cities during filming.

At the time of production, Ivan Makarovich was Dobrolyubov's second feature film.

== Awards ==
- 1970 — Grand Prix "Silver Minerva" at the 22nd International Children's Film Festival in Venice, Italy
- 1970 — First Prize at the 4th All-Union Film Festival in Minsk in the category of films for children and youth
