= Virineya =

- Russian: Виринея
- Directed by: Vladimir Fetin
- Written by: Lidiya Seyfullina; Albina Shulgina
- Produced by: Joseph Shurukht
- Starring: Lyudmila Chursina; Vyacheslav Nevinny; Anatoliy Papanov; Valentina Vladimirova; Oleg Borisov
- Cinematography: Yevgeni Shapiro
- Edited by: Raisa Isakson
- Music by: Vasily Solovyov-Sedoi
- Production company: Lenfilm
- Release date: 1968
- Running time: 108 min.
- Country: Soviet Union
- Language: Russian

Virineya (Russian: Виринея) is a 1968 Soviet drama film directed by Vladimir Fetin.

== Plot ==
Civil War. Virineya is a despised creature in the remote village of Nebesnovka. Clever, beautiful, desperate head, she herself, out of a sense of contradiction, multiplies her notoriety. The acute social and everyday drama tells how the unlucky Virka found her way to personal happiness, participation in a new life, to feat.

== Cast ==
- Lyudmila Chursina as Virineya
- Vyacheslav Nevinny as Pavel Sluzov
- Anatoliy Papanov as Maraga
- Valentina Vladimirova as Anisya
- Oleg Borisov as Vasily
- Stanislav Chekan as Zhiganov
- Yevgeny Leonov as Mikhailo
- Vyacheslav Shalevich as Ivan Pavlovich, engineer
- Alexey Gribov as investigator
- Vyacheslav Sirin as Frantz
- Irina Gubanova as librarian Antonina Nikolaevna
