= Mikhail Nozhkin =

Russian actor and poet (1937–2026)

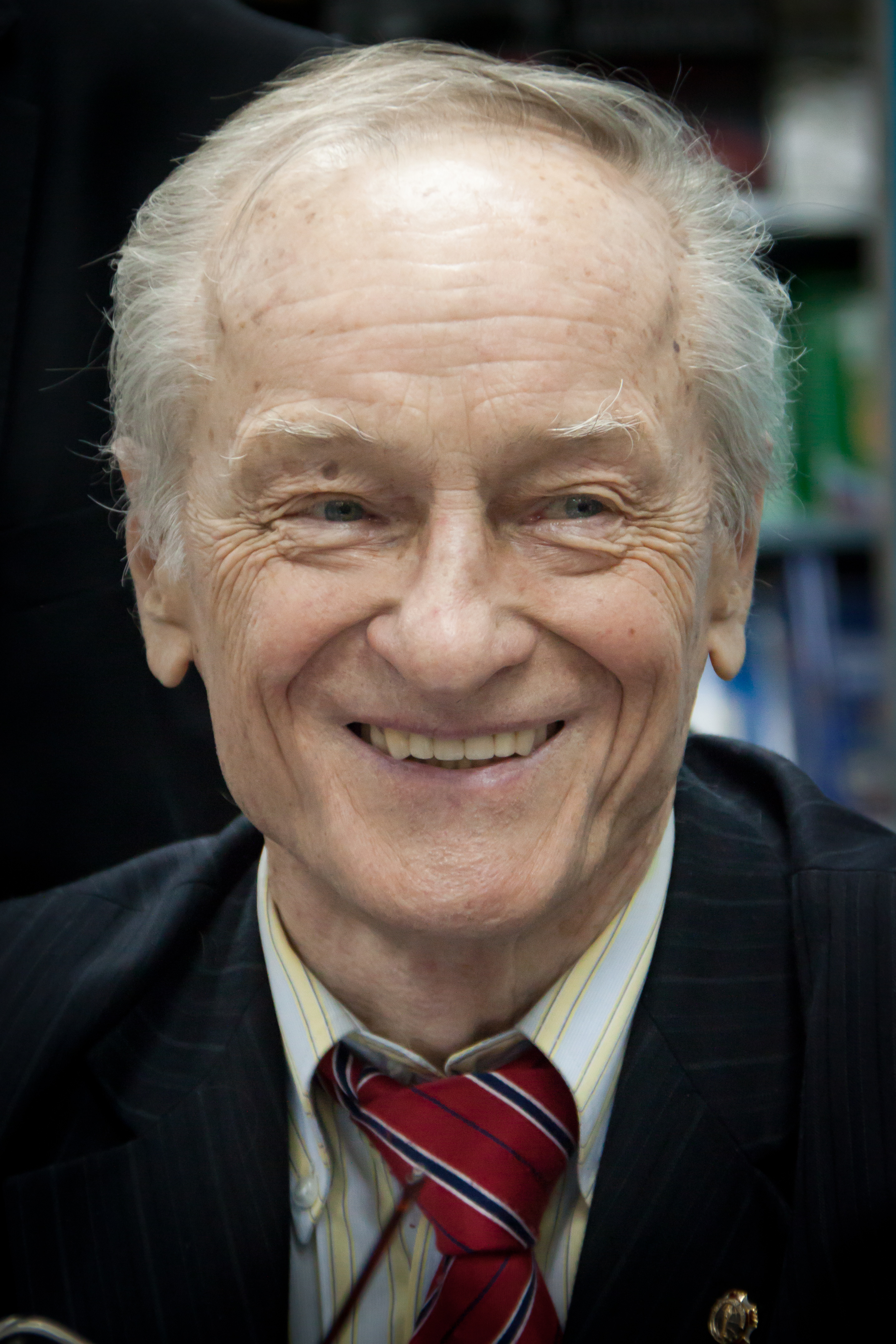
Nozhkin in 2012

Mikhail Ivanovich Nozhkin (Russian: Михаил Иванович Ножкин; January 19, 1937 – June 22, 2026) was a Soviet and Russian film and theatre actor, poet and musician. Nozhkin was born on January 19, 1937. He was made a People's Artist of the RSFSR in 1980. Nozhkin died on June 22, 2026, at the age of 89.

== Partial filmography ==
- Two Hours Earlier (1967) as Trainer
- The Secret Agent's Blunder (1968) as Pavel Sinitsyn
- By the Lake (1969) as Gennady Yakovlev
- Secret Agent's Destiny (1970) as Pavel Sinitsyn
- Liberation (Film IV & Film V) (1971) as Yartsev
- The Youth of Peter the Great (1980) as Knyaz Boris Alekseyevich Golitsyn
- At the Beginning of Glorious Days (1980) as Knyaz Boris Alekseyevich Golitsyn
- The Detached Mission (1985) as Shatokhin
