= Tamer of Tigers =

- Edited by: Aleksandr Ivanovsky
- Production company: Lenfilm
- Release date: 1955
- Country: Soviet Union
- Language: Russian

Tamer of Tigers (released in English as Tiger Girl, Russian: Укротительница тигров, romanized: Ukrotitelnitsa tigrov) is a 1955 Soviet-era comedy film released by Lenfilm, directed by Nadezhda Kosheverova and Aleksandr Ivanovsky. It was billed as a "lyrical and eccentric comedy". This film was the debut of Soviet actress Lyudmila Kasatkina. The film premiered in the USSR on 11 March 1955. The film deals with the romantic intrigues and longings of a small Russian circus family and those around them.

People's Actress of the USSR Kasatkina in 2005.

== Plot ==
Lena Vorontsova is the daughter of circus performers. Having fallen in love with the circus, for the incredible atmosphere that reigns in the arena and behind the scenes, she dreams of becoming a tamer. But so far she only cares for animals. The director invites motorcycle racer Fyodor Ermolaev to display an incredibly spectacular show number, right under the circus cupola. Lena is to assist him. The sailor Pyotr Mokin is hopelessly in love with Lena. But the girl’s heart belongs to Fyodor. He is also not indifferent to her, but prefers to hide his feelings. The tamer Almazov is fired for addiction to alcohol and violation of discipline. Now the place of the tamer is vacant, and Lena can make her cherished dream come true. Overcoming her fear, she starts to work, and tigers submit to her strong character and obey her. She has to choose between a timer's career and touring with a loved one as his assistant. Lena decides to follow an old dream. Ermolaev rents a room with an accountant, his daughter Olga dances in a circus corps de ballet, and her parents want to marry her to an artist. She takes the position of an assistant on tour, instead of Vorontsova. Fyodor can't overcome his longing from Lena. He regrets not revealing his feelings to Lena. The motorcycle racer finds out that at the next performance Lena will show her number with the tigers. He hurries to confess her love, just in time. The couple gains long-awaited happiness.

== Cast ==
=== Main roles ===
- Lyudmila Kasatkina — Yelena "Lena" Vorontsova
- Pavel Kadochnikov — Fyodor Nikolayevich Yermolayev
- Leonid Bykov — Petya Mokin
- Pavel Suhanov — Nikita Antonovich
- Konstantin Sorokin — Ferapont Ilyich, father of Olechka (Olga)
- Glikeriya Bogdanova-Chesnokova — Matiya Mikhailovna, mother of Olechkа (Olga)
- Nina Urgant — Olechka (Olga)
- Tatyana Pelttser — Emmy Styepanovna Vorontsova, mother of the main heroine
- Alexander Alexandrovich Orlov — Vasiliy Valiliyevich Vorobtsov, father of the main heroine
- Sergey Filippov — Kazimir Almazov
- Anatoliy Korolkevich — Mogikan
- Nikolay Trofimov — Myshkin

=== Supporting roles and substitutions ===
Names of the following persons mentioned on the cine-film:

- Pyotr Lobanov — Uncle Vasya
- Mikhail Ivanov — guitar player on the tug boat
- Margarita Nazarova — stunt double for Kasatkina in the scenes with tigers
- Vladimir Tsvetkov — the ringmaster

== Accolades ==
Tamer of Tigers received a Diploma at the Second International Film Festival in Durban, South Africa, under its English name, Tiger Girl.

== See also ==
- Mister X (1958 film)
- Striped Trip
