= I'm a Soldier Mom =

- Russian: Я солдат, мама
- Directed by: Manos Zacharias
- Written by: Leonid Rizin
- Starring: Vladimir Grammatikov; Anatoli Ilin; Vladimir Serababin; Sergey Shakurov; Valentin Zubkov
- Cinematography: Aleksandr Kharitonov
- Edited by: Valentina Kulagina
- Music by: Dzhon Ter-Tatevosyan
- Release date: 1966
- Running time: 89 minute
- Country: Soviet Union
- Language: Russian

I'm a Soldier Mom (Russian: Я солдат, мама) is a 1966 Soviet drama film directed by Manos Zacharias.

== Plot ==
A young, stubborn and undisciplined man goes to serve in the army, where he will understand the need for military service...

== Cast ==
- Vladimir Grammatikov
- Anatoli Ilin
- Vladimir Serababin as Voloshin (as Vlandimir Serobabin)
- Sergey Shakurov as Peganov
- Valentin Zubkov
