= At Your Threshold =

1962 film

- Russian: У твоего порога
- Directed by: Vasili Ordynsky
- Written by: Semyon Nagornyj
- Produced by: Mark Shadur
- Starring: Nadezhda Fedosova; Pyotr Lyubeshkin; Liliya Dzyuba; Boris Yurchenko; Yuri Gorobets
- Cinematography: Igor Slabnevich
- Music by: Venyamin Basner
- Production company: Mosfilm
- Release date: 1962
- Country: Soviet Union
- Language: Russian

At Your Threshold (Russian: У твоего порога, romanized: U tvoego poroga) is a 1962 Soviet war drama film directed by Vasili Ordynsky. The film's plot is based on real events from 1941 involving the defense of Moscow by use of anti-aircraft guns.

The film was officially released in the Soviet Union on March 27, 1963, where it was seen by 13.6 million viewers.

== Plot ==
The action of the film takes place in the fall of 1941, when the fascists were approaching Moscow, and the Russians, in their turn, sent zenith batteries against them.

== Cast ==
- Nadezhda Fedosova as Mother
- Pyotr Lyubeshkin as Father
- Liliya Dzyuba as Liza (as Liliya Dsyuba)
- Boris Yurchenko as Mikhail Prokhorenko
- Yuri Gorobets as Perekalin
- Nikolay Grabbe as Chauffeur Mikhail Vasilyevich
- Roman Khomyatov as Igor Bersenev
- Viktor Filippov as Yevsei Vasyuta
- Georgy Martyniuk as wounded on the train
- Yuri Smirnov as Siberian boy
- Vasili Ordynsky as cameo

== Reception ==
For her performance in the film, Nadezhda Fedosova won Best Supporting Actress at the eighth San Francisco International Film Festival.
