= Hot Snow (film) =

- Directed by: Gabriel Yegiazarov
- Written by: Yuri Bondarev
- Screenplay by: Yuri Bondarev; Evgeni Grigoriev; Gabriel Yegiazarov
- Produced by: Adolf Fradis
- Starring: Yuri Nazarov; Boris Tokarev; Anatoly Kuznetsov; Georgiy Zhzhonov
- Cinematography: Fiodor Dobronravov
- Music by: Alfred Schnittke
- Production company: Mosfilm
- Release date: 18 December 1972
- Running time: 105 minutes
- Country: Soviet Union
- Language: Russian

Hot Snow (Russian: Горячий снег, romanized: Goryachi Sneg) is a 1972 Soviet war film, directed by Gabriel Yegiazarov. Told through the eyes of a general, his lieutenants, and soldiers, the film portrays the difficult choices forced upon members of the Soviet Army during Operation Barbarossa, Nazi Germany's plan to destroy the Soviet Union.

== Plot ==
In December 1942, Red Army personnel gather at a train station to prepare for deployment. Despite freezing temperatures and months of bad news, spirits are high. Someone pulls out a guitar and everyone joins in song. Celebrations are interrupted by incoming Stukas. Soldiers scatter and run for cover as the Germans open fire. During the Second World War, the soldiers of a Red Army anti-tank gun battery face the onslaught of General von Manstein's armored divisions trying to relieve the besieged 6th Army in Stalingrad. Eventually only seven of them survive, but the German tank breakthrough is stopped, and in the final episode General Lieutenant Bessonov (Georgiy Zhzhonov) awards each of the survivors with the Order of Red Banner saying: "Thank you for tanks knocked out. That's all I can do... personally".

== Production ==
The film is an adaptation of Yuri Bondarev's eponymous 1969 novel, which was itself based on Bondarev's own wartime experience as a battery commander in Stalingrad.

In 2013, it was restored by Mosfilm.

== Reception ==
Hot Snow was viewed by 22.9 million people, but failed to secure any nominations or awards. It was viewed by 373,000 people in the Polish People's Republic.

== Select cast ==
- Yuri Nazarov as Sergeant Ukhanov
- Boris Tokarev as Lieutenant Kuznetsov
- Anatoly Kuznetsov as Vesnin
- Georgiy Zhzhonov as General Bessonov
- Vadim Spiridonov as Colonel Deev
- Igor Ledogorov as Osin, Colonel, Chief of Counterintelligence
- Nikolai Yeremenko Jr. as Drozdovsky
- Tamara Sedelnikova as Tanya (as T. Sedelnikova)
- Ara Babadzhanyan as Davlatyan (as A. Babadzhanyan)
- Aleksei Pankin as Chubarikov
