= Secret Agent's Destiny =

- Russian: Судьба резидента
- Directed by: Venyamin Dorman
- Written by: Oleg Shmelyov; Vladimir Vostokov
- Starring: Georgy Zhzhyonov; Mikhail Nozhkin; Andrei Vertogradov; Yefim Kopelyan; Rostislav Plyatt; Nikolai Prokopovich
- Cinematography: Mikhail Goykhberg
- Music by: Mikael Tariverdiev
- Release date: 1970
- Country: Soviet Union
- Language: Russian

Secret Agent's Destiny (Russian: Судьба резидента), also translated as Resident's Way, is a 1970 Soviet mystery film directed by Venyamin Dorman.

It is the second of four films based around the same character, the spy Mikhail Tulyev, played by Georgy Zhzhyonov. The first one, The Secret Agent's Blunder (Resident's Mistake) was made in 1968, while Resident Return (Resident Is Back) followed Destiny in 1982, with End of the Resident Project released in 1986.

== Plot ==
After the arrest of Tuleyev, Soviet counterintelligence begins a radio game with the enemy. Messages signed "Nadezhda" continue to be sent to the Western intelligence center. KGB counterintelligence officer Pavel "Snipe" Sinitzyn, who feels genuine sympathy for Tuleyev, tries to persuade him to switch sides. He takes Tuleyev around the country and arranges a meeting with Maria and his son, whom Tuleyev sees for the first time. Tuleyev learns that his father, Count A. I. Tuleyev, did not die peacefully but under mysterious circumstances, likely murdered.

Elsewhere, at an international scientific conference, a young Soviet scientist named Borkov, carried away by enthusiasm, shares slightly too much about his work and immediately comes under the scrutiny of foreign intelligence. Apparently, Sinitzyn discovered this while stationed in a Western intelligence center in the previous film. Tuleyev's superiors conduct a recruitment operation against Borkov, blackmailing him over immoral behavior abroad and pressuring him into espionage. After some hesitation, Borkov reports the incident to the KGB. General Sergeyev's department then gains the opportunity to dismantle an espionage network in Moscow led by the diplomat Klotz.

Western handlers begin to suspect that "Nadezhda" may have been compromised and conduct a series of tests. Thanks to General Sergeyev's keen insight, these are successfully passed, including disguising a peaceful construction site as a strategic military facility.

Tuleyev gradually reconsiders his views and makes a conscious decision to work for the USSR. He is recalled, and in his place, the renowned Leonid Krug from the first film arrives from abroad. Tuleyev heads to the West as a Soviet resident, while Krug, just off the ship in Odessa, comes under the watchful eye of Sinitzyn.

== Cast ==
- Georgy Zhzhyonov as Mikhail Tulyev
- Mikhail Nozhkin as Pavel Sinitsyn
- Andrei Vertogradov as Vladimir Borkov
- Yefim Kopelyan as General Sergeev
- Rostislav Plyatt as Kazin
- Nikolai Prokopovich as Colonel Markov
- Nikolay Grabbe
- Zhanna Bolotova as Yulia
- Eve Kivi as Rimma
- Eleonora Shashkova as Marya
