= City of First Love =

1970 Soviet film

- Russian: Город первой любви
- Directed by: Boris Yashin; Manos Zacharias
- Written by: Semyon Nagorny
- Starring: Yelena Alekina; Natalya Egorova; Boris Galkin; Natalya Gvozdikova; Lidiya Konstantinova; Masha Odintsova
- Cinematography: Viktor Shejnin
- Edited by: N. Veselovskaya
- Music by: Yevgeny Ptichkin
- Release date: 1970
- Running time: 93 minute
- Country: Soviet Union
- Language: Russian

City of First Love (Russian: Город первой любви, romanized: Gorod pervoy lyubvi) is a 1970 Soviet drama film directed by Boris Yashin and Manos Zacharias.

The film consists of three short stories on a common theme. All stories take place in Stalingrad.

== Plot ==
=== Tsaritsyn – 1919 ===
During the Russian Civil War, not only did brother fight against brother, but vastly different personalities were thrown together—differing in temperament, passion, and class. The heroine, Tanya Preobrazhenskaya, played by Natalya Gvozdikova, is a romantic soul and the daughter of a gymnasium director. She meets her dream man, Filipp, who turns out to be a Red Army soldier. He takes Tanya with him from her family home to the front. This segment features one of the early standout performances of the 22-year-old Boris Galkin as the Red Army soldier in love with Tanya.

=== Stalingrad – 1929 ===
The melding of urban and rural life during the first five-year plan is portrayed through the lives of the builders of the Stalingrad Tractor Plant. A clever young man from the countryside, Semyon, played by Yuri Orlov, arrives in Stalingrad, seeking his profession and his future wife, Komsomol member Nyura. This role was the second film appearance for Olga Ostroumova, a recent graduate of GITIS, following her successful debut in “We'll Live Till Monday.” The film also marked the debuts of Natalya Yegorova and Leonid Filatov.

=== Stalingrad – 1942 ===
Greek director Manos Zacharias, a graduate of the Paris Institute of Cinematography and a resident of the USSR since 1949, created a moving cinematic vignette about the defense of Stalingrad during the Great Patriotic War. The first love between city defender Vladik Sergeyev and Lena is intense but fleeting, like an artillery flash. Vladik dies, and Lena remains in the besieged city. In his debut role, Stanislav Sadalsky, a first-year GITIS student, portrays the fallen defender of Stalingrad.

== Cast ==
- Yelena Alekina as Lena
- Natalya Egorova as Nika
- Boris Galkin as Filipp
- Natalya Gvozdikova as Tanya Preobrazhenskaya
- Lidiya Konstantinova as Lilya
- Lev Durov as Commissioner
- Yuriy Orlov as Semyon
- Olga Ostroumova as Nyura
- Stanislav Sadalskiy as Vladik Sergeyev
- Vladimir Nosik as Lieutenant
- Maria Vinogradova as a builder of a tractor factory
- Leonid Filatov as Boris
