= Punisher (1968 film) =

- Russian: Каратель
- Directed by: Manos Zacharias
- Written by: Giorgos Sevastikoglou; Oleg Stukalov
- Starring: Yevgeny Kindinov; Mariya Vandova; Viktor Sotsky-Voinicescu; Georgiy Burkov; Sergey Shakurov
- Cinematography: German Lavrov
- Music by: Mikis Theodorakis
- Release date: 1968
- Country: Soviet Union
- Language: Russian

Punisher (Russian: Каратель) is a 1968 Soviet romantic drama film directed by Manos Zacharias.

== Plot ==
The film is set in Greece during the period of the Greek junta. The soldier Vangelis is ordered to take part in the execution of a young communist, after a fellow soldier, Dimitris, refuses. Feeling guilty over his role in the execution, Vangelis tries to confide in his girlfriend Maria, but finds himself unable to do so. Instead he gets into a fight with a drunken passer-by, and flees from a military patrol, taking shelter in a local church, where he confesses to the priest. The priest tells Vangelis that he killed many Gestapo men during the Second World War in order to avenge the death of his parents, but was not able to find peace of mind. He is of the opinion that killing people is a terrible thing.

Vangelis's guilt deepens after time spent with friends, realising that in the event of a future civil war, he would likely find himself fighting with and killing his friends. At dawn he finds Maria and confesses what he has done to her. The two reconcile, and after escorting Maria to work, Vangelis allows himself to be arrested by the patrol for the previous night's fight, but is no longer prepared to submit to unjust orders. He is placed in the same cell as Dimitris, who was arrested for disobeying the order to join the firing squad. Vangelis asks if the person who was executed was his relative, but Dimitris replies no. Vangelis recognises that Dimitris's principles are the same as those of the priest. Killing is unjust.

== Cast ==
- Yevgeny Kindinov
- Mariya Vandova
- Viktor Sotsky-Voinicescu
- Georgiy Burkov
- Sergey Shakurov
- Sotiros Belevendis
- Armen Dzhigarkhanyan
- Leonid Kanevsky
- Svetlana Orlova
- Irina Paikina
