= They're Calling, Open the Door =

- Directed by: Alexander Mitta
- Written by: Aleksandr Volodin
- Produced by: R. Himmelfarb
- Starring: Elena Proklova; Rolan Bykov; Sergey Nikonenko
- Cinematography: Alexander Panasyuk
- Edited by: Maria Kareva
- Music by: Veniamin Basner
- Production companies: Mosfilm; CA Yunost
- Release date: 1965
- Running time: 79 min.
- Country: USSR
- Language: Russian

They're Calling, Open the Door (Russian: Звонят, откройте дверь, romanized: Zvonyat, otkroyte dver) is a Soviet feature film of 1965 directed by Alexander Mitta, the debut of the twelve-year-old Elena Proklova in the cinema.

A fifth-grade student, Tanya (Elena Proklova), is in love with the pioneer leader Petya (Sergey Nikonenko), who is teased by one of her classmates. Tanya's father is a geologist, and her mother left for a while to see her husband; Tanya lives alone under the supervision of a neighbor in a communal apartment. To please the pioneer leader, she takes part in the search for an interesting person, one of the first soviet pioneers.

== Plot ==
Fifth-grader Tanya (played by Elena Proklova) has a crush on her school's senior Pioneer leader, tenth-grader Petya (played by Sergey Nikonenko). Her classmates tease her relentlessly for her feelings. Tanya's father, a geologist, is away on an expedition, and her mother has temporarily joined him, leaving Tanya under the care of a neighbor. Determined to impress Petya, Tanya immerses herself in school community activities and is assigned the task of finding an "interesting person"—one of the first pioneers.

During her search, Tanya meets her peer Genka (played by Viktor Kosykh) and his eccentric stepfather Pavel Vasilyevich Kolpakov (played by Rolan Bykov), who offers to help. Kolpakov introduces her to a renowned musician, Korkin, who agrees to attend the school event dedicated to the first pioneers but forgets as his concert tour approaches. Meanwhile, Tanya notices Petya holding a pair of skates and persuades Genka to teach her how to skate. During a trip to the rink, she sees Petya with a classmate, leaving her heartbroken. She retreats home, only to find her mother has unexpectedly returned.

When Korkin's absence at the event is revealed, Tanya sees it as poetic justice for Petya, whom she now views as disloyal. With the gathering approaching, she seeks out Kolpakov for advice, and he shares a moving story about a young bugler, a pioneer hero who lived next door to him and inspired his career as a professional musician. Tanya convinces Kolpakov to attend the event and share his story. However, when she asks Petya for permission to let Kolpakov speak, he refuses, adhering strictly to protocol. This final act of rigidity leads Tanya to lose faith in him entirely.

At the gathering, the bugler's performance falters, and Kolpakov steps in unexpectedly, captivating the audience with his tale of the young pioneer bugler who died during World War II. The emotional story leaves the students and Petya deeply moved, as the Pioneer leader hurriedly takes notes in his notebook. Kolpakov concludes by playing a stirring tune on his bugle, filling the hall with powerful, resonant sound and leaving an indelible impression on everyone present.

== Cast ==
- Elena Proklova as Tanya Nechaeva
- Rolan Bykov as Pavel Vasilievich Kolpakov
- Sergey Nikonenko as Petya Kryuchkov
- Vladimir Belokurov as violinist Korkin
- Viktor Kosykh as Genka
- Valentina Vladimirova as watchman in theater
- Oleg Yefremov as Vasily Dresvyannikov
- Lyusyena Ovchinnikova as Tanya's mother
- Iya Savvina as Genka's mother
- Vladimir Balon as teacher of fencing
- Yekaterina Vasilyeva as physical education teacher
- Klara Rumyanova as Klara Mikhailovna
- Andrei Smirnov as tenant
- Pavel Lebeshev as Petya Kryuchkov's neighbor

== Awards ==
- Venice Film Festival: Lion of San Marco — Grand Prize (Alexander Mitta)
- Mosfilm Award: Best Actress (Elena Proklova)
