= Vasily Solovyov-Sedoy =

Russian composer (1907–1979)

- Василий Соловьёв-Седой
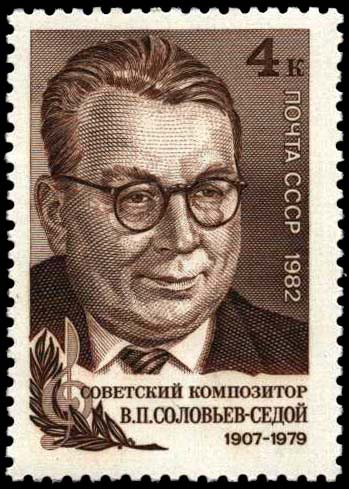
- 1982 Soviet postage stamp commemorating 75th anniversary of Solovyov-Sedoi's birth
- Born: Vasily Pavlovich Solovyov; 25 April 1907; Saint Petersburg, Russian Empire
- Died: 2 December 1979 (aged 72); Leningrad, Soviet Union
- Occupation: Composer
- Style: Classical

Vasily Pavlovich Solovyov-Sedoy (Василий Павлович Соловьёв-Седой; 25 April [O.S. 12 April] 1907 – 2 December 1979) was a Soviet classical composer and songwriter who was born and died in Leningrad.

Originally named Solovyov, when he entered the Union of Soviet Composers he added the suffix "Sedoy", meaning grey-haired, to avoid confusion with another composer with the same surname.

Solovyov-Sedoy composed the music for many songs such as "Moscow Nights" (Russian: Подмосковные вечера) and "Nightingales" (Russian: Соловьи). He also wrote music for numerous films.

== Filmography ==
- Heavenly Slug (1945)
- The First Glove (1946)
- World Champion (1954)
- Good Morning (1955)
- Maksim Perepelitsa (1955)
- Be Careful, Grandma! (1960)
- Don Tale (1964)
- The Salvos of the Aurora Cruiser (1965)
- Virineya (1968)
- Fitil (1975)
- Sweet Woman (1976)
- A Taiga Story (1979)
