= Also People =

1959 film

- Russian: Тоже люди
- Directed by: Georgiy Daneliya
- Written by: Georgiy Daneliya; Leo Tolstoy
- Starring: Lev Durov; Vladimir Ferapontov; Yevgeni Kudryashov; Vsevolod Sanaev; Manos Zacharias
- Cinematography: Nikolay Olonovskiy
- Release date: 1959
- Running time: 14 minute
- Country: Soviet Union
- Language: Russian

Also People (Russian: Тоже люди, romanized: Tozhe lyudi) is a 1959 Soviet short film directed by Georgiy Daneliya. based on scene of War and Peace by Leo Tolstoi.

== Plot ==
The film takes place during the war of 1812, when Napoleon's army is defeated and retreats. In the center of the plot are three Russian soldiers who are stationed in the forest.

Zaletaev brags that he "took Poleon twice prisoner". Senior soldiers laugh and go to bed. Suddenly, two cold, hungry, barefoot French soldiers come out from behind the bushes, straying from their unit. One of them falls in exhaustion. Russians carried him to the Colonel. Then they treat the second Frenchman porridge and poured him vodka. Warmed up, half-asleep Frenchman humming a song, Zaletaev echoes him. A French soldier falls asleep in his lap. "Also people!" an old soldier exclaims.

== Cast ==
- Lev Durov as Zaletayev, young soldier
- Yevgeni Kudryashov as middleaged soldier
- Vsevolod Sanaev as old soldier
- Manos Zacharias as French officer
- Vladimir Ferapontov as French officer
