= When I Become a Giant =

- Directed by: Inna Tumanyan
- Starring: Mikhail Olegovich Yefremov; Liya Akhedzhakova
- Release date: 1979
- Running time: 87 minutes
- Country: Soviet Union
- Language: Russian

When I Will Become a Giant (Russian: Когда я стану великаном, romanized: Kogda ya stanu velikanom) is a 1979 Soviet romance film directed by Inna Tumanyan.

== Plot ==
The main character, eighth-grader Petya Kopeikin, a self-proclaimed "troublemaker" as his teacher describes, disrupts the school play Cyrano de Bergerac out of dislike for his classmate Fedya Lastochkin, a show-off chosen to play Cyrano. This incident sparks a "Cyrano-like" rivalry between Kopeikin and Lastochkin.

Petya, an unassuming boy frustrated by his short stature but always at the center of attention, is secretly in love with his classmate Masha Goroshkina. However, Masha is interested in Koly Kristallov, a mediocre newcomer in the ninth grade. Kopeikin agrees to act as a go-between, delivering notes from Masha to Kristallov. Knowing Masha’s love of poetry, Petya even writes verses for Kristallov to pass off as his own.

Masha is charmed, believing Kristallov is both a poet and a "renaissance man" (he’s also a basketball player). Petya nobly continues to help make Masha’s wishes come true.

Fedya Lastochkin seizes the chance to retaliate against Petya, revealing Petya's feelings for Masha to Kristallov. Armed with proof of Petya’s affection, Kristallov confronts him, telling him he’s "not someone Masha could like." Since Petya and Masha are neighbors, with balconies close enough to overhear, Masha catches the exchange and realizes who truly wrote the poems. She recognizes Petya’s sincere affection and noble actions, while seeing Kristallov for what he really is—an empty shell.

== Cast ==
- Mikhail Olegovich Yefremov - Petya Kopeykin
- Liya Akhedzhakova - Juliette Ashotovna (English teacher)
- Inna Ulyanova - Elvira Pavlovna
- Marina Shimanskaya - Lidiya Nikolaevna
- Oleg Yefremov -
