= A Little Crane =

- Russian poster
- Russian: Журавушка
- Directed by: Nikolay Moskalenko
- Written by: Mikhail Alekseyev; Dmitri Vasiliu
- Starring: Lyudmila Chursina; Nonna Mordyukova; Tatyana Pelttser; Rimma Markova; Armen Dzhigarkhanyan
- Cinematography: Nikolay Olonovskiy
- Edited by: Aleksandra Kamagorova
- Music by: Yuriy Levitin
- Production company: Mosfilm
- Release date: 1968
- Running time: 85 minutes
- Country: Soviet Union
- Language: Russian

A Little Crane (Russian: Журавушка) is a 1968 Soviet romantic drama film directed by Nikolay Moskalenko.

== Plot ==
The film takes place after the war. Surviving soldiers return to their native village. Among them was not Martha's husband, whom she had been waiting for all these years, but nevertheless she remained faithful to him.

== Cast ==
- Lyudmila Chursina as Marfa
- Nonna Mordyukova as Glafira
- Tatyana Pelttser as Nastasya
- Rimma Markova as Avdotya
- Armen Dzhigarkhanyan as Styshnoy
- Nikolai Gritsenko as Markelov
- Georgi Zhzhonov as Father Leonid
- Evgeniy Shutov as Zulya
- Aleksei Karpushkin as Seryozha (as Alyosha Karpushkin)
