= Three Days of Viktor Chernyshov =

- Russian: Три дня Виктора Чернышёва
- Directed by: Mark Osepyan
- Written by: Evgeny Grigorev
- Starring: Gennadi Korolkov; Valentina Vladimirova; Alexey Chernov; Lev Prygunov; Gennady Sayfulin
- Cinematography: M. Jakowitsch
- Music by: Aleksey Rybnikov
- Release date: 1968
- Country: Soviet Union
- Language: Russian

Three Days of Viktor Chernyshov (Russian: Три дня Виктора Чернышёва, romanized: Tri dnya Viktora Chernyshova) is a 1968 Soviet drama film directed by Mark Osepyan.

== Plot ==
The film follows the monotonous life of Viktor Chernyshev, a young Soviet man who, after finishing school, chooses not to pursue higher education and instead becomes a lathe operator at a factory. His days are repetitive and uneventful, divided between work and attending uninspiring Komsomol meetings where trivial tasks are assigned, such as participating in agricultural labor or filling out crowds for events. Evenings offer little excitement, as Viktor loiters with a group of acquaintances, listening to their stories and partaking in meaningless pastimes. Among them is Kolya, an idler who brags about his conquests, and Pyotr, a hardworking doctor who stands apart as the only voice of reason, urging Viktor and others to reconsider their aimless existence.

== Cast ==
- Gennadi Korolkov as Viktor Chernyshev
- Valentina Vladimirova as Katerina, Viktor's Mother
- Alexey Chernov as Uncle Pavel
- Lev Prygunov as Anton
- Gennady Sayfulin as Kolya
- Valeri Belyakov as Pyotr
- Ivan Kuznetsov as Semen Andreyevich
- D. Chukovsky as Rakmanov
