= Vladimir Fetin =

Soviet film director (1925–1981)

- Владимир Фетин
- Born: Vladimir Aleksandrovich Fetting; October 14, 1925; Moscow, Russian SFSR, Soviet Union
- Died: August 20, 1981 (aged 55); Leningrad, Soviet Union
- Occupation: Film director
- Years active: 1959–1981
- Spouse: Lyudmila Chursina (second wife)
- Awards: Merited Artist of the RSFSR

Vladimir Aleksandrovich Fetin (né Fetting; Russian: Владимир Александрович Фетин; 14 October 1925 — 20 August 1981) was a Soviet film director. He was named Merited Artist of the RSFSR in 1975.

== Biography ==
Vladimir Fetin was born in Moscow into a noble Russian-German Fetting family which traced its history to Pyotr Ivanovich Fetting (born Pierre Friedrich de Fetting), a military engineer who moved to the Russian Empire from Berlin in 1812. In 1943 he was enlisted in the Red Army and fought in the first reserve artillery corps. He changed several professions after the war, then entered the director's faculty at VGIK, a workshop led by Sergei Gerasimov which he finished in 1959.

His diploma short The Colt based on Mikhail Sholokhov's story saw a theatrical release by Lenfilm where he had been working since. It was compared favourably with the French movie White Mane by foreign critique. Fetting's surname appeared as "Fetin" in the credits, he adopted it and used in all of his movies.

In 1960 he was approached with an ambitious screenplay of a comedy about a ship overran by tigers. It was written with the famous tiger tamer Margarita Nazarova in mind who agreed to play the main part while her husband and circus partner Konstantin Konstantinovsky was to manage tigers and perform various stunts. Striped Trip was shot on board of a motor vessel in the Black Sea, with ten tigers, a lion and a chimpanzee acting along with popular comedy actors. It was released in 1961 to an overwhelming success, becoming the Soviet box leader with 45.8 mln viewers.

After that Fetin turned back to dramas and directed Don Tale (1964), another Sholokhov adaptation based on two of his early stories. Once again he cast Yevgeny Leonov in the main part along with Lyudmila Chursina whom he married shortly after the film was released, again, to a success, becoming the 7th most popular Soviet movie of 1964 with 31.8 mln viewers. His drama Sweet Woman was seen by 31.3 mln people, becoming the 12th most successful Soviet film of 1977.

Vladimir Fetin died on 20 August 1981 from heart attack, shortly after finishing Lost Among the Living. He was buried in Leningrad at the South Cemetery.

He was married three times, with a son from the first marriage and a daughter from the third. His second wife, an actress Lyudmila Chursina (born 1941), starred in four of his movies in the leading roles. According to her, Fetin developed a drinking problem while waiting for new projects which led to a split and ruined his health.

== Filmography ==
- 1959 — The Colt (Жеребёнок)
- 1961 — Striped Trip (Полосатый рейс)
- 1963 — Big Fitil (Большой фитиль), the Payoff episode (Расплата)
- 1964 — Don Tale (Донская повесть)
- 1968 — Virineya (Виринея)
- 1970 — Lyubov Yarovaya (Любовь Яровая)
- 1973 — Open Book (Открытая книга)
- 1975 — Fitil (Фитиль), The Flying Saucers episode (Летающие тарелки)
- 1976 — Sweet Woman (Сладкая женщина)
- 1979 — A Taiga Story (Таёжная повесть)
- 1981 — Lost Among the Living (Пропавшие среди живых)
