= Sergey Shakurov =

Soviet-Russian actor (born 1942)

- Сергей Шакуров
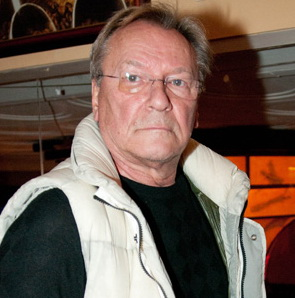
- Shakurov in 2010
- Born: Sergey Kayumovich Shakurov; 1 January 1942 (age 83); Moscow, Russian SFSR, Soviet Union
- Citizenship: Soviet Union; Russia
- Occupation: Actor
- Years active: 1964–present
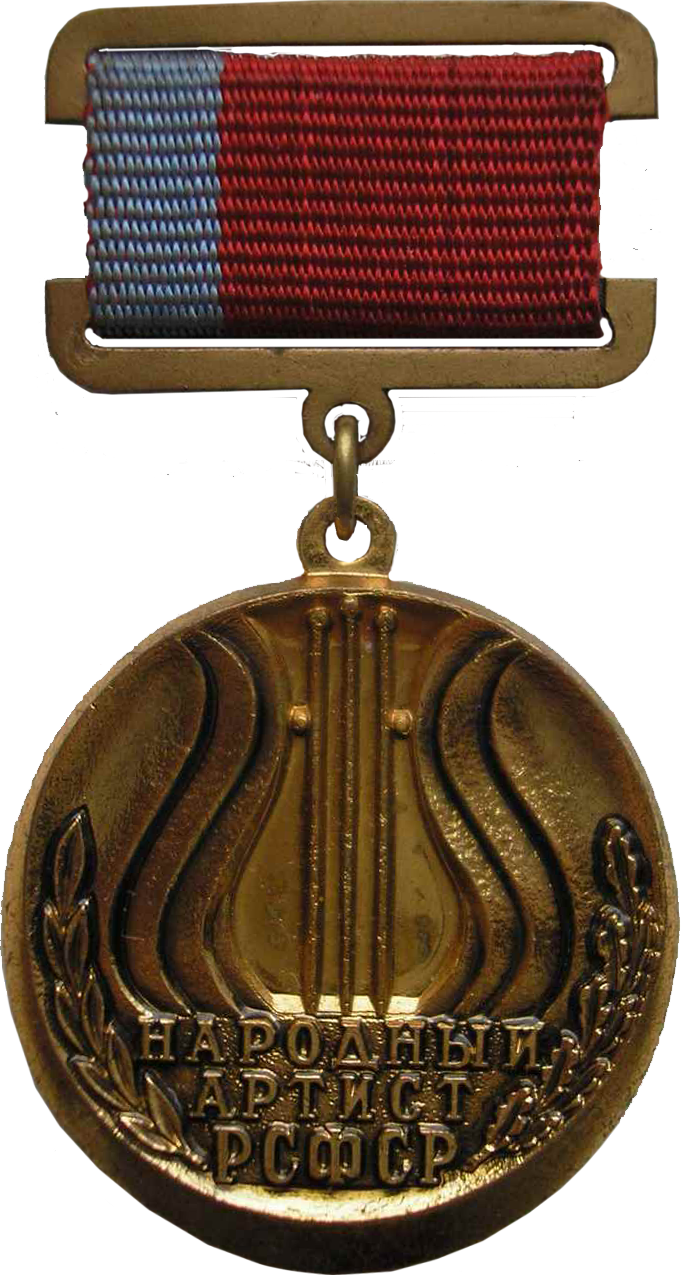
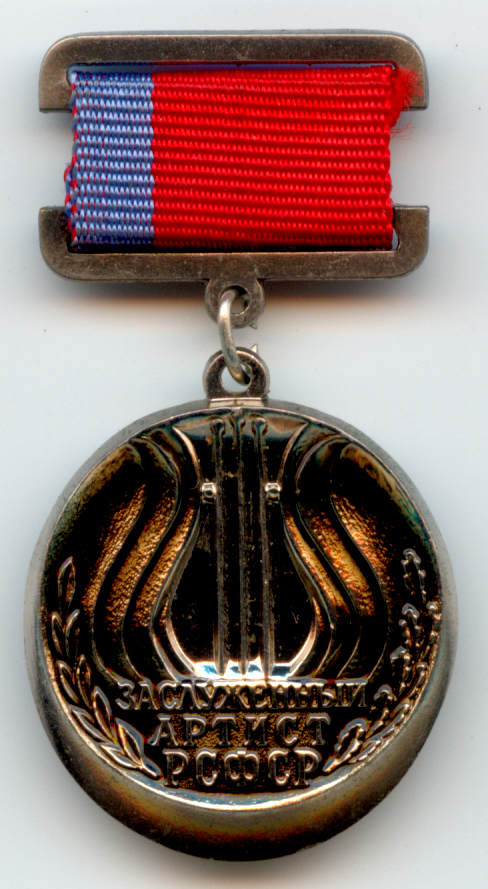
- Awards
- Website: sergey-shakurov.ru

Sergey Kayumovich Shakurov (Russian: Сергей Каюмович Шакуров, Tatar: Сергей Каюм улы Шәкүров, romanized: Sergey Qayum ulı Şäkürov; born 1 January 1942) is a Soviet and Russian actor of theater. He has appeared in more than ninety films since 1967.

== Life and career ==
Sergey Shakurov was born in Russian-Tatar family in Moscow. His father was Mishar Tatar from Simbirsk Governorate. In 1964, after graduating from the school-studio, actor started working at the Theatre on Malaya Bronnaya, and a year later he was accepted into the troupe of the Central Academic Theatre of the Soviet Army. He left the theater together with Leonid Kheyfetz for the Maly Theatre after the cancellation of the play Two Friends by Vladimir Voinovich, but was not accepted. Since 1971, Sergey Shakurov worked in the Stanislavsky Drama Theatre. He also worked in the Moscow Youth Theatre.

His movie career began in 1966, when he made his debut on screen appearing in the lead role in the Manos Zacharias movie I'm a Soldier Mom. He played Peganov, stubborn and difficult to discipline rookie confronted by an experienced foreman (Valentin Zubkov).

In 2015 Shakurov started to work in television. He was a member of jury on a show Together with dolphins on Channel One Russia, was the voice-over of the documentary project Heroes of our time on NTV and served as a host of the program Wait for Me from 2017 to 2018.

== Selected filmography ==
Sergey Shakurov has starred in over 114 films.

Film
| Year | Title | Role | Notes |
|---|---|---|---|
| 1966 | I'm a Soldier Mom | Peganov | |
| 1970 | Passing Through Moscow | Stepan | |
| 1970 | It Was in May | Margoslin | |
| 1974 | At Home Among Strangers | Zabelin | |
| 1975 | One Hundred Days After Childhood | Seryozha | |
| 1979 | Siberiade | Spiridon Solomin | |
| 1983 | Anna Pavlova | Michel Fokine | |
| 1984 | Planet Parade | Sultan | |
| 1986 | Summer Impressions of Planet Z | Aleksey Mukhin | |
| 1987 | Friend | Nikolay Nikitin | |
| 1989 | Two Arrows. Stone Age Detective | Ladies' man | |
| 1990 | The Suicide | Podsekalnikov | |
| 1990 | Dogs' Feast | Arkady Petrovich | |
| 1990 | Disintegration | Aleksandr | |
| 1993 | Szwadron | Lieutenant Egor Zhurin | |
| 1994 | Pigs 2: The Last Blood | Colonel Yakushin | |
| 1999 | Pan Tadeusz | Rykow | |
| 2000 | The Christmas Miracle | Astronaut | |
| 2002 | Antikiller | Cross | |
| 2003 | Antikiller 2: Antiterror | Cross | |
| 2005 | Brezhnev | Leonid Brezhnev | |
| 2007 | Konservy | Foma | |
| 2007 | Paragraph 78 | member of the Military Tribunal | |
| 2009 | O Lucky Man! | Konstantin Germanovich | |
| 2011 | Vysotsky. Thank You For Being Alive | Semyon, father of Vladimir Vysotsky | |
| 2016 | Flight Crew | Igor Gushchin, Alexey's father | |

TV
| Year | Title | Role | Notes |
|---|---|---|---|
| 1983 | The Treasures of Agra | Jonathan Small | the fourth part TV series |
| 1987 | Visit to Minotaur | attorney Tikhonov / Antonio Stradivari | Mini-Series |
| 2011 | Peter the Great: The Testament | Prince Fyodor Romodanovsky | Mini-Series |
| 2011 | The White Guard | Hetman Pavlo Skoropadskyi | TV series |
| 2015 | Catherine The Great | Count Alexey Bestuzhev-Ryumin | |
| 2020 | Passengers | Master | TV series |
| 2021 | Master | Valery Ryumin | TV series |
| 2024 | A Killer's Mind | Nikola, Timofey's grandfather | TV series |
