= Don Tale =

- Russian: Донская повесть
- Directed by: Vladimir Fetin
- Written by: Mikhail Sholokhov; Arnold Vitol
- Starring: Yevgeny Leonov; Lyudmila Chursina; Aleksandr Blinov; Boris Novikov; Nikolai Melnikov
- Cinematography: Yevgeni Kirpichyov
- Edited by: Ye. Orlova
- Music by: Vasily Solovyov-Sedoy
- Production company: Lenfilm
- Release date: 9 October 1964
- Running time: 91 min.
- Country: Soviet Union
- Language: Russian

Don Tale (Russian: Донская повесть, romanized: Donskaya povest) is a 1964 Soviet drama film directed by Vladimir Fetin. based on the stories “Shibalkovo Seed” and “Birthmark” by Mikhail Sholokhov.

The film tells about a red Cossack and his beloved woman, who, during childbirth, confesses to him that he is a spy for the White Guards.

== Plot ==
A Red Army soldier attempts to feed an infant with mare's milk. In later scenes, he is shown as a machine gunner on a tachanka (a horse-drawn cart) in the Red Hundred led by Koshevoy, pursuing a bandit gang led by another Koshevoy (his namesake). According to Sholokhov's story The Birthmark, the bandit leader was the father of the Red commander, Nikolka Koshevoy.

The infant interferes with the soldier's duties, so he leaves the child at an orphanage. There, he recounts the backstory of the infant’s mother, Darya, whom the soldiers had found at a mill. Darya confessed that she had been raped by bandits. The machine gunner, Yakov, takes her under his protection, but her presence demoralizes the unit. The commander considers leaving her at the nearest village, but during a battle, Darya saves the tachanka after frightened horses begin to flee. She becomes the tachanka’s coachman and seduces Yakov.

When they pass near her home village, Darya secretly informs her relatives that the Red unit is out of ammunition. Pregnant, she begs Yakov to leave the unit and escape with her. Meanwhile, the Cossacks attack the Red unit, nearly wiping it out. A dramatic scene unfolds as the Cossacks allow the Red orchestra to play The Internationale, only to execute the musicians mid-performance. Yakov and Darya manage to escape, finding the remnants of the Red unit, including the mortally wounded commander.

Darya goes into labor and confesses to Yakov that she betrayed the unit by revealing their lack of ammunition to the Cossacks. Yakov tells the surviving soldiers about her treachery. While one fighter, Chubukov, demands her immediate execution, others argue that vigilante justice would make them no better than the bandits. They decide to postpone the matter.

Yakov returns to Darya, takes her newborn child, and kills her with a rifle. For Yakov, the infant becomes his only family, although Chubukov suggests that the child’s father might be the bandit leader himself. Unable to feed the baby without milk, Yakov tries to persuade a young Cossack woman with a child of her own to nurse the baby. When she refuses, calling him a "red Cossack," Yakov forces her at gunpoint to breastfeed the infant.

The story ends with Yakov leaving the child at an orphanage. Before departing, he names the infant Nikolka, after the fallen commander of the Red Hundred.

== Cast ==
- Yevgeny Leonov as Yakov Shibalok
- Lyudmila Chursina as Darya
- Aleksandr Blinov as Nikolka
- Boris Novikov as Ivan Chudukov
- Nikolai Melnikov as Alyosha
- Alexey Gribov as Kuzmich
- Valentina Vladimirova as Frosya
- Sergei Lyakhnitsky as Ivanich
- Georgy Shtil as Zotov
- Georgy Satini as gang leader
