= Georgiy Zhzhonov =

Russian actor and writer (1915–2005)

- Георгий Жжёнов
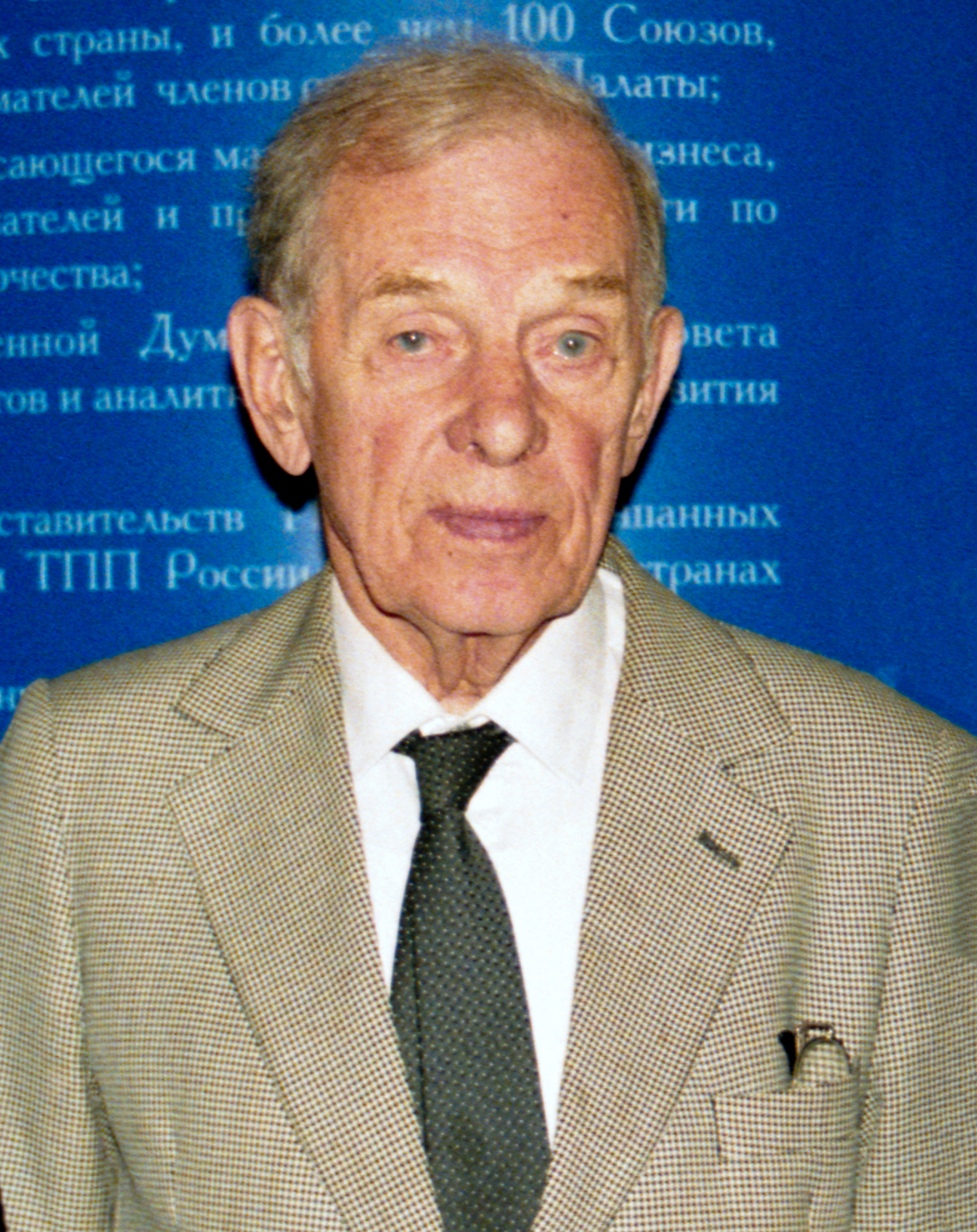
- Zhzhonov in 2002
- Born: 22 March [O.S. 9 March] 1915; Petrograd, Russian Empire
- Died: 8 December 2005 (aged 90)
- Citizenship: Soviet
- Education: Leningrad Theatrical School
- Occupation: Actor
- Awards: Order "For Merit to the Fatherland", Order of Lenin, Order of the Red Banner of Labour, Medal "Veteran of Labour", Medal "In Commemoration of the 250th Anniversary of Leningrad", People's Artist of the USSR, People's Artist of the RSFSR, Honored Artist of the RSFSR, Vasilyev Brothers State Prize of the RSFSR

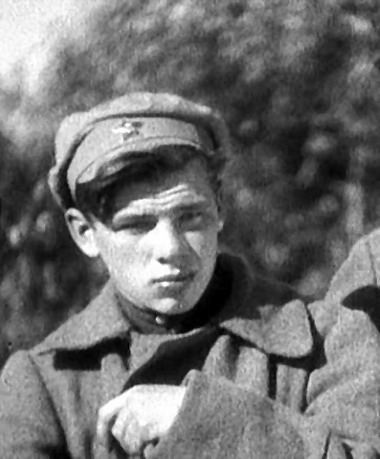
Georgiy Zhzhonov as Teryoshka in the film Chapaev (1934)

Georgiy Stepanovich Zhzhonov (Russian: Гео́ргий Степа́нович Жжёнов, IPA: [ɡʲɪˈorɡʲɪj sʲtʲɪˈpanəvʲɪdʑ ˈʐːonəf]; (Note: In isolation, Степа́нович is pronounced [sʲtʲɪˈpanəvʲɪtɕ].) 22 March 1915 – 8 December 2005), was a Soviet and Russian stage and film actor and writer. He is known for playing the spy Mikhail Tulyev in the "Resident" quartet of films, Beware of the Car (1966), The Hot Snow (1973), and many others, and was a popular actor. He was appointed People's Artist of the USSR in 1980.

== Early life and education ==
Zhzhonov's parents grew up in a peasant family from the Tver Region. His mother was his father's second wife, and there were five children in this family. They moved to the city and his father opened his own bakery, but never became wealthy.

Zhzhonov was born on 22 March 1915, and, like many of his peers, finished school in grade seven. He then studied acrobatics at the Leningrad College of Circus and Estrada Arts, and started to give performances with a friend. There he was spotted by film director Eduard Ioganson in 1932, and asked him to play the part a tractor driver in the film Hero's Mistake. After this break, Zhzhonov was accepted by the Leningrad Theatrical School, where he studied under renowned director Sergei Gerasimov, graduating in 1935.

== Career ==
=== Incarceration ===
Travelling in a train with Nikolai Kryuchkov and Pyotr Aleynikov on a train, he met an American diplomat, and later he was charged with espionage related to this man he barely knew.

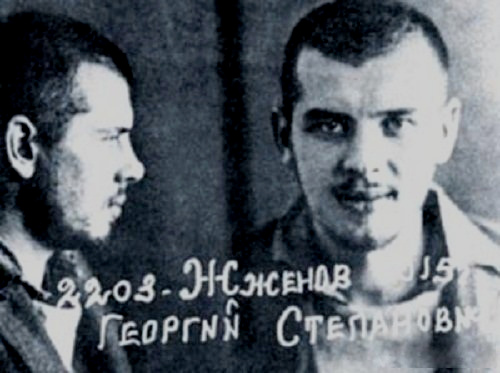
Zhzhonov as a prisoner

In 1936, Zhzhonov's brother Boris, a Leningrad University student, was arrested for "anti-Soviet activities and terrorist leanings", during a period of political repression by the government in the wake of the assassination of Sergei Kirov. Zhzhonov's family was exiled to Kazakhstan; however, Georgiy instead headed to the set of Komsomolsk, a film being made by Gerasimov in Komsomolsk-on-Amur. In 1938, Zhzhonov was arrested on political motives was forced to confess, and sentenced multiple times to seventeen years in the gulag at Kolyma. Put to work as a logger and gold miner, he managed to survive, unlike his brother Boris, who died of exhaustion in Vorkuta, and another brother who was executed by firing squad. Just before Victory Day (9 May) in spring 1945, Zhzhonov was released on parole and sent to work at the Magadan Theatre. Two years later he was fully released, thanks to the efforts of Gerasimov (although banned from living in larger industrial cities), and went to Sverdlovsk. Here he was able to do some film acting when the studios were open.

He was again arrested in 1949 and this time exiled to Norilsk, where he took stage roles with the local drama theatre until 1953. He was finally exonerated at the age of 38 (around 1953).

=== Return to Leningrad ===
He returned to Leningrad around 1954, first working at the regional drama theatre, then Lensovet Theatre, until 1962.

He started taking on cameo roles in films. In 1966 his role as a compassionate traffic warden in Eldar Ryazanov's comedy Beware of the Car was noticed. In 1968 (Note: The "Russian Cross" source says 1966, but all other sources, including Vimeo and IMDb, say 1968.) and he played the spy Mikhail Tulyev in The Secret Agent's Blunder (Resident's Mistake), directed by Venyamin Dorman. This was the first of a quartet of films based around the same character. The sequel, Secret Agent's Destiny (or Resident's Way) was released in 1970, with Resident Return (Resident Is Back) in 1982 and End of the Resident Project in 1986.

He also met director Yuly Karasik on the set of The Man I Love at this time, but in the meantime his relationship with Igor Vladimirov, director of Lensovet, deteriorated to the point that Zhzhonov left Leningrad and went to Moscow. There he joined Mossovet Theatre, led by Yuri Zavadsky.

Ironically, Zhzhonov was frequently cast in the roles of policemen and KGB agents. This Gulag victim was even awarded a special KGB prize for the screen versions of three novels by Yulian Semyonov. Zhzhonov was also invited to play Stierlitz, but declined for personal reasons.

In later life, Zhzhonov was a member of the jury at human rights International Human Rights Film Festival "Stalker", which toured the country.

== Writing ==
Zhzhonov loved literature, and wrote short stories when he was a young man, although they were not published. Later, he wrote memoirs of his days in the gulags, as well as a novel, From Capercaillie to the Firebird and a number of stories.

== Honours, recognition and awards ==
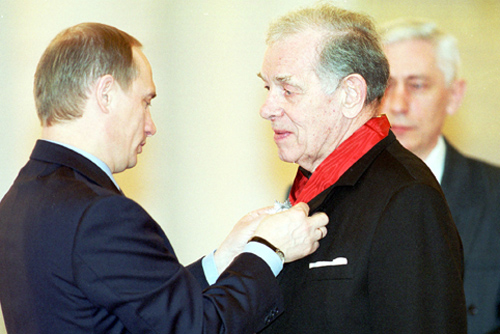
President Vladimir Putin, decorating Georgiy Zhzhonov

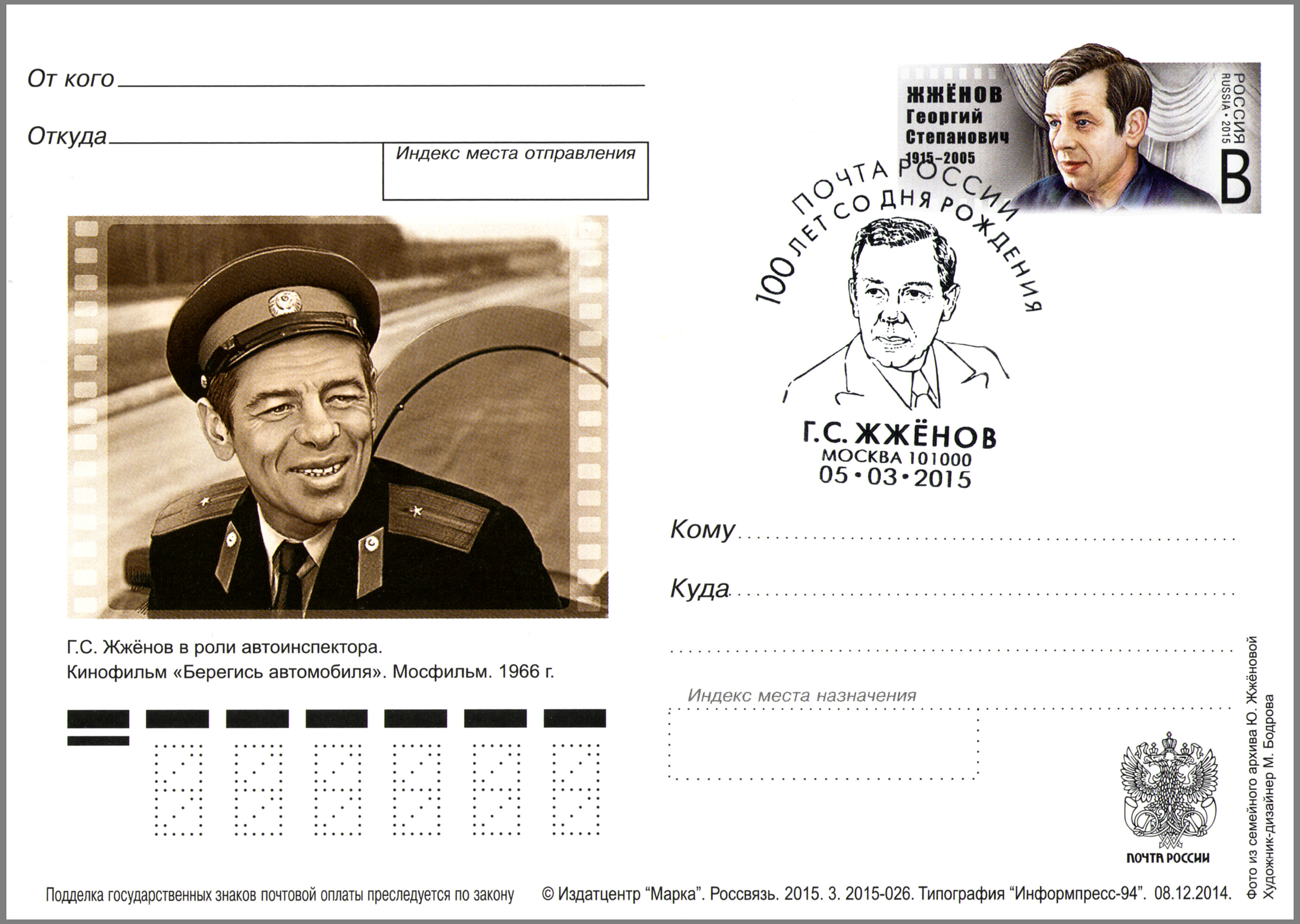
Georgiy Zhzhonov as the Patrol officer in the film Beware of the Car (1966). The postcard issued to commemorate his 100th birthday. Russian Post, 2015.

He was appointed People's Artist of the USSR in 1980.

His awards include:

- Medal "In Commemoration of the 250th Anniversary of Leningrad"
- Medal "In Commemoration of the 850th Anniversary of Moscow"
- Medal "Veteran of Labour"
- Honored Artist of the RSFSR (1969)
- Vasilyev Brothers State Prize of the RSFSR (1973), for his performance as General Bessonov in the movie Hot Snow
- People's Artist of the RSFSR (1979)
- People's Artist of the USSR (1980)
- Order of the Red Banner of Labour (1985)
- Order of Lenin (1991)
- Lifetime Achievement Award, Sozvezdie International Film Festival (1992)
- Crystal Turandot Award (1995)
- Order "For Merit to the Fatherland", 4th class (1995)
- Nika Award (1997)
- Vyborg Walk of Actors Fame (1998)
- Order "For Merit to the Fatherland", 2nd class (2000)
- Monument to him unveiled in Chelyabinsk (2000)
- International Human Rights Film Festival "Stalker" prize named Georgiy Zhzhonov Special Prize

In 2005, Zhzhonov spent his 90th birthday acting in the Russian Army Theatre. Later that day, he was invited to the Kremlin to be invested with the highest civilian decoration of Russia. During a conversation that followed, President Putin admitted that Zhzhonov's roles had prompted him to become an intelligence officer.

== Personal life ==
Zhzhonov had an elder brother, Boris. He married four times, with three marriages producing a daughter.

He died of lung cancer on 8 December 2005, and was buried in Novodevichy Cemetery in Moscow.

== Filmography ==
- 1931: Road to Life
- 1932: Hero Error as Pavel Vetrov
- 1934: Chapaev as Teryoshka (uncredited)
- 1934: Crown Prince of the Republic as Bachelor-architect
- 1938: Komsomolsk as Mavrin
- 1949: Alitet Goes to the Mountains
- 1955: Other People's Relatives as guest on the wedding (uncredited)
- 1957: The Storm as Gavriil
- 1957: On the island of Far as Klepikov
- 1958: My dear man as Ustimenko
- 1958: The Night Guest as Sergey Petrovich, artist
- 1959: Corrected Believe as Braitsev
- 1960: Baltic Skies as driver
- 1961: A man Does not Give Up as Maslyukov
- 1961: He took the Train Driver as Ivan Chereda
- 1962: The Day You Get 30 Years Old as hospital patient
- 1962: Planeta Bur as Roman Bobrov
- 1963: Posledniy khleb as Militsia Major
- 1963: Malenkiye mechtateli as Fyodor
- 1963: Tretya raketa as Zheltykh
- 1963: Silence as Gnezdilov
- 1964: The Big Ore as surgeon
- 1965: The Hockey Players as Coach Sperantov
- 1965: Poka front v oborone as Sergey Nikolayevich
- 1965: Beloved as Ivan Yegorovich (voice)
- 1965: End of Squadron as Rayevsky
- 1965: O chyom molchala tayga as Grigoriy Anikin
- 1966: The Man I Love as Muromtsev
- 1966: Gibel eskadry
- 1966: Beware of the Car as Militsiya officer
- 1966: Idu iskat as Andrey Gusarov
- 1967: Chelovek, kotorogo ya lyublyu as Muromtsev
- 1967: Stewardess (TV Short) as passenger-screenwriter
- 1967: The Road to "Saturn" as Timerin
- 1967: Now You Judge as Arkadi Iskra
- 1967: Spring on the Oder as Petrovich 'Ryzheusyy'
- 1968: Doktor Vera as Sukhohlebov
- 1968: The Final Of Saturn as Timerin
- 1968: The Secret Agent's Blunder (Resident's Mistake), directed by Venyamin Dorman, as a spy, Mikhail Tulyev
- 1969: A Little Crane as Father Leonid
- 1969: Dawn Dates as Alexey Dmitrievich Vorobiev
- 1970: Ostrov Volchiy as Pavel Ilyich Tagilov
- 1970: Secret Agent's Destiny (Resident's Way) as Mikhail Tulyev
- 1971: Nechayannaya lyubov as Matvey Kontsevoy
- 1972: The End of the Lyubavins as Yemelyan Lyubavin
- 1971: All The King's Men (TV Mini-Series) as Stark
- 1972: Battle after the Victory as Timerin
- 1972: The Hot Snow as Bessonov
- 1972: Tracer Element as Nikita Alekseevich Dubrovin, KGB's Colonel
- 1973: Mechenyy atom as Nikita Dubrovin
- 1974: Tayna zabytoy perepravy as Kozyrev
- 1974: The Ocean as Maxim Ilyich Chasovnikov
- 1974: Ishchu moyu sudbu
- 1974: Looking for My Destiny as Vladimir Karjakin, teacher
- 1975: You will find in Battle (TV Movie) as Valentin Savvich Zbandut
- 1975: Choosing Target as Vitaliy Zubavin
- 1976: Takaya ona, igra as Viktor Basov
- 1977: Poseidon Comes to Rescue as Chigrinov
- 1978: The Cure Against Fear as general Sharapov
- 1980: Air Crew as Andrei Timchenko, Captain
- 1982: Krepysh as Shaposhnikov
- 1982: Resident Return (Resident Is Back) as Mikhail Tulyev
- 1984: Gate to Heaven as Colonel Ivan Lebedenko
- 1985: The City of Brides as Andrei Dmitrievich Prokhorov
- 1986: End of the Resident Project as Mikhail Tulyev
- 1986: The Time of Sons as Sergey Vasilevich Uzelkov
- 1987: The End of Eternity as Laban Twissel
- 1987: Ivan Veliky
- 1988: Enclosure as Menshikov, Ambassador of the USSR
- 1999: Viewless Traveller as Willie, Life Guards Medic (final film role)
