= Elena Proklova =

Soviet and Russian actress

- Елена Проклова
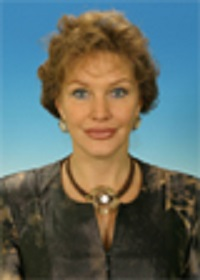
- Born: Elena Igorevna Proklova; 2 September 1953 (age 72); Moscow, USSR
- Occupations: actress, television presenter
- Years active: 1965–present
- Children: daughter Arina (1972) daughter Polina (1994)

Elena Igorevna Proklova (Russian: Елена Игоревна Проклова; born 2 September 1953 in Moscow, Russia) is a Soviet and Russian actress. Honored Artist of RSFSR. In 2021, the actress spoke about harassment at work. When she was 12 years old and working in a film, she was molested by the second director of the film. When she was 15 years old and she worked on the set of a film, a famous actor molested her and forced her to sleep with him and this lasted 2 years. And after her marriage to the director, the famous actor got angry, beat her and began to spread unpleasant gossip about her to people.

== Selected filmography ==
- They're Calling, Open the Door (Russian: Звонят, откройте дверь, 1965) as Tanya Nechaeva
- The Snow Queen (Снежная королева, 1966) as Gerda
- Transitional Age (Переходный возраст, 1968) as Olga Alekseyeva
- Shine, Shine, My Star (Гори, гори, моя звезда, 1970) as Christina Kotlyarenko
- Mimino (Мимино, 1977) as Larisa Ivanovna Komarova
- The Dog in the Manger (Собака на сене, 1978) as Marcela
- Be My Husband (Будьте моим мужем, 1982) as Natasha Kostikova
