= Margarita Nazarova (artist) =

- Маргарита Петровна Назарова
- Born: Margarita Petrovna Nazarova; 26 November 1926; Detskoye Selo, Trotsky district, Saint Petersburg Governorate, RSFSR
- Died: 25 October 2005 (aged 78); Nizhny Novgorod, Russia
- Occupations: Circus performer, tiger trainer, actress
- Years active: 1954—1983
- Spouse: Konstantin Konstantinovsky (m. 1958)

Margarita Petrovna Nazarova (Russian: Маргарита Петровна Назарова; November 26, 1926 in Detskoye Selo – October 26, 2005 in Nizhny Novgorod) was a Russian circus performer, tiger trainer and actress best known for her leading role in the 1961 comedy Striped Trip. She was awarded the title of People's Artist of the RSFSR.

== Filmography ==
- 1953 — Incident in the Taiga — participation in the crowd
- 1954 — Dangerous trails — understudy of Lilia Yudina
- 1955 — Tamer of Tigers — trainer (Lyudmila Kasatkina's understudy in scenes with tigers)
- 1961 — Striped Trip — the barmaid Marianne
- 1967 — Stewardess — episodic role
