= Perekhodnyy Vozrast =

- Russian: Переходный возраст
- Directed by: Richard Viktorov
- Written by: Aleksandr Khmelik
- Starring: Elena Proklova; Sergey Makeyev; Vitali Segeda; Aleksandr Barsky; Lena Bespalova
- Cinematography: Vadim Kornilyev
- Music by: Nikolay Karetnikov
- Release date: 1968
- Running time: 89 minute
- Country: Soviet Union
- Language: Russian

Perekhodnyy Vozrast (Russian: Переходный возраст) is a 1968 Soviet teen film directed by Richard Viktorov.

== Plot ==
The film tells about a 7th grade student named Olya, who enjoys a happy life. She has not only good parents and friends, but also a talent for writing wise verses.

== Cast ==
- Elena Proklova as Olga Alekseyeva
- Sergey Makeyev as Kolya (as Serjosha Makeyev)
- Vitali Segeda as Vitya
- Aleksandr Barsky as Seryozha (as Sasha Barsky)
- Lena Bespalova as Lena
