= Vyacheslav Sirin =

Estonian actor

- Vjatšeslav Sirin; Вячеслав Сирин
- Born: 3 September 1924; Moscow, Russian Empire
- Died: 17 September 1970 (aged 46); Tallinn, Estonian SSR, USSR
- Citizenship: Soviet
- Education: Lunacharsky State Institute for Theatre Arts
- Occupation: Actor
- Awards: Honored Artist of the Estonian SSR

Vyacheslav Sirin (Estonian: Vjatšeslav Sirin; Russian: Вячеслав Сирин; 1924–1970) was a Russian-born Estonian actor.

== Biography ==
Sirin was born on 3 September 1924 in Moscow, Russian Empire (present-day Russia).

In 1948, Sirin graduated from Lunacharsky State Institute for Theatre Arts (present-day Russian Institute of Theatre Arts).

From 1948 to 1970 Sirin worked at the Eesti NSV Riiklik Vene Draamateater (present-day Südalinna Theatre) in Tallinn.

In 1959, Sirin was awarded the Honored Artist of the Estonian SSR.

== Personal life ==
In 1947, Sirin married the actress and screenwriter Veera Fyodorova (1925–2015). Their son is the actor Aleksandr Sirin (1955–).

Sirin died on 17 September 1970 aged 46 in Tallinn, Estonian SSR, (present-day Estonia).

== Stage and screen ==
=== Stage ===
Year	Title	Role	Venue	Playwright	Ref.
1949	Ameerika hääl	Private	Eesti NSV Riiklik Vene Draamateater	Boris Lavrenyov	
1950	Anna Karenina	Officer	Eesti NSV Riiklik Vene Draamateater	Leo Tolstoy	
1950	Mašake	Viktor	Eesti NSV Riiklik Vene Draamateater	Alexander Afinogenov	
1951	Armastusega ei naljatata	Moscatel	Eesti NSV Riiklik Vene Draamateater	Pedro Calderón de la Barca	
1951	Pulmad kaasavaraga	Kurotškin		Nikolai Djakonov	
1962	Anton Šelestovi elu ja süütegu	E. Romanov and Vitka-rott	Eesti NSV Riiklik Vene Draamateater	G. Medõnski and V. Tokarev	
1970	Õhtust hommikuni	Andrei	Eesti NSV Riiklik Vene Draamateater	Viktor Rozov	

=== Filmography ===
Year	Title	Role	Notes	Ref(s)
1951	Üleliidulised purjespordi meistrivõistlused	Announcer		
1958	Esimese järgu kapten	Sailor Gavrila Titov		
1958	Teatrikevad Tallinnas	Announcer	Documentary	
1959	Nõukogude Eesti ehitab ja loob	Announcer	Documentary	
1964	10 minutit Eestis	Announcer	Documentary	
1968	Virineya	Frantz		
1970	Lyubov Yarovaya			
1971	The Ballad of Bering and His Friends		Posthumous release	
1971	Vystrel na granitse		Posthumous release	

=== Television ===
Year	Title	Role	Notes	Ref(s)
1969	Kiri tundmatule	Krall	Tallinna Televisiooni Stuudio	
