= The Secret Agent's Blunder =

- Directed by: Venyamin Dorman
- Written by: Oleg Shmelyov; Vladimir Vostokov
- Produced by: Arkady Kuslansky
- Starring: Georgiy Zhzhonov; Mikhail Nozhkin; Oleg Zhakov
- Cinematography: Mikhail Goichberg
- Release date: 7 October 1968
- Running time: 142 min
- Country: Soviet Union
- Language: Russian

The Secret Agent's Blunder (Russian: Ошибка резидента, romanized: Oshibka rezidenta), also translated as Resident's Mistake, is a 1968 (or 1966?) Soviet spy film directed by Venyamin Dorman.

It is the first of four films based around the same character, the spy Mikhail Tulyev, played by Georgy Zhzhyonov. The sequel, Secret Agent's Destiny (or Resident's Way) was released in 1970, with Resident Return (Resident Is Back) in 1982 and End of the Resident Project in 1986.

== Plot ==
=== Part one. Under Old Cover (По старой легенде) ===
Mikhail Tulyev, the son of a former spy and Russian Empire count, is sent by West German intelligence to collect Soviet nuclear secrets. He travels in Russia under the name Mikhail Zarokov, taken from a POW he had met in the Great Patriotic War, with the cover of looking for his supposedly lost sister. Tuylev stays with Dembovich (Oleg Zhakov), a bitter former German agent and works as a taxi driver, striking up a romantic relationship with the company's dispatcher, Maria Nikolayevna (Eleonora Shashkova).

Through Dembovitch, Tuylev recruits an infamous thief known as "Snipe" to smuggle his findings. However, "Snipe" is in actuality a KGB officer named Pavel Sinitsyn (Mikhail Nozhkin). Sinitsyn's superior, General Sergeyev (Yefim Kopelyan), having been informed of Tuylev's mission, orders Sinitsyn to fake his defection when he is to hand over the samples to Tuylev's contact, Leonid Krug (Vadim Zakharchenko). Subsequently, he is to act as a double agent. When the delivery happens, Pavel and Krug are attacked by a Maritime Border Troops ship. Despite Krug being shot in the leg, the two manage to escape to neutral waters.

=== Part two. Snipe's Return (Возвращение Бекаса) ===
After his successful escape with Krug into West Germany, Sinistyn is subjected to various attempted brainwashing techniques as Tuylev's superiors attempt to recruit him as an agent. Pavel is eventually accepted as an agent and sent to work as a sailor on a merchant vessel until he is called to action again. Elsewhere, Tuylev is forced to flee after a guilt-ridden Dembovich commits suicide and sends a letter to the KGB revealing Tuylev's identity and his complicity in the plot. After setting fire to Dembovitch's house, Tuylev, pursued by the KGB, switches cars, escapes, and manages to leave behind a considerable amount of money for Maria, who is pregnant with his child.

One year later, Sinistyn is ordered to return to the Soviet Union in order to resume contact with Tuylev, long since inactive and now living under the name Stanislav Kurnakov. Pavel is also asked to relay news of the death of Tuylev's father in Paris to him (In the following films, it is revealed that Tuylev's superiors orchestrated it with Tuylev's protégé Karl Brockman). After meeting with Tuylev, Sinistyn suggests to him that they go fishing the next morning. Tuylev obliges, and is apprehended by the KGB. As Tuylev is escorted away, Sergeyev then orders Sinistyn to adopt Tuylev's codename, "Hope" in order to fool his superiors to think Tuylev is still active. The ending is left ambiguous as to whether Sinistyn ever gets that chance, or whether he is crushed by the Soviet Machine.

== Cast ==
- Georgiy Zhzhonov as Mikhail Tulyev/"Hope"
- Mikhail Nozhkin as Pavel Sinitsyn/"Snipe"
- Oleg Zhakov as Dembovich
- Yefim Kopelyan as General Sergeyev
- Nikolai Prokopovich as Colonel Markov
- Eleonora Shashkova as Maria
- Vladimir Gusev as Kustov
- Irina Miroshnichenko as Rita
- Vadim Zakharchenko as Leonid Krug
- Nikolai Grabbe as Victor Krug
- Rostislav Plyatt as Kazin
- Nikolay Skorobogatov as Judge
