= Yuri Gorobets =

Soviet and Russian actor (1932–2022)

- Юрий Горобец
- Born: Yuri Vasilievich Gorobets; 15 March 1932; Ordzhonikidze, North Caucasus Krai, Russian SFSR, USSR
- Died: 27 June 2022 (aged 90); Moscow, Russia
- Occupation: Actor
- Awards: People's Artist of the Russian Federation (1993)

Yuri Vasilievich Gorobets (Russian: Юрий Васильевич Горобец; 15 March 1932 – 27 June 2022) was a Soviet and Russian theater and cinema actor. People's Artist of the Russian Federation (1993). Laureate of the State Prize of the USSR (1984).

He was awarded Order of Friendship (2003) and Order of Honour (2007).

== Selected filmography ==
- Striped Trip (1961) as militiaman
- At Your Threshold (1962) as Perekalin
- Come Tomorrow, Please... (1963) as Kostya
- Day by Day (1971–72) as Konstantin Yakushev
- Investigation Held by ZnaToKi (1975) as Medvedev
- Air Crew (1980) as Misha, dispatcher
- Do Not Marry, Girls (1985) as minister
- Water Thieves (1993) as Sarafanych
