= A Taiga Story =

- Russian: Таёжная повесть
- Directed by: Vladimir Fetin
- Written by: Viktor Astafyev; Albina Shulgina
- Starring: Yevgeny Kindinov; Mikhail Kononov; Svetlana Smekhnova
- Release date: 1979
- Running time: 99 minute
- Country: Soviet Union
- Language: Russian

A Taiga Story (Russian: Таёжная повесть) is a 1979 Soviet romantic drama film directed by Vladimir Fetin.

The film tells about the taiga hunter Akim, who meets a dying girl and decides to save her. Having regained consciousness, she falls in love with Akim, but they are too different.

== Plot ==
In the winter, Akim takes a job as a hunter on the Ende River. Upon arriving at the winter hunting cabin in the remote taiga, he discovers a seriously ill, emaciated girl named Ela from Moscow. She had ended up there after agreeing to let Georgy Gertsev (nicknamed Goga), a free-spirited individualist and womanizer, escort her to her father’s expedition. Goga had left to go fishing, intending to test a new lure crafted from a war medal he had traded from a veteran for a bottle of port. However, a massive fish dragged Goga, causing him to slip, hit his head on a rock, and die.

Akim takes care of Ela, postponing his hunting work until she recovers. Ela, unaccustomed to survival outside civilization, proves to be demanding and somewhat helpless, though she tries to assist Akim. As they realize they will have to survive together for several months until the next helicopter arrives, they come to understand their mutual dependency. Soon, their food supplies are destroyed by a wolverine that breaks into the cabin. Realizing that the approaching winter will bring severe cold and make survival even harder, Akim decides to take a risky course of action — heading to find people.

They embark on a journey across fifty kilometers to a fishing village, only to find it abandoned. Ela falls into despair, but Akim calms her down and lights a signal fire to attract attention from a passing plane. Eventually, a helicopter arrives and rescues them from the deep taiga. Ela spends seven days in a local hospital due to a doctor’s recommendation not to travel immediately, while Akim recovers using traditional forest remedies. Before Ela boards her plane, she and Akim experience an emotional farewell, and he gives her Goga’s wedding ring wrapped in a five-ruble note.

== Cast ==
- Yevgeny Kindinov as Goga Gertsev
- Mikhail Kononov as Akim
- Svetlana Smekhnova as Elya
