= Inna Tumanyan =

Soviet director and screenwriter of feature films and newsreels

- Born: 10 September 1929; Moscow, USSR
- Died: 10 January 2005 (aged 75); Moscow, Russia
- Occupation: Film director
- Years active: 1966-1988

Inna Tumanyan (Armenian: Իննա Թումանյան; 10 September 1929 — 10 January 2005) was a Soviet-Armenian film director. She directed seven films including When I Will Become a Giant.
