= Valentina Vladimirova =

- Валентина Владимирова
- Born: Valentina Kharlampiyevna Vladimirova; November 22, 1927; Vasylivka
- Died: March 23, 1994 (aged 66); Moscow
- Resting place: Vagankovo Cemetery; Moscow
- Years active: 1955—1992
- Spouse: Valery Vladimirov
- Awards: Honored Artist of the RSFSR (1969)

Valentina Kharlampiyevna Vladimirova (Russian: Валентина Харлампиевна Владимирова; 22 November 1927 – 23 March 1994) was a Ukrainian-born Russian actress. She performed in more than forty films from 1957 to 1992.

== Selected filmography ==
Film
| Year | Title | Role | Notes |
|---|---|---|---|
| 1977 | White Bim Black Ear | woman | |
| 1974 | Earthly Love | Nina Ivanovna, secretary | |
| 1972 | The Last Day | mother | |
| 1971 | Grandads-Robbers | Maria Tikhonovna Vorobyovа | |
| 1971 | Hail, Mary! | mother Mary | |
| 1968 | Three Days of Viktor Chernyshov | Katerina | |
| 1967 | Stewardess | scandalous passenger | |
| 1966 | Don't Forget... Lugovaya Station | Maria Agafonovna | |
| 1965 | They're Calling, Open the Door | watchman in theater | |
| 1964 | The Chairman | Polina Korshikova | |
| 1964 | Don Tale | Frosya | |
| 1962 | Nevermore | Masha | |
| 1960 | Resurrection | prisoner | |
| 1957 | The Cranes Are Flying | woman soldier | |
| 1956 | Sasha Enters Life | Pozdnyakova | |
