= Yevgeny Kindinov =

Russian actor (born 1945)

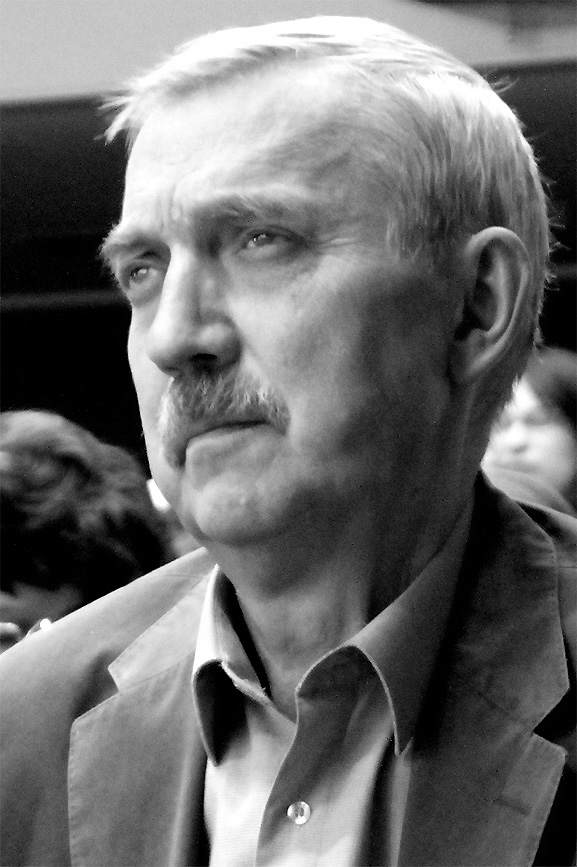
Kindinov in 2011

Yevgeny Arsenievich Kindinov (Russian: Евгений Арсеньевич Киндинов; born 24 May 1945) is a Russian theatre and film actor. He spent his entire professional career at the Moscow Art Theatre, and, after the theater was split in 1987, at the Chekhov Moscow Art Theatre. He is a People's Artist of Russia.

== Selected filmography ==
- Dead Season (1968) as Soviet intelligence officer
- Punisher (1968) as Vangelis
- A Lover's Romance (1974) as Sergei Nikitin
- Mama, I'm Alive (1976) as Viktor Glunsky
- A Taiga Story (1979) as Goga Gertsev
- The Suicide Club, or the Adventures of a Titled Person (1981) as Simon Rolls
- The Blonde Around the Corner (1983) as store clerk (voice)
- Children of the Arbat (2004) as Lev Kamenev
- Adjutants of Love (2005) as Rene, a monk templar
