= Lyudmila Chursina =

Soviet and Russian actress (1941–2026)

- Людмила Чурсина
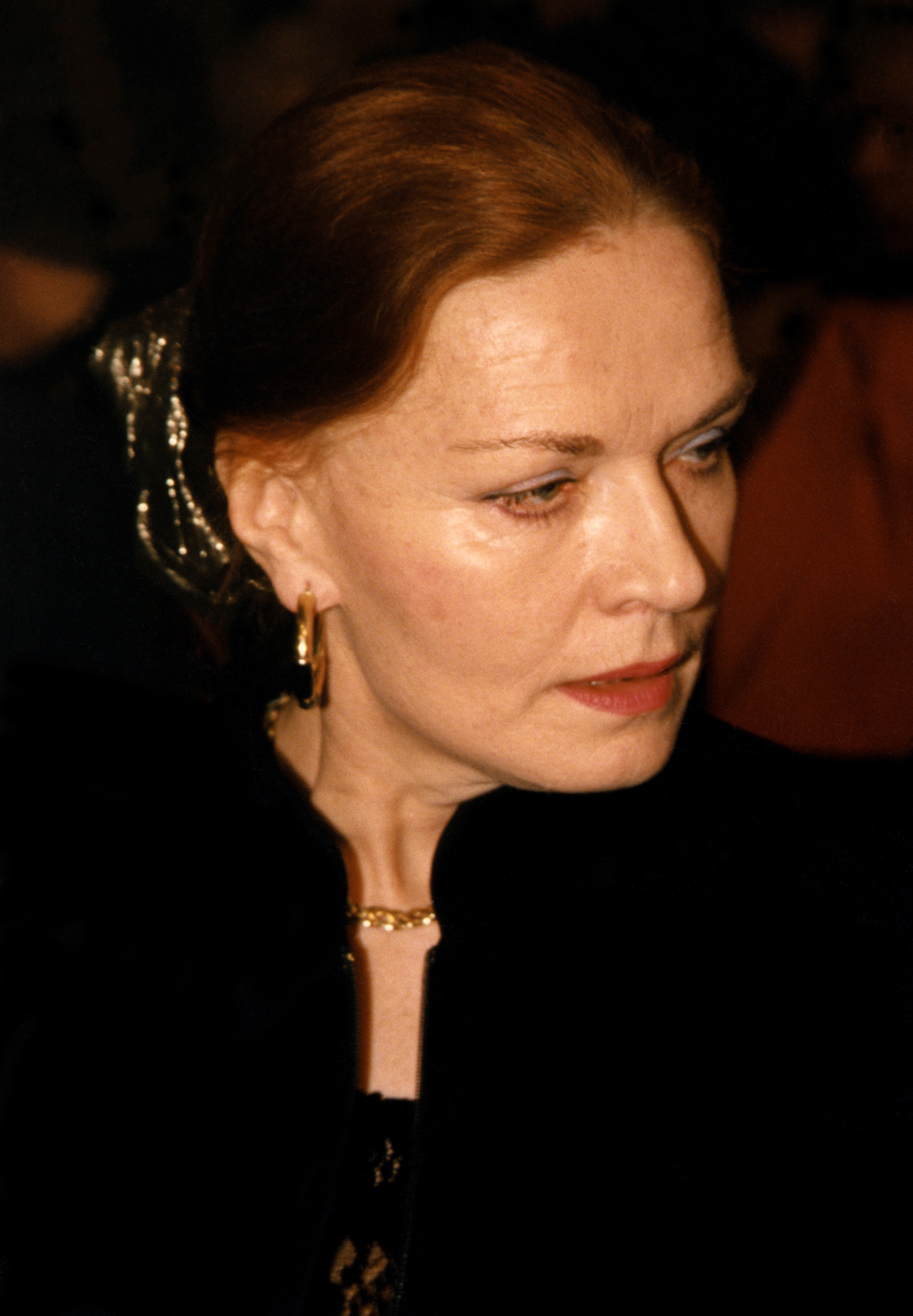
- Chursina in 1998
- Born: 20 July 1941; Stalinabad, Tajik SSR, Soviet Union
- Died: 10 June 2026 (aged 84)
- Occupation: Actress
- Years active: 1961–2026
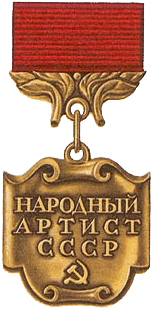
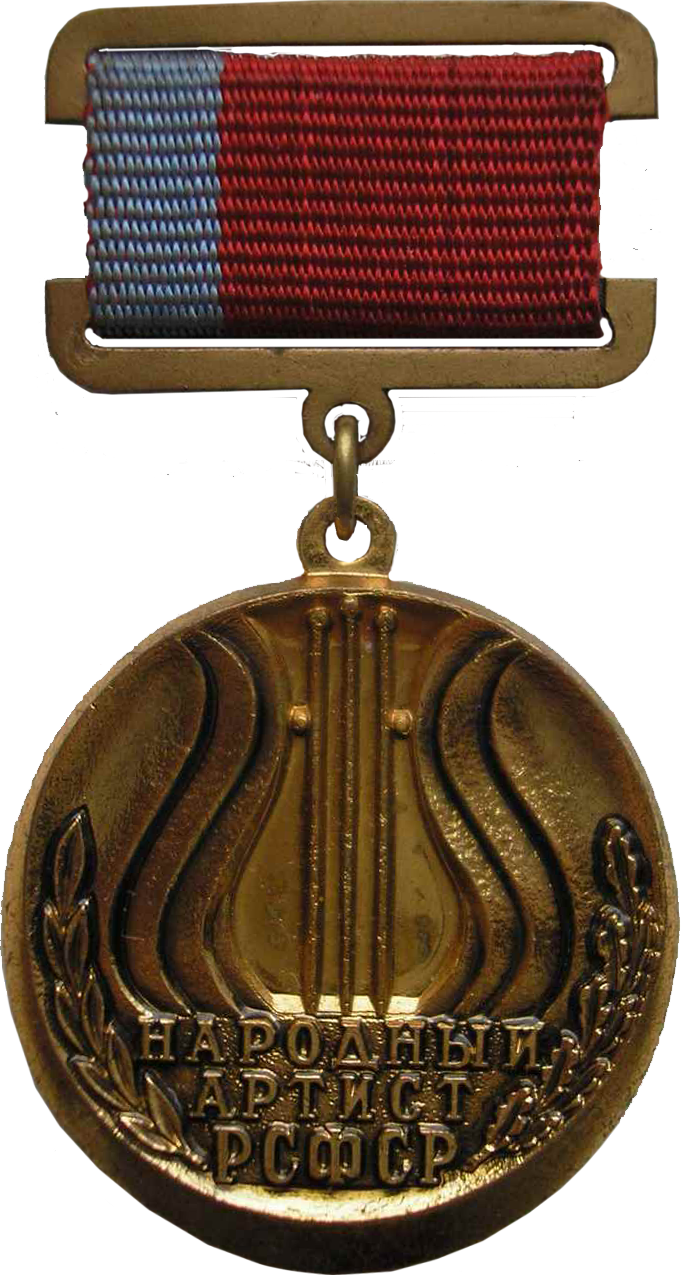
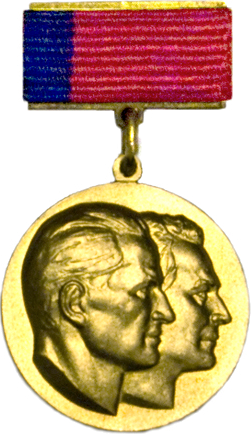
- Awards

Lyudmila Alexeyevna Chursina (Russian: Людмила Алексеевна Чурсина; 20 July 1941 – 10 June 2026) was a Soviet and Russian film actress. She appeared in more than 50 films and television shows since 1962. In 1981 she was a member of the jury at the 12th Moscow International Film Festival. At the age of 40, she was the youngest actress to receive the title of the People's Artist of the USSR.

On 11 March 2014, she supported 2014 annexation of Crimea by signing the collective petition to the Russian public "Culture figures of Russia – support of President Putin's position about Ukraine and Crimea".

Chursina died on 10 June 2026, at the age of 84. She died of a long-term cancerous disease.

== Selected filmography ==
- When the Trees Were Tall (1961) as Zoya
- Don Tale (1964) as Darya
- Two Tickets for a Daytime Picture Show (1966) as Inka
- The Andromeda Nebula (1967) as Louma Lasvi
- Virineya (1968) as Virineya
- A Little Crane (1968) as Marfa
- The Adjutant of His Excellency (1969) as Oksana
- Goya or the Hard Way to Enlightenment (1971) as Pepa
- Olesya (1971) as Olesya
- How Czar Peter the Great Married Off His Moor (1976) as Catherine I of Russia
- Primary Russia (1985) as Aneya
- Orlova and Alexandrov (2015) as Yevgenia Nikolaevna
