= List of Soviet films of 1977 =

== 1977 ==
Title	Russian title	Director	Cast	Genre	Notes
1977
About the Little Red Riding Hood	Про Красную Шапочку	Leonid Nechayev	Yana Poplavskaya	Musical, Fantasy	
Almanzor's Rings	Кольца Альманзора	Igor Voznesensky	Svetlana Smirnova	Action	
Armed and Dangerous	Вооружён и очень опасен	Vladimir Vajnshtok	Donatas Banionis, Mircea Veroiu, Lyudmila Senchina	Western	
The Ascent	Восхождение	Larisa Shepitko	Boris Plotnikov, Vladimir Gostyukhin	War drama	Won the Golden Bear at the Berlin IFF
Bag of the Collector	Сумка инкассатора	Augusto Baltrušaitis	Georgi Burkov	Drama	
Birthday	День рождения	Haji Ismayilov	Rasim Ojagov	Musical	
Call Me from Afar	Позови меня в даль светлую	German Lavrov, Stanislav Lyubshin	Lidiya Fedoseeva-Shukshina	Drama	
Certificate of poverty	Свидетельство о бедности				
Confusion of Feelings	Смятение чувств	Pavel Arsenov	Elena Proklova	Drama	
A Declaration of Love	Объяснение в любви	Ilya Averbakh	Ewa Szykulska	Romance	
Destiny	Судьба	Yevgeny Matveyev	Olga Ostroumova, Yevgeny Matveyev, Yury Yakovlev, Irina Skobtseva	War drama	
Fourth Height	Четвёртая высота	Igor Voznesensky	Margarita Sergeyecheva	Drama	
Front Beyond the Front Line	Фронт за линией фронта	Igor Gostev	Vyacheslav Tikhonov	War	
Funny People	Смешные люди!	Mikhail Shveitser	Oleg Basilashvili	Comedy	
Hatred	Ненависть	Samvel Gasparov	Yevgeni Solyakov, Ivan Matskevich	Action	
How Ivanushka the Fool Travelled in Search of Wonder	Как Иванушка-дурачок за чудом ходил	Nadezhda Kosheverova	Oleg Dahl	Fantasy	
Incognito from St. Petersburg	Инкогнито из Петербурга	Leonid Gayday	Anatoliy Papanov, Sergey Migitsko, Nonna Mordyukova	Comedy	
Love at First Sight	Любовь с первого взгляда	Rezo Esadze	Vakhtang Panchulidze	Romantic Comedy	
Ma-ma	Мама	Elisabeta Bostan	Lyudmila Gurchenko, Mikhail Boyarsky, Oleg Popov, Saveliy Kramarov, George Mihaita, Florian Pittiş	Musical	Joint France-Romania-USSR film
Marriage	Женитьба	Vitaly Melnikov	Svetlana Kryuchkova	Comedy	
Mimino	Мимино	Georgi Daneliya	Vakhtang Kikabidze, Frunzik Mkrtchyan, Yevgeny Leonov	Comedy	Won the Golden Prize at the 10th Moscow International Film Festival
Mustached Nanny	Усатый нянь	Vladimir Grammatikov, Lyudmila Shagalova, Elizaveta Uvarova	Sergei Prokhanov, Lyudmila Shagalova, Elizaveta Uvarova	Comedy	
Newcomer	Приезжая	Valeriy Lonskoy	Zhanna Prokhorenko, Yelena Ikonitskaya, Aleksandr Mikhaylov, Sergei Ponachevny, Yelena Kuzmina	Drama	
Night Over Chile	Ночь над Чили	Sebastián Alarcón, Aleksandr Kosarev	Olegar Fedoro, Grigore Grigoriu, Nartai Begalin	Drama	Entered into the 10th Moscow International Film Festival
The Nose	Нос	Rolan Bykov	Rolan Bykov, Zinaida Slavina, Iya Savvina, Zinaida Sharko, Elena Sanayeva, Borislav Brondukov	Drama	
Office Romance	Служебный роман	Eldar Ryazanov	Andrey Myagkov, Alisa Freindlich	Comedy	
On Thursday and Never Again	В четверг и больше никогда	Anatoly Efros	Lyubov Dobrzhanskaya	Drama	
One-Two, Soldiers Were Going...	Аты-баты, шли солдаты...	Leonid Bykov	Leonid Bykov, Vladimir Konkin	War film	
Polygon	Полигон	Anatoly Petrov	Vsevolod Yakut, Oleg Mokshantsev, Alexander Beliavsky, Anatoly Kuznetsov	Animation	
Practical Joke	Poзыгрыш	Vladimir Menshov	Dmitry Kharatyan, Yevgeniya Khanayeva, Natalya Vavilova, Andrey Gusev, Zinovy Gerdt, Oleg Tabakov	Romantic drama	
The Princess on a Pea	Принцесса на горошине	Boris Rytsarev	Irina Malysheva	Fantasy	
Rudin	Рудин	Konstantin Voinov	Oleg Yefremov	Romance	
The Scarlet Flower	Аленький цветочек	Irina Povolotskaya	Marina Ilyichyova	Fantasy	
The Second Attempt of Viktor Krokhin	Вторая попытка Виктора Крохина	Igor Sheshukov	Aleksandr Kharashkevich	Drama	
Sentimental Romance	Сентиментальный роман	Igor Maslennikov	Elena Proklova, Yelena Koreneva, Nikolai Denisov, Stanislav Lyubshin, Sergey Migitsko	Romantic drama	Entered into the 27th Berlin International Film Festival
Soldiers of Freedom	Солдаты свободы	Yuri Ozerov	Mikhail Ulyanov, Yevgeny Matveyev, Vasily Lanovoy	War film	
Stepan's Remembrance	Степанова памятка	Konstantin Yershov	Larisa Chikurova, Gennady Yegorov, Natalya Andrejchenko	Fantasy	
The Steppe	Степь	Sergei Bondarchuk	Oleg Kuznetsov	Drama	
A Strange Woman	Странная женщина	Yuli Raizman	Irina Kupchenko	Drama	
Sweet Woman	Сладкая женщина	Vladimir Fetin	Natalya Gundareva, Oleg Yankovsky, Pyotr Velyaminov, Rimma Markova, Nina Alisova	Drama	
Trouble	Беда	Dinara Asanova	Aleksey Petrenko	Drama	
An Unfinished Piece for Mechanical Piano	Неоконченная пьеса для механического пианино	Nikita Mikhalkov	Alexander Kalyagin, Elena Solovei, Evgeniya Glushenko	Drama	
Untypical Story	Трясина	Grigory Chukhray	Nonna Mordyukova	Drama	
Vasilisa the Beautiful	Василиса Прекрасная	Vladimir Pekar	Yevgeny Leonov, Mikhail Kononov, Anna Kamenkova	Animation	
White Bim Black Ear	Белый Бим Чёрное ухо	Stanislav Rostotsky	Vyacheslav Tikhonov	Drama	
The Wishing Tree	Древо желания	Tengiz Abuladze	Sofiko Chiaureli, Ramaz Chkhikvadze	Drama	
Wounded Game	Подранки	Nikolai Gubenko	Juozas Budraitis, Alexander Kalyagin, Zhanna Bolotova, Rolan Bykov, Bukhuti Zaqariadze, Evgeni Evstigneev	Drama	Entered into the 1977 Cannes Film Festival
Wrong Connection	Обратная связь	Viktor Tregubovich	Oleg Yankovsky	Drama	
Sunday Night	Воскресная Ночь	Viktor Turov		Drama	
