= Aleksandr Misharin (screenwriter) =

Russian poet, screenwriter and writer

- Born: Aleksandr Misharin; 6 April 1939; Moscow, USSR
- Died: 13 April 2008 (aged 69); Moscow, Russia
- Occupations: Screenwriter, playwright, writer
- Years active: 1959—2008

Aleksandr Nikolaevich Misharin (Russian: Александр Николаевич Мишарин), also known in English as Alexander Misharin (born 6 April 1939 — died 13 April 2008), was a Soviet - Russian screenwriter, playwright, novelist, actor and senior editor of Russian periodicals. An Honored Artist of the Russian Federation (2000), he was a close friend of Andrei Tarkovsky with whom he wrote several screenplays, including Tarkovsky's celebrated masterpiece Mirror.

== Biography ==
Aleksandr Misharin was born in Moscow, Russian SFSR into a mixed Russian-German family. His father served in the military. In 1960 Misharin graduated from the Mikhail Shchepkin Higher Theatre School, and in 1962 he finished the Advanced Course for Screenwriters and Film Directors at VGIK. He met Andrei Veytsler while studying at the Shchepkin's drama school. Also a descendant of a noble Russian-German family, Veytsler turned into his regular collaborator for many years. Together they wrote their first dramatic poem A Song of Wind (1959) for the Maly Theatre, as well as other plays such as Hamlet from the Flat № 13 (1961), Winter Ballad (1970), Livelong Day (1973), One Yard Chronicles (1978) and others.

After attending the institute both of them were sent to work for the Youth Theater in Tver. One of their plays — Dangerous Silence (1963) — was noticed by Nikolay Okhlopkov who made it into a critically acclaimed stage play for the Mayakovsky Theatre, with Misharin performing in one of the minor roles. In addition they produced a number of screenplays and radio plays. The 1977 family comedy Mustached Nanny directed by Vladimir Grammatikov became one of the Soviet box office leaders. It was released shortly after Veytsler's sudden death in 1975. Misharin continued to work alone. His most successful solo play was Silver Wedding (1985) which was staged by Oleg Yefremov at the Moscow Art Theatre. The play gained enormous success at the time of release, and for many people it marked the beginning of new times, or perestroika.

In 1964 Misharin became acquainted with Andrei Tarkovsky who happened to be his neighbor. They soon became good friends. In due course they would collaborate (in 1968) on the writing of a screenplay for a film which would eventually receive the title Mirror (originally it was entitled A White, White Day) which, according to Misharin, was finished in just two weeks. Tarkovsky would not be given permission to direct the screenplay until 1974. In the meantime he made the much acclaimed science fiction film Solaris that featured Misharin in the episodic role. Mirror was finally made in 1974, with Misharin playing another small part. It became the director's landmark work regularly listed among the greatest movies of world cinema. Tarkovsky and Misharin worked on several other screenplays, including Sardor (1978) and a biographical film about Fyodor Dostoyevsky, although most of them weren't screened for various reasons described in Tarkovsky's diaries.

Misharin was critical of his friend's decision to leave the country which he called a 'creative mistake' influenced by the overrated expectations of his second wife Larisa Tarkovskaya whom he described as mentally unstable and blamed for manipulating her husband. According to Misharin, Tarkovsky actually planned a divorce shortly before the emigration happened, but Larisa convinced him not only to stay with her, but also to stay in Europe.

A member of the Union of Soviet Writers since 1967. As a writer he published several novels, including Ruined City Guide (the 1960s), Career (1989), White, White Day (2003) and The Voice (2005). In 1990 he was appointed as a chief editor of the Sunday magazine, and in 1991 he headed the New Russia magazine (formerly known as Sovetsky Soyuz, closed in just a year).

Aleksandr Misharin died on April 13, 2008. He was buried at the Troyekurovskoye Cemetery.

== Filmography ==
=== Writer ===
Year	Title	Original title	
Year	Title	Original title	Notes
1966	Grey Illness	Серая болезнь	
1970	Chermeni	Чермен	also known as Tsermen
1970	Winter Ballad	Зимняя баллада	TV play
1973	Nastenka	Настенька	short
1975	Mirror	Зеркало	also actor (doctor)
1976	My Business	Моё дело	
1977	Mustached Nanny	Усатый нянь	
1978	Sardor	Сардор	
1980	Horses Aren't Changed at the Crossing	Коней на переправе не меняют	
1981	February Wind	Февральский ветер	
1983	Towards His Own Kind	К своим!	
1983	Five Conversations with the Son	Пять разговоров с сыном	TV play
1986	Equals Four Frances	Равняется четырём Франциям	TV play
1988	Due to the Change of Job	В связи с переходом на другую работу	

=== Actor ===
Year	Title	Original title	Role	Notes
1972	Solaris	Солярис	Shanakhan, predsedatel komissii Anri Bertona	
1975	Mirror	Зеркало	Doctor	Uncredited, (final film role)
