= Early Joys =

- Russian: Первые радости
- Directed by: Vladimir Basov
- Written by: Konstantin Fedin (novel); Aleksei Kapler
- Starring: Mikhail Nazvanov; Vladimir Druzhnikov; Vladimir Yemelyanov; Viktor Korshunov; Tatyana Konyukhova
- Cinematography: Timofey Lebeshev
- Edited by: Antonina Medvedeva
- Music by: Mikhail Ziv
- Production company: Mosfilm
- Release date: 1956
- Running time: 103 min.
- Country: Soviet Union
- Language: Russian

Early Joys (Russian: Первые радости, romanized: Pervye radosti, literally First Joys) is a 1956 Soviet drama film directed by Vladimir Basov.

The film, set in 1910, follows a young revolutionary who endures imprisonment, personal loss, and exile as he refuses to betray his comrades in the fight for justice and freedom.

== Plot ==
Kirill Izvekov, a student at a technical college, is secretly involved with an underground revolutionary organization led by Pyotr Ragozin. Kirill keeps his revolutionary activities hidden from his mother and his girlfriend, Liza Meshkova. However, the police begin tracking the underground group, and Kirill is arrested. Colonel Polotentsev of the gendarmerie attempts to extract a confession about Ragozin’s whereabouts, but Kirill remains silent. Polotentsev expands his search, involving the writer Pastukhov and the dockworker Parabukin. He also interrogates Ragozin's wife, Ksenia, who gives birth to a child in prison but dies without revealing any information.

Meanwhile, Liza’s father, the merchant Meshkov, forces her into marriage with a wealthy businessman, Viktor Shubnikov, after learning of Kirill's arrest. Despite becoming Shubnikov's wife, Liza cannot forget Kirill. Undeterred by brutal beatings, Kirill refuses to betray his comrades, ensuring Ragozin's safety. Eventually, Kirill is sentenced to exile in Siberia along with other political prisoners.

== Cast ==
- Viktor Korshunov as Izvekov
- Mikhail Nazvanov as Pastukhov
- Vladimir Druzhnikov as Tsvetukhin
- Vladimir Yemelyanov as Ragozin
- Tatyana Konyukhova as Liza
- Roza Makagonova as Anna
- Daniil Ilchenko as Old Man
- Boris Novikov as Shubnikov
- Nina Menshikova as Ksana Ragozina
- Yury Yakovlev as Dibich
- Olga Zhiznyeva as Isvekova

== See also ==
- An Unusual Summer (1957)
