= Zone of Lyube =

- Russian: Зона Любэ
- Directed by: Dmitry Zolotukhin
- Written by: Dmitriy Zolotukhin
- Produced by: Igor Matvienko; Oleg Sidorov; Dmitry Zolotukhin
- Starring: Marina Levtova; Nikolay Rastorguyev; Fyodor Sukhov; Sergey Sazontyev; Irina Rozanova
- Cinematography: Oleg Martynov
- Edited by: Yelena Taraskina
- Music by: Igor Matvienko
- Production companies: Gorky Film Studio; White Wind
- Release date: 1994
- Running time: 76 min.
- Country: Russia
- Language: Russian

Zone of Lyube (Russian: Зона Любэ, romanized: Zona Lyube) is a 1994 Russian musical drama film directed by Dmitry Zolotukhin.

== Plot ==
The film shows a concert of the Lyube group in zones and prisons, the audience of which are prisoners, security guards, men, women and teenagers, each song of which becomes someone's personal fate.

== Cast ==
- Marina Levtova as Lena, journalist
- Nikolay Rastorguyev as cameo
- Fyodor Sukhov as Sedoy
- Sergey Sazontyev as major
- Irina Rozanova as a prisoner's wife
- Andrey Podoshian as Gypsy (elder brother)
- Valery Garkalin as Silnyy
- Aleksey Serebryakov as Andrey Egorov
- Marina Golub as Ozornaya
- Yevgeny Vesnik as Rynochnik
- Natalya Khorokhorina as Lukavaya
- Vladimir Kashpur as prisoner

== Critical response ==
The film became an important milestone in the history of the group. At the same time, Andrei Titov, in his review for Iskusstvo Kino, wrote that the debutant director acted uncertainly, and called the dramatic component of the film “helpless”.

== Soundtrack ==
The film features the following songs from the group's discography:

1. "White Swan" (Белый лебедь, features an edited, shorter arrangement from the studio track)
2. "The Orphan of Kazan" (Сирота Казанская)
3. "Horse" (Конь, features an alternate arrangement from the studio track)
4. "Moon" (Луна)
5. "Out in the Wild" (На воле)
6. "Little Sister" (Младшая сестрёнка)
7. "Keep rocking" (Давай-наяривай, originally from the previous album of the group - "Who said we lived badly?..", 1992)
8. "Forgive me, mother" (Ты прости меня, мама)
9. "Finale" (later part of "Out in the Wild")
10. "The Road" (Дорога)

The composer for all tracks is Igor Matvienko. The lyricists are Alexander Shaganov (3, 6-8, 10), Mikhail Andreev (1, 5, 8) and Vladimir Baranov (2).
