= Behind the Footlights =

- Russian: На подмостках сцены
- Directed by: Konstantin Yudin
- Written by: Nikolay Erdman; Dmitri Lensky; Mikhail Volpin
- Starring: Vasiliy Merkurev; Liliya Yudina; Tatyana Karpova; Nikolai Afanasyev
- Cinematography: Igor Gelein; Valentin Zakharov
- Edited by: Anna Kulganek
- Music by: Vasiliy Shirinskiy
- Release date: 1956
- Running time: 89 minute
- Country: Soviet Union
- Language: Russian

Behind the Footlights (Russian: На подмостках сцены) is a 1956 Soviet musical comedy drama film directed by Konstantin Yudin.

== Plot ==
The film tells about an elderly actor and his beautiful and gifted daughter, who dreams of becoming an actress and playing in the theater.

== Cast ==
- Vasili Merkuryev as Lev Gurych Sinichkin (as V. Merkuryev)
- Liliya Yudina as Liza - Sinichkin daughter (as L. Yudina)
- Tatyana Karpova as Surmilova, actress (as T. Karpova)
- Nikolai Afanasyev as Prince Vetrinsky (as N. Afanasyev)
- Mikhail Yanshin as Borzikov, dramatist (as M. Yanshin)
- Yuri Lyubimov as Prince Zefirov (as Yu. Lyubimov)
- Sergei Blinnikov as Pustoslavtsev, theatre keeper (as S. Blinnikov)
- Stanislav Chekan as Stepan, coachman (as S. Chekan)
- Aleksandr Sashin-Nikolsky as Prompter (as A. Samin-Nikolsky)
- Yelena Savitskaya
- Irina Fyodorova
- Grigori Abrikosov
- Pyotr Repnin
- Yury Yakovlev as Chakhotkin (as Yu. Yakovlev)
- Nikolay Kutuzov
- V. Troshuk
