= Lebeshev =

Lebeshev (Cyrillic: Лебешев) is a Russian masculine surname, its feminine counterpart is Lebesheva. The surname may refer to the following notable people:

- Darya Lebesheva (born 1995), Belarusian tennis player
- Pavel Lebeshev (1940—2003), Russian cinematographer
- Timofey Lebeshev (1905—1981), Soviet cinematographer, father of Pavel
