= Corps of General Shubnikov =

- Russian: Корпус генерала Шубникова
- Directed by: Damir Vyatich-Berezhnykh
- Written by: Vladimir Baskakov; Kirill Rapoport
- Starring: Anatoliy Vasilev; Viktor Korshunov; Evgeniy Leonov-Gladyshev; Marina Yakovleva; Sergei Prokhanov
- Cinematography: Anatoli Nikolayev
- Music by: Mikhail Ziv
- Release date: 1980
- Running time: 89 minute
- Country: Soviet Union
- Language: Russian

Corps of General Shubnikov (Russian: Корпус генерала Шубникова, romanized: Korpus generala Shubnikova) is a 1980 Soviet World War II film directed by Damir Vyatich-Berezhnykh.

== Plot ==
In the winter of 1942, a new Soviet mechanized corps is formed under the command of Major General Shubnikov, tasked with a strategic mission to disrupt German operations. At the same time, Hitler orders four tank divisions from the Velikiye Luki–Rzhev region to reinforce General Paulus, whose army is encircled by Soviet forces near Stalingrad. The Soviet high command assigns Shubnikov a high-stakes mission: to break through German defenses with a powerful, sudden assault, creating the appearance of a major Soviet offensive. This ruse is intended to force the German reserves earmarked for Stalingrad to engage, thus hindering the transfer of reinforcements and forestalling Field Marshal Manstein's plans to relieve Paulus’s trapped forces.

After accomplishing the breakthrough and raiding the enemy's rear lines, Shubnikov organizes a tactical retreat to reconnect with the main Soviet forces. Infantry units fight their way through rough terrain towards the village of Karpukhino, with artillery support, while tank groups move through the Kuzmichi settlement. They are forced to abandon transport vehicles and destroy artillery, carrying only small arms, mortars, and wounded soldiers on stretchers. Meanwhile, the narrative also follows Senior Lieutenant Maltsev, a dedicated officer under Shubnikov’s command since the war began, who, after hospital recovery, is reassigned as a station commander in the rear but seeks to rejoin the newly formed corps. On his first day, Maltsev is captured by a German reconnaissance team while traveling on his motorcycle. Wounded and interrogated, he refuses to cooperate and deliberately misleads the Germans, falsely claiming to belong to a cavalry unit, preferring death over betrayal.

== Cast ==
- Anatoliy Vasilev
- Viktor Korshunov
- Evgeniy Leonov-Gladyshev
- Marina Yakovleva
- Sergei Prokhanov
- Pyotr Shcherbakov
- Aleksey Eybozhenko
- Vladimir Puchkov
- Stanislav Stankevich
- Pauls Butkevics
