= An Unusual Summer =

- Russian: Необыкновенное лето
- Directed by: Vladimir Basov
- Written by: Aleksei Kapler
- Starring: Viktor Korshunov; Roza Makagonova; Vladimir Yemelyanov; Mikhail Nazvanov; Yury Yakovlev
- Cinematography: Timofey Lebeshev
- Edited by: Antonina Medvedeva
- Music by: Mikhail Ziv
- Production company: Mosfilm
- Release date: 1957
- Running time: 103 min.
- Country: Soviet Union
- Language: Russian

An Unusual Summer (Russian: Необыкновенное лето, romanized: Neobyknovennoye leto) is a 1957 Soviet drama film directed by Vladimir Basov, the sequel to Early Joys.

== Plot ==
The film takes place in 1919 in Saratov. Student Kirill Izvekov becomes Commissioner of the Red Army and participates in the battle with Wrangel and the capture of the city.

== Cast ==
- Viktor Korshunov as Kirill Izvekov
- Roza Makagonova as Anochka
- Vladimir Yemelyanov as Ragosyn
- Mikhail Nazvanov as Pastukhov
- Yury Yakovlev as Dybych
- Yevgeny Teterin as Dorogomilov
- Vladimir Druzhnikov as Tsvetukhin
- Georgi Georgiu as Oznobishin
- Afanasi Kochetkov as sailor Strashnov
- Tatyana Konyukhova as Liza Meshkova
- Nikolai Kryukov as chairman
- Boris Novikov as Viktor Shubnikov
- Gleb Strizhenov as Ipat Ipatiev
- Valentina Ushakova as Asya Pastukhova
- Olga Zhiznyeva as Vera Izvekova

== Release ==
Vladimir Basov's film was watched by 21.9 million viewers, which is the 815th place in the entire history of the Soviet film distribution.
