= Natalya Khorokhorina =

Soviet actress

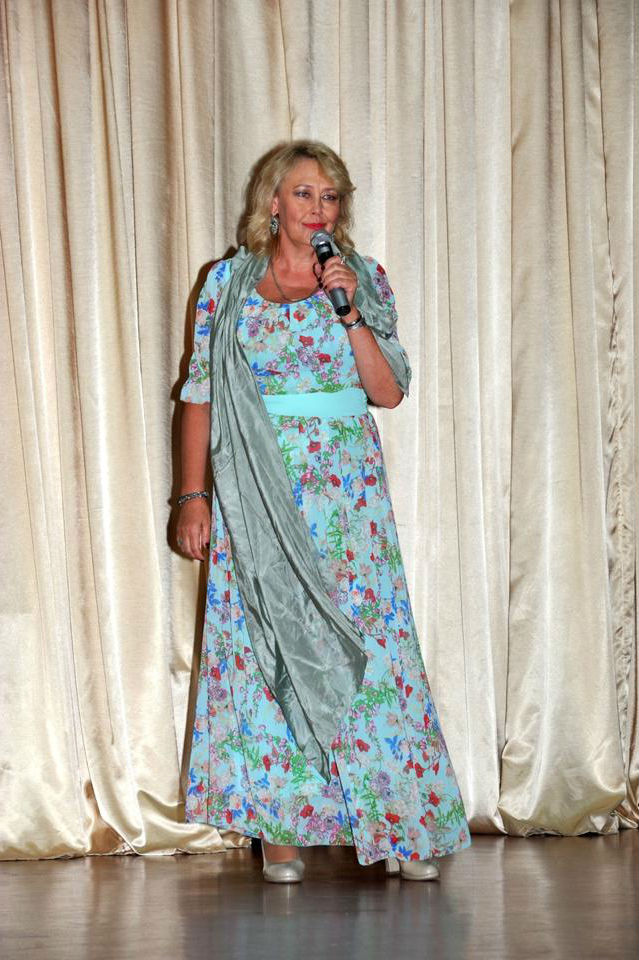
- Born: Natalya Nikolaevna Khorokhorina; 5 May 1954 (age 72); Vnukovo, Moscow Oblast, RSFSR, USSR
- Occupation: actress
- Years active: 1976 – present
- Awards: (2004)

Natalya Nikolaevna Khorokhorina (Russian: Ната́лья Николаевна Хорохо́рина; Kharakhorina (Russian: Харахорина); born in 1954) is a Soviet and Russian film and stage actress.

== Biography ==
Natalya Nikolaevna Khorokhorina was born May 5, 1954, at the farm near the village of Moscow Vnukovo in Moscow region in a working-class family.

As a schoolgirl, Natasha attended drama school at the Pioneers Palace.

After high school, Natalya spent a year on self-education and additional documents filed immediately and Boris Shchukin Theatre Institute, and Mikhail Shchepkin Higher Theatre School. She was accepted into both. She chose the Shchepkin School, and graduated in 1976, course of Viktor Korshunov.

After graduation from the school, Natalia worked in the theaters Moscow Chamber Troupe, The Ark, Sphere.

Natalia Khorokhorina also played at the Moscow Mayakovsky Theatre. In the Moscow theater Sphere, Horohorina served eleven years. Her acting debut in cinema was in the drama of Georgiy Kalatozishvili Cafe Isotope in 1976.

During her career she played mostly supporting roles and has about 90 credits in cinema. Popularity to the actress came after playing in the movie Pirates of the 20th Century (1980).

Notable films with her participation include Mustached Nanny (1977), White Dew (1983), Unknown Soldier (1984), Entrance to the Labyrinth (1989), Zone of Lyube (1994), Demobbed (2000), The Spanish Voyage of Stepanich (2006) and television series Voronin's Family (2009-2014).

In 2004 she received the title of Honoured Artist of Russia.

== Personal life ==
Natalia first married when she was a student, but soon divorced.

Her second husband was Vladimir Sobolev, she married him in the beginning of the 1990s. In 1992, their daughter Anya was born. They divorced in the early 2000s.

== Selected filmography ==
- 1976 — Traitor as teacher-educator
- 1977 — Mustached Nanny as Mom
- 1979 — Father and Son as Anna
- 1979 — Pirates of the 20th Century as Masha
- 1981 — Express on Fire as Vera
- 1982 — Fairy tales... fairy tales... fairy tales of the old Arbat as episode
- 1983 — White Dew as Vera
- 1987 — Dark Eyes as the lady from the suite
- 1989 — Entrance to the Labyrinth as Ekaterina Pachkalina
- 1994 — Zone of Lyube as Lukavaya
- 1996 — Love in Russian 2 as governor's secretary
- 2000 — Demobbed as mother
- 2000 — The Envy of Gods as administrator of movie theatre
- 2010 — Our Russia. The Balls of Fate as Larisa's mother
- 2013/14 — Daddy's Daughters as manager
- 2009/14 — Voronin's Family as aunt Anya
