= Vengerovsky (disambiguation) =

Vengerovsky may refer to:

== People ==
- Boris Vengerovsky (born 1931), Russian engineer
- Yury Vengerovsky (1938–1998), Ukrainian volleyball player

== Other uses ==
- Vengerovsky District, district in Russia
