= There Will Be No Leave Today =

- Title card
- Written by: Aleksandr Gordon; Inna Makhova; Andrei Tarkovsky
- Directed by: Aleksandr Gordon; Andrei Tarkovsky
- Starring: Oleg Borisov; Aleksei Alekseyev; Pyotr Lyubeshkin
- Music by: Yuri Matskevich
- Country of origin: Soviet Union
- Original language: Russian

Production
- Cinematography: Lev Bunin; Ernst Yakovlev
- Running time: 46 min
- Production companies: VGIK; Central Television

Original release
- Release: 9 May 1959

There Will be No Leave Today (Russian: Сегодня увольнения не будет...) is a 1959 student film by the Russian film directors Andrei Tarkovsky and Aleksandr Gordon. Based on a real postwar incident, the film is about an army unit trying to dispose unexploded bombs to save a small town. It was Tarkovsky's and Gordon's second film, produced while being students at the State Institute of Cinematography (VGIK). The film was aired on Soviet Central Television in 1959 and consecutive years on Victory Day. For a long time it was thought to be lost, but was rediscovered in the mid-1990s.

== Plot ==
Construction workers find an old cache of bombs from World War II in an unnamed Russian town. An army unit is charged with solving this problem. The municipal committee decides that exploding the bombs would inflict too much damage on the town and so the army unit must transport the bombs manually to a safe site.

After the entire town is evacuated, the soldiers carry the bombs one by one to the armored transport truck. The danger of explosion looms. As the army unit concludes its mission the population returns to the town as the bombs are simultaneously destroyed at the safe site.

== Cast ==
- Oleg Borisov as captain Galich
- Aleksei Alekseyev as colonel Gvelesiani
- Pyotr Lyubeshkin as party secretary Vershinin
- Oleg Mokshantsev as military engineer Vishnyakov
- Vladimir Marenkov as military engineer Vasin
- Igor Kosukhin as military engineer Tsignadze
- Leonid Kuravlyov as soldier-engineer Morozov
- Stanislav Lyubshin as military engineer Sadovnikov

== Production ==
There Will Be No Leave Today was suggested by the State Institute of Cinematography (VGIK) to Tarkovsky and Gordon as a practical exercise for the two film students. The main objective for Tarkovsky and Gordon was not to produce a masterpiece, but to learn the basics of filmmaking through making an uncomplicated and easy-to-consume film. The project was based on a real postwar incident. To prepare Tarkovsky and Gordon interviewed witnesses of the incident and visited army barracks to study the military. The script was written jointly by Tarkovsky, Gordon and a third scriptwriter who was later replaced by a group of scriptwriters. The main storyline of the film was created in the beginning of writing the script, and survived with the exception of some minor changes. According to Gordon, Tarkovsky finished and contributed the majority of the script, with the hospital scenes and the civilian/soldier who volunteers to detonate one bomb being Tarkovsky's ideas.

Contrary to Tarkovsky's other student film The Killers, this film had a relatively high budget. The VGIK film school provided the equipment and a small part of the budget. The major part of the budget was provided by Soviet Central Television as the film was to be aired on the anniversary day of the capitulation of Nazi Germany in World War II. The higher budget allowed for professional actors in the main roles, such as Oleg Borisov. Other actors were Tarkvosky's and Gordon's classmates such as Leonid Kuravlyov and Stanislav Lyubshin. Other actor in non-lead roles were people from the province where the film was shot, working without receiving any compensation except the chance to appear in a film. The army also provided some support in the form of military equipment and troops as extras. The film was shot in Kursk over a period of three months. Editing took another three months.

== Distribution ==
Untypically for Tarkovsky There Will Be No Leave Today resembles a Soviet propaganda film, with heroic soldiers and the grateful population of the town. Using real army units and shot on location the film is similar in style to a docudrama. The film was aired first on Victory Day, 9 May 1959, on Soviet television despite the competition from a similar Lenfilm production based on the same incident. The film was broadcast again on Victory Day for at least three consecutive years. As many films with similar themes were shown on television during this era There Will Be No Leave Today did not become particularly popular or well-known. In later years films of the genre became less important and were routinely purged from the television archives. For a long time the film was thought to be lost, leading to rumors - denied by Aleksandr Gordon - that it was destroyed during a fire at the VGIK film school. The negatives of the film only reappeared in the mid-1990s when the director of the Moscow State Central Cinema Museum, Naum Kleiman, discovered them.
