= May Nights =

- Directed by: Aleksandr Rou
- Written by: Nikolai Rimsky-Korsakov (libretto); Nikolai Gogol (play); Konstantin Isaev
- Starring: Nikolai Dosenko; Tatyana Konyukhova; Aleksandr Khvylya
- Cinematography: Gavriil Egiazarov
- Music by: S. Potochkii
- Production company: Gorky Film Studios
- Release date: 1952
- Running time: 61 minutes
- Country: Soviet Union
- Language: Russian

May Nights (Russian: Майская ночь, или Утопленница, romanized: Maiskaya noch, ili utoplennitsa) is a 1952 Soviet 3D fantasy comedy film released by Moscow Gorky Film Studios, directed by Aleksandr Rou and starring Nikolai Dosenko, Tatyana Konyukhova and Aleksandr Khvylya. It is based on Nikolai Gogol's May Night, or the Drowned Maiden and the subsequent opera version by Nikolai Rimsky-Korsakov. It was directed by Alexander Rowe. The film is notable for being the first full-length autostereoscopic film in colour.

== Plot ==
While strolling under the blooming bird cherry tree in the evening, a group of girls encounters an old man and asks him to tell them a story. He agrees and begins recounting an event that took place one May night.

A young Cossack, Levko, the son of the village headman, secretly meets with Hanna. Unnoticed by anyone, they head to a pond and notice an old house by its shore. Levko tells Hanna that, according to rumors, a nobleman and his beautiful daughter once lived in the house. One day, the nobleman married and brought home a wife who turned out to be a witch. On the first night, the witch transformed into a black cat and attempted to kill the nobleman's daughter, but the girl struck her left hand. In retaliation, the witch manipulated things so that the nobleman kicked his daughter out of the house. Desperate, the young woman drowned herself and became the leader of all drowned souls. She later dragged her stepmother into the water, but the stepmother transformed into a drowned spirit herself. Since then, the young woman has been unable to find her among her fellow drowned spirits.

After calming Hanna, Levko leaves with his friends, but soon encounters his father, who scolds Hanna and forbids her from seeing Levko. In retaliation, the Cossacks play tricks on the headman and his guests, mocking them with songs and forcing the headman’s sister-in-law to be caught and locked up twice. After the fun and exhaustion, Levko comes to the pond and falls asleep in a boat. In his dream, he sees the young woman in the window of the old house, and she asks him to find her witch-stepmother among the drowned spirits. Levko watches the girls playing by the cliff and soon spots the witch. The drowned spirits surround her and drag her away. In gratitude for his help, the young woman gives Levko a note, which he finds in his hands after waking up. Levko gives the note to his angry father, revealing that it is a message from the commissioner, ordering Levko to marry Hanna. When questioned by his father, Levko invents a story about a recent meeting with the commissioner, during which the commissioner promised to visit the headman for dinner soon. Despite threatening his son with a flogging, the confused father reluctantly agrees to the marriage. Happy Levko heads to Hanna’s house, but she is still peacefully asleep.

After finishing his story, the old man prepares to sleep and promises the girls that he will tell them another scary tale the following evening.

== Cast ==
- Nikolai Dosenko as Levko Makogonenko
- Tatyana Konyukhova as Hanna Petrichenkova
- Aleksandr Khvylya as Evtukh Makogonenko, village leader
- Liliya Yudina as The Officer's Daughter
- Galina Grigoreva as The Witch-Stepmother
- Georgiy Millyar as The Village Clerk
- E. Cheoarskaya as Evtukh's Sister-in-law
- Aleksandr Zhukov as Karpo, a villager
- G. Nelidov as A Beekeeper
- Anton Dunajsky as A Distiller
- Vasili Bokarev
- Georgi Gumilevsky

== Bibliography ==
- Rollberg, Peter. Historical Dictionary of Russian and Soviet Cinema. Scarecrow Press, 2008.
- ""Mayskaya Noch "". National Film Register. Ministry of Culture of the Russian Федерации. Archived from the original on 2018-10-27.
- ""Mayskaya Noch "". Movies. domestic Encyclopedia кино.
