= The Crash of the Emirate =

Soviet historical drama film

- Russian poster
- Russian: Крушение эмирата
- Directed by: Vladimir Basov; Latif Faiziyev
- Written by: Vladimir Kreps
- Starring: Yevgeny Samoylov; K. Alimdzhanov; Vladimir Krasnopolsky
- Cinematography: Timofey Lebeshev
- Edited by: Antonina Medvedeva
- Music by: Dani Zakirov; Mikhail Ziv
- Production companies: Mosfilm; Uzbekfilm
- Release date: 1955
- Running time: 92 min.
- Country: Soviet Union
- Language: Russian

The Crash of the Emirate (Russian: Крушение эмирата, romanized: Krushenie emirata) is a 1955 Soviet adventure war film directed by Vladimir Basov and Latif Faiziyev.

== Plot ==
The film takes place in 1920. The West is trying to use the Bukhara Khanate to fight the Bolsheviks. Frunze and Kuybyshev go to Tashkent and raise the people against counterrevolutionaries.

== Cast ==
- Yevgeny Samoylov as Mikhail Frunze
- K. Alimdzhanov as Yuldash Akhunbabaev
- Vladimir Krasnopolsky as Valerian Kuybyshev
- Nelya Ataullaeva as Oigul
- Mikhail Pugovkin as Yasny
- Vladimir Balashov as Osipov
- Yunona Belorucheva as Zhermen
- Mukhamed Cherkezov as Durdyev
- Vladimir Basov as White Guard officer
- Abid Dshalilov as Grand Vizier
- Andrey Fayt as Peyli
- Yevgeny Teterin as Wostrosablin
- Abbos Bakirov as Emir of Bukhara

== See also ==
- Emirate of Bukhara
