= Stanislav Lyubshin =

Soviet and Russian actor and film director (b. 1933)

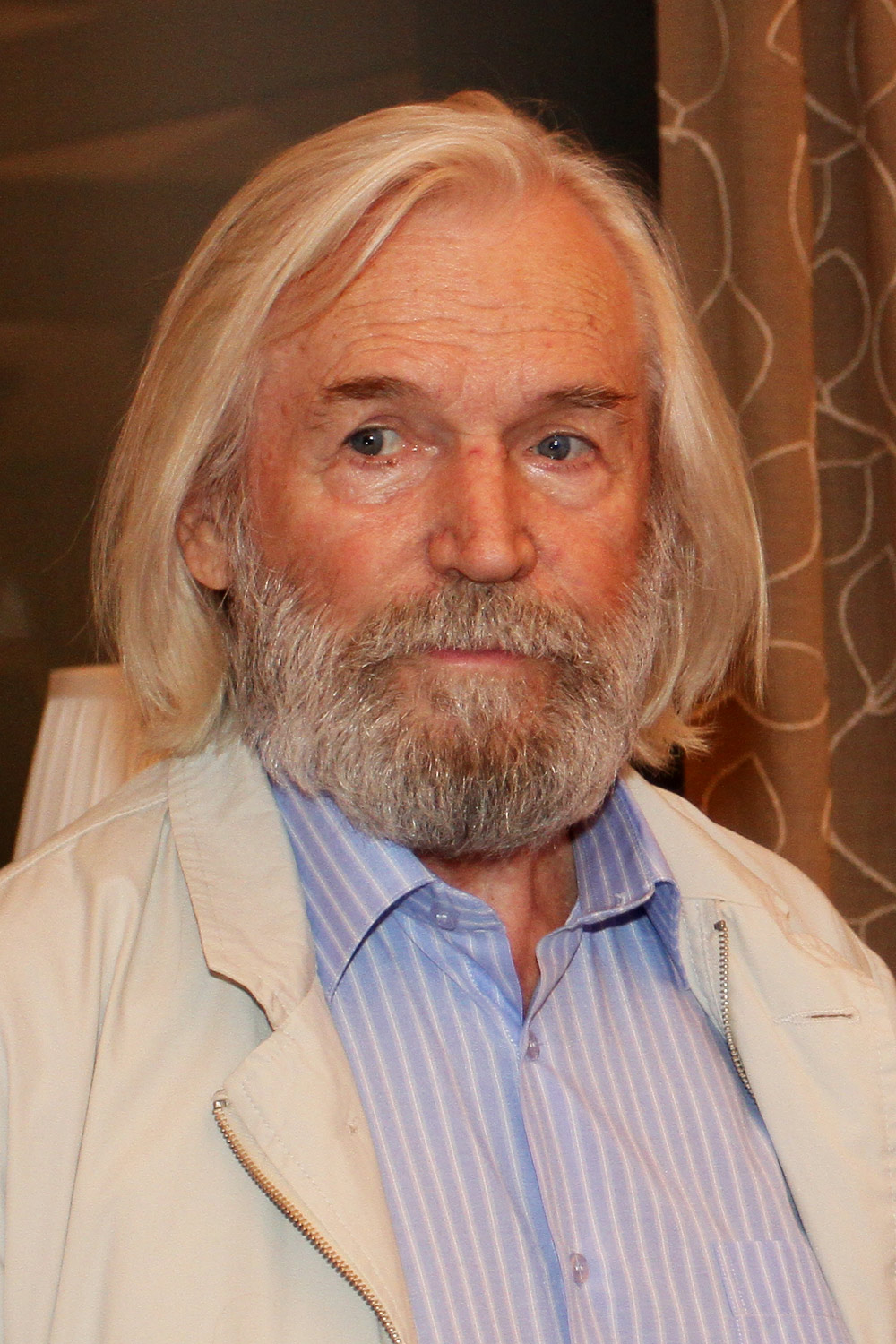
- Stanislav Lyubshin is an actor
- Born: Stanislav Andreyevich Lyubshin; 6 April 1933 (age 93); Moscow, RSFSR, USSR
- Citizenship: Soviet Union; Russia
- Occupations: Film director, actor and screenwriter
- Years active: 1958–present
- Spouse: Irina Lubshina

Stanislav Andreyevich Lyubshin (Russian: Станисла́в Андре́евич Любши́н; born 6 April 1933) is a Soviet and Russian actor, film director, and People's Artist of the RSFSR (1981).

== Life ==
Stanislav Lyubshin is a Russian actor whose recognition came after his role of a spy in The Shield and the Sword (1968).

He was born Stanislav Andreevich Lyubshin on April 6, 1933 in the village of Vladykino, a suburb of Moscow, Russia, Soviet Union. His father, Andrei Lyubshin, was an agricultural engineer, his mother was a milkmaid. Young Lyubshin was fond of theatre, he was encouraged by his parents to join the drama class at his school. From 1955 to 1959 he studied acting at Mikhail Shchepkin Higher Theatre School in Moscow, graduating in 1959 as an actor.

Lyubshin made his film debut in 1959, while a student, in There Will Be No Leave Today (1959), by directors Andrey Tarkovsky and Aleksandr Gordon. He shot to fame in the Soviet Union with the leading role as Weiss/Belov, a Russian spy in Nazi Germany, in the popular film The Shield and the Sword (Russian: Щит и Меч; 1968) by director Vladimir Basov. During the 1960s and 1970s, Lyubshin was among the most popular actors of the Soviet cinema.

From 1959 to 1964 Lyubshin was member of the troupe at Sovremennik Theatre in Moscow. There he was stage partner of Oleg Tabakov, Oleg Yefremov, Evgeni Evstigneev, Galina Volchek, Viktor Sergachev, Oleg Dal, Igor Kvasha, Valentin Gaft, and others. From 1964 to 1967 he was member of the Taganka Theatre company in Moscow. His stage partners there were famous actors such as Vladimir Vysotsky, Valeriy Zolotukhin, Leonid Filatov, Alla Demidova, Veniamin Smekhov, Ivan Bortnik, Zhanna Bolotova, Natalya Sayko, Nikolai Gubenko, and others.

Since 1981, Lyubshin has been a permanent member of the Moscow Art Theatre (MKhAT named after A. Chekhov). His stage partners there were famous Russian actors such as Mark Prudkin, Angelina Stepanova, Anastasiya Georgiyevskaya, Vasili Toporkov, Mikhail Bolduman, Pavel Massalsky, and many of the next generation MKhAT actors. His best known stage appearances included his roles in the classic plays by Anton Chekhov, such as The Cherry Orchard, The Three Sisters and Ivanov, among other plays.

Stanislav Lyubshin is a designated People's Actor of Russia and decorated with the Order of Service to Fatherland. He is living and working in Moscow, Russia.

== Filmography ==
- There Will Be No Leave Today (Segodnya uvolneniya ne budet, 1959)
- The Third Flare (Tretya raketa, 1963)
- If You Are Right... (Esli ty prav..., 1963)
- Bolshaya ruda, 1964
- Alpine Ballad (Alpiyskaya ballada, 1965)
- What is the Sea? (Kakoe ono, more?, 1966)
- I Am Twenty (Mne dvadtsat let, 1966)
- The Shield and the Sword (Shchit i mech, 1968)
- Red Square. Two Stories About Workers' and Peasants' Army (Krasnaya ploshchad. Dva rasskaza o raboche-krestyanskoy armii, 1971)
- First Love (Pervaya lyubov, 1971)
- My Life (Moya zhizn, 1972)
- Happy Go Lucky (Pechki-lavochki, 1972)
- Monologue (Monolog, 1973)
- Wolz — Life and Illusion of a German Anarchist (Wolz - Leben und Verklärung eines deutschen Anarchisten, 1974)
- Ksenia, Fedor's Beloved Wife (Ksenia, lubimaya zhena Fyodora, 1974)
- A Sentimental Story (Sentimentalnyy roman, 1977)
- Speech for the Defence (Slovo dlia zashchity, 1977)
- Call Me from Afar (Pozovi menya v dal' svetluyu, 1978)
- Vstrecha (1979)
- The Theme (Tema) (1979)
- Step (1979)
- Five Evenings (Pyat vecherov 1979)
- Don't Shot White Swans (Ne strelyayte v belykh lebedey, 1980)
- We Are Cheerful, Happy, Talented! (My vesely, schastlivy, talantlivy!) (1986)
- Kin-Dza-Dza (1986)
- Joys of the Youth (Zabavy molodykh) (1987)
- The Black Monk (1988)
- Vechnyy muzh (1989)
- Kanuvshee vremya (1989)
- Shkura (1991)
- Nelyubov (1991)
- Tsar Ivan the Terrible (1991)
- See Paris And Die (Uvidet Parizh i umeret) (1992)
- The Smoke (Dym) (1992)
- Bolshoy kapkan, ili Solo dlya koshki pri polnoy lune (1992)
- Tsar Ivan the Terrible (1993)
- Idiot's Dreams (Mechty idiota) (1993)
- Terra incognita (1994)
- Tsarevich Aleksei (1996)
- Movie About Movie (Kino pro kino) (2002)
- The Country Estate (2004)
- Lie Detector For Sale (Prodayotsya detektor lzhi) (2005)
- Rieltor (2005)
- Antikiller D.K: Lyubov bez pamyati (2009)
- He's a Dragon (2015)
- Godunov (2018-2019)

== Family ==
- First wife Svetlana Deziderovna Lubshina (died)
  - Son – Yuri Lyubshin, cinematographer (born 24 February 1955).
  - Fiancée – Elena Aminova, an actress.
    - Granddaughter – Daria Lubshina, director, actress.
  - Son – Vadim Lyubshin, actor (born 5 October 1964).
- Second wife – Irina Lubshina (Korneeva), a journalist.
