= The Third Flare =

- Russian: Третья ракета
- Directed by: Richard Viktorov
- Written by: Vasil Bykaŭ
- Starring: Yury Dubrovin; Yevgeny Gvozdev; Stanislav Lyubshin; Nadezhda Sementsova; Georgi Zhzhyonov
- Cinematography: Andrei Kirillov
- Music by: Yevgeny Glebov
- Release date: 1963
- Country: Soviet Union
- Language: Russian

The Third Flare (Russian: Третья ракета) is a 1963 Soviet World War II film directed by Richard Viktorov.

== Plot ==
The film tells about people who, being in the same trench, oppose the fascist tanks.

== Cast ==
- Stanislav Lyubshin as Vasiliy Loznyak
- Georgi Zhzhyonov as Zheltykh
- Spartak Fedotov as Petrov
- Nadezhda Sementsova as Lyusya
- Igor Komarov as Lukyanov
- Yuriy Dubrovin
- Leonid Davydov-Suboch as Aleksey Zadorozhniy
- Yevgeny Gvozdev as Kombat (as Ye. Gvozdev)
- Vladimir Prokofyev
- Ivan Zharov
