= Marina's Destiny =

1953 film

- Directed by: Viktor Ivchenko; Isaak Shmaruk
- Written by: Lidiya Kompaniyets
- Starring: Yekaterina Litvinenko; Nikolai Gritsenko; Tatyana Konyukhova; Les Serdyuk; Mikhail Kuznetsov; Boris Andreyev
- Cinematography: Vladimir Voytenko
- Edited by: K. Shapovalova
- Release date: 1953
- Running time: 99 minutes
- Country: Soviet Union
- Language: Russian

Marina's Destiny (Russian: «Судьба Марины», romanized: Sud’ba Mariny, Ukrainian: «Доля Марини», romanized: Dolya Maryny) is a 1953 Soviet drama film directed by Viktor Ivchenko. It was entered into the 1954 Cannes Film Festival.

== Plot ==
The story takes place in the Ukrainian village of Lebedivka. Marina Vlasenko, a hardworking peasant woman, eagerly awaits the return of her husband, Terentiy Vlasenko, who left five years earlier to study agronomy at the Kyiv Agricultural Institute on the kolkhoz's recommendation. However, after his return, Marina's happiness is short-lived. On the very first evening, Terentiy asks for a divorce, claiming that she is no longer his equal, that he has spiritually and intellectually outgrown her, and that he cannot bury his talent in the earth. He wants to move to the city to pursue science and write a dissertation.

Marina is left alone, raising their daughter while dedicating herself to work and study. For an entire year, she conducts laboratory experiments to increase the sugar content of beets. The kolkhoz management appoints her as the leader of a new team within the collective farm, allowing her to move her experiments from the laboratory to the field. Marina’s team achieves success, harvesting a rich crop of beets (905 centners per hectare) with increased sugar content. As a result of her significant achievements in agriculture, Marina Panasivna is awarded the title of Hero of Socialist Labor.

It is believed that the character of Marina was based on Marina Stepanovna Suvorova, the leader of the Zemetchinsky beet farm. Like Marina, Suvorova worked on growing sugar beets and was awarded the title of Hero of Socialist Labor in 1948.

== Cast ==
- Yekaterina Litvinenko
- Nikolai Gritsenko
- Tatyana Konyukhova
- Les Serdyuk
- Mikhail Kuznetsov
- Boris Andreyev
- Nonna Koperzhinskaya
- Rimma Manukovskaya
- Leonid Bykov
- Roza Makagonova
- Mikhail Zadneprovsky
- Olesya Ivanova
- M. Belousov
- Yury Timoshenko
- Klavdiya Khabarova
- Yevgeny Matveyev
