= To whom will God send =

- Directed by: Vladimir Zaykin
- Screenplay by: Vladimir Zaykin
- Produced by: Alexey Shechtman
- Starring: Larisa Udovichenko; Stanislav Sadalsky; Sergey Migitsko
- Cinematography: Mikhail Levitin; Vladimir Vasiliev
- Edited by: Sergey Shemyakin
- Production companies: Lenfilm; Roskomkino; SPiEF
- Release date: 1994
- Running time: 77 min.
- Country: Russia
- Language: Russian

To whom will God send (Russian: На кого Бог пошлёт, romanized: Na kogo Bog poschlyot) is a 1994 Russian comedy film directed by Vladimir Zaykin.

== Plot ==
Starting 1970s. Marina Rodionova gives birth to a child from a donor. Grown up son Andrei she tells the legend of the deceased father. It takes many years. Son of a student accidentally discovers that his father is a professor Hlyuzdin who teaches at his institute. Andrew's friend can not get from Ladder strict professor and then Andrew decides to introduce his father and mother.

== Cast ==
- Larisa Udovichenko as Marina Rodionova
- Stanislav Sadalsky as Pavel Hlyuzdin
- Maria Lobachova as Nastya Sukonnikova
- Leonid Torkeani as Andrei
- Sergey Migitsko as Arkady
- Igor Dmitriev as Rodion Arkadievich Zosimovsky
- Vladimir Zaykin as episode
- Yevgeni Lebedev as episode
- Andrei Chumanov as episode
- Kira Kreylis-Petrova as Hlyuzdin's mother
- Konstantin Khabensky as pedestrian with glasses

== Prizes and awards ==
- White Sun of the Adler 96: Best Film competition, the prize for Best Actor (Sadalsky)
- Open Grand Prix Festival of Selb, Germany
- Prize The Best Debut Comedy Festival, Krasnodar
- Prize Best Actor festival Constellation 95
