= Three Times About Love =

- Russian: Трижды о любви
- Directed by: Viktor Tregubovich
- Written by: Budimir Metalnikov
- Starring: Sergei Prokhanov; Marina Tregubovich; Marina Levtova; Nadezhda Shumilova; Valentina Kovel
- Cinematography: Nikolai Pokoptsev
- Edited by: Margarita Shadrina
- Music by: Georgi Portnov
- Release date: 1981
- Country: Soviet Union
- Language: Russian

Three Times About Love (Russian: Трижды о любви) is a 1981 Soviet romantic drama film directed by Viktor Tregubovich.

== Plot ==
The film tells about the collective farm driver Vasily Lobanov, who, having returned from the army, finds out that his beloved girl got married and he decides to choose a more suitable bride.

== Cast ==
- Sergei Prokhanov as Vasiliy Fedorovich Lobanov
- Marina Tregubovich as Verka
- Marina Levtova as Elena Ivanovna
- Nadezhda Shumilova as Nyurka
- Valentina Kovel as Anna Makarovna Lobanova
- Aleksey Mironov as Fedor Lobanov
- Ivan Agafonov as Anisimych
- Yelena Obleukhova as Tonya
- Aleksey Zharkov as Pashka
- Lyudmila Ksenofontova as Klava (as L. Ksenofontova)
