= Sergei Prokhanov =

Sergei Prokhanov PAR
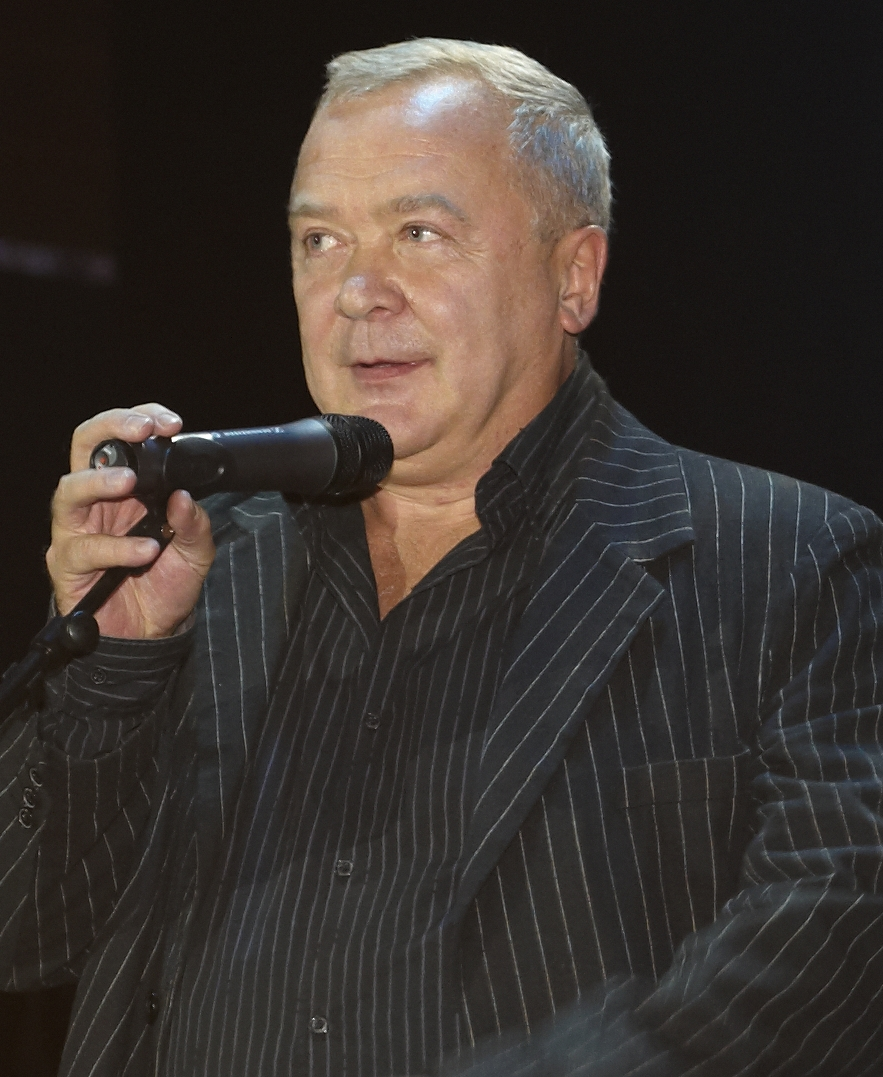
- Born: Sergei Borisovich Prokhanov; December 29, 1952 (age 73); Moscow, Russia
- Education: Boris Shchukin Theatre Institute
- Years active: 1970–present
- Spouse: Tatyana Prokhanova

Sergei Borisovich Prokhanov (Russian: Серге́й Бори́сович Проха́нов; born December 29, 1952) is a Soviet and Russian theater and film actor, theater director, artistic director of Moscow's Luna Theater. People's Artist of the Russian Federation (2005). The most famous for him was the role Kesha Chetvergov in Vladimir Grammatikov's comedy Mustached Nanny (1977).

== Selected filmography ==
- Oh, That Nastya! as pioneer leader (1971)
- Olga Sergeyevna as Nikita (TV, 1975)
- Mustached Nanny as Kesha (1977)
- The Luncheon on the Grass (1979) as Ivan Nikolayevich Kovalev
- Lenin in Paris as messenger (1981)
- Three Times About Love as Vasiliy Fedorovich Lobanov (1981)
- Magistral (Russian: Магистраль) as Student (1983)
- Investigation Held by ZnaToKi: Midday Thief as Ivan Agafonov (1985)
- Genius as Kostik (1991)
