= White Dew (film) =

- Directed by: Igor Dobrolyubov
- Written by: Aleksei Dudarev
- Starring: Vsevolod Sanayev; Nikolai Karachentsov; Mikhail Kokshenov; Gennady Garbuk; Boris Novikov
- Cinematography: Grigoriy Masalskiy
- Music by: Yan Frenkel
- Production company: Belarusfilm
- Release date: 1983
- Running time: 84 minutes
- Country: Soviet Union
- Language: Russian

White Dew (Russian: Белые росы, romanized: Belye rosy) is a 1983 Soviet romantic comedy-drama film directed by Igor Dobrolyubov.

It was chosen as comedy of the year by Soviet Screen.

== Plot ==
The Belarusian village White Dew is preparing for demolition soon, and its inhabitants are preparing to move into typical multi—storey buildings. The central conflict is a love triangle that almost destroyed the family of one of the siblings.

A respected man in the village — an 80-year-old veteran of labor and three wars, Fedor (Fedos) Filimonovich Khodas (Vsevolod Sanaev) is worried about the fate of his three sons. He has been widowed for a long time, and his sons have grown up. The eldest, Andrey (Gennady Garbuk), is a thorough man, but overly prudent. The middle one, Sasha (Mikhail Kokshenov), leads a nomadic life, has not been home for 15 years. The younger, Vaska (Nikolai Karachentsov) is a joker and a merry man.

The original director's move is to convey the events shown through the characters' dreams.

Villagers receive warrants for apartments in a high-rise building in the city, which gradually absorbs the village. This forces Fedos and his neighbors to start living a city life different from their usual way of life.

Vaska returns to White Dew after 3 days of absence to the city, where he was invited to a friend by an accordion player for his third wedding and learns from Andrei that at that time her former boyfriend Mishka Kisel (Stanislav Sadalsky), who returned to the village, came to his wife Marousia (Galina Polskikh).

After looking home for a while, seeing his beloved daughter Galyunya and talking with his wife, Vaska goes to his father. Fedos never approved of this marriage, but Vaska loves his daughter and is not happy with his wife's decision to divorce. Vaska cannot have a heart-to-heart conversation with his wife, influence her.

At this time, Mishka and Marousia are sorting out their relationship. At one time, Mishka left the White Dew to mine gold. Now, having returned and found out that Marousia is married to Vaska, whom he envies, he is going to go gold mining again. It's cold there, hard work, Mishka doesn't have the housing conditions to take Marousia with him, but there is gold there. Marousia takes it out on Mishka because he left her pregnant, disappeared and did not write. Mishka is offended that Marousia did not wait for him. Marousia, who gave birth to a daughter, having convinced everyone that she was born seven months old, is torn between feelings — obligations towards Vaska, who hid her shame and loves the girl, and feelings towards Mishka. Finally, she tells him that his daughter is his. Mishka continues to convince Marousia that he still loves her.

In connection with the imminent receipt of warrants for apartments, the father is having a family council, at which, in addition to Fedos and Vaska, Andrei and his wife are present, who are trying to get more benefits for themselves in the current situation — if the father is more concerned about the area of new housing so that it is not far to go to his wife's grave, then Andrei's wife is more interested in as it is more profitable to get rid of the cow, and Andrei has already agreed to adapt his house for a dacha and is ready to sell his father's house to his boss, for demolition. During the altercation between Andrei and Vaska, who is uncomfortable with his brother's behavior, the true purpose of Andrei's visit turns out to be — they should get a two—room apartment, and Fedos — a one-room apartment; Andrei enters the city executive committee and tries to persuade his father to move in with them - thus, they will get a three-room apartment. Fedos does not agree, he does not want to push Andrei into sin, forcing him to wait for his death. Fedos is also waiting for Sasha, whom, as he correctly feels, Andrei will not want to take into his house. The news that Vaska is going to divorce and leave the house to his daughter, coupled with a reminder of the childlessness of Andrei's wife, finally quarrels with his brother and father.

Timofey, a neighbor, undertakes to cure the radicular pain that has worsened in Fedos with a brick heated in a decoction of herbs. The treatment put Fedos on his feet, but did not help in general, so Vaska took up the case. While catching bees, he met a Mishka, with whom there was an altercation and in the heat of the moment Kisel said that Galyunya was his daughter. For this, Vaska put a bee on Mishka's face, and Mishka put a bruise on Vaska. Returning home, Vaska first of all looks in the mirror for his daughter's resemblance to himself to refute the words of the Mishka.

The father assumes the role of a negotiator in the relationship of the youngest son. He meets with Mishka, finds out his attitude towards Marousia and his daughter and decides that Vaska will move to Fedos the next day, and Mishka will move to Marousia in a couple of days, whom he will marry. Another condition of Fedos is that his granddaughter should not know anything about Mishka as a father. After that, the old man brings the decision to his son. Unexpectedly, Galyunya comes to the Mishka's house and talks to his mother, offering her doll so that «your Mishka does not score my folder», after which Kiselikha reproaches her son for his connection with Marousia.

Vaska still can't talk to Marousia and agrees to get divorced in the morning. In order to speed up the divorce and give credibility in court, Vaska agrees to lie — asks Marousia to say that he drinks, does not come home and does not look after his daughter. To make it more convincing, he leaves Marusya to wait for him in court, goes to the store for a drink, but, returning, intercepts a baby carriage rushing to the intersection. The stroller falls, empty bottles spill out of it instead of the child, and the person who was taking them to hand them over begins to make a row. Vaska throws a bottle at the offender, but hits the glass of a passing car. Vaska gets 15 days of arrest in the people's court.

At night, without saying goodbye to Marousia, Mishka leaves the White Dew for good. With the news of this, Andrei comes to Vaska, who is painting a public fence at this time. Under the pretext of drinking beer from a barrel, Vaska persuades Andrey to switch places with him for half an hour and rushes home to see his daughter.

It is difficult for Fedos to move into an apartment — he must leave the house, determine the property, sell the cow. Upset, he returns home, where his neighbor Timofey meets him and offers to drink a tincture to rub his back. To check if the tincture is poisonous, the neighbor moistens a piece of bread and throws it to the yard dog Jack. The old men are drinking, talking about a new life in the city, at this time Timofey's mother-in-law comes with the news that the Jack has died. The old people race to the city, where they are taken to the hospital by ambulance to wash their stomachs. Upon returning, they meet a live Jack, who was simply exhausted from alcohol and who fell asleep in the yard.

Vaska, after talking with the family who moved into the apartment, returns to community service, where he discovers that Andrei has already been taken away. The night spent in the cell and the dream he saw change Andrei's worldview — he is ready to leave his wife and offers Vaska to go for a drink with him.

Vaska returned from the police to his old house, fundamentally not wanting to go either to his wife's apartment (until she herself calls him) or to his father's house.

Sasha returns home, his father obliges him to marry. The son agrees and asks to pick up a bride. Fedos was waiting for such a turn and continues to develop his plan — the apartment on the floor above was received by the postman Verka (Natalya Khorokhorina), Sasha's classmate. At first, the matchmaking did not go very well: they even brought Verka to tears, there was a small scandal. But soon they manage to come to an agreement.

After the wedding, Marousia approaches Vaska and asks him to return. Vaska agrees and asks to prepare a sleeping place for his father, who has nowhere to spend the night.

After Sasha's wedding, at the dawn of a new day, old Fedos thanks the sun for his life and asks for light and warmth for the children.

== Cast ==
=== Lead roles ===
- Vsevolod Sanayev – Fedos Hodas
- Nikolai Karachentsov – Vasiliy (Vaska), the youngest son
- Mikhail Kokshenov – Aleksander (Sashka), the middle son
- Gennady Garbuk – Andrei, the eldest son
- Boris Novikov – Timofei

=== Supporting roles ===
- Galina Polskikh – Marousia, wife of Vasiliy
- Natalya Khorokhorina – Verka, postman
- Stanislav Sadalsky – Mikhail (Mishka) Kisel
- Stefaniya Stanyuta – Kiselikha
- Irina Egorova – Andrei's wife
- Alexander Bespaly – Mikhail (Mishka)
- Yury Kukharenok – Skvortsov
- Yulia Kosmacheva – Galyunya
- Galina Makarova – Matrona
