= Everything's the Wrong Way =

- Russian: Всё наоборот
- Directed by: Vitali Fetisov; Vladimir Grammatikov
- Written by: Pavel Lungin
- Starring: Olga Mashnaya; Mikhail Efremov; Oleg Tabakov; Svetlana Nemolyaeva; Aleksandr Pashutin
- Cinematography: Aleksandr Garibyan
- Edited by: Valentina Mironova
- Music by: Mark Minkov
- Release date: 1981
- Running time: 68 minute
- Country: Soviet Union
- Language: Russian

Everything's the Wrong Way (Russian: Всё наоборот, romanized: Vsyo naoborot, lit. 'Always back-to-front') is a 1981 Soviet romantic comedy film directed by Vitali Fetisov and Vladimir Grammatikov.

== Plot ==
The film tells about a school graduate who falls in love with the girl he sees on the street and decides that he should marry her.

== Cast ==
- Olga Mashnaya as Natasha Yermakova
- Mikhail Efremov as Andrey Loskutov
- Oleg Tabakov
- Svetlana Nemolyaeva
- Aleksandr Pashutin
- Liliya Zakharova
- Alfiya Khabibulina as Lyuba (as L. Khabibulina)
- Igor Sternberg as Bob (as I. Shternberg)
- Vladimir Grammatikov
- Avangard Leontev as Lev Borisovich (as A. Leontev)
