= Liliya Yudina =

Russian actress (1929–2025)

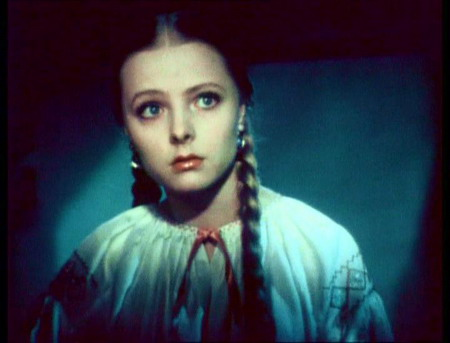
Liliya Yudina

Liliya Vitaliyevna Yudina (Russian: Лилия Витальевна Юдина; 14 May 1929 – 23 November 2025) was a Russian actress.

== Life and career ==
Lilia Yudina was born in Moscow on 14 May 1929 and was educated at the Boris Shchukin Theatre Institute.

In 1952, she debuted in film May Nights. In 1953, she became an actress at the Maly Theatre. Yudina last appeared on the Maly Theater stage in September 2023, playing Turusina in the play "Enough Stupidity in Every Wise Man" by Alexander Ostrovsky.

In 1965, she was named an Honored Artist of the RSFSR, and a People's Artist of the RSFSR in 1974. She was awarded the Order of Friendship of Peoples in 1990.

Yudina died on 23 November 2025, at the age of 96.

== Selected filmography ==
- May Nights (1952) as Pannochka
- Lights on the River (1954) as Elena Ivanovna
- Dangerous Paths (1954) as Galina Sergeyevna
- Behind the Footlights (1956) as Liza - Sinichkin daughter
- V šest ráno na letišti (1957) as Letuska
- Fugitive from Yantarny (1969) as queen
- Tchaikovsky (1970) as Milyukova
