= Incognito from St. Petersburg =

- Directed by: Leonid Gaidai
- Based on: The Government Inspector by Nikolai Gogol
- Starring: Sergey Migitsko; Anatoli Papanov; Nonna Mordyukova
- Music by: Aleksandr Zatsepin
- Distributed by: Mosfilm
- Release date: 1977
- Running time: 91 min.
- Country: Soviet Union
- Language: Russian

Incognito from St. Petersburg (Russian: Инкогнито из Петербурга, romanized: Inkognito iz Peterburga) is a 1977 Soviet historical crime comedy film directed by Leonid Gaidai, based upon Nikolai Gogol's play, The Government Inspector.

== Plot ==
In a small town of the Russian Empire during the 19th century reign mores typical of that time. The mayor and the other officials take bribes, embezzle public money, drink and play cards, while idly discussing the latest town gossip. But soon alarming news arrives – a stern government inspector from St. Petersburg has been sent to the city, and even worse, a plain-clothed one!

Exactly at the time when the privy council is taking place, which the mayor hurriedly organizes along with other rulers of the city, the news comes that Ivan Aleksandrovich Khlestakov is residing at a hotel – a young man who is not paying the bills and behaves very suspiciously. The confused mayor and his staff decide that Khlestakov is the very same incognito-auditor from St. Petersburg.

...In reality, Khlestakov is a minor official who after losing at cards fared up in this town without a penny of money. When the rulers of the city are beginning to cautiously deal with the "formidable auditor", by trying to find out something from him, Khlestakov gradually realizes that he has been mistaken for a "significant person" and that this circumstance can be very beneficial for him. Always keeping the mayor and his minions afraid with tales of his high position in Petersburg, Khlestakov begins to "borrow" from everyone, and in fact – to extort the duped and intimidated city officials of money. The mayor, judge, head of post and others - all carry and bear money to the "auditor of St. Petersburg"... Then the "cash flow" increases: merchants and traders of the city begin to bear "offerings" to Khlestakov, asking to protect them from the mayor's harassment. Crazed from impunity, Khlestakov makes an offer of marriage, nearly seduces the daughter of the mayor, but soon leaves, supposedly to "visit to his uncle".

And soon sounds the thunder... The postmaster opens the letter, which Khlestakov sent to a friend in St. Petersburg, and nearly faints from the shock! He runs to the mayor and other officials who are celebrating the engagement of the mayor's daughter and "the powerful official", and blows them away with mind-boggling news: Khlestakov is an impostor who has completely fooled them! Suddenly a harsh voice from a gendarme is heard: "An official who has arrived on behalf of the command of St. Petersburg, requires you to come to him at this very hour. He is staying at a hotel". And a famous "silent scene" follows: with bulging eyes, the burned embezzlers who were deceived by the petty crook with brilliant simplicity, stare at each other in shocked silence...

== Cast ==
- Sergey Migitsko – Ivan Aleksandrovich Khlestakov, an official from the St. Petersburg / Government Inspector (dialogue voiced by Aleksei Zolotnitsky; singing voice by Oleg Anofriyev for the song Ah Petersburg (ах петербург))
- Anatoli Papanov – Anton Antonovich Skvoznik-Dmuhanovsky, mayor
- Nonna Mordyukova – Anna Andreevna, mayor's wife
- Olga Anokhina – Maria Antonovna, mayor's daughter
- Anatoly Kuznetsov – Ammos Fedorovich Lyapkin-Tyapkin, judge
- Vyacheslav Nevinny – Artemy Filippovich Zemlyanika, trustee of charitable institutions
- Valery Nosik – Luka Lukich Khlopov, superintendent of schools
- Leonid Kuravlyov – Ivan Kuzmich Shpekin, postmaster
- Leonid Kharitonov – Petr Ivanovich Dobchinsky, city landowner
- Oleg Anofriyev – Petr Ivanovich Bobchinsky, city landowner
- Sergey Filippov – Osip, Khlestakov's servant
- Aleksandr Shirvindt – Christian Ivanovich Gibner, district doctor
- Stanislav Chekan – Ivan Karpovich Uhovertov, marshal
- Mikhail Kokshenov – Derzhimorda, gendarme
- Natalya Krachkovskaya – plump lady at the engagement party

== See also ==
- List of Soviet films of 1977
