= Boris Bystrov =

Russian actor (1945–2024)

- Борис Быстров
- Bystrov as Aladdin in 1966
- Born: Boris Yevgenievich Bystrov; 12 February 1945; Russian SFSR, USSR
- Died: 17 August 2024 (aged 79); Moscow, Russia
- Occupations: Film actor, stage actor, voice actor
- Awards: .

Boris Yevgenievich Bystrov (Russian: Борис Евгеньевич Быстров; 12 February 1945 – 17 August 2024) was a Soviet and Russian actor and voice actor.

== Biography ==
In 1966, he graduated from the Moscow Art Theatre. After graduating, he worked at the Lenkom Theatre. In 1968 he became an actor with the Yermolova Theatre. In the 1970s, he started working in voice-over and dubbing of foreign feature films and cartoons. In the animated series The Simpsons and Futurama, he voiced all the male roles for several years.

Bystrov died on 18 August 2024, at the age of 79.

== Selected filmography ==
=== Actor ===
- 1966: Aladdin and His Magic Lamp as Aladdin
- 1968: Goal! Another Goal! as Anatoli Starodub
- 1970: Adventures of the Yellow Suitcase as pilot Verevkin
- 1984: TASS Is Authorized to Declare... as Agafonov
- 1984: Lets the Charms Last Long as Zhenya
- 1994: La Piste du télégraphe as Scotty

=== Dubbing roles ===
- Animated content
  - 1989: The Simpsons (voice-over translation) Season 9–16, Season 19 (all males), season 20-29 (some males)
  - 2007: The Simpsons Movie (full dub), as Homer Simpson
  - 1991: Darkwing Duck, as Vladimir Goudenov Grizzlikof, Comet Guy and Taurus Bulba
  - 1999-2003-2013: Futurama (voice-over translation) (all males)
  - Animaniacs, Thaddeus Plotz
- Film
  - 1980: Long Road in the Dunes as Heinrich
