= Goal! Another Goal! =

- Russian: Удар! Ещё удар!
- Directed by: Viktor Sadovsky
- Written by: Lev Kassil; Vladimir Kunin; Viktor Sadovsky
- Starring: Viktor Korshunov; Valentin Smirnitskiy; Galina Yatskina; Boris Bystrov; Vladimir Kenigson
- Cinematography: Rostislav Davydov; Aleksandr Dibrivnyy
- Edited by: Ye. Sadovskaya; Ye. Shkultina
- Music by: Vladlen Chistyakov
- Release date: 1968
- Country: Soviet Union
- Language: Russian

Goal! Another Goal! (Russian: Удар! Ещё удар!) is a 1968 Soviet sports comedy film directed by Viktor Sadovsky.

== Plot ==
The film shows the final football match in Leningrad between the Leningrad Zarya team and the West European Reefs. The son of the Zarya coach went to visit one girl before the match and he returned only in the morning, which is why he was suspended from participation in the game. suddenly one player is injured and Sergey replaces him.

== Cast ==
- Viktor Korshunov as Coach Tamantsev
- Valentin Smirnitskiy as Sergei Tamantsev
- Galina Yatskina as Zhenya Strumilina
- Boris Bystrov as Anatoli Starodub
- Vladimir Kenigson as Manager Khomutayev
- Nikolay Zaseev-Rudenko as Captain Krutilin (as N. Zaseev)
- Vladimir Treshchalov as Konstantin Malkov
- Aleksandr Grave as Kesha Fedorin
