= Magistral (1983 film) =

- Russian: Магистраль
- Directed by: Viktor Tregubovich
- Written by: Vladimir Barabashov; Viktor Tregubovich
- Starring: Kirill Lavrov; Vsevolod Kuznetsov; Lyudmila Gurchenko; Pavel Semenikhin; Marina Tregubovich; Vladimir Gostyukhin; Yuri Demich; Ivan Agafonov; Vladimir Menshov; Sergei Prokhanov
- Cinematography: Eduard Rozovsky
- Edited by: Margarita Shadrina
- Music by: Aleksey Rybnikov
- Production company: Lenfilm
- Release date: 1983
- Running time: 93 min
- Country: Soviet Union
- Language: Russian

Magistral (Russian: Магистраль) is a 1983 Soviet railroad drama film based on the book "Zharkie peregony" by Vladimir Barabashov and directed by Viktor Tregubovich.

== Plot ==
Set in the 1980s Soviet Union, the film centers on a disastrous collision on the Siberian railway called "Magistral" and the chaotic circumstances pertinent to that accident. "Magistral" railway has many big and small problems, outdated infrastructure, inadequate management and poor resources under the Soviet bureaucracy. The railroad's throughput is lower than necessary, so one hasty decision sends a cargo train on a collision course with a passenger train. At the same time the alarm system fails and communication channels malfunction, so the top managers remain oblivious to the emerging disaster. Eventually the cargo train collides head on with the passenger train, causing much damage and human suffering. Soviet administration chairman summons the railroad management to a brainstorming meeting that concludes that the disaster was caused by systemic degradation of the railroad.

== Cast ==
- Kirill Lavrov as Urzhumov
- Vsevolod Kuznetsov as Zhelnin
- Lyudmila Gurchenko as Gvozdeva
- Pavel Semenikhin as Sanka
- Marina Tregubovich as Lyudmila
- Vladimir Gostyukhin as Boychuk
- Ivan Agafonov as Shilov
- Vladimir Menshov as Potapov
- Sergei Prokhanov as Student
- Boris Sokolov as Feodor Isayev
- Mikhail Pogorzhelsky as Urzhumov's assistant
- Yuri Demich as Sergei Kolobov
- Petr Shelokhonov as Chairman Gadalov
- Feodor Odinokov
- Igor Dmitriev as Igor Borisovich
- Era Ziganshina
- Aleksandr Lipov
- Arkadiy Trusov
- Natalia Egorova
