= Aleksei Kapler =

Soviet filmmaker (1903–1979)

- Born: Лазарь Яковлевич Каплер; 15 September 1903 (in Julian calendar); Kyiv
- Died: 11 September 1979 (aged 75)
- Occupation: Writer
- Partner(s): Svetlana Alliluyeva, Tatyana Zlatogoroda

Aleksei Yakovlevich Kapler (also Alexei, Russian: Алексей Яковлевич Каплер, born Lazar Yankelevich Kapler; 28 September 1903 – 11 September 1979) was a prominent Soviet filmmaker, screenwriter, actor, and writer. He was known as screenwriter of many Soviet movies, such as Lenin in 1918, Amphibian Man, The Blue Bird and Striped Trip, as well as one of the anchors and directors of TV program Kinopanorama (a cinema overview).

== Early life ==
Kapler was born into a wealthy family of Jewish merchants in Kiev in 1903, the son of Yakov Naftalievich Kapler and Raisa Zakhar'yevna Kapler (née Krintsberg). As an adolescent, he participated in local theater productions. In particular, he participated in a puppet theater, along with Sergei Yutkevich, Grigori Kozintsev, Michał Waszyński, and Konstantin Mardzhanov.

He and his colleagues eventually moved to Leningrad. There, Kapler appeared in several films directed by Kozintsev. In the 1930s, Kapler was a scriptwriter for a series of films about the life of Vladimir Lenin, which were directed by Mikhail Romm. For this, he became a recipient of the Stalin Prize in 1941.

== Internments in the Gulag ==
Kapler is also known as the first love of Joseph Stalin's then teenage daughter Svetlana Alliluyeva, who was more than 20 years his junior. According to Stalin's daughter, that was the reason for Kapler to be sentenced in 1943 to five years in exile on charges of anti-Soviet agitation. He was sent to Vorkuta region, where he worked as a photographer and lived in a tiny room partitioned off in the corner of the local photo studio.

In 1948, after returning to Moscow without permission, he was imprisoned the second time and spent five more years in Minlag labour camp by Inta. In 1953, after Stalin's death, he was released and exonerated of all charges in 1954. After the release, Kapler continued working on cinema and TV.

== Personal life ==
His first wife (married 1921–1930) was the actress Tatiana Tarnowska (1898–1994), daughter of Countess Maria Tarnowska. With Tatiana he had a son, Anatoly (b. 1927). His second wife (married 1953–1960) was actress Valentina Tokarskaya (1906–1996) whom he met in exile. Before his second marriage, he had an affair with Svetlana Alliluyeva, Stalin's daughter. Kapler's last wife (married 1960 till his death in 1979) was poet Yulia Drunina (1924–1991).

== Filmography ==
- 1926 The Overcoat (actor)
- 1930 A Licence to Have a Woman (silent film, black and white, Ukrainfilm studio, Kyiv, director, screenwriter), shown at the XXV Moscow International Film Festival, 2003
- 1931 Shakhta 12–28 (Mine 12-28) (director)
- 1937 Lenin in October (screenwriter)
- 1939 Lenin in 1918, the sequel to Lenin in October screenwriter
- 1942 A Good Lad (screenwriter)
- 1943 She Defends the Motherland, screenwriter
- 1943 Den za Dnyom (Day After Day) (screenwriter)
- 1955 Behind Show Windows, comedy; screenwriter
- 1956 Early Joys
- 1957 An Unusual Summer, a sequel to Early Joys
- 1976 The Blue Bird (screenwriter)
- 1961 Striped Trip, adventure-comedy; screenwriter
- 1962 Amphibian Man, screenwriter
- 1986 Soshedshie s nebes (Descended From the Heavens), Lenfilm studio, is based on Kapler's novel, Two of Twenty Millions.
- 1996 The Return of the Battleship, based on Kapler's novel, Return of the Battleship
