= Boris Vengerovsky =

Russian sound engineer

- Born: Boris Vladimirovich Vengerovsky; 15 September 1931 (age 94); Moscow
- Occupation: Audio engineer
- Years active: 1953 — present
- Children: son Vladimir

Boris Vladimirovich Vengerovsky (Russian: Борис Владимирович Венгеровский; born 15 September 1931, Moscow) is a Russian and Soviet sound engineer. Laureate of the State Prize of the USSR (1985). Laureate of the Nika Award (1990). Honored Artist of Russia (1997).

== Biography ==
He was born in 1931 in Moscow. Since 1953 at the film studio Mosfilm. He worked as a microphone, assistant sound engineer, since 1964 a sound engineer.

Participated in the creation of films Triumph Over Violence and And Yet I Believe... directed by Mikhail Romm. He worked with Elem Klimov, Sergei Solovyov, Daniil Khrabrovitsky, Nikolai Dostal and others.

Closely collaborated with the directors Alov and Naumov. For his work in the film The Coast was awarded the State Prize of the USSR. And in 1998 he was nominated for the Nika Award for the best work of the sound engineer for his work in the film Choice.

In 1990 he became a laureate of the award Nika Award for his work in Nikolai Skuibin's film Homeless. Without a Fixed Place of Residence.

In our time, is engaged in dubbing foreign films.

== Personal life ==
Was married to actress Tatyana Konyukhova.

Son Vladimir Vengerovsky (1961–2010), the sound engineer at the film studio Mosfilm.

== Selected filmography ==
- Triumph Over Violence (1965)
- July Rain (1966)
- Sofiya Perovskaya (1967)
- Agony (1974)
- Farewell (1983)
