= Lyudmila Shagalova =

Soviet film actress

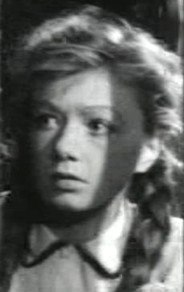
Lyudmila Shagalova(1948)

Lyudmila Alexandrovna Shagalova (Russian: Людмила Александровна Шагалова; April 6, 1923 – March 13, 2012) was a Russian film supporting actress, active during the Soviet era. She was named a People's Artist of Russia in 1977.

Shagalova was born in Rahačoŭ, Gomel Governorate, Russian SFSR, now Belarus. Her Soviet cinema credits include The Young Guard in 1948, for which she and rest of the film's cast won a Stalin Prize. Other films include Balzaminov's Marriage in 1964, and the Wounded Game in 1977. Her husband Vyacheslav Shumsky (1921–2011) was an award-winning cinematographer.

Shagalova died on March 13, 2012, at the age of 88. Moscow Mayor Sergey Sobyanin released a statement in response to her death saying, "An actress of great talent who had a considerable impact on the history of the national film art. Many generations will always love the images created by her."

== Partial filmography ==
- Semiklassniki (1938) - Lyolya
- The Young Guard (1948) - Valeriya Borts
- Proshchay, Amerika! (1949)
- Vernye druz'ya (1954) - Katya
- Isini chamovidnen mtidan (1954) - Nastia Bulanova
- Hastseatiroj voronumnere (1955) - Natasha
- Delo N. 306 (1956) - Lyudmila
- 'Ryadom s nami (1958) - Nina
- Tsel ego zhizni (1958) - Nina Kostrova
- Ya vam pishu... (1959)
- Ne imey 100 rubley... (1959) - Koretskaya
- Rovesnik veka (1960) - Dusya
- Duel (1961) - Nadezhda Fyodorovna
- Samye pervye (1962) - Vera Kalugina
- 713 Requests Permission to Land (1962) - Teresa
- Yabloko razdora (1962)
- Samyy medlennyy poezd (1963) - Varvara, aktrisa
- A Tale of Lost Times (1964) - old Marousia
- Khotite - verte, khotite - net... (1964) - Galya
- Balzaminov's Marriage (1965) - mother of Balzaminov
- Ot semi do dvenadtsati (1965) - Natasha
- Malchik i devochka (1966) - Woman in Kimono
- Dyadushkin son (1966) - Zyablova
- Out of Boredom [«Скуки ради»] (1968) - Sofia Ivanovna
- 13 porucheniy (1969)
- Odin iz nas (1971) - Musya
- Ostrov sokrovishch (1972) - Mrs. Hawkins
- Boy s tenyu (1972)
- Dacha (1973) - Mariya Mikhalovna sosedka po dacha
- Privalov's Millions (1973) - Khionia Zaplatina
- ...A vy lyubili kogda-nibud? (1975)
- It Can't Be! (1975) - mother of Catherine
- Neznakomy naslednik (1976) - Alevtina - maty Sergeya
- Au-u! (1976) - (segment "Chto nasha zhizn'!? ili Chto nasha zhizn'!?")
- Wounded Game (1977) - Nina Grigorievna
- Rudin (1977)
- Mustached Nanny (1978) - Marina Mikhalchuk
- Posledniy shans (1978)
- Poka bezumstvuyet mechta (1978)
- Vzroslyy syn (1979)
- Sakhli lesnayaze (1980)
- Ledyanaya vnuchka (1980) - Grandma / Großmutter Katerina
- Sitsilianskaya zashchita (1981) - Anna Lebedeva
- Noch na chetvyortom kruge (1981)
- Inoplanetyanka (1984) - Mother
- Tantsploshchadka (1986) - Mariya Nikolaevna
- Ssuda na brak (1987)
- Where is the Nophelet? (1988) - Yelena Arkadyevna (final film role)
