= Sergey Migitsko =

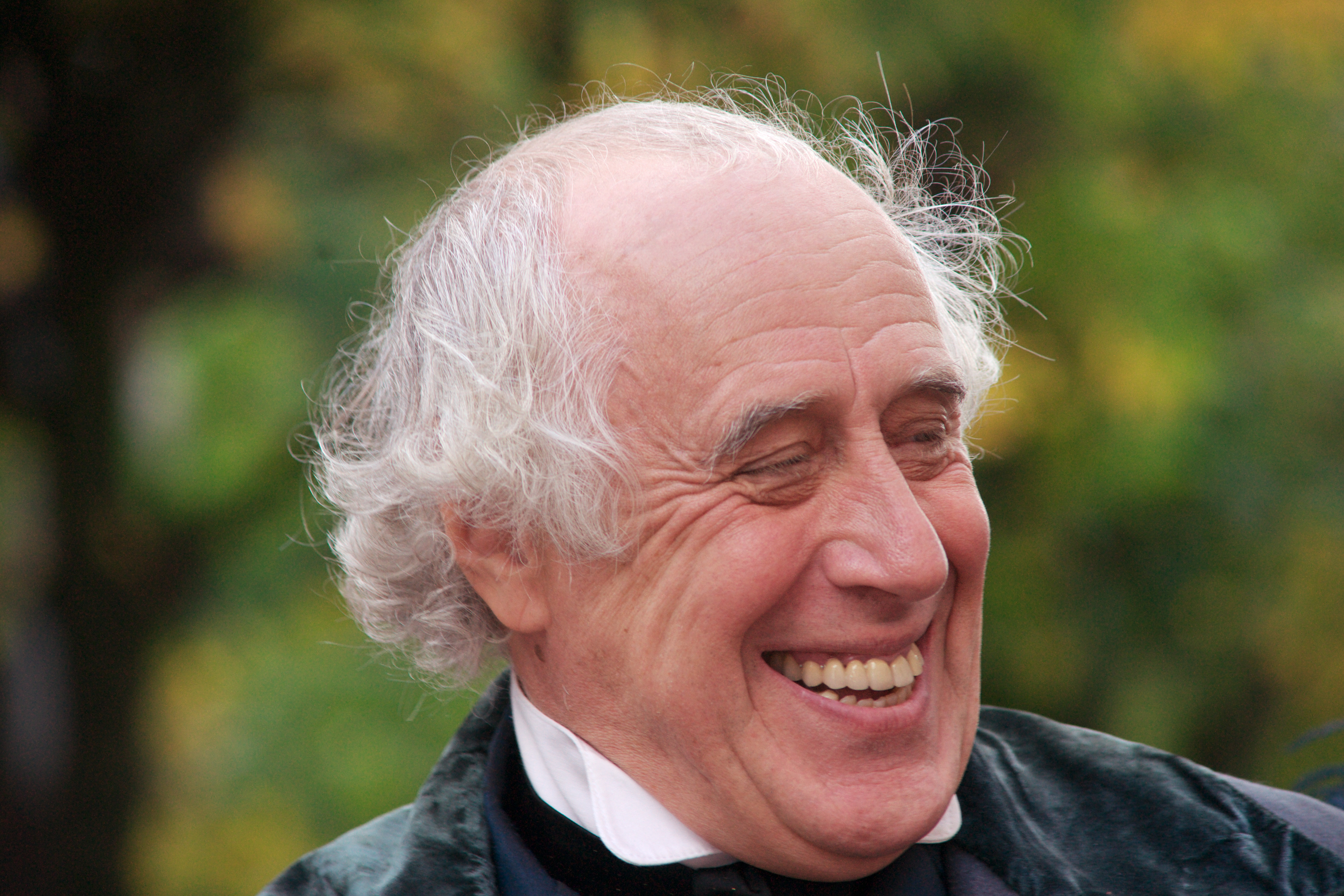
- Sergey Migitsko, while filming "Chagal - Malevich" in Vitebsk
- Born: Sergey Grigorievich Migitsko; April 23, 1953 (age 73); Odessa, Soviet Union
- Occupation: Actor
- Years active: 1974 — present
- Awards: (1991) (1998)

Sergey Grigorievich Migitsko (Russian: Серге́й Григо́рьевич Мигицко́; born April 23, 1953) is a Soviet and Russian film and theater actor, TV presenter, Honored Artist of the RSFSR (1991), People's Artist of Russia (1998).

== Selected filmography ==
- 1974 — Dear Boy as Bill
- 1974 — The Straw Hat as Boben
- 1976 — Sentimental Romance as Syomka Gorodnitsky
- 1977 — Incognito from St. Petersburg as Khlestakov
- 1991 — Viva Gardes-Marines! as Jacques-Joachim Trotti, marquis de La Chétardie
- 1992 — The Chekist as Captain Klimenko's relative
- 1997 — To whom will God send as Arkady
- 1999 — Streets of Broken Lights as Strizhinsky
- 2005 — Doktor Zhivago as Gordon
- 2006 — Travesty as Savsky
- 2006 — Andersen. Life Without Love as Hans Christian Andersen / Christian X of Denmark
- 2011 — Secrets of Investigation as master
- 2013 — Chagall — Malevich as Israel Vishnyak
- 2013 — Sherlock Holmes as Philip McIntyre
- 2024 — Fedya. Narodnyy futbolist as doctor
