= Timofey Lebeshev =

Soviet cinematographer (1905–81)

- Born: February 20, 1905; Russian Empire
- Died: August 1, 1981 (aged 77); USSR
- Occupation: Cinematographer
- Years active: 1939-1979

Timofey Pavlovich Lebeshev (Russian: Тимофeй Павлович Лeбeшeв; February 20, 1905 — August 1, 1981) was a Soviet cinematographer. He became an Honored Artist of the RSFSR in 1965 and Honored Artist of the Buryat Autonomous Soviet Socialist Republic in 1976. Also awarded of the Medal For Labor Valor (1974).

In 1931, he graduated from the State College of Cinematography. He was director of the film studio Mostehfilm, then Mosfilm.

His son, Pavel Lebeshev, was a Soviet and Russian cinematographer.

== Selected filmography ==
- 1936: Party Ticket (second operator)
- 1939: A Girl with a Temper
- 1943: Bir Ailə
- 1950: Cossacks of the Kuban (together with Valentin Pavlov)
- 1955: The Crash of the Emirate
- 1956: Early Joys
- 1957: An Unusual Summer
- 1960: Michman Panin
- 1961: The Girls
- 1963: Silence
- 1964: The Hockey Players
- 1968: The Shield and the Sword
- 1979: Adult Son
