= The Killers (1956 film) =

1956 Soviet short film

- Title card
- Directed by: Marika Beiku; Aleksandr Gordon; Andrei Tarkovsky
- Screenplay by: Aleksandr Gordon; Andrei Tarkovsky
- Based on: "The Killers"; 1927 story by Ernest Hemingway
- Starring: Yuli Fait; Aleksandr Gordon; Valentin Vinogradov; Andrei Tarkovsky; Vasily Shukshin
- Cinematography: Alfredo Alvarez; Aleksandr Rybin
- Release date: 1956 (USSR)
- Running time: 19 minutes
- Country: Soviet Union
- Language: Russian

The Killers (Russian: Убийцы, translit. Ubiytsy) is a 1956 student film by the Soviet and Russian film director Andrei Tarkovsky and his fellow students Marika Beiku and Aleksandr Gordon. The film is based on the short story "The Killers" by Ernest Hemingway, written in 1927. It was Tarkovsky's first film, produced when he was a student at the Gerasimov Institute of Cinematography (VGIK).

== Plot ==
The Killers is an adaptation of a short story by Ernest Hemingway. The story is divided into three scenes. The first and third scenes were directed by Beiku and Tarkovsky, the second by Gordon.

The first scene shows Nick Adams (Yuli Fait) observing two gangsters (Valentin Vinogradov and Vadim Novikov) in black coats and black hats entering a small-town diner where Adams is eating. They tell the owner, George (Aleksandr Gordon), that they are searching for the boxer Ole Andreson and that they want to kill him. They tie up Nick Adams and Sam the cook, and wait for Ole Andreson to appear. Three customers enter the restaurant and are sent away by George. One of the customers is played by Tarkovsky, who whistles "Lullaby of Birdland".

The second scene shows Nick Adams visiting Ole Andreson (Vasily Shukshin) in his hide-out, a small room. He warns Andreson about the two gangsters, but Andreson is resigned to his fate and unwilling to flee.

The third scene shows Adams returning to the diner and informing the owner of Andreson's decision.

== Cast ==
- Yuli Fait as Nick Adams
- Aleksandr Gordon as George
- Valentin Vinogradov as Al
- Vadim Novikov as Max
- Yuri Dubrovin as 1st Customer
- Andrei Tarkovsky as 2nd Customer
- Vasily Shukshin as Ole Andreson
- Ermengeld Konovalov as Sam the cook

== Production ==
Students were required to work on films in groups of two or threes due to a lack of equipment at the film school VGIK. Andrei Tarkovsky and Aleksandr Gordon asked Marika Beiku to work with them. The idea for adapting Ernest Hemingway's short story was Tarkovsky's. All roles were played by students of the VGIK, and the camera and lighting was handled by fellow students Alfredo Álvarez and Aleksandr Rybin.

Beiku, Gordon and Tarkovsky set up an American bar in the studio of the film school, at this time a symbol of depravity and becoming a minor attraction among students. Props were brought by students from their homes, and from relatives and friends. The film was praised by Mikhail Romm, the professor and teacher of Beiku, Gordon and Tarkovsky.

== See also ==
=== Other adaptations of the Hemingway story ===
- The Killers (1946 film), directed by Robert Siodmak
- The Killers (1964 film), directed by Don Siegel
