= Sovetsky Soyuz =

Soviet magazine

Sovétsky Soyúz (Russian: Сове́тский Сою́з, lit. 'Soviet Union') was a magazine published by the Soviet Union. The magazine was established in 1956. It was one of the propaganda magazines of the Soviet Union. There were editions published in France, Italy, Finland and Japan. The magazine had a monthly sports supplement, Sport v SSSR.
