= Lyube =

Russian rock band

Lube
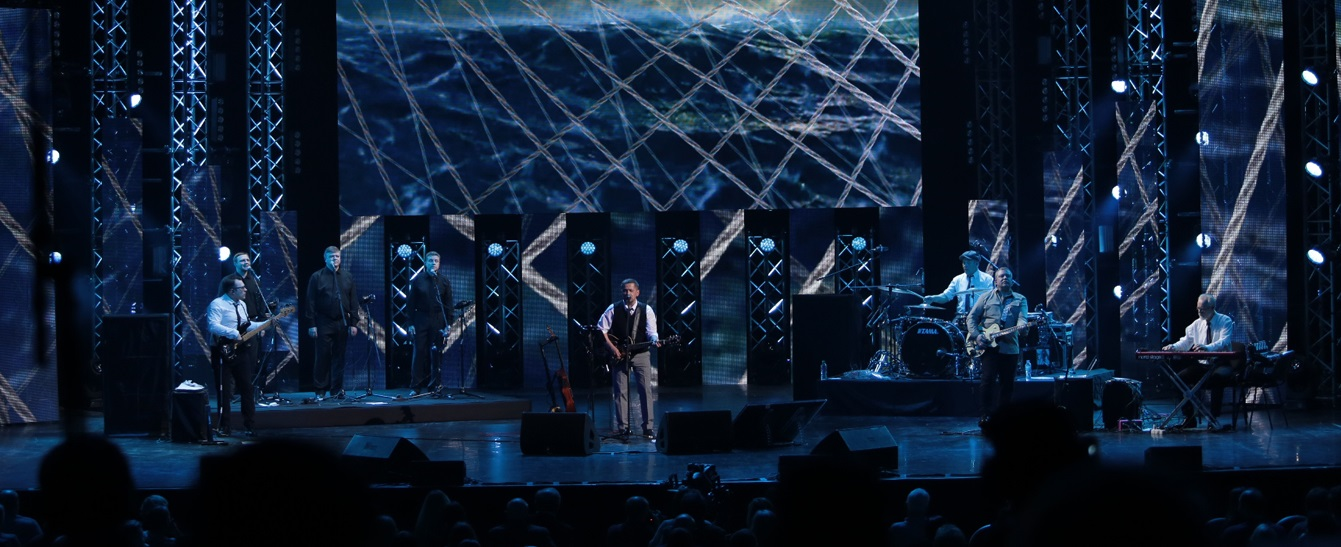
- Lube performing in 2017

Background information
- Also known as: Любэ; Lubeh
- Origin: Lyubertsy, Soviet Union
- Genres: Rock; author song; chanson
- Years active: 1989–present
- Labels: Melodiya; Igor Matvienko Production Center; SNC
- Members: Nikolay Rastorguyev; for other members see Members
- Website: www.lubeh.matvey.ru

Lyube (Russian: Любэ́, IPA: [lʲʉˈbɛ]) is a Russian rock band from Lyubertsy, a city in Moscow Oblast. Lyube's music is a mixture of several genres, with influences from both Russian folk music, rock, Russian chanson, and Soviet military songs. The band was founded in 1989, and since then have released sixteen albums. Lyube's producer and main songwriter is Igor Matviyenko.

== History ==
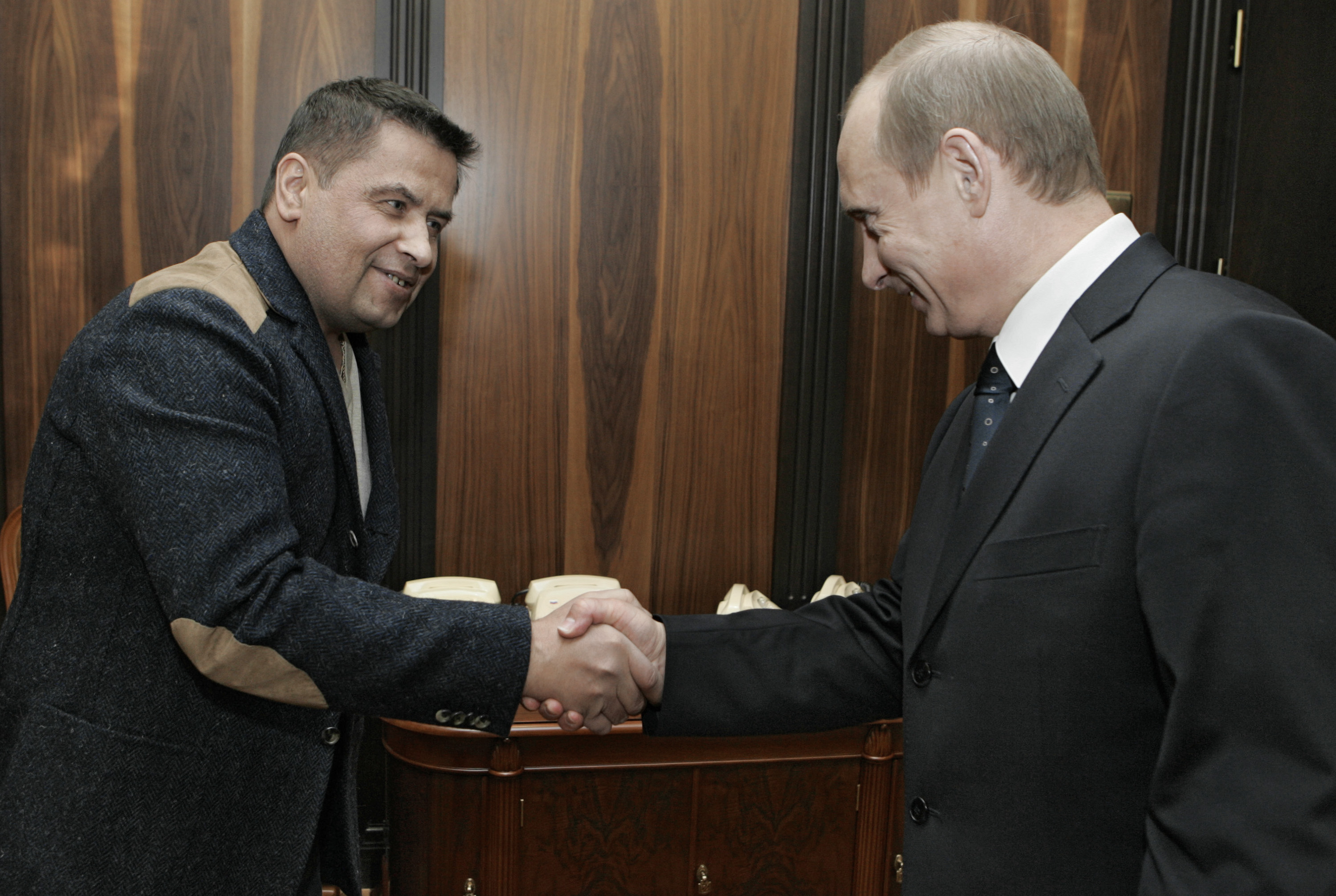
Lyube singer Nikolay Rastorguyev meets Russian president Vladimir Putin, a fan of the band

Igor Matviyenko was a music producer and composer working at the Soviet music studio SPM Record when he came up with the idea to start Lyube in 1988. Rastorguyev came up with the band's name.

=== Early 1990s: Debut and rise to fame ===
The band released its first compilation of songs in 1990, titled "We will now live a new way" (Russian: Мы будем жить теперь по-новому).

Lyube logo

In 1991, Lyube released its first official LP. The debut album was titled "Atas" (Russian: Атас), and included the title song, along with the songs "Bat'ko Makhno" (Russian: Батька Махно), "Taganskaya station" (Russian: Станция Таганская), "Don't destroy, you men" (Russian: Не губите, мужики), and "Lyubertsy" (Russian: Люберцы).

Lyube filmed their first music video in 1991 in the Russian city of Sochi, using "Don't play the fool, America!" as the song.

In 1992, Lyube released its second album, titled "Who said that we lived badly...?" (Russian: Кто сказал, что мы плохо жили..?). The songs for the album were recorded at the Moscow Palace of Youth and Stas Namin's Studio, and the mastering was completed at studio MSM in Munich, Germany. The album included such hits as "Come, let's play" (Russian: Давай наяривай), "Don't play the fool, America!" (Russian: Не Валяй Дурака, Америка), "Rabbit fur", "Tram five" (Russian: Трамвай пятерочка), and "Old Noble" (Russian: Старый барин). Around the release of the second album, Aleksandr Vaynberg and Oleg Zenin left the band.

=== Mid-1990s: Pinnacle of success ===
Lyube's follow-up to their sophomore effort took two years to complete. The new album was titled "Lyube Zone" (Russian: Зона Любэ), which was a play on words as the term "zone" has a secondary meaning that refers to a camp for convicts. In 1995, Lyube recorded the song "Kombat" (Russian: Комбат). The song has a military feel to it and chronicles episodes from World War II.

=== Late 1990s: Retrospectives, covers, and soundtracks ===
In 1997, Rastorguyev became a "Recognized Artist of the Russian Federation" (Russian: Заслуженный Артист Российской Федерации), the second-highest honor for a singer in Russia, awarded by the country's president. In early 1998, Lyube took part in a concert celebrating the Russian singer Vladimir Vysotsky, where they covered two of Vysotsky's hits: "On soldiers' mass graves" (Russian: На братских могилах) and "Song about stars" (Russian: Песня о звёздах).

=== 2001–present ===
In 2001, Lyube played a live concert on Victory Day in Red Square. That same year, Russian president Vladimir Putin, an avowed fan of the band, appointed Rastorguyev to the position of Cultural Advisor to the Russian government.

In 2010, Nikolai Rastorguyev became a deputy of the State Duma of the fifth convocation from the Stavropol Krai, replacing United Russia deputy Sergey Smetanyuk, who was appointed Deputy Plenipotentiary Representative of the President of the Russian Federation in the Ural Federal District. Rastorguyev became a member of the State Duma Committee on Culture. In this regard, the group holds concerts and takes part in actions of the ruling United Russia party and its youth movement, the Young Guard. In the same year, after being in Lyube for ten years, guitarist Alexey Khokhlov left the band.

On 18 March 2022, Lyube sang at Vladimir Putin's Moscow rally celebrating the annexation of Crimea by the Russian Federation from Ukraine and justifying the 2022 Russian invasion of Ukraine.

On 28 June 2024, Lyube's Spotify profile has been terminated as part of EU sanctions.

Guitarist Yuri Rymanov died on 24 January 2026, at the age of 69.

== Members ==
Nearly all songs were composed by Igor Matviyenko (music), Alexander Shaganov (lyrics), and Mikhail Andreyev (lyrics).

=== Current members ===
- Nikolay Rastorguyev – vocals, acoustic and electric guitar (1989–present)
- Aleksey Tarasov – backing vocals (1989–present)
- Alexander Erokhin – drums (1991–present)
- Sergey Pereguda – guitar (1993–present)
- Pavel Suchkov – backing vocals (2012–present), keyboards (2022–present)
- Alexey Kantur – backing vocals (2012–present)
- Dmitry Streltsov – bass (2016–present)
- Alexey Ryabushev – guitar (2024–present)
- Serafim Tarasov – backing vocals (2022-2024, 2026–present)

=== Former members ===
- Vitaly Loktev – keyboards, accordion (1990–2022)
- Anatoly Kuleshov – backing vocals, percussion (1989–2009)
- Alexey Khokhlov – guitar (2000–2010)
- Pavel Usanov – bass (1997–2016)
- Yuri Rymanov – guitar (1998–2009; died 2026)
- Rinat Bakhteyev – drums (1989–1990)
- Alexander Davydov – keyboards (1989–1990)
- Yuri Ripyakh – drums (1990–1991)
- Alexander Vaynberg – bass, guitar (1990–1992)
- Sergey Bashlykov – bass (1991–1993)
- Alexander Nikolayev – bass (1989–1991, 1993–1996)
- Yevgeny Nasibulin – backing vocals, guitar (1991–1996)
- Oleg Zenin – backing vocals (1991–1992)
- Vyacheslav Tereshonok – guitar (1989–1993)
- Viktor Zhuk – guitar (1990–1991)
- Andrey Danilin – bass (1996–1997)
- Ivan Zelenkov – guitar (2022–2024)

There was another backing vocalist who briefly performed in the group in 2012. His name is currently unknown.

== Discography ==
Vladimir Putin and Dmitry Medvedev on 2 March 2008, the day of Russian presidential election. The soundtrack while they walk is Lyube's Davay za. Lyube is Putin's favourite band

Studio albums

- Атас (Atas, slang for "alert" — 1991)
- Кто сказал, что мы плохо жили..? (Kto skazal, chto my plokho zhili...?, "Who said that we lived badly?" — 1992)
- Зона Любэ (Zona lyube, "Lyube zone" — 1994)
- Комбат (Kombat, "battalion commander" — 1996)
- Песни о людях (Pesni o ludyakh, "songs about people" — 1997)
- Полустаночки (Polustanochki, "Whistle-stops" — 2000)
- Давай за... (Davay za..., "Come on..." — 2002)
- Рассея (Rasseya, "Russia" with a typically patriotic spelling variation — 2005)
- Свои (Svoi, "our people" — 2009)
- За тебя, Родина-мать! (Za tebya, Rodina-mat' , "For you, Motherland!" - 2015)

Collections

- Собрание сочинений (Sobranie sochineniy, "collected works" — 1997)
- Собрание сочинений. Том 2 (Sobranie sochineniy, Tom 2, "collected works, volume 2" — 2001)
- Собрание сочинений. Том 3 (Sobranie sochinenyi. Tom 3, "collected works volume 3" — 2008)
- Ребята нашего полка (Rebyata nashego polka, "the guys from our regiment" — 2004)
- 55 (2012)
- Лучшие песни 1989-2015 (Luchshie pesni 1989-2015, "best songs 1989-2015" — 2015)
- Своё (Svoyo, "own" — 2022)

Concert/Live albums

- Песни из концертной программы "Песни о людях" 24.02.98 (Pesni iz kontsertnoy programmy "Pesni o ludyakh" ("From the concert programs of 'Songs about people'", two-disc concert recording — 1998)
- Юбилей. Лучшие песни (Yubilej. Luchshiye Pesni, "anniversary, best of", two-disc concert recording — 2002)
- В России (V Rossiyi, "in Russia" — 2007)
