= Call Me from Afar =

1977 film directed by German Lavrov and Stanislav Lyubshin

- Russian: Позови меня в даль светлую
- Directed by: German Lavrov; Stanislav Lyubshin
- Written by: Stanislav Lyubshin; Vasily Shukshin
- Starring: Lidiya Fedoseeva-Shukshina; Stanislav Lyubshin; Mikhail Ulyanov; Ivan Ryzhov; Vladimir Naumenko
- Cinematography: Yuri Avdeyev; Vladimir Fridkin
- Edited by: Roza Rogatkina
- Music by: Yuri Butsko
- Release date: 1977
- Running time: 97 minute
- Country: Soviet Union
- Language: Russian

Call Me from Afar (Russian: Позови меня в даль светлую) is a 1977 Soviet romantic drama film directed by German Lavrov and Stanislav Lyubshin.

== Plot ==
In a small Russian town on the outskirts, in a tidy three-room house, lives a woman named Agrippina Ignatievna Veselova, known simply as Grusha. She is 34 years old, with a twelve-year-old son, Vitka, and a brother, Nikolai Ignatievich, who works as the chief accountant at a local state farm. Her husband had left her three years earlier, saying that family life interfered with his drinking.

Grusha’s brother, wanting to see her married again, introduces her to an old friend who seems to have overcome his struggles with alcohol and now appears to be a steady and reliable man. However, Grusha feels nothing for him—she finds him dull and uninspiring. When the matchmaking fails, she explains simply, “My heart’s just not in it.”

== Cast ==
- Lidiya Fedoseeva-Shukshina as Grusha Veselova
- Stanislav Lyubshin as Vladimir Nikolayevich
- Mikhail Ulyanov as Nikolay
- Ivan Ryzhov as Savva
- Vladimir Naumenko as Vitya (as Voloda Naumenko)
- Oleg Novikov as Yura
- Tatyana Aleksandrova
- Nikolai Brilling as Kuzma Yegorovich (as N. Brilling)
- Lidiya Dranovskaya
- Lyudmila Gamuryak as Olya
