= Mustached Nanny =

- Directed by: Vladimir Grammatikov; Lyudmila Shagalova; Elizaveta Uvarova
- Written by: Andrei Veitsler; Aleksandr Misharin
- Starring: Sergei Prokhanov; Lyudmila Shagalova; Elizaveta Uvarova
- Cinematography: Lev Ragozin
- Music by: Alexey Rybnikov
- Production company: Gorky Film Studio
- Release date: 1977
- Running time: 73 minutes
- Country: Soviet Union
- Language: Russian

Mustached Nanny (Russian: Усатый нянь, romanized: Usatiy nyan) is a 1977 Soviet comedy film, feature film directorial debut of Vladimir Grammatikov. The film was a box-office hit, it was seen by 47 million viewers in 1979.

== Plot ==
Jokester Kesha Chetvergov (Sergei Prokhanov), after graduating from school, is not able to find interesting work for himself. He did not get a higher education and failed to stay at any job for longer than two weeks. Most of his time he spends by messing around with his immature friends Bublik (Valery Kislenko), Motyl (Felix Krol) and Ponchik (Sergey Bachursky).

Eventually, the district policeman Yevseyev (Vadim Aleksandrov), who previously sympathized with the guy and helped him with finding work, finally loses his patience and calls Innokenty to a meeting of the committee of lay judges at the Housing Committee, where his fate is to be decided.

The public is determined to take serious measures against the young man as a parasite, but kindergarten director Marina Borisovna Mikhalchuk (Lyudmila Shagalova) stands up for him.

Marina Borisovna convinces the assessors to give Chetvergov another chance to correct his behavior and employs Kesha in her kindergarten as a night shift nanny.

== Cast ==
- Sergei Prokhanov as Innokenty Petrovich Chetvergov (Kesha)
- Lyudmila Shagalova as Marina Borisovna Mikhalchuk, director of the kindergarten
- Elizaveta Uvarova as Arina Rodionovna, nurse

=== Friends of Kesha ===
- Sergey Bachursky as Petya
- Valery Kislenko as Dima
- Felix Krol as Vasya

=== Members of the Commission on difficult adolescents ===
- Valentin Bryleev as fellow activist
- Gennady Yalovich as father of Kuroslepov
- Arsen Berzin as comrade-in-arms watching TV
- Bronislava Zakharova as red-haired woman activist
- Tatyana Nikolaeva as female activist in a police uniform
- Vadim Uryupin as red-haired male activist

=== Others ===
- Vadim Aleksandrov as precinct officer Yevseyev
- Nadezhda Samsonova as smart old woman
- Alexander Sazhin as watchman of Kuzya
- Marina Matveenko as stranger
- Natalya Khorokhorina as mother of Barmaleychik
- Vladimir Puchkov
- Olga Grigoryeva
- Klavdia Kozlenkova as Maria Stepanovna, the janitor
- Leonid Trutnev as taxi driver
