= Sentimental Romance (1977 film) =

1976 film

Sentimentalny roman
- Directed by: Igor Maslennikov
- Written by: Igor Maslennikov; Vera Panova
- Starring: Elena Proklova; Yelena Koreneva; Nikolai Denisov; Stanislav Lyubshin; Sergey Migitsko
- Cinematography: Dmitri Meskhiyev
- Edited by: I. Smirnova
- Music by: Vladimir Dashkevich
- Release date: 1977
- Country: Soviet Union
- Language: Russian

Sentimental Romance (Russian: Сентиментальный роман, romanized: Sentimentalny roman) is a 1976 Soviet romantic drama directed by Igor Maslennikov. It was entered into the 27th Berlin International Film Festival.

== Plot ==
The film is set in the 1920s. Shura Sevastyanov is an aspiring journalist in a small newspaper, with two-classes of a parochial school behind him. In the spirit of building communism, he is an ardent fighter against philistinism in all its forms. He denies the phenomenon of love, believing that it does not exist and that there is only friendship and sexual desire of man to woman.

Shura socializes with two friends who are nicknamed as Big Zoe and Little Zoe. Shura teaches Little Zoe, the one in love with him, the ideas of communism. He despises the beautiful Big Zoe because of her philistinism, her love for beautiful things and for her selfishness.

Suddenly Shura falls in love with Big Zoe and invites her to live together. She agrees, leaving her petty-bourgeois family behind, which tried to force her to marry an unpleasant person. The idyll is destroyed when Zoe finds a job in a cafe, which is located across the street from their home. Shura is at first indignant at Zoe's act, but then decides that it is all for the better.

When he visits the café, Shura meets a storekeeper who tries to warn him about the dangers which lie in the cafe for Zoe. Shura is alarmed, and when the chief editor invites him to go to Margaritovku and collect material there, Shura refuses and instead suggests Andrey Cushla's name for the task. Andrey is a native of Margaritovka, and his older brother is the chairman of a collective farm here. He gladly accepts.

But the kulaks, who have seized power in the village kill Andrey. Shura goes to his funeral in Margaritovka, and when he returns, learns that Zoe has left him and ran away with the cafe's storekeeper, in addition to taking a vast sum of money from the cash register.

Zoe's brother comes to Shura and informs him that Zoe was arrested because of the storekeeper who turned out to be a bandit. Shura goes to Ilya Gorodnitsky, the prosecutor who leads the case. Gorodnitsky is the elder brother of Syomka, Shura's sidekick. Gorodnitsky quickly lets Zoe go, but she does not return to Sevastyanov: the prosecutor, who is clearly fascinated by the beauty of Zoe, invites her to live in his family.

Shura decides to find Little Zoe. He learns from a pioneer of her party that she left but that she will be back soon. He goes to the station to meet Zoe and witnesses Gorodnitsky's departure, his wife and Big Zoe.

== Cast ==
- Elena Proklova as Big Zoya
- Elena Koreneva as Little Zoya
- Nikolai Denisov as Shura Sevastianov
- Stanislav Lyubshin as Andrey Kushlia
- Sergey Migitsko as Siomka Gorodnitskiy
- Tamara Abrosimova as Zoe's little mother
- Vladimir Basov as Father
- Ivan Bortnik as Stock controller café
- Mikhail Boyarsky as Akopian - newspaper editor
- Lyudmila Dmitriyeva as Ksania
- Boris Galkin as Stepan
- Lyudmila Gurchenko as Mariya Petruchenko
- Nikolai Karachentsov as brother Zoe's big
- Marina Maltseva
- Vladimir Markov as Vassili Nikolayevich, Zoya's father
- Anna Maslennikova as Marussia
- Vadim Mikhajlov
- Natalya Nazarova as Liza, Andrey's wife
- Oleg Yankovsky as Ilya Gorodnitsky, brother Siomka
