= Tatyana Konyukhova =

Soviet actress (1931–2024)

- Татьяна Конюхова
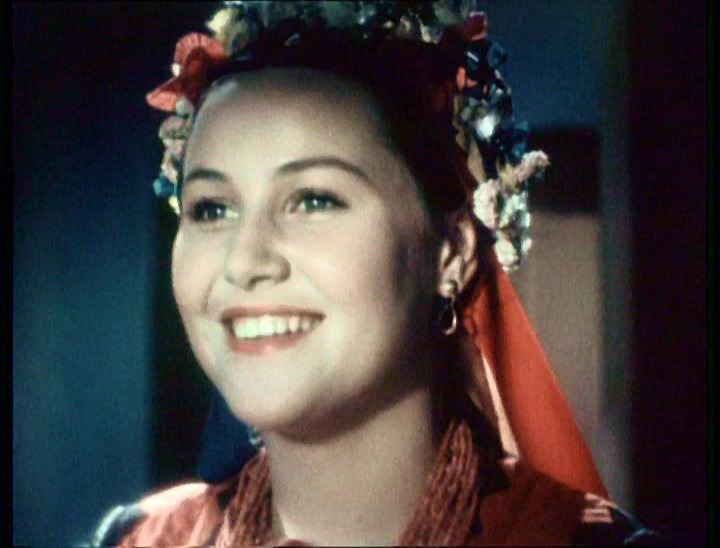
- Konyukhova in 1952
- Born: Tatyana Georgyevna Konyukhova; 12 November 1931; Tashkent, Uzbek SSR, USSR
- Died: 2 April 2024 (aged 92); Moscow, Russia
- Occupation: Actress
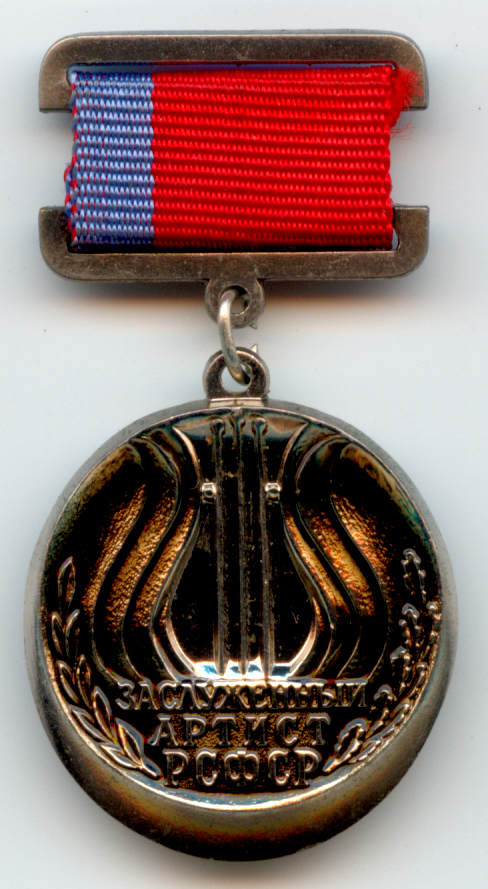
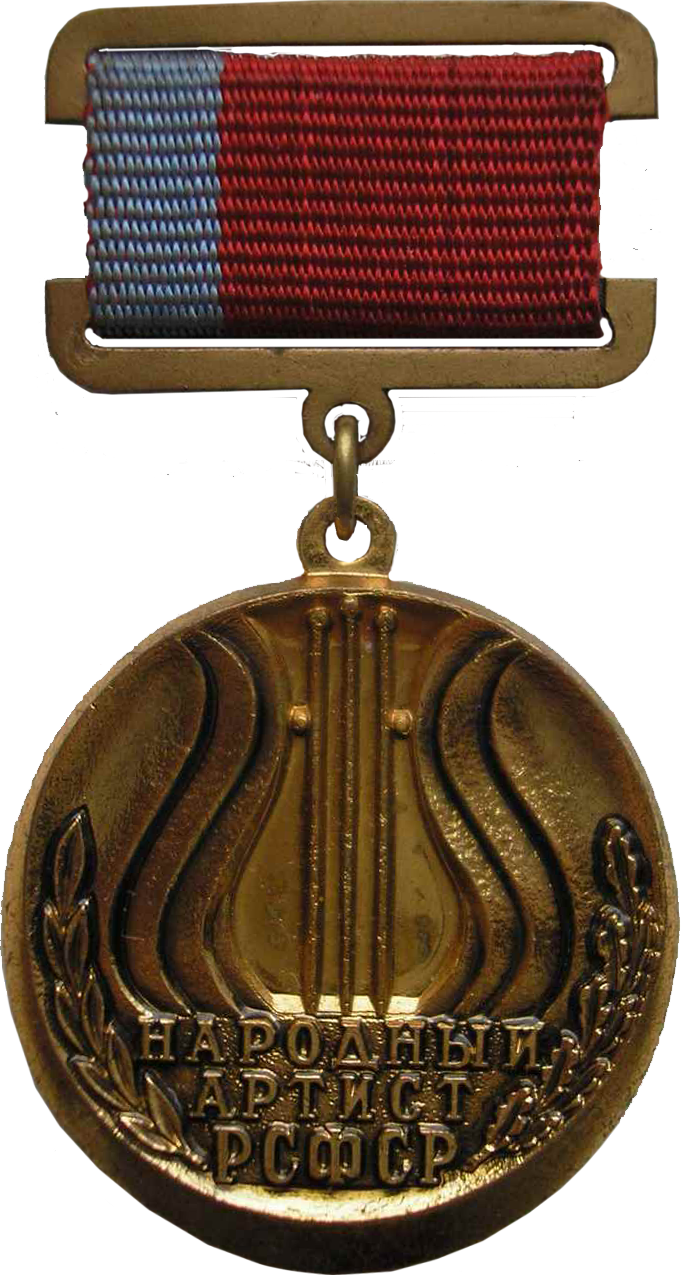
- Awards

Tatyana Georgyevna Konyukhova (Russian: Татья́на Гео́ргиевна Ко́нюхова; 12 November 1931 – 2 April 2024) was a Soviet actress. People's Artist of the RSFSR (1991). She was also a Member of the CPSU from 1967.

== Biography ==
Tatyana Konyukhova was born on 12 November 1931 in Tashkent (Uzbek SSR). Her father hailed from Ladyzhenki near Poltava and her mother was from Zolochiv in Kharkiv. Her grandfather was an agronomist at the Tereshchenko estate, a very large sugar producer.

In 1946, her father was sent to work in Latvia, and the family moved to Riga. In 1949 she left, went to Moscow and entered VGIK (Boris Bibikov's and Olga Pyzhova's workshop), despite her father's belief that she was doomed to failure. Quite contrary to her father's misgivings, however, she performed very well there, both academically and theatrically, and soon attracted film directors' attention.

As a second-year student, she made her debut in cinema in the film by Alexander Rou May Night, or the Drowned Maiden. In 1955, she graduated from University and worked briefly in Maly Theatre. In the years 1956–1992 she was an actress at the National Film Actors' Theatre.

From 1964, Konyukhova was a member of the Committee of the Lenin Prize in literature and art. From 1969, she was a member of the Central Committee of the Trade Union of Workers of Culture.

Konyukhova died on 2 April 2024, at the age of 92.

== Family ==
- Her first husband – a student of film studies faculty of VGIK Valeri Karen (later — editor association Mosfilm).
- The second husband – a sound engineer Boris Vengerovsky.
- The third husband – a 4-time champion of the USSR (1953, 1954, 1958, 1961), a javelin thrower, a doctor of pedagogical sciences, Vladimir Kuznetsov.
  - Son – Sergey Kuznetsov, a Foreign Ministry employee.
    - Granddaughter – Olga, engaged in synchronized swimming.

== Selected filmography ==
- 1951 – Sporting Honour
- 1952 – May Nights, or the Drowned
- 1953 – Marina's Destiny
- 1955 – The Boys from Leningrad
- 1955 – Volnitsa
- 1955 – Good Morning
- 1956 – Different Fates
- 1957 – An Unusual Summer
- 1958 – Over Tissa
- 1958 – Oleko Dundich
- 1961 – Dima Gorin's Career
- 1962 – Beat the Drum!
- 1964 – Balzaminov's Marriage
- 1964 – Executions at Dawn
- 1967 – The Red and the White
- 1968 – The Mysterious Monk
- 1972 – Nights Chronicle
- 1979 – Moscow Does Not Believe in Tears
- 1981 – A Painter's Wife Portrait
- 1986 – On the Porch Sat With Gold
- 1990 – All Ahead
- 1995 – Pacific Angel Flying
- 2008 – Three with Carronade Square
- 2011 – Stored Fate
