= Nikolay Rastorguyev =

Russian singer and politician (born 1957)

- Николай Расторгуев
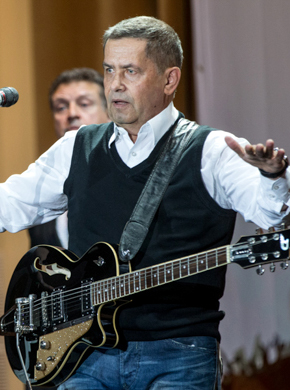
- Rastorguyev in 2016
- Born: February 21, 1957 (age 69); Lytkarino, Moscow Oblast, Soviet Union
- Occupations: Singer; member of the State Duma
- Years active: Since 1978
- Title: People's Artist of Russia (2002)
- Awards: Order "For Merit to the Fatherland" (4th class); Order of Honour
- Musical career
- Genres: Folk rock; Russian chanson; soft rock; folk; hard rock
- Instruments: Vocals; acoustic; electric guitar
- Member of: Lyube

Nikolay Vyacheslavovich Rastorguyev (Russian: Николай Вячеславович Расторгуев; born 21 February 1957) is a Russian singer and politician and the lead singer of the Russian group Lyube.

== Biography ==
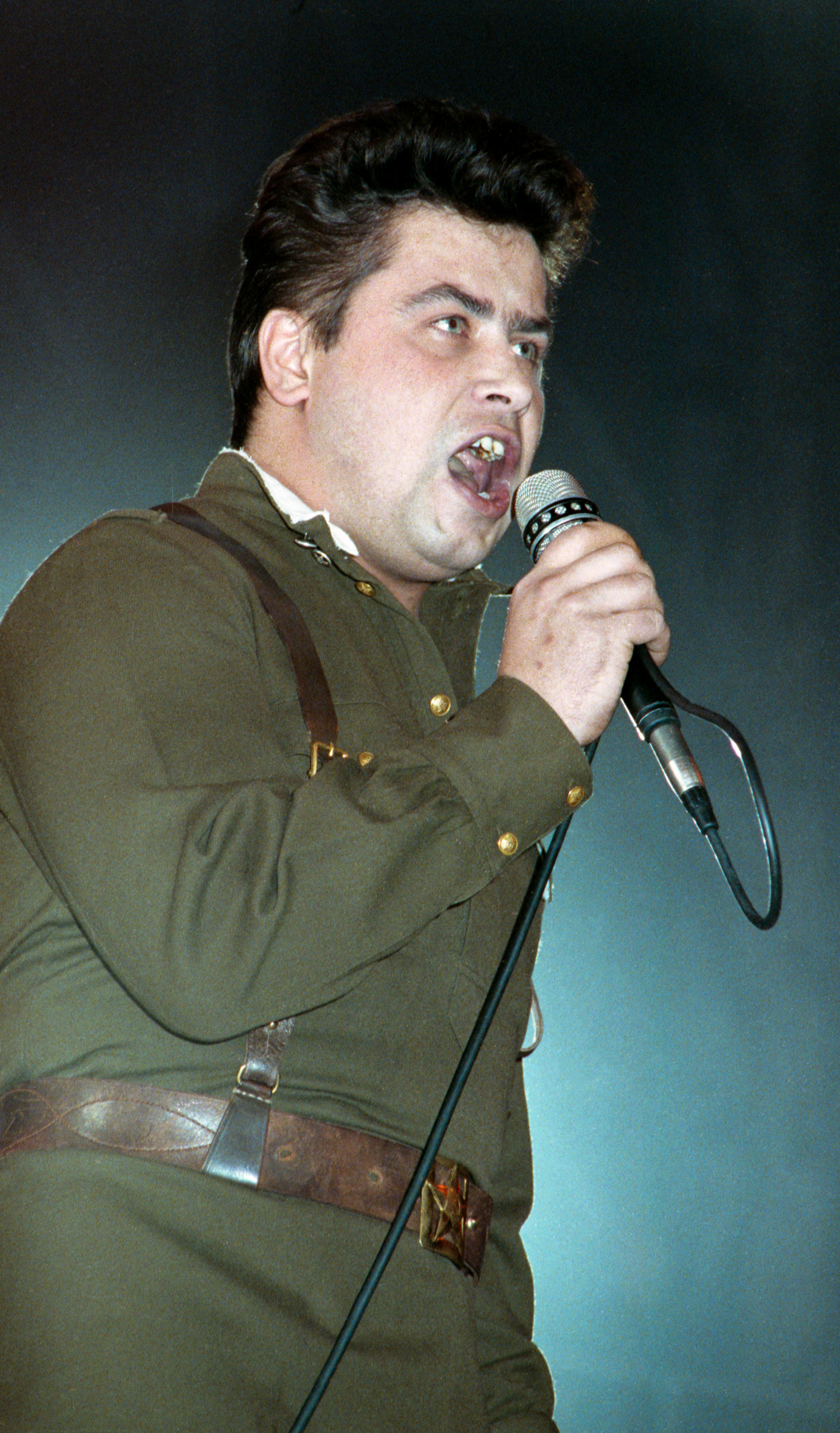
Rastorguyev performing in January 1991, wearing his trademark World War II-era gymnastyorka.

In 1978, Nikolay was the soloist for the band (VIA in Russian) Шестеро молодых, but his first note came during his 1980–1985 stint in the band Lyeysya, Pyesnya. After Leysya Pesnya split, Rastorguyev spent a year in the band Rondo before joining newly formed Lyube. Since then, Nikolay remains the band's only permanent member.

In 1997, Rastorguyev was given the honorary title People's Artist of Russia. On the occasion of his 50th birthday in 2007, Russian President Vladimir Putin awarded Nikolay with the state order "For Merit to the Fatherland", fourth class. Rastorguyev became a member of the Russian Duma in 2010 as a representative of the ruling party United Russia.

In March 2014, Rastorguyev signed a letter supporting the results of the people of the Crimean peninsula's referendum, that came out to be overwhelmingly supporting to go back of being part of Russia. For "statements contradicted the interests of our national security" he was then banned from entering Ukraine. In April and May 2022, Rastorguyev participated in a series of concerts organized in order to support the 2022 Russian invasion of Ukraine. He is subject to sanctions imposed on him by the EU for his role in "the Kremlin's disinformation and information manipulation ecosystem".
