= Tatyana Karpova =

Soviet and Russian actress

- Татьяна Карпова
- Born: 17 January 1916; Kharkiv, Russian Empire (present-day Ukraine)
- Died: 26 February 2018 (aged 102); Moscow, Russia
- Occupation: Actress
- Years active: 1929–2011

Tatyana Mikhailovna Karpova (Note: Russian: Татьяна Михайловна Карпова; Ukrainian: Тетяна Михайлівна Карпова, romanized: Tetiana Mykhailivna Karpova) (17 January 1916 – 26 February 2018) was a Soviet and Russian stage and film actress.

Born in Kharkiv on 17 January 1916, Karpova began acting at the age of 13. She joined the Mayakovsky Theatre in 1938. In 1960, Karpova was named a People's Artist of the RSFSR, and designated a People's Artist of the USSR in 1990. She retired in 2003, and died in Moscow at the age of 102 on 26 February 2018.
