= Aleksandr Gordon =

Soviet filmmaker and Russian author (1931–2020)

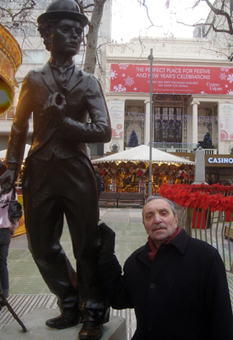
- Gordon in 2007
- Born: Alexander Vitalievich Gordon; 26 December 1931; Moscow, Russian SFSR
- Died: 7 December 2020 (aged 88); Paris, France
- Occupations: Filmmaker, author
- Years active: 1956–2020
- Notable work: Sergey Lazo (1968 film); Scenes from Family Life (1979 film)

Aleksandr Vitalyevich Gordon (Russian: Алексaндр Витaльевич Гордoн; pronunciation: ahlekSAHNDer viTAHLyevitch gorDOAN) (26 December 1931 – 7 December 2020) was a Soviet filmmaker and Russian author.

== Biography ==
Gordon was a classmate of Andrey Tarkovskiy at the All-Russian State Institute of Cinematography (VGIK), in the directing department taught by Mikhail Romm, graduating in 1960. In workshops involving classmates from different areas of study, the students collaborated on several projects, Gordon and Tarkovskiy co-directing and co-writing their first two student short films together (1956 and 1959), Gordon also appearing in both. He was a member of the Russian Cinematographers Union (CPSU) since 1953.

While at VGIK he married Tarkovskiy's younger sister Marina Arsenyevna Tarkovskaya, a writer and linguist. They had two children: Mikhail Aleksandrovich Tarkovskiy (born 1958), a writer, cinematographer, biologist, and fur trapper living off the land in the eastern Siberian taiga, and Ekaterina (Katya) Aleksandrovna Tarkovskaya, an actress since childhood.

Gordon made 9 feature films in the USSR, of which four from the 1960s and 70s are highly acclaimed. From 1964-1970 he worked at the Moldova Film studios, where he directed the films The Last Night in Paradise, Sergey Lazo, and Theft. In the late 1970s through the 80s, he made films in the genre of a tough crime-adventure, rare for the pre-perestroika Soviet Union: Skirmish in a Blizzard, Double Passing, Ransom, which allowed a violent confrontation between a criminal and a citizen of the "era of developed socialism". Until his death, he was the director of the Mosfilm studios, where in the mid-1980s he provided Russian dubbing voices for Andrei Tarkovskiy's films shot abroad: Nostalghia and The Sacrifice. He directed his last feature film in 1990, about a Football Player. In 1994 he and his wife wrote a film documentary and dramatization about Andrei Tarkovskiy's year in the Siberian taiga that led to Andrei's decision to become a filmmaker. The script includes an adaptation of Tarkovskiy's unpublished screenplay treatment The Concentrate, a dramatized account of his taiga research trip, written as Tarkovskiy's entrance examination to VGIK the following year.

After the collapse of the Soviet Union, he continued as director of the new Mosfilm, stopped directing films himself and instead turned to writing, authoring three books, beginning in 2006 with a memoir of Tarkovskiy "Unquenched Thirst". His second book was released on his 80th birthday; called "Hungarian Flying Shot", it was in the form of fictional prose about his years in the army. His last book was published in 2016, entitled "Tucherez, or the Incredible is Likely" (a "tucherez" is a kind of skyscraper), written as a fantasy conversation between two filmmakers, Sergei Eisenstein and Andrei Tarkovskiy, with episodes from Gordon's own life, and anecdotes from other filmmakers, and about the state of our mysterious complex world and the future of mankind, illustrated with abstract and associative collages by the Danish artist Sergei Svyatchenko.

Gordon died in December 2020, of an undisclosed cause.

== Filmography ==
=== Director ===
==== Features ====
- The Last Night in Paradise (1964)
- Sergey Lazo (aka Conspiracy in Vladivostok or A Hero of the Far East) (1967)
- Theft ('Krazha') (1970)
- Skirmish in a Blizzard ('Skhvatka v purge') (1977)
- Scenes from Family Life (aka Stay With Me!) (1979)
- The Man Who Closed the City (aka The Source of the Fire) (1982)
- Double Passing ('Dvoynoy obgon') (1984)
- Ransom ('Vykup') (1986)
- Football Player ('Futbolist') (1990)
- Meeting with the Doukhobors of Canada (1991 documentary)

==== Shorts ====
- The Killers ('Ubiytsy') (aka Hemmingway's The Killers) (1956, co-directed with Tarkovskiy and Marika Beiku)
- There Will Be No Leave Today (1959 TV propaganda, co-directed with Tarkovskiy)
- Stone Kilometers (1962)
- Demagogue (1969, segment of Ep.80 of TV series Fuse ('Fitil'))
- Behind the Wheel, Korobkin (1973 educational film)
- Simple arithmetic (1981, Fuse Ep.226, segment)
- The wrong ones were attacked (1989, Fuse Ep.321, segment)
- Come again? (1989, Fuse Ep.327, segment)
- Masquerade (1990, Fuse Ep.334, segment)
- The fate of the resident (1992, Fuse Ep.358, segment)

=== Russian Dubbing ===
- Nostalghia (1983 Tarkovskiy film)
- The Sacrifice (1986 Tarkovskiy film)

=== Screenwriter ===
- The Killers (co-written with Tarkovskiy)
- There Will Be No Leave Today (co-written with Tarkovskiy and Irina Makhovaya)
- Andrei Tarkovsky's Taiga Summer (1994 documentary and dramatization, co-written with Marina Tarkovskaya)

=== Actor ===
- The Killers (as George the bartender)
- There Will Be No Leave Today (as a sapper who took a rifle from Captain Galich)

== Books ==
- Unquenched Thirst. Memories of Andrei Tarkovskiy (2006)
- Hungarian Flying Shot (2011)
- Tucherez, or the Incredible is Likely (2016)
