= Viktor Korshunov =

- Виктор Коршунов
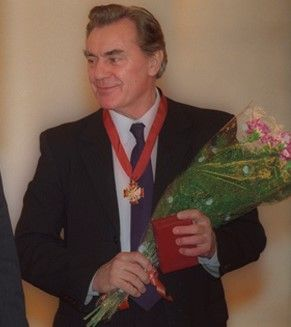
- Korshunov in 2000
- Born: 24 November 1929; Moscow, Russian SFSR, Soviet Union
- Died: 17 April 2015 (aged 85); Moscow, Russia
- Occupations: Actor; Theater director; Pedagogue
- Years active: 1951–2015

Viktor Ivanovich Korshunov (Note: Russian: Виктор Иванович Коршунов, romanized: Viktor Ivanovich Korshunov) (24 November 1929 – 17 April 2015) was a Soviet and Russian stage and film actor, theater director and pedagogue. People's Artist of the USSR (1984).

== Biography ==
He was born in Moscow on Sukharevskaya Street.

Member of the Communist Party of the Soviet Union since 1959.

He died in Moscow and was buried in the Novodevichy Cemetery.

== Selected filmography ==
- Early Joys (1956) – Kirill Izvekov
- An Unusual Summer (1957) – Kirill Izvekov
- The Magpie (1958) – Stepan
- On Thin Ice (1966) – Dmitry Dmitriyevich Bragin
- Retribution (1967) – Chief of the military hospital
- Goal! Another Goal! (1968) – Andrei Pavlovich Tamantsev, coach
- Bonivur's Heart (1969) – Boris Lyubansky
- Corps of General Shubnikov (1980) – Army general

== Awards and honors ==
- Honored Artist of the RSFSR (1961)
- People's Artist of the RSFSR (1969)
- Jubilee Medal "In Commemoration of the 100th Anniversary of the Birth of Vladimir Ilyich Lenin" (1970)
- Order of the October Revolution (1974)
- Order of the Red Banner of Labour (1980)
- Medal "Veteran of Labour" (1984)
- People's Artist of the USSR (1984)
- Order "For Merit to the Fatherland", 4th class (1994)
- Order "For Merit to the Fatherland", 3rd class (1999)
- Order "For Merit to the Fatherland", 2nd class (2005)
