= Roza Makagonova =

Soviet actress (1927–1995)

- Born: 28 October 1927; Samara, Soviet Union
- Died: 18 April 1995 (aged 67); Moscow, Russia
- Occupation: Actress
- Years active: 1947–1993
- Spouse: Vladimir Basov

Roza Ivanovna Makagonova (Russian: Роза Ивановна Макагонова, 28 October 1927 – 18 April 1995) was a Soviet actress. She was awarded as a Meritorious Artist in 1976.

== Biography ==
Makagonova was born in 1927 in Samara. In 1951, she finished the Gerasimov Institute of Cinematography and until 1990, she worked in the governmental theater of actors in Moscow. She was married to Vladimir Basov. She died in Moscow on 18 April 1995, aged 67.

== Selected filmography ==
- The Village Teacher (1947) as Masha
- Far from Moscow (1951) as Zhenya
- Marina's Destiny (1953) as Nastuska
- Certificate of Maturity (1954) as Cinderella
- No Ordinary Summer (1956) as Anna Parabukina
- The Adventures of Elektronik (1979) as singing lessons teacher
- The Shroud of Alexander Nevsky (1992) as Vorobyov's neighbor

== Dubbing roles ==
- The Little Mermaid (1968)
- Flying Phantom Ship (1969) as Mrs Kuroshio
- Hans Christian Andersen's The Little Mermaid (1975) as Marina (in Russian language dubbing)
