= Vladimir Grammatikov =

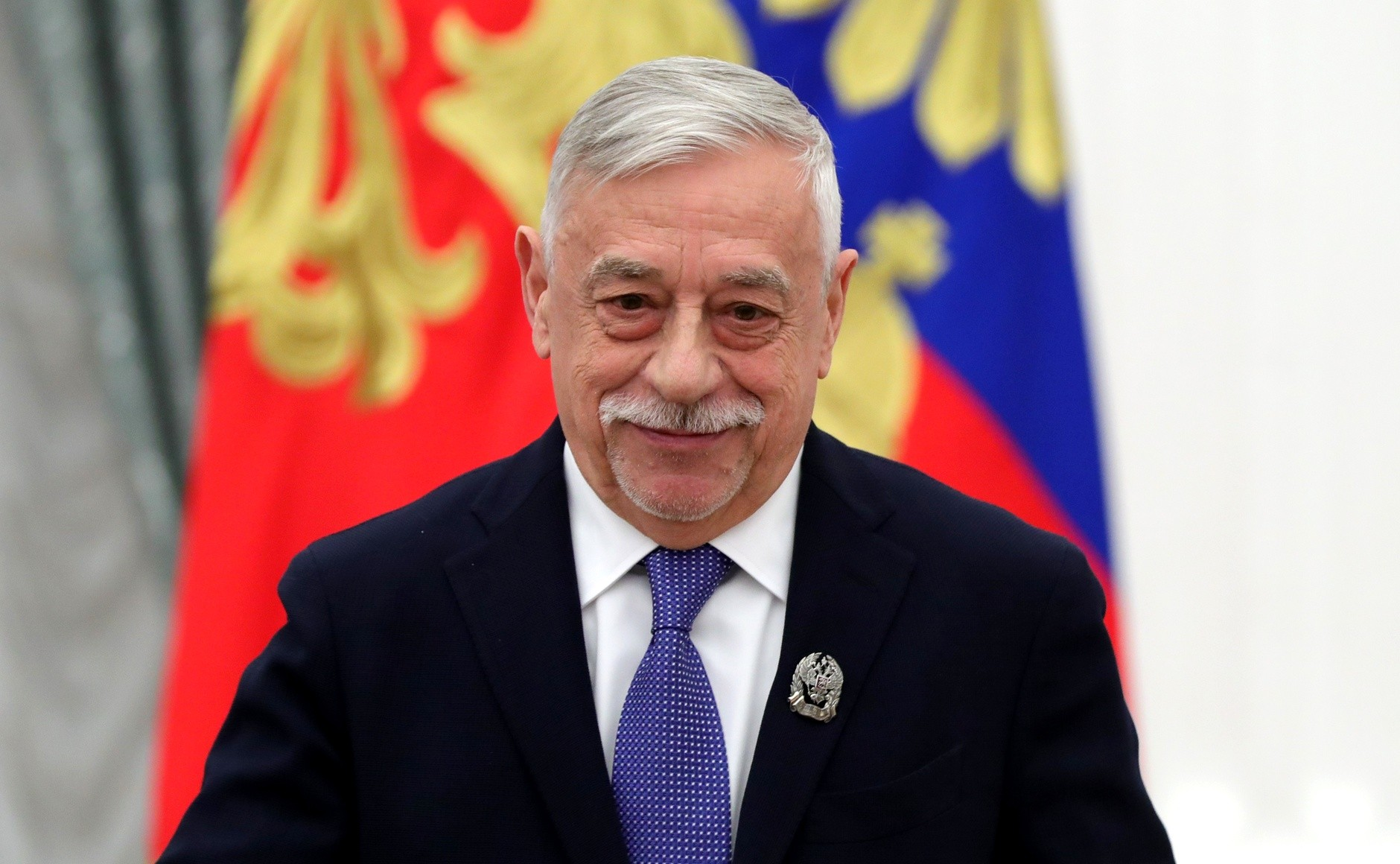
- Born: Vladimir Alexandrovich Grammatikov; 1 June 1942 (age 84); Sverdlovsk, Soviet Union
- Occupations: Filmmaker, actor
- Years active: 1963–present
- Spouse(s): Natalia Zhukova, 2 children

Vladimir Alexandrovich Grammatikov (Russian: Владимир Алeксандpoвич Грамматикoв; born 1 June 1942) is a Russian and Soviet theater and film actor, director, screenwriter and producer. He was awarded as Honored Artist of the Russian Federation in 1995.

== Biography ==
Vladimir Grammatikov was born on 1 June 1942 in Sverdlovsk. He graduated from the construction faculty of radio Bauman College in Moscow, and then decided to work in cinematography. Later, he got an education at the acting department Russian Academy of Theatre Arts, becoming an actor pantomime.

In 1976 he graduated from the Directing Department of Gerasimov Institute of Cinematography (class of Efim Dzigan).

From 1976 he became actor and director of Gorky Film Studio. He directed sketches for the newsreel Yeralash and commercials.

Since 1990, Vladimir became artistic director of the creative association Contact (from Gorky Film Studio). He is one of the founders and artistic director of the studio Starlight. He was the President of the Starlight-fest, an international children's film festival in Artek (1992–1996). He is one of the founders of the Festival of Visual Arts at the Russian Children's Center Eaglet (1997–2006).

He was the chief director and artistic director of the children's series for preschoolers, Sesame Street in Russia (NTV).

In March 2010, Vladimir Grammatikov was appointed as creative producer for Disney in Russia.

His first full-length work as a director was a children's comedy film Mustached Nanny from 1977. The film was a box-office hit, which attracted about 53 million viewers at the time. Grammatikov found himself a niche in children's and teen films, and virtually all subsequent work of the director in the genre of family films and won prizes at Soviet and international film festivals. One of his most famous films afterwards was the international film project Mio in the Land of Faraway (1987).

== Selected filmography ==
=== Actor ===
- Belorussian Station (1971) as Grisha
- Ilf and Petrov Rode a Tram (1972) as Ussishkin
- Train Stop – Two Minutes (1972) as malinger
- The Sixth (1981) as Pavlik
- Crazy Day of Engineer Barkasov (1983) as radio center director
- The Russian Singer (1993) as Nikolai Kleiman
- A Little Princess (1997) as antiquarian

=== Director ===
- Mustached Nanny (1977)
- A Dog walked along the Piano (1978)
- Everything's the Wrong Way (1981)
- The Star and Death of Joaquin Murieta (1982)
- Mio in the Land of Faraway (1987)
- The Sisters Liberty (1990)
- A Little Princess (1997)

=== Producer ===
- Come Look at Me (2001)
