= Swarm (disambiguation) =

A swarm is a group of animals that aggregate and travel in the same direction.

Swarm or The Swarm may also refer to:

== Arts and entertainment ==
=== Fictional characters ===
- Swarm (Marvel Comics), a Marvel Comics supervillain
- Swarm (Transformers), a Transformers character
- Swarm, the name of an Air-element character in Skylanders: Giants

=== Film and television ===
- The Swarm (1978 film), a disaster film about a killer bee invasion
- The Swarm (1990 film), a Soviet drama film
- Destination: Infestation, a 2007 TV film released on DVD as Swarm or Deadly Swarm
- The Swarm (2020 film), a French horror film about locusts
- Swarm (film), a 2026 Spanish rural thriller film
- Swarm (TV series), a 2023 Amazon Prime Video horror-thriller series
- The Swarm (TV series), a 2023 European Alliance co-produced TV series
- "The Swarm" (Star Trek: Voyager), an episode of Star Trek: Voyager

=== Literature ===
- The Swarm (Schätzing novel), a 2004 science fiction novel by Frank Schätzing
- The Swarm (Card and Johnston novel), a 2016 science fiction novel by Orson Scott Card and Aaron Johnston
- The Swarm, a 1974 novel by Arthur Herzog
- "Swarm" (novelette), a 1982 science fiction novelette written by Bruce Sterling
- Galaxy of Fear: The Swarm, a book in the Galaxy of Fear series by John Whitman set in the Star Wars galaxy

=== Music ===
- All About Eve (band), a British rock band formerly known as The Swarm
- The Swarm, Dominic Glynn's band name for a music project
- The Swarm (album), 1998 album by various artists affiliated with or part of the Wu-Tang Clan
- Swarm!, a 2006 album by Torture Killer
- "The Swarm" (song), a 2012 song by British rock band You Me at Six
- "The Swarm", a 2025 song from the album The Ossuary Lens by Allegaeon
- "The Swarm", a 1994 song from the album Terminal Spirit Diseaseby At the Gates
- "Swarm", a 2001 song from the album Signs by Badmarsh & Shri
- "The Swarm", a 2019 song from the album Rapture by Betraying the Martyrs
- "The Swarm", a 2014 song from the album Shadows of the Dying Sun by Insomnium
- "The Swarm", a 2014 song from the album Watchers of Rule by Unearth

=== Video games ===
- Swarm (1998 video game), for IBM PC compatibles
- Swarm (2011 video game), for Xbox 360 and PlayStation 3
- The Swarm, working title of the 2008 video game MorphX
- Zerg, also known as The Swarm, a race in the Starcraft video game series

=== Other arts and entertainment ===
- The Swarm (roller coaster), Thorpe Park, United Kingdom

== Sports ==
- Georgia Swarm, a box lacrosse team in the National Lacrosse League
- Minnesota Swarm, a former box lacrosse team in the National Lacrosse League
- Botany Swarm, a semi-professional ice hockey team based in East Auckland, New Zealand
- Swarm (spirit organization), an organization of supporters of Georgia Tech Yellow Jackets sports teams

== Technology ==
- Swarm (app), a mobile app by Foursquare
- Roccat Swarm, software by Roccat
- Swarm (ESA mission), a European Space Agency satellite mission to measure Earth's magnetic field
- Swarm (simulation), a multi-agent simulation package
- SWARM, a remote weapon system
- Swarm, a Docker software tool
- Swarm, a decentralized file storage implementation for Ethereum

== Other uses ==
- Swarm Development Group, an American non-profit organization
- Swarm Technologies, a satellite manufacturer
- Swarm Peak, a rock peak in the Ford Ranges, Marie Byrd Land, Antarctica
- The Swarm, the name of VTuber Neuro-sama's fanbase

== See also ==
- Swarm behaviour, examples and mathematical models
- Swarm intelligence, an artificial intelligence technique
- Swarm robotics, approach to the coordination of multirobot systems
- Earthquake swarm, a series of earthquakes in one area
- Swarming (honey bee), the natural means of reproduction of honey bee colonies
- Swarming (military), an approach of using "pulses" of converging combat agents onto a target
- Swarming motility, a type of bacterial motility
