= Sergey Koltakov =

Soviet and Russian actor (1955–2020)

- Born: Sergey Mikhailovich Koltakov; 10 December 1955; Barnaul, Altai Krai, RSFSR, USSR
- Died: 7 September 2020 (aged 64); Moscow, Russia
- Resting place: Troyekurovskoye Cemetery
- Education: GITIS
- Occupation: Actor
- Years active: 1981–2020
- Awards: Prize of the Federal Security Service of Russia (2008)

Sergey Mikhailovich Koltakov (Russian: Серге́й Миха́йлович Колтако́в; 10 December 1955 – 7 September 2020) was a Soviet and Russian actor.

== Biography ==
Sergey Koltakov was born in Barnaul, Altai Krai, Russian SFSR, Soviet Union. He studied at the Saratov Drama School in the acting department (1975-1976). In 1979 he graduated from the acting department Russian Academy of Theatre Arts.

He made his debut in cinema in 1981 in Gleb Panfilov's Valentina in the role of Pavel. Notoriety in cinema came three years later, after shooting Inna Tumanyan's Partners, when playing the role of a criminal Anatoly.

The actor starred in many years of perestroika, playing a completely different role. Among his works, his role in films Mirror for a Hero (directed by Vladimir Khotinenko), The Art of Living in Odessa (Georgi Yungvald-Khilkevich), Armavir (Vadim Abdrashitov).

Since the beginning of the 1990s Koltakov starred in the movies less often. For his performance as Svidrigailov in the play Dreams of Rodion Romanovich in 2006 (814 Theatre Association of Oleg Menshikov) was nominated for the Seagull Theater Award.

In 2008 he was awarded the Prize of the Federal Security Service.

== Filmography ==
- 1981 — Valentina as Pavel
- 1983 — Partners as Anatoly Tredubenko
- 1986 — In Shooting Solitude as Fedor Krohov
- 1986 — Triple jump Panther as Babichev, a former prisoner
- 1987 — Two of the island of tears as Seva
- 1987 — Mirror for a Hero as Sergey Kirillovich Pshenichny
- 1988 — New Adventures of a Yankee in King Arthur's Court as Hank Morgan
- 1988 — The Life of Klim Samgin as Makarov
- 1989 — Soothe My Sorrows as Boris
- 1989 — The Art of Living in Odessa as Benya Krik
- 1991 — Armavir as Semin
- 1995 — Running People as engineer Suslov
- 1998 — Greetings from Charlie-blower as Felix
- 1998 — Mama Don't Cry as Belsky
- 1999 — Strastnoy Boulevard as Andrei Sokolov
- 2004 — Children of the Arbat as Solts
- 2005 — Thrown as Major Genin
- 2005 — Destructive Power 6 as Krutikov
- 2005 — Mama Don't Cry 2 as Belsky
- 2008 — Terra Nova as Makhov
- 2008 — Save Our Souls as Burtasov, NKVD colonel
- 2008 — The Brothers Karamazov as Fyodor Pavlovich Karamazov
- 2009 — Kakraki as Andrei Vasilyev
- 2009 — Pelagia and the White Bulldog as Kirill Krasnov, the landowner
- 2009 — Attack on Leningrad as Andrei Zhdanov
- 2011 — The PyraMMMid as Prime Minister
- 2011 — Summer Wolves as Denis Pankratovich Semerenkov
- 2012 — Novel with Cocaine as lawyer Mintz
- 2012 — Conductor as Evgeny Nadezhdin, tenor
- 2012 — The Dark Side of the Moon as Vsevolod Ukolov, actor
- 2012 — The Exception to the Rule as Vasily Lomov
- 2013 — Dr. Death as Anton Mets
- 2014 — Leaving Nature as Andrey Yurevich Zvonarev, filmmaker
- 2017 — The Road to Calvary as Dmitry Bulavin
- 2019 — Union of Salvation as Nikolay Mordvinov, senator
- 2020 — The Silver Skates as Dmitri Mendeleev
