= Glinjeni =

Glinjeni may refer to several places in Moldova:

- Glinjeni, Făleşti, a commune in Făleşti district
- Glinjeni, Şoldăneşti, a commune in Şoldăneşti district
