= In the Zone of Special Attention =

1977 Soviet film by Andrey Igorevitsj Maljukov

- Directed by: Andrei Malyukov
- Written by: Evgeny Mesyatsev; Grigori Chukhrai
- Starring: Boris Galkin; Mihai Volontir; Anatoly Kuznetsov; Aleksandr Pyatkov
- Cinematography: Igor Bohdanov
- Music by: Mark Minkov
- Production company: Mosfilm
- Release date: 1978
- Running time: 93 minutes
- Country: Soviet Union
- Language: Russian

In the Zone of Special Attention (Russian: В зоне особого внимания, romanized: V zone osobogo vnimaniya) is a 1978 Soviet action film directed by Andrei Malyukov and produced by Mosfilm. The film received political support from the commander of the Soviet Airborne Forces General Vasily Margelov. It stars Boris Galkin as Guards Lieutenant Viktor Tarasov, a young inexperienced graduate of the Ryazan Higher Airborne Command School, alongside Mihai Volontir as the experienced Guards Praporshchik Aleksandr Volontir, taking part in a military exercise conducted by the Soviet Armed Forces.

In the Zone of Special Attention was released in the Soviet Union in 1978. On release, the film saw a domestic audience of approximately 35.4 million viewers. It achieved cult film status among generations of the Soviet and later Russian Airborne Forces (VDV), serving as a popular reference in the culture of the combat arm.

A sequel, Hit Back, in which Galkin and Volontir reprised their roles was directed by Mikhail Tumanishvili and released in 1981.

== Plot ==
Somewhere in the Soviet Union, preparations are underway for a large-scale military exercise pitting two operational groups, Northern and Southern, against each other. Southern is tasked with performing reconnaissance mission ahead of a planned airborne assault, while Northern must defend their control points against the infiltrators. Southern's objective is to locate and neutralise Northern's concealed command post commander by Major Moroshkin. Two units led by Lieutenant Kirikov and Lieutenant Pakhomov are to carry out diversionary attacks to draw the enemy away, while a third, led by Lieutenant Tarasov - a recent graduate of the Ryazan Higher Airborne Command School, is to locate the enemies hidden command post and activate a beacon to guide the main paratrooper force. Given Tarasov's inexperience, the seasoned Praporshchik Volontir is assigned to accompany him.

Meanwhile, a group of criminals had escaped from a nearby prison worksite, capturing an AKM from their guard, and are presumed to be in the vicinity of the exercise area. The diversionary groups perform their tasks but are soon captured, while Tarasov, Volontir, Egorov and Pugachev make their way towards their objective, with Tarasov's textbook approach at odds with Volontir's learned experience. Tarasov sends Volontir and Egorov to scout out a fuel depot where they narrowly evade capture, before uniting again and successfully carrying out a diversionary raid at a missile base. The group rests for the night at a local forester's house.

The next morning, the criminals have ransacked a local store. Tarasov's squad continues towards their objective, but finds a destroyed car. The driver was killed and a woman was severely injured. Tarasov uses his military radio and homing beacon to report the incident to the Militsiya, knowing that this will give away the whereabouts of his squad to the opposing force. Volontir stays behind to look after the woman, while the rest of the squad continues onwards. Major Moroshkin leads a search party to find the group, having intercepted Tarasov's signal. The paratroopers narrowly manage to escape by trudging through a thick swamp. As the police arrive, Volontir hurries towards the foresters house, intending to borrow a motorcycle in order to catch up with the rest of the group. As he arrives at the cabin, he realises that its inhabitants are held hostage by the criminals on the run. Volontir is able to neutralise the criminals using his proficiency in unarmed martial arts. The airborne troops launch their aircraft for the operation, awaiting Tarasov's signal.

Praporshchik Volontir and Lieutenant Tarasov

Tarasov's group continues towards an old fortress where the command post is presumed to be, hiding on the roof of a train and borrowing a BTR to evade capture. Volontir separately makes his way towards the same objective on a motorcycle. The group breaks into the fortress by driving through the gate while Volontir subdues the checkpoint sentry. The group enters the fortress, only to discover that the command post is a decoy. Dismayed, Tarasov declares that the mission was a failure. Volontir cheers up the young officer, suggesting that the group investigate the gate checkpoint further, as he noticed that it was connected to a telephone line. With little time remaining, Volontir remains behind to distract the pursuers.

With only a few minutes remaining, Tarasov and his men follow the telephone line and discover the real command post, disguised as a barn. The group apprehends the posts signal crew as well as Major Moroshkin, offering his a lighter. The beacon is activated and the airdrop of the main paratrooper force takes place. Led By Tarasov, the force storms the bunker and takes control of the operational control room, declaring in triumph: "The concealed command post is destroyed. My apologies, comrade general."

== Cast ==
- Boris Galkin — guard lieutenant of the "Southern", Viktor Pavlovich Tarasov
- Mihai Volontir — guard praporshchik of the "Southern", Alexander Volontir (voice Nikolai Gubenko)
- Sergey Volkash — guard private "Southern", Alexei Egorov, fighter of Tarasov's group
- Igor Ivanov — guard sergeant of the "Southern", Pugachev, radio operator of Tarasov's group
- Anatoly Kuznetsov — Major Gennady Semyonovich Moroshkin, Head of counterintelligence of the "Northern"
- Alexander Pyatkov — captain of the "Northern", Zuev ("Zuich")
- Vladimir Zamansky — guards colonel, commander of the regiment "Southern"
- Oleg Golubitsky — guard lieutenant colonel "Southern", Oleg Borisovich, Chief of Staff of the Regiment
- Boris Bachurin — guard lieutenant "Southern", Pakhomov
- Mikhail Chigaryov — guard senior lieutenant of the "Southern", Kirikov
- Anatoly Vedenkin — guard praporschik of the "Northern" in the captured by the paratroopers UAZ-469
- Ivan Agafonov — lieutenant colonel of the militia
- Elena Kuzmina — shopwoman of the robbed shop
- Nikolai Kryukov — old forester, grandfather of Pugachev
- Elena Tsyplakova — granddaughter of the forester, Nastya
- Mikhail Kokshenov — guard major "Southern", Smolin, duty officer
- Sergei Podgorny — soldier-driver in the store
- Yuri Chernov — duty officer of the "Northern"
- Gennady Chulkov — lieutenant-colonel, head of "Northern" intelligence
- Alexander Gai — major-general Protasov, commander of the regiment of the "Northern"
- Irena Leonavičiūtė-Bratkauskiene — attendant
- Victor Denisov — criminal
- Victor Smekalin — criminal

== Production ==
=== Writing ===
According to the lead actor Boris Galkin, the plot is based on a real case when a squad of soldiers apprehended a group of criminals who had fled from a penal colony. The script for the film was reportedly adapted from the reporting into the incident.

=== Casting ===
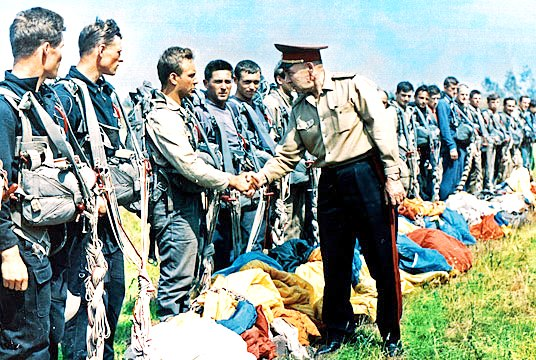
Genearl Vasily Margelov with paratroopers.

The decision to have the scouts wearing their distinctive blue berets in the film was made at the request of the Commander of the Soviet Airborne Forces Vasily Margelov, as a deliberate symbolic and promotional choice for the branch. In reality, airborne forces would not wear highly visible berets during operations. Tarasov's men do not wear standard KLMK coveralls or KZS suits, as the director Andrei Malyukov wanted the characters to look sharp, athletic and heroic. Custom "birch" tunics were created by the costume department of Mosfilm, which maintained a more sharply cut two-piece tactical suit with breast, shoulder and trouser pockets, in contrast with the loose and baggy appearance of the former. The custom uniforms would strongly resemble the later Afghanka or Border Guard uniforms in Soviet service, although neither were fielded at the time of the film's production.

The notable stuntman and martial artist Tadeush Kasyanov makes a cameo appearance in the film.

=== Filming ===
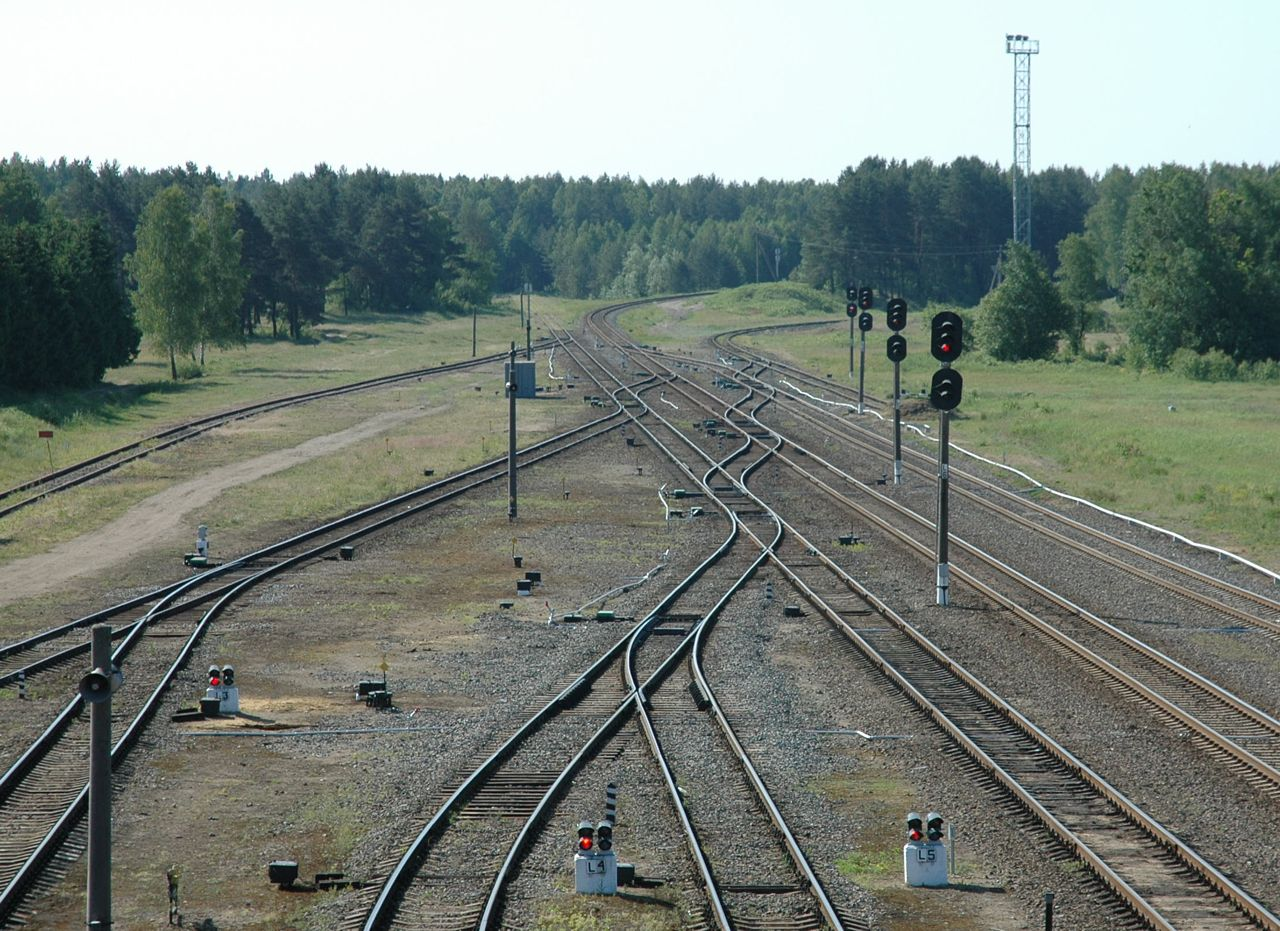
Gaižiūnai

Principal photography primarily took place in the Lithuanian SSR, in the vicinity of the 242nd Training Centre of the Airborne Forces in Gaižiūnai. The bridge scene took place on a section of the A1 highway near Babtai crossing the Nevėžis River, while Kaunas Fortress No. 4 was used for the command post scenes. The changing of the guard, as well as interrogation scenes conducted by Major Moroshkin took place at Lefortovo Barracks in Moscow.

All scenes involving aircraft were filmed at Vitebsk-North Air Base, with the participation of the 339th Military Transport Aviation Regiment. The identifying details of the Ilyushin Il-76 aircraft used were blurred out in post-production.

A notable number of scenes were cut for reasons of military operational security. The film strips composing these scenes was subsequently destroyed.

== Release ==
At first, the film risked not being released to theatres on the direction of the Main Political Administration of the Soviet Armed Forces, arguing that the release of a film that "glorifies the power of the Soviet Armed Forces" during a time of international détente, risked straining international relations. These concerns were eased through the close association and influence of Vasily Margelov. In an interview in February 2007, director Andrei Malyukov stated that he was still unsure in which countries the movie was released.

In line with other classic films produced by Mosfilm, In the Zone of Special Attention is freely available to view on the Mosfilm Youtube and Rutube channels.

On 14 September 2026, the Ukrainian Ministry of Culture added lead actor Boris Galkin to its "List of persons who pose a threat to national security", citing the actors continued public support for Russia. Under Ukrainian legislation, the distribution of any works featuring a listed person is severely restricted across television, online streaming and public viewing.

== Legacy ==
Following the release of the film, it was reported that competition for the Ryazan Higher Airborne Command School increased significantly, to twenty applicants per place, largely related to the charismatic character of Lieutenant Tarasov. Following the release of In the Zone of Special Attention and Hit Back, Galkin met General Yevgeny Podkolzin, commander of the Soviet Airborne Forces, who thanked him for greatly increasing esprit de corps.

The film remains a calling card in the culture of the Soviet and now Russian Airborne Forces, with screenings often taking place on Paratroopers' Day.

== Representation in other media ==
- The scene of Tarasov escaping through a swamp is replicated in the 2004 Russian television show Diversant, (Note: English: Saboteur) with the protagonist played by Vladislav Galkin, the son of Boris Galkin. Instead of the military loudspeaker playing the Alla Pugacheva song Ochen khorosho, (Note: Russian: Очень хорошо, English: Very Good) the popular German wartime song Lili Marleen by Lale Andersen is played.
- The 2009 video game S.T.A.L.K.E.R.: Call of Pripyat by the Ukrainian game studio GSC Game World contains the non-player characters Captain Tarasov and Warrant Officer Valentir, who are members of the military faction.
