= Mihai Volontir =

Moldovan actor and politician (1934–2015)

Mihai Volontir OR PAU
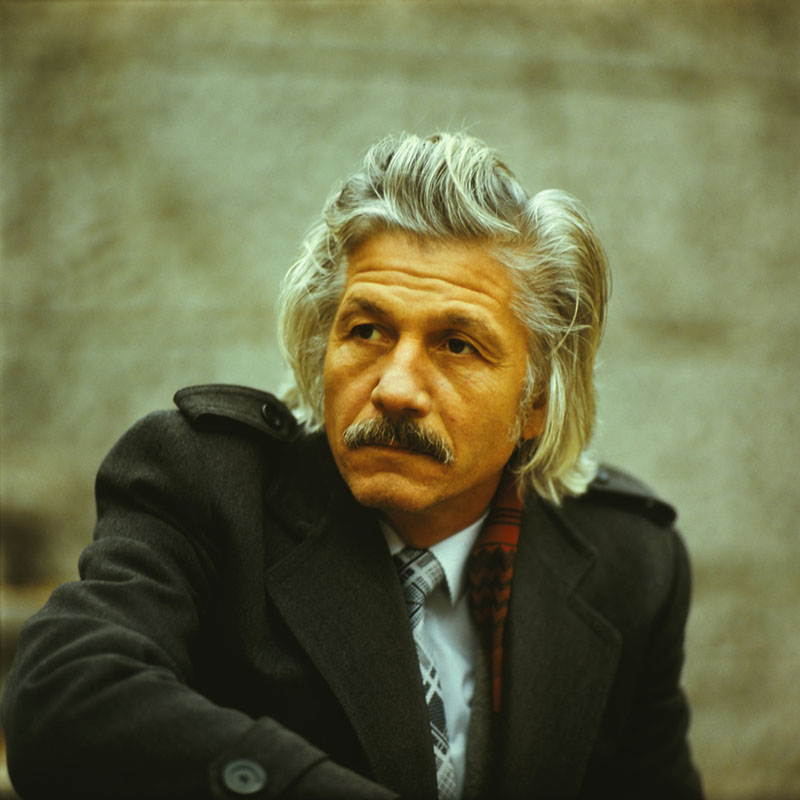
- Volontir in 1985
- Born: 9 March 1934; Glinjeni, Kingdom of Romania
- Died: 15 September 2015 (aged 81); Chișinău, Moldova
- Occupation: Actor
- Years active: 1957-2015

Mihai Volontir (9 March 1934 – 15 September 2015) was a Soviet and Moldovan actor. People's Artist of the USSR (1984).

== Biography ==
Volontir was born on 9 March 1934 in the village of Glinjeni, Moldova. He attended the Pedagogical Institution in Orhei from 1952 to 1955.

After over a decade of working in theatre, Volontir began appearing in films made at the Moldova-Film studio in 1967. He became famous in the late 1970s after his roles in In the Zone of Special Attention and The Gypsy film series. The films were so popular that he is still strongly associated with his character, Budulai, a wise lone gypsy. His performance resulted in increased tolerance towards gypsy communities in the Soviet Union. The film series was revived fifteen years later with a new production as well as a TV series.

Volontir worked at the Vasile Alecsandri Theatre in Bălţi, where he was employed as an actor from 1957 until his death in 2015.

He was also a supporter of the Romanian identity.

17 September 2015, the day of his funeral, was declared a day of National Mourning in Moldova.

== Filmography ==
| Year | Title | Role | Notes |
|---|---|---|---|
| 1968 | Se cauta un paznic | Ivan Turbinca | |
| 1968 | Eto mgnovenie | Mihai Adam | |
| 1972 | That Sweet Word: Liberty! | Carlos Caro | |
| 1973 | Dmitriy Kantemir | Dmitri Kantemir | |
| 1973 | Chetvyortyy | | |
| 1974 | Muzhchiny sedeyut rano | Andrey Rezlog | |
| 1975 | Tütak säsi | Cabrayil | |
| 1977 | Koren zhizni | Lukyan Batyr | |
| 1978 | In the Zone of Special Attention | Praporshchik Volentir | |
| 1978 | Agent sekretnoy sluzhby | | |
| 1979 | Centaurs | Evaristo | |
| 1979 | Bezotvetnaya lyubov | Passerby | |
| 1981 | Ot Buga do Visly | Vershigora, commander of guerrilla connection | |
| 1981 | Hit Back | Praporshchik Volentir | |
| 1982 | Olenya okhota | Golovin | |
| 1982 | Incident at Map Grid 36-80 | Skiba | |
| 1982 | Eta muzhskaya druzhba | Anton Greku | |
| 1983 | Bud schastliva, Yuliya | Radu | |
| 1984 | Obvineniye | | |
| 1985 | Ya za tebya otvechayu | | |
| 1986 | Vilkolakio pedsakai | | |
| 1989 | Vernymi ostanemsya | | |
| 1990 | Stuk v dver | | |
| 1992 | Vinovata li ya... | | (final film role) |

== Awards ==
- Order of the Republic (Moldova)
- Vasilyev Brothers State Prize of the RSFSR (1980)
- People's Artist of the USSR (1984)

== See also ==
- Cinema of Moldova
