= KLMK =

KLMK may refer to:

- Kamuflirovannyi Letnyi Maskirovochnyi Kombinezon (Camouflage Summer Deceptive Coverall)
- KLMK (FM), a radio station (90.7 FM) licensed to Marvell, Arkansas, United States
