= Gennady Pishchayev =

Russian singer

- Born: Gennady Mikhailovich Pishchayev; 30 July 1927 (age 98); Zirgan, RSFSR, USSR
- Occupation: singer
- Years active: since 1953

Gennady Mikhailovich Pishchayev (Russian: Генна́дий Миха́йлович Пища́ев; born July 30, 1927) is a Soviet opera singer, lyric tenor altino. Honored Artist of the RSFSR (1965).

== Biography ==
Gennady was born in the village of Zirgan, Meleuzovsky District, Bashkir Autonomous Soviet Socialist Republic. His brother Pavel is an honorary citizen of the Salavat, director of the sulfuric acid and catalyst plant of the Salavat petrochemical plant.

The parents of Gennady, Mikhail Stepanovich and Klavdiya Petrovna (nee Makarova), were ordinary people. The grandfather of Gennady Pishchaev was a blacksmith. The family was very fond of singing, his father played the accordion well, his father's brother was considered a good singer.

He was born without an arm, which did not prevent him from developing many talents.

Currently lives in Moscow.

== Career ==
He worked at the Bashkir Opera and Ballet Theater (Ufa), where he performed the part of Lensky in the opera Eugene Onegin (1966).

He worked at the Leningrad Maly Opera and Ballet Theatre, where he also performed the part of Lensky (1968).

Since 1980 he taught at the vocal faculty of GITIS.

In 1988 at the Bolshoi Theatre, he sang the part of the Astrologer in Rimsky-Korsakov's The Golden Cockerel. In the film Mirror for a Hero, Gennady Pishchayev sang Smith's serenade from Bizet's opera La jolie fille de Perth.

== Awards ==
June 17, 1999 – Order of Friendship

== Discography ==
=== Albums ===
- Gennady Pishchayev (Mono, 1960)
- Gennady Pishchayev (RP, 1968)
- Songs And Dances of The Renaissance (LP, 1977) with Sándor Kallós
- Romances (LP)
- Tchaikovsky. Sixteen Songs for Children (LP, 1980)

=== Singles ===
- Sweetheart, Wonderful / High Wave On the Volga (Mono, 1954)
- Rendezvous (Mono, 1965)
