= Alone and Unarmed =

- Poster with German title
- Directed by: Pavel Fattahutdinov; Vladimir Khotinenko
- Written by: Nikolai Leonov
- Produced by: Galina Sedova
- Starring: Vasily Mishchenko; Ivan Agafonov; Vsevolod Larionov
- Cinematography: Boris Shapiro
- Edited by: Marya Rodionova; Louise Sadovskaya
- Music by: Vadim Bibergan
- Production company: Sverdlovsk Film Studio
- Release date: 1984
- Running time: 73 min
- Language: Russian

Alone and Unarmed (Russian: Один и без оружия, romanized: Odin i bez oruzhiya) is a 1984 Soviet action adventure film directed by Pavel Fattahutdinov and Vladimir Khotinenko. A screen adaptation of the detective Nikolai Leonov's Agony.

== Plot ==
The film is set in 1927. Former commander of the Red Army Konstantin Vorontsov is appointed chief of criminal investigation in a small provincial town. Together with experienced investigation employee Ivan Melentyev, he starts to fight the leader of the thieves' world who goes by the name of Korney. Vorontsov and Melentyev prefer different methods of work; if Melentyev relies on deliberate placement of his people in the criminal environment, then Vorontsov wants to act as quickly as possible. The complexity of the struggle against Korney is that he does not commit the crimes with his own hands but instead oversees their execution. Due to a successful operation judiciary police manages to plant their agent to Korney in order to find out the place and time of the upcoming thief gathering. But at the last moment he changes the gathering place. Vorontsov has no time to warn anyone and is forced to act alone. He cleverly plays on the diverging interests in the company of thieves and destroys their sense of community. Korney kills Vorontsov but then gets arrested.

== Cast ==
- Vasily Mishchenko as Konstantin Nikolaevich Vorontsov
- Ivan Agafonov as Korney
- Vsevolod Larionov as Ivan Ivanovich Melentyev
- Viktor Bortsov as Dmitry Sergeyevich
- Boris Galkin as Sonny
- Adolf Ilyin as Alexey
- Mikhail Kononov as Pyotr, porter
- Avangard Leontiev as photographer
- Elena Mayorova as Darya Ivanovna Latysheva
- Talgat Nigmatulin as Khan (Hassan Halidov)
- Nikolay Smorchkov as Treshchalov

== Production ==
Vladimir Khotinenko's film was shot in Perm and Kungur.
