= Wolfhound (1992 film) =

Volkodav
- Directed by: Mikhail Tumanishvili
- Written by: Yuri Korotkov; Vitali Moskalenko; Yusup Razykov
- Starring: Inara Slucka; Aleksei Guskov; Anatoli Romashin
- Cinematography: Dmitri Madorsky; Valentin Piganov
- Edited by: Tatyana Lapshina
- Music by: Viktor Babushkin
- Distributed by: Cinebridge; Mosfilm; Slovo
- Release date: 1992
- Running time: 103 minutes
- Country: Soviet Union
- Language: Russian

Wolfhound (Russian: Волкодав, romanized: Volkodav) is a 1992 Soviet action film by Mikhail Tumanishvili.

== Plot ==
Two orphanage children find themselves on opposite sides of the barricades. Volkov became a criminal, and Zhuravleva became a police officer. As a criminal investigation officer, she is tasked with infiltrating a gang of dangerous criminals, but there she accidentally runs into her former lover Volkov. Both are faced with a choice.

== Cast ==
- Inara Slucka as Viktoria Zhuravleva
- Aleksei Guskov as Volkov
- Anatoli Romashin as Stepanishchev
- Valery Barinov as Korneev
- Aleksandr Fatyushin as Vova
- Aleksandr Ilyin as Major Stupor
- Vladimir Ilyin as Polozkov
- Vladimir Serdyukov as Gena
- Vladimir Troshin as Burov
- Vladimir Basov, Jr. as Sergey Yevgenievich
- Maria Vinogradova as landlady
- Oksana Arbuzova as Prostitute
- Vitali Moskalenko as Valerik
- Fyodor Smirnov as Mishchenko
- Vasily Strelnikov as Policeman
