= The Detached Mission =

- Spanish poster, citing the NYT: "El "Rambo" Sovietico Arrasa… America Tiembla…"
- Directed by: Mikhail Tumanishvili
- Written by: Yevgeni Mesyatsev
- Starring: Mikhail Nozhkin; Aleksandr Fatyushin; Sergei Nasibov; Nartai Begalin
- Cinematography: Boris Bondarenko
- Edited by: Svetlana Lyashinskaya
- Music by: Viktor Babushkin
- Distributed by: Mosfilm
- Release date: 1985
- Running time: 96 minutes
- Country: Soviet Union
- Language: Russian

The Detached Mission sometimes translated as Solo Voyage or Solo Journey (Russian: Одиночное плавание, translit. Odinochnoye plavanie) and also known as The Russian Hero is a 1985 Soviet military action film, directed by Mikhail Tumanishvili. In official U.S. Navy parlance, the term "одиночное плавание" corresponds to "independent steaming".

== Plot ==
During the Cold War, a television news journalist aboard the American aircraft carrier USS Nimitz explains the scenario of current fleet exercise of the United States Navy in the central Pacific Ocean. During a live broadcast from the bridge of the Nimitz, the correspondent points out a fleet of "Russian" (Soviet) warships on the horizon commanded by Vice Admiral Chernov.

At the same time, a plainclothed man, later identified as a CIA operative, meets United States Army Major Jack Hessalt, a crazed Vietnam War veteran, who is suffering wartime flashbacks and seems to be on his own private crusade against the Soviets. The CIA man employs Hessalt to gain control over the American missile facility in the central Pacific and launch a false flag attack on a third-party ocean liner, sink it, and make it look like the Soviets have done that.

While the American and Soviet ships track each other, a Soviet frigate with a detachment of Soviet Naval Infantry aboard, under command of Major Shatokhin, is 1,500 miles to the south and prepares to return to their home base from a detached mission (independent steaming exercise).

After arriving at an American military base, Hessalt receives a secret order to launch a missile with a conventional warhead at a passenger cruise ship. A group of CIA and military officers goes golfing together with influential American military industrialists and plans the operation as a part of conspiracy to frame the Soviet Navy. The aim of the operation is to derail an upcoming Soviet-American disarmament summit in order to insure the continued profits of certain defense contractors.

After Hessalt finds out that he and his men are actually expendable and most likely to be assassinated immediately after the completion of their mission, he goes ballistic and takes full control of the base, arming a cruise missile with a nuclear warhead instead of conventional one, and prepares to strike the Soviet squadron so he and his henchmen could escape from the island and disappear among the ensuing chaos.

Meanwhile, an American hipster-lookalike couple, a local airline pilot and his wife, spend their honeymoon on the island near the missile base. Hessalt orders his men to eliminate the witnesses. The woman is killed, but the man managed to escape, shortly thereafter teaming up with the Soviets to punish the villains.

After the Soviet Chief of Naval Staff finds out that Hessalt is acting on his own, he orders Major Shatokhin and his detachment to proceed upon a search and destroy mission to find and neutralize the missile launch site. The Soviets face the difficult task to prevent possible World War III.

== Significance ==
The Detached Mission was filmed and released shortly after the second Rambo installment was released, and according to many observers was the Soviet Union's response to that film. According to the lead actor, Mikhail Nozhkin, this was the last anti-American Soviet movie filmed before the Soviet leadership ordered an end to anything that might irritate the U.S. Government. In a 2006 interview, Nozhkin said,

...they didn't let us film, Gorbachev was already in power, which means chaos had started. A movie on a military theme, and we couldn't get arms, they say, "Here's a Makarov pistol, that's it." They wouldn't give us anything in order to avoid offending the overseas "friends": we are all for peace and so on.

The vessel featured seen leaving port and on the open water was one of two former Cunard Line SAXONIA class ocean liners that was sold by Cunard Line to The Black Sea Shipping Company in 1973.
