= Ivan Bortnik =

Soviet and Russian actor (1939–2019)

Ivan Bortnik PAR
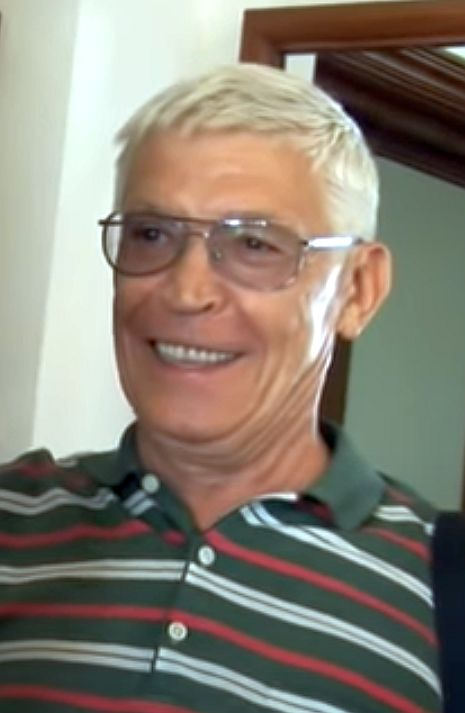
- Born: 16 April 1939; Moscow, Soviet Union
- Died: 4 January 2019 (aged 79); Moscow, Russia
- Education: Boris Shchukin Theatre Institute (Vladimir Etush's course)
- Occupation: Actor
- Years active: 1961–2019
- Spouse: Tatyana Borzykh
- Awards: People's Artist of Russia (2000)

Ivan Sergeyevich Bortnik (Russian: Иван Сергеевич Бортник; 16 April 1939 – 4 January 2019) was a Soviet and Russian film and theater actor. He was a People's Artist of Russia (2000).

He made his film debut in 1961. He was an actor with the Taganka Theatre since 1967. He was a close friend of Russian singer-songwriter, poet, and actor Vladimir Vysotsky.

== Selected filmography ==
- 1962 — Confessions as artist Vasily
- 1976 — Sentimental Romance as Stock controller café
- 1977 — A Declaration of Love as Kroykov
- 1979 — The Meeting Place Cannot Be Changed as Promokashka
- 1981 — Family Relations as Vladimir Konovalov
- 1987 — Mirror for a Hero as Andrei Ivanovich Nemchinov
- 1990 — Death at Movie as Vasily Kuzmich Stolbov
- 1991 — Lost in Siberia as Faina's husband
- 1992 — The Murder at Zhdanovskaya as Gleb Yarin
- 1995 — A Moslem as godfather
- 1996 — The Return of the Battleship as Syrovegin
- 1998 — Mama Don't Cry as offender
- 1999 — Strastnoy Boulevard as a man by the fire
- 2002 — Antikiller as Bedbug
- 2006 — Sonya Golden Hand as staff captain Gorelov
- 2011 — Once Upon a Time There Lived a Simple Woman as episode
