= Alexander Pyatkov =

Soviet and Russian actor

Alexander Alexandrovich Pyatkov (Russian: Александр Александрович Пятков; born July 31, 1950) is a Soviet and Russian film and theater actor.

In 2006 he was awarded the title People's Artist of Russia. In 2003 Pyatkov became a member of the United Russia party.

== Selected filmography ==
- Adventures in a City that Does Not Exist (1974)
- Dersu Uzala (1975)
- In the Zone of Special Attention (1978)
- Nameless Star (1979)
- Hit Back (1981)
- Express on Fire (1981)
- The Circus Princess (1982)
- Along Unknown Paths (1982)
- The Story of Voyages (1982)
- We Are from Jazz (1983)
- The Invisible Man (1984)
- Snake Catcher (1985)
- Forgotten Melody for a Flute (1987)
- Where is the Nophelet? (1988)
- I, a Russian soldier (1995)
- Don't Play the Fool... (1997)
- Peculiarities of the Russian Bath (1999)
- The Sovereign's Servant (2007)
- Lev Yashin. The Goalee of My Dreams (2019)
