= Mirror for a Hero =

- Directed by: Vladimir Khotinenko
- Written by: Nadezhda Kozhushanaya
- Starring: Sergey Koltakov; Ivan Bortnik
- Cinematography: Evgeniy Grebnev
- Music by: Boris Petrov
- Production company: Sverdlovsk Film Studio
- Release dates: March 14, 1987 (Documentary Film Center); April 16, 1988 (Soviet Union)
- Running time: 130 minutes
- Country: Soviet Union
- Language: Russian

Mirror for a Hero (Russian: Зеркало для героя, romanized: Zerkalo dlya geroya) is a 1987 Soviet two-part science fiction drama film directed by Vladimir Khotinenko based on the short story of the same name by Stanislav Rybas.

== Plot ==
Metropolitan psychologist-linguist Sergei Pshenichny (Sergey Koltakov), soon after quarreling with his father (Felix Stepun) on ideological grounds, meets with former mining engineer Andrei Nemchinov (Ivan Bortnik), who recently returned from prison, at a concert by the rock band Nautilus Pompilius.

After the concert, Sergei and Andrei, passing through the city park, see that a film shooting is taking place, about the post-war time. To get a better look at what is happening on the set, they decide to climb over the park fence, but hit some cable lying on the ground and get transferred into the past — in the late 1940s.

But this test for Sergei and his random acquaintance does not end. Every time the night passes and morning begins, the day is always May 8, 1949. They relive the same day over and over again, trying to break the loop. Meanwhile, Sergei gets acquainted with the younger version of his parents (his mother currently being pregnant with him), and Andrei with his 10-year-old self. Eventually the loop breaks and the characters return to the present.

== Cast ==
- Sergey Koltakov as Sergei Pshenichny
- Ivan Bortnik as Andrei Nemchinov
- Felix Stepun as Kirill Pshenichny, the father of Sergei
- Boris Galkin as young Kirill Pshenichny
- Natalia Akimova as young Lida, the mother of Sergei
- Elena Golyanova as Roza
- Yakov Stepanov as Sashka the tanker (voiced by Avangard Leontiev)
- Viktor Smirnov as director of the mine Tyukin
- Nikolai Stotsky as miner Fyodor Petrenko
- Sergey Parshin as Stakhanovite miner Pukharev
- Alexander Peskov as policeman Ryabenko
- Elena Kozlitina as Sergei's wife

== Production ==
Filming took place in the city of Donetsk, and in Donetsk (villages of Abakumov, Karl Marx, Makeyevka, Kurahivka) and Voroshilovgrad (village of Bokovo-Platovo) oblasts.

== Music ==
- At the beginning of the movie, there is the Russian version of Smith's Sérénade from La jolie fille de Perth, an opera by Georges Bizet (singing Gennady Pishchayev).

== Awards and nominations ==
The film's screenwriter Nadezhda Kozhushanaya was nominated for the Nika Award for Best Screenplay in 1988, while director Vladimir Khotinenko received the Special Jury Prize for the film at the All-Union Film Festival in Baku in 1988 and the Vittorio De Sica Prize in Italy in 1989.

== See also ==
- List of films featuring time loops
