= Hit Back =

- Directed by: Mikhail Tumanishvili
- Written by: Yevgeni Mesyatsev
- Starring: Boris Galkin; Vadim Spiridonov; Mihai Volontir; Anatoly Kuznetsov; Alexander Pyatkov; Yelena Glebova
- Music by: Victor Babushkin
- Production company: Mosfilm
- Release date: 1981
- Running time: 84 minutes
- Country: Soviet Union
- Language: Russian

Hit Back (Russian: Ответный ход, translit. Otvetnyy khod) is a 1981 Soviet action war movie directed by Mikhail Tumanishvili. It is a sequel to In the Zone of Special Attention.

== Plot ==
As the military exercises "Shield" come to a close, the "Southern" forces, consisting of a naval fleet, marines, and an airborne regiment, prepare to attack the "Northern" forces defending an airfield with a coastal battery, motorized rifle regiment, and a security battalion. "Northern" saboteurs infiltrate the "Southern" perimeter by hiding in a grain transport vehicle and capture the Southern airborne regiment's chief of staff, along with classified documents, disarming Lieutenant Tarasov (played by Boris Galkin) and Warrant Officer Volentir (Mihai Volontir) in the process.

In response, the Southern command deploys a diversionary squad behind Northern lines, including Tarasov, Volentir, and two marines: Shvets (Vadim Spiridonov) and Zinovyeva (Elena Glebova). The team captures Northern Colonel Moroshkin (Anatoly Kuznetsov), who turns out to have intentionally exposed himself while hiding a radio beacon on his body. Tarasov sees through the deception and foils the pursuit by hiding the beacon in a sheep's wool. The team infiltrates a coastal battery, seizing control of the firing system, and then moves through tunnels to the Northern airfield, where they raid a mobile command post and seize classified documents from General Nefyodov (Anatoly Romashin). Eventually, the Southern commander reveals that the captured documents were a ruse, orders the team to return, and a climactic chase ensues, resulting in Volentir’s injury and a Northern vehicle sinking in a swamp. As the mission ends, the Southern forces begin a full-scale assault.

== Facts ==
It was one of the most attended movies in the Soviet Union in 1981, with an audience of approximately 31.3 million.
