= 72 Meters =

2004 Russian film

- Directed by: Vladimir Khotinenko
- Produced by: Leonid Vereshchagin; Konstantin Ernst; Anatoly Maximov
- Starring: Sergei Makovetsky; Marat Basharov; Andrey Krasko
- Cinematography: Ilya Dyomin
- Music by: Ennio Morricone
- Release date: February 12, 2004
- Running time: 115 minutes
- Country: Russia
- Language: Russian

72 Meters (Russian: 72 метра, romanized: 72 metra) is a 2004 Russian disaster film directed by Vladimir Khotinenko based on the short stories from the collection of stories of the same name by Alexander Pokrovsky.

== Synopsis ==
Officers of the Russian Navy, lieutenant-commanders Pyotr Orlov (Marat Basharov) and Ivan Muravyov (Dmitry Ulyanov) have been members of the Slavyanka submarine crew for a long time. They used to be best friends, but during their service in Sevastopol in the 1980s, they met a beautiful girl Nelly (Chulpan Khamatova) and fell in love with her at first sight. Nelly chose Ivan, and their friendship fractured.

In the early 1990s, after the dissolution of the Soviet Union and partition of the Soviet Navy, the crew of Slavyanka refused to swear allegiance to Ukraine and were transferred to the Northern Fleet. After that, life and service took their quiet routine course. During an ordinary sortie Captain Gennady Yanychar (Andrey Krasko) sets a task to conduct a torpedo attack against a maneuver enemy and take evasive action keeping undetected for 24 hours. Among the crew is civilian medical specialist Chernenko (Sergey Makovetsky).

No-one in the training center knows where the submarine would move. Unknown to the crew, an old World War II naval mine was disturbed. It slowly moved towards the submarine and explodes, sinking it. Only one compartment remains unflooded. Several crew members die in the result of the explosion, including the submarine's commander, Captain Yanychar. The submariners decide to get out though the torpedo tube, but it turns out that only one breathing apparatus is charged and can be used; the rest are empty. The crew decides that Chernenko has to be the one saved first. They instruct him how to act during resurfacing. Chernenko successfully reaches the surface and gets to ground. It remains unknown whether the crew was saved.

== Cast ==
- Sergei Makovetsky as physician Chernenko
- Marat Basharov as Captain-Lieutenant Pyotr Orlov
- Andrey Krasko as 1st Class Captain Gennadi Yanychar
- Dmitriy Ulyanov as Captain-Lieutenant Ivan Murav'yov
- Chulpan Khamatova as Nelly
- Stanislav Nikolski as Seaman Molodoy
- Sergey Garmash as Senior Warrant Officer Nikolai Krauz
- Vladislav Galkin as Senior Warrant Officer Mikhajlov
- Amadu Mamadakov as Sailor Mukhambetov
- Valentina Svetlova as Elena, Gennadi's wife
- Artyom Mikhalkov as Nechayev
