= The Swarm (1990 film) =

1990 film by Vladimir Khotinenko

- Russian: Рой
- Directed by: Vladimir Khotinenko
- Written by: Sergei Alekseyev (novel); Vladimir Khotinenko; Violetta Sedova; Valeri Zalotukha
- Starring: Vladimir Ilyin; Cheslav Sushkevich; Ivan Agafonov; V. Andrianov; Oleg Belov
- Cinematography: Evgeniy Grebnev
- Edited by: Svetlana Tarik
- Music by: Boris Petrov
- Release date: 1990
- Running time: 2 hours 28 minutes
- Country: Soviet Union
- Language: Russian

The Swarm (Russian: Рой) is a 1990 Soviet drama film directed by Vladimir Khotinenko.

== Plot ==
The film tells about the life of the Zavarzins family, who in 1909 went to live in Siberia and founded an apiary there.

== Cast ==
- Vladimir Ilyin
- Cheslav Sushkevich
- Ivan Agafonov
- V. Andrianov
- Oleg Belov
- Aleksandr Cheskidov
- Natalya Churkina
- Sergey Fetisov
- Boris Galkin
- Gennadiy Garbuk
