= Crash – Cop's Daughter =

- Directed by: Mikhail Tumanishvili
- Screenplay by: Yuri Korotkov
- Starring: Vladimir Ilyin; Oksana Arbuzova
- Cinematography: Boris Bondarenko
- Edited by: Svetlana Lyashinskaya
- Music by: Viktor Babushkin
- Production companies: Mosfilm; Studio Slovo
- Release date: 1989
- Running time: 94 minutes
- Country: Soviet Union
- Language: Russian

Crash – Cop's Daughter (Russian: Авария – дочь мента, romanized: Avariya – doch menta) is a 1989 Soviet drama film directed by Mikhail Tumanishvili.

== Plot ==
Valeria is a delinquent schoolgirl nicknamed "Crash", whose father, Aleksei Nikolaev, is a senior police lieutenant. Nikolayev has divided loyalties: on the one hand he has to arrest punks like Crash, while on the other he has to pick up his daughter from the police department where she, along with other representatives of youth subculture, has been brought in for public order violations. The conflict between father and daughter is set against the backdrop of the dissolution of the Soviet Union, when even schoolteachers cannot explain to their students why what they say changes every day.

Crash's wild life, which includes staying out all night and self-harm, culminates in a gang rape by a group of rich young men. This tragedy brings father and daughter closer together. Nikolayev subsequently sets out to take revenge on the perpetrators, defying the law which he has spent his life defending. The thugs die in a car accident. Nikolayev is promptly arrested by his colleagues, and Valeria asks for her father's forgiveness.

== Cast ==
- Oksana Arbuzova – Valeria Nikolayeva, "Crash"
- Vladimir Ilyin – Aleksei Nikolayev, Valeria's father
- Anastasia Voznesenskaya – Vera Nikolayeva, Valeria's mother
- Nikolai Pastukhov – Valeria's grandfather
- Boris Romanov – Andrei Olegovich
- Oleg Tsaryov – Operator, a guy from the white fiver (VAZ-2105 car)
- Igor Nefyodov – Bald, a guy from the white fiver
- Sergei Vorobiev – Bob, the driver of the white fiver
- Yuri Shumilo – Alik, a guy from the white fiver
- Lyubov Sokolova – Julia Nikolaevna, history teacher
- Alexander Potapov – Nikolai, police sergeant
- Vladimir Basov, Jr. – a pimp
- Alexander Zaldostanov – biker

== Shooting ==
- The lead role in the film was initially offered to Natalya Guseva, star of the TV series Guest from the Future (1985). However, after reading the script, she declined it, saying she did not want to sully the clean-cut image of her earlier character, Alisa Selezneva.
