= Aleksandr Fatyushin =

Soviet and Russian actor

- Александр Фатюшин
- Born: Aleksandr Konstantinovich Fatyushin; March 29, 1951; Ryazan, USSR
- Died: April 6, 2003 (aged 52); Moscow, Russia
- Occupation: actor
- Years active: 1974–2003
- Spouse: Elena Molchenko (1986-2003)
- Awards: Honored Artist of the RSFSR (1984); USSR State Prize(1984)

Aleksandr Konstantinovich Fatyushin (Russian: Александр Константинович Фатюшин; 29 March 1951 — 6 April 2003) was a Soviet and Russian film and theater actor. In 1984, he was the Honored Artist of the RSFSR and the winner of the USSR State Prize.

Fatyushin played in more than 40 films. He worked at the Mayakovsky Theatre.

He died on April 6, 2003, in his Moscow apartment after complications from pneumonia. The actor was buried on April 9 at the Memory Alley of outstanding athletes and coaches of the Vostryakovskoye Cemetery in Moscow (station number 131).

== Filmography ==
- 1974 — Аutumn as Eduard
- 1977 — Office Romance as Vera's husband (cameo)
- 1978 — Cure for Fear as police captain Tikhonov
- 1979 — Moscow Does Not Believe in Tears as Sergei Gurin
- 1980 — Expectation as Igor
- 1981 — Express on Fire as Alexander Mukhanov
- 1985 — The Detached Mission as ensign Kruglov
- 1988 — The Life of Klim Samgin as Lyutov
- 1990 — Code of Silence as Valentin Silov
- 1991 — Wolfhound as Vova
- 1991 — Taganka Go on Тanks as Professor, the head physician of the psychiatric hospital
- 1994 — Petersburg Secrets as Egor Dmitrievich Beroev
- 1999 — Loving in Russian 3: The Governor as Pavlenok
- 2001 — Mechanical Suite as Lebedev
- 2003 — And In The Morning They Woke Up as shaper
