= Hourglass (film) =

- Theatrical release poster
- Directed by: Sergei Vronsky
- Screenplay by: Semyon Frejlikh, Sergei Vronsky
- Starring: Anatoly Kuznetsov, Nikolay Skorobogatov, Galina Polskikh
- Cinematography: Fyodor Dobronravov, Viktor Shestopyorov
- Music by: Vladimir Belousov, Stas Namin
- Production company: Mosfilm
- Release date: 9 July 1984
- Running time: 89 min
- Country: Soviet Union
- Language: Russian

Hourglass (Russian: Песочные часы, romanized: Pesochnye chasy) is a 1984 Soviet melodrama film directed by Sergei Vronsky and starring Anatoly Kuznetsov, Nikolay Skorobogatov, Galina Polskikh.

== Plot ==
At the resort, chance brings together Grebentsov and Panshin, former fellow soldiers. Grebentsov had once vacationed in these places, and then he had an affair with a beautiful local girl, Nadya. And now she appears again in Grebentsov's life. The past enters the present and may change tomorrow.

== Cast ==
- Anatoly Kuznetsov as Grebentsov
- Nikolay Skorobogatov as Panshin
- Galina Polskikh as Nadya
- Lyudmila Karaush as Lyudmila
- Lyudmila Nilskaya as Inga
- Igor Sklyar as Sergey
- Vadim Terentyev as Bauer
- Maya Blinova as Bauer's wife
- German Kachin as Driver
- Vladimir Artyomov as Yura Atlanov
- Nina Maslova as Galya
- Aleksandra Sorokoumova as Veronika
- Anatoliy Skoryakin as Andrey

In one of the episodes, together with actor Anatoly Kuznetsov starred his wife and ten-year-old daughter.

== Production ==
Filming took place in Kislovodsk, Stavropol Krai.

== Release ==
The film was theatrically released on July 9, 1984. The film also was screened on Soviet TV in 1987–1990 after its theatrical run.

== Response ==
Yuri Nagibin, considering the roles of Anatoly Kuznetsov, who plays the main role in the film, wrote that in this film there was a transition in his role:

The image of the artist expanded from a "warrior" to a "front-line soldier". Grebentsov wears a regular civilian suit, not a gymnosperm or a tunic, he does not crawl with a grenade to the enemy trench, he does not command in battle, but leads an industrial headquarters, but much of his behavior today comes from front-line upbringing, from what was experienced in the fields of war. And yet, the war is dissolved in the blood of all those who have at least seen that black and great time as a child. The main creative task of Anatoly Kuznetsov organically included the theme: who have you become, front-line soldier?

The only film as a director of cinematographer Sergei Vronsky, the film is considered forgotten:

In "Hourglass" he will tell the story of front-line soldiers who return to the southern town where they once fought, loved... a meeting "twenty years later" can change fate. Unfortunately, television has forgotten about this film. Will they remember for the Victory Day?
