= Sergei Vronsky =

Russian cinematographer (1923–2003)

Sergei Arkadyevich Vronsky (Russian: Сергей Аркадьевич Вронский, 3 September 1923, Rostov-on-Don – 21 June 2003, Moscow) was a Soviet cinematographer, film director and screenwriter. He graduated from the Gerasimov Institute of Cinematography in 1953 and worked with Ivan Pyryev and Georgiy Daneliya.

== Filmography ==
- The Blizzard (1964)
- Thirty Three (1965)
- The Brothers Karamazov (1969)
- Taming of the Fire (1972)
- Gypsies Are Found Near Heaven (1975)
- Afonya (1975)
- The Tavern on Pyatnitskaya (1978)
- Autumn Marathon (1979)
- White Snow of Russia (1980)
- Hourglass (1984; director and screenwriter only)
- Aelita, Do Not Pester Men! (1988)

== Awards and honours ==
- Honoured Worker of the Arts Industry of the RSFSR (1969)
- Vasilyev Brothers State Prize of the RSFSR (1981) – for film Autumn Marathon
