= Armavir (film) =

- Russian poster
- Russian: Армавир
- Directed by: Vadim Abdrashitov
- Written by: Aleksandr Mindadze
- Starring: Sergey Koltakov; Sergey Shakurov; Elena Shevchenko; Sergey Garmash; Maria Stroganova
- Cinematography: Denis Evstigneev
- Edited by: Roza Rogatkina
- Music by: Vladimir Dashkevich
- Production company: Mosfilm
- Release date: 1991
- Running time: 131 minutes
- Country: Soviet Union
- Language: Russian

Armavir (Russian: Армавир) is a 1991 Soviet drama film directed by Vadim Abdrashitov.

== Plot ==
Passenger vessel Armavir is shipwrecked. In search of Marina, who is among the surviving passengers, are her father and her husband, who hate each other. They find her after a long search, but she does not recognize them.

== Cast ==
- Sergey Koltakov as Semin
- Sergey Shakurov as Aksyuta
- Elena Shevchenko as Marina-Larisa
- Sergey Garmash as Ivan
- Maria Stroganova as Natasha
- Pyotr Zaychenko as Neptune
- Rim Ayupov as 'Katala'
- Natalya Potapova
- Aleksandr Vdovin
- Zhanat Baizhanbayev as Timur
