= A Moslem =

1995 film

- Film poster
- Directed by: Vladimir Khotinenko
- Written by: Valeri Zalotukha
- Starring: Yevgeny Mironov
- Cinematography: Aleksei Rodionov
- Edited by: Svetlana Tarik
- Music by: Alexander Pantykin
- Distributed by: Russian Film Committee
- Release date: 23 April 1995
- Running time: 110 minutes
- Country: Russia
- Language: Russian

A Moslem (Russian: Мусульманин, romanized: Musulmanin) is a 1995 Russian drama film directed by Vladimir Khotinenko. The film was selected as the Russian entry for the Best Foreign Language Film at the 68th Academy Awards, but was not accepted as a nominee.

== Cast ==
- Yevgeny Mironov as Kolya Ivanov the Mussulman
- Aleksandr Baluev as Fedya, Kolya's brother
- Nina Usatova as Sonya, Kolya's mother
- Evdokiya Germanova as Verka
- Alexander Peskov as Unknown (political officer in the military unit, where Kolya served)
- Ivan Bortnik as Kolya's godfather
- Sergey Taramaev as Holy Father Mikhail
- Pyotr Zaychenko as Pavel Petrovich
- Vladimir Ilyin as Gena the shepherd

== Awards ==
- Award of Montreal World Film Festival: Special Grand Prix of the jury - "Best film of the year" (1995)
- Awards of Kinotavr: "Best Actress", "Best Actor" (1995)
- Nika Award: "Best Screenplay", "Best Actress", "Best a Supporting Role" (1996)
- Awards of International Festival of Orthodox film "Golden Knight": "Best Director", "Best Screenplay", "Best Actress" (1995)
- Awards of Russia cinema press: "Best film", "Best Actor" (1995)

== See also ==
- List of submissions to the 68th Academy Awards for Best Foreign Language Film
- List of Russian submissions for the Academy Award for Best Foreign Language Film
