= An Easy Life =

- Title image
- Directed by: Veniamin Dorman
- Written by: Vladlen Bakhnov
- Starring: Yury Yakovlev; Faina Ranevskaya; Nadezhda Rumyantseva
- Cinematography: Konstantin Arutyunov
- Music by: Nikita Bogoslovsky
- Distributed by: Gorky Film Studio
- Release date: 1964
- Running time: 90 minutes
- Country: Soviet Union
- Language: Russian

An Easy Life (Russian: Лёгкая жизнь, romanized: Lyogkaya zhizn') is a 1964 satirical Soviet comedy film directed by Veniamin Dorman. It was seen by 24.6 million Soviet moviegoers during its initial release.

== Plot ==
A chemist by training, Alexandr Petrovich Bochkin (Yury Yakovlev) manages a Moscow dry-cleaning operation, but lives a very comfortable life, taking orders on the side for his speculative "private enterprise," run in conjunction with "Queen Margot" (Faina Ranevskaya). But when his old friend from the chemical institute, Yuri Lebedev (Vsevolod Safonov) arrives in Moscow from the Siberian city of Dalnegorsk, along with a traveling companion, Olga (Ninel Myshkova), Bochkin becomes uncomfortable with his job title. He decides to tell his friends that he is a scientist working on top-secret experiments for the government, but eventually this cover story backfires, leading to one misunderstanding after the other.

== Cast ==
- Yury Yakovlev as Alexander Petrovich Bochkin, underground entrepreneur
- Faina Ranevskaya as "Queen Margot", Margarita Ivanovna, profiteer
- Vera Maretskaya as Vasilisa Sergeevna
- Rostislav Plyatt as Vladimir Gavrilovich Muromtsev, Vasilisa's husband
- Ninel Myshkova as Olga, Vasilisa's sister
- Nadezhda Rumyantseva as Galya, Bochkin's sister
- Vsevolod Safonov as Yuri Lebedev, Bochkin's friend, chief engineer at the plant in Dalnogorsk
- Lyusyena Ovchinnikova as Masha
- Natalia Golubentseva
