= Express on Fire =

- Directed by: Andrei Malyukov
- Written by: Vsevolod Ivanov; Andrei Malyukov
- Starring: Lev Durov; Elena Mayorova; Aleksandr Fatyushin
- Cinematography: Yuri Gantman
- Music by: Mark Minkov
- Production company: Mosfilm
- Release date: 1981
- Running time: 78 minutes
- Country: Soviet Union
- Language: Russian

Express on Fire (Russian: 34-й скорый, romanized: 34-y skoryy, 34th Express) is a 1981 Soviet disaster film directed by Andrei Malyukov.

== Cast ==
- Peteris Gaudinsh — Pyotr (voiced by Leonid Belozorovich)
- Oleg Golubitsky — Semyon Ignatievich, the head of the train
- Lev Durov — Mikhail (Clown of the Cartoon)
- Vadim Ivanov — episode (uncredited)
- Valentina Klyagina — Zina, the conductor
- Veronica Kovtun — owner of an antique store (uncredited)
- Galina Kravchenko — a passenger with a dog
- Elena Mayorova — conductor Seraphima Steshkova
- Grigory Malikov — cadet
- Alexander Massarsky — episode
- Algimantas Masiulis — Boris (voiced by Felix Yavorsky)
- Daniil Netrebin — Egorich, the train driver
- Svetlana Orlova — passenger of the 8th wagon, stewardess
- Irina Pechernikova — a stowaway passenger
- Alexander Pyatkov — Sashka, employee of the dining car
- Valery Ryzhakov — stowaway passenger
- Alexander Ryshchenkov — Yura, newlywed
- Vladimir Sirota — second assistant to the machinist
- Konstantin Titov — episode (uncredited)
- Leonid Trutnev — Assistant Engineer
- Aleksandr Fatyushin — Alexander Mukhanov, stowaway passenger
- Natalia Florenskaya — a young mother with a child
- Natalya Khorokhorina — Vera, barmaid
- Lyudmila Tsvetkova — episode
- Stanislav Chechin — episode
- Marina Shimanskaya — Raisa Kostina, the bride
- Vasily Badaev — episode
- Zoya Vasilkova — episode (uncredited)
- Anatoly Vedenkin — passenger with a guitar
- Vyacheslav Ezepov — passenger—speculator
