= Boris Galkin =

Soviet and Russian actor (born 1947)

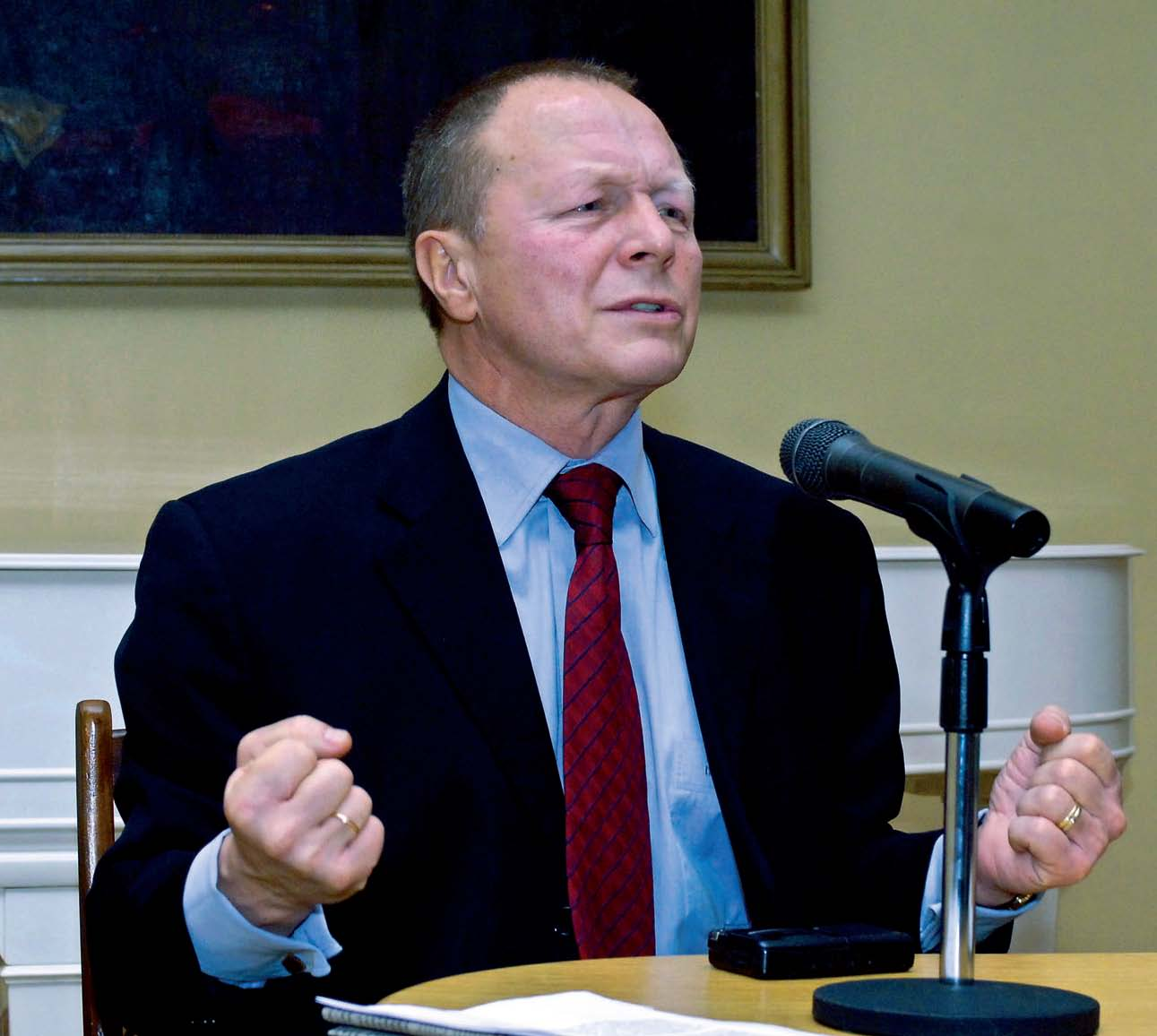
- Galkin in 2015
- Born: 19 September 1947 (age 78); Leningrad, Soviet Union
- Education: Boris Shchukin Theatre Institute
- Occupation: Actor
- Years active: 1969–present
- Children: 3

Boris Sergeevich Galkin (Russian: Бори́с Серге́евич Га́лкин; born 19 September 1947) is a Soviet and Russian stage, film actor, director, composer and television presenter. In 1981, Galkin received the Lenin Komsomol Prize and in 1999 was awarded the title of Merited Artist of the Russian Federation.

Galkin is most notably recognised for his role as Viktor Pavlovich Tarasov in the 1977 film In the Zone of Special Attention.

== Early life ==
Boris Sergeevich Galkin was born in the city of Leningrad on 19 September 1947, the son of Sergei Mikhailovich Galkin (1911-1985) and Svetlana Georgievna Galkina (née Zader, 1924-2006), a distant relation to the narodnik Olimpia Kutuzova.

== Career ==
In 1969, Galkin graduated from the Boris Shchukin Theatre Institute alongside Nina Ruslanova, Alexander Kaidanovsky, Leonid Filatov, Natalya Gurzo, Vladimir Kachan, Ivan Dykhovichny, Lyudmila Kupina and Yan Arlazorov. Following this, Galkin worked as an actor and director in various theatres in Moscow and Novgorod, most notably the Taganka Theatre from 1971 to 1977.

In 1977, Galkin graduated from the Lunacharsky State Institute for Theatre Arts (GITIS).

Since 1996 Galkin has served as the Deputy Director for production at the Gorky Film Studio.

From 2005 to 2008, Galkin was president of the Russian Film Actors Guild.

== Personal life ==
Boris Galkin has been married four times, with an adopted son and daughter from his third wife Elena Demidova, and a daughter from his fourth wife Inna Razumikhina.

=== Political views ===
Galkin was a staunch supporter of the separatist cause during the War in Donbas, travelling to the disputed territories several times and reportedly maintaining a relationship with the Head of the Donetsk People's Republic Alexander Zakharchenko. In 2017, he was added to the controversial Myrotvorets website.

In March 2022, Galkin penned an open letter to defend Russia's military actions in Ukraine, framing the conflict as a necessary defence against long standing Western encroachment. Later that month, Galkin was included in a list of 150 Russian cultural figures in a letter supporting the actions of President Vladimir Putin. In response, he was declared Persona non grata by the Ministry of Foreign Affairs of Latvia and was banned from entry into the country.

Galkin has expressed harsh criticism towards prominent Russian emigrees such as Alla Pugacheva, portraying them as detached elite who grew wealthy off the Russian public only to abandon and look down on them during a crisis.

== Filmography ==
=== Film ===
Year	Title	Role	Notes
1969	Echo of Distant Snow	Alyosha	
1970	City of First Love	Filipp	
1972	Sveaborg	Arkady Emelyanov	
1974	A Friend to Foes, a Foe to Friends	Messenger	
1975	A Slave of Love	Trofimenko	
1976	Sentimental Romance	Stepan	
1977	In the Zone of Special Attention	Guards Lieutenant Viktor Pavlovich Tarasov	
1978	Pugachev	Nikita Stroev	
1979	The Adventure of the Blue Carbuncle	James Ryder	
1979	Kapitan Sovri-golova	Father of the Zavitaikin family	
1980	Citizen Lyoshka	Lyoshka Ignatov	
1980	White Snow of Russia	Salo Flohr	
1980	Lyudi V Okeane	Sanya Pryakhin	
1981	Hit Back	Guards Captain Viktor Pavlovich Tarasov	
1981	Waiting for Colonel Shalygin	Private Pyotr Ivanovich Gelov	
1982	Dykhanie grozy	Ales	
1982	The Journey Will Be Pleasant	Gennady	
1984	Alone and Unarmed	Sonny	
1985	Matveeva radost	Matvey	
1986	Obvinyaetsya svadba	Falya	
1987	Straw Bells	Police Officer	
1987	Action	Egor Ivanovich Semin	
1987	Mirror for a Hero	Kirill Ivanovich Pshenichny	
1987	I Want to be a Bright Boy	Narrator	
1988	Everyone Loves Someone	Gregory	
1988	Working on Mistakes	Principal	
1989	Knyaz Udacha Andreevich	Vladimir Elkhov	
1989	Humble Grave	Garik	
1990	The Swarm	Victor Zavarzin	
1990	The Executioner	Sasha Zavalishin	
1991	Blood for Blood	Valek "Sobol", Repeat offender Valentin Stepanovich Somov	
1991	Poka grom ne gryanet	Butcher	
1992	Remember the Scent of Lilac	Pakhomov	
1994	Black Clown	Axel Birkamp	
1995	Muzhskoy talisman	Lieutenant Colonel Orlov	
2005	Shadow Hunt	Andrey Savin, Colonel of the Ministry of Internal Affairs of Ukraine	
2006	Quake	FSB General Vershinin	
2007	Stealth X	Krasnov	
2008	Black Hunters	Emelyanov	
2009	Whispers of Orange Clouds	Anatoly Ganich (Coach)	
2010	Caravan Hunters	Colonel General of the Soviet Ministry of Defence	
2012	Surprise Me	Andrey Filippovich	
2012	Hunting For Gauleiter	Andrey Nikolaevich Silantiev	
2013	Queen of Bandits	Kozyr	
2014	Doroga Domoy	Egor Timofeevich Gerasimov	
2018	Pulya	Ivan Ivanovich Romanov	
2022	My Friend the Seal	Grandfather Sasha	
2022	By the White Sea	Nikolai	

=== Television ===
Year	Title	Role	Notes
1975	Such a Short Long Life	Igor	Season 2, Episode 4, 5, 6 and 8
1983	The Adolescent	Kraft	
1987	Sud v Yershovke	Rogachev	
2000	Maroseyka, 12	Colonel Durov	
2001	Blyustiteli poroka	Killer	
2002	Right of Defence	Tolya	
2002	Taiga: Survival	Sergey Petrovich	
2007	On the Bridge	Nikitin	
2008	The Father of Paratroopers	Colonel General Petrov, Deputy Commander of the Soviet Airborne Forces	
2009	Werewolf Hunt	Major Oleg Grishin	
2009-2011	Retired	Colonel Sergei Mikhailovich Devov	
2011	PPS	Colonel Konstantin Grogorievich Nadezhdin	
2011	Retribution	Nikolai Petrovich Spasov	
2011	Sdelano V SSSR	Ivan Grigorievich Shishov	
2015	Nerds	Viktor Tarasov	
2019	Retired: One for All	Colonel Sergei Mikhailovich Devov	
2019	Retired: Save the Enemy	Colonel Sergei Mikhailovich Devov	
2019	Staryye kadry	Ivan Dolin	
2020	Pod prikrytiem	Egor Fomich Bakhrushin	
2021	Topor 1943	Marshal Georgy Zhukov	
2023	Retired: Defence of Dedov	Colonel Sergei Mikhailovich Devov	
2023	Retired: Close Combat	Colonel Sergei Mikhailovich Devov	

== Awards ==
- A. P. Dovzhenko Medal (1978) - for playing the role of Guards Lieutenant Viktor Pavlovich Tarasov in the film In the Zone of Special Attention (1977).
- Lenin Komsomol Prize (1981)
- Merited Artist of the Russian Federation (1999)
- Prize of the Russian Ministry of Defence in the field of culture and art (2017) - for theatrical art
- Russian National Prize for Imperial Culture named after Eduard Volodin (2023)
- Russian National Acting Award named after Andrei Mironov "Figaro" (2023)
- Amet-khan Sultan Medal (2024) - Awarded by the Republic of Dagestan. For contributions to the patriotic education of youth, and services in the development of arts and culture.
- Diploma "Best performance of an adult actor in a childrens film" - for "My Friend the Seal" (2026)
