= Anatoly Kuznetsov (actor) =

Soviet and Russian actor (1930–2014)

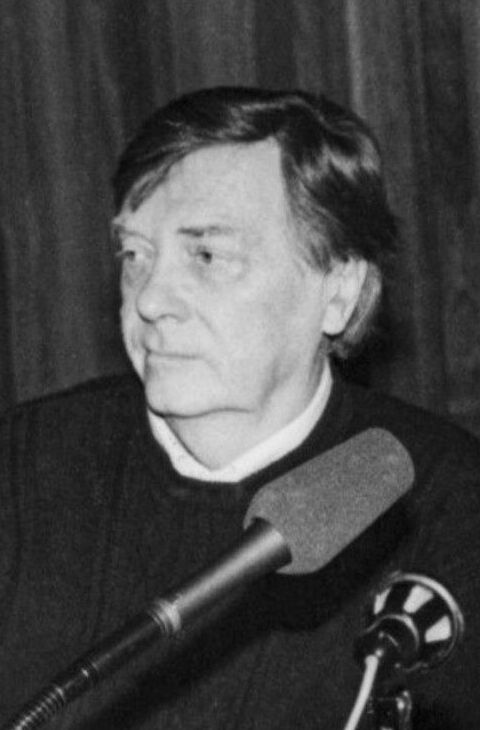
- 26 November 1995
- Born: Anatoly Borisovich Kuznetsov; 31 December 1930; Moscow, Russian SFSR, Soviet Union
- Died: 7 March 2014 (aged 83); Moscow, Russia
- Occupation: Actor

Anatoly Borisovich Kuznetsov (Russian: Анатолий Борисович Кузнецов; 31 December 1930 – 7 March 2014) was a Soviet and Russian actor, best known for his role of the Red Army soldier Fyodor Sukhov in White Sun of the Desert (1970). His cousin Mikhail was also an actor. Anatoly Kuznestov was named as People's Artist of the RSFSR in 1979. He lived and worked in Moscow.

== Biography ==
Kuznetsov was born and grew up in Moscow, in the family of Russian singer Boris Kuznetsov. He studied music at the Ippolitov-Ivanov Music School, but later went into acting and graduated from the Moscow Art Theatre School in 1955. Since 1958 he worked at the Moscow Film Actor Theater. He broke into films playing one of the main characters in Dangers Trails with Druzhnikov while been a student.

== Death ==
He committed suicide on 7 March 2014 at the age of 83.

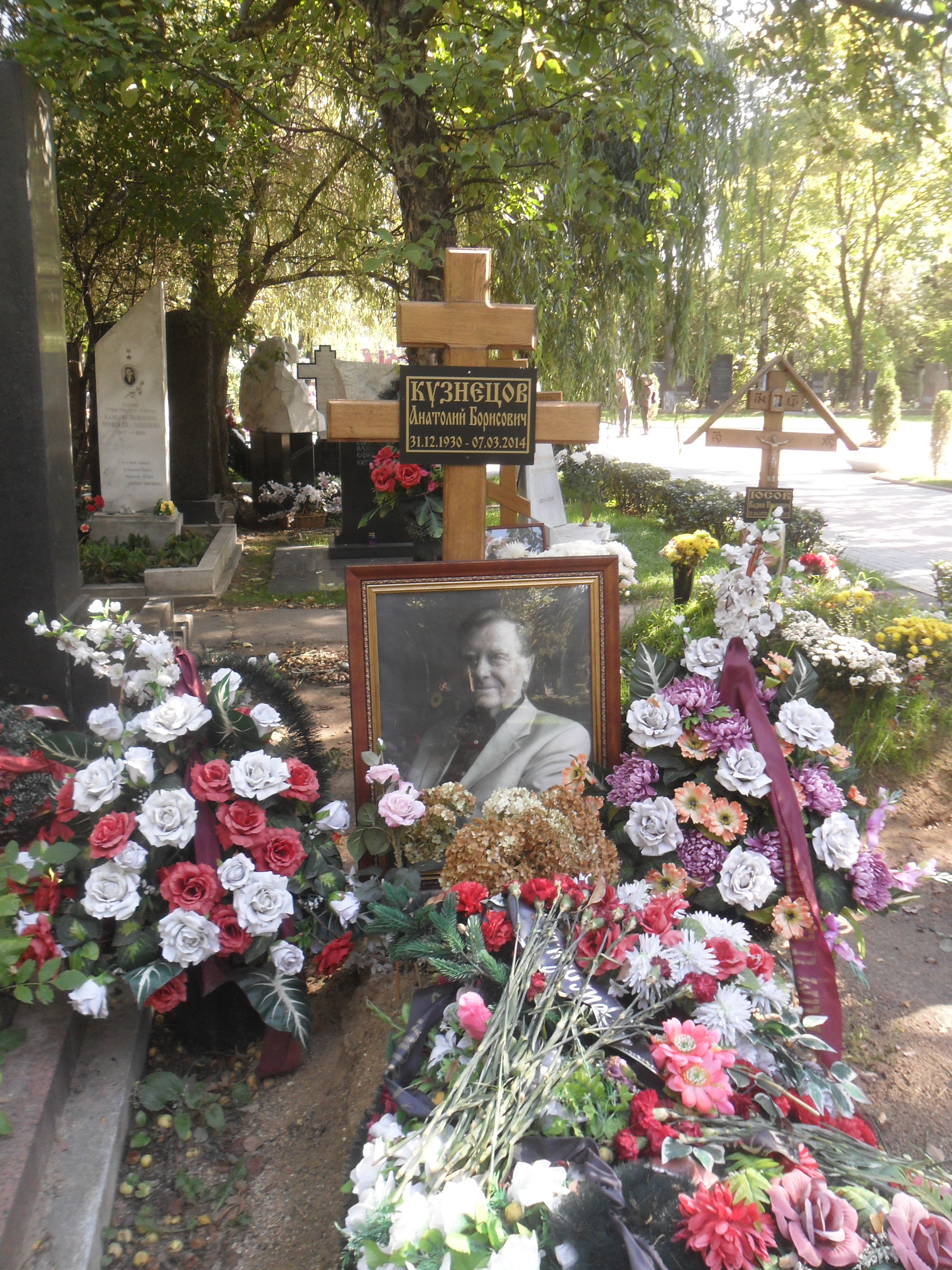
The grave in the Novodevichy Cemetery in Moscow

== Selected filmography ==
- Dangerous Paths (1955) as Nikolay Zholudev
- Guest from Kuban (1956) as Nikolay Vorobtsov
- Behind Show Windows (1956) as Lieutenant Malyutkin
- Journey to Youth (1957) as Petrov
- Mine Eight Case (1958) as Batanin
- To the Black Sea (1958) as Nikolay Kukushkin
- On the Roads of War (1959) as Sushkov
- Furtuna (1959) as Major Andreev
- Tale of the Newlyweds (1960) as Vladimir Solodukhin
- Wait for Letters (1960) as Leonid
- My Friend, Kolka! (1961) as Rudenko
- How I Was Independent (1963) as Lyosha's father
- Morning Trains (1963) as Pavel
- Planes Didn't Land (1964, voice)
- Give Me a Book of Complaints (1965) as Ivan Kondakov
- Conscience (1966) as Martyanov
- Song Wings (1967) as Musa (voice)
- Woman's World (1967) as Jean Petrichenkov
- Spring on the Oder (1968) as Lubentsov
- Encounters at Dawn (1969) as Sergei Sergeevich Volkov
- On the Way to Lenin (1969) as Secretary of the District Committee
- White Sun of the Desert (1970) as Fyodor Sukhov
- Meine Stunde Null (1970) as Oberleutnant Gornin
- Otkradnatiyat vlak (1971) as General Pyotr Petrovich
- Liberation (1971, part 4) as Georgy Zakharov
- Hot Snow (1972) as Vesnin
- Kato pesen (1973) as Russian officer
- Life on Sinful Earth (1973) as Pavel Demidov
- И на Тихом океане... (1974) as Ilya Gerasimovich Peklevanov
- Okovani soferi (1975) as Sergeyev
- Bratushka (1976) as Ales Ivanovich Kazanok
- Live Your Way (1976) as Vasily Balyshev
- Jeden stribrny (1976) as Laco Tatar
- Po sekretu vsemu svetu (1976) as the hitcher with raspberries
- Incognito from St. Petersburg (1978) as Lyapkin-Tyapkin
- In the Zone of Special Attention (1978) as Mayor Morozhkyn
- Right of First Signature (1978) as Sergey Andreyevich Savelyev
- Last Chance (1978) as Kirill Dmitrievich
- Native Business (1979) as Grachyov
- Second Spring (1980) as Nesterov
- Hordubal (1980) as Juraj Hordubal
- Hit Back (1981) as Morozhkyn
- Incident at Map Grid 36-80 (1982) as General Pavlov
- Adventures of Petrov and Vasechkin, Usual and Incredible (1983) as cameo
- Lucky Streak (1983) as deputy director of the institute
- The Comet (1984) as Kuchkin
- Hourglass (1984) as Stepan Grebentsov
- Copper Angel (1984) as engineer Kurmayev
- Reporting from the Line of Fire (1985) as member of the military council
- Liberty Is on the Opposite Bank (1985) as Smirnov
- Five Minutes of Fear (1985) as Kornilov
- Battle of Moscow (1985) as officer (uncredited)
- Misty Shores (1986) as Colonel Egoriev
- Was Not Was (1986) as Yuriy
- Without Sun (1987) as Mikhail Ivanovich Kostylev
- Jackals (1990) as deputy
- Nipple System (1990) as Lazar Fomich Bambook
- Russian Roulette (1990) as Fedor Andreevich
- Flying Dutchman (1990) as Matvey Fomich
- Dinosaurs of 20th Century (1990) as Colonel Kryuchkov
- Genius (1992) as Valentin Smirnov, Nastya's father
- Tractor Drivers 2 (1992) as farm director, Maryana's father
- Istanbul Transit (1993) as Nikolai Yevgenievich
- Asleep Passenger (1994) as Aleksandr Ivanovich Smirnov
- Shirli-Myrli (1995) as father
- Za co? (1996) as Ivan Gavrilovich
- Paradise Apple (1998) as Igor Igorevich
- Hot Saturday (2002) as Boris Semyonovich
- Black Mark (2003) as Heydar Aliev (voice)
- Turkish Gambit (2005) as Ivan Ganetsky
- Nobody Knows About Sex (2006) as Yegor's grandfather
- Victory Day (2007) as Andrei Nikolenko
