= Incident at Map Grid 36-80 =

- Soviet military pilots before proceeding on the mission. Left to right: Maj. Volk (Boris Shcherbakov), Capt. Skiba (Mihai Volontir), Prap. Gudkov (Valery Malyshev), Lieut. Pavlov (Boris Tokarev).
- Directed by: Mikhail Tumanishvili
- Screenplay by: Yevgeni Mesyatsev
- Cinematography: Boris Bondarenko
- Music by: Victor Babushkin
- Production company: Mosfilm
- Distributed by: Sovexportfilm
- Release date: December 7, 1982 (USSR)
- Running time: 93 minutes
- Country: Soviet Union
- Language: Russian

Incident at Map Grid 36-80 (Russian: Случай в квадрате 36-80, romanized: Sluchay v kvadrate 36-80) is a 1982 Soviet military action movie by Mikhail Tumanishvili. The total number of Soviet viewers was estimated at 33,100,000 people.

== Plot ==
The film is set in the 1980s, when Soviet Naval Aviation Tu-16 pilots risk death to help stop an American submarine whose defective reactor threatens a nuclear meltdown.

The Soviet Navy conducts military exercises in the Atlantic Ocean. Exercises of the US Navy are held in the same area. The main element of the American exercises is training for the attack on the Soviet task force from a multipurpose nuclear submarine. A special Hughes computer is capable of launching missiles at targets previously programmed into warheads, without human intervention. The computer provides full automation of the launching process of guided missiles. However, to start it is necessary to unlock the control panel in the cabin of the submarine commanded by Turner.

The crew of the air tanker under the command of Major Gennady Volk performs the usual task of aerial refueling of the reconnaissance aircraft in the exercise area. The commander of Northern Fleet aviation, Major General Pavlov, intends to select the most capable pilots for retraining for new aircraft. Curious about Volk, he replaces the co-pilot before departure. For some unknown reason, Volk nevertheless refuses re-training and further promotion, trying to advance the navigator of his crew, veteran airman Sergei Skiba.

The Tu-16 refuels reconnaissance aircraft, and at this time meets the American anti-submarine aircraft P-3 Orion, which covers Turner's submarine. It turns out that its commander, Major Armstrong, and Volk are “old acquaintances”. Pilots communicate on the air.

In the meantime, a state of emergency occurs on the submarine - reactor specialist Alan detects a leak in the reactor's cooling circuit. Turner intends not to surface the submarine and orders Alan to fix the damage. However, the failure cannot be fixed, and the submarine is forced to surface. She is discovered by the Soviet forces, but the Americans claim that everything is in order.

Alan, who received the strongest dose of radiation, understands that help can only be received from the Soviet military. Therefore, he sneaks into the cabin of the captain and removes the lock from the fire control system. Then he rushes into the radio room and, having pushed the signalman out, sends the SOS signal. But when Alan tries to escape from the submarine on a raft, Turner kills Alan.

Soviet reconnaissance aircraft are tracking the SOS from the submarine and recording elevated levels of radiation. After a meeting, the commander of the Northern Fleet, Admiral Spirin, decides to send a Tu-16 aircraft to the submarine, carrying a boat and a group of repairmen. They are to be delivered to the target by the plane of Captain Gremyachkin - Volk's second pilot. However, halfway to the target, Gremyachkin's plane encounters a strong counter-flow of air. He does not have enough fuel to complete the task. Only Volk's plane can refuel it, but then he will have almost no fuel left. In the end, Spirin orders Volk to "stand in a circle" and wait for Gremyachkin's aircraft.

Meanwhile, the commander of the American squadron, Admiral Rink, receives information that Soviet forces sent a rescuer to Turner's submarine. Americans can not allow the Soviet military to get on the submarine, but they have no legal basis to prevent this. A plane from the United States cannot fly because of the weather, and Turner is 8 hours flying time away from Greenland. Therefore, Rink makes a decision - to disrupt the rescuer's refueling.

When Volk and Gremyachkin start docking, Armstrong's plane appears next to it. Orion takes up position in front of Soviet aircraft and tries to prevent them from docking by directing turbulent jets from the engines towards them. Armstrong is sure of impunity - in neutral airspace, Soviet aircraft will not fire at him. However, Volk gives the order to prepare for precautionary shooting, and the crews manage to dock and transfer fuel. Gremyachkin's aircraft safely flies off. Volk accelerates, and nearly stalls Armstrong himself.

Gremyachkin's plane reaches the target and drops the boat with repairmen. However, Turner refuses to let them on board and orders a sailor to fire warning shots.

Meanwhile, American sailors are trying to eliminate the malfunction, but a fire begins in the reactor compartment. The voltage drops in the computer's circuits, and the weapons officer orders to turn it off. This leads to a short circuit, and the computer issues a weapon system command to fire a missile salvo at Soviet ships, the target data having been entered during the exercise. The command to prevent the launch does not work, since Alan entered permission to launch from the captain's panel. Turner does not have time to turn on the lock again and the submarine launches two missiles at the Soviet task force. Automatic reloading of weapons for a second salvo begins ...

Soviet ships detect the incoming missiles. The SAMs on the flagship aircraft carrier Kiev destroy the missiles. Yak-38 aircraft take off from Kiev in order to sink the American nuclear submarine which fired the missiles. But Admiral Rink communicates with Spirin and convinces him to postpone the attack for 10 minutes explaining that the launch of the missiles is a consequence of a malfunction, the Americans themselves will sink the submarine after the crew leaves it. Spirin agrees with the words: “If in 10 minutes they do not sink the submarine, then we will”.

The crew is evacuated from the submarine, which goes to the bottom. The missile cruiser Kirov (065th) is ordered to take on board Soviet specialists.

Meanwhile, Major Volk's aircraft runs out of fuel, in glide mode, it is approaching the coast. Skiba finds a solution - land on an old German advance airfield from the Second World War. The crew manages to do this. The plane receives minor damage, and the crew get off with light injuries.

After some time, the whole crew meets at the apartment of General Pavlov. During the evening, Pavlov's wife tells Volk's wife why he refuses to re-train on new aircraft: 8 years ago, Volk's missile carrier aircraft crashed on takeoff and caught fire. Skiba pulled Volk out of the burning plane, but was badly injured, almost missing a leg. After long-term treatment and effort from Volk, Skiba was allowed to fly, but only on auxiliary wing aircraft. However, Skiba himself this evening reports to General Pavlov about leaving to the reserve, freeing Volk from "obligations". In the epilogue, Volk takes off as the commander of a new Tu-142 anti-submarine aircraft.

== Cast ==
=== Russian characters ===
- Boris Shcherbakov as Maj. Gennady Volk
- Mihai Volontir as Capt. Sergey Skiba
- Anatoli Kuznetsov as Maj. General Pavlov
- Boris Tokarev as navigating officer Lieut. Vladimir Pavlov
- Valery Malyshev as Prap. Leonid Gudkov
- Vladimir Sedov as Admiral Spirin

=== American characters ===
- Omar Volmer as Admiral Rink
- Pauls Butkēvičs as Turner
- Vytautas Tomkus as Maj. Armstrong
- Ivars Kalniņš as Allan

== Critical reception ==
According to Tony Shaw, Professor of Contemporary History at University of Kansas, the film serves as a Soviet counterpart to Rambo: First Blood Part II. According to Robert D. English, the positive depiction of the Soviets in contrast to the Americans is an example of the methods used to shape cultural perceptions during the late Cold War.
