= Strastnoy Boulevard (film) =

1999 film

- Film poster
- Directed by: Vladimir Khotinenko
- Written by: Sergey Koltakov
- Starring: Sergey Koltakov
- Cinematography: Vladimir Shevtsik
- Production company: ROI Studio
- Release date: July 1999 (Moscow)
- Running time: 107 minutes
- Country: Russia
- Language: Russian

Strastnoy Boulevard (Russian: Страстной бульвар, romanized: Strastnoy bulvar) is a 1999 Russian drama film directed by Vladimir Khotinenko. It was entered into the 21st Moscow International Film Festival where it received a Special Mention.

== Cast ==
- Sergey Koltakov as Andrei Sokolov
- Vladimir Ilyin as Dukin
- Nina Usatova as Dukin's wife, actress dolls
- Sergey Garmash as writer
- Sergey Parshin as passenger
- Yelena Starodub as Andrei Sokolov's former wife
- Ivan Bortnik as man by the fire
