= Mikhail Tumanishvili =

Russian actor (1935–2010)

- Born: Mikhail Iosifovich Tumanishvili; 19 June 1935; Moscow, Soviet Union
- Died: 22 December 2010 (aged 75); Moscow, Russia
- Occupations: Film director, stage director
- Years active: 1957–2010

Mikhail Iosifovich Tumanishvili (Russian: Михаи́л Ио́сифович Туманишви́ли), born 19 June 1935, died 22 December 2010, was a Russian stage and film director and actor. Tumanishvili is best known of his 1980s action films Hit Back, Incident at Map Grid 36-80 and The Detached Mission, which is often referred as the Soviet Rambo.

He was born in Moscow as the son of film director Josef Tumanishvili, who was also the chief of Moscow Operetta Theatre and the Bolshoi Theatre. Tumanishvili graduated from the actors faculty of Boris Shchukin Theatre Institute and the musical direction department of Russian Academy of Theatre Arts. He worked as a stage director in Pushkin Theatre and started making films in 1981. Tumanishvili was the head director of the opening and closing ceremonies of the 1980 Summer Olympics in Moscow.

== Selected filmography ==
=== As director ===
- Hit Back (1981)
- Incident at Map Grid 36-80 (1982)
- Obstacle Сourse (1984)
- The Detached Mission (1985)
- Free Fall (1987)
- Crash – Cop's Daughter (1989)
- Wolfhound (1991)
- Stalin's Testament (1993)
- Crusader (1995)

=== As actor ===
- Leningrad Symphony (1957)
- Battle in the Way (1961)
- Life First (1961)
- Armageddon (1962)
- Crusader (1995)
