= Vladimir Ilyin (actor) =

Soviet and Russian actor

- Владимир Ильин
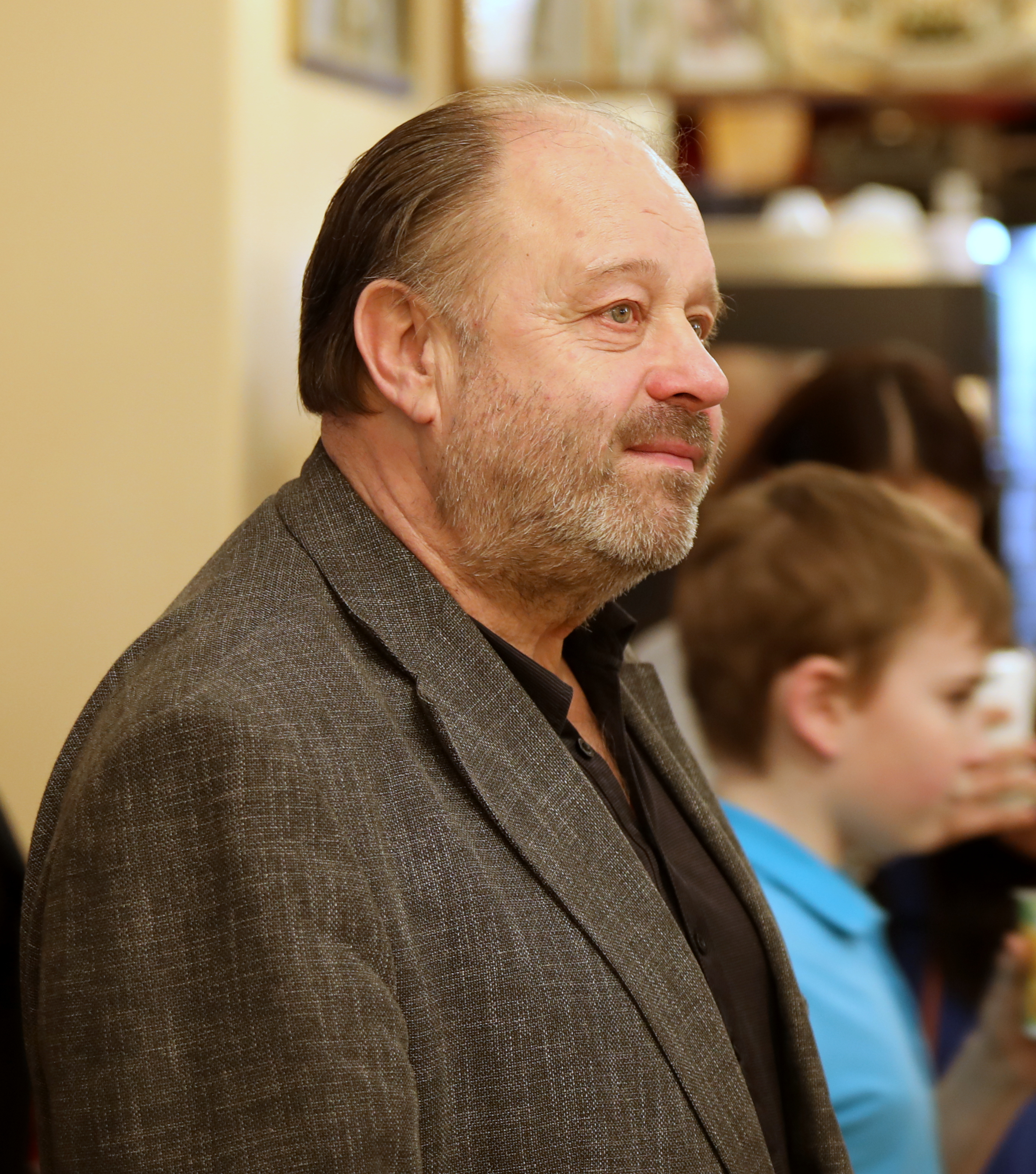
- Vladimir Ilyin in 2017
- Born: Vladimir Adolfovich Ilyin; 16 November 1947 (age 78); Sverdlovsk, Russian SFSR, Soviet Union
- Occupation: Actor
- Years active: 1969–present
- Awards: Nika Award - 1993, 1998, 2009

Vladimir Adolfovich Ilyin (Russian: Влади́мир Адо́льфович Ильи́н; born 16 November 1947) is a Soviet and Russian actor. He was awarded People's Artist of Russia in 1999.

== Early life ==
Vladimir Ilyin was born in Sverdlovsk, Russian SFSR, Soviet Union (now Yekaterinburg, Russia). In 1969, he graduated from the Sverdlovsk Theatre School (course F. Grigoryan). He worked in the theater "Buffoon" under the direction of G. Yudenich in Kazan Youth Theater. From 1974 to 1989, he worked in the theater named after Vl. Mayakovsky led by A. Goncharov.

== Personal life ==
Wife Zoe Ilyina (née Pylnova) (29.01.1947–12.01.2025). His nephew Aleksandr Ilyin Jr., is also an actor.

== Selected filmography ==
Vladimir Ilyin has starred in over 111 films

Film
Year	Title	Role	Notes
2025	Rowing for Gold	Ilich	
2025	Palma 2	Sergei Tikhonov	
2021	A Dog Named Palma	Tikhonov	
2018	Coach	Berger	
2017	The Age of Pioneers	Sergei Korolev	
2014	Poddubny	Poddubny's manager	
2013	State protection 3	Vitaliy Avdeyevich Subbota	TV series
2012	White Tiger	Colonel, Chief of Hospital	
2011	Vysotsky. Thank You For Being Alive	KGB colonel from Moscow	
2011	Burnt by the Sun 2 Citadel	Kirik	
2010	Burnt by the Sun 2 Exodus	Kirik	
2010	Ivanov	Michail Borkin	
2009	Taras Bulba	Koschevoi ataman	
2009	Ward No. 6	Andrey Ragin, doctor	
2009	Attack on Leningrad	Malinin	
2007	War and Peace	Michail Kutuzov	Mini-series
2005	The Turkish Gambit	Mizinov	
2004	Remote access	Timothy	
2003	The Idiot	Lebedev	TV series
2000	Secrets of Palace Revolutions	Andrei Osterman	TV series
2000	Fortuna	Garik	
1999	Strastnoy Boulevard	Dukin	
1998	The Barber of Siberia	Captain Mokin	
1998	Stringer	Peter Jaworskiy	
1998	I Want to Go to Prison	Semyon Semyonych Lyamkin	
1998	Day of the Full Moon	Rebrov, saxophonist	
1996-97	Queen Margo	La Yurer	TV series
1995	Black veil	Yakov Ratisov	
1995	Single player	Misha	
1995	Arrival of a train		
1995	A Moslem	Genashka, shepherd	
1994	Burnt by the Sun	Kirik	
1994	The Life and Extraordinary Adventures of Private Ivan Chonkin	collective farm chairman Golubev	
1993	Fatal Deception: Mrs. Lee Harvey Oswald	Uncle	Television film
1993	Sagittarius restless	German Andreevich	
1993	Makarov	Vasily Cvetaev	
1992	White King, Red Queen	Zolin	
1992	Encore, Once More Encore!	Lihovol, intendant	
1991	Wolfhound	cashier	
1991	Lost in Siberia	captain Victor Malakhov	
1990	Sons of Bitches	Leva Busygin	
1990	A cap	Fima Rachlin	
1990	Roy	fool Artyusha	
1989	Crash – Cop's Daughter	Alexey Nikolaev, father of Valerie	
1988	Guessing on the ram's shoulder	Khomich	
1988	Defender Sedov	Vladimir Sedov	
1987	Time to fly	Andrey Konstantinovich	
1986	My favorite clown	Roman Romanovsky	
1969	Sons go into battle	episode	
1969	Zhenya, Zhenechka and Katyusha	soldier	
