= Glinjeni, Fălești =

Glinjeni
- Village
- Location within Moldova
- Coordinates: 47.5983333333°N 27.8883333333°E
- Country: Moldova
- District: Fălești District

Government
  - Mayor: Zarija Viorel (Our Party)

Population (2014 census)
  - Total: 3,210
- Time zone: UTC+2 (EET)
  - Summer (DST): UTC+3 (EEST)

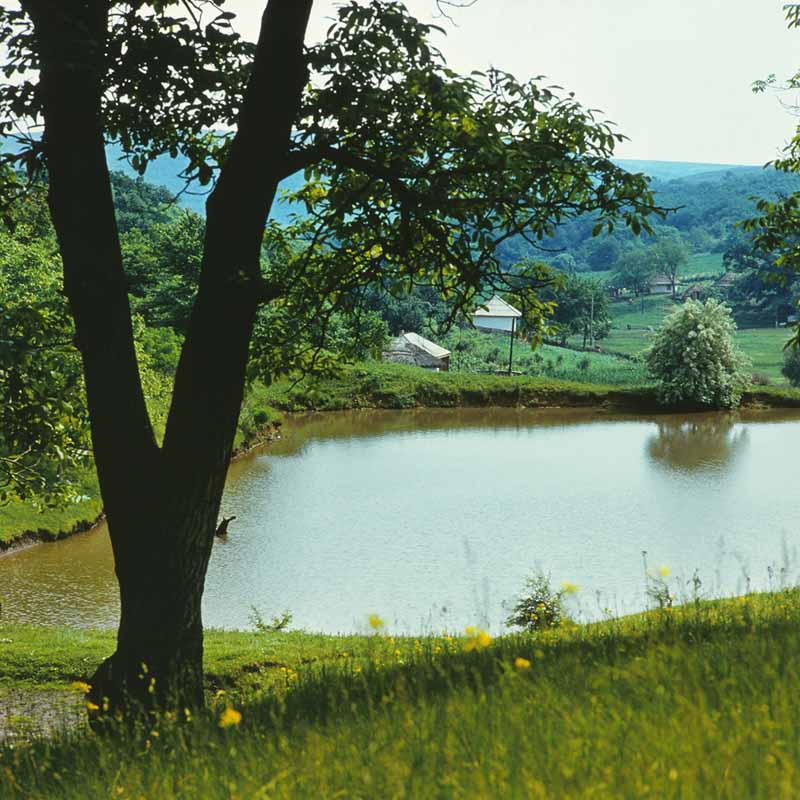
Glinjeni village

Glinjeni is a village in Fălești District, Moldova. It is one the biggest villages in the Fălești District. After the death of Piotr Gafinciuc on 08.11.2022, special elections were called, Zarija Viorel from Our Party being elected as the new Mayor, being reelected on 05.11.2023.

== History ==
The village of Glinjeni was formed between four hills, as it was a place sheltered from strong winds and rains. The first families were: Țurcanu, Marcoci, Corlăteanu, and Cibotaru.

The village of Glinjeni belonged to the estate of the “St. Catherine” monastery on Mount “Sinai” (1668), paying an annual tribute of 1000 sheep, 1000 hives, and 500 piglets to this monastery.

The village is located in the Ciulucul Chișcărenilor Valley, and was part of the Chișcăreni volost. It was a village with 348 houses and 2987 inhabitants, a church with the Dormition dedication, and a Russian elementary school. Founded in 1668 in a hilly region.

By 1902, there were 800 houses with a population of 4225 inhabitants (2079 men and 2146 women). For comparison, one hundred years later, the demographic aspect presents as follows: 3438 inhabitants (1666 men and 1772 women), with the vast majority being declared Moldovans, according to the census form (3398), and 23 Romanians.

Stalinist repressions affected the village in 1941 when Timofei Lazarchevici was included in the list of people to be deported simply because he had been a Romanian state official, namely the head of the local post. That year, the village was also known for the presence of the following merchants: Audșe Sașpar – tavern and grocery owner, Vladimir Jitariuc and Gheorghe Dombrovschi, Ioan Bălțatu – butcher, and Ilie Cazacu – grocer.

== Administration and Politics ==
Composition of the Glinjeni Local Council (13 councilors), elected at November 5, 2023, is the following:

Party	Councilors	Composition
Our Party	8	
Party of Action and Solidarity	3	
Party of Socialists of the Republic of Moldova	1	
Dignity and Truth Platform	1	

=== Elections ===
Summary of 2025 Parliament of Moldova election results in Glinjeni, Fălești
Parties and coalitions		Votes	%
	Party of Action and Solidarity (PAS)	449	38.98
	Our Party (PN)	441	38.28
	Patriotic Electoral Bloc (BEP)	123	10.68
	Democracy at Home Party (PPDA)	55	4.77
	Alternative Electoral Bloc (BEA)	21	1.82
	European Social Democratic Party (PSDE)	13	1.13
	Andrei Năstase	12	1.04
	Coalition for Unity and Welfare (CUB)	7	0.61
	Respect Moldova Movement	6	0.52
	League of Cities and Communes	5	0.43
	New Historical Option	4	0.35
	ALDE	3	0.26
	National Moldovan Party	2	0.17
	Olesea Stamate	2	0.17
	Victoria Sanduța	2	0.17
	Christian-Social Union of Moldova	2	0.17
Total	1,155		100.00
