= Zirgan =

Zirgan Зирган Ергән
- Selo
- Location within Bashkortostan Location within Russia
- Coordinates: 53°13′N 55°55′E
- Country: Russia
- Region: Bashkortostan
- District: Meleuzovsky District
- Time zone: UTC+5:00

Zirgan (Russian: Зирган; Bashkir: Ергән, Yergän) is a rural locality (a selo) and the administrative centre of Zirgansky Selsoviet, Meleuzovsky District, Bashkortostan, Russia. The population was 4,125 as of 2010. There are 35 streets.

== Geography ==
Zirgan is located 33 km north of Meleuz (the district's administrative centre) by road. Sabashevo is the nearest rural locality.
