= Swarm Development Group =

American non-profit organization

The Swarm Development Group (SDG) is an American non-profit organization to advance the development of complex adaptive system-oriented agent-based modeling (ABM) tools initiated at the Santa Fe Institute (SFI) in Santa Fe, New Mexico, US.

== History ==
Swarm Development Group was formed in 1999 by a group of multidisciplinary scientists, researchers, and software developers, led by Chris Langton. Langton was also the founder of the emerging field of research called artificial life. The initial, primary, role for the SDG was to house continued development of the Swarm simulation software after the software become independent of the SFI in 1999.

The role of the Swarm Development Group has expanded to include the co-ordination of a long-running conference SwarmFest during May, June, or July each summer – typically hosted by a different research university each year. Developers, users, and researchers gather to present research papers and discuss the state of Swarm and other agent-based modeling platforms like RePast (University of Chicago) and Ascape (Brookings). Typically, a wide range of academic, corporate, and government organizations are represented at SwarmFest. The first SwarmFest was in 1998 while Swarm was still sponsored by the Santa Fe Institute. From SwarmFest 2000 onwards, after the SDG was formed in late 1999, SwarmFests were organized directly by the SDG.

Recent SwarmFests have been held at a variety of institutions. SwarmFest 2007 was held at DePaul University's School of Computer Science, Telecommunications, and Information Systems, in Chicago. SwarmFest 2008 was held at Northwestern Memorial Hospital/Northwestern University Feinberg School of Medicine, in Chicago. Swarmfest 2008 had special focus areas on agent based modeling in Systems Biology, and the implementation of agent based models in high-performance computing environments. Between 2009 and 2012, SwarmFest was held at the Santa Fe Complex in Santa Fe, New Mexico. Swarmfest 2013 was held at the University of Central Florida in Orlando, Florida July 8–9.; SwarmFest 2014 was held at the University of Notre Dame in Notre Dame, Indiana from June 29 – July 1, 2014; the University of South Carolina in Columbia, South Carolina (in 2015), the University of Vermont in Burlington, Vermont (in 2016), and Old Dominion University in Suffolk, Virginia (in 2017), were the selected venues.
