= Swarm (simulation) =

- Developer(s): Swarm Development Group
- Initial release: November 1997; 27 years ago
- Stable release: 2.4.1 / April 2009; 15 years ago
- Written in: Objective-C, Java
- Operating system: Unix-like, Microsoft Windows
- Type: Scientific software
- License: GNU General Public License
- Website: www.swarm.org
- As of: October 2013

Swarm is an open-source agent-based modeling simulation package, useful for simulating the interaction of agents (social or biological) and their emergent collective behavior. Swarm was initially developed at the Santa Fe Institute in the mid-1990s, and since 1999 has been maintained by the non-profit Swarm Development Group. Also known as the Swarm Simulation System, it is available for free and use, covered by the GNU General Public License.

Early development work on Swarm was completed by Chris Langton (SFI), Roger Burkhart (John Deere), Nelson Minar (SFI), Manor Askenazi (SFI), Glen Ropella (SFI), Marcus Daniels (SFI), and Alex Lancaster (SFI). Since that time, many hundreds of people around the world have contributed to the continued open source development of the suite of Swarm ABM tools.

== Applications ==
=== Scientific applications ===
Agent-based modeling seeks to replicate these complexities and adaptations in computational environments where these interactive emergent behaviors can be analyzed multi-dimensionally. By defining and assigning agencies reflective of prescribed behaviors, known or estimated, to active software agents in a computer simulation, scientists can approximate experimental results not possible in natural temporal frameworks.

Swarm and other agent-based modeling platforms afford scientists the opportunity to conduct and visualize experiments in these synthetic macro and microenvironments for testing scientific theories, natural data sets, and other analyses while free of pressing constraints like time, volume, hazards, or many other parameters.

=== Commercial applications ===
Agent-based models have been used since the mid-1990s to solve a variety of business and technology problems. Examples of applications include:

- supply chain optimization and logistics;
- modeling of consumer behavior, including word of mouth and social network effects;
- distributed computing;
- workforce management;
- traffic management; and
- portfolio management.

In these and other applications, the system of interest is simulated by capturing the behavior of individual agents and their interconnections. Agent-based modeling tools can be used to test how changes in individual behaviors will affect the overall, emergent system behavior.

== See also ==
- Agent-based social simulation
- Repast
- NetLogo
- Sugarscape
- GAMA
