= Vladimir Khotinenko =

Russian actor, film director and designer

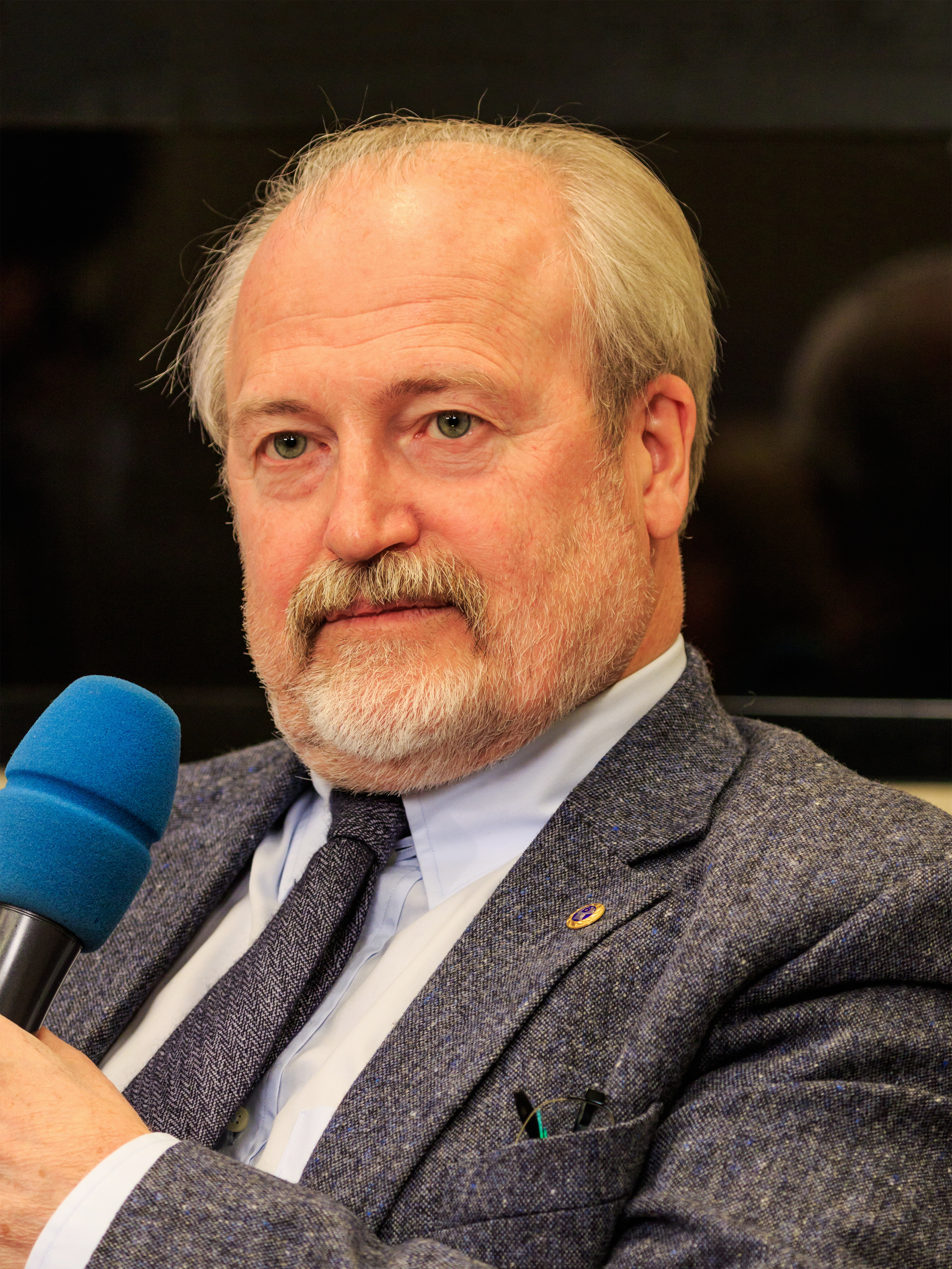
- Born: Vladimir Ivanovich Khotinenko; 20 January 1952 (age 74); Slavgorod, Altai Krai, USSR
- Education: Ural State Academy of Architecture and Arts
- Occupations: actor, film director, designer
- Years active: 1979–present
- Spouse: Tatyana Yakovleva

Vladimir Ivanovich Khotinenko (Russian: Владимир Иванович Хотиненко; born 20 January 1952 in Slavgorod, Altai Krai, Soviet Union) is a Russian actor, film director and designer.

== Biography ==
Born in the Altai Krai, Russian SFSR to Ivan Afanasyevich and Valentina Vasilievna Khotinenko. His father was Ukrainian, his mother came from Don Cossacks. In 1976, he received his diploma from the Ural State Academy of Architecture and Arts, in what is now Yekaterinburg. After his military service, he was from 1978 to 1982, assistant designer at Studio-Film in Sverdlovsk, and was assistant director for the film by Nikita Mikhalkov, A Few Days from the Life of I. I. Oblomov. He collaborated on other films by Mikhalkov in Moscow, such as Five Nights (Пять вечеров) 1979, and Family Relations (Родня) 1981.

He then became director of the Gerasimov Institute of Cinematography in Moscow. His 1999 film Strastnoy Boulevard was entered into the 21st Moscow International Film Festival where it won a Special Mention.

He excelled in historical films and large scenes, particularly describing the history of Russia. He won the Golden Eagle in 2004 for 72 Metres.

In March 2014 he signed a letter in support of Vladimir Putin's policies regarding the 2014 Russian annexation of Crimea and Ukraine.

== Filmography ==
Actor:

- 1981 Family Relations
- 1982 Kazachya zastava
- 1988 The Soloist
- 1994 A Plane Flies in Russia
- 2005 The Fall of the Empire (TV)

Director:

- 1984 Alone and Unarmed
- 1987 Mirror for a Hero
- 1990 The Swarm
- 1992 Patriotic Comedy
- 1993 Makarov
- 1995 A Moslem
- 1999 Strastnoy bulvar (producer)
- 2002 Po tu storonu volkov
- 2003 Sledstvie vedut znatoki 23: Treteyskiy sudiya
- 2004 72 Meters
- 2004 The Fall of the Empire (screenwriter)
- 2007 1612
- 2009 The Priest
- 2011 Dostoyevsky (TV series)
- 2014 Demons
- 2019 The Lenin Factor
