= Mama Don't Cry =

- DVD cover
- Directed by: Maksim Pezhemsky
- Written by: Konstantin Murzenko; Maksim Pezhemsky
- Produced by: Sergei Selyanov; Sergei Chliyants
- Starring: Gosha Kutsenko; Yevgeni Sidikhin; Nikolai Chindyajkin; Andrei Panin; Valeriy Priyomykhov
- Cinematography: Andrei Zhegalov
- Edited by: Marina Lipartiya
- Music by: Valeriy Alakhov; Oskar Strok
- Release date: 1998
- Running time: 83 minutes
- Country: Russia
- Language: Russian

Mama Don't Cry or Mama Don't Grieve (Russian: Мама, не горюй, romanized: Mama Ne Goryuj) is a 1998 comedy gangster film.

The stars of the film include famous Russian actors such as Gosha Kutsenko, Andrey Panin, Yevgeni Sidikhin, Nikolai Chindyajkin, Valeriy Priyomykhov, and Ivan Bortnik. Directed by Maksim Pezhemsky.

== Synopsis ==
A sailor attending a wedding assaults a stranger who begins taking liberties with the bride. Unfortunately for the sailor, the stranger is the head of the local mafia. When a contract is placed on his head the sailor finds that many people are now very interested in him.
