= Kamuflirovannyi Letnyi Maskirovochnyi Kombinezon =

Soviet-made green digital camouflage

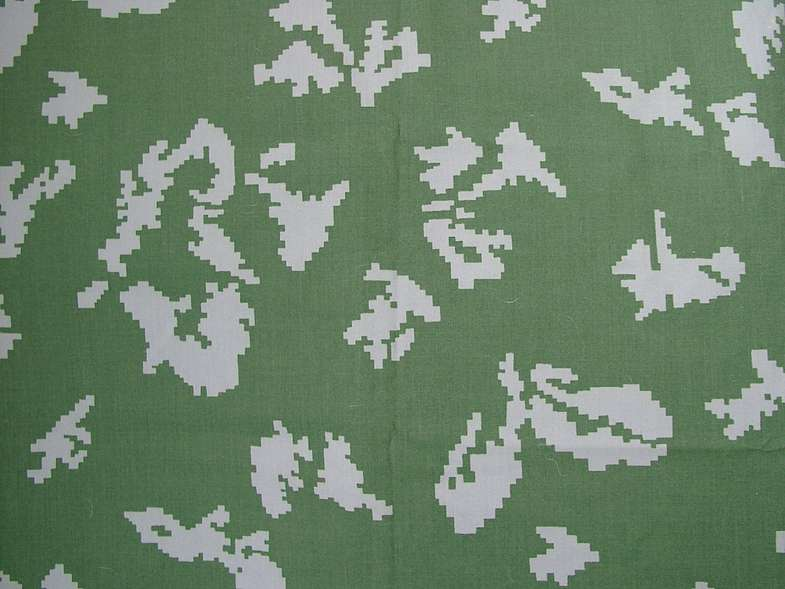
- Type: Military camouflage pattern
- Place of origin: Soviet Union

Service history
- In service: 1968–present
- Used by: see § Users
- Wars: Soviet–Afghan War; Afghan Civil War; First Nagorno-Karabakh War; Russo-Georgian War; War in Donbas; Transnistria war; Second Nagorno-Karabakh War; Russo-Ukrainian War; War in Donbas

Production history
- Designed: 1968
- Produced: 1968–present
- Variants: see § Variants

The Kamuflirovannyy Letniy Maskirovochnyy Kombinezon (Russian: Камуфлированный Летний Маскировочный Комбинезон, lit. 'Camouflaged Summer Disguise Coverall') or KLMK is a military uniform with a camouflage pattern developed in 1968 by the Soviet Union to overcome the widespread use of night vision optics and devices by NATO countries. This one-piece camouflage coverall became one of the most widely used in the Soviet Union.

In 2018, the KLMK two piece camouflage suit was still in production. The pattern is sometimes known as the Berezka.

== History ==
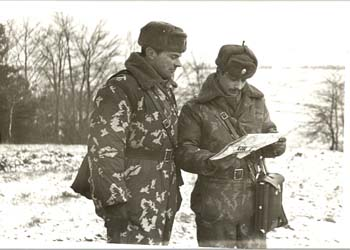
KGB Border Guards wearing KLMK uniforms.

The KLMK was issued to KGB Border Guards in service dress uniforms. It was later seen with their forces sent to Afghanistan during the Soviet–Afghan War.

== Description and versions ==
Birch camouflage is 2-color design and consists of light angular ("toothed") spots in the shape of leaves on a green-olive background. The standard camouflage pattern exists in two color versions: with spots of light gray color; with spots of yellow-sand color (this version was used mainly by KGB border guards). The background color of both variants is olive, sometimes there are swamp-colored specimens. In any case, the background in this color scheme is always darker than the spots. The spots themselves have "angular" edges consisting of many small squares. The KLMK is made with a digitalized spatter-like pattern.

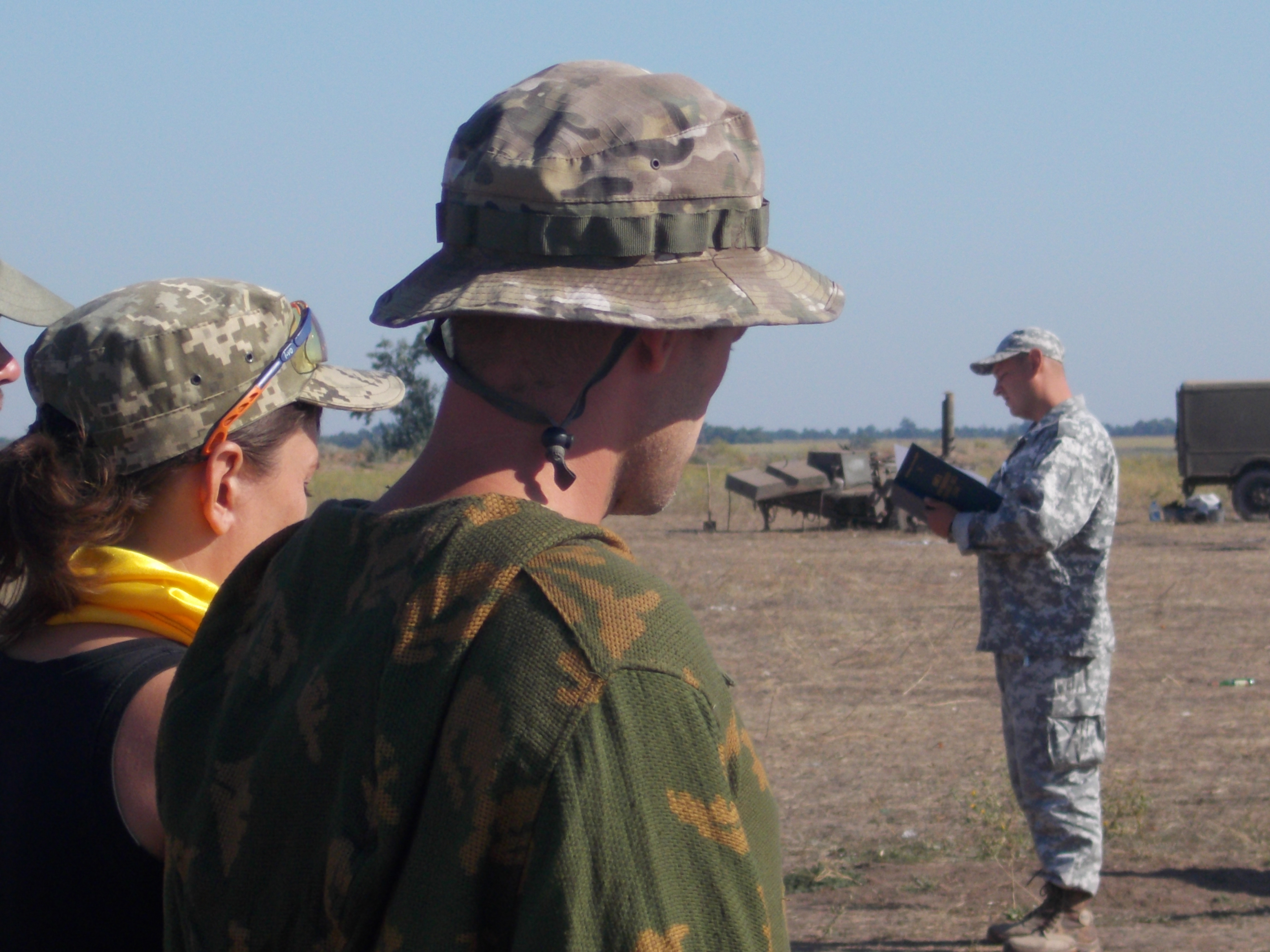
Closeup of KZS showing burlap-like fabric.

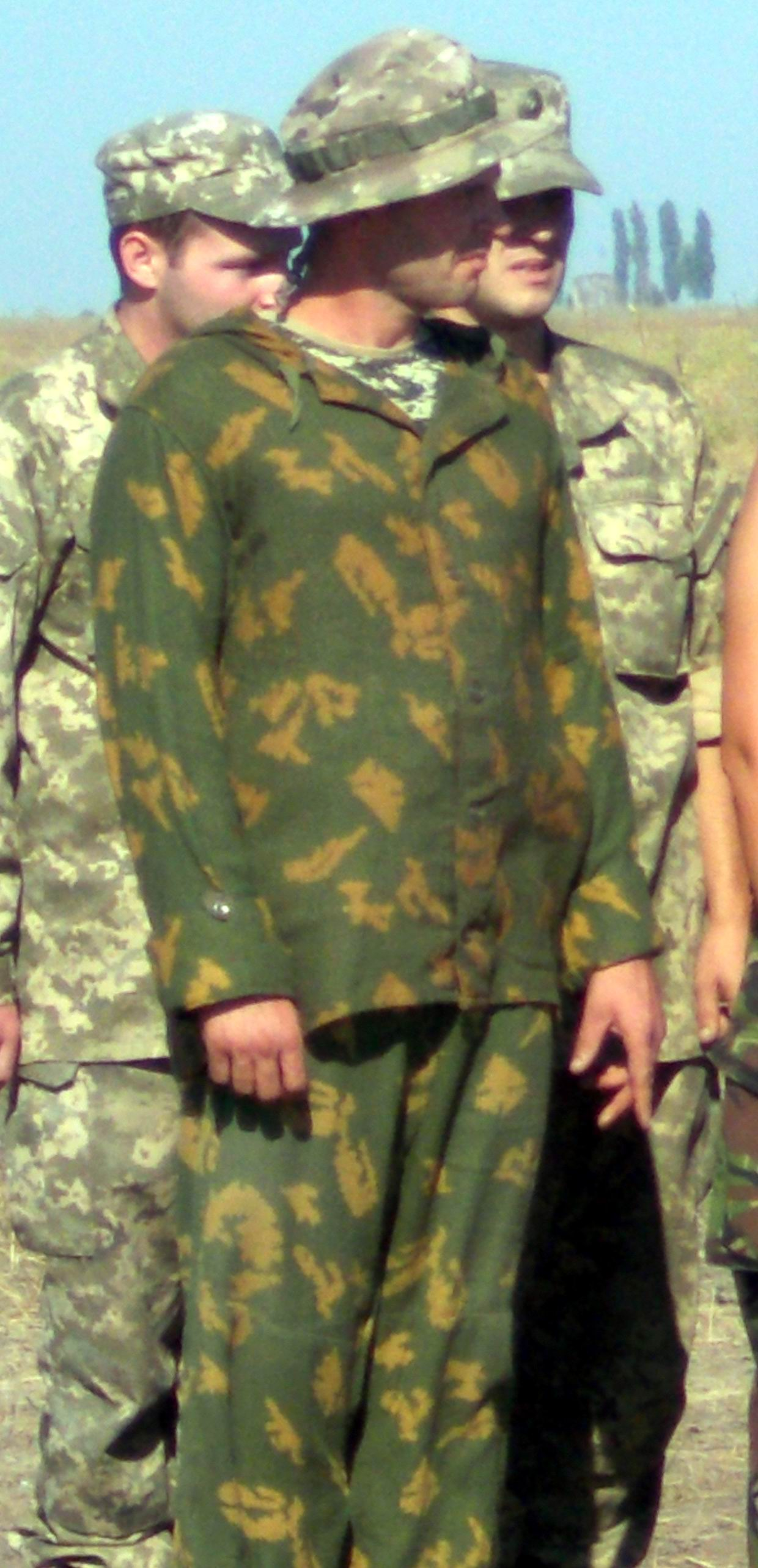
Yellow variant worn by Ukrainian soldier.

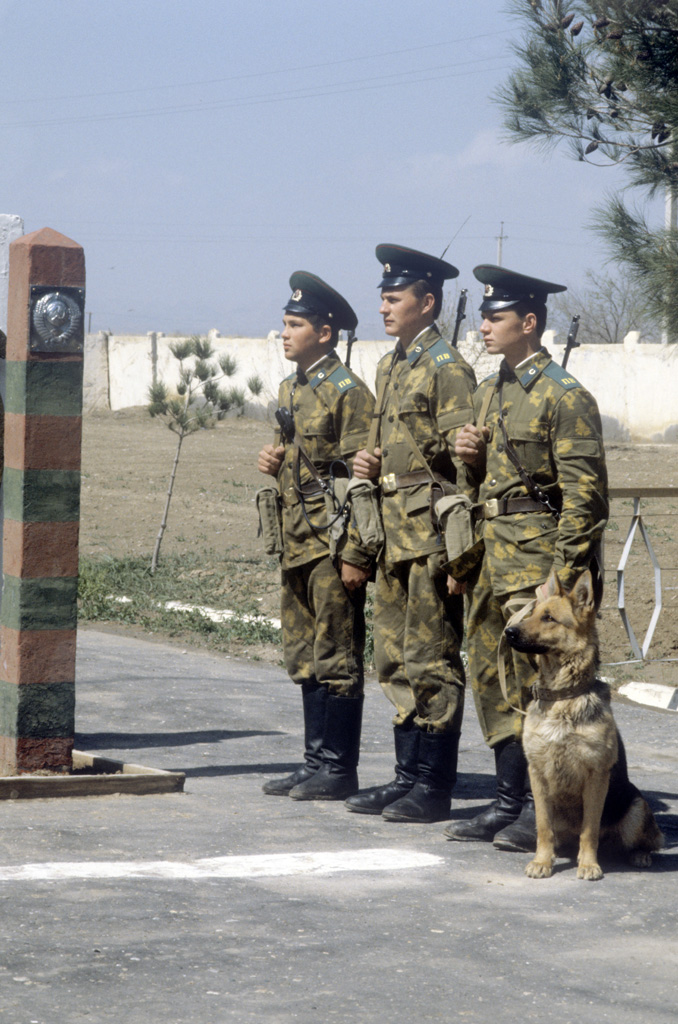
Yellow variant worn by KGB Border Troops.

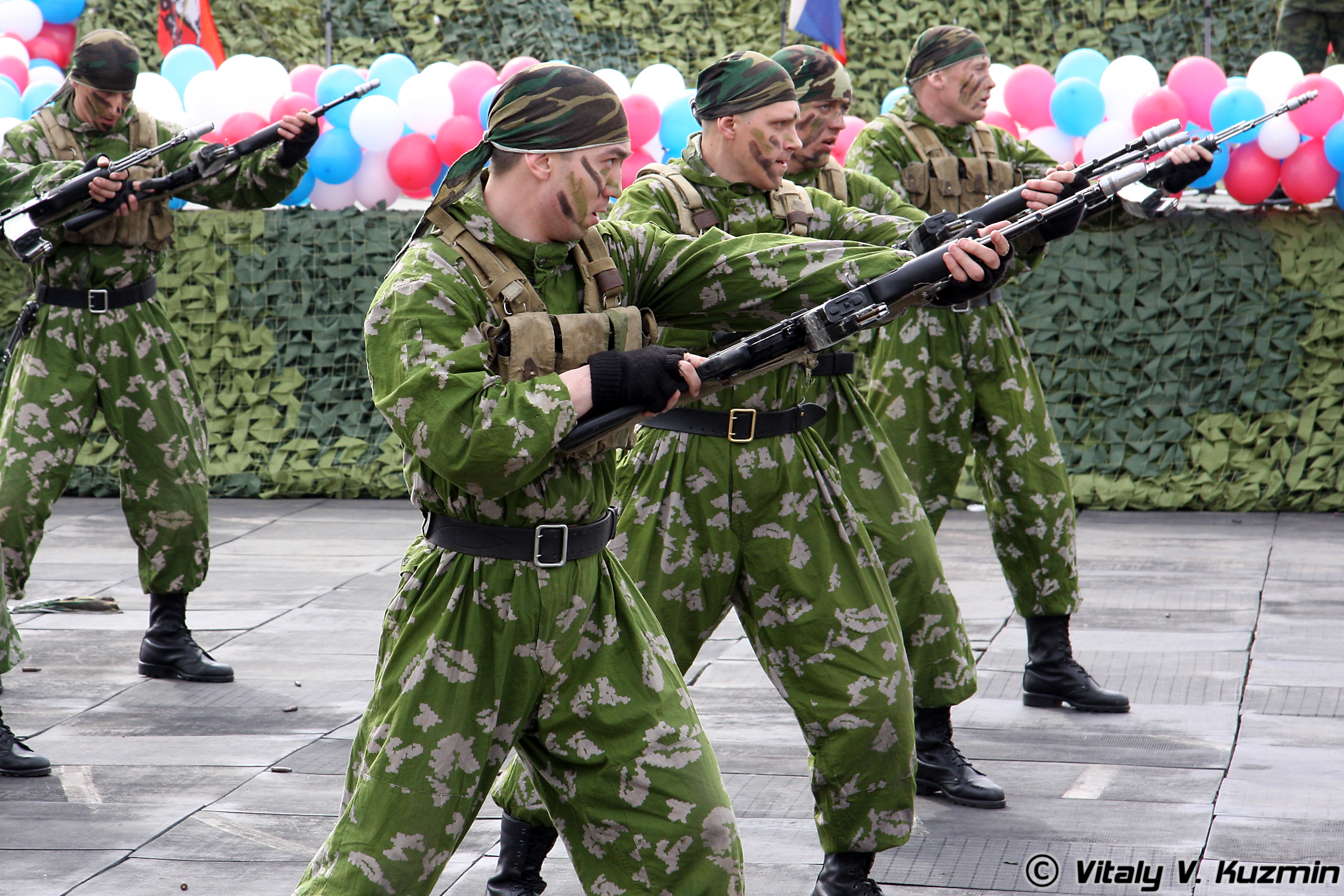
White KLMK worn by soldiers of Russian 27th Independent Sevastopol Guards Motor Rifle Brigade.

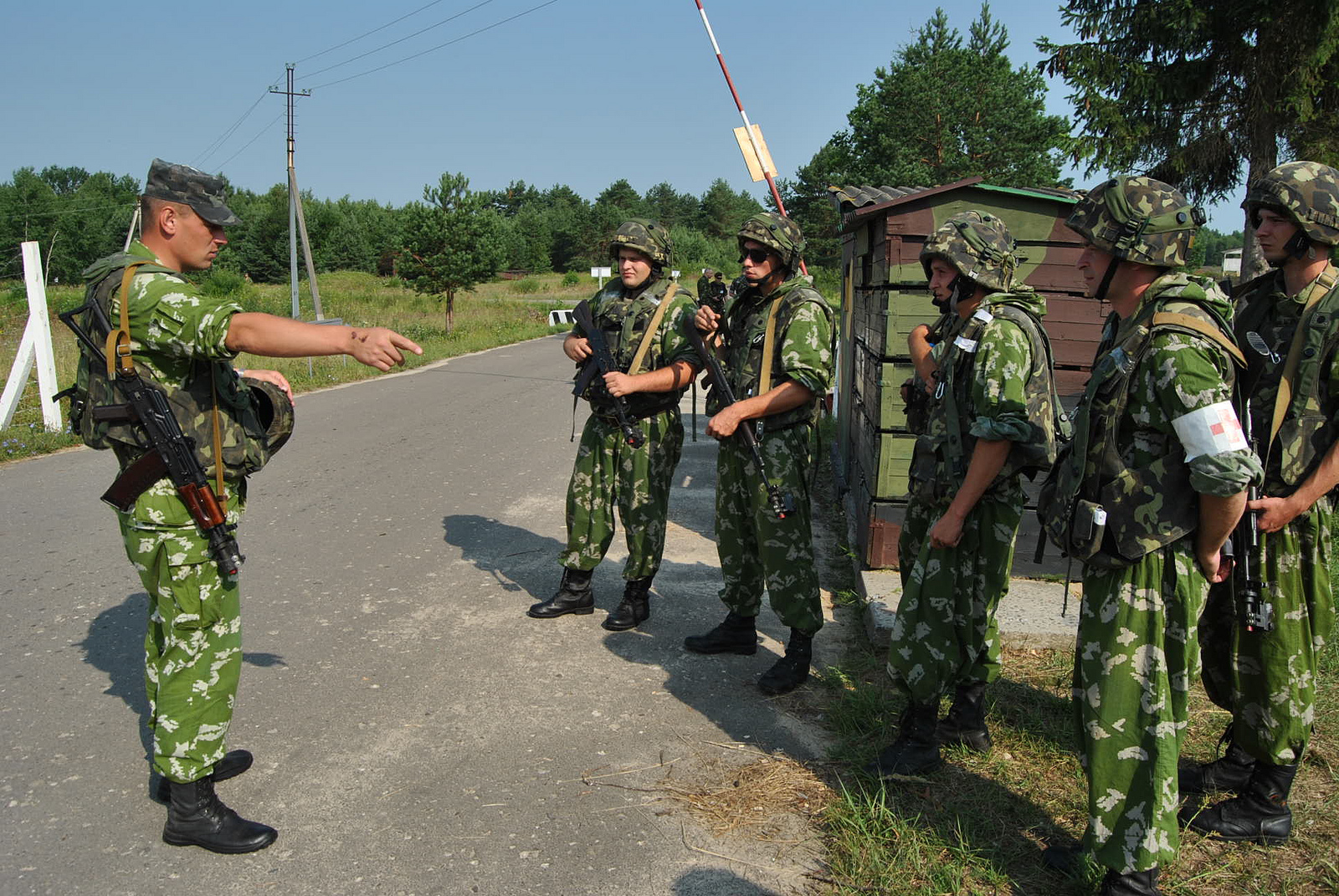
White KMLK wearing Ukrainian officer briefing white KLMK wearing Ukrainian troops during exercise Rapid Trident 2013.

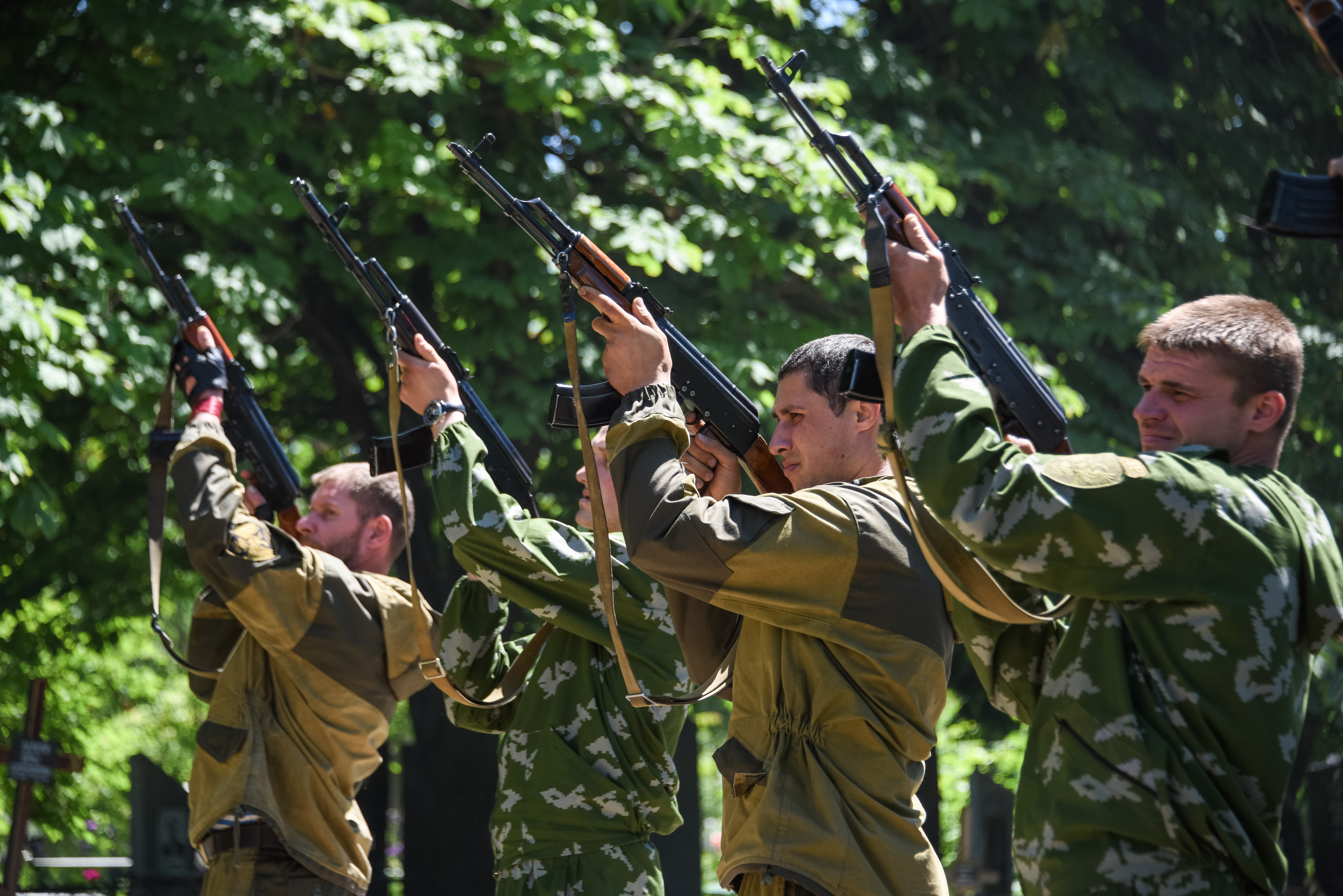
Pro-Russian rebels wearing white KLMK uniforms.

== Variants ==
=== KZS Suit ===
The KZS (Russian: костюм защитный сетчатый or kostium zashchitnoi seti 'protective net suit') is a two-piece camouflage suit, designed for use by chemical troops. Made of coarse loose weave cotton fabric (possibly burlap). It was first issued to Soviet chemical troops in 1975 and was later widely used by troops from all combat arms, especially during the Afghan war.

The KZS was made to be disposable once used in a chemical environment it cannot be used any longer.

It is also known as the Berezka ('birch'), Color 57, Serebryanyj List ('silver leaf'), or Spetsodezhda ('special purpose clothing')

== Users ==
- Armenia
- Azerbaijan
- Belarus: KLMK and KZS-type camos used by Belarusian special forces. KZS camos used by Belarusian border guard forces in public appearances.
- Russia: KZS used by Spetsnaz and VDV plus Engineer & Cossack units of the Russian Army.
- Tajikistan: Berezhka-based patterns used by Tajik Border Guard.

=== Former ===
- Democratic Republic of Afghanistan: Used by the DRA Army.
- Afghanistan
- Republic of Belarus (1991–1995)
- Russia (flag 1991-1993)
- Soviet Union: Known to be used by the KGB Border Guards and the VDV.
- Ukraine: Seen with KLMK pattern-based camos.

=== Partially-recognized states ===
- Luhansk People's Republic
- South Ossetia: Used by pro-Russian irregulars during the 2008 Russian-Georgian War.

== In popular culture ==
A clone of the KLMK was made for the films Red Dawn and Rambo 3.
