= Glinjeni, Șoldănești =

Glinjeni
- Village
- Location within Moldova
- Country: Moldova
- District: Șoldănești District

Government
  - Mayor: Vasile Bîrcă (PDM)

Population (2014 census)
  - Total: 842
- Time zone: UTC+2 (EET)
  - Summer (DST): UTC+3 (EEST)

Glinjeni is a village in Șoldănești District, Moldova.
