= List of Soviet films of 1978 =

== 1978 ==
Title	Original title	Director	Cast	Genre	Notes
1978
31 June	31 июня	Leonid Kvinikhidze	Nikolai Yeryomenko M., Natalya Trubnikova, Vladimir Zeldin, Vladimir Etush, Lyubov Polishchuk	Musical, Fantasy	
Asya	Ася	Iosif Kheifits	Elena Koreneva	Drama	Soviet-East German co-production
Balamut	Баламут	Vladimir Rogovoy	Vadim Andreev	Comedy	
Catch the Wind	Ищи ветра…	Vladimir Lyubomudrov	Konstantin Grígoryev	Drama	
Centaurs	Кентавры	Vytautas Žalakevičius	Donatas Banionis, Regimantas Adomaitis	Drama	
Citizen Nikanorova Waits for You	Вас ожидает гражданка Никанорова	Leonid Maryagin	Natalya Gundareva	Comedy	
D'Artagnan and Three Musketeers	Д'Артаньян и три мушкетёра	Georgi Yungvald-Khilkevich	Mikhail Boyarsky, Veniamin Smekhov, Igor Starygin, Valentin Smirnitsky	Adventure, musical	
Dawns Are Kissing	Целуются зори	Sergey Nikonenko	Boris Saburov	Comedy	
The Dog in the Manger	Собака на сене	Yan Frid	Margarita Terekhova, Mikhail Boyarsky, Igor Dmitriev	Musical, comedy	
A Dog walked along the Piano	Шла собака по роялю	Vladimir Grammatikov	Alyona Kishchik	Comedy	
Errors of Youth	Ошибки юности	Boris Frumin	Nina Arkhipova, Nikolai Karachentsov, Marina Neyolova, Nikolai Penkov, Natalya Varley, Mikhail Vaskov	Drama	Screened at the 1989 Cannes Film Festival
A Fantastic Tale	Чудеса в решете	Andrei Khrzhanovsky		Animation	
Father Sergius	Отец Сергий	Igor Talankin	Sergei Bondarchuk, Valentina Titova	Drama	
Five Evenings	Пять вечеров	Nikita Mikhalkov	Stanislav Lyubshin	Drama	
Getting to Know the Big, Wide World	Познавая белый свет	Kira Muratova	Nina Ruslanova	Drama	
A Hunting Accident	Мой ласковый и нежный зверь	Emil Loteanu	Galina Belyayeva, Oleg Yankovskiy, Kirill Lavrov, Leonid Markov, Svetlana Toma, Grigore Grigoriu	Romantic Drama	Soviet-West German co-production; Entered into the 1978 Cannes Film Festival
In the Zone of Special Attention	В зоне особого внимания	Andrei Malyukov	Boris Galkin, Mihai Volontir, Anatoly Kuznetsov	Action	
The Lonely Voice of Man	Одинокий голос человека	Alexander Sokurov	Tatyana Goryacheva	Drama	
Lone Wolf	Бирюк	Roman Balayan	Mikhail Golubovich	Drama	Entered into the 28th Berlin International Film Festival
The New Adventures of Captain Wrongel	Новые приключения капитана Врунгеля	Gennady Vasilyev	Mikhail Pugovkin	Musical	
Old Fashioned Comedy	Старомодная комедия	Era Savelyeva, Tatyana Berezantseva	Alisa Freindlich	Melodrama	
Pugachev	Емельян Пугачёв	Aleksei Saltykov	Yevgeny Matveyev, Vija Artmane, Pyotr Glebov, Grigore Grigoriu, Viktor Pavlov, Tamara Syomina	Biopic	All-Union Film Festival Special Prize for Historical Film
School Waltz	Школьный вальс	Pavel Lyubimov	Elena Tsyplakova, Sergey Nasibov, Yury Solomin	Drama	
Stowaway	Безбилетная пассажирка	Yuri Pobedonostsev	Tatyana Dogileva	Comedy	
Summer Trip to the Sea	Летняя поездка к морю	Semyon Aranovich	Igor Fokin	Drama	
The Tavern on Pyatnitskaya	Трактир на Пятницкой	Aleksandr Faintsimmer	Gennadiy Korolkov, Tamara Syomina, Konstantin Grigoriev, Lev Prygunov, Nikolai Eremenko, Aleksandr Galibin	Crime drama	
Territory	Территория	Aleksander Surin	Donatas Banionis, Vladimir Letenkov	Adventure	
The Turning Point	Поворот	Vadim Abdrashitov	Oleg Yankovsky	Drama	
Where were you, Odysseus?	Где ты был, Одиссей?	Timur Zoloyev	Donatas Banionis, Anatoli Romashin	War	
The Wind of Travel	Ветер странствий	Yuri Yegorov	Galina Astakhova	Drama	
The Woman who Sings	Женщина, которая поёт	Aleksandr Orlov	Alla Pugacheva, Alla Budnitskaya	Musical	
Young Wife	Молодая жена	Leonid Menaker	Anna Kamenkova	Drama	

== See also ==
- 1978 in the Soviet Union
