= Conversation at the Television Set =

1977 song by Vladimir Vysotsky

"Conversation at the television set"

Song by Vladimir Vysotsky

from the album Tight rope
- Language: Russian
- Released: 1977
- Recorded: 1977
- Genre: Bard
- Label: Polydor Records
- Songwriter: Vladimir Vysotsky

"Conversation at the Television Set" (Russian: Диалог у телевизора) (Note: Also known as Family Circus, Conversation, Conversation in the Circus, Conversation in the Circus, or Conversation at the TV set, Conversation at the Circus, or At the TV set at home, Conversation at the TV set, Conversation at the TV set, or Conversation at the Circus, Sketch, Family Picture, or Conversation at the TV set, Incident at the Circus.) is a song written by Vladimir Vysotsky in 1972–1973. The first known performance of the song by the author occurred in January 1973 at concerts in Leningrad. The poem was published in Russian during the poet's lifetime in 1977 in Paris as part of a collection of poems called Songs of Russian Bards. In the fall of that year, the song was released in France on a record called La corde raide. In 1979, the text of Conversation and other poems by Vysotsky were included in the uncensored anthology of poetry and prose by twenty-three famous writers, the almanac Metropol (compiled by Vasily Aksyonov, Andrei Bitov, and others). The publication of this almanac in the United States led to attacks and persecution of its compilers and participants. In the USSR, the song was published after the poet's death, in 1981, in the collection of poems Nerv, and in 1990 it was included in the Melodiya record Delayed Drop (Затяжной прыжок).

Conversation at the Television Set is a song piece for two characters. The characters, Vanya and Zina, have a conversation in front of the TV. In the conversation, they talk about everyday life and a circus show. The song captures the atmosphere of everyday life in the USSR in the 1970s. It contains recognizable symbols and details that reflect the public mood in the USSR during the second half of the 20th century. Researchers include the work in various poetic cycles of Vysotsky and find in it the influence of both comic couplets popular in the 1950s and short stories by Mikhail Zoshchenko. Over time, the song's characters have become like winged expressions and have been added to modern collections of short, pithy sayings.

== Plot and characters ==
Art historian Natalia Rubinstein says that Vladimir Vysotsky's song is a kind of "play with a developed mise-en-scène," which means it has elaborate scenery and two characters. The song's plot is based on their Conversation, which covers very different topics. One topic is related to the world of the circus and its performers, while the other is more down-to-earth and focuses on domestic and industrial topics. The couple, Vanya and Zina, are from the town. She works in a factory that makes clothes, and he works in a government office. He spends his days "tumbling around" solving problems, but he's not a regular worker. The hero usually relieves the accumulated fatigue and tension "through the store". His evenings at home follow a set pattern: "Eat and then go straight to the sofa".

Sitting in front of the TV, Vanya's wife compares the bright, festive atmosphere of the arena with her own life. She realizes that the glitter and beauty of circus is very different from her own life. Zina, who started the conversation, talks about what she has seen and brings up important issues to discuss. Vanya, who has to deal with these conversations, reacts to his wife's comments with jokes, tiredness, or anger. She always starts by suggesting that he look at the screen:

"Oh, Vanya! Look, what clowns!". After reacting emotionally to the performance, the heroine automatically switches to family matters: "And you, by God, Vanya, / Well, all your friends are such trash." Vanya's attempts at defending himself are awkward. He tries to make his friends' drinking habits seem noble ("But they don't take from the family"), reminds his wife of her past ("And you yourself, Zin, / You had a friend from the tire factory..."), (Note: Tire Plant — Moscow Tire Plant is the oldest Russian enterprise for the production of automobile tires.) and asks questions that make himself look innocent ("Who wrote the complaints to my management? / Not you? I did read them!").

The television set plays an important role in the play. For the actors, it's a tool for their performance, but it also serves as a "window to the world", where life appears almost perfect. Although the real world and the imaginary world don't intersect, the characters sometimes mix them up in their minds. For example, Zina starts to imagine what it would be like to be a circus performer "in a short T-shirt". (Note: Short T-shirt — Vysotsky explained in one of his speeches that this was how he named the miniskirt.) But her husband quickly shuts down her fantasy. "Besides, this T-shirt, Zina, / You put it on, you'll be shamed, / You'll need an arshin of sewing — / Where's the money, Zin?" At the same time, the simple words and expressions included in the song ("hobbled gasoline," "get away," "you gonna offend me") do not seem overly expressive in the context of the Conversation. They sound organic because they are part of the familiar, everyday language of the characters. While watching the TV program, they manage to discuss a lot of relevant topics, but the overall outcome of the conversation is considered by researchers as a "communicative failure". The couple has a lot to say to each other, but they don't try to agree with each other. In fact, their conversation is like "a conversation of two 'deaf' people". The characters in the song communicate without the author's intervention, yet the song maintains the "bitter humor" characteristic of Vysotsky's depictions of characters. Literary scholar Vladimir Novikov says that the poet acts as a "satirist in the Gogol's style". meaning that he uses humor to critique society. This is evident in the story of Vanya and Zina, where their family history is portrayed with "laughter visible to the world" and "unknown tears".

It's not "condescending complicity" or "rude flirtation". It's human sympathy, the awareness of closeness and shared fate with the characters. This doesn't contradict the sharpness and wit of exposing the sadness and absurdity of life. This is the "inner being" of the poet in this poem. This is how the author of the Conversation at the television set felt. "I prefer the Russian tradition, Gogol's tradition — laughing while crying. You laugh, but it also makes you feel sad".

== Signs of time ==
Researchers say that Vysotsky's poetry is full of signs, symbols, associations, and everyday-life details. These details show the public mood in the USSR from 1960 to 1970. It's no coincidence that one of the books about the poet's work is called Vysotsky as an Encyclopedia of Soviet Life. In it, Andrey Krylov and Anatoly Kulagin, along with other experts, closely analyze parts of Conversation at the Television Set and explain the ideas that were a part of the daily life of Vysotsky's peers.

So, in the lines "Oh, Vanya, look what clowns! / Their mouths could be sewn shut... / Oh, what a lot of makeup they have, Vanya, / And their voices sound like alcoholics!" is a reference to the work of Oleg Popov and Yuri Nikulin, clowns popular in the 1970s. They worked together with the eccentric Mikhail Shuydin. Oleg Popov often performed with a big, exaggerated smile, and Yuri Nikulin was known for playing Fool. "Fool" appeared in popular comedies by Leonid Gaidai (Moonshiners, Operation 'Y' and Shurik's Other Adventures, Kidnapping, Caucasian Style) and Yevgeny Karelov (Seven Old Men and A Girl).

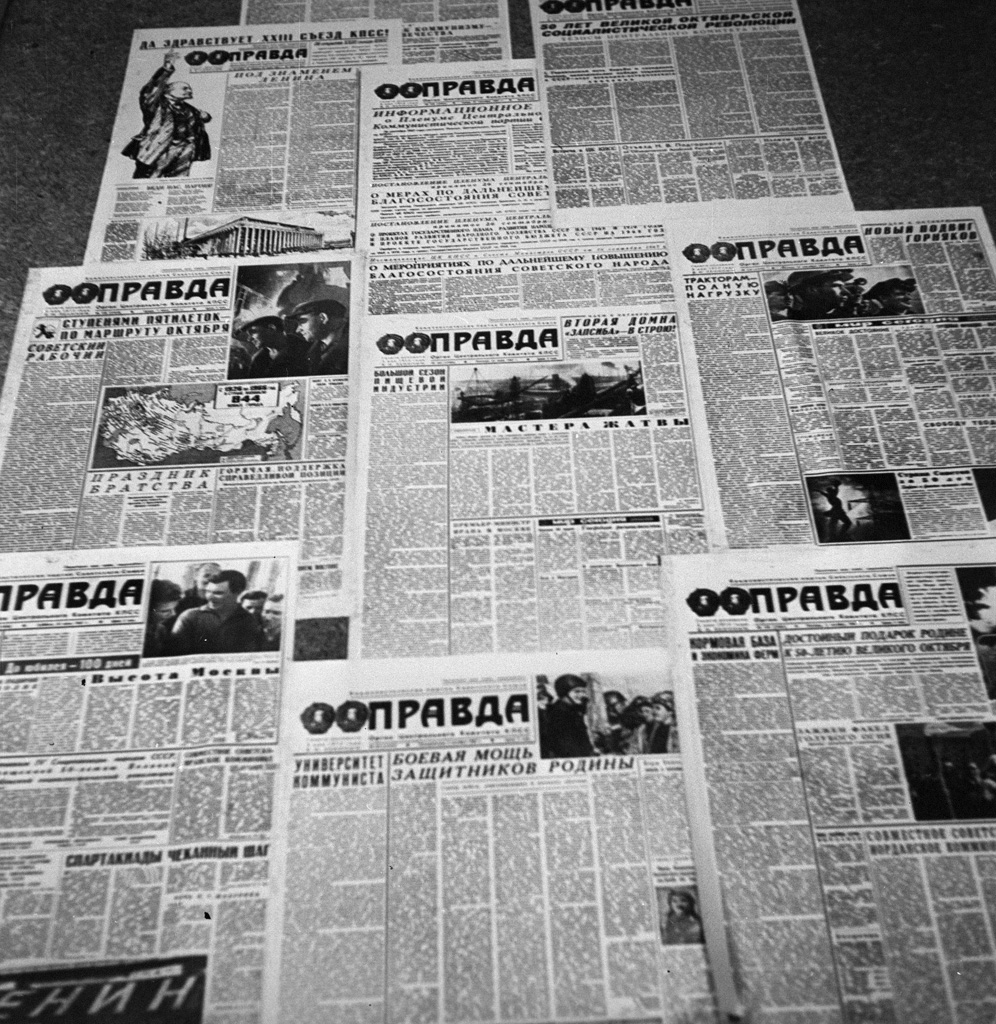
Pravda newspaper, 1968

Zina's next line ("Oh, Vanya, look at these little dwarfs! / They're wearing in jersey, not cheviot, - / At our Fifth Garment Factory / Hardly anyone can sew such a thing". The line contains terms related to the fashion of the time. "Jersey" is a name for a stretchy, soft woolen fabric. The widespread use of this fabric was promoted by Coco Chanel. "Cheviot" is a type of thick fabric that comes in a single color (usually gray, black, or blue) and is often used to make coats and other outerwear. The fifth sewing factory, where the heroine works, used to be called the Moscow Order of the Red Banner of Labor Sewing Factory No. 5, named after Profintern. During the period described in the story, the factory was located in Maly Karetny Lane, not far from the house on Bolshoy Karetny, where the author of the song lived. R. M. Klimova, Vysotsky's neighbor from 1938 to 1947, worked at this factory.

Vanya's reply to his wife also references current fashion trends: "My friends, though not in bologna, / But they don't steal from the family". In the USSR of the second half of the 20th century, raincoats and raincoats made of bologna fabric — a nylon fabric with a one-sided waterproof coating — were considered "the standard of urban elegance". Zinina's factory life may also be connected with the line: "And your friends, Zin, // All knit caps for winters" refers to a type of additional income that was punishable under the Criminal Code of the RSFSR (article Private Entrepreneurship) to supplement the meager family budget. In times of total shortage, including yarn for knitting, its source could be theft from production.

The couple says things like, "And they always drink such bad alcohol at such an early hour!" and "But they drink such bad alcohol out of economy: / They drink it in the morning but for their own money!", "The other one drank even gasoline!" show what life was like in the Soviet Union during the 1970s. At that time, the government was the only one who allowed to make alcohol, and it was illegal to make own alcohol. Since it was expensive to buy alcohol, people used perfume and cologne as substitutes. They also used other things to make alcohol, like window cleaners, denatured alcohol, and glue BF-6. These products were called "benzocognac" (a mixture of gasoline and alcohol that was then burned), "liquor 'Chassis'" from aviation ingredients and others.

Vanya was angry when Zina wanted to buy a T-shirt. Vanya said, "The quarterly bonus is gone! / Who wrote complaints about me to my workplace? / Not you?! I did read them!") refers to the custom in the Soviet Union to discuss the public behavior of a person at the general meetings at the enterprises. Party and trade union organizations of factories and plants would discuss how to deal with members of the workforce who behaved badly. Sometimes, this led to punishment, like losing bonuses or getting in trouble. According to Anatoly Kulaguin, "the personal lives of Soviet people were exposed, just like the characters in Yevgeny Zamyatin's anti-utopia novel We lived behind glass walls".

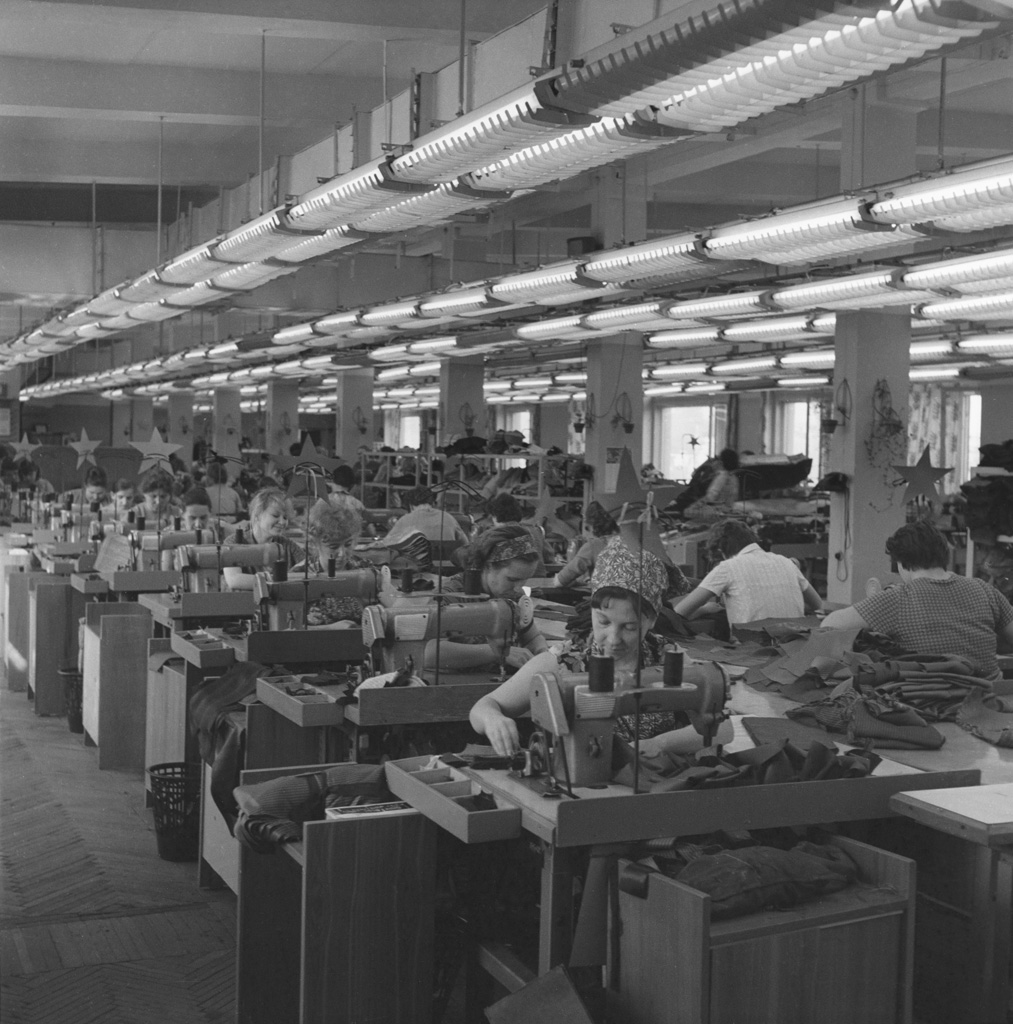
A garment factory, 1967

In Zina's line, "Oh, Vanya, I'll die from doing all these acrobatic moves! Look how it spins, cheeky!" Our head shop assistant, comrade Satikov, recently in the club so jumped". According to researchers, the name of the shop assistant, Satikov, sounds the same as the name Pavel Satyukov, who worked from 1956 to 1964 as editor-in-chief of the newspaper Pravda. Since 1971, he had been in charge of the editorial office of popular science and educational programs of the Soviet Central Television. The event mentioned by the heroine may have taken place in the Nadezhda Krupskaya Club, which is located in the building of the Fifth Garment Factory.

== First editions, recordings, performances, translations, reviews ==
The first time the song was recorded was in January 1973 at a concert in Leningrad. On October 8, 1974, the Taganka Theatre troupe was on tour in Leningrad and was invited to appear on television. This was a rare opportunity for Vysotsky to perform for a large audience. The organizers of the program and theater director Yuri Lyubimov gave him more airtime than the other members of the troupe. Vysotsky sang three of his songs: We Spin the Earth, Ballad of the Short Neck, and Conversation at the Television Set, as well as The Song of the Akyn based on the poem by Andrei Voznesensky. He also read another of Voznesensky's poems, "I ask for a failure, for a failure...". A phonogram of that evening and a video recording of Vysotsky's performance of the song Conversation at the television set have been preserved.

In September 1975, during a tour of the Taganka Theater in Bulgaria (by an invitation of Lyudmila, the daughter of Bulgaria's leader Todor Zhivkov), Vysotsky was invited to Radio Sofia. There, in one of the studios, he recorded a CD for the Balkanton record company. Because Vysotsky was very busy, the recording session was held at night without any rehearsals. Vysotsky and his musicians were brought to the studio by car by Ivan Slavkov, the head of Bulgarian television and Ludmila's husband. In those days, according to people who saw it happen, the highest officials had to approve events like this. This recording of Vysotsky's songs, including "Conversation at the television set" with guitar accompaniment by theater colleagues Dmitry Mezhevich and Vitaly Shapovalov, was first released on the Bulgarian record Self-Portrait in 1981 in an abridged version. It was later, in 1999, released in Russia on a CD of the same name by SoLyd Records with author's comments.

The text of the song was printed in 1977 in Paris in a collection of poems called Songs of Russian Bards, and then in the fall of that year it was recorded for the album La corde raide under the title "Le cirque conjugal". In 1978, a part of the song, called Conversation at the television set, was performed by Kira Smirnova, who played the role of one of the heroines (the old woman Malanya) in the movie A Dog walked along the Piano. A part of the song was also performed by Kira Smirnova in the film A Dog Was Walking on the Piano. In 1979, the song was published in the first issue of the almanac Metropol, published by the American publishing house Ardis. The almanac included twenty of the poet's poems. According to Evgeny Popov, one of the people who put the collection together, Vysotsky was very involved in getting his poems ready to be published. He spent a lot of time choosing the best versions of the poems and making changes to some of the lines.

In the USSR, the song was first published in the collection Nerv in 1981. In 1985, the author performed the song in one of the episodes of the Confrontation miniseries. Five years later, in 1976, the Melodiya company released the song on the record Delayed Drop (the twelfth of the series On Vladimir Vysotsky's Concerts, M60 49341 006). The song was last performed publicly on August 30, 1979.

In 1983, the poem was translated into Romanian and published in the Bucharest foreign literature magazine Secolul 20 (translated by Madlene Fortunescu). Since the 1990s, the song has been part of Jaromír Nohavica's repertoire. Milan Dvořák translated it into Czech.

The poet's contemporaries liked the song. Nahum Korzhavin said he wasn't ready to listen to all of Vysotsky's songs, but he liked the "domestic drama" about Vanya and Zina. Mihail Chemiakin, an artist, met Vysotsky in France. There, they held a concert for guests in an old mansion on Rue de Grenelle. That evening, Vysotsky performed Conversation at the television-set, and Chemiakin wrote about it as a work where the audience saw "a unique 'mockingbird,' observant, subtle, ironic, and kind". Actor and director Anatoly Vasiliev said that when Vysotsky performed the song at the Taganka Theater during a performance of Antiworlds, it caused a stir in the audience and bewilderment among his colleagues on stage. They thought he was trying to "pull the blanket over himself" (i.e., to put the whole spotlight onto himself).

== Song's versions ==
Vysotsky strove to constantly improve his works, so textologists have arrived at numerous variants of his songs. As researchers of the poet's work note, his work was usually divided into two main stages. Writing a handwritten text ended only the first of them. Since Vysotsky relied on the listener rather than the reader of his works, most of his autographs are autocommunicative, i.e. they are intended for his own use. They often lack punctuation marks (or contain redundant ones), the manuscripts abound with their own symbols, and the verses are organized according to the author's own vision. There are frequent cases of writing "variants on variants".

From the moment the text became a song, the second stage began. From performance to performance, including mini-concerts in front of friends and relatives, the poet was able to make changes to the text. This deliberate offering of different "concert performances" to the listener was lamented by Alexander Galich, who, while speaking warmly of Vysotsky, nevertheless believed that he was not always demanding of his repertoire (Anatoly Kulagin and Andrei Krylov see the reason for this statement in the publication of "obviously raw and inferior works"). Often late changes in the lyrics were not recorded on paper, so in the presence of a mass of phonograms, both amateur and professional, as well as different recording times, listeners sometimes got the false impression that the same song could be sung by the author from performance to performance in different text variants - depending on his mood or the composition of the audience. Researchers point out that this is a false conclusion based on the different, chaotic timing of earlier or later recordings reaching listeners. When Vysotsky changed words or verses in his songs, he usually did not return to the old version. He could present something to the audience in different ways —musically or artistically— but more often in the last textual version.

In the first editions of Conversation at the television set there were the last lines: "Wow, what a gymnast! / Look what she's doing, though she's quite old - (variant: Look at her legs on screws) / At our dairy cafe Swallow / The waitress can do it. / And your friends, Zin, / Are all still knitting hats for winter, - / Their boring pictures / Make you stupid, Zin! / Like Vanya, — and Lilka Fedoseyeva, (Note: “Lilka Fedoseyeva” is a presumed allusion to Lidia Fedoseyeva-Shukshina, who played the role of Tanya in the film Peers, in which Vysotsky played his first cameo in a movie in 1959.) / The Gorky Park cashier? / The one who's having a housewarming party... She's so nice!... / Instead of fighting, Vanya, let's go on vacation to Yerevan...! / Well, 'leave' always means 'leave' - / It's a shame, Vanya! When performing this version, Vysotsky sometimes sang the third and fourth lines in place of Zina, instead of Vanya. The early version about the "gasoline-drinking" Georgian was replaced in later versions by "a friend from the tire factory". As recalled by Vsevolod Abdulov, Vysotsky explained the reason for the change as follows: "Well, what kind of Georgian would drink gasoline?"

In the drafts, which were studied by Vysotsky scholars Arkady Lvov and Alexander Sumerkin, were discovered and later published lines from the sketches of the song: "She's going to fall off these benches! / Well, coach - snake, well, you're good! / Now this rubber is going to crunch - / Look, bent like a galosh! / Oh! Vanya! Dogs on a rope! / Let's take one of the dogs. / She'll give it to us, why does she need everything!" In interviews with Boris Akimov and Oleg Terentyev, the poet said that this version also contained the stanzas "I, Vanya, passionately love the blacks..." and belonged to the "indecent" version of the song, which he did not sing.

== Artistic features ==
=== In Vysotsky's poetic cycle context ===
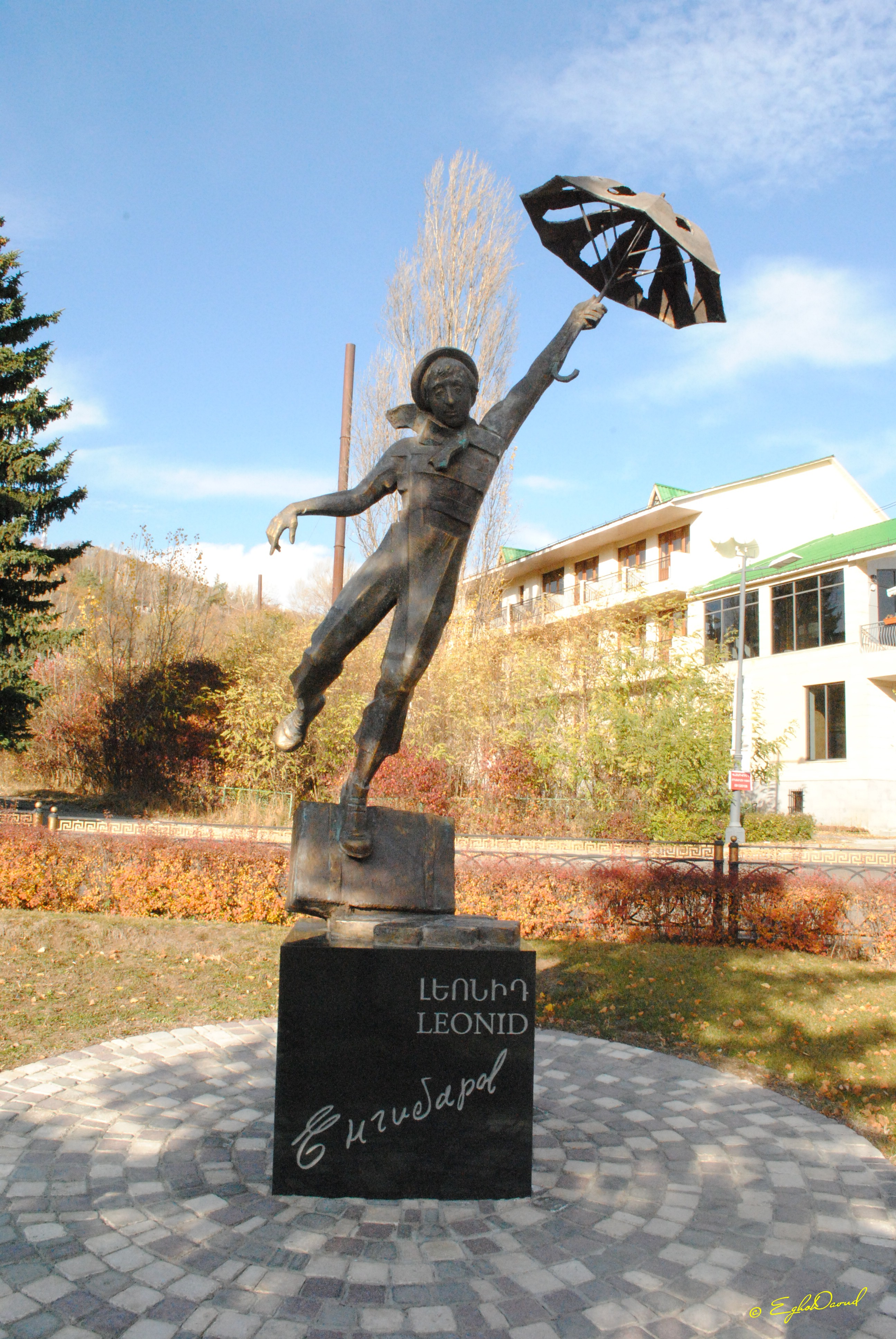
Leonid Yengibarov Monument

According to researchers, Conversation at the television set can be included in a number of Vysotsky's poetic cycles. First of all, we are talking about the group of satirical works, in which the direction related to social and domestic themes is emphasized. Despite the fact that such a classification is very tentative and the boundaries of the criteria are shaky and blurred, Vysotskologists place the story of Vanya and Zina on the same level as such poetic texts as Comrades of Scientists, Family Affairs in Ancient Rome, and the Envy Song.

Vysotsky began to develop the theme of marital relations and the behavior of "men and women in different epochs" several years before writing Conversation, when he began to create the cycle History of the Family. The song About Love in the Stone Age, composed in 1969 ("Give me back my stone axe! / And don't touch my hip skins! / Don't say a word, I can hardly see you. / Sit out - and keep the fire going!"), the poet noted that the title of the cycle contained a parodic reference to Friedrich Engels' work The History of the Family, Private Property and the State, which was included in all university programs at the time. The very idea of a work about the love of cave dwellers could have been inspired by urban folklore, in particular by the variations of the couplet "Remember the Mesozoic Culture?" known since the early 1950s ("In the smoky half-dusk of the cave, / Where water dripped from the walls, / An anecdote from the Archean era / I told you then").

The opinions of researchers differ on whether Conversation at the television set should be included in the Family History cycle. For example, philologist M. V. Zaitseva believes that within the framework of "hypothetical Vysotskology" the conditional "family series" should be expanded and consist of works written both before 1969 (for example, She to the Yard — He from the Yard) and much later Conversation at the television set. Anatoly Kulagin disagrees with this approach and believes that the poetic texts mentioned differ in their poetics. At the same time, the literary scholar does not exclude that the dialogic form of couplets about the Mesozoic culture could have a certain influence on the song about Vanya and Zina, as well as on other works of Vysotsky created in a similar genre.

An entertainment performance in the arena, watched by a couple, was the reason for including Conversation at the television set in Vysotsky's so-called Circus Cycle. Researchers compare the characters watching the performance of clowns and acrobats from the outside with a person living inside this action - we are talking about the hero of the poem To Yengibarov from the audience".

According to Marina Vlady's recollections, Leonid Yengibarov, who worked "in minor tones," was one of Vysotsky's favorite artists: "He is also a kind of poet, he makes you laugh and cry". The "sad clown" in the piece dedicated to him "stole" sad moments from the audience. All the moments stolen from the audience, the fool took with him backstage - and this burden was unbearable for the 37-year-old clown (Yengibarov died in 1972, on the same day as Vysotsky - July 25). Vanya and Zina's perception of the circus performance is also built on the level of a moment, but the spontaneity of their reactions and associations ("And that one looks like - no, really, Vanya - / Like my brother-in-law - such a drunk") is naive and ridiculous — the characters are able to evaluate art purely through "their own everyday life".

The question of the inclusion of Conversation at the television set (as well as some other works of the poet) in various thematic cycles is controversial in Vysotsky studies. Thus, the philologist V. A. Gavrikov, in his work on Vysotsky's cycle-making, notes that the appearance of the story about Vanya and Zina in the Circus Cycle becomes the occasion for the birth of random (not always having clear criteria for unification) "song communities":

With the same reasoning, however, it can also be included in the "gender cycle", where a dialogue takes place between the subject "he" and the subject "she" — remember Two Letters. And we can assign Conversation... to the "alcoholic cycle": there are many "drunken" signs there.

=== Genre uniqueness ===
Conversation at the television set embodies the author's dramaturgical thinking. Being a miniature play, it is close in genre to the topical comic couplets popular in the mid-20th century by the members of the pop music duo Shurov and Rykunin. At the same time, according to Vysotskologists Andrei Skobelev and Sergei Shaulov, any even hypothetical attempt to divide the song about Vanya and Zina between two performers is doomed to failure. Despite the fact that Conversation belongs to the dramatic genre, it retains the characteristics of a lyrical work and contains a penetrating authorial beginning: "That is why the author-performer is so interesting, masterfully intoning the parts of the characters, changing the timbre of the voice, constantly splitting, but - united". According to Yuri Shatin, the chief researcher of the literary branch of the Institute of Philology of the Siberian Branch of the Russian Academy of Sciences, the ease with which Vysotsky's characters communicate with each other is due to the poet's ability to reproduce a worldly situation according to the canon of Socratic Conversation.

Vysotsky restores the lost function to the dialogue — each detail is updated in the process of progressive movement, sharpening the artistic interest in it as such. But the dialogue itself is transformed into the linguistic element of everyday consciousness. If in Plato's dialogue it is Socrates, Parmenides and Tineus, in Vysotsky's dialogue it is Lilka Fedoseyeva, the head of the shop Satyukov, some Georgians and finally Vanya and Zina, the main speaking characters.

The similarity of this song to ancient forms is evident even at the lexical level. The philologist R.L. Lobastov illustrates this with the example of the line of Kritius from the Byzantine satirical dialogue "The Patriot or the Scholar". Addressing the interlocutor, the hero says: "Be quiet for a while and leave me alone, Triephontes, right, then I will not ignore you". Similarly, but in modern everyday language, Vanya responds to his wife's demands: "You'd better shut up, Zin, you'd better shut up - / The quarter's bonus is gone".

The story of Vanya and Zina is by no means the only work of Vysotsky's that is based on a dialogue or has an explicit attitude toward an understanding interlocutor. In terms of its poetics, it is close to such songs as Instruction Before Traveling Abroad, Letter from the Tambov Factory Workers to the Chinese Leaders, and Police Protocol. Separately, researchers distinguish Letter to the Exhibition and Letter from the Exhibition, which are correspondence between spouses. As in Conversation at the television set, the initiator of the communication here is the wife, who admonishes her husband, who has gone to the VDNKh: "Don't drink there, Kolya, don't drink, wait until you get home". In response, Kolya gives a strange account: "I haven't drunk vodka yet - not even a shot! This "epistolary contact", looking at the same situation from different angles, is similar to the conversation between Vanya and Zina.

=== Literary and folkloric parallels ===
According to Igor Kokhanovsky, one of the authors whose works Vysotsky knew well from his youth was the writer Mikhail Zoshchenko. His influence (ironic narrative style, role masks separating the author from the characters, colloquial language of the characters) can be seen in the poet's early works, beginning with the song Tattoo. In letters to his relatives, Vysotsky, talking about business, sometimes reproduced slightly modified quotations from Zoshchenko. Thus, researchers believe that the phrase, present in one of the letters to his wife Lyudmila Abramova ("They pretended that nothing terrible, but in the soul harbored some rudeness") is not only a direct reference to Zoshchenko's short story The Mechanic (Монтёр) ("...in the soul harbored some rudeness"), but also serves as a kind of preface to the emergence of the line "You, Zina, are asking for the rudeness!" The difference in the depiction of everyday situations is that the writer's characters are sometimes ugly, while the poet's Zina and Vanya are funny and ridiculous rather than ugly.

Perhaps this is due to the fact that for Zoshchenko his characters are people of a different culture, while for Vysotsky —of the same culture— he tries to understand them without opposing them. As a result, his "dialogue with everyday consciousness" (V. Tolstykh) does not turn into condemnation or ridicule, but helps to understand that it too has the right to exist.

Almost every verse of the Conversation, from the beginning, is one variation or another of Zina's exclamation to her husband: "Oh, Vanya! Look what clowns they are! All these lines are probably taken from a popular example of court folklore in the second half of the 1950s, The Queen of Nepal, which included the lines: "Vas, look, what a woman, / Vas, she's slimmer than a cedar. / Vas, why is she married / To a king named Mahendra? In addition, in the plot of "Conversation" researchers see a certain influence of the poem written in 1961 by Andrei Voznesensky "Our Neighbor Bukashkin Lives with Us", included in the collection Antiworlds: "Why do Antiworlds meet in the middle of the night? / Why do they sit together / and watch television? Vysotsky himself, presenting the work at one of his concerts in April 1978, drew a parallel between the characters of "Conversation" and the characters of Fanny Gordon's Foxtrot, which was part of the repertoire of Leonid Utyosov and Pyotr Leshchenko in the early 1930s: "They're sitting like 'At the samovar me and my Masha' — you remember, don't you? Here, Zina and Vanya are sitting at the television set".

The question of the possible mutual influence of Conversation at the television set Set and Alexander Dolsky's Front Entrance remains open. According to Vysotsky's contemporaries, the two singer-songwriters did not get along. For example, in the second half of the 1960s, Dolsky wrote Orpheus the Bandit, which is a parody of the "Song about the Evil Spirits" and contains the lines: "He pounded his guitar mercilessly, / Like a leshiy after a hangover is slapping the dominoes. / And with his thundering, square-filling bass / He roared over everything in C minor. / It's so terribly good". Vysotsky, answering questions from the audience at the Moscow State University Geoclub (1978) about Dolsky's parodies, remarked that "they write them when they themselves cannot". Memories of eyewitnesses have also survived, according to which the poet while in Leningrad characterized his colleague very caustically. Among Dolsky's songs, which, as the researcher Andrei Syomin writes, "clearly imitate Vysotsky's character", Front Entrance stands out ("Don't put it on the windowsill, Valya, / Residents walk here, they'll see it. / See? Let the beauty pass by, / Wait at least five minutes"). However, according to some sources, this work was written a year before the appearance of "Conversation at the television set".

== Music and performance ==
The melody of the song is a recitative, characteristic of Vysotsky's early songs (such as "Red, Green", "Ninka-navodchitsa:) and peculiar to works of a feuilleton character (such as "The Song of an Envious"). Naum Shafer draws parallels between Vysotsky's song and Isaak Dunayevsky's 1927 operetta The Bridegrooms. The duet of Agraphena and the billiard scorer from this work was, according to his testimony, "witty, satirical, effective, melodically infectious..." and became an almost obligatory number for "assembly" concerts of musical theater artists. The beauty of this duet number, in his opinion, is that "by parodying popular everyday intonations and forcing his characters to express themselves with hackneyed musical phrases, the composer emphasizes the standardization of their thinking and feelings, their philistine outlook and spiritual inferiority". In Schafer's opinion, Vysotsky does the same thing in the song Conversation at the television set. As an illustration, he cites Vanya's reprimanding remark to Zina: "You'd better shut up!" and notes that it is set to a musical phrase from the Cuban song Who are you? He sees this as a special musical and poetic device: the "gloomy" hero of Vysotsky's song has no melody of his own in his soul, the character reveals himself through the unintelligibility of musical intonations and tries to adapt to his outpourings the foreign schlager that "came to hand".

Vysotsky performs Conversation at the television set with two voices. According to Vysotskologists, when performing this song, the poet masterfully performs the functions of the actors, as wells as of the director, turning it into a stage play.

== Legacy ==
According to a survey conducted by VTsIOM specialists in 1997 among residents of the Russian capital, at the end of the 20th century Conversation at the television set (along with Hunting for Wolves and Song about a Friend) was among their favorite works by Vysotsky; the three songs were preferred by Muscovites with higher education, as well as housewives among the wives of executives. In the summer of 2015, a survey on Vysotsky's works was conducted in 46 regions of Russia by the Levada Center, a non-governmental research organization. The respondents, who were asked to name their favorite works, included Conversation in the top five most recognizable songs of the poet.

Evidence of the popularity of Conversation at the television set during the author's lifetime is an episode from the feature film by Vladimir Grammatikov A Dog walked along the Piano (1978), in which the folklorist Chizh, who has come to the village, asks the local inhabitant — grandmother Malanya — to sing an old song that was part of the repertoire of her parents and grandparents. The woman sings "And you really have, Vanya". When the folk art collector remarks that "it's modern, it's Vysotsky," the village singer replies that her grandfather "sang it. He knew Vysotsky".

Researchers, talking about the influence of Conversation on the mass consciousness, note that the song, which tells the story of Vanya and Zina, for decades has been divided into quotations, becoming "part of the popular phraseology" — we are talking about the lines "Listen, Zin, do not touch the brother-in-law", "Look, you will wait for me" and others. In terms of the number of aphorisms that have entered everyday use, Vysotsky's work is comparable to Griboyedov's comedy Woe from Wit. According to the director Yuri Lyubimov, people began to speak in Vysotsky's phrases, and appeals such as "You, Zin, on the rudeness of rude" have become an element of modern folklore: "That is, he, like Griboyedov, is included in the proverbs". The art historian Natalia Rubinshtein notes that Vanya's tirade "When you come home, there you sit", which has become a proverb, embodies "historically accumulated family and communal irritation of the Soviet man against his neighbor".

The analysis of newspaper and magazine headlines made by researchers in 2000–2006 revealed that one of the leaders in terms of quotability is the expression "Where's the money, Zin?", which appeared in the titles of various publications, verbatim or in transformed form, more than 130 times. The print media also actively used such phrases from the Conversation text as "Look at those clowns/dwarfs!", "I, Vanya, want one just like that!", "They drink crap - out of economy", "You're being rude", "It's a shame, Vanya!"

The reasons and conditions that ensured the transition of Vysotsky's song quotations into winged units are manifold. First of all, behind each of these quotations there was a very popular author. The absolute majority of listeners and spectators recognized the outstanding personality of the singer, poet and actor. Second, the song itself —a work of small form— could be performed repeatedly, reproduced by gramophone records and cassette tapes, so that it was constantly "in the ear". Third, the rapid assimilation of these quotations by native speakers was facilitated by their colloquial-prosthetic design.

Researchers find a certain closeness between the structure of Vysotsky's songs-Conversations (including Conversation at the television set) with contained in them "elements of speech genres of transcripts" and individual works of Alexander Bashlachev, which contain "stylistically marked vocabulary, direct speech, proper names reflecting the character of the era". The influence of Conversation can also be traced in the work of another rock performer — Viktor Tsoi; in particular, we are talking about the fourth studio album of the group Kino - This is not love, where several songs are performed "in semantically significant low or high tonalities, in different voice timbre", with the use of masks of different characters: "We get a theatrical performance with the help of the voice".

Conversation at the television set is recommended for optional study in literature classes of Russian secondary schools. Vysotskologist Anatoly Kulagin, who wrote the chapter The Author's Song for the textbook Russian Literature of the 20th Century. Grade 11, notes that classes should pay attention to "the art of intonation, the directorial skill of the poet" when analyzing this song. The translated text of the work about Vanya and Zina is also included in the Czech Republic's 2007 Short Textbook of Literature, which includes Vysotsky among other Soviet authors.

== See also ==
- Ballad of Childhood
- Lukomorye no longer exists

== Bibliography ==
- Bakin, V. (2011). Владимир Высоцкий. Жизнь после смерти [Vladimir Vysotsky. Life after death.]. Лучшие биографии (in Russian). М.: Алгоритм. ISBN 978-5-457-51403-4.
- Владимир Высоцкий: Исследования и материалы 2007—2009 гг.: сборник научных трудов [Vladimir Vysotsky: Studies and materials 2007-2009: collection of scientific papers] (in Russian). Воронеж: Воронежский государственный педагогический университет. 2009. p. 248. ISBN 978-5-88519-533-1.
- "Всё не так, ребята…": Владимир Высоцкий в воспоминаниях друзей и коллег [“Everything is wrong, guys...": Vladimir Vysotsky in the memories of friends and colleagues]. Великие шестидесятники (in Russian). М.: АСТ. 2017. p. 512. ISBN 978-5-17-098692-7.
- Vysotsky, V. (2012). Песни беспокойства. Избранные произведения. Рукописи. СПб.: Вита Нова. p. 584. ISBN 978-5-93898-391-5.
- Vysotsky, V. (1991). Сочинения. В 2 томах [Essays. In 2 volumes.] (in Russian). Vol. 1. М.: Художественная литература. p. 639. ISBN 5-280-02361-2.
- Vysotsky, V. (1996). Собрание сочинений в пяти томах [Works Collection in Five Volumes] (in Russian). Vol. 3. Песни и стихи. 1973—1975. Тула: Тулица. p. 408. ISBN 5-86152-005-4.
- Vysotsky, V. (2012). Летела жизнь в плохом автомобиле: [Стихотворения] [Life flew by in a bad automobile: [Poems]] (in Russian). СПб.: Амфора. p. 127. ISBN 978-5-367-02110-3.
- Krylov, A. E.; Kulaguin, A. V. (2010). Высоцкий как энциклопедия советской жизни: Комментарий к песням поэта [Vysotsky as an encyclopedia of Soviet life: Commentary on the poet's songs] (in Russian). М.: Булат. p. 384. ISBN 978-5-91-457-008-5.
- Kulaguin, A. V. (2016). Беседы о Высоцком [Conversations about Vysotsky] (in Russian). Издательские решения. p. 164. ISBN 978-5-4474-8196-4.
- Kulaguin, A. (2013). Поэзия Высоцкого: Творческая эволюция [Vysotsky's Poetry: Artistic Evolution] (in Russian). Воронеж: Эхо. p. 230.
- Lobastov, R. L. (2011). Жанровая память и автокоммуникативная модель в стихотворении "Диалог у телевизора" В. Высоцкого [Genre memory and auto-communicative model in the poem “Conversations at the TV set” by V. Vysotsky] (in Russian). Новосибирск: Сибирский филологический журнал. pp. 83–88.
- Novikov, V. (2013). Высоцкий [Vysotsky]. Жизнь замечательных людей (in Russian). М.: Молодая гвардия. p. 492. ISBN 978-5-235-03554-6.
- Novikov, V. I. (1991). В Союзе писателей не состоял [He was not a part of the Writers' Union] (in Russian). М.: СП Интерпринт. p. 224. ISBN 5-7100-0038-8.
- Syomin, А. B. (2012). "Чужие" песни Владимира Высоцкого [“Alien” songs by Vladimir Vysotsky] (in Russian). Воронеж: Эхо. p. 231.
- Shilina, O. Yu. (2009). Творчество Владимира Высоцкого и традиции русской классической литературы [Creative work of Vladimir Vysotsky and the traditions of Russian classical literature] (in Russian). СПб.: Островитянин. p. 224. ISBN 978-5-98921-024-4.
