= Aleksandr Galibin =

Soviet and Russian actor

- Александр Галибин
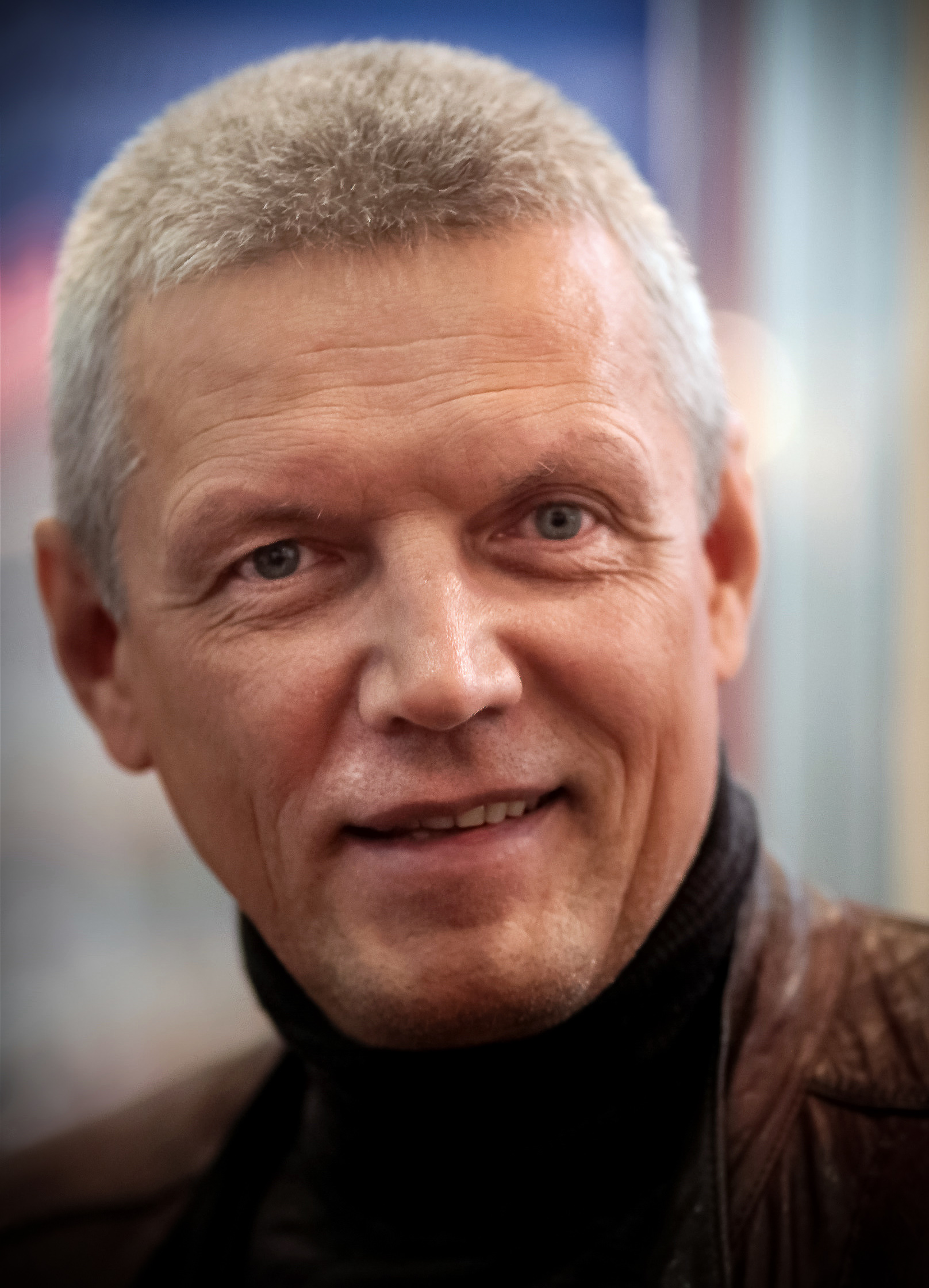
- Galibin in 2011
- Born: 27 September 1955 (age 71); Leningrad, Russian SFSR, Soviet Union
- Education: Komissarjevsky Theatre; Liteiny Theatre; Novosibirsk Globus Theatre; Alexandrinsky Theatre; Moscow Drama Theater. Stanislavsky; School of Modern Drama
- Occupations: Actor; theatre director; television presenter
- Years active: 1976–present

Alexander Vladimirovich Galibin (Russian: Александр Владимирович Галибин, born 27 September 1955) is a Soviet and Russian actor noted for playing the Master in the miniseries The Master and Margarita (2005).

His acting career spans over four decades and includes such memorable roles as Tsar Nicholas II in Gleb Panfilov's The Romanovs: A Crowned Family (2000).

== Biography ==
Alexander Galibin was born in Leningrad, Russian SFSR, Soviet Union. He first started his acting career as a theater actor at the Theater of Youth Creativity directed by Matvey Dubrovin. From 1973 to 1977, he studied acting at the Faculty of LGITMiK. His film debut was in the 1976 film ...And Other Officials.

From 1977 to 1979, he was an actor of the Komissarjevsky Theatre. He played in the performances: "The Legend of the Dunce's Hat" (King Philip), "Five Evenings" (Glory), "Bumbarash" (Lyovka), "Tsar Boris" (the shadow of Tsarevich Dmitry, Chechen, Fyodor Godunov), "Ten unopened letters" (builders of BAM) and others.

== Filmography ==
- The Pilot. A Battle for Survival (2021) as surgeon
- Deadly Illusions (2020) as Pyotr Istomin
- Wolf (2020) TV series as General Sukhodeev
- Whirlpool (2020) TV series as Stavkevich
- Shadows over Balkan (2017) TV series as General Vrangel
- The Road to Calvary (2017) TV series as Boris Savinkov
- Doctor Richter (2017) TV series as Dr. Kalinin
- Raid (2016) TV series as Kiselyov
- Champions: Faster. Higher. Stronger (2016) as Leonid Arkayev
- Demons (2014) TV series as Governor von Lembke
- 22 minutes (2014) as Dekalin
- Survive After (2013) TV series as Ivan Sergeevich Radomsky
- Revelations (2009) TV series as Ilya Petrovich
- 9th May. Personal Attitude (2008) as blind man
- The Ruler's Fate (2008) as Pavel Tsitsianov
- Adel (2008) as Zakharov
- Friend or Foe (2007) TV series as Vitaly Petrovich Ilyukhin, Colonel
- 40 (2007) as Mikhail
- He, She and Me (2007) as Dmitry Belyavsky
- Konservy (2007) as Valery Astrakhantsev
- The Master and Margarita (2005) TV mini-series as Master
- Ragin (2004) as Ivan Dmitrievich Gromov
- The Romanovs: An Imperial Family (2000) as Tsar Nicholas II
- It (1989) as holy fool
- Tamara Aleksandrovna's Husband and Daughter (1988) as Valery
- Jack Vosmyorkin, American (1987) as Vasily Kapralov
- Silver Strings (1987) as Vasily Andreyev
- Exceptions without Rules (1986) TV as Steranov
- Way to Yourself (1986) TV mini-series as Vladimir Krylov
- Steppe Squadron (1986) as agronomist
- The Life of Klim Samgin (1986) TV series as Diomidov; Nicholas II of Russia
- Battalions Ask for Fire (1985) TV mini-series as senior lieutenant Kondratyev
- Coordinates of Deat (1985) as Ilya Krutin
- My Chosen One (1984) as deputy Zuykov
- I am Responsible for You (1984) as zampolit
- No Special Risk (1983) as police lieutenant Viktor Sergeevich Petrov
- Start Liquidation (1983) as Burkovsky
- Greetings from the Front (1983) TV as Misha Voskoboynikov
- Disturbing Departure (1983) as Kokorev
- My Love is Revolution (1982) TV as Viktor Poddubtsev
- We Weren't Married in Church (1982) as Sinegub
- The Donkey's Hide (1982) as Prince Jacques
- The Sixth (1981) as the gunner
- A Tale Told at Night (1981) as coal miner Peter Munk
- One Hundred Joys, or the Book of Great Discoveries (1981) as student
- Who will pay for Luck? (1980) as Antonina's friend
- Poem about Wings (1980) as Kostya
- The Tavern on Pyatnitskaya (1978) as Pashka-America (Pavel Antonov)
- ...And Other Officials (1976) as Yuri Konstantinovich Ivanov

== Awards ==
- Merited Artist of the Russian Federation (1991)
- People's Artist of the Russian Federation (2006)
