= Torpedo Bombers =

- Russian: Торпедоносцы
- Directed by: Semyon Aranovich
- Written by: Aleksei German; Svetlana Karmalita
- Produced by: Aleksei Gusev
- Starring: Rodion Nakhapetov; Aleksei Zharkov; Andrei Boltnev; Stanislav Sadalskiy; Tatyana Kravchenko
- Cinematography: Vladimir Ilyin
- Edited by: Aleksandra Borovskaya
- Music by: Aleksandr Knaifel
- Production company: Lenfilm
- Release date: August 1, 1983
- Running time: 96 min.
- Country: Soviet Union
- Language: Russian

Torpedo Bombers (Russian: Торпедоносцы, romanized: Torpedonostsy) is a 1983 Soviet World War II film directed by Semyon Aranovich based on the unfinished story of Yuri German.

== Plot ==
1944 year. The Second World War. The naval aviation regiment is based at a small airfield. For pilots, this is both front and rear. They complete combat missions and return to their families. But each flight may be the last.

== Cast ==
- Rodion Nakhapetov as Senior Lieutenant Alexander Belobrov
- Aleksei Zharkov as Petty Officer Fyodor Cherepets
- Andrei Boltnev as Captain-Engineer Gavrilov
- Stanislav Sadalskiy as Senior Lieutenant Dmitrienko
- Tatyana Kravchenko as Masha
- Vera Glagoleva as Shura
- Nadezhda Lukashevich as Nastya
- Vsevolod Shilovsky as Sergeant Major Artyukhov
- Sergey Bekhterev as Lieutenant Colonel Kurochkin
- Aleksandr Filippenko as Soviet Air Force Major-General
- Yury Kuznetsov as Lieutenant Colonel Fomenko, Air Regiment Commander
- Eduard Volodarsky as guard captain, crew commander
- Vyacheslav Voronin as episode

== Awards ==
1984 All-Union Film Festival

- Prize for the Best military-patriotic film
- Jury diploma for Best Cinematography (Vladimir Ilyin)

1986 USSR State Prize

- Svetlana Karmalita, Semyon Aranovich, Vladimir Ilyin, Isaac Kaplan, Rodion Nakhapetov
