= Merkuryev =

Merkuryev (Russian: Мерку́рьев) is a Russian surname.

- Alexander Merkurjev (born 1955) is a Russian-born American mathematician, who has made major contributions to the field of algebra;
- Andrey Merkurjev (born 1977) is a Russian ballet dancer;
- Evgeny Merkurjev (1936—2007) was a Soviet and Russian theatre actor, worked in the Na Liteinom Theatre;
- Pyotr Merkuryev (1943–2010) was a Soviet and Russian actor;
- Stanislav Merkuryev (1945—1993) was a Soviet and Russian mathematical physicist;
- Vasili Merkuryev (1904–1978) was a Soviet actor, he appeared in 46 films between 1935 and 1974;
