= Andrei Boltnev =

Soviet-Russian actor (1946–1995)

- Born: Andrei Nikolayevich Tusov; January 5, 1946; Ufa, Soviet Union
- Died: May 12, 1995 (aged 49); Moscow, Russia
- Occupation: Actor
- Years active: 1973—1995
- Spouse: Natalia Mazets

Andrei Nikolayevich Boltnev (Russian: Андре́й Никола́евич Бо́лтнев; January 5, 1946, Ufa — May 12, 1995, Moscow) was a Soviet and Russian actor.

== Biography ==
Andrei Boltnev was born January 5, 1946, in Ufa.

Andrei Boltnev's grandfather, Konstantin Dobzhinsky was People's Artist of Georgia, and his grandmother, Nina Irtenev – Honored Artist of the RSFSR. In his birth certificate, the future actor was recorded as Andrei Tusov. But his father, Vyacheslav Tusov died in 1951, when Andrei was 5 years old, and stepfather of Andrei Nikolay Boltnev, a sea captain, appeared in his life.

Boltnev studied in the Yaroslavl Theatre School from 1970 to 1972. After graduation he worked in theaters Ussuriysk, Maikop and Novosibirsk. In 1985 he graduated from the Ostrovsky Theatre and Art Institute in Tashkent.

Boltnev first appeared on the silver screen in 1983 when he played the role of the vibrant Captain Gavrilov in the film by Semyon Aranovich Torpedo Bombers.

The actor became widely known after the film My Friend Ivan Lapshin directed in 1984 by Aleksei German was released, in which Boltnev starred in the title role.

The real popularity was brought to Boltnev by the television series Confrontation (1985) based on the novel by Julian Semyonov, where Andrei Boltnev played a major role, the traitor Krotov.

In 1985, the actor who worked then in Novosibirsk, received an invitation to the metropolitan Mayakovsky Theatre.

Boltnev died in his sleep of a stroke in Moscow on May 12, 1995. He was buried in Moscow, Vostryakovsky Cemetery.

== Selected filmography ==
- 1983 — Torpedo Bombers as engineer captain Gavrilov
- 1984 — Mikhailo Lomonosov as Kargopolsky
- 1984 — My Friend Ivan Lapshin as Ivan Lapshin
- 1985 — Confrontation as Nikolai Ivanovich Krotov
- 1986/88 — The Life of Klim Samgin as gendarme Colonel Popov
- 1988 — The 13th Apostle as inspector
- 1989 — Who Lives... as Captain Sviderskiy
- 1989 — Hard to Be a God as Budach
- 1989 — Abduction of the Wizard as Landmaster Friedrich von Kockenhausen
- 1990 — Day of Love as Nikolai Ivanovich Kashin
- 1991 — My Best Friend, General Vasili, Son of Joseph Stalin as Astafiev
- 1992 — Black Square as Ponomarev
- 1993 — The Mafia is Immortal as Aleksei Drobyshev

== Awards ==
- Vasilyev Brothers State Prize of the RSFSR
