= Farewell of Slavianka (film) =

- Russian: Прощание славянки
- Directed by: Yevgeny Vasilev
- Written by: Samson Polyakov
- Produced by: Yevgeny Kalinin; Galina Sedova
- Starring: Galina Makarova; Yevgeni Lebedev; Yuriy Nazarov
- Cinematography: Rudolf Zuyev
- Edited by: Svetlana Tarik
- Music by: Mikhail Ziv
- Production company: Sverdlovsk Film Studio
- Release date: 11 August 1986
- Running time: 79 min.
- Country: Soviet Union
- Language: Russian

Farewell of Slavianka (Russian: Прощание славянки, romanized: Proshchaniye slavyanki) is a 1985 Soviet drama film directed by Yevgeny Vasilev.

== Plot ==
Retired Air Force Colonel Alexander Gradov, 45, arrives in Crimea one summer, traveling without hotel reservations in hopes of finding lodging in the private sector—a common practice known as "wild" vacationing. With hotels fully booked, locals make their living renting out rooms, and for many, it’s a matter of survival. Some grow hardened by this business, caring only for profit and becoming indifferent, cynical, and cold. Anna Ivanovna, the stern owner of a large guesthouse, is beginning to resemble such people. A woman who once lost her husband in the war and her son shortly after, she now runs a thriving household and fruit garden, renting out rooms in the summer and selling grapes and peaches. Her guests are well cared for, their stay organized down to the last detail. One of her small traditions is to play the military march "Farewell of Slavianka" over a loudspeaker whenever a guest departs—a gesture her visitors find charming, and for her, a meaningful ritual tied to the memory of wartime youth and human connection.

Gradov manages to secure a room for the night in her home. There, he notices a photo on the wall showing two boys—and suddenly recognizes himself as a child, alongside his childhood friend Vovka, who died of tuberculosis in a children’s sanatorium. The realization strikes deep: he and Vovka had once been treated together, and it was Anna Ivanovna who had brought life-saving penicillin to her son. When it became clear Vovka wouldn’t survive, she gave the medicine to Sasha (young Gradov), selling everything she had to obtain it. Now, years later, their paths cross again. This unexpected reunion with the boy she once saved forces Anna Ivanovna to reflect on the meaning of human bonds, compassion, and the quiet sacrifices that shape lives.

== Cast ==
- Galina Makarova as Anna Ivanovna
  - Natalya Ostrikova as Anna Ivanovna in her youth
- Yevgeni Lebedev as Semyon Protasovich
- Yuriy Nazarov as Alexander Gradov
- Natalya Gundareva as Zhenya
- Viktor Pavlov as Fyodor
- Timofey Spivak as Aleksei
- Maya Bulgakova as Lyudmila Gerasimovna
- Anatoliy Egorov as Leonid
- Sasha Chubykin as Vovka
- Ekaterina Vasilyeva as Lena
