= My Friend Ivan Lapshin =

- Directed by: Aleksei German
- Screenplay by: Eduard Volodarsky
- Based on: One Year by Yuri German
- Produced by: Lenfilm
- Starring: Andrei Boltnev; Nina Ruslanova; Andrei Mironov; Aleksei Zharkov
- Cinematography: Valeri Fedosov
- Edited by: Leda Semyonova
- Music by: Arkadi Gagulashvili
- Release date: 1985
- Running time: 100 minutes
- Country: Soviet Union
- Language: Russian

My Friend Ivan Lapshin (Russian: Мой друг Иван Лапшин, romanized: Moy drug Ivan Lapshin) is a 1985 Soviet crime drama directed by Aleksei German and produced by Lenfilm, based on a novel by Yuri German adapted by Eduard Volodarsky. It was narrated by Valeri Kuzin.

== Background ==
In March 1985, Mikhail Gorbachev was elected General Secretary of the Central Committee of the Communist Party in the Soviet Union. Gorbachev opened the country to Western influence with his reforms "glasnost" (openness) and "perestroika" (restructuring). The Filmmakers Union, the most liberal creative organization at the time, was the first to support Gorbachev. The glasnost period became distinguished by the rediscovery of cinematic hidden gems, the censored films, which were officially known for Stagnation-era artistic talents. These films informed the history of Soviet cinema. Films of this period also depicted modern social and economic deterioration, the loss of ideals, and disillusionment in Communist ideologies.

== Plot ==
The plot of the film tells the story of the head of the Criminal Investigation Department (CID) of the city of Unchansk, named Ivan Lapshin, It presents a short piece of his life and the life of his friends, comrades and acquaintances. The events of the film, taking place in the 1930s, are presented on behalf of a narrator (at that time a 9-year-old boy) who tells about them many years later.

The local CID is engaged in the capture of Solovyov's gang, who are committing senseless and brutal murders. Ivan Lapshin (Andrei Boltnev), is a former participant in hostilities (the Civil War is implied), a strong-willed and decisive person. In matters of combating crime, he knows no compromises. "Let's clean up the land, plant a garden, and we ourselves will still have time to walk in this garden!" is his motto. Approximately the same motto is followed by other members of the task force, supporting themselves from time to time by performing revolutionary songs. Lapshin lives in the same way as most of his subordinates – he rents a "corner", and in fact a "bed" from the old woman Patrikeevna. The vicissitudes of the modest life of the majority of "communal apartments" are shown, of the time when four adults and a child live in a small living space.

In addition to the plot of the communal apartment, the action of the film develops in two more directions – in fact, the work of the search, including raids, interrogations of suspects, communication with a criminal element, and a "love triangle" consisting of a local theater actress (Nina Ruslanova), visiting journalist Khanin (Andrey Mironov), and Lapshin. Khanin and Lapshin have known each other for a long time and maintain good relations. Lapshin is introduced to the actress at the beginning of the unfolding plot, but as soon as he shows sincere sympathy for the actress, she tells him that she secretly loves Khanin.

The inner life of the provincial theater of the post-NEP period is shown, when the classics were side by side on the stage (the "behind the scenes" of the play A Feast during the Plague is shown) and the search for “new subjects in art", such as the "reforging" of former criminals into a socially useful element. All three, and Khanin, and the actress, and Lapshin, good-naturedly play the employee of the UGRO Okoshkin (Aleksey Zharkov), who is striving in every possible way to get married and, finally, to move out of a communal apartment. And he almost succeeds, but by the end of the film, he, tired of the obsessive attention of his wife and her mother, again returns to his old place of residence.

A separate storyline is dedicated to the inner experiences of Khanin himself, whose wife recently died, and he, having temporarily settled in the same communal apartment as Lapshin, being depressed, tries to shoot himself with Lapshin's pistol. Khanin lacks the determination to bring the matter to the end, and then Lapshin promises to take him with him "to catch robbers." During the operation, it is Khanin who notices that while the police officers are raiding the barracks, some person is slowly leaving, as they say, "yards". As it turns out, it was Solovyov himself (Yuri Pomogaev). Since Khanin never caught criminals, when trying to detain Solovyov, the latter stabs him in the stomach with a knife. Subsequently, the police still manage to surround Solovyov. Despite the fact that the offender wants to surrender, Lapshin "carries out the sentence."

After being discharged from the hospital, Khanin offers Lapshin to go with him to the Far East and Siberia to "show places" that Lapshin "never saw", but he refuses. The actress seems to be going to leave with Khanin, but at the last moment she also stays in Unchansk. However, Lapshin no longer intends to maintain close relations with her.

== Themes ==
A central theme in the film is nostalgia. The film switches between black and white and color to accentuate the feeling of nostalgia. The scattered and de-centered narrative structure emulates a dream-like recollection of memories, underscoring the fragility of memory. Another theme is carnival. The carnivalesque rhythm is apparent in the scenes of plays as well as in the festive tone of scenes taking place in the communal house. In this way, the film is a meta-dramatic and surreal. The film also plays with an edge of realism; there are series of shots of ordinary people living their ordinary lives. Moreover, there is theme of idealism: Lapshin exclaims, "We'll clear the land of scum and build an orchard."

== Cast ==
- Andrei Boltnev as Ivan Lapshin
- Nina Ruslanova as Natasha Adashova
- Andrei Mironov as Khanin
- Aleksei Zharkov as Vasya Okoshkin
- Zinaida Adamovich as Patrikeyevna
- Aleksandr Filippenko as Zanadvorov
- Yuriy Kuznetsov as Superintendent
- Valeriy Filonov as Pobuzhinskiy
- Anatoli Slivnikov as Bychkov
- Andrei Dudarenko as Kashin
- Semyon Farada as Jatiev
- Yuri Pomogayev as Solovyov
- Nina Usatova as Solovyov's wife
- Yuri Aroyan as artist of the local theater
- Natalya Laburtseva
- Anna Nikolayeva
- Anatoli Shvedersky
- Vladimir Tochilin
- Boris Vojtsekhovsky

== Production ==
My Friend Ivan Lapshin was filmed in Astrakhan, Russia, in 1983. The film was produced by Lenfilm Studio and Pervoe Tvorcheskoe Obedinenie. Its estimated budget was $8,000,000.

== Distribution ==
Distributors include:

- Artkino Pictures (1988) (Argentina) (theatrical)
- International Film Exchange (IFEX) (1987) (USA) (theatrical) (subtitled)
- Nihonkai Eiga (1989) (Japan) (theatrical)
- Niwa Film (1989) (Japan) (theatrical)
- Polfilm (1988) (Sweden) (theatrical)
- I.V.C. (2011) (Japan) (DVD) (Aleksey German DVD-BOX)

== Technical specifications ==
- Runtime: 1 hr 40 min (100 min)
- Sound: mix mono
- Color: black and white | color
- Aspect ratio: 1.37 : 1
- Laboratory: Lenfilm, Leningrad, Soviet Union
- Film length: 2,719 m (Sweden)
- Negative format: 35 mm
- Cinematographic process: spherical
- Printed film format: 35 mm

== Reception ==
My Friend Ivan Lapshin has an approval rating of 83% on review aggregator website Rotten Tomatoes, based on 6 reviews, and an average rating of 7/10. Jeremy Heilman (MovieMartyr.com): "As "fifty years and five blocks" would imply, memory is viewed here as something slippery; almost tangible yet just out of reach."

According to Tony Wood,

These are people whose faith in the future remains intact, but whose betrayal is imminent. German has said that his main aim was to convey a sense of the period, to depict as faithfully as possible the material conditions and human preoccupations of Soviet Russia on the eve of the Great Purge. It is for this world, for these people that the narrator struggles to declare his love—unconditional, knowing how flawed that world was, and how tainted the future would be. German compared the film to the work of Chekhov, and one can see in it a similar tenderness for the suffering and absurdity of its characters.

Walter Goodman of The New York Times wrote, "Beneath the camouflage of the look of time past, Ivan is makeshift melodrama."

Laura Clifford of Reeling Reviews said, "The film is challenging, German playing with time, film stocks and shooting styles, his cinema fractured to give the abstract impression of distant memories...once what German's trying to do sinks in, Lapshin becomes a potent symbol of the Stalinist era."

Ángel Fernández-Santos of El Pais (Spain) wrote, "A beautiful and complex film. [Full Review in Spanish]"

A New York Times article said: “Scene after scene, shot for the most part in the sepia of old photographs, catches the poverty and confusion of a hard time – the crowded apartment, the beat-up cars, the dreary town and its shabbily dressed people, the outbursts of desperation and nuttiness.” “In his treatment of a troupe of actors and some musicians jangling along on a flag-festooned little trolley, the director seems to have picked up some tricks from Fellini, but the spirit is very different.” “‘'We'll clear the land of scum and build an orchard’' – was taken by the Kremlin as a dangerous piece of irony.”

== Awards ==
- Locarno International Film Festival 1986 - Winner of the Ernest Artaria Award

== Trivia ==
- The 'Urka' (Criminal) personage who stabs Khanin and then later is shot and killed by Ivan Lapshin was played not by a professional actor, but by a real criminal. Aleksey German made this decision to add more realism to these scenes.
- This film was shot in the early 1980s, but was not released until the perestroika reforms because it took an ironic look at Soviet idealism.
- Nikolay Gubenko auditioned for the role of Ivan Lapshin, yet the director chose to work with Andrei Boltnev because "there was some sort of 'doomed' quality about him – it was clear he'd be shot and killed".
- Shot in 1983, this movie was not released until 1985.
- The film was based on novellas written by the director Aleksei German's father Iurii P. German (1910-1967).
