= Yuri German =

Soviet writer, screenwriter, playwright, and journalist

- Born: Yuri Pavlovich German; April 4, 1910; Riga, Russian Empire
- Died: January 16, 1967 (aged 56); Leningrad, Soviet Union

Yuri Pavlovich German (Russian: Ю́рий Па́влович Ге́рман) (April 4 [O.S. March 22] 1910 – January 16, 1967) was a Soviet and Russian writer, playwright, screenwriter, and journalist.

== Life ==
German was born in Riga (then part of the Russian Empire) and accompanied his father, an artillery officer, during the Civil War. He graduated from high school in Kursk and studied at the Technical School of Performing Arts in Leningrad in 1929. At age 17, he wrote the novel Rafael iz parikmakherskoi (Raphael of the barbershop), published in 1928, but did not consider himself a professional writer until he published the novel Vstuplenie (Entry), which met with the approval of Maxim Gorky, in 1931.

In 1936, together with director Sergei Gerasimov, he wrote the screenplay for the movie Semero smelykh (The courageous seven), about researchers in the Arctic; among his other screenplays were Pirogov (1947) and Belinsky (1951), both directed by Grigori Kozintsev, and Delo Rumyantseva (The Rumyantsev case, 1955), directed by Iosif Kheifits.

During World War II, German was a war correspondent for TASS and the Soviet Information Bureau with the Northern Fleet. He spent the entire war in the north; from Arkhangelsk he often flew to Murmansk or Kandalaksha, living in the Arctic for months on end, traveling to the front, visiting forward positions, and spending time on the warships of the Northern Fleet. During this time he wrote essays and articles for TASS, and still found time for short stories and novels. During the war he wrote the short novels Bi kheppi! (Be happy!), Attestat (The certificate), Studyonoe more (The frozen sea), Daleko na Severe (The far north) and the plays Za zdorov'e togo, kto v puti (To the health of the man on the road) and Beloe more (White Sea). He was a member of the Communist Party from 1958.

After the war he wrote a historical novel about the era of Peter the Great, Rossiya molodaya (Young Russia, 1952). From his novels and short stories his son Aleksei German made the films Proverka na dorogakh (Trial on the road, or road check, from the novel Operatsiya "S Novym godom") and Moi drug Ivan Lapshin (My Friend Ivan Lapshin), and Semyon Aranovich made the film Torpedonostsy (Torpedo bombers).

German died in Leningrad and was buried at the Bogoslovskoe Cemetery.

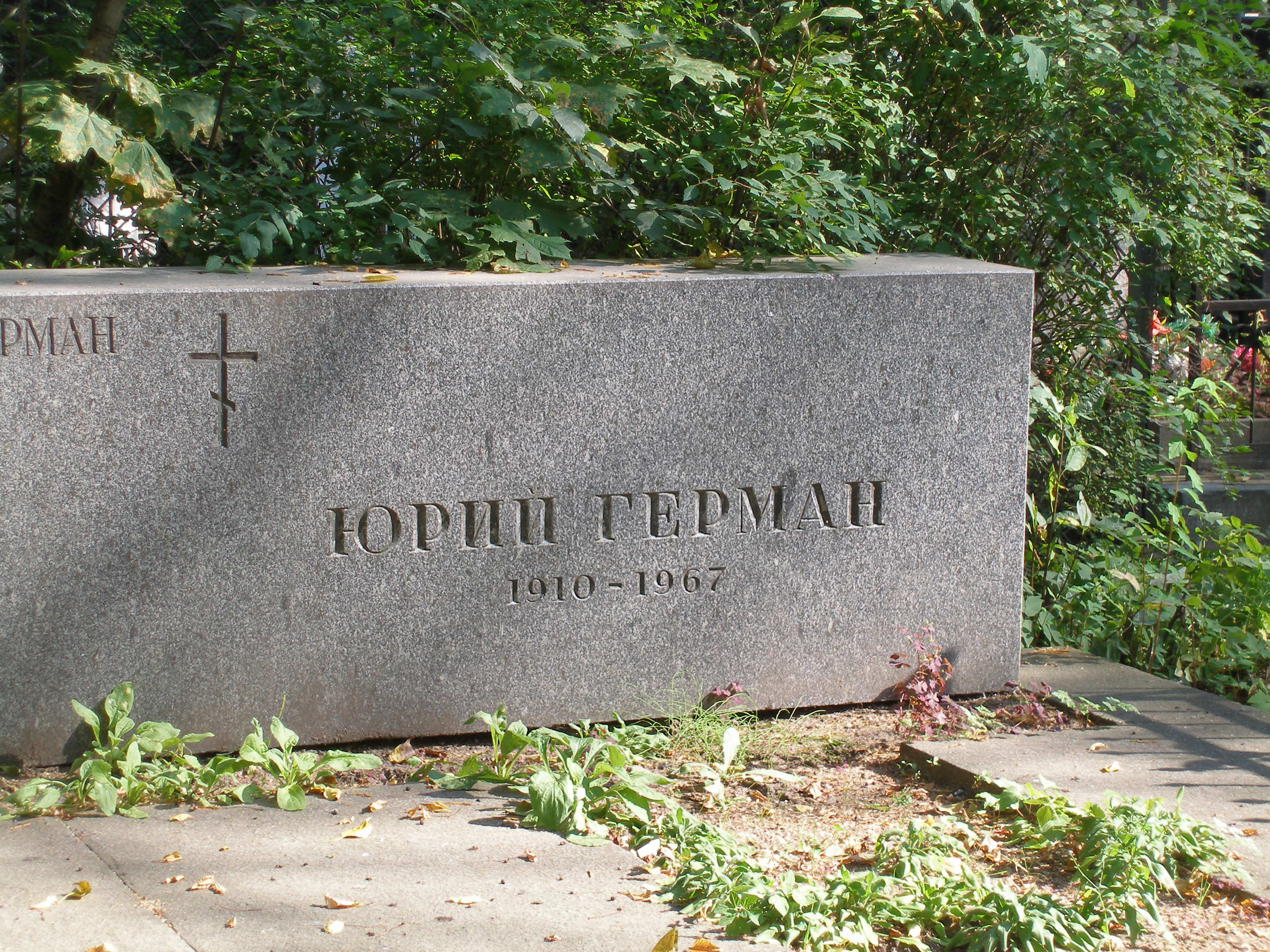
German's tomb at the Bogoslovskoe cemetery.

== Work ==
Richard Stites writes:

His best-known work, Ivan Lapshin (1937), was a police novel in a provincial setting whose main theme was the integration of criminals into society through order and labor. In this sense it resembles old bandit tales in which outlaws are reintegrated into society by colluding with the authorities. The novel incorporates a vision of collectivity (the policemen live in a commune), rationalism, culture, and social tranquility unperturbed by the black discord of crime. For good measure, Lapshin acts as mentor to his junior colleague. All of this is captured, with a twist, in the brilliant film version, My Friend, Ivan Lapshin made by the author's son, Alexei German in the 1980s.

Alexander Werth writes, "His novels, many of them wartime novels with good plots and full of adventure, were unusual in Russia and, therefore, enormously popular. I never thought Yuri German a truly great writer. But he was a man of great moral courage and infinite goodness."
