= Presumption of Innocence (film) =

- Russian: Презумпция невиновности
- Directed by: Yevgeny Tatarsky
- Written by: Arkadiy Tigay
- Starring: Lyubov Polishchuk; Stanislav Sadalskiy; Vasiliy Funtikov; Leonid Kuravlyov; Yuriy Bogatyryov
- Cinematography: Yuri Veksler
- Music by: Aleksandr Zhurbin
- Release date: 1988
- Running time: 88 minute
- Country: Soviet Union
- Language: Russian

Presumption of Innocence (Russian: Презумпция невиновности) is a 1988 Soviet crime comedy film directed by Yevgeny Tatarsky.

The film tells about the famous singer who loses a jacket with a passport on the train. Two stowaways appear to be police officers and try to help her.

== Plot ==
After a concert, a famous singer boards a train for her tour abroad. Amid the bustle of boarding, some intoxicated Finnish tourists briefly wander into her compartment and quickly leave. Soon, the singer realizes her jacket is missing, along with her passport—a crucial document for her international tour. She informs her manager, Ozeran, who initially laughs it off, but when he learns the passport was in the jacket, he becomes serious and involves the tour director, Grigory Stepanovich, in the search. Grigory first chastises the train attendant, Lidochka, who insists that no theft could have occurred because their train boasts an exemplary youth brigade. Bondarev, the train supervisor, decides to call in the police at the next station for assistance.

Meanwhile, two doctors, Pyotr Nikitich and Misha, en route to a seminar in Leningrad, are struggling to find tickets. Desperate, they attempt to negotiate with train staff, hoping to sit in the corridor if need be. Coincidentally, they board the same train, where a conductor mistakes them for the awaited police officers. Initially confused, Misha convinces Pyotr to play along as detectives, seeing no other way to stay on board. What follows is a comedic sequence where Misha, reveling in his role, “interrogates” members of the touring group, uncovering personal dramas and minor scandals. Through the process, they learn that Ozeran is traveling on a falsified business permit to secretly visit his opera singer lover in Leningrad, and Grigory Stepanovich, despite his credentials, reveals himself as a petty schemer who owes his position to drinking sessions with superiors. Additionally, Lidochka’s “exemplary” brigade has a stowaway: a young man named Slava hiding in her compartment.

As the faux investigation unfolds, Misha declares everyone a potential suspect, while Pyotr, guided by his principles, reminds him about the presumption of innocence and the risks of jumping to conclusions. Eventually, their deception is exposed when the train supervisor demands their credentials, revealing they are not police officers. Just then, the missing jacket turns up beneath a sleeping, inebriated Finnish passenger, ending the farcical search.

== Cast ==
- Lyubov Polishchuk as Zoya Bolotnikova
- Stanislav Sadalskiy as Leonid Borisovich Ozeran
- Vasiliy Funtikov as Misha Sovchi
- Leonid Kuravlyov as Bondarev
- Yuriy Bogatyryov as Kozinets
- Nikolai Pastukhov as Pyotr Nikitich
- Irina Rakshina as Lidiya Semyonovna
- Oleg Garkusha as Slava
- Elena Kovaleva as Maid
- Lyubov Malinovskaya as Nedyalkova
