= Confrontation (miniseries) =

- Written by: Yulian Semyonov
- Directed by: Semyon Aranovich
- Starring: Oleg Basilashvili; Andrei Boltnev
- Music by: Alexander Knaifel
- Country of origin: Soviet Union
- Original language: Russian

Production
- Cinematography: Valery Fedosov
- Running time: 392 min.
- Production company: Lenfilm

Original release
- Release: 10 November – 14 November 1985

Confrontation or (Russian: Противостояние, romanized: Protivostoyanie) is a 1985 Soviet six-part television film directed by Semyon Aranovich based on the novel by Yulian Semyonov.

== Plot ==
Two parallel storylines unfold in the film. One takes place in the late 1970s in the USSR and the other during the Great Patriotic War on the territory of Poland and Nazi Germany.

A dismembered human corpse is found in the bushes near the road leading to the airport of Nardyn. Police colonel Vladislav Nikolaevich Kostenko comes from Moscow to investigate this heinous and unusual crime. Soon the taxi driver Grigoriy Milinko gets linked to the murder. But thanks to the investigation of the police major Kardava, assistant of Kostenko, it turns out that the real Grigoriy Milinko, Marine of the Red Army, was killed and dismembered in the area of Wrocław in 1945. Fingerprints of "Milinko" found in Nardyme are sent to East Germany, where in the Berlin archive is found data on the real culprit.

This is Nikolai Ivanovich Krotov, a traitor who in the summer of 1941 defected to the German side. In an effort to prove his loyalty to the Nazis, he even carried by himself the wounded political leader George Kozel who was subsequently shot. He works as a provocateur. Due to his denunciations a large group of Soviet prisoners of war who have been trying to organize an underground resistance in the concentration camp is shot. Krotov gets released. German command sent him to the hospital where he successfully undergoes experimental treatment for stuttering. Then he trains in the special commando school Abwehr and then is flung into the rear areas of the USSR with special scouting and sabotage assignments. Soon the traitor tries to rob a German female jeweler with whom he resided and is sent to a concentration camp. After one year of imprisonment German Security Service send him to the secret and dirty assignment, all crimes of Krotov forgotten.

In 1945 as part of Vlasov's Army Krotov is involved in the defense of Breslau but then deserts. When he kills Grigoriy Milinko and steals his documents and military uniform, Krotov enters the ranks of the Red Army, and after the war goes to the northern regions of the USSR, to Nardyn, where finds a job as a taxi driver.

Years pass. Krotov, knowing that sooner or later he will be exposed, is preparing to escape to the West. But the traitor is aiming to not run away empty-handed but bearing gold. Krotov finds an accomplice, Anna Petrova, part of an organization in charge of gold mines, and begins illegal prospecting. Later they kill a certain Michael Gonchakov, unsuccessfully trying to collect a huge gold nugget belonging to him and run away from Nardyn. Upon learning that Petrova is pregnant, Krotov does not hesitate to kill and dismember his former mistress. Then, with the help of relatives in Smolensk, the traitor robs a jewelry store. Now Krotov, having accumulated enough gold and jewels in his opinion, is ready for the last break to a foreign country.

But the police is on the track of the traitor and murderer. Kostenko and Kardava stalk Krotov in Adler. Realizing that he is surrounded on all sides, Krotov grabs a hostage and tries to hijack a plane. By only the courage and professionalism of the special forces group the savage criminal has been stopped and arrested.

== Cast ==
- Oleg Basilashvili – Vladislav Nikolaevich Kostenko, police colonel
- Andrei Boltnev – Nikolai Ivanovich Krotov, "Grigoriy Milinko", traitor, former saboteur and officer of Russian Liberation Army
- Yury Kuznetsov –Alexey Ivanovich Zhukov, police major, head of criminal investigation of the city Nardyn
- Murman Jinoria – Revaz Kardava, police major, Kostenko's assistant
- Natalya Sayko – Anna Kuzminichna Petrova, Krotov's mistress
- Viktor Gogolev – George Kozel Sr.
- Vladimir Parmenov – Zagibalov
- Elvira Druzhinina – Zagibalova
- Aleksandr Kazakov – Spiridon Kalinovich Deryabin (voice by Vadim Yakovlev)
- Olga Semyonova – Kira Koroleva, journalist
- Aleksandr Filippenko – Roman Kirillovich Zhuravlev, veterinarian
- Vera Bykov-Pizhel – Diana Savelevna Zhuravleva (Kuzmina), Zhuravlev's wife
- Olga Samoshina – Dora Sergeevna Kobozeva, "Dora the Bulldozer"
- Valeriy Filonov – Grigoriev, Gonchakov's friend, cook
- Alya Nikulina – Grigoriev's wife
- Oleg Palmov – Sakov, Grigoriev's friend
- Yelizaveta Nikishchikhina – Shchukina, Anna Petrova's neighbor, biologist
- Stanislav Sadalsky – Gennady Zipkin, taxi driver
- Talgat Nigmatulin – Urazbaev, a police captain in Kokand
- Galina Makarova – Claudia Egorovna Efremova, Anna Petrova's aunt
- Kote Makharadze – Sergo Suhishvili, police colonel in Abkhazia
- Sergey Bekhterev – Alex Kirillovich Lvov, Anna Petrova's former friend from Adler
- Vladimir Golovin – Ernest Vasilievich Lebedev, Krotov's former friend and former officer of Russian Liberation Army
- Vytautas Paukste – Paul Keller, a military historian from GDR
- Alexey Buldakov – director of taxi company in Nardyn
- Andrey Smolyakov – the real Grigoriy Milinko who was killed by Krotov (voice by Sergei Parshin)

== Filming ==
- The film "Confrontation" was the last work of actor Talgat Nigmatulin who was killed shortly after the shooting.
- The city "Nardyn" (in which the events of the film begin) does not really exist. Under this name the city of Magadan is shown.
- The role of the journalist Kira Koroleva was played by Olga, youngest daughter of the film's screenwriter Yulian Semyonov.
- The scene featuring the capture of an aircraft was filmed in the airport of Novorossiysk.
- The picture is based on real events which occurred in the mid-1960s in Magadan. The taxi driver Gacko killed the miner Melchakov, took his letter of credit and after quitting his job left with his friend Petrova. In another city the murderer received Melchakov's money in a savings bank.
- In one of the episodes set in 1980 the song "The Grass Near the House" by the band Zemlyane is played, which actually was released on radio and television only in the year 1983. In the second and fourth series the song "Snow Whirls" by VIA Plamya is played which was written in 1981 and was first performed in the program "Song of the Year" only in 1982.
- In one of the episodes the street "Komsomol" in Oryol is specified. In fact the city does not have a street with this name.
- The journalist Michael Rosenfeld, mentioned by colonel Kostenko in conversation with journalist Koroleva, did not die with Arkady Gaidar at Kaniv but almost a year later, near Kharkiv.

== Differences between the film and the book ==
- At the end of the book Krotov manages to capture a passenger aircraft, but pilots land the plane on "a US military base in a neighboring country", which is in fact hastily equipped on the USSR territory; the killer is arrested there. In the film the ending is changed to a more realistic one: while the police are distracting the criminal with negotiations, the special forces soldiers enter the cabin of the aircraft and disarm Krotov on the spot.
- Colonel Kostenko is named Vladislav Nikolaevich in the film. In the novel he is called Vladislav Romanovich.
- The name of Kostenko's assistant is Kardava in the film while in the book he is Tadava.
- In the book the action begins in the fictional town of "Magaran". In the film "Magaran" was changed to "Nardyn".
- Former Vlasovite Lebedev commits suicide in the film. In the novel after talking to Kostenko he no longer appears in the plot.
- Gonchakov's body which is hidden in a bag, is found by Grigoriy Kozel, the father of Krotov's brother-soldier in the film. In the book the body is found by Junior Researcher Alex Krabovsky.
- The killed miner is called Gonchakov in the film. In the book - Minchakov.
