= Alpine Ballad =

Soviet movie

- Russian: Альпийская баллада
- Directed by: Boris Stepanov
- Written by: Vasil Bykaŭ
- Starring: Lyubov Rumyantseva; Stanislav Lyubshin
- Cinematography: Anatoliy Zabolotsky
- Edited by: Zinaida Verevkina
- Music by: Vladimir Cherednichenko
- Production company: Belarusfilm
- Release date: 1965
- Running time: 86 min.
- Country: Soviet Union
- Language: Russian

Alpine Ballad (Russian: Альпийская баллада, romanized: Alpiyskaya ballada) is a 1965 Soviet romantic drama film directed by Boris Stepanov.

== Plot ==
The film takes place during the Great Patriotic War. It tells the story of prisoners of war who work at a factory in the Alps and decide to escape.

== Cast ==
- Lyubov Rumyantseva as Julia Novelli
- Stanislav Lyubshin as Ivan Tereshka
- Aleksey Kotrelev as Madman
- Vladimir Belokurov as Austrian man
- Antonina Bendova as Postman
- Yuri Yurchenko as Golodai
- Gennadiy Vasilevskiy as Zandler
- Galina Makarova as Pelagia
- Vyacheslav Kubarev as S.S. Man
- Aleksei Nesterov as Srebnikov
