= Summer Impressions of Planet Z =

- Directed by: Evgeniy Markovsky
- Written by: Yuri Tomin
- Starring: Arnas Katinas; Giedrius Puskunigis; Sergey Shakurov
- Cinematography: Konstantin Remishevsky
- Music by: Sergei Slonimsky
- Production company: Belarusfilm
- Release date: 1986
- Running time: 120 minutes
- Country: Soviet Union
- Language: Russian

Summer Impressions of Planet Z (Russian: Летние впечатления о планете Z, romanized: Letniye vpechatleniya o planete Z) is a 1986 Soviet two-part science-fiction film directed by Evgeniy Markovsky. Yuri Tomin wrote the script loosely based on his 1979 book Carousel Over the City ("Incident in Kuleminsk").

== Plot ==
Felix, a 12-year-old boy from outer space, during the summer holidays gets admitted into a summer children's sports camp. Few people know in the camp that Felix is not there by chance, and a few days ago he was created in a school laboratory because a space intellect sent him as an agent to planet earth to study humans. He is assisted by an ordinary boy Boris and a teacher who explains Felix local traditions and customs.

== Cast ==
- Arnas Katinas – Felix Schastlivtsev, an alien
- Giedrius Puskunigis – Borya Kulikov
- Sergey Shakurov – Aleksey Pavlovich Mukhin, teacher of physics
- Vadim Gems – Eduard Mikhailovich, hairdresser—detective
- Galina Makarova – Marivanna, cleaner
- Dmitry Matveyev – Vasyushkin
- Dmitry Kharatyan – Andrei Morkovkin, soloist of the group "Astronauts", author and director of the rock opera "14 floors of solitude"
- Irina Efremova – Lilja Librarian
- Irina Zhangarova – doctor
- Dmitry Iosifov – drummer of the group "Astronauts"
- Dmitry Taradaikin
- Konstantin Remishevsky
- Igor Taradaikin – Kapustin
- Sergey Biryukov – Serega Kulikov, brother of Boris
- Rostislav Shmyrev – seller
- Zhenya Tumilovich – baby Felix
- Kolya Markovsky – young Felix
