= Galina Makarova =

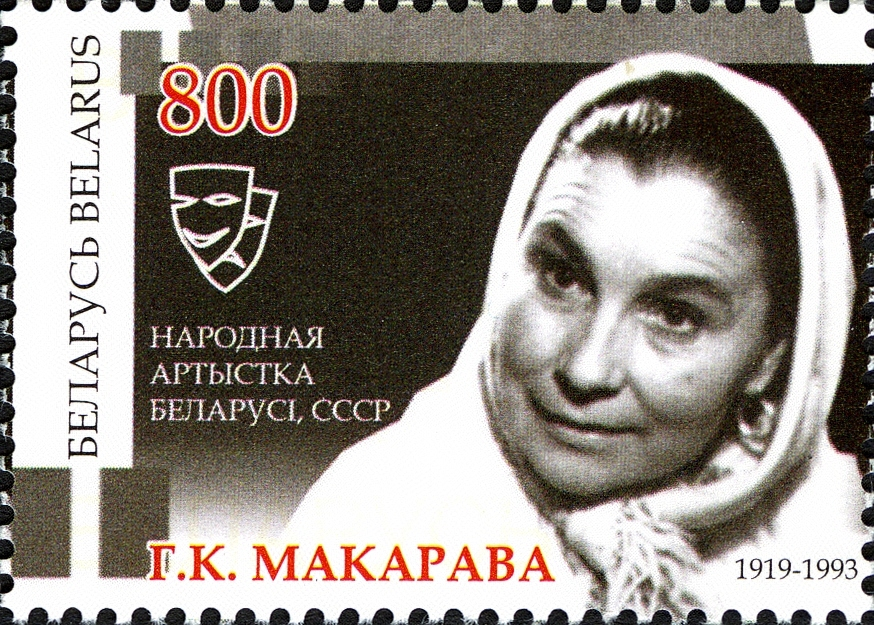
2009 stamp of Belarus

Galina Klimentevna Makarova (real name Agatha; Belarusian: Галіна Кліменцьеўна Макарава, Russian: Галина Климентьевна Мака́рова; December 27, 1919 — September 28, 1993) was a Soviet and Belarusian stage and film actress. People's Artist of the USSR (1980).

She was born in the Starobin village (now Salihorsk District, Minsk Region, Belarus).

The first success on the stage came to her in 1954.

She began to play in movies in 1958. Her first star role in film was the role of Aleksandra Matveyevna Gromova in the film Widows in 1976.

Galina Makarova died on September 28, 1993, at her dacha near Minsk (other sources say she died in Moscow). She was buried in Minsk on the Vostochnoye Cemetery.

== Filmography ==
- 1965 — Alpine Ballad as Pelageya
- 1966 — East Corridor as woman behind table (uncredited)
- 1976 — Widows as Aleksandra Matveyevna Gromova
- 1978 — Young Wife as grandma Agasha
- 1983 — White Dew as Matruna
- 1985 — Do Not Marry, Girls as granny "Bushtit"
- 1985 — Confrontation as Klavdiya Yegorovna Yefremova
- 1985 — Farewell of Slavianka as Anna Ivanovna
- 1986 — Coasts in the Mist as Avdotya Yefimovna
- 1986 — Summer Impressions of Planet Z as Marivanna the janitor
- 1987 — The Garden of Desires as grandma
- 1992 — I Hope for You as Matveyevna
