= Ragin (film) =

- Russian: Рагин
- Directed by: Kirill Serebrennikov
- Written by: Anton Chekhov; Inna Tkachenko; Mikhail Ugarov; Dmitriy Zverkov
- Produced by: Aleksei Guskov
- Starring: Aleksei Guskov; Aleksandr Galibin; Dmitry Mulyar; Natalya Nikulenko; Zoya Buryak
- Cinematography: Artur Gimpel
- Edited by: Kirk von Heflin
- Music by: Alexei Aigui
- Release date: 2004
- Countries: Russia; Austria
- Language: Russian

Ragin (Russian: Рагин) is a 2004 Russian-Austrian drama film directed by Kirill Serebrennikov.

== Plot ==
The film takes place in Russia in the early twentieth century in a small provincial town. The plot focuses on doctor managing a county hospital. Suddenly he receives an interesting report in which the young psychiatrist Himmelsdorf demonstrates a method of treating psychosis and Ragin decides to use this method in his work.

== Cast ==
- Aleksei Guskov as Ragin
- Aleksandr Galibin as Gromov
- Dmitry Mulyar as Khobotov
- Natalya Nikulenko as Anna Ivanovna
- Zoya Buryak as Sanya
- Vladimir Krasnov as Sergei Sergeyevich
- Vitaliy Khaev as Nikita
- Sergei Parshin as Toptun
- Sergey Bekhterev as The Boy
- Yuriy Itskov as Moyseyka
