= Summer Trip to the Sea =

- Russian: Летняя поездка к морю
- Directed by: Semyon Aranovich
- Written by: Yuri Klepikov
- Starring: Igor Fokin; Anatoliy Gorin; Aleksandr Kurennoy; Viktor Proskurin; Nikolai Skorobogatov; Andrey Zotov
- Cinematography: Vladimir Ilin
- Edited by: Tamara Belyayeva
- Music by: Oleg Karavaychuk
- Release date: 1978
- Country: Soviet Union
- Language: Russian

Summer Trip to the Sea (Russian: Летняя поездка к морю, romanized: Letnyaya poyezdka k moryu) is a 1978 Soviet war drama film directed by Semyon Aranovich.

The film tells about students who went to the islands of Novaya Zemlya in 1942 to equip food bases for sailors and how Germans appear on the island.

The film is based on the original draft of Nikolay Vurdov’s novella Robinsons of the Cold Island and was shot in an unusually documentary-like style for its time.

== Plot ==
Arkhangelsk, 1942. At the onset of summer, a group of schoolchildren embarks on an expedition to the shores of Novaya Zemlya to complete a special assignment. Their mission is to collect as many bird eggs as possible from the island's bustling bird colonies. These eggs are meant to supplement food supplies for emergency provisions being established to aid stranded sailors and others struggling to survive in the harsh Arctic environment during wartime.

Carrying essential goods, the children work to build survival depots on the frigid island. Unbeknownst to them, their arrival coincides with the crash landing of a German pilot following an air battle. Shortly afterward, a group of Nazi soldiers arrives at their camp, searching for the downed pilot. The leader of the children's brigade does his best to avoid conflict, attempting to convince the Germans that it is merely a harmless youth camp. However, tensions escalate when a teenager, whose father was killed in the war, reacts emotionally, leading to a tragic incident in which the commander is shot by one of the Germans.

== Cast ==
- Igor Fokin
- Anatoliy Gorin
- Aleksandr Kurennoy
- Viktor Proskurin
- Nikolai Skorobogatov
- Andrey Zotov
