= Widows (1976 film) =

- Russian: Вдовы
- Directed by: Sergey Mikaelyan
- Written by: Yuli Dunsky; Valeri Frid
- Produced by: Vladimir Semenets
- Starring: Galina Makarova; Galina Skorobogatova
- Cinematography: Vladimir Chumak
- Edited by: Izolda Golovko
- Production company: Lenfilm
- Release date: 1976
- Running time: 90 min.
- Country: Soviet Union
- Language: Russian

Widows (Russian: Вдовы, romanized: Vdovy) is a 1976 Soviet drama film directed by Sergey Mikaelyan.

== Plot ==
The film tells about two elderly widows who live in the same house. They are united not only by tragedy, but also by common concern, namely the grave of two unknown soldiers, which they have been guarding for over 30 years. And suddenly the managers of their district decide to turn the grave into a memorial.

== Cast ==
- Galina Makarova as Shura
- Galina Skorobogatova as Liza
- Gennadi Lozhkin as Boris
- Borislav Brondukov as Galkin
- Yuri Kayurov as Krotov
- Raisa Maksimova as Alla
- Mikhail Pogorzhelsky as Kireev
- Vladimir Pitsek as Alla's husband
- Larisa Chikurova as Nadya Kharitonova
- Yuriy Dubrovin as Voronkov
