= Stanislav Sadalsky =

Soviet and Russian actor

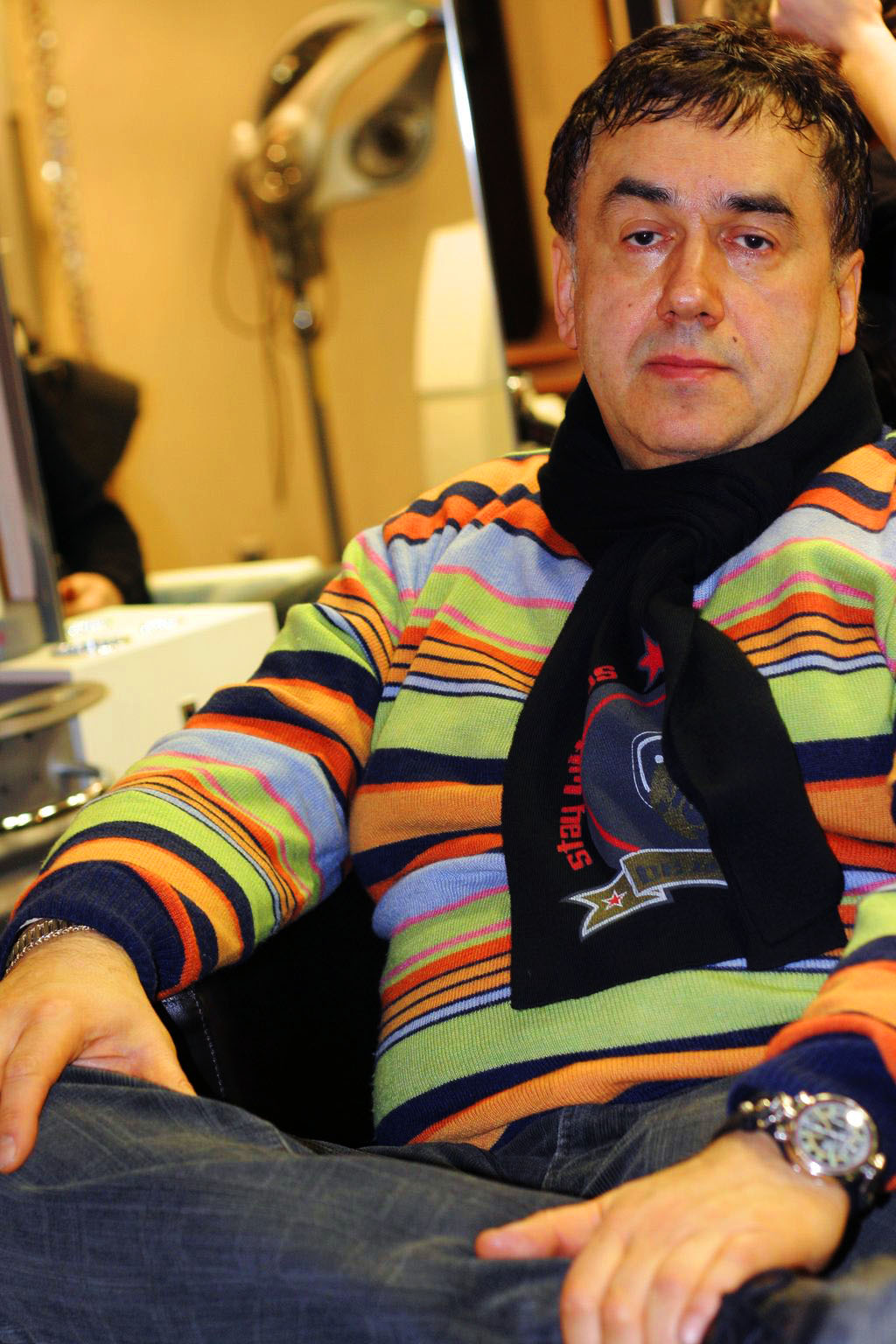
Sadalsky in 2008

Stanislav Yurievich Sadalsky (Russian: Станисла́в Ю́рьевич Сада́льский; born 8 August 1951 in Chuvashia) is a Soviet and Russian actor.

== Selected filmography ==
- The Twelve Chairs (Двенадцать стульев, 1971) as Fireman in the theater "Columbus"
- The Meeting Place Cannot Be Changed (Место встречи изменить нельзя, 1979) as Kostya "Kirpich" Saprykin, pickpocket
- Say a Word for the Poor Hussar (О бедном гусаре замолвите слово, 1981) as cornet Alexei Pletnev
- Station for Two (Вокзал для двоих, 1982) as man with a carburetor
- Torpedo Bombers (Торпедоносцы, 1983) as Dmitrienko
- White Dew (Белые Росы, 1983) as Mikhail Kisel
- Confrontation (Противостояние, 1985) as Gennady Zipkin, taxi driver
- The Lady with the parrot (Дама с попугаем, 1988) as Gennady Fedorov
- Presumption of Innocence (Презумпция невиновности, 1988) as Leonid Borisovich Ozeran
- Two Arrows. Stone Age Detective (Две стрелы. Детектив каменного века, 1989) as Eloquent
- Promised Heaven (Небеса обетованные, 1991) as photographer at the wedding
- Act, Manya! (Действуй, Маня!, 1991) as Vasya
- To whom will God send (На кого Бог пошлёт, 1994) as Pavel Hlyuzdin
- Deadly Force (Убойная сила, 2000, 2003) as Anatoly Lvovich
- My Fair Nanny (Моя прекрасная няня, 2004) as Probkin
