= Aleksandr Filippenko =

Soviet and Russian actor

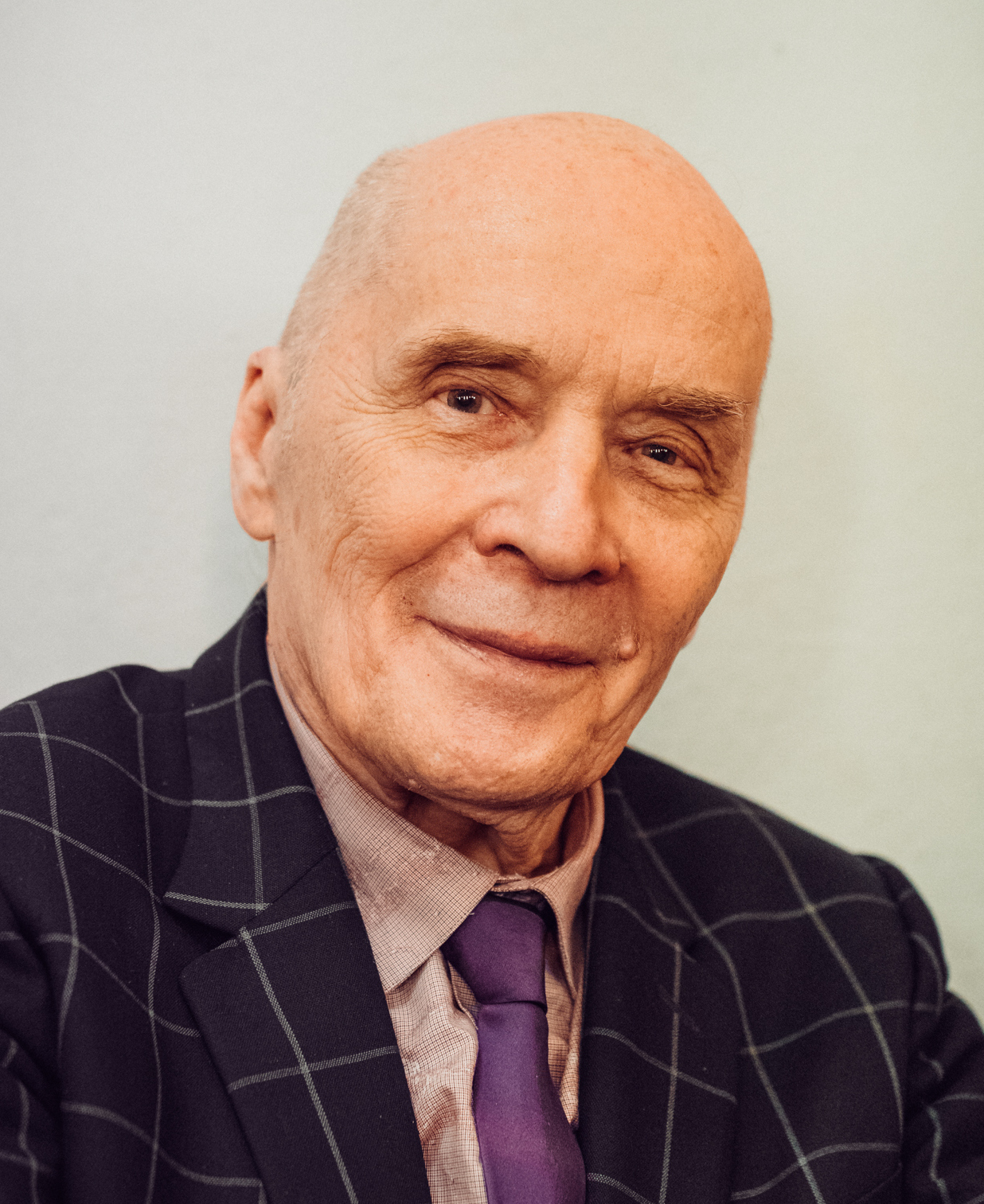
- Filippenko in 2023
- Born: Aleksandr Georgievich Filippenko; September 2, 1944 (age 81); Moscow, Soviet Union
- Occupation: Actor
- Years active: 1964–present

Aleksandr Georgievich Filippenko (Russian: Александр Георгиевич Филиппенко; born September 2, 1944) is a Soviet and Russian actor, People's Artist of Russia (2000).

== Biography ==
He was born in Moscow. His parents moved to Alma-Ata, Kazakhstan where he graduated from high school. Later on he entered MIPT where he took active part in MFTI KVN team. The first time he appeared on stage at the MSU Variety Studio Our Home in a stage adaptation of Kersanov's Story of Tsar Emelian. Since 1969 Filippenko was a key member of Taganka Theater. In 1970 he entered Boris Shchukin Theatre Institute and graduated with honors. In 1975 he started working at Vakhtangov Theater where he took part in famous plays Treaty of Brest-Litovsk (Брестский Мир), Richard III and many others. There he met, worked with and became good friends with director Robert Sturua. Filippenko left Vakhtangov Theater in 1994 and started his own theatrical project "Mono-Duet-Trio". Since 1995 Filippenko is a freelance actor, working in various theatres: in Satirikon theatre playing Claudius and the Ghost in Hamlet, in Et Cetera theatre playing Antonio in The Merchant of Venice, in Tabakerka theatre playing Satin in The Lower Depths, in Mossoveta theatre playing Serebryakov in Chekhov's Uncle Vanya and Batenin/Akimov in Anteroom (Предбанник) by Sergei Yursky. He directs and plays various mono-plays (one man shows) such as One Day in the Life of Ivan Denisovich and Product in Praktika theatre, "Enthusiast's demarche" in Polytheatre and many others based on Russian classical literature.

In May 2022 Filippenko posted a photo of himself on Facebook wearing a vyshyvanka (a Ukrainian embroidered shirt) in protest against the 2022 Russian invasion of Ukraine. Following this Russian theatres started to refuse appearances by Filippenko.

In February 2023 Filippenko's daughter Alexandra told TV Rain that her father had left Russia and was living in Vilnius, Lithuania because of "his position on Russia’s invasion of Ukraine."

=== Family ===
His daughter, Alexandra Filippenko (born 1985 in Moscow), is a Candidate of Sciences, an expert on U.S. domestic politics, and a theatrical producer. She has worked as a research fellow at the Institute for U.S. and Canadian Studies of the Russian Academy of Sciences and is the author of a book on U.S. immigration policy. Filippenko is also active as a political commentator and theatre producer, participating in numerous cultural and civic projects.

== Filmography ==
- Two Prosecutors (2025) as Stepniak
- Patient No. 1 (Пациент No. 1, 2023) as Konstantin Chernenko
- Champion of the World (Чемпион мира, 2021) as Leonid Brezhnev
- Peter the Great: The Testament (Пётр Первый. Завещание, 2011) as Pyotr Andreyevich Tolstoy
- Happy Ending (Счастливый конец, 2010) as Old Dick
- My Fair Nanny (Моя прекрасная няня, 2008) as Vladimir Prutkovsky
- One Night of Love (Одна ночь любви, 2008) as Prince Illarion Zabelin
- Attack on Leningrad (Ленинград, 2007) as Arkatov
- Conspiracy (Заговор, 2007) as Dmitry Kosorotov, prozektor
- Asiris Nuna (Азирис Нуна, 2006) as Pharaoh Nemenkhotep IV
- Adjutants of Love (Адьютанты любви, 2005) as Boris Kuragin
- Brezhnev (Брежнев, 2005) as General Georgy Tsinyov
- The Master and Margarita (Мастер и Маргарита, 2005) as Azazello
- Poor Nastya (Бедная Настя, 2003) as Andrey Platonovich Zabaluev
- Investigation Led by Experts (Следствие ведут ЗнаТоКи, 2002) as Landyshev
- Lady for a Day (Леди на день, 2002) as Count Alfonso Romero
- The Romanovs: An Imperial Family (Романовы. Венценосная семья, 2000) as Vladimir Lenin
- The Career of Arturo Ui (Карьера Артура Уи, 1996) as Arturo Ui
- The Master and Margarita (Мастер и Маргарита, 1994) as Korovyev
- The Inner Circle (Ближний круг, 1991) as Major Khitrov (voiced by Boris Bystrov)
- Hard to Be a God (Трудно быть богом, 1989) as Don Reba
- To Kill a Dragon (Убить дракона, 1988) as blacksmith-gunsmith
- Visit to Minotaur (Визит к Минотавру, 1987) as Grigory Petrovich Belash, piano tuner
- Battle of Moscow (Битва за Москву, 1985) as Dmitry Pavlov
- Sofia Kovalevskaya (Софья Ковалевская, 1985) as Fyodor Dostoevsky
- Confrontation (Противостояние, 1985) as Roman Kirillovich Zhuravlyov, veterinarian
- Copper Angel (Медный ангел, 1984) as Santillano
- My Friend Ivan Lapshin (Мой друг Иван Лапшин, 1984) as Zanadvorov
- Applause, Applause... (Аплодисменты, аплодисменты..., 1984) as Vadim Petrovich Goncharov, Valeriya's husband
- Start Liquidation (Приступить к ликвидации, 1983) as Andrei Dmitriyevich Blinov "Kopchyonyy", thief in law
- Torpedo Bombers (Торпедоносцы, 1983) as general major of Soviet Air Forces
- The Ballad of the Valiant Knight Ivanhoe (Баллада о доблестном рыцаре Айвенго, 1982) as Wamba the jester
- Resident Return (Возвращение резидента, 1982) as mercenary squad commander
- The Star and Death of Joaquin Murieta (Звезда и смерть Хоакина Мурьеты, 1982) as Death
- Along Unknown Paths (Там, на неведомых дорожках..., 1982) as Koshchei
- Who will pay for Luck? (Кто заплатит за удачу?, 1980) as Konkov
- Bumbarash (Бумбараш, 1971) as White Guard Strigunov
- Attention, Turtle! (Внимание, черепаха!, 1970) as tank commander (uncredited)
- Shine, Shine, My Star (Гори, гори, моя звезда, 1970) as white officer
- I'm His Bride (Я его невеста, 1969) as Vladimir Kharlamov
