= Rafferty (film) =

- Written by: Semyon Nagornyj
- Directed by: Semyon Aranovich
- Starring: Oleg Borisov; Armen Dzhigarkhanyan; Alexander Kaidanovsky
- Music by: Alexander Knaifel
- Country of origin: Soviet Union
- Original language: Russian

Production
- Cinematography: Heinrich Marandzhyan
- Running time: 198 min.
- Production company: Lenfilm

Original release
- Release: 1980

Rafferty or (Russian: Рафферти, romanized: Rafferty) is a Soviet 1980 drama television film directed by Semyon Aranovich and based on the novel by American writer Lionel White.

== Plot ==
The film takes place in the US during the 1960s and 1970s. Jack Rafferty, deputy head of the trade union of transport workers gives testimony before the senate committee on suspicion of corruption. Rafferty has the right to refuse to testify citing the Fifth Amendment to the United States Constitution, but then he will never be elected as chairman of the trade union. Therefore Rafferty decides to take a chance and starts to answer questions of the commission...

Climbing the corporate ladder was a very difficult task for Rafferty; full of "dark" deeds. These included the creation of false trade union committees with the help of his close friend gangster Faricetti, and illegal use of union pension funds for personal enrichment, and using his wife as a shill. Rafferty even exploited his mistress Jill by making her a sexual "gift" to a senior trade unionist.

But the moment of truth comes and in the course of the investigation by the commission all these ugly facts come to light showing the public all the depravity of Rafferty's activities. As a result he becomes totally bankrupt: his wife leaves him with the children (additionally his daughter dies in a car accident), a childhood friend commits suicide and publicly disgraced Jill Hart also escapes, taking with her all of Rafferty's secret savings. But attorney Ames saves the final blow for later. Ames provides a recording of telephone conversations from which it is clear that Rafferty called the police and ratted out his closest friend – Tommy Faricetti. Watching this on TV live Faricetti understands that he is doomed. He faces a third conviction which means that the sentencing will be brief – life imprisonment waits for him. And then Faricetti drives up to the building where the commission is in session and pulls out a machine-gun to finally settle accounts with Rafferty who betrayed him...

== Cast ==
- Oleg Borisov as Jack Rafferty (character based on Jimmy Hoffa)
- Yevgeniya Simonova as Jill Hart, Rafferty's secretary and mistress
- Larisa Malevannaya as Martha, Rafferty's wife
- Armen Dzhigarkhanyan as Tommy Faricetti, gangster, Rafferty's friend
- Alexander Kaidanovsky as Ames, attorney (character based on Robert F. Kennedy)
- Vytautas Paukštė as Hedn Bosworth, a businessman, Rafferty's childhood friend
- Konstantin Adashevsky as Sam Farrow, Head of the Trade Union of Transport Workers
- Vladimir Zeldin as US Senator Fellows, chairman of the Senate Commission
- Alex Resser as Mort Kaufman, Rafferty's lawyer (voice by Zinovy Gerdt)
- Yuri Strenga as Francis McNamara, Faricetti's lawyer (voice by Igor Efimov)
- Gediminas Karka as Martha's father
- Izil Zabludovskiy as Philip
- Marina Levtova as Ann, Rafferty's daughter
- Sergey Vlasov as Eddie, Rafferty's son
- Aleksei German as reporter
- Vasili Korzun as Uelleson, member of the Senate Commission
- Nikolay Marton as Tilden, member of the Senate Commission
- Yuri Rodionov as journalist
