= ...And Other Officials =

1976 film by Semyon Aranovich

- Russian: ...И другие официальные лица
- Directed by: Semyon Aranovich
- Written by: Aleksandr Gorokhov
- Starring: Lev Durov; Aleksandr Galibin; Anatoly Grachyov; Gunnar Kilgas; Lev Kruglyy
- Cinematography: Genrikh Marandzhyan
- Music by: Oleg Karavaychuk
- Production company: Lenfilm
- Release date: November 8, 1976
- Running time: 89 min.
- Country: Soviet Union
- Language: Russian

...And Other Officials (Russian: ...И другие официальные лица, romanized: ...I drugie ofitsialnye litsa) is a 1976 Soviet drama film directed by Semyon Aranovich.

A trade agreement between a Western oil company and Soviet industrialists may not take place. The head of the western delegation suddenly began to demand the replacement of a representative of the USSR.

== Plot ==
Konstantin Pavlovich Ivanov is the head of a Soviet foreign trade organization, tasked with negotiating a contract for the export of pumps with an international corporation. However, before negotiations begin, the head of the corporation, Mr. Clark, requests Ivanov's removal from the talks due to a longstanding personal and professional conflict from their time working in Africa twenty years prior. In response, Ivanov's deputy is appointed to lead the delegation, while Ivanov himself is reassigned to a lower position in Africa. This demotion deeply affects him, and he faces additional struggles within his family: he is divorced, feels distant from his son, and hesitates to introduce his new love, translator Inna Vladimirovna, to his family.

While in Africa, Ivanov gradually finds peace and regains his confidence, using his experience to resolve a complex situation. Upon his return to Moscow, he steps in to help the stalled negotiations. Clark initially offers an unfair price, suggesting that the deal should be accepted "out of goodwill" for the sake of diplomatic relations. Ivanov, however, visits the manufacturing plant and discovers a unique advantage of the Soviet pumps—they can handle a wide range of substances, from water to heavy oil. Realizing Clark's motives are purely business-driven, not political, Ivanov successfully concludes the negotiations. His family life also begins to improve. In the final scene, Inna heads to the airport, and Ivanov follows her by car. Through the car window, the two share a meaningful look, symbolizing a hopeful future together.

== Cast ==
- Lev Durov as Aleksandr Nikolaevich Vysotin
- Aleksandr Galibin as Yuri Ivanov
- Anatoly Grachyov as Igor Tolkunov
- Gunnar Kilgas as Clark, president of a foreign concern
- Lev Kruglyy as engineer Chernetsov
- Irina Miroshnichenko as Inna
- Ernst Romanov as Ilya Zuev
- Vsevolod Sanaev as Oleg Maksimovich Astakhov, Deputy Minister
- Vyacheslav Tikhonov as Konstantin Pavlovich Ivanov
- Nikolay Volkov Sr. as Konstantin Ivanov's father
- Yevgeniya Khanayeva as Konstantin Ivanov's mother-in-law
- Vytautas Paukštė as Bogan
