= Nadezhda Lukashevich =

Russian singer and actress (born 1949)

- Born: 26 November 1949; Pyatigorsk, Russian Federation

Nadezhda Pavlovna Lukashevich (Brushtein) (Russian: Наде́жда Па́вловна Лукаше́вич (Бруштейн)) is a Russian singer and actress. She is a member (soloist, director) of the trio Meridian, popular in the Soviet Union.

Together with other members of the trio, Nadezhda Lukashevich was recipient of the Lenin Komsomol Prize (1985) and the honorary title Meritorious Artist of the Russian Federation (1995).

== Filmography ==
- 1983: Torpedo Bombers (Торпедоносцы), as Nastya
