= Mikhail Shuydin =

- Born: September 27, 1922 village Kazachya, Shchyokinsky District, Tula Oblast, RSFSR
- Died: August 24, 1983 (aged 60); Moscow, RSFSR, USSR
- Occupation(s): actor, clown
- Title: Order of the Red Star (1943); Order of the Red Banner (1944); People's Artist of the USSR (1980)

Mikhail Ivanovich Shuydin (Russian: Михаил Иванович Шуйдин; 27 September 1922 — 24 August 1983) was a Soviet clown and acrobat-eccentric. People's Artist of the RSFSR. From 1950 he worked in the arena with Yury Nikulin, Member of the Great Patriotic War.

== Biography ==
Shuydin was born on September 27, 1922, in the village of Kazachya in the Shchyokinsky District of Tula Oblast to a shepherd's family. He lost his parents early on in his life and then moved to Podolsk near Moscow.

Around the start of World War II, he began working at Podolsk's 187th plant as a locksmith. In May 1942 Shuydin was drafted into the Red Army becoming a student at the Cadet 1st Gorky Tank School. After graduating from college with honors he was sent to the 35th Guards Tank Brigade as a lieutenant.

From 1945-1948 he studied at GUTSI (State School of Circus Arts). In 1950 he graduated from the studio of conversational genres at the Moscow Circus on Tsvetnoy Boulevard. He then began working with Yuri Nikulin as an apprentice-assistant clowns to Karandash.

Soon after leaving Karandash, Nikulin and Shuydin created the clown duo "Nikulin and Shuydin" which lasted until Shuydin suffered a severe illness in 1983. Shuydin's clown image was that of a daring guy who knows everything, in contrast to the image of Nikulin, who was lazy and melancholic. Thus, their joint work was based on conflicting characters.

Shuydin died on August 24, 1983, after a severe and prolonged illness and was buried in Moscow at Kuntsevo Cemetery.

== Awards and titles ==
- Order of the Red Star (1943)
- Order of the Red Banner (1944)
- Jubilee Medal In Commemoration of the 100th Anniversary of the Birth of Vladimir Ilyich Lenin
- Medal For the Defence of Moscow
- Medal For the Defence of Stalingrad
- Medal For the Victory over Germany in the Great Patriotic War 1941–1945
- Jubilee Medal Twenty Years of Victory in the Great Patriotic War 1941–1945
- Jubilee Medal Thirty Years of Victory in the Great Patriotic War 1941–1945
- Medal Veteran of Labour
- Jubilee Medal 50 Years of the Armed Forces of the USSR
- Jubilee Medal 60 Years of the Armed Forces of the USSR
- Medal In Commemoration of the 800th Anniversary of Moscow
- Honored Artist of the RSFSR (1969)
- People's Artist of the RSFSR (1980)

== Memory ==
In November 2011, in front of the circus in Kursk, a monument to Yuri Nikulin and Mikhail Shuydin was erected.
