= Young Wife =

- Russian: Молодая жена
- Directed by: Leonid Menaker
- Written by: Irina Velembovskaya
- Starring: Anna Kamenkova; Vladlen Biryukov; Galina Makarova; Sergei Prokhanov; Elena Melnikova
- Cinematography: Vladimir Kovzel
- Music by: Yakov Vaisburd
- Release date: 1978
- Country: Soviet Union
- Language: Russian

Young Wife (Russian: Молодая жена) is a 1978 Soviet romantic drama film directed by Leonid Menaker.

== Plot ==
Manya and Volodya fell in love with each other in their school years. And when Volodya joined the army, he returned with a new girlfriend. Manya was so offended that she agreed to marry the widower Alexei. But it was difficult for her in a new family and she decides to go to the city to enter the technical school.

== Cast ==
- Anna Kamenkova as Manya Streltsova
- Vladlen Biryukov as Aleksey Ivanovich Terekhov
- Galina Makarova as grandma Agasha
- Sergei Prokhanov as Volodya
- Elena Melnikova as Valya, Manya's friend, Volodya's sister
- Sofya Dzhishkariani as Lyusya, Aleksey's daughter (as Sonya Dzhishkariani)
- Igor Erelt as Volodya's father
- Tatyana Gorlova as grandma Nyura, Aleksey's aunt
- Natalya Nazarova as Tamara, saleswoman
- Igor Ozerov as Igor Pavlovich
