= Vytautas Paukštė =

Lithuanian actor (1932–2022)

- Born: 2 July 1932; Kaunas, Lithuania
- Died: 21 July 2022 (aged 90); Klaipėda, Lithuania
- Occupation: Actor
- Years active: 1968–2022

Vytautas Paukštė (2 July 1932 – 21 July 2022) was a Lithuanian actor. He appeared in more than forty films between 1968 and his death.

== Selected filmography ==
Year	Title	Role	Notes
1968	Feelings	teacher	
1972	Northern Crusades	Bishop	
1972	That Sweet Word: Liberty!	prison doctor	
1973	Seventeen Moments of Spring	episode	uncredited
1976	...And Other Officials	Bogan	
1980	Rafferty	Hedn Bosworth	
