= Novosibirsk Globus Theatre =

Youth theatre in Novosibirsk, Russia

Coordinates: 55°1′30.25″N 82°55′44.28″E

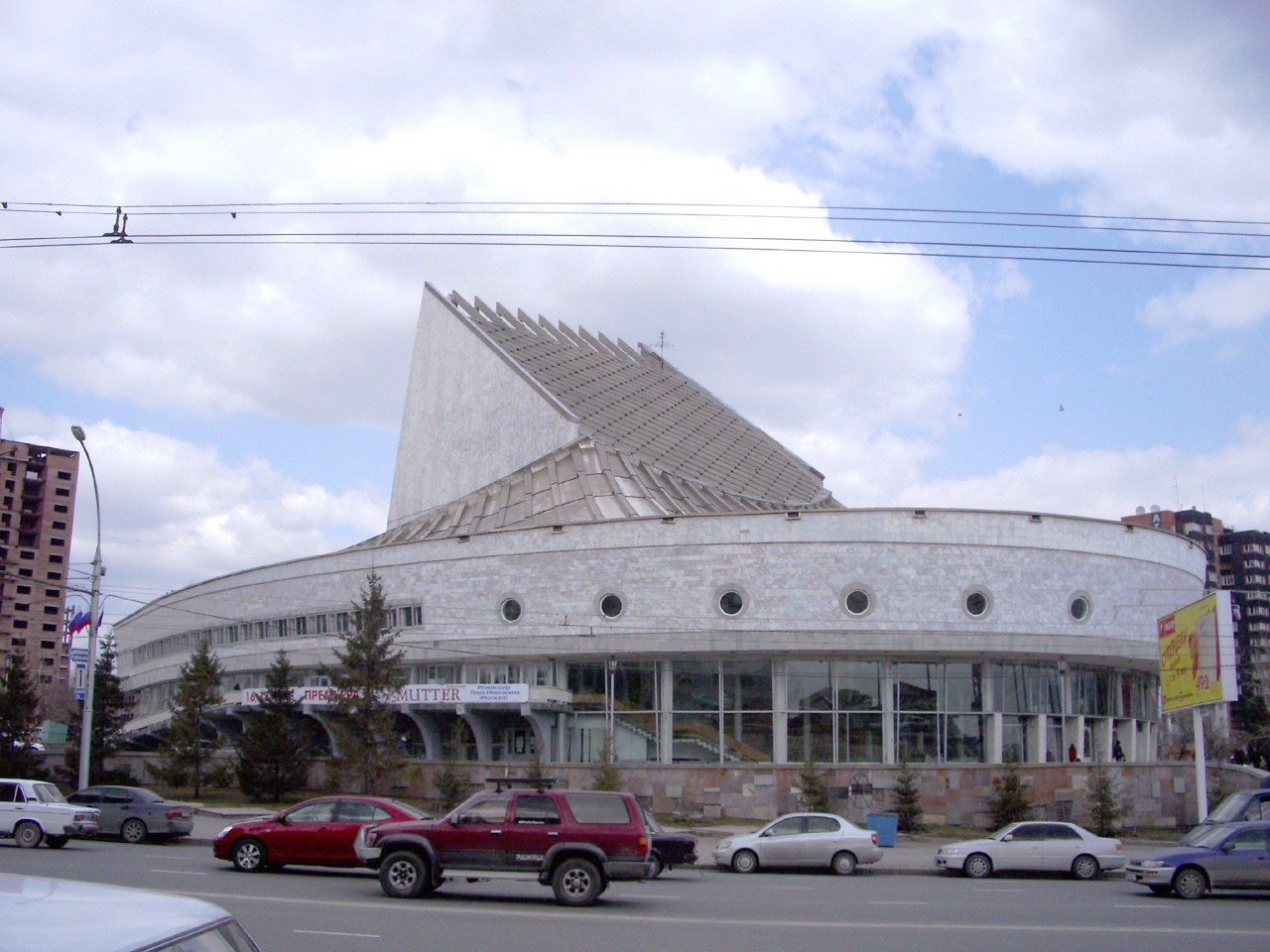
Novosibirsk Globus Theatre

Novosibirsk Globus Theatre (Russian: Новосибирский академический молодёжный театр «Глобус») is a theatre in Novosibirsk city, Siberia, Russia.

It was founded in 1930 in Novosibirsk city and was the first stationary theatre. Formerly it was known as Young Spectator's theatre, and was focused on youth and children.

The current building of the theatre was built in 1984.
