= Liteyny Theatre =

Theatre in St. Petersburg, Russia

Coordinates: 59.9372°N 30.3471°E

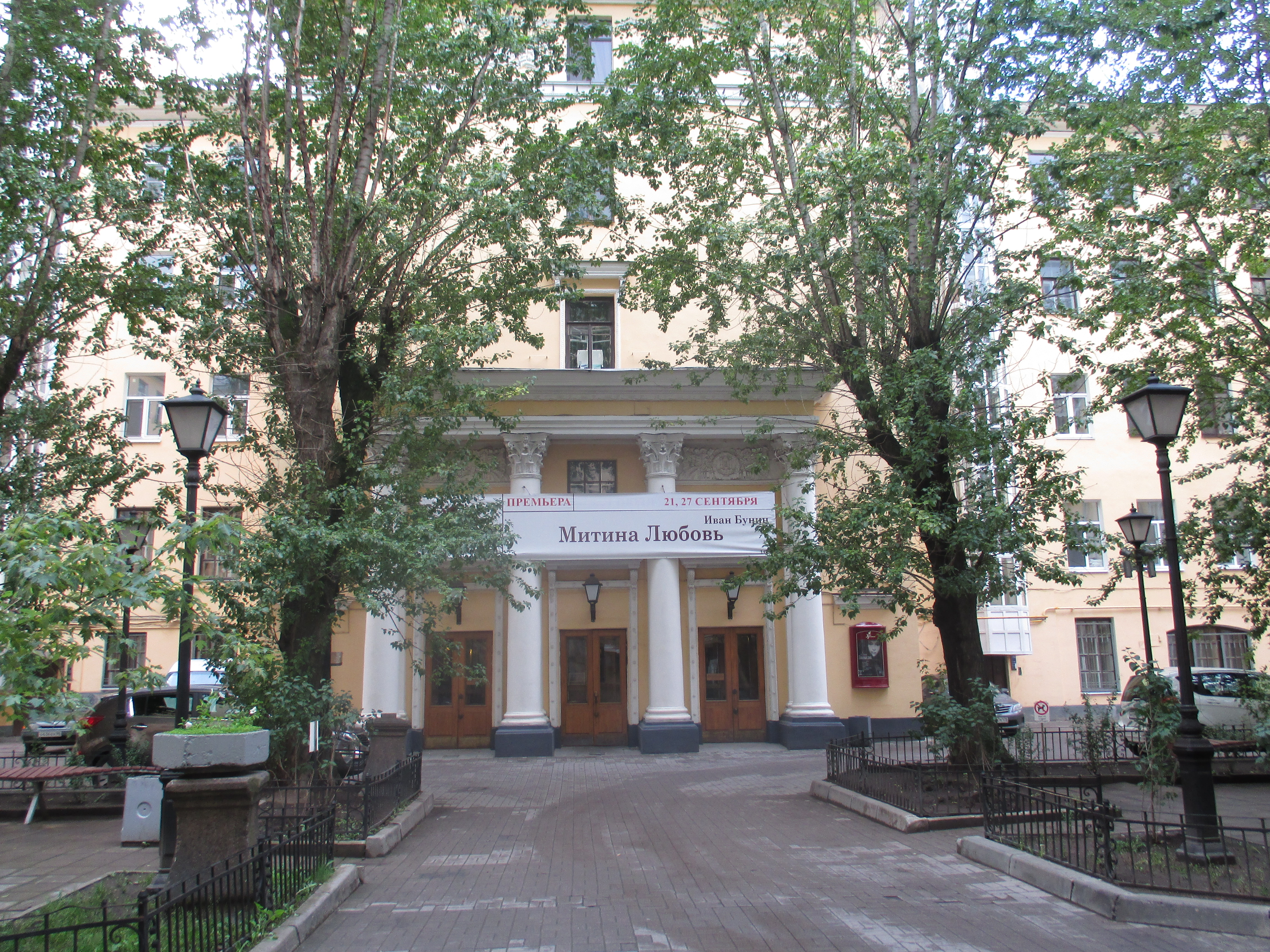
Rear main entrance of Na Liteinom Theatre

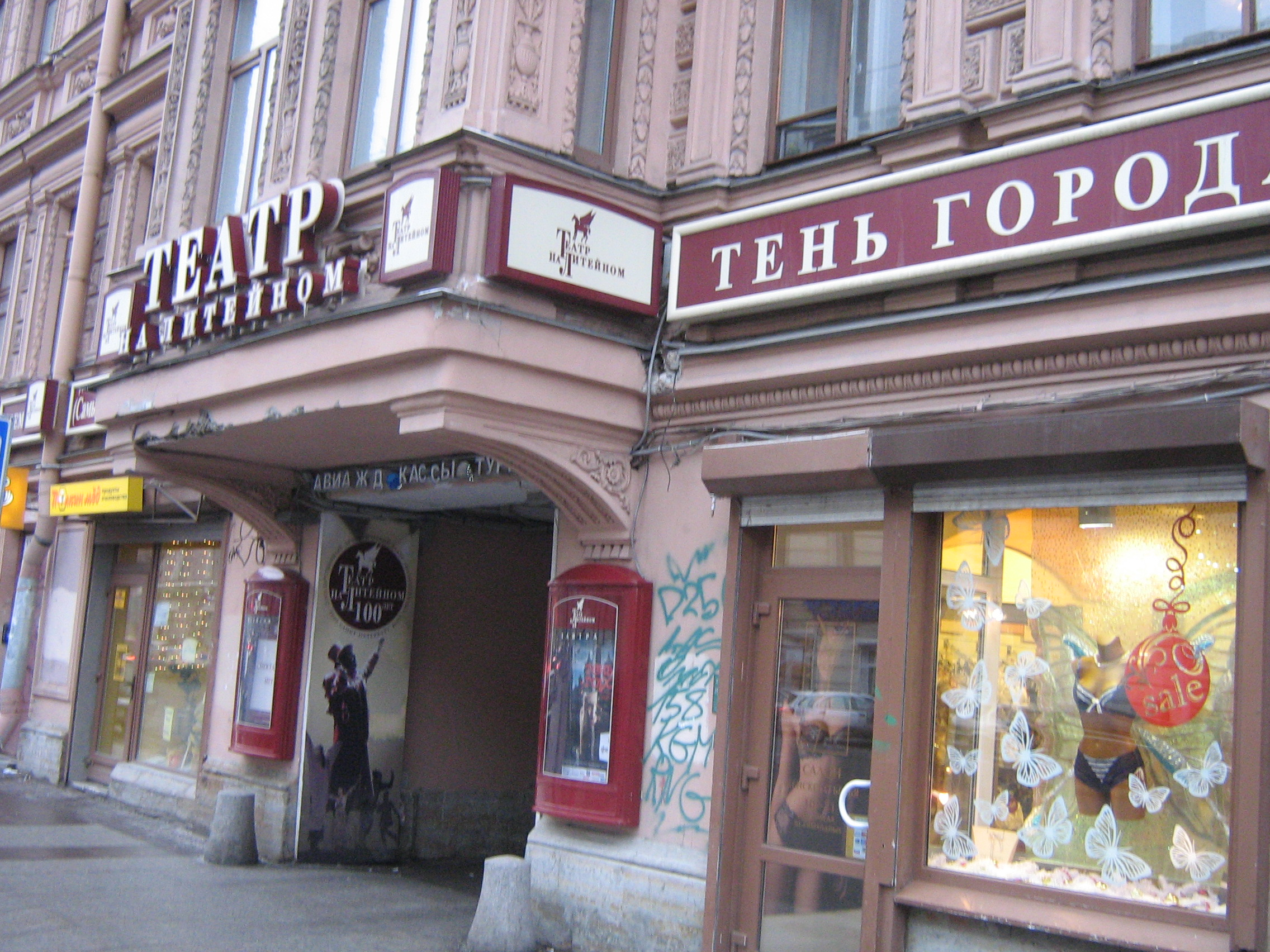
Ticket office of Na Liteinom Theatre

The State Dramatic Theatre on Liteyny Avenue (Государственный драматический Театр на Литейном) is a theatre at 51 Liteyny Avenue, Saint Petersburg, Russia. It was founded in 1909. Konstantin Tverskoy worked at the Liteinyi Theatre as director, Savely Schleifer (1881–1943) as designer. The Narodnaia Komedia (January 1920) took up Meyerhold's experiments from the Liteyni and Hermitage Theatre. The theatre produced many unusual offerings. In 1909 the Japanese play Terakoya was presented. Boris Romanov (1891-1957) choreographed the cabaret The Goatlegged, and Arkady Averchenko contributed sketches and vaudevilles.

In 1993 the Liteinyi's theatre troupe toured America with a production of George Bernard Shaw's Great Catherine in Russian.
