= Igor Fokin =

Russian puppeteer who performed in Harvard Square

Igor Aleksandrovich Fokin (Russian: Игорь Александрович Фокин; June 14, 1960 – September 21, 1996) was a Russian puppeteer and street performer. He learned his craft in his hometown of St. Petersburg. In 1993, he moved from the former Soviet Union to Cambridge, Massachusetts, in the United States. He was able to bring his wife and son over in 1994 and was granted a visa which allowed him to continue to live and perform in the United States.

Fokin performed puppet shows on summer evenings on street corners in Cambridge, using wooden marionettes set to traditional Russian music. He carved and painted the marionettes himself and also sewed their clothing. In 1996, he performed shows as part of the festivities at the Summer Olympics in Atlanta, Georgia.

Igor Fokin died of heart failure on September 21, 1996, at the age of 36, just a few hours after returning home from a show in Harvard Square.

Soon after word of his death spread, several fundraisers were held for his family by area street performers and members of the local community. On September 22, 2001, five years and one day after his death, a sculpture by Russian sculptor Konstantin Simun, modeled after one of his marionettes, was erected in his memory on the street corner in Brattle Square where he performed.
