= A Dog Was Walking on the Piano =

- Russian: Шла собака по роялю
- Directed by: Vladimir Grammatikov
- Written by: Viktoriya Tokareva
- Produced by: Zinovy Genzer; Mikhail Kapustin
- Starring: Alyona Kishchik; Aleksandr Fomin; Valeri Kislenko; Dariya Malchevskaya; Leonid Kuravlyov
- Cinematography: Pyotr Katayev
- Edited by: Tamara Belyayeva
- Music by: Aleksey Rybnikov
- Production company: Gorky Film Studio
- Release date: 1978
- Running time: 68 min.
- Country: Soviet Union
- Language: Russian

A Dog Was Walking on the Piano (Russian: Шла собака по роялю, romanized: Shla sobaka po royalyu) is a 1978 Soviet comedy film directed by Vladimir Grammatikov.

== Plot ==
The film tells about a girl named Tanya, who lives in a village in which she does not see anything romantic. Suddenly she decided to change something and begins to make plans first about the pilot Komarov, then with Misha, who lives opposite, and her sister, meanwhile, composes various ditties.

== Cast ==
- Alyona Kishchik as Tanya (voiced by Anna Kamenkova)
- Aleksandr Fomin as Mischa
- Valeri Kislenko as pilot Komarov
- Dariya Malchevskaya as Veronika
- Leonid Kuravlyov as Nikolai Kanareikin, Tanya's father
- Vladimir Basov as Gromov
- Yuriy Katin-Yartsev as Chizh, professor-folklorist
- Lyudmila Khityaeva as Frosya
- Elizaveta Nikishchikhina as Kanareikina, Tanya's mother
- Viktor Proskurin as mechanic at the airport
- Kira Smirnova as Malanya
