= Semyon Aranovich =

Russian filmmaker (1934–1996)

Семён Аранович
- Born: 23 July 1934; Derazhnia, Ukrainian SSR, Soviet Union
- Died: 8 September 1996 (aged 62); Hamburg, Germany
- Occupations: Film director, screenwriter, producer
- Years active: 1965–1996

Semyon Davidovich Aranovich (Russian: Семён Давидович Аранович; 23 July 1934, Derazhnia – 8 September 1996, Hamburg) was a Soviet and Russian film director, screenwriter and producer.

== Life and career ==
Aranovich attended the Supreme Naval Aviation School in Nikolaev, graduating in 1955, and served for two years in the Soviet naval aviation troops. In 1965, he graduated from VGIK, where he studied under Roman Karmen. While working at the Leningrad Documentary Studio in 1965–1970, Aranovich directed the biographical Time That Is Always with Us (1965) and The Friend of Gorky’s — Andreeva (1966), among other works. Two of his documentaries—one about Maksim Gorky’s last years, made in 1967, and one co-directed with Alexander Sokurov on Dmitri Shostakovich (1980) — were shelved and only released during the Perestroika.

His works included the documentaries The Anna Akhmatova Files (1989) (about the poet) and I Was Stalin's Bodyguard (1990)as well as features like Torpedo Bombers (1983), which was his greatest critical and box-office success. His 1994 film The Year of the Dog won the Silver Bear for Outstanding Artistic Contribution at the 44th Berlin International Film Festival.

He also directed the well-known television miniseries Rafferty in 1980 and Confrontation in 1985.

Andrei Kravchuk has made a documentary about him, Semyon Aranovich: Poslednii Kadr (Semyon Aranovich: The Final Shot).

== Selected filmography ==
=== Documentary ===
- The Anna Achmatova Files (Личное дело Анны Ахматовой, 1989)
- I Was Stalin's Bodyguard (Я служил в охране Сталина, или Опыт документальной мифологии, 1990)

=== Film and television ===
- ...And Other Officials (...И другие официальные лица, 1976)
- Summer Trip to the Sea (Летняя поездка к морю, 1978)
- Rafferty (Рафферти, 1980, TV)
- Torpedo Bombers (Торпедоносцы, 1983)
- Confrontation (Противостояние, 1985, TV)
- The Year of the Dog (Год собаки, 1994)
