= List of Soviet films of 1980 =

1980 Soviet films

| Title | Russian title | Director | Cast | Genre | Notes |
|---|---|---|---|---|---|
1980
| Air Crew | Экипаж | Alexander Mitta | Georgiy Zhzhonov, Leonid Filatov, Aleksandra Yakovleva, Yekaterina Vasilyeva | Disaster film | |
| The Adventures of the Elektronic | Приключения Электроника | Konstantin Bromberg | Yury Torsuyev, Vladimir Torsuyev | Adventure | |
| A Piece of Sky | Пощёчина | Henrik Malyan | Frunzik Mkrtchyan, Sofiko Chiaureli, Ashot Adamyan, Galina Belyayeva | Comedy | |
| Borrowing Matchsticks | За спичками | Leonid Gaidai, Risto Orko | Yevgeny Leonov, Vyacheslav Nevinny, Georgy Vitsin, Rita Polster | Comedy | Finnish-Soviet co-production |
| The Casket of Maria Medici | Ларец Марии Медичи | Rudolf Fruntov | Valeri Ryzhakov | Action | |
| Corps of General Shubnikov | Корпус генерала Шубникова | Damir Vyatich-Berezhnykh | Anatoliy Vasilev | War | |
| Do Not Part with Your Beloved | С любимыми не расставайтесь | Pavel Arsenov | Aleksandr Abdulov, Irina Alfyorova | Romantic drama | |
| Do Not Shoot at White Swans | Не стреляйте в белых лебедей | Rodion Nakhapetov | Stanislav Lyubshin, Nina Ruslanova, Vladimir Zamansky, Viktor Anisimov | Drama | |
| The Degraded | Разжалованный | Alexander Sokurov | Ilya Rivin | Drama | |
| The Evening Labyrinth | Вечерний лабиринт | Boris Bushmelev | Vladimir Basov | Comedy | |
| Fairfax's Millions | Миллионы Ферфакса | Nikolai Ilinsky | Juozas Budraitis, Grazhyna Baikshtite, Ilmar Tammour | Crime | |
| A Few Days from the Life of I.I. Oblomov | Несколько дней из жизни И. И. Обломова | Nikita Mikhalkov | Oleg Tabakov, Elena Solovey, Yuri Bogatyryov | Comedy-Drama | |
| Flying with an Astronaut | Полет с космонавтом | Gennadiy Vasilev | | | |
| Forest | Лес | Vladimir Motyl | Lyudmila Tselikovskaya | Comedy | |
| Fox Hunting | Охота на лис | Vadim Abdrashitov | Vladimir Gostyukhin, Irina Muravyova | Crime | |
| The Garage | Гараж | Eldar Ryazanov | Liya Akhedzhakova, Iya Savvina, Svetlana Nemolyayeva, Valentin Gaft | Comedy | |
| Granddaughter of Ice | Ледяная внучка | Boris Rytsarev | Svetlana Orlova | Fantasy | |
| An Ideal Husband | Идеальный муж | Viktor Georgiyev | Yury Yakovlev | Comedy | |
| Interrogation | Допрос | Rustam Ibragimbekov, Rasim Ojagov | Alexander Kalyagin | Crime drama | |
| Larisa | Лариса | Elem Klimov | | Documentary | Film tribute to Larisa Shepitko |
| Late Dates | Поздние свидания | Vladimir Grigoryev | Larisa Malevannaya | Melorama | |
| The Lifeguard | Спасатель | Sergei Solovyov | Tatyana Drubich | Drama | |
| Life on Holidays | Из жизни отдыхающих | Nikolai Gubenko | Regimantas Adomaitis | Drama | |
| Moscow Does Not Believe in Tears | Москва слезам не верит | Vladimir Menshov | Vera Alentova, Irina Muravyova, Aleksey Batalov, Natalya Vavilova | Drama | Won an Academy Award, entered into the Berlin IFF |
| My Father Is an Idealist | Мой папа — идеалист | Vladimir Bortko | Vladislav Strzhelchik | Romance | |
| Night Accident | Ночное происшествие | Venyamin Dorman | Pyotr Velyaminov | Crime | |
| Ogaryova Street, Number 6 | Огарёва, 6 | Boris Grigoryev | Vasiliy Lanovoy | Crime | |
| Once Upon a Time Twenty Years Later | Однажды двадцать лет спустя | Yuri Yegorov | Natalya Gundareva | Comedy | |
| Particularly Important Task | Особо важное задание | Yevgeny Matveev | Yevgeny Matveev | Drama | |
| Petrovka, 38 | Петровка, 38 | Boris Grigoryev | Georgiy Yumatov | Crime | |
| Pirates of the 20th Century | Пираты XX века | Boris Durov | Nikolai Yeryomenko Jr., Pyotr Velyaminov, Talgat Nigmatulin | Action | |
| Rafferty | Рафферти | Semyon Aranovich | Oleg Borisov, Armen Dzhigarkhanyan, Alexander Kaidanovsky | Drama | |
| Sailors Have No Questions | У матросов нет вопросов) | Vladimir Rogovoy | Natalya Kaznacheyeva | Comedy | |
| Solo | Соло | Konstantin Lopushansky | Nikolai Grinko | Drama | |
| Squadron of Flying Hussars | Эскадрон гусар летучих | Nikita Khubov and Stanislav Rostotsky | Andrei Rostotsky | War | |
| Star Inspector | Звёздный инспектор | Mark Kovalyov, Vladimir Polin | Vladimir Ivashov, Yury Gusev | Science fiction | |
| The Twelve Months | Двенадцать месяцев | Yugo Serikawa, Kimio Yabuki, Tetsuo Imazawa | Kimio Yabuki, Ikuko Oyabu, Tomoe Takashi | Animation | Japanese-Soviet co-production |
| We Looked in the Death's Face | Мы смерти смотрели в лицо | Naum Birman | Oleg Dahl | Drama | |
| The White Crow | Белый ворон | Valeriy Lonskoy | Vladimir Gostyukhin, Irina Dymchenko, Aleksandr Mikhaylov, Irina Akulova, Lev Borisov | Drama | |
| White Snow of Russia | Белый снег России | Yuri Vyshinsky | Aleksandr Mikhailov | Drama | |
| Who will pay for Luck? | Кто заплатит за удачу? | Konstantin Khudyakov | Aleksandr Filippenko | Action | |
