= Nigmatullin =

Nigmatullin or Nigmatulin is a Turkic surname originating from the masculine given name Nimatullah; its feminine counterpart is Nigmatullina or Nigmatulina. Notable people with the surname include:

- Artur Nigmatullin (born 1991), Russian football goalkeeper
- Khalim Nigmatullin (born 1972), Russian ice hockey defenceman and coach
- Linda Nigmatulina (born 1983), Kazakhstani actress
- Nurlan Nigmatulin (born 1962), Kazakhstani politician
- Ruslan Nigmatullin (born 1974), Russian football goalkeeper
- Talgat Nigmatulin (1949–1985), Kazakhstani actor and martial artist
- Uliana Nigmatullina (born 1994), Russian biathlete
- Venera Nigmatulina (born 1962), Kazakhstani actress
