= Dal Orlov =

Russian film critic (1935–2021)

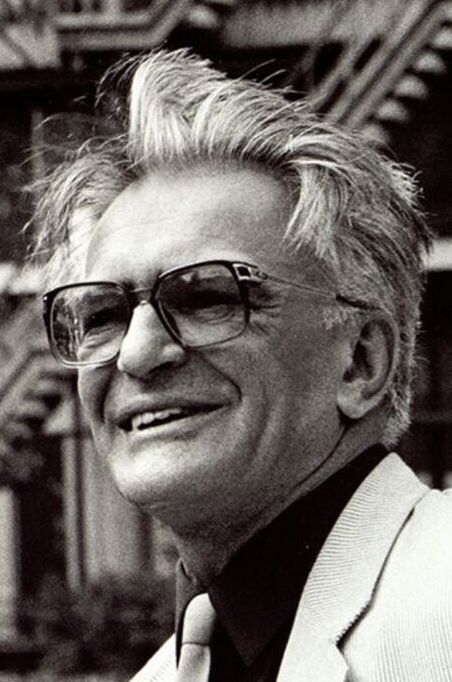
- 1985
- Born: 10 February 1935; Razdolnoye, Far Eastern Krai, Russian SFSR
- Died: 24 February 2021 (aged 86); Moscow, Russia
- Occupation: Film Critic

Dal Konstantinovich Orlov (Russian: Даль Константинович Орлов; 10 February 1935 – 24 February 2021) was a Russian film critic, journalist, and screenwriter. He was an Honored Art Worker of the Russian Soviet Federative Socialist Republic.

== Biography ==
Orlov was born in 1935 in the village of Razdolnoye in Far Eastern Krai. He was the son of the political officer of the Red Army Konstantin Vasilyevich Orlov and Asya Grigorievna Itsikson. In 1941, the family moved to Irkutsk, and then to Asino the following year. His mother moved to Kustanay to spend time with her brother, who was Editor-in-Chief of the newspaper Stalin's Way.

Orlov finished secondary school in Moscow in 1952 and graduated from Moscow State University in 1957 with a degree in philology. From 1958 to 1969, he worked for the newspaper Trud before serving as Deputy Editor-in-Chief of the film magazine Iskusstvo Kino. He also served as Editor-in-Chief of Soviet Screen from 1978 to 1986. From 1980 to 1986, he hosted the television show Kinopanorama. He was the Moscow correspondent of the newspaper Novoe Ruskoe Slovo.

Orlov was a member of the Union of Soviet Writers, the Union of Cinematographers of the Russian Federation, the Russian Union of Journalists, and the Russian Theatrical Society.

Dal Orlov died in Moscow on 24 February 2021 at the age of 86. He is buried in Crimea in the settlement of Simeiz, near Mount Koshka, next to his wife and father-in-law.

== Screenwriting ==
- Leader (1984)
- Hard to Be a God (1989)

== Personal life ==
Dal's wife was Elena Izergina-Orlova, a fashion model and theater critic.
