= Venera Nigmatulina =

Kazakhstani actress (born 1962)

Honored Worker of Kazakhstan Venera Abdrakhmanovna Nigmatulina Actress
- Born: Venera Makhmudovna Ibragimova; 10 August 1962 (age 62); Almaty, Kazakh SSR, Soviet Union
- Citizenship: USSR, Kazakhstan
- Education: The Tashkent State Institute of Culture
- Occupation(s): Actress, director, screenwriter, producer
- Years active: 1973–present
- Height: 170 cm (5 ft 7 in)
- Spouse(s): Talgat Nigmatulin, Ruslan Samarkhanovich
- Children: Linda, Eldar, Altamir

Venera Abdrakhmanovna Nigmatulina (Kazakh: Венера Нығматулина, Venera Nyğmatulina; born 10 August 1962) is a Kazakhstani film actress and director of the film festival Shaken's Stars. She is the widow of Talgat Nigmatulin and the mother of Linda Nigmatulina. Venera Abdrakhmanovna Nigmatulina is a well-known actress, producer, and public figure who serves as an inspiration to aspiring actors and actresses. Her impressive resume includes roles in film and television, as well as work as an actress, producer, host, and screenwriter. Venera Nigmatulina continues to surprise and inspire young generations as a professional in the workplace and a caring mother.

== Early life ==
Venera Ibragimova, known as Venera Nigmatulina was born on 10 August 1962, in Alma-Ata. In 1990, she graduated from the Directing department of the Tashkent Institute of Culture with a degree in theater and film director in Tashkent. She also received a doctorate in film arts in 2007. After graduating from the institute, she began to act as Venera Ibragimova. In 1979, she made her film debut in the role of Raushan in the film "Bride for a Brother." In 1981, she worked with director Malisa Ukubeeva, playing the main role of Gulya in the film "Provincial Romance."

Since 1987, Venera Nigmatulina has been a member of the Union of Cinematographers of the USSR and Kazakhstan. In 1991, she played the main role in the drama "Women's Prison." Exactly one year later in 1992, Venera directed the film "Presentation in Isolation". The film was a great success, which was then rolled around the world – in Germany, England, Poland, France and Bulgaria.

Since 1995, the actress decided to create her own production center, which popularized Kazakh cinema. Venera is the owner of a black belt in karate. Since 2000, Venera began developing a career. From 2000 to 2002, she was the vice-president of the Union of Cinematographers of Kazakhstan.

In 2003, she became a member of the expert production commission for the selection and release of film products in the Republic of Kazakhstan. Then she was the chairperson of the jury of the festival of sports films, organized within the framework of the International Sports Games by the Agency for Sports and Tourism of the Republic of Kazakhstan.

From 2002 to 2014, she was the General Director of the Shaken Stars Film Festival. In addition to acting, Venera acted as a producer, scriptwriter and presenter in various television programs; "Program 24", "I write to you", "Creative portraits of filmmakers of Kazakhstan" and many others. In 2009, she produced the feature film "Who are You, Mr. Ka?" In 2013, he was a member of the jury of the contest " Diva Almaty 2013" A year later, she starred in a video for a cosmetics company. In 2016, she starred in the Kazakh television series "Zaure," which played the main role. Venera Nigmatulina is currently the General Director of the Shaken Stars Film Festival.

== Personal life ==
The Nigmatulin family is widely known in Kazakhstan as one of the most influential people in the film industry.

Venera is the widow of Soviet actor Talgat Nigmatulin, who died in 1985. Talgat and Venera Nigumatulina first met on the set of the film "Provincial Romance," where Talgat played the main role. A short time later, the couple married when Venera was 19 years old and Talgat was 33 years old. Talgat Nigmatulin admired the work of Bruce Lee, whose wife was named Linda. Therefore, when a daughter was born in the Nigmatulin family on 14 May 1983, she was named Linda. Later she also became an actress.

When Talgat Nigmatulin tragically died, Venera was unable to recover for a long time. However, after a long time in the 90s, she remarried to a master of sports in judo Ruslan Samarkhanovich. In 1998, the first child named Eldar was born, and in 2000, Altamir.

== Awards ==
In 2001, Venera Nigmatulina was awarded the medal "Kazakhstan Republikasynyn tauelsizdigine 10 zhyl."

She was awarded the Order of "Kurmet" in 2008.

In 2013, she received the honorary title "Honored Worker of Kazakhstan."

== Filmography ==
=== Roles ===
(2016) Zaure (TV Series, Kazakhstan) – Venera main role (2009) City of Dreams (Kazakhstan) – Aliya Sabitova-main role

(1996–2000) Perekrestok (TV series, Kazakhstan) – Madina Umarova / Zarema Smailova-main role

(1992–1997) Taras Shevchenko. Testament | Taras Shevchenko. Zapovit (TV series, Ukraine) – kazashka Katya

(1991) Flight of the Arrow-main role

(1991) Women's Prison-Madina Galieva-main role

(1990) East Corridor, or the Po Racket...

(1989) Knockdown

(1988) Death in the name of birth

(1988) We're all a bit of a horse

(1987) Son – in-law from the province-Alma, Yesen's wife

(1986) Victims have no claims-episode

(1983) Wolf Pit-Mariyam, Samat's sister

(1982) Alien Five – Nasiba Karimovna, teacher

(1981) Provincial novel-Gulya-main role

(1980) Impossible Children-Aigul-in the credits of V. Ibragimov

(1979) Bride for a brother-Raushan

=== Producer ===
(2009) Who are you, Mr. Ka?

=== Director ===
(1992) Presentation in Isolation (film)

== See also ==
Talgat Nigmatulin

Linda Nigmatulina

Shaken's Stars
