= Linda Nigmatulina =

Kazakhstani actress and singer (born 1983)

- Born: 14 May 1983 (age 42); Almaty, Kazakhstan
- Occupation: Actress
- Children: 1
- Parent(s): Talgat Nigmatulin; Venera Nigmatulina

Linda Talgatovna Nigmatulina (born 14 May 1983) is a Kazakhstani actress and singer.

== Early life ==
Nigmatulina was born on 14 May 1983 in Almaty. Her father, actor Talgat Nigmatulin, had Tatar and Uzbek roots, and mother, actress Venera Nigmatulina was of Uyghur descent. Talgat was a fan of Bruce Lee, whose wife was named Linda. Venera at that time was fond of Linda McCartney, the first wife Paul McCartney, so the daughter was by mutual consent called Linda.

== Career ==
Nigmatulina earned her first film fee (60 kopecks) at the age of three. Together with her mother, she starred in the film “Son-in-law from the province”. Linda herself jokes that her first role was played by an embryo, since her mother, being six months pregnant, starred in the film “Wolf Pit”. At school, she was engaged in art swimming, and attended music school. After graduating from school, Nigmatulina enrolled at Kazakh National Academy of Arts.

For the film “Bear Hunt”, about five hundred actresses tried for the role of Marina, but the director of the film Valery Nikolaev chose Nigmatulina. In 2007, she shot for Moulin Rouge magazine.

Initially, Nigmatulina came to fame as a singer. She performed in a group of five-piece girl group "Nisso", which was modeled after the London-based pop group Spice Girls. In 2009, together with Kairat Tuntekov, took part in the project Eki Zhuldyz. In 2010, together with Ruslan Honcharov, took part in the project Channel One Ice and Fire. In January 2012, in Prague, she took part in photo and video filming of the Garnier Color Nechrals paint advertising campaign. She became the face of Garnier Color Nechrals in Kazakhstan. In 2012, she shot an ad for ASU drinking water.

On 12 September 2013, in Almaty, together with Igor Vernik led the solemn presentation of the Fashion TV Awards. The event was dedicated to the tenth anniversary of the first Kazakhstani channel on fashion - Fashion TV Kazakhstan. In 2013, shot for DPD Kazakhstan advertising. On 26 September 2014, she visited Taldykorgan. In the concert hall of the City Palace of Culture, the audience was shown a film by Kazakhstani director Eli Gilman dubbed “Milk, Sour Cream, Cottage Cheese”, in which Linda Nigmatulina, Gulnara Silbaeva and Daulet Abdygaparov performed the main roles.

In March 2015, she took part in the first large-scale Internet action in support of children with serious illnesses - “Heart to Heart”. In July 2015, Nigmatulina presented her first European composition “it's ok”, which was recorded in London. She works in the Modern Theater of the enterprise under the direction of producer Albert Moginov. She plays in the performance “Brutal Lesson”.

== Personal life ==
Nigmatulina was married to the soloist of the group "Bubliki" Mukhtar Otali. In 2000, at the age of 17, she gave birth to a son, Alrami.

Nigmatulina is a convinced vegetarian. She is actively involved in animal protection activities. Her son is also a vegetarian. In addition to singing and cinema, dancing, she has a black belt in Kyokushin, and is also a good rider.

A documentary about Linda Nigmatulina in Kazakhstan was filmed titled "The Soul that Sings".

Nigmatulina had lived in Moscow from 2005 to 2021. Since 2021, she resides in Astana.
