= Night Accident =

Night Accident may refer to:

- Night Accident (1980 film), a Soviet crime film directed by Venyamin Dorman
- Night Accident (2017 film), a Kyrgyzstani drama film directed by Temirbek Birnazarov
