= The Lost Expedition =

- Russian: Пропавшая экспедиция
- Directed by: Venyamin Dorman
- Written by: Isai Kuznetsov; Avenir Zak
- Starring: Viktor Sergachyov; Aleksandr Abdulov; Nikolay Gorlov; Nikolai Grinko; Alexander Kaidanovsky
- Cinematography: Anatoly Buravchikov; Vadim Kornilyev
- Music by: Mikael Tariverdiev
- Production company: Gorky Film Studio
- Release date: 1975
- Running time: 133 min.
- Country: Soviet Union
- Language: Russian

The Lost Expedition (Russian: Пропавшая экспедиция, romanized: Propavshaya ekspeditsiya) is a 1975 Soviet mystery drama film directed by Venyamin Dorman.

== Plot ==
The film takes place in 1918. The expedition, consisting of two people engaged in the search for gold deposits, goes to Siberia. Soon local residents join them. Some really want to help them, others pursue selfish goals.

== Cast ==
- Viktor Sergachyov as Yefim Subbota
- Yevgeniya Simonova as Tasya Smelkova
- Nikolai Gorlov as Usaty
- Nikolai Grinko as the professor, Tasya's father
- Anatoly Kalabulin as Proshka
- Alexander Kaidanovsky as Zimin
- Yuri Kayurov as Volzhin
- Lev Prygunov as Alexey Kazankov
- Vakhtang Kikabidze as Arsen Georgievich Kabakhidze
- Georgy Martirosyan as Tikhon
- Nikolay Olyalin as gold digger Silantiy
- Radner Muratov as Akhmetka
- Vadim Zakharchenko as Khariton
