= Volno-Nadezhdinskoye =

Rural locality in Primorsky Krai, Russia

Coordinates: 43°22′32″N 131°59′17″E

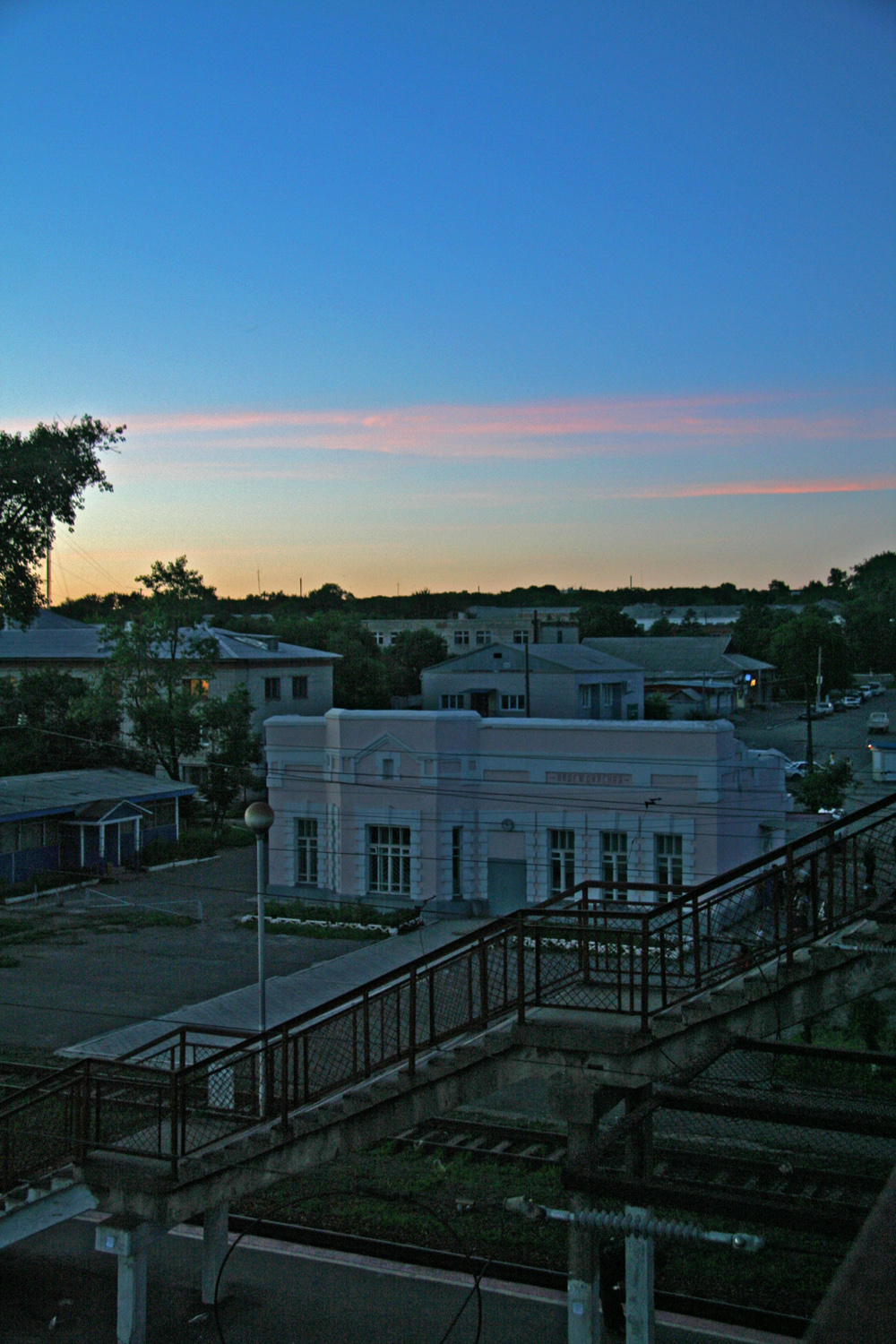
Volno-Nadezhdinskoye railway station

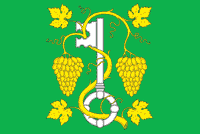
Flag of Volno-Nadezhdinskoye

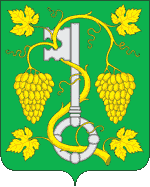
Coat of arms of Volno-Nadezhdinskoye

Volno-Nadezhdinskoye (Russian: Вольно-Надеждинское) is a rural locality (a selo) and the administrative center of Nadezhdinsky District, Primorsky Krai, Russia. Population: 6,694 (2010 census); 6,765 (2002 census); 5,975 (1989 Soviet census).
