= Nadezhdinsky District =

Nadezhdinsky District Надеждинский район (Russian)
- District
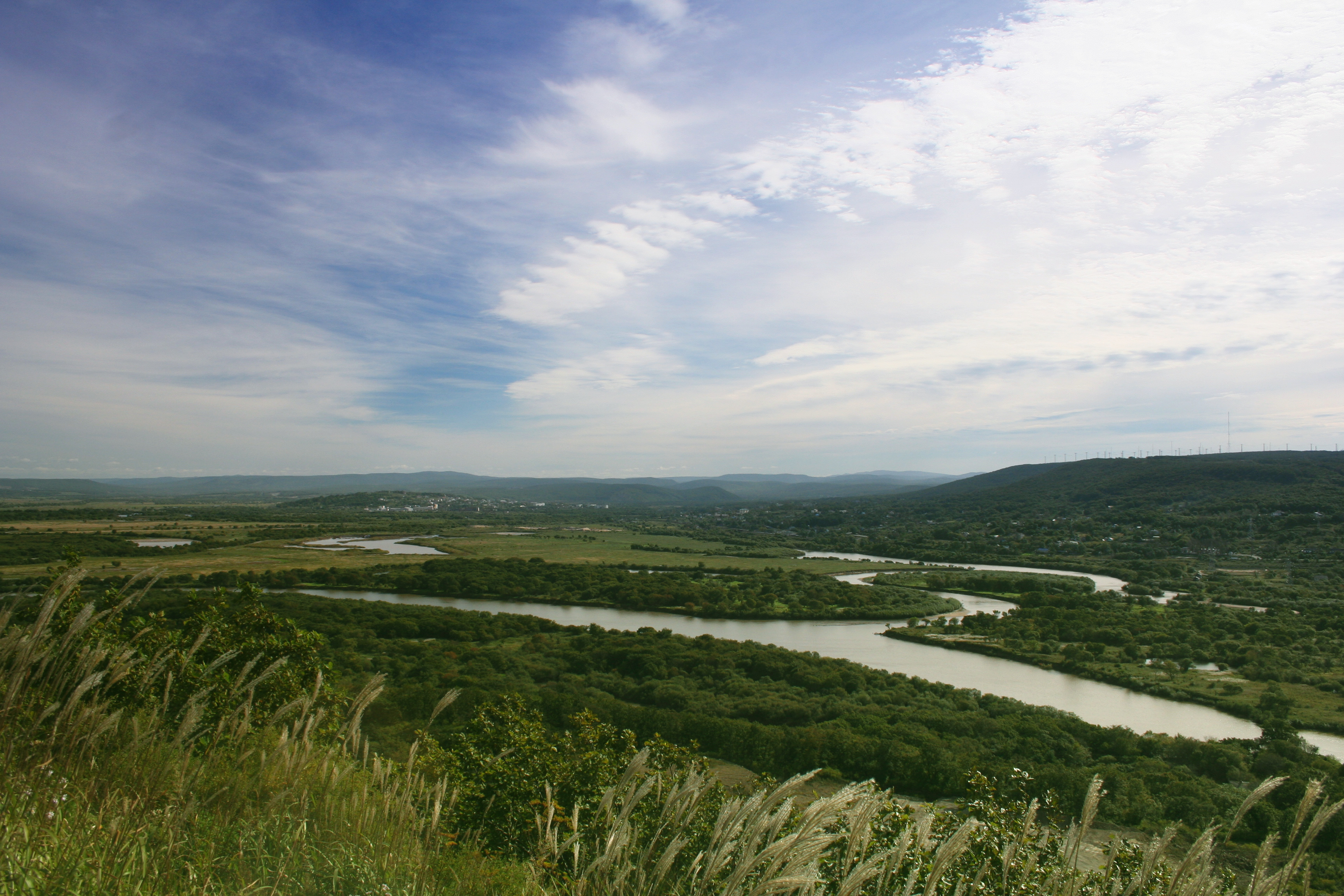
- Razdolnaya River, Nadezhdinsky District

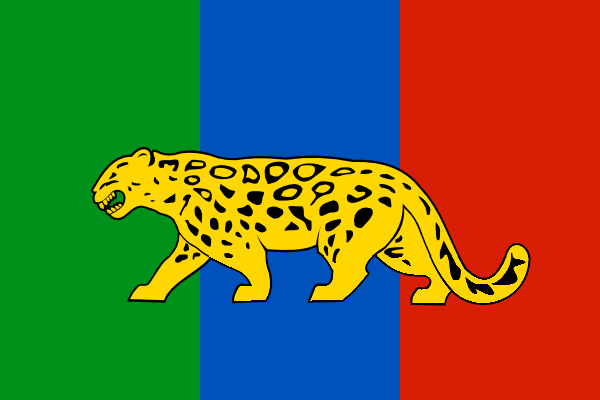
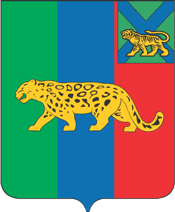
- Flag Coat of arms
- Location of Nadezhdinsky District in Primorsky Krai
- Coordinates: 43°24′N 132°00′E
- Country: Russia
- Federal subject: Primorsky Krai
- Established: 1937
- Administrative center: Volno-Nadezhdinskoye

Area
  - Total: 1,595.7 km^{2} (616.1 sq mi)

Population (2010 Census)
  - Total: 39,161
  - Density: 24.542/km^{2} (63.562/sq mi)
  - Urban: 0%
  - Rural: 100%

Administrative structure
  - Inhabited localities: 34 rural localities

Municipal structure
  - Municipally incorporated as: Nadezhdinsky Municipal District
  - Municipal divisions: 0 urban settlements, 3 rural settlements
- Time zone: UTC+10 (MSK+7)
- OKTMO ID: 05623000
- Website: http://nadezhdinsky.ru/

Nadezhdinsky District (Russian: Наде́ждинский райо́н) is an administrative and municipal district (raion), one of the twenty-two in Primorsky Krai, Russia. It is located on the southern coast of the krai. The area of the district is 1,595.7 square kilometers (616.1 sq mi). Its administrative center is the rural locality (a selo) of Volno-Nadezhdinskoye. Population: 39,161 (2010 census); 40,197 (2002 census); 43,012 (1989 Soviet census). The population of Volno-Nadezhdinskoye accounts for 17.1% of the district's total population.

== Geography ==
The Razdolnaya River crosses the territory of the district. Despite the high density of the population, close location to the large city, and the developed road network, Nadezhdinsky District boasts the unique nature attractions such as the yew (Taxus cuspidata) grove with an area of 400,000 square meters (4,300,000 sq ft), and Korean pine forests.

== History ==
The district was established in 1937.

== Economy ==
The favorable climatic conditions and closeness to Vladivostok (the administrative center of the krai) predetermined the district's specialization. There are seven agricultural enterprises which provide Vladivostok with meat, milk, eggs, vegetables, and potatoes. Mink, foxes, polecats, and deer are bred in the district.

For more than a hundred years, the brown coal deposits have been exploited in the territory of the district (Tavrichanskoye Deposit), and construction sand in the Razdolnaya River Valley has been the raw material for silicate brick production. The Razdolnensky Construction Materials Plant, which is one of the district's largest enterprises, is involved in the production of bricks. There are deposits of porous basalt, which is the raw material used by Terekhovsky Concrete Production Plant. Not far from Kiparisovo railway station are beds of sandstone which is the quartz-containing raw materials used by the glass industry. The largest glassworks in Primorsky Krai is located here.

=== Transportation ===
A federal road connects the settlement of Razdolnoye with Khasan, located on the North Korea–Russia border.
