= The Russia We Lost =

1992 film by Stanislav Govorukhin

The Russia We Lost (Russian: Россия, которую мы потеряли, romanized: Rossiya, kotoruyu my poteryali, lit. 'Russia, which we lost') is a 1992 Russian documentary film directed and narrated by Stanislav Govorukhin, dedicated to pre-revolutionary Russia.

Govorukhin worked on the film for a long period, spending much of his time in archives, libraries, and film depositories. In 1991, Stanislav Govorukhin published a book which he called The Russia...we Lost (Россия… Которую мы потеряли), which formed the basis of the script of this film.

== Synopsis ==
The film contains a large amount of factual information: photos, documents, and newsreels. However, Govorukhin's work is not limited to a statement of facts, but offers his worldview. Standing on the positions of anti-communism, the director largely idealizes tsarist Russia and criticizes Maxim Gorky. Much attention is paid to the personalities of Stolypin, Lenin, and Nicholas II.

Russia. Mysterious and unfamiliar country. It just so happens we don't know anything about it. That's probably why we live so hard and so stupidly... The more you learn about this unfamiliar country, the stronger you fall in love with it. This happens involuntarily... What we show is like the impression of a man who began to learn the history of his country in adulthood. And everything we learned in the process of filming, turned the soul. How did it happen, why did the Lord take away people's minds, how could they plunder and destroy such a rich country? And why, why didn't we know anything about her, about our Homeland?

— a quote from the film

== Perception ==
The film had a strong public response and played a significant role in breaking the mass consciousness of the Soviet people in the early 1990s. The phrase "the Russia we have lost" has become a household term for pre-revolutionary Russia, but is also used as a mockery of the idealization of pre-revolutionary Russia - Especially in internet memes with the title of the film serving as a caption for unglamorous photographs of serfdom and poverty taken during the Tsarist era, as well as more humorous ones with the title serving as a caption for images depicting dinosaurs in the prehistoric age.
