= The Long Farewell =

1971 film directed by Kira Muratova

- Directed by: Kira Muratova
- Written by: Natalya Ryazantseva
- Produced by: Grigory Kogan
- Starring: Zinaida Sharko; Oleg Vladimirsky; Yuri Kayurov
- Cinematography: Gennadi Karyuk
- Edited by: Valentina Oleinik
- Music by: Oleg Karavaychuk
- Production company: Odessa Film Studio
- Release date: 1987
- Running time: 95 minutes
- Country: USSR
- Language: Russian

The Long Farewell (Russian: «Долгие проводы», romanized: Dolgie provody) is a Soviet film drama directed by Kira Muratova.

It was filmed in 1971, but was shelved by the authorities, only being released during Perestroika in 1987

== Plot ==
Eighteen-year-old student Sasha Ustinov lives with his divorced, single mother, Yevgenia, who has worked as an office translator for 15 years. She questions him about his recent first visit to his father in Novosibirsk, to which he gives only brief answers. While they search for her parents' grave in a cemetery, Yevgenia tells him stories from her father's life. Afterward, they take the train to a family friend's dacha by the sea. Throughout the journey, Sasha is distant to his mother's stories about her life. Upon arrival, Sasha lets his mother greet the hosts alone, during which she is introduced to another guest, Nikolai, and is asked to keep him occupied. She gladly takes on this task, and the two of them walk through the spacious garden, engaged in lively conversation.

Sasha sees Masha, the hosts' daughter, and he tells her that she has changed a lot. His flashbacks reveal that he once had stronger feelings for the girl, which is why he has always refused to accompany his mother on these visits. It is also clear that Sasha is still captivated by Masha, but she doesn't reciprocate his feelings, something he is well aware of. He declines her offer to call her in town, explaining that he won't be there much longer. While everyone is sitting at the lunch table, Yevgenia reprimands her son in front of everyone for trivial matters.

Back in the city, Sasha meets Tatiana, a friend who is looking for a new job. Suddenly, she hides as a man from the local employment commission responsible for Tatiana approaches. Sasha tries to reprimand him, but the man calmly reads his palm, realizing that Tatiana isn't mentioned there, meaning he doesn't care about her at all. He mentions that he will continue to look after her, because he cares for her wellbeing. Tatiana leaves to go to Yevgenia, who she wants to find her a new job. Although Yevgenia has just come from a disappointing and humiliating meeting with her boss, she agrees. She then learns from Tatiana for the first time that her son wants to live with his father in Siberia.

Since Sasha hasn't told her anything about his plans, Yevgenia goes to the post office and asks her mail carrier, Tonetchka, to stop delivering Sasha's mail, as she will be picking it up herself from now on. She also asks for notification if a letter arrives from Novosibirsk for Sasha. Tonetchka refuses, however, as this would violate regulations. Back home, Yevgenia finds her son searching for his savings, which he has misplaced. While his mother tries to get him to divulge what he needs the money for, she changes her clothes to go to the theater. Sasha asks her who is waiting for her in the taxi downstairs, but receives no answer. Yevgenia signals from the window to the man in the car, Nikolai, to drive a little further on to avoid being seen. In the car ride, although she hears nothing but compliments from Nikolai, an argument ensues, and Yevgenia angrily goes back home.

Although forbidden by regulations, Tonetschka delivers a package from Novosibirsk to Yevgenia. It contains several slides and a letter from her ex-husband, in which he dismisses Sasha's suspicions that she might be intercepting his mail. At the same time, Sasha is making a long-distance call to his father from a phone booth, which his mother overhears. He confirms to his father that he has decided to move in with him, as he can no longer stand living with his mother. Back home, Yevgenia sets up a slide projector and looks at the pictures from the package. Sasha arrives and discovers the pictures and the letter addressed to him. She unleashes all her anger on him as he wants to leave, which she doesn't understand. Sasha calmly promises to write to her.

After a company event where Yevgenia has presented various awards, Sasha dances with Tatiana while his mother searches for him. When she finally finds him, she tells everyone what a lovely son she has and that it's perfectly right for a son to want to be with his father. They both then attend a following concert, but their reserved seats are already occupied. While the pantomime performance is already underway on stage, Yevgenia loudly insists on keeping her seats. Sasha repeatedly tries to calm her down and get her out of the hall. He finally succeeds, and they leave together. When Sasha sees that his mother is completely distraught, he feels sorry for her and promises to stay with her.

== Cast ==
- Zinaida Sharko as Yevgenia Vasilyevna Ustinova
- Oleg Vladimirsky as Sasha Ustinov
- Yuri Kayurov as Nikolai Sergeyevich
- Lidia Dranovskaya as Vykhodtseva
- Viktor Ilchenko as Pavel Konstantinovich
- Lidiya Brazilskaya as Tonya
- Svetlana Kabanova as Tatiana Kartseva

== Awards and nominations ==
1987

- Nika Award — Best Film, Best Director (Kira Muratova), Best Actress (Zinaida Sharko), Best Cinematographer (Gennadi Karyuk): nom
- All-Union Film Festival — Grand Prix Jury: win
- Locarno Festival — FIPRESCI Award: win
