= Bukhuti Zakariadze =

Georgian actor

- Born: 1 June 1913; Sanqaçal, Baku Governorate, Russian Empire
- Died: 1 February 1988 (aged 74); Tbilisi, Georgian SSR, Soviet Union
- Occupation: Actor
- Years active: 1933–1988

Bukhuti Zakariadze (Georgian: ბუხუტი ზაქარიაძე; 1 June 1913 – 1 February 1988) was a Georgian film and theatre actor. People's Artist of the Georgian SSR (1965).

== Biography ==
Zakariadze was the younger brother of award-winning Georgian actor Sergo Zakariadze. He made his debut performance on the stage of the Lado Meskhisvili Theater in Kutaisi in 1933. In 1935, he joined the cast of the Akaki Tsereteli Theater in Chiatura, but moved to the Batumi Ilia Chavchavadze Theater two years later. From 1941 to 1945, he worked in the Rustaveli Theatre. After the end of the Second World War, Zakariadze became a regular actor of the Mardzhashvili Georgian Academic Theater in Tbilisi, and from 1948 he performed in the Sukhumi State Theater, named after Samson Chanba. In 1953, he returned to the Rustaveli's stage, where he continued acting until his departure.

Zakariadze first appeared on screen in 1956, in Tengiz Abuladze's short film Magdana's Donkey, which won the Palme d'Or du court métrage in the 1956 Cannes Film Festival. He eventually played in more than thirty films. He was awarded the title Honored Artist of the Georgian SSR, and in 1965 the distinction People's Artist of the Georgian SSR. He died in February 1988. (Note: Many sources report that he died on 12 February 1988; however, his obituary was published in the newspaper "Komunisti" on 6 February 1988.)

== Select filmography ==
- 1955 – Magdana's Donkey
- 1965 – Pierre – a Police Officer
- 1967 – Vertical
- 1970 – Liberation
- 1977 – Wounded Game
- 1985 – Spring
