= Vertical (film) =

- Directed by: Stanislav Govorukhin; Boris Durov
- Written by: Sergei Tarasov; Nikolai Rasheyev
- Starring: Vladimir Vysotsky; Gennadi Voropayev; Larisa Luzhina; Bukhuti Zakariadze
- Cinematography: Albert Osipov
- Edited by: Valeria Belova
- Music by: Sofia Gubaidulina; Vladimir Vysotsky
- Production company: Odessa Film Studio
- Release date: 1967
- Running time: 73 min
- Country: Soviet Union
- Language: Russian

Vertical (Russian: Вертикаль, romanized: Vertikal) is a 1967 Soviet sports action adventure film directed by Stanislav Govorukhin and Boris Durov. With 32.8 million viewers it became one of the 1967 Soviet box office leaders (10th place among the Soviet-produced movies and 13th place it total). The film was a directorial debut for both Govorukhin and Durov. It was also the first movie where Vladimir Vysotsky worked as a composer and songwriter. His songs became extremely popular, they were immediately released on the extended play and gave a start to his musical career.

The film tells the story of a seasoned climber Vitali Lomov who leads a team to conquer a treacherous peak, but important information is kept secret and an approaching cyclone tests their survival and trust.

== Plot ==
A group of climbers, led by the experienced Vitaly Lomov, a veteran of the Great Patriotic War, sets out to conquer the fictional mountain of Or-Tau in Svaneti. Along the way, they stop in a village where Lomov’s old friend, Vissarion, lives. Vissarion is the father of Iliko, a climber who died in the mountains.

Upon arriving at the base of the mountain, the team establishes a base camp, leaving behind radio operator Volodya and doctor Larisa while four climbers begin the ascent.

The next day, Volodya receives a warning of an approaching cyclone and transmits a message ordering the group to abandon the climb and descend. However, Gennady, the climber who receives the message, faces a dilemma: follow the order and retreat without summiting, or take the risk of continuing, earning the respect of Larisa, for whom he has clear feelings. Gennady chooses to conceal the warning from his team.

The climbers successfully reach the summit, but on their descent, they are caught in a snowstorm and thunderstorm. One climber is struck by lightning, and Gennady suffers frostbite on his hands.

The group faces a perilous journey back to base camp. They split into two pairs: Gennady and Lomov descend, leaving Rita and the injured Alexander in a snow cave with limited supplies. During the descent, Gennady develops snow blindness. He and Lomov stumble upon a snow-buried tent, where they find a primus stove to warm up. Inside the tent, Lomov discovers a note left by Iliko, who had broken his leg during a climb and died from the cold.

When the stove goes out, Gennady confesses to Lomov that he had known about the approaching cyclone but had hidden the information from the team. Lomov remains stoic and continues the descent alone, eventually reaching base camp and organizing a rescue. Ultimately, all the climbers are saved.

== Cast ==
- Vladimir Vysotsky - Volodya
- Larisa Luzhina - Larissa
- Georgiy Kulbush - Vitaly Lomov, expedition leader
- Gennady Voropayev - Gennady
- Margarita Kosheleva - Rita
- Alexander Fadeev - Sasha Nikitin
- Bukhuti Zakariadze - Vissarion
- M. Anuchrinov
- L. Gliseyev
- L. Kakhilin
- Sh. Mareklin

== Production ==
=== The script ===
According to the memoirs of Sergei Tarasov, the script was based on the story of his brother-in-law Vladimir Kopalin, who climbed Lenin Peak in 1965: "I had a story not about people climbing mountains, but about an unknown soldier, so to speak, who did the most difficult work in the mountains to prove that he was not to blame in the tragedy that happened on the last ascent." Tarasov was not inspired by the draft, but after meeting Vysotsky, the screenwriter decided that with his ballads, "both meaning and clarity" would appear in the film. The working title of the script was "Possessed".

=== Filming ===
The film was shot in the Elbrus region of the Caucasus mountains in July–December, 1966 in black and white. In order for the actors to be able to play climbers convincingly, they have undergone special training. Actors mastered the ice axe, lived in tents, learned to walk as a rope team, climbed to a height of 3000 meters and passed all climbing certifications. After the filming was completed, the actors received badges "Climber of the USSR".

Vladimir Vysotsky was invited to play a radio operator after Yuri Vizbor declined the part. Vysotsky was intrigued by the opportunity to become a singer-songwriter for the film.

When you ask climbers why do they storm the peaks, no one can explain. Eliseev, Honored Master of Sports in Mountaineering, replied to my question, why he once climbed the mountains for the first time and why he still does it: "First, to check what kind of person I am. And now I'm just curious, what kind of people are around?" You know, in the mountains you can't rely on an ambulance and the police, only your friend, his hand, yourself and a fortune can help there. When we were making the film, we tried to answer the question: "Why do people actually go to the mountains? What attracts them there?" And while the film group was trying to answer this question, I wrote several climbing songs for myself and my friends. The climbers, having heard the songs, asked to insert them into the film.

— Vladimir Vysotsky
