= Yuri Kayurov =

Soviet and Russian actor (1927–2026)

- Юрий Каюров
- Born: 30 September 1927; Cherepovets, Leningrad Oblast, Russian SFSR, Soviet Union
- Died: November 2026 (aged 99)
- Occupation: Actor
- Years active: 1952–2026
- Spouse: Valentina Kayurova

Yuri Ivanovich Kayurov (Russian: Юрий Иванович Каюров; 30 September 1927 – November 2026) was a Soviet and Russian stage and film actor who was honoured as a People's Artist of the RSFSR in 1979. He was also the winner of two USSR State Prizes (1978, 1983), and was one of the most famous performers of the role of Vladimir Lenin in film and on stage. Kayurov died in November 2026, at the age of 99.

== Filmography ==
- The Sixth of July (1968) – Vladimir Lenin
- The Long Farewell (1971; released in 1987) – Nikolai Sergeyevich
- The Lost Expedition (1975) – Vladimir Petrovich Volzhin
- Golden River (1976) – Vladimir Petrovich Volzhin
- Widows (1976) – Krotov, military commissar
- White Snow of Russia (1980) – Nikolai Krylenko
- Night Accident (1980) – Nikolai Andreyevich Vladykin, head of the investigation department
- Lenin in Paris (1981) – Vladimir Lenin
- Investigation Led by Experts: Case 16 - From the Life of Fruits (1981) – Pyotr Nikiforovich
- The Romanovs: An Imperial Family (2000) – General Mikhail Alekseyev

== Awards and honors ==
- Honored Artist of the RSFSR (14 October 1963)
- Order of the Red Banner of Labour (22 June 1971)
- Order of Friendship of Peoples (4 November 1974)
- Two USSR State Prizes (1978, for participation in TV documentary series Our Biography; 1983, for his portrayal of Vladimir Lenin in Lenin in Paris)
- People's Artist of the RSFSR (6 August 1979)
- Order of the October Revolution (23 October 1987)
- Order of Honour (13 October 1998)
- Order "For Merit to the Fatherland", 4th class (15 September 2003) – for great contribution to the development of domestic art
- Order "For Merit to the Fatherland", 3rd class (14 July 2007) – for great contribution to the development of domestic theatrical art and many years of creative activity
- Order "For Merit to the Fatherland", 2nd class (2 March 2018) – for great contribution to the development of domestic culture and art, many years of fruitful activity
