= I Cannot Say "Farewell" =

- Directed by: Boris Durov
- Written by: Lidia Nemyonova
- Starring: Sergei Varchuk; Anastasia Ivanova; Tatiana Parkina
- Cinematography: Aleksander Rybin
- Music by: Evgeniy Gevorgyan
- Production company: Gorky Film Studio
- Release date: 1982
- Running time: 91 minutes
- Country: Soviet Union
- Language: Russian

I Cannot Say "Farewell" (Russian: Не могу сказать «прощай», romanized: Ne mogu skazat «proschai») is a 1982 romantic drama directed by Boris Durov. The film was very popular in the Soviet Union, seen by 32 million viewers in the first two months of its release and 34.6 million in total, reaching the 4th place at the 1982 Soviet box office.

The film tells the story of the plain and homely Lida Tenyakova, who meets the charming womanizer Sergei Vatagin at a dance party and quickly falls in love with him.

== Plot ==
The quiet and unassuming Lida Tenyakova meets Sergei Vatagin and quickly falls for him, but after a passionate night together, he moves on to Marta, the blonde beauty admired by all the local men. Sergei and Marta marry, and Lida, feeling hurt, repeatedly drives past the couple in a truck, splashing them with mud before speeding away. Her reckless driving draws the attention of Vasily, a traffic officer, with whom she later starts a relationship. Meanwhile, Sergei and Marta visit his mother in a village, where Sergei’s childhood friend Mikhail, a logging manager, persuades them to stay and work, promising high wages. However, one foggy day, Mikhail sends his crew to work in unsafe conditions, with Marta’s support, leading to a tragic accident that leaves Sergei paralyzed. Marta initially cares for him, but the strain damages their relationship, and she eventually returns to the city.

Lida learns of Sergei’s condition from Marta and, despite Vasily’s marriage proposal, decides to leave everything behind to care for Sergei. Moving in with him and taking a job at the logging company, she becomes his constant support. Sergei, in despair, considers taking his life, but Lida’s unwavering devotion gradually lifts his spirits. He begins working with wood, teaches local children, and even starts physical rehabilitation. When Vasily delivers a wheelchair, Sergei expresses gratitude and a desire for friendship. Marta eventually returns, but upon seeing Sergei and Lida’s happiness, she leaves quietly. Finally, Lida reveals she is pregnant, and the news brings Sergei so much joy that he rises to his feet.

== Cast ==
- Sergei Varchuk – Sergei Vatagin
- Anastasia Ivanova – Lida Tenyakova
- Tatiana Parkina – Marta
- Sofya Pavlova – Evdokia Semyonovna, Sergei's mother
- Alexander Korshunov – Vasily, a traffic police officer
- Sergei Minaev – singer on the dance floor
- Alexander Savchenko – Misha, Sergei's friend, director of forestry
- Klavdia Kozlenkova – wedding guest
- Vladimir Antonik – Kostya, Sergei's friend
