= Leader (1984 film) =

- Russian: Лидер
- Directed by: Boris Durov
- Written by: Dal Orlov
- Starring: Aleksey Volkov; Aleksandr Strizhenov; Yekaterina Strizhenova; Valentina Kareva; Anatoli Opritov
- Cinematography: Aleksandr Rybin
- Edited by: Rimma Tsegelnitskaya
- Music by: Yevgeniy Gevorgyan
- Release date: 1984
- Running time: 82 minute
- Country: Soviet Union
- Language: Russian

Leader (Russian: Лидер) is a 1984 Soviet drama film directed by Boris Durov.

== Plot ==
The film tells about a closed boy who came to study in a new class. He wants to decipher the mysterious letters of the disappeared Toltec tribe and is confronted with a misunderstanding of those around him.

== Cast ==
- Aleksey Volkov
- Aleksandr Strizhenov
- Yekaterina Strizhenova
- Valentina Kareva
- Anatoli Opritov
- Lyubov Strizhenova
- Anatoli Ganshin
- Vera Solovyova
- Yelena Sarycheva
- Yelena Mochalova
