= Stanislav Govorukhin =

Soviet and Russian film director, actor, screenwriter, producer and politician

- Станислав Говорухин
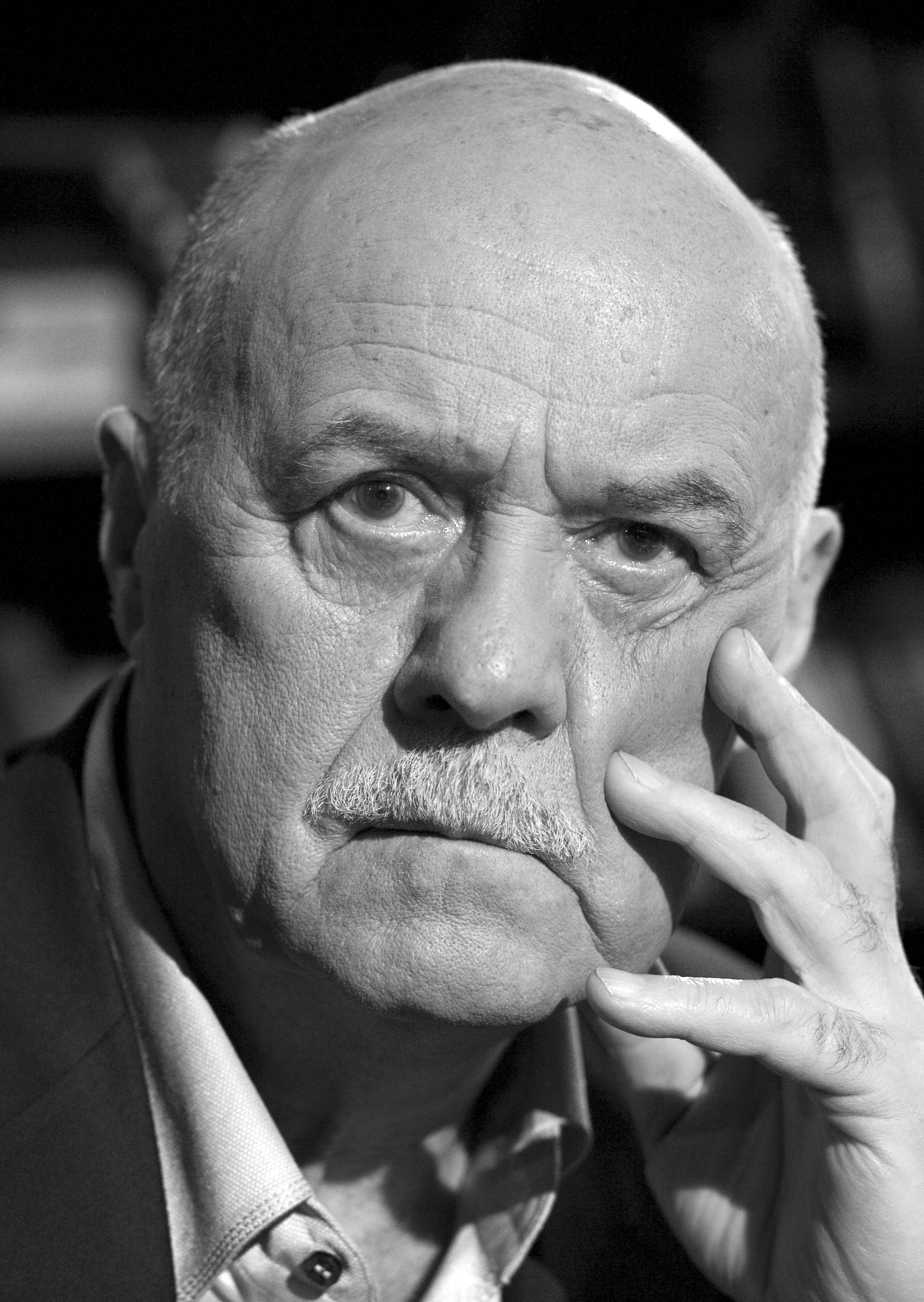
- Govorukhin in 2008
- Born: Stanislav Sergeyevich Govorukhin; 29 March 1936; Berezniki, Russian SFSR, Soviet Union
- Died: 14 June 2018 (aged 82); Barvikha, Russia
- Resting place: Novodevichy Cemetery
- Occupations: Film director, actor, screenwriter
- Notable work: The Meeting Place Cannot Be Changed (1979)
- Political party: United Russia (2005–2018)
- Other political affiliations: Democratic Party of Russia (1991—1993); Fatherland – All Russia (1999—2001)
- Awards: Order "For Merit to the Fatherland" (1st class)

Stanislav Sergeyevich Govorukhin (Russian: Станислав Сергеевич Говорухин; 29 March 1936 – 14 June 2018) was a Soviet and Russian film director, actor, screenwriter, producer and politician. He was named People's Artist of Russia in 2006. His movies often featured detective or adventure plots.

== Biography ==
Govorukhin was born in Berezniki, Sverdlovsk Oblast (now Perm Krai). His parents divorced before he was born. His father Sergei Georgievich Govorukhin came from Russian Don Cossacks and was arrested as part of the decossackization genocide campaign started by Yakov Sverdlov. He had been exiled to Siberia where he died around 1938 at the age of 30. His mother Praskovya Afanasievna Glazkova was a tailor. She came from the Volga region, from a simple Russian family of a village school teacher. She raised Sergei and his sister Inessa by herself and died at the age of 53.

Govorukhin started his career as a geologist in 1958. He then joined a television studio in Kazan and enrolled at the VGIK. During the Soviet period, Govorukhin became noted for his successful adaptations of adolescent classics, including Robinson Crusoe (1972), Adventures of Tom Sawyer (1981), In Search of the Castaways (1983) and Ten Little Niggers (an adaptation of Agatha Christie's original 1939 novel And Then There Were None) in 1987.

Most of his Soviet movies were made at the Odessa Film Studio. He was good friends with Vladimir Vysotsky and directed three movies starring him – Vertical (1967), White Explosion (1969) and The Meeting Place Cannot Be Changed (1979), one of the cult films of the late Soviet era. Several other of his films feature Visotsky's songs written as part of the soundtrack.

Apart from directing, he also wrote screenplays (including the top-grossing Soviet action film Pirates of the 20th Century directed by his fellow student Boris Durov in 1979) and started in movies as an actor. Being a trained mountaineer, he usually performed all the stunts himself. He also dedicated several movies to mountaineering, most notably Vertical and White Explosion which became some of the first examples of this subgenre in the Soviet cinema.

During the perestroika Govorukhin became less active at film making and more active in politics. He became one of the leaders of the Democratic Party of Russia. In 1990 he directed a much-publicized documentary highly critical of the Soviet society entitled We Can't Live Like This (also translates as You Can't Live Like That or This Is No Way to Live). Although his feature films were previously ignored by the critical establishment, this film won him the Nika Award for Best Director. It was at that time that Govorukhin released an extensive interview with Aleksandr Solzhenitsyn.

By the start of the 2000s he returned to cinema, co-starring with Alisa Freindlich in the detective TV series Female Logic and releasing another revenge movie, Voroshilov Sharpshooter (with Mikhail Ulyanov in the lead role). He directed a total of seven movies since then. In recent years he had been also actively working as a producer.

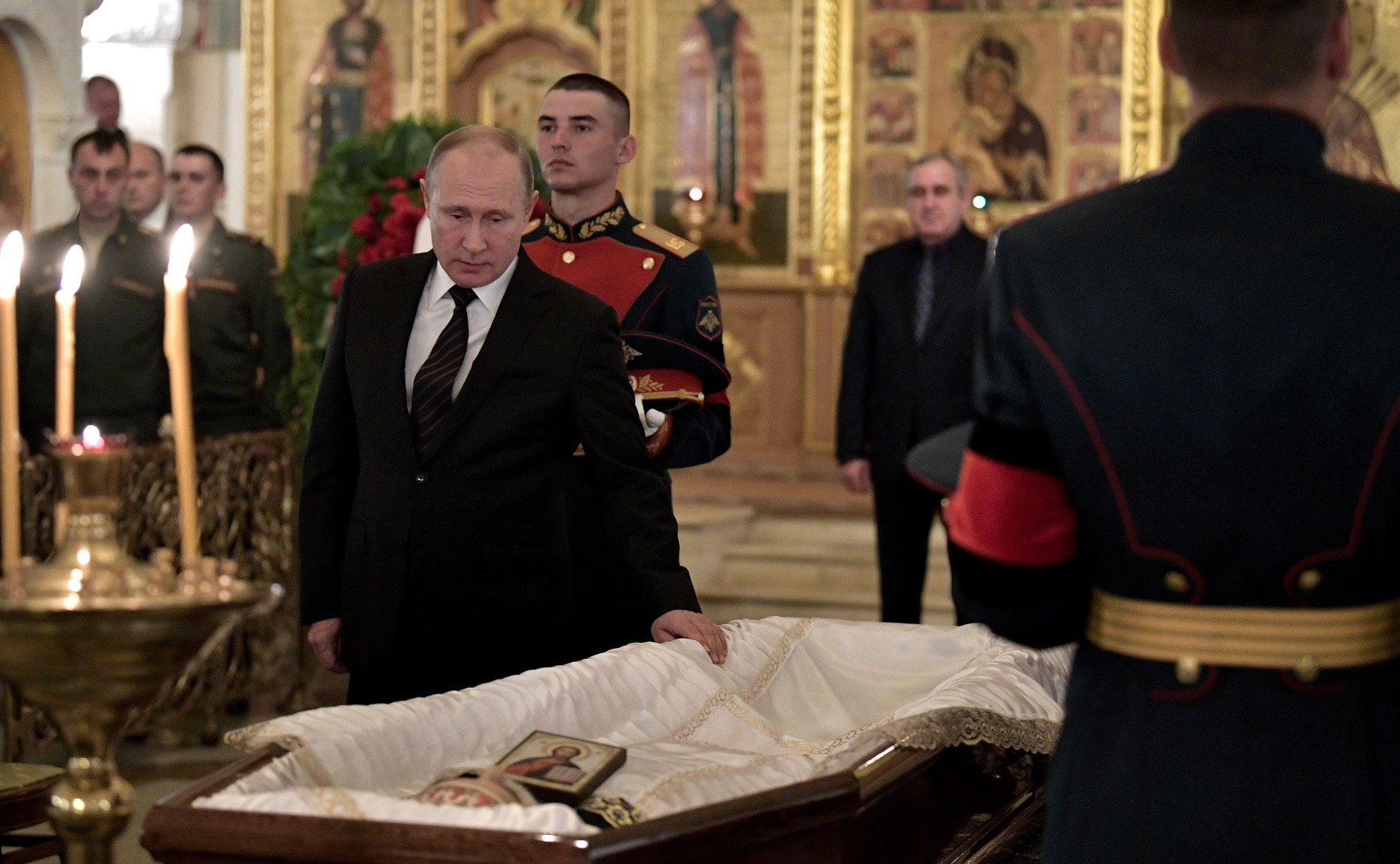
Russian President Vladimir Putin at the farewell ceremony for Stanislav Govorukhin, 16 June 2018.

Govorukhin died on 14 June 2018 at the age of 82 following a long illness. He was buried at the Novodevichy Cemetery in Moscow.

== Politics ==
Govorukhin had been a member of the State Duma since its inauguration in 1993, running the Duma culture committee for some time. Following the 1993 Russian constitutional crisis, he had abandoned his previous democratic anti-communist convictions and sided with the national-communist opposition. In 1996, he supported Gennady Zyuganov against Boris Yeltsin during the second round of the presidential election campaign. In 2000 he was a candidate in Russian presidential elections.

In 2011–2012 Govorukhin worked as the head of Vladimir Putin's campaign office. At this time he was a member of party United Russia.

In June 2013, he joined the central staff of the All-Russia People's Front, led by Russian president Vladimir Putin.

In March 2014, he signed a letter in support of the position of the president of Russia Vladimir Putin on Russia's annexation of Crimea.

== Personal life ==
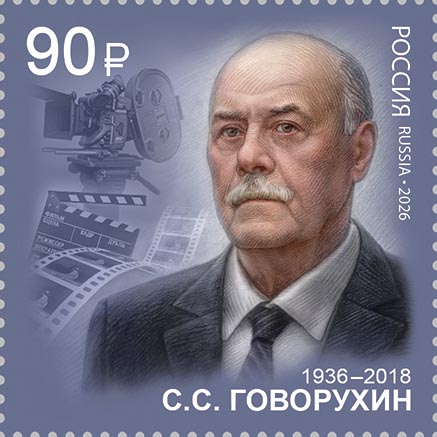
Govorukhin on a 2026 stamp of Russia

Govorukhin was married twice. He had one son from his first marriage — Sergey Govorukhin (1961–2011), a war correspondent, writer and director of documentary films who took part in different armed conflicts in Tajikistan, Yugoslavia, Afghanistan and both Chechen wars between 1994 and 2005. In 1995 he was wounded by Chechen terrorists which resulted in one of his legs being amputated. Nevertheless, he continued his work. In 1998 he released one of the most acclaimed documentaries about the First Chechen War — Damned and Forgotten that was awarded with the Nika Award in 1998 as the best documentary. He also took part in several non-governmental organizations dedicated to helping disabled war veterans. In 2011 he survived a stroke and died several days later at the age of 50. He left two sons and one daughter.

During the 1990s Stanislav Govorukhin became professionally interested in landscape painting. He held a number of exhibitions from 1998 onwards.

Govorukhin belonged to the Russian Orthodox Church. In 2016, during his 80th birthday, Patriarch Kirill of Moscow awarded him with the II class Order of Sergius of Radonezh.

== Filmography ==
Year	Title	Original title			
Year	Title	Original title	Director	Screenwriter	Notes
1964	Pharmacist	Аптекарша	✓		Short
1967	Vertical	Вертикаль	✓		Co-directed with Boris Durov
1968	Angel Day	День ангела	✓		
1969	White Explosion	Белый взрыв	✓	✓	
1972	Life and Amazing Adventures of Robinson Crusoe	Жизнь и удивительные приключения Робинзона Крузо	✓		
1974	Contraband	Контрабанда	✓	✓	
1977	A Breeze of «Hope»	Ветер «Надежды»	✓	✓	
1978	Marshal of Revolution	Маршал революции			Actor (General Alexander Kutepov)
1979	The Meeting Place Cannot Be Changed	Место встречи изменить нельзя	✓		
1979	Pirates of the 20th Century	Пираты XX века		✓	
1980	Invasion	Вторжение		✓	
1981	The Adventures of Tom Sawyer and Huckleberry Finn	Приключения Тома Сойера и Гекльберри Финна	✓	✓	
1982	The Return of Butterfly	Возвращение Баттерфляй			Actor (Mikhail Pavlyk)
1983	Among Grey Stones	Среди серых камней			Actor (judge)
1985	In Search of Captain Grant	В поисках капитана Гранта	✓	✓	
1986	Secrets of Madame Wong	Тайны мадам Вонг		✓	
1987	And Then There Were None	Десять Негритят	✓	✓	Soviet cinematic adaptation on the Agatha Christie novel of the same title.
1987	Assa	Асса			Actor (Krymov)
1988	Champagne Splashes	Брызги шампанского	✓	✓	
1989	Double Exposition	Двойная экспозиция			Actor (Herman Andreevich)
1990	We Can't Live Like This	Так жить нельзя	✓	✓	
1990	Sons of Bitches	Сукины дети			Actor (Sergei Popov, a writer)
1991	And the Wind Returns...	И возвращается ветер...			Actor (Sergei Gerasimov)
1992	Russia We Lost	Россия, которую мы потеряли	✓	✓	
1992	Encore, Once More Encore!	Анкор, ещё анкор!			Actor (Komdiv)
1994	Great Criminal Revolution	Великая криминальная революция	✓	✓	
1994	Moscow Nights	Подмосковные вечера		✓	
1995	The Black Veil	Чёрная вуаль		✓	
1995	Heads and Tails	Орёл и решка			Actor (Zosima Petrovich)
1997	War Is Over. Forget It...	Война окончена. Забудьте...			Cameo
1999	Voroshilov Sharpshooter	Ворошиловский стрелок	✓	✓	
2000	The Captain's Daughter	Русский бунт		✓	
2002–2006	Woman's Logic (mini-series)	Женская логика			Actor (Andrei Streltsov)
2003	Bless the Woman	Благословите женщину	✓		Actor (Komdiv)
2005	Not by Bread Alone	Не хлебом единым	✓		Actor (minister)
2005	The 9th Company	9 рота			Actor (training regiment commander)
2007	Actress	Артистка	✓		
2008	Passenger	Пассажирка	✓	✓	Producer, actor (Russian consul)
2008	On June 1941	В июне 41-го		✓	
2010	In the Style of Jazz	В стиле jazz	✓	✓	Producer
2010	Lovey-Dovey 3	Любовь-морковь 3			Actor (General)
2013	Weekend	Weekend	✓	✓	Producer
2015	The End of a Great Era	Конец прекрасной эпохи	✓	✓	Producer

== See also ==
- List of members of the State Duma of Russia who died in office
