= Razdolnoye, Primorsky Krai =

Razdolnoye Раздольное
- Settlement
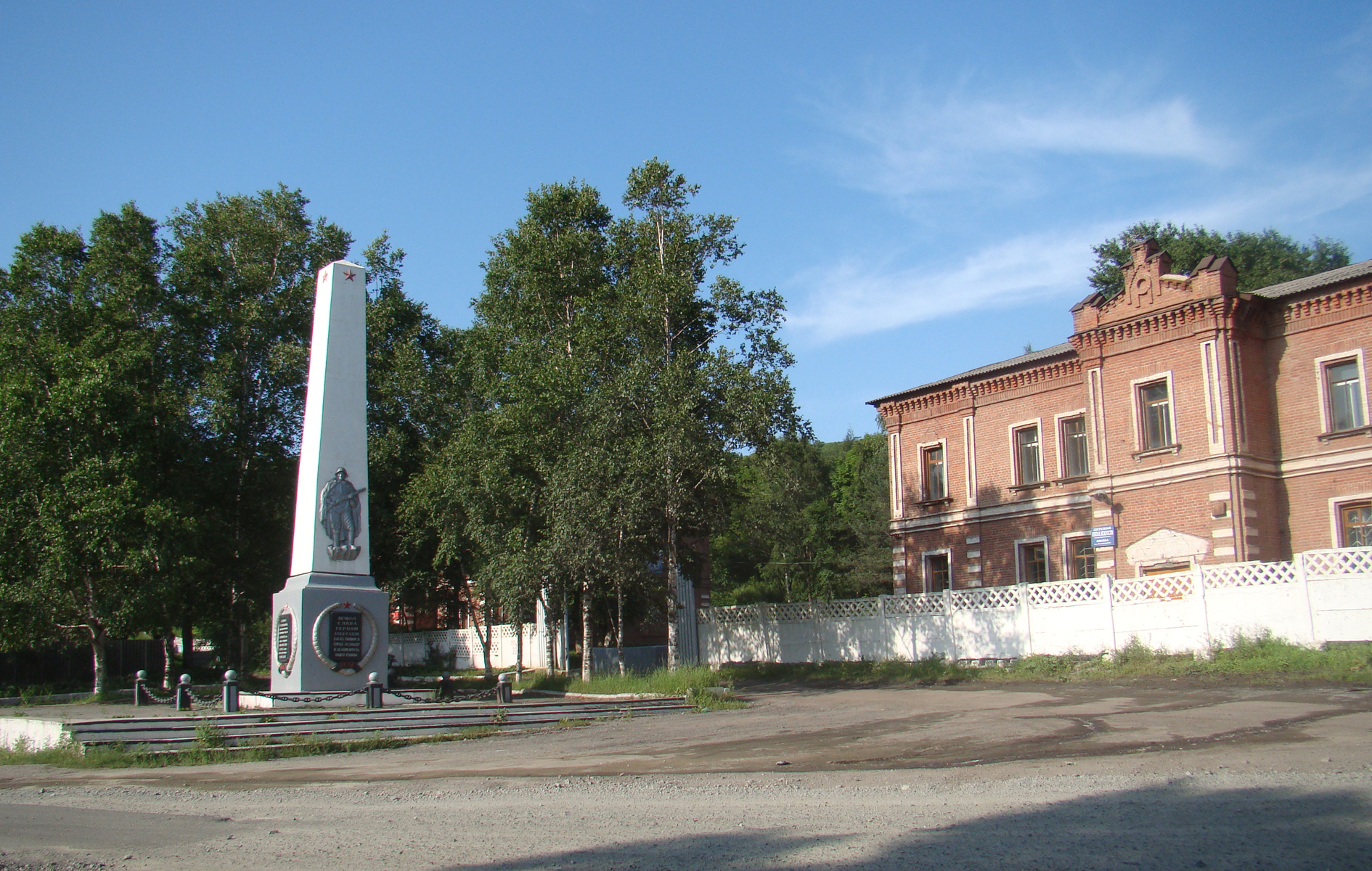
- Razdolnoye, 2009
- Interactive map of Razdolnoye
- Location of Razdolnoye Razdolnoye (Primorsky Krai)
- Coordinates: 43°32′50″N 131°54′00″E
- Country: Russia
- Federal subject: Primorsky Krai
- Administrative district: Nadezhdinsky District
- Founded: 1860
- Settlement status since: 1865

Population
  - Estimate (2021): 5,705 )

Municipal status
  - Municipal district: Nadezhdinsky District
  - Capital of: Razdolenskoye Rural Settlement
- Time zone: UTC+10 (MSK+7)
- Postal code: 692485
- OKTMO ID: 05623404101

Razdolnoye (Russian: Раздольное) is a settlement in Nadezhdinsky District, Primorsky Krai, a federal subject in the Russian Far East. The village is located on the Razdolnaya River, about 20 kilometers from its confluence with the Amur Bay and is stretched along its channel for 14 km, which makes it the longest in Primorye and one of the longest in Russia. The distance by road to the regional capital Vladivostok is about 58 km and to Ussuriysk about 34 km. The reconstruction of the Road A-189 (Razdolnoye-Khasan) connecting between Razdolnoye and Khasan connecting, the ports of Zarubino and Posyet, and the settlement of Khasan on the North Korea–Russia border was completed in November 2007.

== History ==
Razdolnoye is one of the oldest Russian settlements in Primorsky Krai. Historian Amir Khisamutdinov wrote that its history began as a post founded in 1860, consisting of the 3rd linear battalion. The Razdolnensky garrison was reinforced, a rifle battalion was stationed here, which was transformed by the arrival of Tsarevich Nikolai in 1891 into the 1st rifle regiment of His Imperial Majesty, the East Siberian spark telegraph company, 1st, 2nd, 3rd flying regiments, 6 1st Military Construction Commission, Primorsky Dragoon Regiment. During the First World War, prisoners of war of enemy powers, mainly from Austria-Hungary, lived in Razdolnoye.

On October 22, 1907, consecration of a new stone school took place in the village. At the beginning of 1867 the settlement had 611 inhabitants, including 331 males and 280 females. As of January 1, 1868, there were only five households with 24 inhabitants (15 men and 9 women). In 1902, there were 62 courtyards, 86 residential buildings and 493 residents from 139 families in Razdolny. As of January 1, 1907, there were 161 households and 570 inhabitants in the village, 299 men and 271 women. In 1909, there were 94 yards in Razdolny, 134 school-age children. In 1910, there were 40 Korean households in Razdolnoe. The area of their compact residence, as in other parts of the region, was called the Korean settlement.
