= Khalim Nigmatullin =

Russian ice hockey player

- Born: March 30, 1972 (age 52); Kazan, Russian SFSR, Soviet Union
- Height: 5 ft 9 in (175 cm)
- Weight: 187 lb (85 kg; 13 st 5 lb)
- Position: Defence
- Shot: Right
- Played for: Neftyanik Almetyevsk; Sokol Novocheboksarsk; Itil Kazan; TAN Kazan; HC Neftekhimik Nizhnekamsk; Rubin Tyumen; Ak Bars Kazan; Severstal Cherepovets; Khimik Voskresensk
- Playing career: 1989–2010

Khalim Nigmatullin (born March 30, 1972) is a Russian and Soviet former professional ice hockey defenceman, who became a coach after completing his career as a player.

== Awards and honors ==
Award	Year
Russian Superleague
Champion (Ak Bars Kazan)	1998
