= Moulin rouge (magazine) =

Russian men's magazine

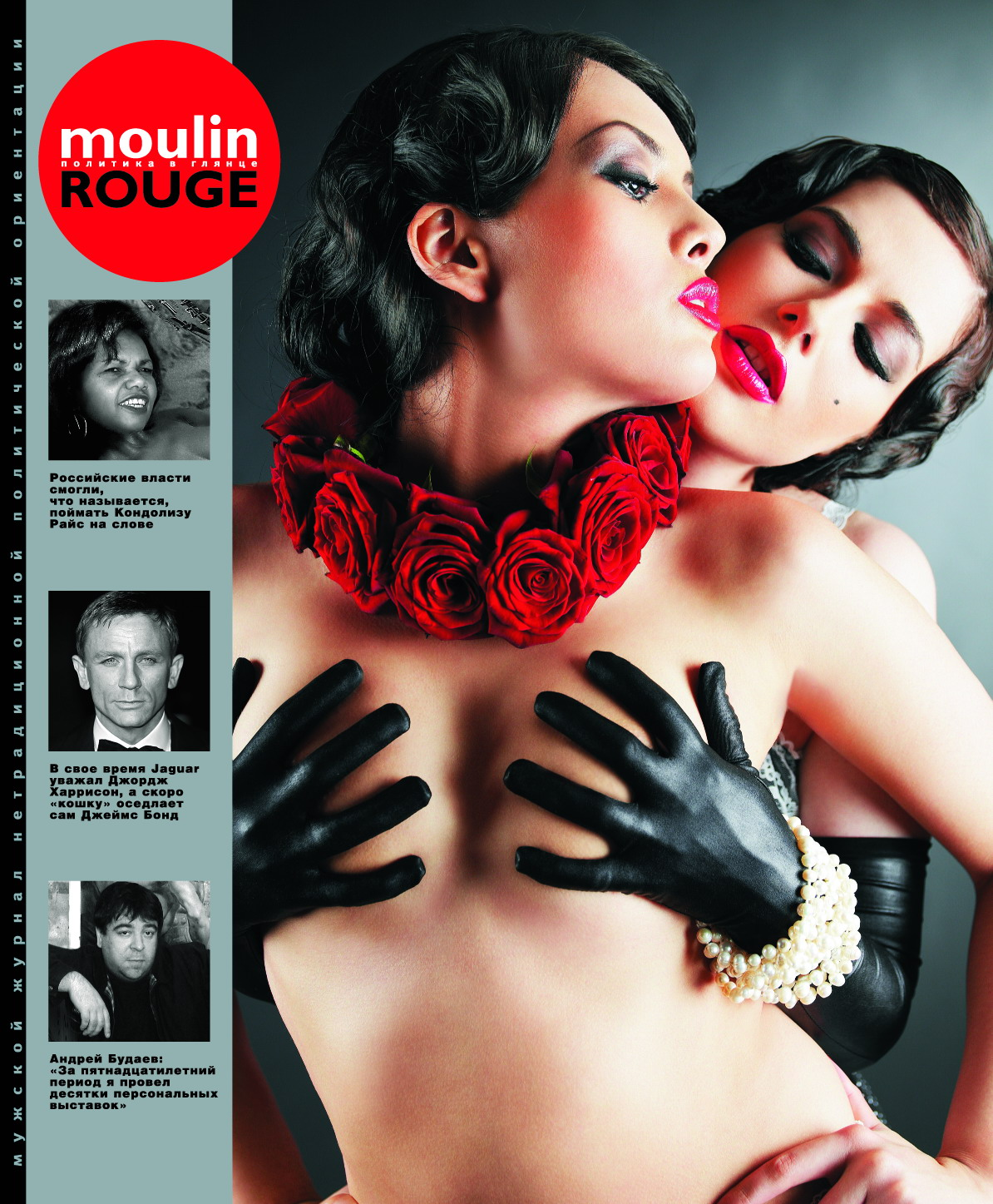
- Editor: Dmitrii Bykov
- Categories: Men's magazine
- Frequency: Monthly
- Publisher: Rodionov Publishing House
- Founded: 2003
- Final issue: 2008
- Country: Russia
- Language: Russian
- Website: moulin-rouge.telion.ru

Moulin rouge was a gloss men's magazine in Russia. It was published by Rodionov Publishing House from 2003 to 2008.
