= Boris Durov =

Soviet and Russian film director and screenwriter

- Born: Boris Valentinovich Durov; January 12, 1937; Sloviansk, Donetsk Oblast, Ukrainian SSR, USSR
- Died: 5 April 2007 (aged 70); Moscow, Russia
- Occupations: Film director, screenwriter
- Notable work: Pirates of the 20th Century (1979)

Boris Valentinovich Durov (Russian: Борис Валентинович Дуров; 12 March 1937 – 5 April 2007) was a Soviet and Russian film director and screenwriter. His 1979 action film Pirates of the 20th Century became the highest-grossing Soviet movie of all time. He was named Merited Artist of the Russian Federation in 2000.

== Biography ==
Boris Durov was born in Sloviansk, Ukrainian SSR (modern-day Ukraine). He finished the Kazan Suvorov Military School in 1955 and the Riga Higher Military Aviation Engineering School in 1960. At that point he decided not to continue the military career and entered the director's faculty at VGIK. He studied under Yakov Segel along with Stanislav Govorukhin.

Upon graduation in 1967 they co-directed their first feature film: Vertical. It was one of the first Soviet movies dedicated to mountaineering and also featured Vladimir Vysotsky in a minor role. As Vysotsky later recalled, "it was my first movie in the sense that I worked as an author (for the first time I wrote songs for a movie) – I was the author of both songs and music". All songs turned into instant hits, they were released by the Melodiya record label on the extended play and basically started Vysotsky's musical career. The movie itself became one of the leaders of the 1967 Soviet box office, reaching the 13th place (10th place among Soviet-produced movies) with 32.8 million viewers.

Since then Durov had worked at various studios (Odessa Film Studio, Studio Ekran, Gorky Film Studio, Moldova-Film) directing movies in various genres, from drama and comedy to adventure and children's films. Yet none of them matched the success of his first film or that of Govorukhin's movies. In 1979 they teamed up again and wrote a screenplay for what would be known as the first Soviet action film – Pirates of the 20th Century.

Shot in Crimea, it featured an action-packed plot about a Soviet cargo ship seized by modern-day pirates. It was based on real-life events that took place during the 1950-1970s when Taiwanese pirates attacked passing ships, including the Soviet ones. Since the information about Soviet ships wasn't published in domestic press, the authors based their screenplay on the story about the attack on the Italian ship that happened at the end of the 1970s when all crew members were killed.

Nevertheless, as Durov later told, "from the very beginning we decided to avoid sentimentality. We came up with a movie about Russian men who are able to defend their women, their ship. At that time the screenplay had to went through censorship. That's when uranium was cut out. Then we suggested to load the ship with opium meant for the pharmaceutical industry – it cost millions. This led to an uproar: no drugs, it's propaganda!.. After all, the screenwriters managed to defend opium".

Apart from gunfights and stunts the film featured karate fighting, for the first time in the Soviet cinema. While it was finished in 1979 and could've been released the same year, Goskino found it to be too violent and was afraid to screen it; only after Leonid Brezhnev watched the movie and became very touched by it, it was released to an overwhelming success. Seen by 87.6 million viewers at the year of release, it turned into an absolute Soviet box-office leader.

Durov's next drama movie I Cannot Say "Farewell" was also very successful: with 34.6 million viewers it became the 4th most popular Soviet movie of 1982. He continued experimenting in various genres, however, he never managed to repeat the success of his past films. After 1991 he left the industry and returned only in 2002 to direct the Russian detective mini-series The Secret Sign for the TNT channel.

Boris Durov died on 5 April 2007 aged 70, several years after surviving a stroke. He was buried at the Mitinskoe Cemetery in Moscow near his wife, an artist Zinaida Nikolaevna Durova (1937–2003).

== Selected filmography ==
Year	Title	Original title			
Year	Title	Original title	Director	Screenwriter	Notes
1967	Vertical	Вертикаль	✓		co-directed with Stanislav Govorukhin
1969	A Novel About a Chekist	Повесть о чекисте	✓		co-directed with Stepan Puchinyan
1972	This Is My Village	Вот моя деревня	✓	✓	
1979	Pirates of the 20th Century	Пираты XX века	✓	✓	
1982	I Cannot Say "Farewell"	Не могу сказать «прощай»	✓		
1984	Leader	Лидер	✓		
1986	Hello, Gulnara Rakhimovna!	Здравствуйте, Гульнора Рахимовна!			actor (physical culture teacher)
1990	Black Magic, or A Date with the Devil	Чёрная магия, или Свидание с дьяволом	✓		co-directed with Yuli Muzyka
2002	The Secret Sign	Тайный знак	✓		TV series
