= Yuri Vyshinsky =

Russian film director (1923–1990)

- Born: Yuri Mikhailovich Vyshinsky; September 24, 1923; Zlatoust, Soviet Union
- Died: January 10, 1990 (aged 66); Moscow, Soviet Union
- Occupations: Film director, screenwriter
- Years active: 1948–1990

Yuri Mikhailovich Vyshinsky (Russian: Юрий Михайлович Вышинский; 24 September 1923 – 10 January 1990) was a Soviet and Russian film director and screenwriter. Honoured Worker of the Arts Industry of the RSFSR (1983).

== Biography ==
Vyshinsky was born in the city of Zlatoust in Chelyabinsk region. After graduating from high school, he entered the Odesa Institute of Water Transport Engineers.

On July 15, 1941 he voluntarily joined the Red Army, became a cadet at the flight school in the city of Rostov-on-Don, and upon graduation became a fighter pilot of the Second Guards Fighter Leningrad Aviation Corps. In January 1945, during a combat sortie, he was seriously wounded.

In 1945, after the end of World War II, he entered the All-Union State Institute of Cinematography (VGIK, now Gerasimov Institute of Cinematography), where he studied in the workroom of Igor Savchenko and graduated from the directing department cum laude in 1951. He worked at film studios of Alexander Dovzhenko, and later, at the Gorky Film Studio. Since 1953 he worked at the Mosfilm. He joined the CPSU in 1949.

Vyshinsky's directorial debut, a full-length color adventure film, In the Square 45 (Russian: В квадрате 45), is dedicated to the work of aviators in peacetime. From 1956 to 1960, Vyshinsky dubbed more than twenty feature films and shot a full-length documentary, Our District (Russian: Наш район).

In April 1962, on the first anniversary of Yuri Gagarin's space flight, Vyshinsky's movie The Submarine was released. It takes place aboard a U.S. submarine off the coast of Cuba during the first crewed space flight.

In 1963, the black-and-white movie novel Appassionata (Russian: Аппасионата), based on the essay V. I. Lenin by Maxim Gorky. The television version of the film received the Golden Lotus prize at the Second International Film Festival in Alexandria, Egypt in 1963. The theme of the Russian revolution was continued by the feature drama The Salvos of the Aurora Cruiser (1965).

In 1970, Vyshinsky turned to the genre of adventure film and created the movie When the Fog Dissipates (Russian: Когда расходится туман) based on the eponymous novel by Anatoly Kleschenko, and in 1974 he filmed an adaptation of Alexander Stein’s play The Ocean (Russian: Океан) about Soviet sailors.

White Snow of Russia (1980), Vyshinsky's last movie about the Russian émigré chess player Alexander Alekhine, was the result of many years of research and the collection of materials about the fates of prominent figures of the post-1917 Russian emigration (the original script covered three Russian celebrities abroad - Alexander Vertinsky, Aleksandr Kuprin and Alexander Alekhine). The movie raises issues such as Man and His Homeland, Citizen and Artist.

Vyshinsky died in 1990 in Moscow. He was buried at the Khovansky Cemetery in Moscow.

== Partial filmography ==
- The Salvos of the Aurora Cruiser (1965) - director, screenwriter
- White Snow of Russia (1980) - director, screenwriter
