= Larisa Malevannaya =

- Born: Larisa Ivanovna Malevannaya; 22 January 1939 (age 87); Fedorovka, Neklinovsky District, Rostov Oblast, USSR
- Occupation: actress
- Years active: 1965–present
- Awards: Honored Artist of the RSFSR; People's Artist of the RSFSR; Medal of Pushkin

Larisa Ivanovna Malevannaya (Russian: Лари́са Ива́новна Малева́нная) is a Russian film and theater actress, theater director, and writer.

== Biography and career ==
Malevannaya was born on January 22, 1939, in the village of Fedorovka Neklinovsky District of Rostov Oblast. Initially, she graduated from a pedagogical institute and only after that she went to study at a theater academy. In 1965 Malevannaya graduated from the Russian State Institute of Performing Arts (directing course of Alexander Musil and acting course of Arkady Katzman). Since 1965 she has worked in the Krasnoyarsk Youth Theater as an actress and director. Around this time Malevannaya married director Gennady Oporkov.

In 1968 Malevannaya moved to Leningrad and began working at the Lensoviet Academic Theatre. In 1971 she transferred to the Leningrad Theater of the Lenin Komsomol, where her husband was appointed as chief director. Malevannaya split from her husband in the year 1976. At the invitation of George Tovstonogov, she transferred to the Bolshoi Drama Theater where she worked until 2007. In the years 1984–1988, Malevannaya was employed at the Leningrad State Institute of Theatre, Music and Cinematography in the position of associate professor of acting, as a course supervisor. In 1988 she released an acting course.

Malevannaya at the BDT staged the theater play "Daughter" by Valentine Krymka, as well as "Sparklers", by Arkady Averchenko in the year 1984. From 1988 to 1993, Malevannaya was head of the Municipal Drama Theater of Vasilyevsky Island.

She is also an author of three published books.

== Personal life ==
Malevannaya's first marriage was at the age of 23 to the theater director Gennady Oporkov. They divorced because of his infidelity. They had one child from the marriage, son Alexander Oporkov, who works as a programmer. Malevannaya has three grandchildren. To her second husband Larisa Malevannaya was married for twenty years, after which they divorced.

== Selected filmography ==
- Late Dates (Поздние свидания, 1980) as Vera
- Rafferty (Russian: Рафферти, 1980) as Martha
- Intergirl (Интердевочка, 1989) as Alla Sergeyevna Zaytseva
- Encore, Once More Encore! (Анкор, еще анкор!, 1992) as Tamara Vladimirovna Vinogradova
- The Idiot (Идиот, 2003) as general Ivolgin's wife
- Gold Field (Прииск, 2006) as Olga Sluzhaeva
- The Admiral (Адмирал, 2008) as admiral Essen's wife
- Home (Дом, 2011) as Nadezhda Shamanova
- Ottepel (Оттепель, 2013) as grandmother Zoya
- Two Women (Две женщины, 2014) as Anna Semyonovna Islaeva
- The Crimean Bridge. Made with Love! (Крымский мост. Сделано с любовью!, 2018) as Raisa

== Awards ==
- Honored Artist of RSFSR (1975)
- People's Artist of the RSFSR (1985)
- Medal of Pushkin
