= Late Dates =

- Russian: Поздние свидания
- Directed by: Vladimir Grigoryev
- Written by: Aleksei Gabrilovich; Yevgeny Gabrilovich
- Starring: Larisa Malevannaya; Yuri Platonov; Yekaterina Vasilyeva; Sergey Nikonenko; Alina Olkhovaya
- Cinematography: Valeri Mironov
- Music by: Vadim Bibergan
- Release date: 1980
- Running time: 100 minute
- Country: Soviet Union
- Language: Russian

Late Dates (Russian: Поздние свидания) is a 1980 Soviet melodrama directed by Vladimir Grigoryev.

== Plot ==
The film tells about a village girl who moves to Leningrad, graduates from the institute with the difference, defends her thesis, but was never able to achieve success in her personal life.

== Cast ==
- Larisa Malevannaya as Vera
- Yuri Platonov as Nikolai
- Yekaterina Vasilyeva as Doctor
- Sergey Nikonenko as Kukushkin
- Alina Olkhovaya as Anna
- Aleksandr Chaban as Mikhail
- Galina Simonova as Lena (as Galina Shchepetnova)
- Pyotr Shelokhonov as Lena's father
- Oleg Palmov as Makarov
- Viktor Gogolev
