= Shaken's Stars =

2003 Kazakh film festival

The Shaken's Stars International Film Festival (Kazakh: Шәкен Жұлдыздары, translit. Shaken Zhuldyzdary), is the film festival first held in Almaty, Kazakhstan in 2003. The festival takes place in May and has been held annually since 2003. It is named after the Kazakh actor and director Shaken Aimanov.

The Festival's priority is to support and help young artists and filmmakers. It is the only film festival in Central Asia that promotes and focuses on young talents. Every year the festival welcomes around 50 filmmakers from all over the world.

The president of the festival is Kazakh actor Asanali Ashimov; the director of the festival is Kazakh actress Venera Nigmatulina. The Festival's guests have been Peter Greenaway, Dev Patel, Michael Madsen, Mark Dacascos, Jason Scott Lee.

Last time the festival was held in 2018.

== Awards ==
The most prestigious award given out at Shaken's Stars is the Grand Prix for the best film.

Competition

- Young talent. Narrative, narrative short, documentary, documentary short.
- Debut. Narrative and documentary
- Student film. Narrative and documentary.
- Animation. Feature and short

Overall around 15 young filmmakers are awarded every year.

Past winners include following young directors: Klaus Härö, Srdan Golubović, Janus Metz Pedersen, Ilmar Raag, Eran Kolirin, Erika Hnikova, Laurent Hasse, Jaroslav Vojtek, Mara Tuleutayeva, Katarzyna Roslaniec, Sarah Cunningham, Dmitri Mamulia, Sabit Kurmanbekov.
