= White Snow of Russia =

- Russian poster
- Russian: Белый снег России
- Directed by: Yuri Vyshinsky
- Written by: Aleksandr Kotov; Yuri Vyshinsky
- Starring: Aleksandr Mikhaylov; Vladimir Samoylov; Yuri Kayurov; Natalya Gundareva; Krystyna Mikolajewska
- Cinematography: Sergey Vronskiy
- Edited by: Lyudmila Yelyan
- Music by: Aleksandr Flyarkovsky
- Production company: Mosfilm
- Release date: 1980
- Running time: 91 min.
- Country: Soviet Union
- Language: Russian

White Snow of Russia (Russian: Белый снег России) is a 1980 Soviet biographical drama film directed by Yuri Vyshinsky.

== Plot ==
The film is about chess player Alexander Alekhine, who becomes the world champion.

== Details ==
Runtime: 91 minutes

Country: Soviet Union

Language: Russian

Release Date: March 2, 1981

Also Known As: Belyy sneg Rossii

== Cast ==
- Aleksandr Mikhaylov as Alexander Alekhine
- Vladimir Samoylov as Aleksandr Kuprin
- Yuri Kayurov as Nikolai Krylenko
- Natalya Gundareva as Nadezhda
- Krystyna Mikolajewska as Grace Wishard
- Vsevolod Yakut as Emanuel Lasker
- Boris Galkin as Salo Flohr
- Aleksandr Goloborodko as Valentin Volyanksy
- Olegar Fedoro as Mikhailov
- Vladimir Pitsek as Francisco Lupi
- Aleksandr Pashutin as Semyonov
