= Pyotr Velyaminov =

Soviet Russian film and theater actor (1926–2009)

- Born: Pyotr Sergeevich Velyaminov; 7 December 1926; Moscow, RSFSR, USSR
- Died: 14 June 2009 (aged 82); St. Petersburg, Russia
- Occupation: Actor
- Years active: 1955—2009
- Spouse(s): Lyudmila Nyuhalova (divorce); Galina Grishina (divorce); Tatiana Tanakova

Pyotr Sergeevich Velyaminov (Russian: Пётр Серге́евич Вельями́нов; 1926–2009) was a Soviet Russian film and theater actor who was awarded the title People's Artist of the RSFSR. Commander of Order "For Merit to the Fatherland" 3rd class.

== Life ==
His father, Sergey Petrovich Velyaminov (1898-1976), was from a hereditary military and ancient noble family, known from the 11th century. His mother was Tatiana Ermilovna (1893–1972).

Pyotr Velyaminov was arrested at the age of sixteen in 1943 charged with anti-communist activities and sentenced to a Gulag camp. He spent nine years at prison. Here he joined an amateur theatrical group. After his release in 1953 he began performing in the Abakan Drama Theatre.

He received the award People's Artist of the RSFSR in 1985 and also People's Artist of the Chuvash Republic.

He had three children, including a son Sergei Velyaminov (born 5 February 1964) who became an actor like his father. He was married to the daughter of popular Soviet actor Georgy Burkov.

He was buried on 17 June 2009 at Literatorskiye Jetty of Volkovo Cemetery in St. Petersburg.

== Selected filmography ==
- Commander of the Lucky 'Pike' (1972) as Aleksei Strogov
- Eternal Call (1973–1983) as Polycarp Kruzhilin
- Sweet Woman (1977) as Nikolai Kushakov
- Pirates of the 20th Century (1979) as Ivan Ilych, Soviet Captain
- Night Accident (1980) as Mitin
- Bandit Petersburg (2000) as Yegor
