= Pirates of the 20th Century =

- Soviet film poster
- Directed by: Boris Durov
- Written by: Boris Durov; Stanislav Govorukhin
- Starring: Nikolai Yeremenko Jr. Pyotr Velyaminov; Talgat Nigmatulin
- Cinematography: Aleksandr Rybin
- Edited by: G. Negelnitska
- Music by: Yevgeni Gevorgyan
- Distributed by: Gorky Film Studio
- Release date: July 14, 1980
- Running time: 81 minutes
- Country: Soviet Union
- Language: Russian

Pirates of the 20th Century (Russian: Пираты XX века, translit. Piraty XX veka) is a 1980 Soviet action/adventure film about modern piracy. The film was directed by Boris Durov, the story was written by Boris Durov and Stanislav Govorukhin.

The film was the leader of Soviet distribution in 1980 and had 87.6 million viewers. It was the highest grossing domestically produced film in the Soviet Union.

== Plot ==
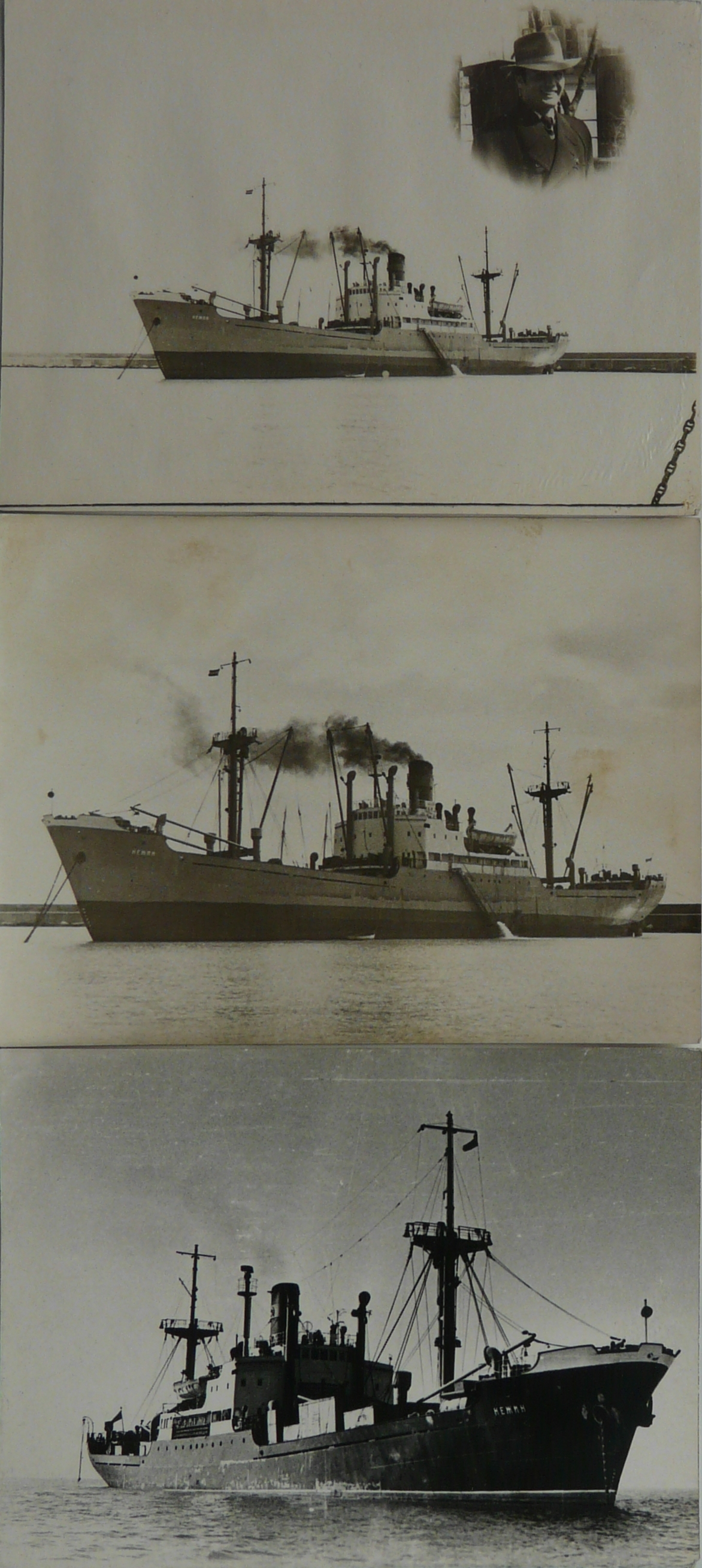
The existing dry cargo steamer «Нежин» (1954—1978) was built in 1954 and in the same shipyard in GDR that built the ship «Фатеж» which was used in filming under name «Нежин». The photos were made from November 1956 to January 1961.

The film begins with a convoy of military vehicles rolling into a seaport located somewhere in Middle East in the bank of Indian or Pacific Ocean and stopping near the pier where the Soviet cargo ship Nezhin is anchored. An agent of a local pharmaceutical company meets the captain of the Soviet vessel and discusses the cargo, medical opium, which is in critical demand by the hospitals of the USSR. Soon after that the pharmaceutical company agent is seen inside a car, speaking to someone via walkie-talkie. Later the MV Nezhin, with the opium on board, leaves port for Vladivostok.

Some distance into the voyage, a watchman cries "man overboard" and the captain orders the engines stopped to rescue the stranded swimmer. The boat from Nezhin picks up an Asian man who identifies himself as Salekh, the only surviving sailor from a foreign merchant ship. Salekh told the crew that his ship suddenly capsized during a heavy storm and his crewmates were fighting for places in rescue boats. Shortly after that the Soviet captain is informed of an unknown ship, drifting nearby. The ship, called the Mercury, is apparently abandoned, with no crew visible and no activity on deck. The captain of the Nezhin decides to send four men to explore the ship and offer assistance to possible survivors.

However, the abandoned ship turns out to be a trap for the Soviets. Occupied with the Mercury, none of the Russian crewmen pays any attention to Salekh, who takes an axe from the ship's firefighting kit, enters the radio room of the Nezhin, and attacks a radio operator, killing him. After Salekh destroys the ship's radio equipment, the Mercury starts her engines and approaches the Nezhin. At that moment, the Nezhin's crew see the bodies of the boarding party, floating in the water behind the Mercury. The Soviet captain realizes that his ship is under attack by pirates.

Their attempt to escape is foiled when the Mercury rams the ship and the pirates open fire with assault rifles and machine guns. The pirates board the Nezhin, brutally killing Russian crew members who fight them. Sergey, the chief-mate of the Nezhin, discovers the dead radio operator and decides to find Salekh. Chasing Salekh through the corridors of the ship, Sergey makes an attempt to stop him. Salekh shows impressive martial arts skills and quickly defeats the chief-mate. Soon after, the pirates lock the remaining Russians into crew compartments and begin to offload the opium to the Mercury. The pirate captain thanks Salekh for a successful mission and orders him to blow up the Nezhin together with her crew.

The surviving crew, left to die on their sinking ship, manage to escape into a lifeboat. They eventually drift onto a small island, where the pirates have taken over a fishing village. The crew encounter one of the fisherman’s escaped daughters, and together they make a plan to fight the pirates. Under cover of night, the group boards the pirates’ boat, and engage in a firefight. Eventually they take over the ship, discovering the pirates’ stash of cash in the captain’s safe. However, a later meeting reveals the pirates have both an essential piece to the radio and kidnapped two of the crew as hostages. The group negotiates a trade where the pirates get the ship in exchange for the hostages and a speedboat. But soon after setting out the engine dies, revealing the pirates sabotaged the boat to prevent the crew’s escape. As the pirates close in, Sergei sneaks aboard their ship and forces the radio operator at gunpoint to send out a distress signal with their coordinates. He then proceeds to the engine room and turns the engines full astern, crashing the ship into the rocks and killing all the pirates. Returning to the speedboat, the crew have fixed the engine and head out into the open sea, as the fisherman’s daughter waves goodbye from the island’s cliffs.

== Cast ==
- Nikolai Yeremenko Jr. as Sergey Sergeyevich (Chief Engineer)
- Pyotr Velyaminov as Ivan Ilych (Soviet Captain)
- Talgat Nigmatulin as Salekh
- Rein Aren as Captain of Pirates
- Dilorom Kambarova as Island girl
- Natalya Khorokhorina as Mascha
- Igor Kashintsev as Agent Lotus
- Dzhigangir Shakhmuradov as Noah
- Igor Klass as Joachim Schweiggert
- Tadeush Kasyanov as Bosun
- Maija Eglīte as Aina
- Alexander Bespaly as Chief mate
- Viktor Zhiganov as Igor Stetsenko
- Georgy Martirosyan as Georgiy Kluyev
- Leonid Trutnev as Radio operator
- Vladimir Smirnov as Political commissar
- Viktor Gordeyev as Yura Mikosha
- Vladimir Yepiskoposyan as Bearded pirate
- Farkhat Aminov

== See also ==
- A Hijacking, a 2012 film on piracy in the Indian Ocean
- Captain Phillips, a 2013 American thriller about modern-day piracy off Somalia, directed by Paul Greengrass, starring Tom Hanks and Barkhad Abdi
- Survival film
