= Night Accident (1980 film) =

1980 film

- Russian: Ночное происшествие
- Directed by: Venyamin Dorman
- Written by: Vladlen Bakhnov
- Starring: Pyotr Velyaminov; Galina Polskikh; Aleksey Zharkov; Yuriy Kayurov; Boris Smorchkov
- Cinematography: Vadim Kornilyev
- Music by: Aleksey Rybnikov
- Release date: 1980
- Running time: 91 minute
- Country: Soviet Union
- Language: Russian

Night Accident (Russian: Ночное происшествие) is a 1980 Soviet crime film directed by Venyamin Dorman.

== Plot ==
In a Moscow alley, a young couple finds an injured woman with a head wound and takes her to the police station. The woman, Galina Semyonovna Ukladova, claims she was attacked by a taxi driver who stole a large sum of money and her documents. The taxi driver, Stepan Voronov—who has a previous record—is arrested, and Ukladova identifies him as her assailant. Although all evidence points to Voronov’s guilt, experienced investigator Sergey Mitin senses something deeper behind this ordinary crime. He later uncovers that Ukladova is actually a seasoned criminal, Lidiya Vasilyevna Pletnyova, who staged the "attack" to obtain new documents and a fresh identity after stealing 35,000 rubles from a construction site near Irkutsk.

== Cast ==
- Pyotr Velyaminov as Mitin
- Galina Polskikh as Galina Ukladova
- Aleksey Zharkov as Stepan Voronov
- Yuriy Kayurov as Vladykin
- Boris Smorchkov as Babin
- Valentina Grushina as Sirotina
- Natalya Nazarova as Simukova
- Tatyana Pelttser as Aleksandra Alekseyevna
- Yury Volyntsev as Astakhov (as Yuri Volyntsev)
- Darya Mikhaylova
