= Talgat Nigmatulin =

Soviet actor (1949–1985)

- Talgat Nigmatulin
- Born: Talgat Kadyrovich Nigmatulin; March 5, 1949; Kyzyl-Kiya, Kirghiz SSR, USSR
- Died: February 11, 1985 (aged 35); Vilnius, Lithuanian SSR, USSR

Talgat Kadyrovich Nigmatulin (Tatar: Təlğət Qadıyr uğlı Niğmətulin, Russian: Талга́т Кады́рович Нигмату́лин; 5 March 1949, in Kyzyl-Kiya – 11 February 1985, in Vilnius) was a famous Soviet actor and martial artist. Nigmatullin was born on October 5, 1949, in a Tatar-Uzbek family in Kirgizia. He took part in many action movies. Perhaps his most famous movie was Pirates of the 20th Century. He also appeared in other films as shown below.

== Selected filmography ==
- 1969 — Her Name is Spring (Russian: Её имя — Весна) as Pulat Sadykov
- 1971 — The Night At the 14th Parallel as Sitong
- 1972 — The Seventh Bullet (Седьмая пуля) as Ismail
- 1977 — Armed and Dangerous (Вооружен и очень опасен) as Joyce
- 1979 — Pirates of the 20th Century (Пираты 20-ого века) as Salikh
- 1981 — The Right to Shoot as captain of the schooner Kiyoshi
- 1981 — The Adventures of Tom Sawyer and Huckleberry Finn (Приключения Тома Сойера и Гекльберри Финна) as Injun Joe
- 1983 — The Wolf Pit (Волчья яма) as Samat Kasimov
- 1984 — Lonely and Unarmed (Один и без оружия) as Khan
- 1985 — Confrontation (Противостояние) as Urazbaev, a police captain in Kokand

== Death ==
Nigmatulin became a follower of Abai Borubayev, a teacher from Central Asia who had found favour with Moscow art circles, and was murdered in 1985 by other followers of Borubayev, in the latter's presence.
