= List of Soviet films of 1957 =

A list of films produced in the Soviet Union in 1957 (see 1957 in film).

== 1957 ==
Title	Russian title	Director	Cast	Genre	Notes
1957
And Quiet Flows the Don	Тихий Дон	Sergei Gerasimov	Pyotr Glebov, Elina Bystritskaya, Zinaida Kiriyenko, Lyudmila Khityaeva	Drama	
Close to Us	Рядом с нами	Adolf Bergunker	Leonid Bykov	Drama	
The Cranes are Flying	Летят журавли	Mikhail Kalatozov	Tatyana Samojlova, Aleksey Batalov, Vasili Merkuryev, Aleksandr Shvorin	War film	Won the Palme d'Or at the 1958 Cannes Film Festival
Don Quixote	Дон Кихот	Grigori Kozintsev	Nikolai Cherkasov, Yuri Tolubeyev	Drama	Entered into the 1957 Cannes Film Festival
Duel	Поединок	Vladimir Petrov	Nikolai Komissarov	Drama	
Ekaterina Voronina	Екатерина Воронина	Isidor Annensky	Lyudmila Khityaeva	Drama	
The Girl Without an Address	Девушка без адреса	Eldar Ryazanov	Svetlana Karpinskaya, Nikolai Rybnikov, Erast Garin	Romantic comedy	
Gutta-percha Boy	Гуттаперчевый мальчик	Vladimir Gerasimov	Sasha Popov, Alexey Gribov, Mikhail Nazvanov	Drama	
The Height	Высота	Aleksandr Zarkhi	Nikolai Rybnikov, Inna Makarova	Melodrama	Foundation of the bard movement in further 1960s
The House I Live In	Дом, в котором я живу	Lev Kulidzhanov, Yakov Segel	Vladimir Zemlyanikin, Yevgeny Matveyev	War film	
It Happened in Penkovo	Дело было в Пенькове	Stanislav Rostotsky	Maya Menglet	Drama	
Journey Beyond Three Seas	Хождение за три моря	Khwaja Ahmad Abbas, Vasili Pronin	Oleg Strizhenov, Nargis Dutt, Prithviraj Kapoor, Balraj Sahni, Bharat Bhushan, Manmohan Krishna	Adventure, history	Soviet-Indian co-production. Entered into the 1958 Cannes Film Festival
Leningrad Symphony	Ленинградская симфония	Zakhar Agranenko	Vladimir Solovyov	Drama	
A Lesson in History	Урок истории	Lev Arnshtam, Hristo Piskov	Stefan Savov	Drama	Joint Soviet-Bulgarian production
Malva	Мальва	Vladimir Braun	Dzidra Ritenberga	Drama	
Miles of Fire	Огненные вёрсты	Samson Samsonov	Igor Savkin, Margarita Volodina	Adventure	
Road to the Stars	Дорога к звёздам	Pavel Klushantsev	Georgi Solovyov		
The Sisters	Сёстры	Grigori Roshal	Rufina Nifontova, Nikolai Gritsenko	Historical drama	The first part of a trilogy based on Aleksey Nikolayevich Tolstoy's novel The Road to Calvary.
The Snow Queen	Снежная королева	Lev Atamanov	Vladimir Gribkov	Animation	
Stories About Lenin	Рассказы о Ленине	Sergei Yutkevich	Maksim Shtraukh	Drama	
Street Full of Surprises	Улица полна неожиданностей	Sergei Sidelyov	Leonid Kharitonov	Comedy	
Trubachyov's Detachment Is Fighting	Отряд Трубачёва сражается	Ilya Frez	Oleg Vishnev	Drama	
A Unique Spring	Неповторимая весна	Aleksandr Stolper	Yevgeniya Kozyreva, Izolda Izvitskaya, Aleksandr Mikhaylov	Drama	
An Unusual Summer	Необыкновенное лето	Vladimir Basov	Viktor Korshunov	Drama	
The Wrestler and the Clown	Борец и клоун	Boris Barnet, Konstantin Yudin	Stanislav Chekan	Drama	

== See also ==
- 1957 in the Soviet Union
