= Muza Krepkogorskaya =

Soviet actress

Muza Krepkogorskaya HAR
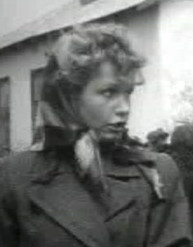
- Born: 9 July 1924; Moscow, Soviet Union
- Died: 26 June 1999 (aged 74); Moscow, Russia
- Occupation: Actress
- Years active: 1949-1999

Musa Viktorovna Krepkogorskaya (Russian: Муза Викторовна Крепкогорская; July 9, 1924, Moscow — June 26, 1999, Moscow) was a Soviet and Russian theater and film actress, Honored Artist of the RSFSR (1989).

Wife of actor Georgi Yumatov. They met at VGIK during the 1940s and lived together up till Yumatov's death. Krepkogorskaya was never as popular as her husband, even though he made sure that she was given at least minor roles in every movie he appeared in.

Muza Krepkogorskaya died on June 26, 1999. She was buried in Moscow at the Vagankovo Cemetery.

== Selected filmography ==
- It Happened in the Donbass (1945)
- The Train Goes East (1948) as Geologist (uncredited)
- The Young Guard (1948) as Pozarenko
- Glorious Path (1949) as Katya
- Happy Flight (1949) as Fenya's friend (uncredited)
- Bountiful Summer (1951) as Darka
- The Unforgettable Year 1919 (1951) as Liza
- Incident in the Taiga (1954) as Katya Volkova
- The Anna Cross (1954)
- World Champion (1955) as Zina
- Lyana (1955)
- Puti i sudby (1956) as Tonya
- Different Fortunes (1956) as Galya
- V pogone za slavoy (1957) as Zinochka Perepyolkina
- White Acacia (1957, TV Movie) as Katya
- Ocherednoy reys (1958) as Tosya
- Close to Us (1958)
- Ottsy i deti (1959) (uncredited)
- Tsarsuli zapkhuli (1959) as Tania
- Lyubovyu nado dorozhit (1960) as Polina Savchuk
- Dve zhizni (1961) as Frosya
- Akademik iz Askanii (1962) as Olga
- Vesyolye istorii (1962) as Zhena upravdoma
- Malchik moy! (1962) as Mariya Yevdokimovna
- The First Trolleybus (1963) as Klava - dispatcher
- Tale About the Lost Time (1964) as mama Peti
- Khotite - verte, khotite - net... (1964) as Dusya
- Chyornyy biznes (1965) as Tarakanova
- Don't Forget... Lugovaya Station (1967) as Irina Sergeyevna - brigadir poezda
- Fire, Water, and Brass Pipes (1968) as Sofyushka
- Yesli yest parusa (1969)
- Opekun (1971) as Tata
- Officers (1971) as Anna Vasilyevna
- Krasno solnyshko (1972) as Agnyusha
- Neylon 100% (1973) as Muza
- Earthly Love (1975) as Varya Chornaya
- Odinozhdy odin (1975) as tyotya Natasha
- It Can't Be! (1975) as Zhena pevtsa
- Shtorm na sushe (1976) as mama Fedi
- Practical Joke (1977) as Rufina Andreyevna
- Destiny (1977) as Varya Chyornaya
- Kot v meshke (1979)
- Moscow Does Not Believe in Tears (1980) as General's wife
- At the Beginning of Glorious Days (1980) as Vorobikha
- Sailors Have No Questions (1981) as Provodnitsa
- They Were Actors (1981) as Anna Kablukova
- Particularly Important Task (1981)
- Otstavnoy kozy barabanshchik (1982) as Nadyozhka
- Married Bachelor (1982) as Passazhirka s kotom
- Vtoroy raz v Krymu (1984)
- Dangerous for Your Life! (1985) as Chess Player
- Vnimaniye! Vsem postam... (1985) as Passazhirka
- Trips on an Old Car (1985) as Suflersha
- To Award (Posthumously) (1986)
- Pyat pisem proshchaniya (1988)
- Topinambury (1988)
- Private Detective, or Operation Cooperation (1990) as Sosedka
- Stalin's Funeral (1990) as Stalin's Maid
- Anna Karamazoff (1991)
- Grekh (1992) as Janitor Frosya
- Weather Is Good on Deribasovskaya, It Rains Again on Brighton Beach (1992) as Old woman in church
