= List of Soviet films of 1981 =

Title	Russian title	Director	Cast	Genre	Notes
1981
The Adventures of Sherlock Holmes and Dr. Watson	Приключения Шерлока Холмса и доктора Ватсона	Igor Maslennikov	Vasily Livanov, Vitaly Solomin, Rina Zelyonaya, Boryslav Brondukov	Crime	
Agony	Агония	Elem Klimov	Alexei Petrenko, Alisa Freindlich, Velta Līne, Anatoli Romashin	Biopic	
At the Beginning of Glorious Days	В начале славных дел	Sergey Gerasimov	Dmitri Zolotukhin, Tamara Makarova, Natalya Bondarchuk, Nikiolai Yeryemenko	Drama, history	
Carnival	Карнавал	Tatyana Lioznova	Irina Muravyova, Yury Yakovlev, Klara Luchko, Aleksandr Abdulov	Romantic comedy	
Could One Imagine?	Вам и не снилось...	Ilya Frez	Tatiana Aksyuta, Nikita Mikhailovskiy	Drama	
Crazy Money	Бешеные деньги	Vladimir Repnikov	Aleksandr Mikhailov	Comedy	
Per Aspera Ad Astra	Через тернии к звёздам	Richard Viktorov, Nikolai Viktorov	Yelena Metyolkina	Science fiction	
Everything's Backwards	Всё наоборот	Vladimir Grammatikov	Olga Mashnaya, Mikhail Efremov, Oleg Tabakov	Comedy, Romance	
Express on Fire	34-й скорый	Andrei Malyukov	Vasily Badaev	Disaster	
Cheers, My Dear!	Будь здоров, дорогой!	Tamaz Gomelauri	Vakhtang Kikabidze, Nikolai Rybnikov	Comedy	
Dusha	Душа	Alexander Stefanovich	Sofia Rotaru, Rolan Bykov, Mikhail Boyarsky, Vyacheslav Spesivtsev	Musical	
Faktas	Факт	Alimantas Grikiavicius	Regimantas Adomaitis, Donatas Banionis, Juozas Budraitis	War film	Entered into the 1981 Cannes Film Festival
Farewell	Прощание	Elem Klimov	Stefaniya Stanyuta	Drama	
Front in the Rear of the Enemy	Фронт в тылу врага	Igor Gostev and Victor Kulle	Vyacheslav Tikhonov	War	
Gypsy Happiness	Цыганское счастье	Sergey Nikonenko	Nikolay Kryuchkov	Drama	
The Hound of the Baskervilles	Собака Баскервилей	Igor Maslennikov	Vasily Livanov, Vitaly Solomin, Rina Zelyonaya, Borislav Brondukov	Crime	
Ladies Invite Gentlemen	Дамы приглашают кавалеров	Ivan Kiasashvili	Marina Neyolova, Leonid Kuravlyov, Natalya Andrejchenko	Comedy, Romance	
A Limousine The Colour Of Midsummer's Eve	Лимузин цвета белой ночи	Jānis Streičs	Lilita Bērziņa	Comedy	
Lenin in Paris	Ленин в Париже	Sergei Yutkevich	Yuriy Kayurov, Claude Jade	Biopic	
Little Alexander	Александр Маленький	Vladimir Fokin	Boris Tokarev	Drama	
Muzhiki!	Мужики!	Iskra Babich	Aleksandr Mikhajlov, Pyotr Glebov	Drama	Entered into the 32nd Berlin International Film Festival
The Mystery of the Third Planet	Тайна третьей планеты	Roman Kachanov	Olga Gromova	Animation	
The Old New Year	Cтаpый Нoвый	Naum Ardashnikov, Oleg Yefremov	Vyacheslav Nevinny, Alexander Kalyagin, Irina Miroshnichenko, Kseniya Minina	Comedy	
Say a Word for the Poor Hussar	О бедном гусаре замолвите слово	Eldar Ryazanov	Stanislav Sadalskiy, Oleg Basilashvili, Valentin Gaft, Yevgeny Leonov	Comedy, drama	
Starfall	Звездопад	Igor Talankin	Alla Demidova	Romance	
The Suicide Club, or the Adventures of a Titled Person	Клуб самоубийц, или Приключения титулованной особы	Evgeny Tatarsky	Oleg Dahl, Donatas Banionis	Adventure	
Otvetnyy khod	Ответный ход	Mikhail Tumanishvili		Action	
A Painter's Wife Portrait	Портрет жены художника	Aleksandr Pankratov	Valentina Telichkina	Romance	
Plasticine Crow	Пластилиновая ворона	Aleksandr Tatarskiy	Leonid Bronevoy	Animation	
Propavshiye sredi zhivykh	Пропавшие среди живых	Vladimir Fetin		Crime, Mystery	
Sashka	Сашка	Aleksandr Surin	Andrey Tashkov	War	
Family Relations	Родня	Nikita Mikhalkov	Nonna Mordyukova, Svetlana Kryuchkova, Yuri Bogatyryov	Drama	
The Sixth	Шестой	Samvel Gasparov	Sergei Nikonenko, Vladimir Grammatikov, Mikhail Pugovkin	Action	
Teheran 43	Тегеран-43	Aleksandr Alov and Vladimir Naumov	Natalya Belokhvostikova, Igor Kostolevsky, Armen Dzhigarkhanyan, Alain Delon, Claude Jade	Drama	Won the Golden Prize at the 12th Moscow International Film Festival
The Youth of Peter the Great	Юность Петра	Sergey Gerasimov	Dmitri Zolotukhin, Tamara Makarova, Natalya Bondarchuk, Nikiolai Yeryemenko	Drama, history	
They Were Actors	Они были актёрами	Georgy Natanson	Zinaida Kirienko	Adventure	
Three Times About Love	Трижды о любви	Viktor Tregubovich	Sergei Prokhanov	Drama	
Easy money	Бешенные деньги	Yevgeny Matveyev	Yelena Solovey	Drama	Film adaptation of Alexander Ostrovsky's play
Twenty Six Days from the Life of Dostoyevsky	Двадцать шесть дней из жизни Достоевского	Aleksandr Zarkhi	Anatoly Solonitsyn, Yevgeniya Simonova	Biopic	Solonitsyn won the Silver Bear for Best Actor at Berlin
Tree Dzhamal	Дерево Джамал	Khodzha Kuli Narliyev	Maya-Gozel Aimedova	Drama	Entered into the 12th Moscow International Film Festival
True of Lieutenant Klimov	Правда лейтенанта Климова	Oleg Dashkevich	Andrei Rostotsky	Drama	
The Vacancy	Вакансия	Margarita Mikaelyan	Leonid Kayurov	Comedy	
Valentina	Валентина	Gleb Panfilov	Rodion Nahapetov	Drama	
Vasili and Vasilisa	Василий и Василиса	Irina Poplavskaya	Olga Ostroumova	Drama	
Waiting for Love	Любимая женщина механика Гаврилова	Pyotr Todorovsky	Lyudmila Gurchenko, Sergey Shakurov, Svetlana Ponomareva, Natalya Nazarova	Romantic comedy	
