= Zinaida Kiriyenko =

Russian actress and singer (1933–2022)

- Зинаида Кириенко
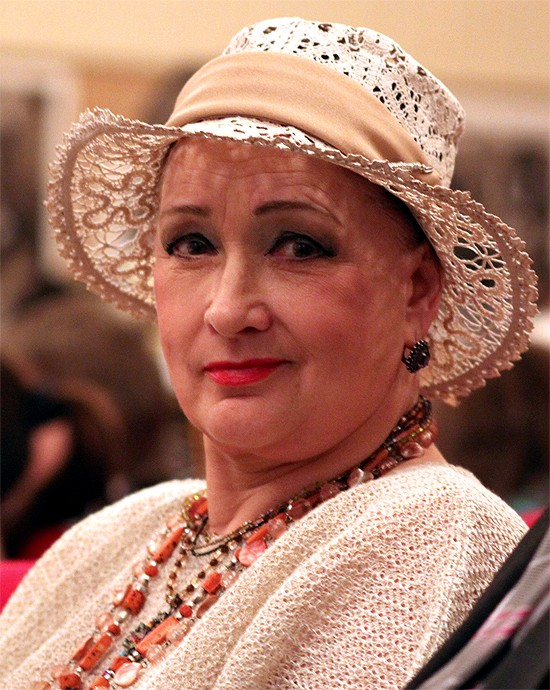
- Kiriyenko in 2010
- Born: Zinaida Georgievna Shirokova; 9 July 1933; Makhachkala, Dagestan ASSR, Russian SFSR, USSR
- Died: 12 February 2022 (aged 88); Moscow, Russia
- Resting place: Troyekurovskoye Cemetery
- Occupation: Actress
- Years active: 1954–2019

Zinaida Mikhailovna Kiriyenko (Russian: Зинаи́да Миха́йловна Кириенко; 9 July 1933 – 12 February 2022) was a Russian actress and singer.

She was Honored Artist of the RSFSR (1965), People's Artist of the RSFSR (1977) and was known for her roles in the films And Quiet Flows the Don, Fate of a Man, and Chronicle of Flaming Years.

== Biography ==
=== Early life ===
She was born in Makhachkala in 1933. When her mother was pregnant with her, she read the story "Aida" and fell in love with the main character after whom she decided to name her daughter. Her father, however, registered her as Zinaida, which upset her mother. Her parents were different people and separated when she was three years old. From her birth father she got her patronymic, but the surname Kirienko she has from her stepfather. Her father was taken away during the Stalinist repressions and she never saw him again.

Her family moved to Novopavlovskaya stanitsa in the Stavropol Krai, where her mother was sent to work as a grain elevator director. There Zinaida finished seven grades. She continued her secondary education first at a railway transport technical college, then at an agricultural college. Three years later she came to Moscow and got into VGIK, but only as a listener, without a scholarship or a dormitory. There she was noticed by Sergei Gerasimov, and a year later, in 1954, she managed to get into his course, despite the heavy competition – 539 people for one spot.

=== Career ===
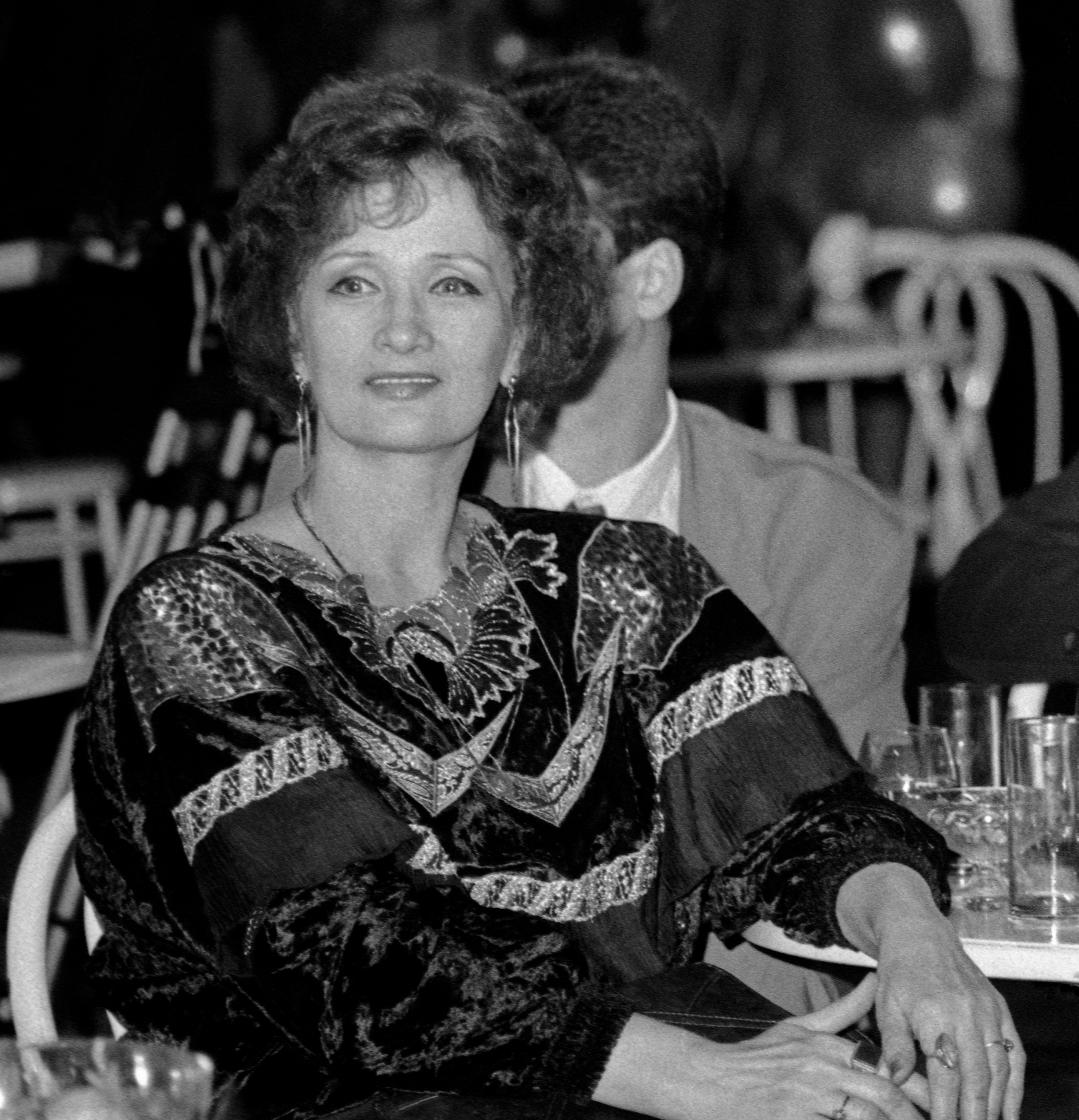
Kiriyenko seated in the audience of the first Miss Russia beauty pageant, 1993

At the end of her first year, Kiriyenko played in Gerasimov's short film "Hope". As she later realised, it was a test before the big job. In her third year, Gerasimov began filming And Quiet Flows the Don. She gained all-USSR fame after playing the role of Natalya in this movie. Before graduating in 1958, she starred in three more pictures - Poem of the Sea, The Magpie, Fate of a Man.

From 1958 to 1959, Zinaida worked in the Moscow Pushkin Drama Theatre. From 1961, she worked at the National Film Actors' Theatre for over thirty years.

The actress was not filmed for a long time. As she herself noted in interviews, this was due to a conflict with First Deputy Chairman of the State Committee for Cinematography Vladimir Baskakov, who blacklisted her. During the acting downtime, she traveled around cities and gave solo concerts, becoming famous as a singer.

Kiriyenko again rose to popularity after her role in the film Earthly Love, directed by Yevgeny Matveyev.

== Selected filmography ==
- And Quiet Flows the Don (1958) as Natalya
- Poem of the Sea (1958) as Katerina
- The Magpie (1958) as Aneta
- Fate of a Man (1959) as Irina
- Far from the Motherland (1960) as Monica Tarval
- Chronicle of Flaming Years (1960) as Maria
- The Cossacks (1961) as Maryana
- Meet Baluyev! (1963) as Kapa Podgornaya
- The Slowest Train (1963) as Nina Ivanovna
- The Enchanted Desna (1964) as Odarka
- Earthly Love (1974) as Efrosinya
- Destiny (1977) as Efrosinya
- They Were Actors (1981) as Aleksandra Fedorovna Peregonets
- Mr. Veliky Novgorod (1984) as Vera

== Personal life and death ==
=== Family ===
She met her husband Valery during the shooting of the film The Cossacks. They had two sons, five grandchildren and three great-grandchildren.

=== Death ===
On 10 February 2022, Kiriyenko was admitted to a Moscow hospital with a positive test for COVID-19. Whilst hospitalised, she suffered a stroke and died on 12 February 2022, at the age of 88, from COVID-19, during the COVID-19 pandemic in Russia.

== Honours and awards ==
- Honored Artist of the RSFSR (1965)
- People's Artist of the RSFSR (1977)
- USSR State Prize in the fields of literature, art and architecture for the Earthly love and Destiny dilogy (1979)
