= Igor Chernykh =

Soviet and Russian camera operator (1932–2020)

- Born: Igor Anatolievich Chernykh; 12 June 1932; Moscow, Russia
- Died: 15 July 2020 (aged 88); Moscow, Russia
- Occupation: cinematographer
- Years active: 1955–2020
- Awards: Honored Artist of the RSFSR (1988); Medal of the Order "For Merit to the Fatherland" (1997)

Igor Anatolievich Chernykh (June 12, 1932 – July 15, 2020) was a Soviet cinematographer. He was honored with Honored Artist of the RSFSR in 1988. He was best known for his works in The Diamond Arm, Particularly Important Task and Private Detective, or Operation Cooperation.

== Biography ==
Igor Chernykh was born on June 12, 1932 in Moscow. Finished his secondary education at Gymnasium No. 1 in Zhukovsky in 1950. Entered the cinematography department of the university of VGIK (workshop of A. V. Galperin). After graduation in 1955 started his career in Mosfilm as a director of photography.

He shot his first film in 1955. Overall, he has worked on more than 20 films in his career. He collaborated with such important for Soviet cinema directors as Leonid Gaidai, Alexei Saltykov, Yuri Ozerov and Yevgeny Matveev.

In his work he applied innovations, invented new things. For example, he is considered to be one of the creators of the first steadicam in the Soviet Union. In 1977, he independently developed a stabilisation system Gorizont, which was used to shoot some episodes of the films Emelyan Pugachev, Particularly Important Task and The Battle for Moscow. The device was used by other operators for another two decades. He was noted to be one of the first to accomplish underwater photography.

Chernykh died on July 15, 2020, in Moscow, aged 88.
