= Earthly Love =

- Movie poster Earthly Love
- Directed by: Yevgeny Matveyev
- Written by: Yevgeny Matveyev; Valentin Chernykh; Pyotr Proskurin
- Produced by: Anatoly Mironov
- Starring: Yevgeny Matveyev; Olga Ostroumova; Yury Yakovlev; Valeriya Zaklunna; Zinaida Kiriyenko
- Cinematography: Victor Yakushev; Genadiy Tsekaviy
- Edited by: Maria Kareva
- Music by: Yevgeny Ptichkin
- Production company: Mosfilm
- Release date: 24 April 1975
- Running time: 94 minutes
- Country: Soviet Union
- Language: Russian

Earthy Love (Russian: Любовь земная, romanized: Lyubov zemnaya) is a 1974 Soviet romantic drama film directed by Yevgeny Matveyev and starring Matveyev, Olga Ostroumova, and Yury Yakovlev. The film was a screen adaptation of Pyotr Proskurin's novel Earthy Love, and was viewed by 50.9 million spectators in 1975. Yevgeny Matveyev was honored with the State Prize of the RSFSR for Earthy Love and Destiny.

== Plot ==
A story about love, the late chairman of the collective farm Zakhar Derugin (Yevgeny Matveev) marries the young woman Maria Polivanova (Olga Ostroumova) at the height of the harvest. There is a parallel developing romance between Catherine and her sister Derugin secretary of the District Party Committee Bryukhanov. The film shows the life of the Soviet countryside in the 1930s.

== Cast ==
- Yevgeny Matveyev as Zakhar Deriugin
- Zinaida Kiriyenko as Efrosinya
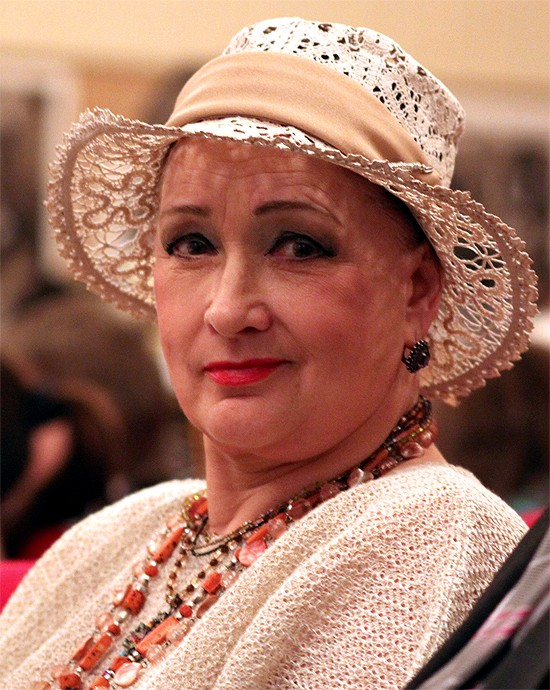
  Zinaida Kiriyenko
- Yury Yakovlev as Tikhon
- Valeriya Zaklunna as Katerina
- Olga Ostroumova as Manya
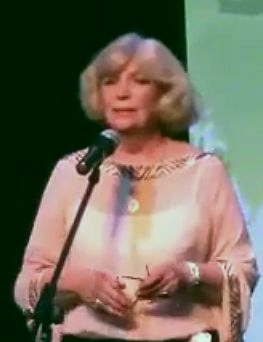
  Olga Ostroumova
- Irina Skobtseva as Elizaveta Polivanova
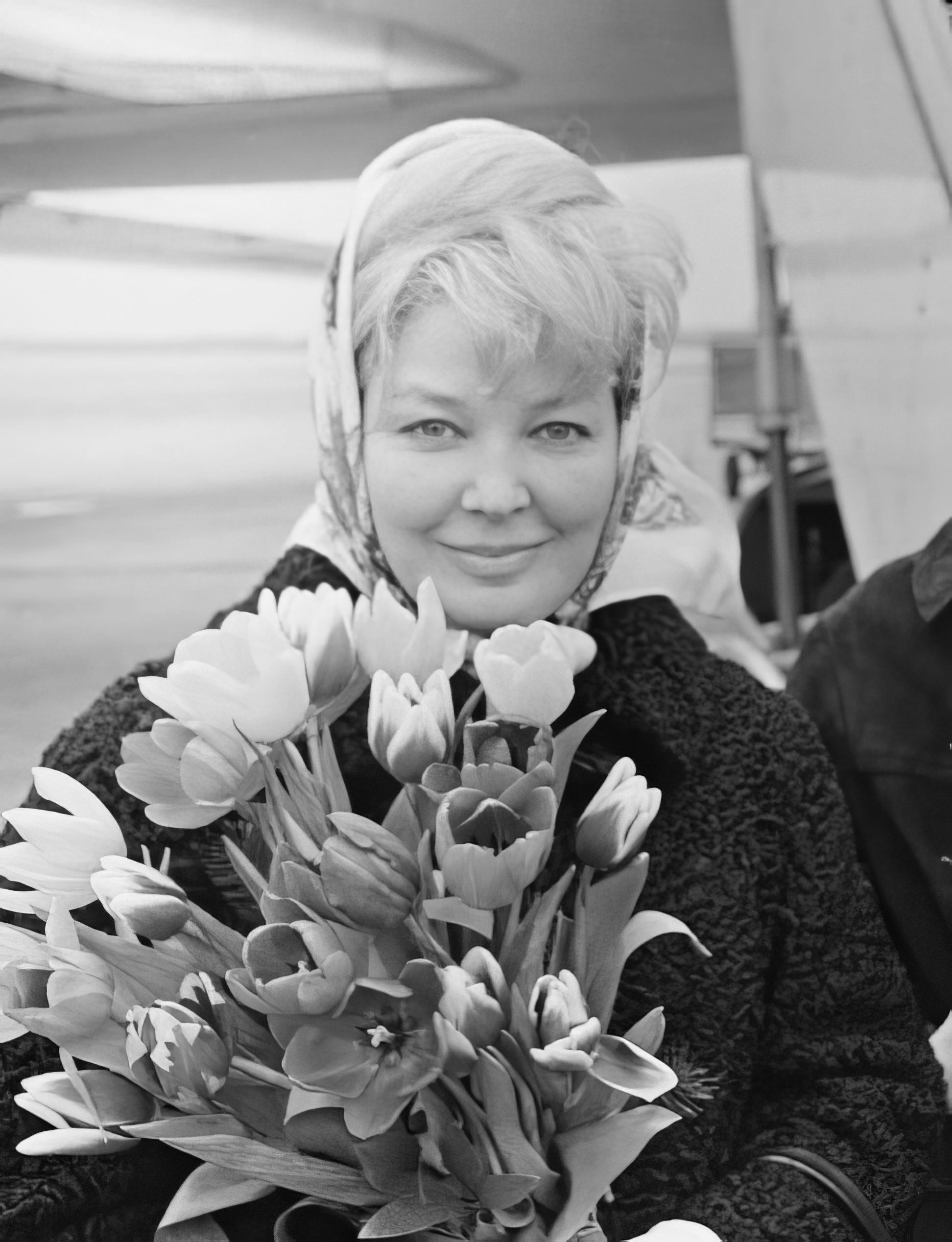
  Irina Skobtseva
- Viktor Khokhryakov as Chubarov
- Vladimir Samoilov as Rodion Anisimov
- Stanislav Chekan as Koshev
- Aleksandr Potapov as Nikita Bobok
- Muza Krepkogorskaya as Varya Chernaya
- Valentin Bryleyev as Kudelin
- Yuri Leonidov as Tikhomirov
- Vadim Spiridonov as Fyodor Makashin
- Ivan Bondar as Proshka
- Alexander Degtyar as supplier
- Roman Filippov as Baturin
- Zoya Isayeva as collective farmer
- Valentina Klyagina as Nadya
- Yura Kovalyov as episode
- Aleksandr Lebedev as Semyon
- Aleksandr Lukyanov as collective farmer
- Viktor Markin as episode
- Yuri Martynov as District Committee member
- Ivan Matveyev as a short collective farmer
- Grigory Mikhaylov as construction worker
- Vladimir Nosik as Yurka
- Lidiya Olshevskaya as Zakhar's mother
- Misha Orlov as episode
- Dmitri Orlovsky as District Committee member
- Valentina Pikalova as member of the Bureau of the District Committee
- Vladimir Pitsek as called on the Office of the District Committee
- Vladimir Plotnikov as Kiryan Polivanov
- Viktor Shulgin as District Committee member
- Nikolay Smorchkov as Vasily
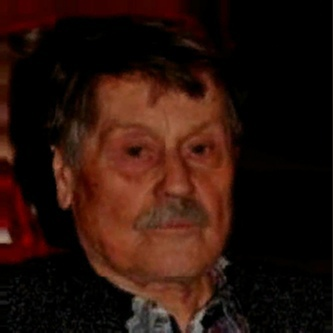
  Nikolay Smorchkov
- Lyubov Sokolova as District Committee member
- Viktor Uralsky as man at reception
- Valentina Ushakova as Nyurka Bobok
- Kirill Uspensky as episode
- Aleksandr Vigdorov as Mitry Polivanov
- Nikolai Vikulin as Vanya Deriugin
- Valentina Vladimirova as Nina Ivanovna, secretary of Bryukhanov
- Nikolai Yudin as grandfather Makar
- Valentin Chernyak as Kulikov
- Zoya Vasilkova as Emelyanova
- Vladimir Protasenko as NKVD officer (uncredited)
- Yevgeny Nikitin as German soldier (uncredited)
  Yevgeny Nikitin
