= Roman Filippov =

Soviet actor (1936–1992)

Roman Filippov PAR
- Born: 24 January 1936; Simferopol, RSFSR, USSR
- Died: 18 February 1992 (aged 56); Moscow, Russia
- Occupation: Actor
- Years active: 1954–1992

Roman Sergeyevich Filippov (Russian: Рома́н Серге́евич Фили́ппов; 24 January 1936 – 18 February 1992) was a Soviet theater and film actor. People's Artist of the RSFSR (1987).

== Selected filmography ==
- World Champion (1954) as fighter
- Green Van (1959) as Fedka Byk
- The Girls (1961) as Vasya Zaitsev
- Street of the Younger Son (1962) as uncle Yasha
- Beloved (1965) as furniture loader
- The City of Masters (1966) as baron
- Three Fat Men (1966) as Prospero
- The Diamond Arm (1968) as Ladyzhensky
- Gentlemen of Fortune (1971) as Nikola
- Drama from Ancient Life (1971) as Prokhor
- Grandads-Robbers (1971) as robber
- Telegram (1971) as episode
- The Twelve Chairs (1971) as poet Nikifor Lyapis-Trubetskoy
- Earthly Love (1974) as Baturin
- Destiny (1977) as Baturin
- Balamut (1978) as Fedor (Fedya) Paramonov
- Siberiade (1979) as Chernokhvostikov
- At the Beginning of Glorious Days (1980) as Fyodor Romodanovsky
- The Youth of Peter the Great (1980) as Fyodor Romodanovsky
- Charodei (1982) as Modest Matveevich Kamneyedov
- Married Bachelor (1982) as Stepan Kuzmich
- Boris Godunov (1986) as Patriarch Job of Moscow
- Peter the Great (1986) as Danila Menshikov
- Entrance to the Labyrinth (1989) as Nikolai Ignatievich Belavol
