= Pugachev (1978 film) =

- Directed by: Alexey Saltykov
- Written by: Eduard Volodarsky
- Produced by: Alexey Saltykov
- Starring: Yevgeny Matveyev; Vija Artmane
- Cinematography: Igor Chernykh
- Music by: Andrei Eshpai
- Production company: Mosfilm
- Distributed by: Mosfilm
- Release date: 1978
- Running time: 147 min.
- Country: Soviet Union
- Language: Russian

Pugachev (Russian: Емельян Пугачёв) is a 1978 historical drama film, directed by Alexey Saltykov and starring Yevgeny Matveyev and Vija Artmane. The film was honored with a special prize at All-Union Film Festival in 1979.

Don Cossack Yemelyan Pugachev says goodbye to his wife and children and goes to run. The elder Filaret blesses him to lead a rebellion under the name of Peter III of Russia. The insurgents dealt with the feudal lords cruelly. Queen Catherine the Great directs troops against the rioters. Traitors betray Yemelyan, and now he is being transported across Russia in an iron cage.

== Plot ==
In 1773, the Don Cossack Yemelyan Pugachev, on the run, finds refuge with Filaret, a renowned Old Believer abbot, and then hides at the Taly settlement with Stepan Obolyaev, its owner. There, he meets several Yaik Cossacks, including Ivan Zarubin, nicknamed "Chika," who decides to recognize Pugachev as Tsar Peter III. Pugachev gathers followers and, claiming to be the miraculously saved Emperor Peter III, leads a Cossack uprising. This rebellion gradually escalates into a full-scale peasant war, spreading across a vast territory.

During the fighting, Pugachev's forces capture many fortresses, with his ranks swelling with Cossacks, serfs, factory peasants, and escaped convicts. The Bashkir cavalry, led by singer Salavat Yulaev and Colonel Kinzei Arslanov, also joins them. Colonel Chernyshyov, sent to relieve the Pugachev siege on Orenburg, suffers a defeat in an ambush. Empress Catherine the Great struggles to raise a substantial army against the rebels, as the regular forces are tied up in the ongoing Russo-Turkish War. Meanwhile, Pugachev learns of the death of discontented chieftain Mitya Lysov, sends Chika as an emissary to Ufa, and marries Ustinya Kuznetsova, a Yaik Cossack woman. Despite the setbacks, Pugachev’s forces manage to capture Kazan after royal troops devastate the rebel army in Berdsk settlement.

In the Battle of Kazan, Lieutenant Colonel Ivan Michelson deals a crushing blow to Pugachev's forces, forcing him to retreat with the remaining rebel army to the right bank of the Volga. Facing doubts among his followers about support from peasants, Pugachev holds a court in a seized estate, sentencing a cruel landowner, and meets an artist who paints his portrait. In disguise, Pugachev approaches an old acquaintance, a Don Cossack officer, hoping to sway Cossacks sent against him, but his efforts fail. In the significant Battle of Solenikova Vataga, the royal troops finally crush the rebels. As a result, a conspiracy forms among Cossack colonels, led by chieftains Fedulev and Tvorogov. Betrayed, Pugachev is captured, though Kinzei Arslanov manages to escape.

In Simbirsk, Yemelyan Pugachev is interrogated by General Pyotr Panin, confined in an iron cage.

== Main cast ==
- Yevgeny Matveyev as Yemelyan Pugachev
- Vija Artmane as Catherine the Great
- Tamara Syomina as Sofia Pugachyeva
- Olga Prokhorova as Ustinya Pugachyeva
- Pyotr Glebov as Stepan Fedulov
- Boris Kudryavtsev as Maksim Shigayev (voiced by Stanislav Chekan)
- Grigore Grigoriu as Chika Zarubin (voiced by Vladimir Ferapontov)
- Viktor Pavlov as Mitka Lysov
- Boris Kulikov as Andrei Ovchinnikov
- Konstantin Zakharchenko as Ivan Tvorogov
- Fyodor Odinokov as Khlopusha
- Mikhail Zlatopolsky as deacon
- Vatslav Dvorzhetsky as Filaret
- Salavat Kireyev as Salawat Yulayev
- Boris Plotnikov as icon painter
- Igor Gorbachyov as Nikita Panin
- Anatoly Azo as Grigory Orlov (voiced by Vladimir Druzhnikov)
- Vilnis Bekeris as Johann von Michelsohnen
- Sergei Golovanov as Petr Panin
- Alexander Zhdanov as Paul I of Russia
- Fyodor Nikitin as valet
