= Mozart and Salieri =

Mozart and Salieri can refer to:

- The historical relationship between two classical composers, Mozart and Salieri
- Mozart and Salieri (play), an 1832 play by Alexander Pushkin
- Mozart and Salieri (opera), an 1897 one-act opera by Nikolai Rimsky-Korsakov, based on Pushkin's play
- Mozart and Salieri (film), a 1962 Soviet television drama film

== See also ==
- Amadeus (play), a 1979 play by Peter Shaffer, inspired by Pushkin's play
- Amadeus (film), a 1984 film by Miloš Forman based on Shaffer's play
