= Privalov's Millions =

- Directed by: Yaropolk Lapshin
- Written by: Igor Bolgarin; Yaropolk Lapshin; Viktor Smirnov
- Starring: Leonid Kulagin; Lyudmila Chursina; Vladislav Strzhelchik; Lyudmila Khityaeva; Andrei Fajt; Lyubov Sokolova; Aleksandr Demyanenko
- Cinematography: Igor Lukshin
- Edited by: Lyudmila Chuzo; Svetlana Tarik
- Music by: Yuri Levitin
- Production company: Sverdlovsk Film Studio
- Release date: 1972
- Running time: 157 minutes
- Country: USSR
- Language: Russian

Privalov's Millions (Russian: Приваловские миллионы, romanized: Privalovskiye milliony) is a 1972 two-part historical film based on the novel by Dmitry Mamin-Sibiryak.

In his native city in the Urals back Sergey Privalov - heir to a colossal state. He is full of ideas rebuilding this life: dreams to modernize plants to build schools and hospitals. But there are other hunters heritage, and because Privalov millions ignite serious passions.

== Plot ==
Sergey Privalov, the heir to a vast fortune and industrial enterprises, loses his parents early in life. His mother, Varvara, the only daughter of a wealthy gold mine owner, marries the impulsive and dissolute Alexander Privalov. Her despair over her husband’s infidelity and constant drunken revelry leads her to an early death. Afterward, Alexander remarries a gypsy woman, Stesha, and has a son, Titus. However, Alexander is later murdered by Stesha and her lover, a drinking companion named Sashka Kholostov. Stesha marries Kholostov, and together, they mismanage and ruin the once-prosperous Privalov and Gulaev enterprises, eventually placing Privalov’s Shatrov plants under trusteeship. Sergey, initially removed from family matters due to his youth, returns to his provincial hometown, Uzlov, after completing his education. He seeks to claim his inheritance and improve the lives of local workers. However, the situation is complex; the once-thriving business is deeply indebted due to Kholostov’s mismanagement and the dubious activities of the trustees.

In Uzlov, Privalov’s childhood friend, Sergey Veryovkin, starts legal proceedings against two of these corrupt trustees, Polovodov and Lyakhovsky. At the same time, Privalov falls in love with Nadezhda Bakhareva, daughter of the honest trustee Bakharev, but she rejects him, being devoted to her exiled engineer husband, Maxim Loskutov. As Privalov becomes entangled in various schemes, Polovodov manipulates him into a relationship with his own wife, Antonina, to distract him from the legal process. When this romance ends, Privalov’s attention turns to Lyakhovsky's daughter, Zosia, who uses her charm to influence him into halting the lawsuit against her father. However, Privalov eventually discovers Zosia’s involvement in a plot against him and severs their relationship. Meanwhile, Loskutov dies of tuberculosis, leaving Nadezhda a widow. As the situation worsens, Polovodov, fearing exposure, flees abroad with Zosia, abandoning his family. Disillusioned by these betrayals and the futility of his attempts to improve others' lives, Privalov renounces his claim to the inheritance. Ultimately, the factory and his family home are bought by Oskar Filippovich, an opportunistic outsider who takes advantage of the chaos and manipulations of all parties involved.

== Cast ==
- Leonid Kulagin as Sergey Privalov
- Lyudmila Chursina as Zosya Lyakhovskaya (Privalova)
- Vladislav Strzhelchik as Alexander Polovodov
- Lyudmila Khityaeva as Antonida Polovodova
- Andrei Fajt as Ignatii L'vovich Lyakhovsky
- Lyubov Sokolova as Maria Bakhareva
- Aleksandr Demyanenko as Viktor Bakharev
- Yevgeniy Yevstigneyev as Ivan Yakovlevich
- Igor Yasulovich as Maxim Loskutov
- Yuri Puzyryov as Nicolas Veryovkin
- Stanislav Chekan as Kuzma Ferapontovich Kanunnikov
- Lyudmila Shagalova as Khionia Alekseyevna Zaplatina
- Anatoly Kubatsky as Belmontov
- Valentina Sharykina as actress Kolpakova
- Grigory Shpigel as Oscar Filippovich
- Galina Kindinova as Nadezhda Vasilevna Bakhareva
- Leonid Nevedomsky as Sashka
- Alexey Pokrovsky (episode)

== Shooting ==
The film was shot in Kungur and its surroundings.
