= Virgin Soil Upturned (1959 film) =

- Russian: Поднятая целина
- Directed by: Aleksandr Ivanov
- Written by: Yuriy Lukin; Fyodor Shakhmagonov; Mikhail Sholokhov
- Produced by: Mark Ryss
- Starring: Yevgeny Matveyev; Pyotr Chernov; Pyotr Glebov; Lyudmila Khityaeva; Leonid Kmit
- Cinematography: Vyacheslav Fastovich
- Edited by: N. Nikolaeva
- Music by: Oleg Karavaychuk; Yuri Levitin
- Production company: Lenfilm
- Release date: 1960
- Running time: 278 min.
- Country: Soviet Union
- Language: Russian

Virgin Soil Upturned (Russian: Поднятая целина, romanized: Podnyataya tselina) is a 1960 Soviet drama film directed by Aleksandr Ivanov. Based on Mikhail Sholokhov's novel with the same title.

== Plot ==
The film takes place in the 1930s. The film tells about the worker Davydov, who is sent to the Cossack farm to help the Don Cossacks transition to collective forms of farming and tries to organize a collective farm there by their own methods, coming into conflict with the leader of the local party.

== Cast ==
- Yevgeny Matveyev as Makar Nagulnov
- Pyotr Chernov as Semyon Davydov
- Fyodor Shmakov as Andrey Razmyotnov
- Vladimir Dorofeyev as Grandpa Shchukar
- Lyudmila Khityaeva as Lushka
- Pyotr Glebov as Aleksandr Polovtsev
- Viktor Chekmaryov as Yakov Ostrovnov
- Iosif Kutyansky as Kondrat Maydannikov
- Leonid Kmit as Grigoriy Bannik
- Oleg Yaroshenko as Timofey Rvanyy
- Andrei Abrikosov as the blacksmith Ippolit Sidorovich Shaly
- Nikolay Kryuchkov as Ustin Mikhailovich Rykalin
- Yevgeni Lebedev as Agafon Dubtsov
- Oleg Basilashvili as Cossack
- Gennadi Nilov as episode
- Nikolai Kryukov as Tit Borodin
