= Vladimir Samoilov =

Vladimir Samoilov or Samoylov (Russian: Владимир Самойлов) may refer to:

- Vladimir Samoilov (actor) (1924–1999), Soviet and Russian film and theater actor
- Vladimir Samoilov (figure skater) (born 1999), Russian figure skater
