= Vadim Spiridonov =

- Spiridonov in 1982
- Born: Vadim Semyonovich Spiridonov; 14 October 1944; Moscow, RSFSR, USSR
- Died: 7 December 1989 (aged 45); Moscow, USSR
- Occupations: Stage and film actor
- Years active: 1969–1989
- Spouse: Valentina Sergeevna Spiridonova (born 1942)
- Awards: Honored Artist of the RSFSR (1984)

Vadim Semyonovich Spiridonov (Russian: Вадим Семёнович Спиридонов; 14 October 1944 – 7 December 1989) was a Soviet film actor, film director. Honored Artist of the RSFSR (1984). Winner of the State Prize of the USSR (1979), Winner of the Lenin Komsomol Prize (1980).

== Biography ==
Vadim Spiridonov was born on 14 October 1944 in Moscow. While still a student at the school, Vadim came to the drama club at the factory house of culture. In 1966, Vadim Spiridonov was determined to become an actor and passed the exams in all the major universities of the capital - Shchukin School, Moscow Art Theatre School, the university and went everywhere on competition. Chose to study VGIK, workshop Sergei Gerasimov and Tamara Makarova.

Vadim Spiridonov was a dramatic actor, a major talent and had a powerful temperament. Spiridonov bitterly recalled that he was after the movie, Destiny, won universal hatred among generations of soldiers and workers in the rear and at the youth, told how he was repeatedly recognized on the streets and tried to beat, so hated was a traitor Makashin. However, this image has become a kind of prologue to the main role − Fyodor Saveliev in the long Soviet TV series Eternal Call (19 episodes). Among his roles include (captain Ivan Flyorov − Taming of the Fire, Colonel Deev − Hot Snow, Captain Volokh − Living till Dawn, Captain Orekhov − People in the Ocean, commander Semyon Budyonny − First Cavalry and Not Subject to the Catechumens, Colonel Vladimir Iverzev − The Battalions are asked to Fire).

Actor also worked as a voice actor, dubbing more the fifty Soviet and foreign films − Alain Delon, Gerard Depardieu, Jack Nicholson, Michel Piccoli, Patrick Macnee, Martin Landau, Sergiu Nicolaescu, Amitabh Bachchan.

In the mid-1980s, Vadim Spiridonov made his debut as a film director. The studio Mosfilm, he directed a short film on the script Eduard Volodarsky called Two people. In December 1989 and Spiridonov planned to start filming his second movie, but unfortunately these plans were not destined to be fulfilled.

Vadim Spiridonov predicted his early death. Shortly before his death, in a conversation with his wife Valentina it whether in jest, or not, said: Die, would soon from this life. And not to go out, it is better to die in the winter, for example, on 7 January. Wife retorted: People have a holiday, and you're going to die. He thought a moment and said, Well, then on 7 December will make you a present (my wife's birthday on 8 December). In life, everything happened exactly in those words. On that fateful evening, 7 December 1989, and Spiridonov had to go to Minsk, where in the next few days started shooting a new film based on the novel of Vasily Belov All ahead , where he was to play a major role. It seemed that there were no signs of trouble: the actor was cheerful, happy. For a couple of hours before leaving the house, he decided to take a nap, punishing Valentin that she woke him up at the right time. But two hours later when his wife touched the husband, he was no longer breathing. The actor fell asleep forever. As it turned out, Vadim Spiridonov died in his sleep from a bout of acute heart failure immediately. He was buried on 10 December 1989 in Moscow at the Vagankovo Cemetery (station number 13).

== Selected filmography ==
- By the Lake as Konstantin Konovalov (1969)
- Hot Snow as Colonel Deev (1972)
- Happy Go Lucky as Vasily Chulkov (1972)
- Taming of the Fire as Ivan Flyorov (1972)
- Eternal Call as Fyodor Saveliev (1973 / 83)
- Earthly Love as Fyodor Makashin (1975)
- Destiny as Fyodor Makashin (1977)
- The Youth of Peter the Great as Fyodor Shaklovity (1980)
- Hit Back as captain Yevgeny Shvets (1981)
- Station for Two as Misha (1982)
- The Criminal Quartet (1989) as Lobanov

== Recognition and awards ==
- USSR State Prize for the role of Fedor Saveliev in the film Eternal Call (1979)
- Lenin Komsomol Prize for the role of the Roman Bastrykov in the film Father and Son (1980)
- Honored Artist of the RSFSR (1984)
