= Vladimir Samoilov (actor) =

Soviet and Russian film and theater actor

Vladimir Samoilov PAU
- Владимир Самойлов
- Samoilov in 1963
- Born: Vladimir Yakovlevich Samoilov; 15 March 1924; Odesa, Ukrainian SSR, Soviet Union
- Died: 8 September 1999 (aged 75); Moscow, Russia
- Education: Odesa Theatre and Art School
- Occupation: Actor
- Years active: 1948–1999
- Spouse: Nadezhda Samoilova
- Children: 1

Vladimir Yakovlevich Samoilov (Russian: Влади́мир Я́ковлевич Само́йлов; 1924–1999) was a Soviet and Russian film and theater actor. People's Artist of the USSR (1984). Winner of the Stanislavsky State Prize (1972), and two USSR State Prizes (1976, 1986).

== Selected filmography ==
- 1959 — Unrequited Duty as Zhgutov
- 1960 — A Man with a Future as Professor Preobrazhensky
- 1964 — Believe Me, People as Anokhin
- 1967 — Wedding in Malinovka as Nazar Duma, Red squadron commander
- 1968 — Liberation as Divisional Commander Gromov
- 1971 — Shadows disappear at noon as Arkady Arsentevich Klychkov, manufacturer and gold mines
- 1972 — Investigation Held by ZnaToKi: Dinosaur as Sergei Mikheyev, a counterfeiter
- 1973 — Stepmom as Viktor Vikentievich
- 1974 — Earthly Love as Anisimov
- 1974 — Sokolovo as Lieutenant general
- 1975 — Bonus as Batarcev
- 1976 — The Days of the Turbins as Hetman Skoropadsky
- 1977 — Destiny as Anisimov
- 1977 — Soldiers of Freedom as Sergey Biryuzov
- 1979 — Siberiade as Afanasy Ustyuzhanin
- 1982 — Niccolo Paganini as Borghese
- 1987 — Visit to Minotaur as Vladimir Uvarov
- 1990 — Sons of Bitches as Pyotr Yegorovich, Theater's Director
- 1992 — Price of the Head as Jules Maigret
- 2000 — Repete as Alexey Zykov
