= Mikhail Zlatopolsky =

Russian bass vocalist (1934–2001)

Mikhail Mikhailovich Zlatopolsky (Russian: Михаил Михайлович Златопольский, born Motya Moiseyevich Zlotopolsky, Мотя Моисеевич Злотопольский; 15 August 1934 – 7 March 2001) was a Soviet Russian vocalist and occasional actor. Zlatopolsky was listed as the lowest bass in the world with a documented low note of C1.

== Biography ==
Zlatopolsky was born to a Jewish family in Tashkent. Finished music school in Samarkand. After the Russian Revolution, when Orthodox singing moved into the category of marginal employment, the number of basso profondos sharply declined. Soviet oktavists enjoyed intense demand during the Brezhnev era. Moscow choirs outbid each other for Zlatopolsky as the star player. Zlatopolsky's place was employed by the Union Radio Choir, but he also performed with a number of Orthodox, Catholic and Lutheran churches, and at times a synagogue. Zlatopolsky began singing with Yurlov's choir, and later participated in Valery Polyansky's recording of Gretchaninov's Seven Days of Passion with the State Symphony Capella of Russia. Zlatopolsky recorded with the Don Cossacks Choir Russia under Marcel Verhoeff. He also can be heard singing Sviridov's Songs of Kursk with the Moscow State Chamber Choir under Vladimir Minin.

Besides his musical career, Zlatopolsky also worked as an actor on several Russian films and TV shows, often playing the part of a Russian Orthodox priest. Although these parts were mostly small, his most prominent roles were in Pugachev (1978), Three Years (1980), We are Not Crowned in the Church (1982), and Storm over Russia (1992).

== Vocal range ==
Even in the world of oktavists, Zlatopolsky's range is exceptional for its depth. Chesnokov differentiates between a basso profondo whose range extends a little below C_{2}, and strong oktavists, whose range may extend as low as G_{1} or F_{1}. Zlatopolsky can be heard singing down to C_{1} in the Don Cossack's Choir performance of "Prayer for the Dead". He was the only person in recorded history who had the ability to sing this note over a choir without amplification. The Guinness Book of World Records listed Zlatopolsky as the lowest bass in the world with a documented low note of E♭_{1}. Zlatopolsky's upper register is featured prominently in Pugachev (1978).

Zlatopolsky was not only known for the sheer depth of his range, but also his resonance and power. One Moscow chorister describes the experience of singing with Zlatopolsky thus: "At one concert on a small stage, we stood in close alignment. I was next to Mikhail. We were performing Kedrov's Our Father, and Zlatopolsky went into the contra octave. His voice began to shake the bodies of us who were standing near him. I was not up to singing—stood there in a kind of trance, trying to comprehend the experience." Another remembers seeing Zlatopolsky perform a choral cycle by Gavrilin. He noted that generally oktavists, along with the rest of the choir, need to be precisely on pitch in order for such notes in the contra-octave to be clearly audible—otherwise the sonority is ruined. During the performance, however, he recounts that the rest of the choir sounded like "nothing more than a squeak" above the sound of Zlatopolsky's voice. Despite his enormous voice, Zlatopolsky was relatively small in terms of height, standing at five feet, seven inches tall.

== See also ==
- Basso profondo
- Russian Orthodox chant
