= And Quiet Flows the Don (1958 film) =

1958 film

- The poster in English
- Directed by: Sergei Gerasimov
- Written by: Sergei Gerasimov; Mikhail Sholokhov (novel)
- Starring: Pyotr Glebov; Elina Bystritskaya; Zinaida Kiriyenko, Lyudmila Khityaeva
- Cinematography: Vladimir Rapoport
- Edited by: Nina Vasilyeva
- Music by: Yuri Levitin
- Production company: Gorky Film Studio
- Release dates: 26 October 1957; (Parts 1/2); 30 April 1958 (Part 3)
- Running time: 330 minutes
- Country: Soviet Union
- Language: Russian

And Quiet Flows the Don (Russian: Тихий Дон, translit. Tikhiy Don) is a three-part Soviet epic film directed by Sergei Gerasimov based on the novel of the same title by Mikhail Sholokhov. The first two parts of the film were released in October 1957 and the final third part in 1958. The film tells the story of Russia's involvement in the World War I, the October Revolution, the Russian Civil War, the fate of ordinary people, the crumbling ideals of the Don Cossacks and the personal tragedy of the protagonist, Grigori Melekhov (anglicised Gregory Melehoff). The protagonist is described by Gerasimov as in fact "a man without a road, doomed by history."

== Plot ==
=== Part One ===
The young Cossack Grigori Melekhov is in love with a married Cossack woman called Aksinya Astakhova and she reciprocates, but those around him are against it, viewing it as a shameful union. The situation is aggravated after the return of Aksinya's husband from military training, and the husband beats his wife. Grigori is wed to another woman, Natalia Korshunova. Grigori and Aksinya decide to run away from their families, but their new life is cut short by the start of the First World War. Aksinya tells Grigori she is pregnant, though Grigori doubts his paternity.

Grigori is conscripted into the Imperial Army and his unit battles with the Austro-Hungarians. For his actions, he is wounded but receives the St. George's Cross for bravery. Aksinya loses her child and is comforted by an estate owner's son. Returning on hospital leave, Grigori finds out that Aksinya was unfaithful to him. In a fit of jealousy, he beats the man and Aksinya with a whip, after which he returns to his father and wife Natalia.

=== Part Two ===
A few years later in 1916, Russian officers in a dugout are playing cards and discussing the war under the distant roar of cannonade. Their soldiers are reading an anti-war leaflet. During the next attack, the Germans use poison gas. In the midst of the chaotic retreat, Grigori stumbles upon and saves Aksinya's husband. Back home, at a meeting of the villagers, they announce the deposition of Emperor Nicholas II and the transfer of power to the Provisional Committee of the State Duma.

Discord arises among the Cossacks. Yesaul Kalmykov advocates joining General Kornilov's forces and restore order in Russia, while the cornet Bunchuk wants to defend the Revolution. Kalmykov is disarmed, and Bunchuk kills the yesaul, his superior officer. Grigori finds himself in a full room with portraits of Karl Marx and red banners, where the fight with General Kaledin, a leader in the White Army, is discussed. However, the Cossacks argue about whether they should support the Bolsheviks or whether they can cope on their own. Melekhov witness two groups of Cossacks fight, Podtyolkov's 'Red' Cossacks and Chernetsov's 'White' Cossacks; the Whites lose, and Podtyolkov cuts down the captive Chernetsov with his sword.

Grigori returns to his father and distributes gifts, but even here the Cossacks have no unity. Grigori is leaning toward the idea of 'Soviet power,' but his father wants nothing to do with it. The power is changing, and Grigori Melekhov, with shoulder straps and royal medals, observes the execution of Red Cossacks, recalling in his mind Podtyolkov's massacre of Chernetsov's Cossacks. The Bolshevik Shtokman demands the arrest of Grigori, but Grigori manages to escape. The Reds capture and shoot Peter, Gregory's brother.

Grigori, at the head of a hundred Cossacks, cuts down revolutionary sailors in an attack. However, his mind remains cloudy from the war at the front and the ensuing war at home.

=== Part Three ===
Part Three opens up with Grigori on the Tatarsky farm against the background of flowering trees, hearing the cries of his wife Natalia. At a watering hole by the river, he meets Aksinya with buckets and admits out-loud that he cannot throw her out of his heart.

Daria, the widow of Peter, Grigori's brother, kills a captive fellow villager from the Reds who had participated in the murder of her husband. Subsequently, for this act of retaliation, she receives encouragement from the command of the White Guards in the presence of a British officer.

Natalia Melekhova, who had become pregnant with Grigori's child, tries to abort her pregnancy, saying that she "doesn't want to give birth to Grigori anymore." She dies as a result and the child is born anyway, and is named Mikhail (Mishatka as the diminutive). Meanwhile, at the headquarters of the White Don Army in Balashov, Grigori remains unaware of his son's birth and drinks cognac with other officers. When the Whites retreat, Grigori takes Aksinya with him, but when she gets sick in the winter, he is forced to leave her in the care of a peasant family.

In the spring of 1920, Grigori arrives in Novorossiysk, where the evacuation of the Whites takes place on a steamer. Life on the Tatarsky farm goes on, but tensions remain among the Cossacks with Grigori's mother unable to forgive the neighbors who killed her son. A Red Cossack responds, saying that "all the murderers are in the war," including her other son Grigori. A wounded (with an amputated right hand) Cossack Proshka arrives at the farm, telling Aksinya that Grigori in Novorossiysk has joined the First Cavalry Army of General Semyon Budyonny and is in command of a cavalry regiment. Grigori Melekhov arrives. He is warned that the Reds have come to arrest Grigori, and so he runs away from the farm. Having stumbled upon some anti-Soviet rebels, Grigori chooses to leave them as well. He tries to leave with Aksinya to the Kuban, but a bullet fired from a horse patrol kills her. He buries her under a great tree. Throwing his weapons into the river, Grigori returns to his native farm and hugs his son from Natalia, Mishatka, who is now a few years old.

== Cast ==
- Pyotr Glebov as Grigori Melekhov
- Elina Bystritskaya as Aksiniya
- Zinaida Kiriyenko as Natalia
- Lyudmila Khityaeva as Daria Melekhova
- Daniil Ilchenko as Pantelei Melekhov
- Boris Novikov as Mitka Korshunov
- Igor Dmitriev as Eugene Listnitsky
- Vadim Zakharchenko as Prokhor Zykov
- Mikhail Gluzsky as Esaul Kalmykov

== Reception ==
In 1958, the film won Crystal Globe award at the Karlovy Vary International Film Festival and the Best Picture Award at the All-Union Film Festival.

== See also ==
- List of longest films
