= Soldiers of Freedom =

1977 film by Yuri Ozerov

- Original Bulgarian film poster
- Directed by: Yuri Ozerov
- Written by: Oscar Kurganov
- Starring: Mikhail Ulyanov; Yevgeny Matveyev; Vasily Lanovoy
- Cinematography: Igor Slabnevich
- Music by: Yuri Levitin
- Production company: Mosfilm
- Release date: 1977
- Running time: 599 minutes
- Country: Soviet Union
- Language: Russian

Soldiers of Freedom (Russian: Солдаты свободы, romanized: Soldaty svobody) is a four-part 1977 film epic directed by Yuri Ozerov and starring Mikhail Ulyanov, Yevgeny Matveyev, Vasily Lanovoy. It is a World War II historical drama and the sequel to 1970-71's Liberation.

== Plot ==
The film reflects the following events of World War II: the capitulation of Friedrich Paulus's Sixth Army as a result of the failed assault on Stalingrad during Operation Blue in 1942; the preparation for revolt in Slovakia; negotiations of the Polish communists with Władysław Sikorski's government over their joint struggle against fascism; the creation of a National Committee of the Domestic Front in Bulgaria and preparation by underground workers-communists for armed revolt; expansion of the guerrilla (partisan) movement; the failure of a German attempt to destroy People's Liberation Army of Josip Broz Tito; one of the largest military operations, Bagration; the beginning of the liberation of Poland; creation of the Polish National Government in Lublin; the Warsaw Uprising; the capitulation of Bór-Komorowski and defeat of the Polish patriots; the entry of Soviet and Polish armies into Warsaw.

== Cast ==
- Mikhail Ulyanov as Marshal Zhukov
- Mircea Șeptilici as judge
- Yevgeny Matveyev as Leonid Brezhnev
- Vasily Lanovoy as Andrei Grechko
- Stefan Getsov as Georgi Dimitrov
- Viktor Avdyushko as Marshal Ivan Konev
- Bohus Pastorek as Klement Gottwald
- Horst Preusker as Wilhelm Pieck
- Yakov Tripolsky as Joseph Stalin
- Lubomir Kabakchiyev as Palmiro Togliatti
- Boris Belov as Maurice Thorez
- Peter Stefanou as Todor Zhivkov
- Vladlen Davydov as Marshal Konstantin Rokossovsky
- Károly Ujlaky as János Kádár
- Miklós Benedek as Gen. Ludvík Svoboda
- Anton Gorchev as Dobri Dzhurov
- Violeta Bahchevanova as Roza Dimitrova
- Valentin Kazancki as Winston Churchill
- Stanisław Jaśkiewicz as Franklin D. Roosevelt
- Naum Shopov as Tzar Boris III
- Fritz Diez as Adolf Hitler
- Gerd Michael Henneberg as Wilhelm Keitel
- Horst Gill as Otto Günsche
- Pavel Popandov as Tzano Velchev
- Valentin Gadzhokov as Atanas Hadzhiyanchev
- Zlatko Pavlov as Zdravko
- Nikolai Ouzounov as Tzvyatko
- Zbigniew Józefowicz as Piotr Jaroszewicz
- Edward Linde-Lubaszenko as Edward Gierek
- Jerzy Turek
- Constantin Fugașin as Nicolae Ceaușescu
