= Particularly Important Task =

- Russian: Особо важное задание
- Directed by: Yevgeny Matveev
- Written by: Boris Dobrodeev; BPyotr Popogrebskiy
- Starring: Evgeniy Matveev; Valeriya Zaklunnaya; Lyudmila Gurchenko; Nikolay Kryuchkov; Vladimir Samoylov
- Cinematography: Igor Chernykh
- Music by: Evgeniy Ptichkin
- Release date: 1980
- Running time: 138 minute
- Country: Soviet Union
- Language: Russian

Particularly Important Task (Russian: Особо важное задание) is a 1980 Soviet drama film directed by Yevgeny Matveev.

The film tells about the employees of a large aircraft factory, who continued to manufacture aircraft following their evacuation to a new site during the Second World War.

== Plot ==
In 1940, Aviation Factory No. 18 in Voronezh is tasked with rapidly producing the Ilyushin Il-2 attack aircraft. After completing the first plane, Chief Engineer Kirillov departs for Crimea with his wife, leaving their young son in a village with his grandmother. When World War II breaks out, Kirillov rushes back, only to find that the factory, which never ceased production, has been ordered to evacuate its staff and equipment beyond the Volga. As Director Shadurov moves to set up the new factory site, Kirillov and his colleague Lunina oversee the evacuation. When Lunina is killed by enemy forces, Kirillov is falsely detained but is eventually freed by Shadurov, returning to the plant where dedicated workers, including women and children, labor tirelessly to resume production in the barren steppes.

Despite enormous challenges, the factory ramps up production to meet Stalin’s urgent demands, increasing the plant's daily output from one aircraft to three planes built a day. After Shadurov dies at his post, Kirillov takes his place as director. During the handover of the aircraft to pilots, Kirillov’s wife Masha decides to join the fight as an air gunner, leaving with pilot Gureyev to the front, where they both ultimately perish in combat. Kirillov, burdened by loss but determined, oversees the factory's continued success, contributing to the Soviet victory. In a final, bittersweet moment, he is honored in Moscow and later finds his son in the village, symbolizing hope amid wartime sacrifice.

== Cast ==
- Evgeniy Matveev
- Valeriya Zaklunnaya
- Lyudmila Gurchenko
- Nikolay Kryuchkov
- Vladimir Samoylov
- Pyotr Chernov
- Gennadiy Yukhtin
- Yevgeny Kindinov
- Yevgeni Lazarev
- Lev Borisov
