= Vija Artmane =

Latvian actress (1929–2008)

- Born: Alīda Artmane; 21 August 1929; Kaive, Sēme Parish, Latvia
- Died: 11 October 2008 (aged 79); Strenči, Latvia
- Occupation: Actress
- Years active: 1950–2003
- Spouse: Artūrs Dimiters
- Children: Kaspars Dimiters (1957), Kristiāna Dimitere (1965)

Vija Artmane (born Alīda Artmane; 21 August 1929 – 11 October 2008) was a Latvian theatre and cinema actress.

== Life and career ==
=== Childhood ===
Vija Artmane was born as Alīda Artmane at the time when Latvia was a sovereign nation. Her father, Fricis Arnolds Artmanis, of partial Baltic German ancestry, died in an accident at the age of 19, just four months before she was born. Her mother Anna Regīna Zaborska, of Polish heritage, survived as a single mother by doing seasonal agricultural jobs. As a young girl, Artmane grew up playing in the fields; she was fond of wildflowers and learned to make flower arrangements and dolls in the Latvian traditional style. While her mother worked for a landlord, her master sent young Artmane to study music and dance at a ballet class for a couple of years. However, at the age of 10, young Artmane became a shepherd girl. She worked with a herd of cows for over five years, and survived until the end of the Second World War. In 1946, she graduated from secondary school and had a dream of becoming a lawyer in order to make the world a better place. At the same time, she was involved in amateur acting at her school, and became interested in film and theatre. Eventually, her passion for acting prevailed.

=== Acting career ===
After the war in 1946, Artmane moved to Riga, and began her studies at the Daile Theatre Second Studio, eventually staying there as a member of the troupe for the next 50 years. At the very beginning of her acting career, she changed her first name to Vija, upon a hint from her teacher and for artistic reasons. From 1946 to 1949, Artmane studied acting under the tutelage of the Latvian theatre director Eduards Smiļģis, the original founder of the troupe. From 1949 to 1998, Artmane was the leading star of the troupe at the Daile Theatre in Riga. She played her best stage roles under the directorship of Smiļģis. Her most memorable stage works were classic roles as Juliet in Romeo and Juliet (1953), and Ophelia in Hamlet, among other Shakespeare plays. Artmane also created important roles in Latvian plays such as Indulis and Ārija and Fire and Night under the direction of the National Actor of Latvia Rainis. She was critically acclaimed for her stage works in Russian plays, such as her passionate performance as Tolstoy's heroine Anna Karenina; she also played in Tolstoy's War and Peace, in Gogol's Dead Souls, and other classic Russian plays. After the death of Smiļģis, in 1966, Artmane gradually switched to contemporary plays, but she also continued to perform some of her classic stage roles during the 1970s and 1980s.

From 1998 to 2000, she worked with the New Riga Theatre. There she appeared in the title role in a stage production of The Queen of Spades based on the eponymous short story by Alexander Pushkin.

=== Recognition ===
In 1956, Artmane was already a recognised star of the Latvian stage, when she made her film debut in Posle shtorma (After the Storm). In 1963, she shot to fame in the Soviet Union with her leading role as Sonya, a beautiful and loving mother, opposite Evgeni Matveev in the popular film Blood Ties (1964). After that film, Artmane was nicknamed "Mother-Latvia" in her homeland. She enjoyed a steady film career in the Soviet Union during the 1960s, 1970s, and 1980s. Her film career was highlighted with such roles as Veda Kong in the popular science fiction film Tumannost' Andromedy (1967), as Empress Catherine the Great in the historical drama Yemelyan Pugachyov (1978), as Julia Lamber in the film Teātris (1978), and other notable film works. Vija Artmane appeared as herself in a documentary on her life entitled Conversation with the Queen (1980) which was produced at the Riga Film Studio.

=== Legacy ===
Vija Artmane is regarded as one of the leading figures of Latvian culture. During the period of Soviet control, Artmane took an active part in the movement for preservation and support of Latvian national heritage; she has been an active proponent for the use of the Latvian language in literature and art, as well as in everyday life. She was named "People's Artist of the Latvian SSR" in 1965 and recognised as a People's Artist of the USSR in 1969. The same year she was a member of the jury at the 6th Moscow International Film Festival.

In 1999 Artmane was given an award by the Latvian Ministry of Culture for her contribution to the art of theatre and cinema. In 2003 she received the special Theatre Prize for her long-standing contribution to Latvian culture. In 2007 Vija Artmane was decorated with the Order of the Three Stars, which is conferred in recognition of outstanding civil merit in the service of Latvia.

The asteroid 4136 Artmane discovered on 1968 March was named in her honour.

=== Personal life and death ===
Vija Artmane was married to Latvian actor Artūrs Dimiters, and the couple had two children – musician Kaspars Dimiters (1957) and artist Kristiāna Dimitere (1965). In 1986, after the death of her husband, she suffered from an emotional breakdown and later had a stroke.

In the 1990s by the Latvian property restitution laws, her apartment in Riga was transferred to the heirs of its previous owners, and Artmane moved out of the city due to money shortage and settled in her dacha in the countryside.

In the early 2000s, she converted to Eastern Orthodoxy.

In 2004, she published a book of memoirs covering her acting career as well as her personal life.

She dies on 11 October 2008 at age 79, and was interred at Pokrov Cemetery in Riga.

== Filmography ==
- 1958 — Alien in the Village — Elsa
- 1962 — A Day Without an Evening — Kaire
- 1963 — Native Blood — Sonya
- 1963 — Introduction to Life — Neighbor
- 1964 — Rockets Shouldn't Take Off — Pearl
- 1966 — Edgar and Kristina — Kristina
- 1967 — Farhad's Feat — Vera
- 1967 — Nobody Wanted to Die — Ona
- 1967 — Strong with Spirit — Lydia Lisovskaya
- 1967 — The Andromeda Nebula — Veda Kong
- 1968 — Surveyor Times — Lien
- 1969 — Triple Check — Frau Greta
- 1969 — Rays in Glass — Iris
- 1970 — The Ballad of Bering and His Friends — Anna Bering
- 1972 — Spruce in the Rye — Dagmar
- 1973 — Gift to a Lonely Woman — Knepikha-Gita
- 1975 — The Arrows of Robin Hood — Kat
- 1976 — Master — Aina Petrovna
- 1977 — Exchange — Jadwiga Ziliuwiene
- 1978 — Pugachev — Catherine II
- 1978 — Theatre — Julia Lambert
- 1978 — Your Son — Mother
- 1980 — State Border — Zinaida Kirillovna
- 1981 — Investigation Established — Ruta Yanovna Graudina
- 1981 — The Larks — Gundega
- 1986 — The Secret of the Snow Queen — Mrs. Autumn
- 1987 — Man of the Retinue — Aglaya Andreevna
- 1987 — Moonzund — Frau Milykh
- 1990 — Hearse — Evgenia Andreevna
- 1990 — Only for Crazy — Zina
- 1991 — Love — Marina's grandmother
- 1999 — Kamenskaya — Regina Arkadievna Walter
- 2003 — Golden Age — Catherine II

== Awards and honours ==
- Honoured Artist of the Latvian SSR (1956)
- People's Artist of the Latvian SSR (1965)
- People's Artist of the USSR (1969)
- Order of Lenin (1979)
- Order of Friendship (Russia, 2004)
- Order of the Three Stars (22 October 2007)
- Winner of the All-Union Film Festival (1964, 1968).
- Laureate of State Prize of the Latvian SSR (1980)
- Prize named Lilita Berzina (1987)
- Prize named Bertha Rumnietse (1996)
- Prize II All-Russian Festival "New Russian Cinema" (2001)
- Top award for lifelong contribution to Latvian arts (2003)

== Sources ==
- Biography of Vija Artmane by: Steve Shelokhonov
- Artmane Vija, "Ziemcieši. Mirkļi no manas dzīves", Pētergailis, 2004. Dokumentary prose, memoirs.
- Eduards Smiļģis Theatre Museum, Pārdaugava, Riga, Latvia.

== Bibliography ==
- Артмане, Вия (1990), Сердце на ладони (in Russian), Moscow, Ru: Молодая гвардия, ISBN 5-235-00633-X
- Сосновский, Иммануил (1985), Вия Артмане (in Russian), Moscow, Ru: Союз кинематографистов СССР
