= Russian Field =

- Directed by: Nikolai Moskalenko
- Written by: Mikhail Alekseyev
- Starring: Nonna Mordyukova; Vladimir Tikhonov; Leonid Markov; Lyudmila Khityaeva; Inna Makarova
- Cinematography: Yuri Gantman
- Music by: Aleksandr Flyarkovsky
- Production company: Mosfilm
- Release date: 1972
- Running time: 90 min
- Country: Soviet Union
- Language: Russian

Russian Field (Russian: Русское поле, romanized: Russkoye pole) is a 1972 Soviet romantic drama film directed by Nikolai Moskalenko. It took the 22nd place in terms of attendance among domestic films in the Soviet Union.

Fedosia Ugryumova (Nonna Mordyukova) for many is a model of a loving wife, mother, worker. But the son of Philip (Vladimir Tikhonov) has grown, the husband Avdyei (Leonid Markov) leaves her for young Nadya (Lyudmila Khityaeva) and Fedosia's world starts to collapse.

== Plot ==
The film is set in a rural Soviet Russian village around the time of its creation.

Fedosya Ugryumova, a tractor brigade leader, faces a difficult situation when her husband, Avdey Petrovich, leaves her to marry another woman. Their 18-year-old son, Philip, deeply hurt by his father's actions, even attempts to crush the newlyweds’ car with a tractor on the day of their wedding. Shortly after the marriage, Avdey starts feeling nostalgic for Fedosya, whose straightforward and honest nature contrasts with his new wife Nadya, who is primarily interested in acquiring a car.

Philip is soon drafted into the army and is stationed on the Far Eastern border. Meanwhile, Fedosya’s friend, Maria Solovyova, returns to the village after a failed life in the city with no children. When Fedosya and her friends visit the agricultural equipment depot to secure new tractors, they meet Pavel Fedchenkov, who was once Maria's boyfriend in her youth. Pavel later comes to the village to propose to Maria, but she learns that he has four children who lost their mother.

Over a year passes since Philip’s enlistment. Avdey tries to return to Fedosya, but she cannot forgive him. At the border where Philip is stationed, a conflict breaks out involving an armed breach (implied to be the Soviet-Chinese border conflict over Damansky Island, though it is not explicitly mentioned in the film), and during the skirmish, Philip is killed by gunfire from the other side.

In the film's final scene, Fedosya and her friends are working in the fields on tractors when a group of foreign correspondents arrives. One reporter asks Fedosya how many children she has, to which she replies, "Many. Everyone you meet is mine."

== Cast ==
- Nonna Mordyukova as Fedosia Ugryumova
- Vladimir Tikhonov as Philipp Ugriumov, Fedosya's and Avdei's son
- Leonid Markov as Avdei Ugriumov
- Inna Makarova as Maria Solovyova
- Lyubov Malinovskaya as Antonina
- Lyudmila Khityaeva as Nadya, Avdei's second wife
- Zoya Fyodorova as Matrona
- Nina Maslova as Nina, daughter Antonina
- Vyacheslav Nevinny as Pavel Fomich Fedchenkov
- Lyudmila Gladunko as Tanya, Philipp's bride

== Awards ==
In 1972, Nonna Mordyukova was recognized as the best actress as voted by the magazine Soviet Screen.
