= The Variegateds Case =

- Russian: Дело 'пестрых'
- Directed by: Nikolai Dostal
- Written by: Arkadi Adamov; Anatoli Granberg
- Starring: Andrei Abrikosov; Vladimir Kenigson; Aleksandra Kazakova; Vsevolod Safonov; Aleksey Gribov
- Cinematography: Igor Slabnevich
- Music by: Mikhail Chulaki
- Release date: 1958
- Running time: 102 minute
- Country: Soviet Union
- Language: Russian

The Variegateds Case (Russian: Дело 'пестрых') is a 1958 Soviet crime action film directed by Nikolai Dostal.

== Plot ==
The film is set at the end of the 1950s. After the war and service in post-war Germany, young Lieutenant of Soviet intelligence Sergei Korshunov returns to Moscow. On the recommendation of the district party committee, the former intelligence officer, contrary to the wishes of his beloved girlfriend Lena, becomes an employee of the Moscow criminal investigation department. They quarrel and break up.

Sergei's service does not begin too well. His first case is connected with the investigation of the robbery of an apartment and the murder of a citizen Amosova. Due to his inexperience, Korshunov is fond of the version associated with the cousin of the murdered Valentina. Korshunov, confident of her guilt, exceeds his official powers during interrogation, raises his voice to the suspect and receives a penalty from the police commissioner. Nevertheless, he is given a second chance. Sergey's colleague investigator Lobanov helps a young employee to master the subtleties of detective work.

Colonel Zotov's group is gradually coming to the gang, which is led by an experienced recidivist nicknamed "Daddy". Criminals find themselves associated with a group of young people without certain occupations, having fun in restaurants and dance floors. For an easy life, they have to sell stolen goods. Lena gets to one of their meetings, but immediately decides to break up with dubious acquaintances. Law enforcement officers manage to persuade several members of the group to cooperate. The investigation finds out the address of Kuptsevich, the buyer of stolen goods. Sergei receives a dangerous task to organize an ambush on his Father at Kuptsevich's apartment. From the first time it is not possible to take it. During the detention, Sergei is almost killed. However, on the second attempt, the Father is detained. A modest seller of the bird market not only organized several robberies, but also helped a foreign spy to legalize in the USSR.

In the final, Sergey and Lena are together again.

== Cast ==
- Andrei Abrikosov
- Vladimir Kenigson
- Aleksandra Kazakova
- Vsevolod Safonov
- Aleksey Gribov
- Evgeniy Matveev
- Natalya Fateeva
- Lev Polyakov
- Tamara Loginova
- Oleg Tabakov
- Mikhail Pugovkin
