= The Diamond Arm =

- Film poster
- Directed by: Leonid Gaidai
- Written by: Moris Slobodskoy; Yakov Kostyukovsky; Leonid Gaidai
- Starring: Yuri Nikulin; Nina Grebeshkova; Nonna Mordyukova; Stanislav Chekan; Vladimir Gulyaev; Andrei Mironov; Anatoli Papanov; Svetlana Svetlichnaya
- Cinematography: Igor Chernykh
- Edited by: Valentina Yankovskaya
- Music by: Aleksandr Zatsepin
- Distributed by: Mosfilm
- Release date: 28 April 1969
- Running time: 100 minutes
- Country: Soviet Union
- Language: Russian

The Diamond Arm (Russian: Бриллиантовая рука Brilliantovaya ruka) is a Soviet crime comedy film made by Mosfilm and first released in 1969. The film was directed by Leonid Gaidai and starred several famous Soviet actors, including Yuri Nikulin, Andrei Mironov, Anatoli Papanov, Nonna Mordyukova and Svetlana Svetlichnaya. The Diamond Arm has become a Russian cult film and is considered by many Russian contemporaries to be one of the finest comedies of all time. It was also one of the all-time leaders at the Soviet box office with over 76,700,000 cinema admissions in the Soviet era. The plot of the film was based on a real-life news item about Swiss smugglers who tried to transport jewels in an orthopedic cast.

== Plot ==
The boss of a black market ring (known only as "The Chief") wants to smuggle a batch of jewelry from a foreign state into the Soviet Union by hiding it inside the orthopedic cast of a courier. The Chief sends a minor henchman named Gennadiy 'Gesha' Kozodoyev (played by Mironov) to serve as the courier. Kozodoyev travels to Turkey via a tourist cruise ship. The local co-conspirators do not know what the courier looks like; they only know that he is supposed to say a code word to identify himself. The code word is a simple swear such as "Oh darn", after a slip and "fall". After Kozodoyev's fellow passenger from the cruise ship, the "ordinary Soviet citizen" Semyon Gorbunkov (played by Nikulin), accidentally falls and says the code phrase, they mistake him for the courier. They place a cast around his arm and put the contraband jewels inside the cast. Upon the cruise ship's return to the Soviet Union, Gorbunkov lets the police know what happened, and the police captain, who is working undercover as a taxi driver, uses Gorbunkov as bait to catch the criminals. Gesha and Lyolik (another of Chief's henchmen, played by Papanov) attempt to lure Gorbunkov into situations where they can quietly, without a wetwork, remove the cast and reclaim the contraband jewels.

On one such occasion, Gesha invites Gorbunkov to a fancy restaurant with the intention of getting Gorbunkov drunk enough for Lyolik to subdue him. However, both Gesha and Gorbunkov become drunk and Gorbunkov is taken home by the police after he and Gesha cause a scene. Gorbunkov's wife, begins to suspect either that he has been recruited by foreign intelligence after finding a large amount of money and a gun loaded with blanks in Gorbunkov's possession (previously given to him by the police), or that he is having an affair. Gorbunkov explains that he is working with the Soviet police on a secret mission, but cannot divulge any details. The Chief sends Anna Sergeyevna, a female operative, to help retrieve the cast. Anna Sergeyevna invites Gorbunkov to her hotel room under the pretense of wanting to sell Gorbunkov a gown and spikes his drink with a sleeping pill. As Gorbunkov is about to pass out, his building's nosy superintendent who had followed Gorbunkov brings his wife into the hotel room before either Lyolik or the police can get to him.

Gorbunkov awakens the next morning to find that his wife has assumed that his story was all a cover up for an affair, and has left with the children. The police in the meantime have deduced that Gesha is involved with the smuggling scheme surrounding the cast, and ask Gorbunkov to mention to Gesha that he is planning to travel to another city and will have his cast removed there. Gesha reports this to the Chief, who sends Lyolik disguised as a taxi driver to pick up Gorbunkov. Gorbunkov assumes that Lyolik is also an undercover policeman, and gives away the fact that he has been in contact with the police the entire time. Lyolik plays along and tells Gorbunkov that he has been authorized to remove the cast a day early at a safehouse along the way to Dubrovka. As Lyolik is about to remove the cast, Gorbunkov deduces that Lyolik is actually a criminal and attempts to escape. Lyolik and Gesha chase Gorbunkov and with the help of the Chief himself, they capture Gorbunkov. Upon removing Gorbunkov's cast, they realize that the police had removed the diamonds in the cast a long time ago. The criminals kidnap Gorbunkov and attempt to flee as the police track them down in a helicopter and capture them. Gorbunkov is reunited with his family, with the police having explained the situation to his wife. Gorbunkov goes on vacation with his family, albeit now with a broken leg as a result of the kidnapping.

== Cast ==
- Yuri Nikulin, Semyon Semyonovich Gorbunkov, an economist at the State Institute for the Planning of Fisheries
- Nina Grebeshkova, Nadia, Gorbunkov's wife
- Andrei Mironov, Gennadiy Kozodoyev, aka Gesha, a model, Chief's assistant
- Anatoli Papanov, Lyolik, Chief's assistant, an auto mechanic and a tough guy with Belarusian accent
- Nonna Mordyukova, Varvara Pliushch, upravdom (building superintendent)
- Svetlana Svetlichnaya, Anna Sergeyevna, a femme fatale
- Stanislav Chekan, Mikhail Ivanovich, Captain, then Major of militsiya
- Vladimir Gulyaev, Volodya, Lieutenant of militsiya/Volodya's twin
- Andrei Fajt, salesman of lottery tickets, visitor of the restaurant "Weeping willow"
- Nikolay Trofimov, Colonel of militsiya
- Nikolay Romanov, Chief of crime gang
- Alexander Khvylya, Boris Savelyevich, maitre d'hotel of the restaurant "Weeping Willow"
- Tatyana Nikulina, tour guide
- Maksim Nikulin, boy with a net (not credited)
- Grigory Shpigel, head smuggler in Turkey
- Leonid Kanevsky, head smuggler's assistant
- Leonid Gaidai, alcoholic and the hand that chokes Kozodoyev in his dream (uncredited)
- Igor Yasulovich, dog owner
- Roman Filippov, visitor from Kolyma
- Viktoria Ostrovskaya, prostitute

== Production ==
American cars can be spotted in the Oriental city street scenes (which were actually shot in Baku, Azerbaijan, USSR): a 1954 Chevrolet 210, a 1955 Buick and a 1951 Oldsmobile Super 88. This would have been an extremely rare sighting because the United States had sanctions on the USSR and did not sell cars within the Eastern Bloc.

The ship docked at the beginning which Yuri Nikulin’s character boarded at port was actually the 1938 German built MS Rossyia'; formerly the MS Patria of Hamburg - America Line with the fictitious name ‘Mikhail Svetlov’ (after the poet) is seen on its hull when leaving port.

== Soundtrack ==
External videos
- The Island of Bad Luck; Gesha presents "the new hit" to Semyon Semyonovich

The Island of Bad Luck

The ironic "Ostrov nevezeniya" (Russian: Остров невезения, lit. 'The Island of Bad Luck') became popular after the film's release. It was sung in the movie by the Kozodoyev during the cruise as he strums a guitar while relaxing on the ship's deck. The song is thematic, as it presages the bad luck that Kozodoyev experiences throughout the entire film. The song was recorded by Mironov himself. This is not uncommon, as many Russian actors of that time were proficient in singing, as well as dancing.

The Song About Hares

The metaphorical "Pesnya pro zaytsev" (Russian: Песня про зайцев, lit. 'Song About Hares') also became a popular song during the late 1960s. It tells the story of a group of personified hares harvesting a mythological tryn herb (in Russian: tryn-trava) at night and proclaiming that they are not afraid of any predators, be they wolves or owls. The hares boldly sing a refrain which begins with "We don't care!" ("A нам всё равно!"), which is actually the meaning of "tryn-trava". The song was performed in the movie by the protagonist Semyon Gorbunkov after a heavy dose of vodka at the restaurant. Later, the scene was even depicted on a stamp dedicated to the actor Yuri Nikulin. Recorded by Nikulin himself.

Help Me

The third and final popular song from this film was "Pomogi mne" (Russian: Помоги мне, lit. 'Help Me') as performed by Aida Vedishcheva, a Soviet era singer best known for her performance of songs for films produced in the 1960s. The tango-styled parodic song is about love and passion, and is played in the background during a scene when a femme fatale hired by the Chief's henchmen attempts to seduce and drug Gorbunkov.

== See also ==
- The Undiamond Arm (2024)
