= Thieving Magpie (film) =

The Magpie
- Russian: Сорока-воровка
- Directed by: Naum Trakhtenberg
- Written by: Aleksandr Herzen; Nikolai Kovarsky
- Starring: Zinaida Kirienko; Nikolai Afanasyev; Vladimir Pokrovskiy; Viktor Korshunov; Anatoliy Kubatskiy
- Cinematography: Mark Dyatlov
- Edited by: Lyudmila Feyginova
- Music by: Vladimir Dekhterev
- Release date: 1958
- Running time: 79 minute
- Country: Soviet Union
- Language: Russian

Thieving Magpie (Russian: Сорока-воровка) is a 1958 Soviet drama film directed by Naum Trakhtenberg, based on the novel with the same name by Alexander Herzen.

The film takes place in Russia in the first half of the 19th century. The film tells about the successful actor Shchepin, visiting the theater of Prince Skalinsky, where he meets a gifted actress named Aneta.

== Plot ==
Actors Shchepin and Ugryumov, members of a struggling theater troupe, decide to seek better opportunities in the serf theater of the wealthy Prince Skalinsky. The prince warmly welcomes Shchepin, renowned for his talent, and his comedic companion Ugryumov. He immediately offers Shchepin the role of the judge in the play The Thieving Magpie. Shchepin is deeply impressed by the talent of Aneta, the actress playing the lead role.

Determined to meet Aneta, Shchepin initially faces resistance from the prince's servants but eventually secures the prince's permission for a meeting. During their conversation, Aneta shares her tragic story. Once owned by a different landowner who valued her as an actress, she had been pursued by Prince Skalinsky, who sought to acquire her for his theater. Her owner, however, refused to sell her. Before his death, he granted freedom to his theater troupe, including Aneta. However, his heir, tempted by the prince's money, bribed legal representatives to destroy the documents that freed the actors. Aneta became the prince's property. Skalinsky broke his promise to present her in the finest theaters of Moscow and St. Petersburg, rejecting an offer from the Imperial Theater Directorate to purchase her freedom. Instead, he demanded that she become his mistress. When Aneta refused, the prince began making her life unbearable. In retaliation, Aneta accepted the affections of her longtime secret admirer, Stepan.

Their conversation is interrupted by Stepan, who is being sent away as a conscript and wishes to bid Aneta farewell. Despite Shchepin's intervention, Stepan is denied a final meeting with her. Disillusioned by the prince's actions and empty promises, Shchepin decides to return to his old theater. Before he leaves, he learns that Aneta has attempted to take her own life. Gravely ill, she explains her actions to Shchepin: she does not want her unborn child to endure the life of a serf. At the theater, Shchepin announces to the audience that the performance will not take place because the lead actress has died, unwilling to live in bondage.

Shchepin and Ugryumov depart, returning to their old theater, leaving behind the oppressive world of the prince's serf theater.

== Cast ==
- Zinaida Kiriyenko as Aneta
- Nikolai Afanasyev as Shchepin (as N. Afanasyev)
- Vladimir Pokrovskiy as Knyaz (as V. Pokrovskiy)
- Viktor Korshunov as Stepan (as V. Korshunov)
- Anatoliy Kubatskiy as Ugryumov (as A. Kubatskiy)
- Sergei Kalinin as Upravlyayushchiy (as S. Kalinin)
- Aleksandr Grave as Naslednik (as V. Grave)
- Nikolai Shamin as Pomeshchik (as N. Shamin)
