= Blood Ties (1964 film) =

1964 film

- Russian: Родная кровь
- Directed by: Mikhail Yershov
- Written by: Fyodor Knorre (novel)
- Produced by: Alexander Arshansky
- Starring: Yevgeny Matveev; Vija Artmane
- Cinematography: Oleg Kukhovarenko
- Edited by: Aleksandra Borovskaya
- Music by: Veniamin Basner
- Production company: Lenfilm
- Release date: 1964
- Running time: 91 min.
- Country: Soviet Union
- Language: Russian

Blood Ties (Russian: Родная кровь, romanized: Rodnaya krov) is a 1964 Soviet World War II film directed by Mikhail Yershov.

== Plot ==
The film tells about Sergeant Vladimir Fedotov and a ferryman named Sonya, who met during the war and fell in love with each other.

== Cast ==
- Yevgeny Matveev as Sergeant Vladimir Feddotov
- Vija Artmane as Sonya, a ferryman
  - Tanya Doronina as Sonya in childhood
- Anatoliy Papanov as Sonya's ex-husband
- Roza Sverdlova as doctor
- Yuri Fisenko as Erik
- Igor Selyuzhenok as Gondzik
- Vladimir Ratomsky as Drovosekin
