= The Mysterious Monk =

- Directed by: Arkady Koltsaty
- Written by: Gely Ryabov; Aleksei Nagorny
- Starring: Vladimir Druzhnikov; Evgeny Zharikov; Valentin Zubkov; Tatyana Konyukhova
- Cinematography: Pyotr Terpsikhorov
- Music by: Nikita Bogoslovsky
- Distributed by: Mosfilm
- Release date: 1967
- Running time: 83 min
- Country: Soviet Union
- Language: Russian

Mysterious Monk (Russian: Таинственный монах, romanized: Tainstvenniy monakh) is a 1967 Stereoscopic 3-D action film directed by Arkady Koltsaty starring Vladimir Druzhnikov, Evgeny Zharikov, Valentin Zubkov and Tatyana Konyukhova. It was filmed in the Soviet stereoscopic system “Stereo-70”. For many years it held the record among Soviet stereofilms for the most rentals, for both 3D and 2D screenings.

== Plot ==
Set during the Russian Civil War, Ukraine, in the autumn of 1920, two Chekist former circus performers attempt to foil the plans of the White Russian army, remnants of which have hidden in a monastery. A more experienced Chekist enters the monastery in the guise of Lieutenant Stronsky to uncover the enemy's plans.

== Cast ==
- Vladimir Druzhnikov as Vorontsov
- Evgeny Zharikov as Latyshev
- Valentin Zubkov as Lobov
- Tatyana Konyukhova as Zinaida Pavlovna
- Stanislav Chekan as Yelpidifor
- Aleksandr Belyavsky as Stronsky
- Pyotr Sobolevsky
