= Green Van =

- Russian: Зелёный фургон
- Directed by: Genrikh Gabay
- Written by: Grigori Pozhenyan; Aleksandr Kozachinskiy
- Starring: Roman Filippov; Dmitri Ivanov; Vladimir Kolokoltsev; Konstantin Kulchitsky; Olga Lysenko
- Music by: Boris Karamyshev; Igor Yakushenko
- Release date: 1959
- Running time: 78 minute
- Country: Soviet Union
- Language: Russian

Green Van (Russian: Зелёный фургон) is a 1959 Soviet action film directed by Genrikh Gabay.

== Plot ==
The film takes place in 1920. The Red Army enters Odessa and is trying to clear it of crime. The Chekists hope that the workers and peasants youth will help them in this.

== Cast ==
- Roman Filippov as Fedka Byk
- Dmitri Ivanov
- Vladimir Kolokoltsev as Volodya Kozachenko
- Konstantin Kulchitsky as owner of wagon
- Olga Lysenko as Marusya Tsymbalyuk
- Igor Maksimov
- Dmitri Milyutenko as grandfather Taras
- Viktor Mizinenko as Viktor Prokofievich Shestakov
- Stanislava Shimanskaya as Selyanka
- Yuri Timoshenko as Grishchenko
