= The Wrestler and the Clown =

- Russian poster
- Russian: Борец и клоун
- Directed by: Boris Barnet; Konstantin Yudin
- Written by: Nikolay Pogodin
- Produced by: Lev Durasov
- Starring: Stanislav Chekan; Aleksandr Mikhaylov; Yuriy Medvedev; Iya Arepina; Boris Petker
- Cinematography: Sergei Poluyanov
- Music by: Yuriy Biryukov
- Production company: Mosfilm
- Release date: 1957
- Running time: 95 minutes
- Country: Soviet Union
- Language: Russian

The Wrestler and the Clown (Russian: Борец и клоун, romanized: Borets i kloun) is a 1957 Soviet sports drama film directed by Boris Barnet and Konstantin Yudin.

== Plot ==
Odessa at the turn of the XIX-XX centuries. Loader and amateur wrestler Ivan Poddubny comes to the circus and meets the clown trainer Anatoly Durov. Artists have to go through trials and humiliations. The circus manager mercilessly exploits artists who are bound by a slave contract. The talent and hard work of Poddubny and Durov allows them to go beyond the provincial circus and make an international career.

As a result, Poddubny, defeating the Frenchman Raoul le Boucher in the final, becomes the winner of the world wrestling championship, which was held in Paris.

== Cast ==
- Stanislav Chekan as Ivan Poddubny
- Aleksandr Mikhaylov as Anatoli Leonidovich Durov
- Yuriy Medvedev as Nikita, Ivan's pal
- Iya Arepina as Mimi
- Boris Petker as Giuseppe Truzzi
- Leonid Topchiyev as Orlando
- Tamara Loginova as Durov's wife
- Georgiy Vitsin as Enrico, a clown
- Kyunna Ignatova as Esterina Truzzi
- Stepan Kayukov as Vanya, wrestling contest promoter
- Grigoriy Shpigel as Solomonsky
- Anatoliy Solovyov as Raoul Boucher
- Grigori Abrikosov as Mr. Fish
- Maya Kazakova as Alena
- Polina Nyatko as Ivan's Mother
- Aleksandr Gumburg as Ivan's Father
- Alexander Khvylya as Boucher's coach
