= Mozart and Salieri (film) =

1962 Soviet film

- Russian: Моцарт и Сальери
- Written by: Alexander Pushkin
- Directed by: Vladimir Gorikker
- Starring: Pyotr Glebov; Innokenty Smoktunovsky
- Music by: Nikolai Rimsky-Korsakov
- Country of origin: Soviet Union
- Original language: Russian

Production
- Running time: 45 min.

Original release
- Release: 1962

Mozart and Salieri (Russian: Моцарт и Сальери) is a 1962 Soviet television historical drama film directed by Vladimir Gorikker.

== Plot ==
The film is based on eponymous play of Alexander Pushkin.

== Cast ==
- Pyotr Glebov as Antonio Salieri (vocal by Alexander Pirogov)
- Innokenty Smoktunovsky as Wolfgang Amadeus Mozart (vocal by Sergei Lemeshev)
- Arnolds Mīlbrets as blind musician
- Nikolai Kutuzov as black person
