= Vladimir Zemlyanikin =

Film and theatre actor

- Born: Vladimir Mikhailovich Zemlyanikin; 27 October 1933; Moscow, USSR
- Died: 27 October 2016 (aged 83); Moscow, Russia
- Occupation: Actor
- Years active: 1954–2016

Vladimir Mikhailovich Zemlyanikin (Russian: Владимир Михайлович Земляникин; 27 October 1933 – 27 October 2016) was a film and theater actor. He was an Honored Artist of the Russian Federation (1994).

== Biography ==
Vladimir Zemlyanikin born in Moscow on 27 October 1933.

With the onset of World War II, he and his mother were evacuated. After the war, Vladimir became involved in the initiative in the City Palace of Pioneers, and then in the Palace of Culture ZiL.

In 1951, Vladimir filed documents in the Moscow Art Theater School, School Shchepkin, Boris Shchukin Theatre Institute. They took it to the Shchukin Institute.

In 1954, Zemlyanikin debuted in the movie, Tatyana Lukashevich's film Certificate of Maturity. In 1956, he graduated from institute.

Before 1959, he was a Studio Theatre actor and film actor in Moscow. He later worked at the Sovremennik Theatre.

He died on 27 October 2016, his 83rd birthday.

== Personal life ==
- First wife — Lyubov Lifentsova (Strizhenova). In this marriage a daughter, Elena.
- Who is married to journalist Lyudmila Yegorova (Zemlyanikina).

== Filmography ==
- 1954 — Problem Child
- 1954 — Certificate of Maturity
- 1956 — Different Fates
- 1957 — The House I Live In
- 1957 — The Story of First Love
- 1959 — Chernomorochka
- 1959 — The Unamenables
- 1960 — Noisy Day
- 1963 — Silence
- 1965 — A Traveler with Luggage
- 1966 — Build Bridges
- 1972 — Big School-Break
- 1973 — Eternal Call
- 1979 — Particularly Important Task
- 1982 — Department
- 1985 — Battle of Moscow
- 1985 — Road Anna Firling
- 1990 — Fools Die on Friday
- 1992 — Murder on Zdanovskaya
- 2003 — Marsh Turetskogo
- 2007 — Lenin's Testament
- 2008 — Alias Albanian 2
- 2008 — Whirlwind
- 2010 — Three Women of Dostoyevsky
- 2011 — Red Fountains
