= Crazy Money =

1981 Soviet film

- Russian poster
- Russian: Бешеные деньги
- Directed by: Yevgeny Matveyev
- Based on: Бешеные деньги by Alexander Ostrovsky
- Produced by: Yevgeny Matveyev
- Starring: Aleksandr Mikhailov
- Production company: Mosfilm
- Release date: 1981 (Soviet Union)
- Running time: 87 minutes

Crazy Money (Russian: Бешеные деньги) is a 1981 comedy and historical film from the Soviet Union.

The film was directed by Yevgeny Matveyev, produced by Yevgeny Matveyev, and composed by Evgueni Ptitchkine; Aleksandr Yakovlevich Mikhailov starred. Based on a play of the same name by Alexander Ostrovsky, the 87-minute film was put out by Mosfilm.

== Plot ==
Set in mid-19th century Moscow, the story follows Savva Gennadyevich Vasilkov, a middle-aged provincial merchant who falls in love with the beautiful Lydia Yuryevna Cheboksarova. To meet her, he enlists the help of his acquaintance Telyatev, who, along with his friend Glumov, devises a plan to prank Lydia’s mother, Nadezhda Antonovna. Nadezhda, eager to find a wealthy son-in-law, is misled into believing Vasilkov is a millionaire gold miner from Siberia.

Vasilkov begins visiting the Cheboksarov household, but his provincial manners clash with Lydia's aspirations of marrying into high society. Meanwhile, Nadezhda receives news from her husband about the urgent need to sell their last estate to settle debts. She turns to the elderly Prince Kuchumov, who is also captivated by Lydia's beauty, but he offers only empty promises. Pressured by her mother to secure a wealthy husband, Lydia initially sets her sights on Telyatev, who only seeks a casual flirtation and refuses to marry. Eventually, Lydia weds the devoted Vasilkov.

The Cheboksarovs continue their extravagant lifestyle on credit, and Vasilkov soon discovers their massive debts, which he is expected to pay. He agrees, but only if they reduce their expenses, dismiss some servants, and move to a more modest home. Lydia finds these terms humiliating but reluctantly complies. Despite their new living situation, she maintains relationships with her former admirers, Telyatev and Kuchumov, hoping for financial support. Persuaded by Kuchumov's promises, she decides to leave Vasilkov and move back to their luxurious apartment.

On the day of her departure, Vasilkov catches Lydia flirting with Kuchumov and dismisses her in despair. Triumphant, Lydia moves back into the grand mansion, expecting Kuchumov to fulfill his promises. However, Telyatev reveals that Kuchumov has squandered his fortune and, like the Cheboksarovs, is penniless. Realizing her mistake, Lydia sends her mother to plead with Vasilkov for forgiveness.

Vasilkov agrees to settle Lydia's debts but imposes a condition: she must serve as a housekeeper in his mother's household for a period as a form of penance. Only after completing this "rehabilitation" will he consider taking her to Saint Petersburg. Initially outraged, Lydia eventually accepts, recognizing her dire circumstances, and resolves to reform her ways.
