= The House I Live In (1957 film) =

1957 film by Yakov Segel and Lev Kulidzhanov

- Directed by: Lev Kulidzhanov; Yakov Segel
- Written by: Joseph Olshansky; Nina Rudneva
- Produced by: N. Petrova
- Starring: Vladimir Zemlyanikin; Yevgeny Matveyev; Rimma Shorohova; Valentina Telegina; Nikolay Elizarov; Zhanna Bolotova
- Cinematography: Vyacheslav Shumsky
- Edited by: Lydia Rodionova
- Music by: Yuri Biryukov
- Production company: Gorky Film Studio
- Release date: December 23, 1957
- Running time: 100 min
- Country: Soviet Union
- Language: Russian

The House I Live In (Russian: Дом, в котором я живу, romanized: Dom, v kotorom ya zhivu) is a Soviet war romance film, shot in the Gorky Film Studio in 1957, directed by Lev Kulidzhanov and Yakov Segel.

The film was the movie premiere of Zhanna Bolotova.

The story begins in 1935, as some recent arrivals occupy a new house on the outskirts of Moscow. The occupants' lives throughout the events of the Second World War are chronicled.

== Plot ==
The story begins in 1935, when two families move into a communal apartment on the outskirts of Moscow: the Davydovs, with their three children, and newlyweds Dmitry and Lida Kashirin. The Davydovs are the central figures, with the narrative focusing on their lives and relationships. As the children grow up, they and the surrounding adults grapple with questions about identity, purpose, and morality, navigating conflicts, reconciliations, and life’s complexities.

Lida Kashirina feels no love for her husband Dmitry, a geologist frequently away on expeditions. During one of his absences, Konstantin Davydov, a soldier and the son of the Davydovs, visits his family and becomes romantically involved with Lida. Overcome with guilt, Lida faces condemnation from Konstantin’s mother, Klavdia Kondratyevna, while Dmitry remains oblivious upon his return, struggling to understand Lida’s sudden urge to leave their home.

Meanwhile, Sergey Davydov harbors feelings for his childhood friend Galya Volynskaya, who dreams of becoming an actress. Galya’s ambitions create friction, but she perseveres, even seeking guidance from a former actress to prepare for theater school. Inspired by Dmitry Kashirin, Sergey develops an interest in geology.

The outbreak of World War II shatters their peaceful lives, altering relationships and priorities. Tragedy strikes as Dmitry Kashirin and Pavel Davydov do not survive the war, and Konstantin returns disabled. Sergey comes back as a war hero, only to learn that Galya, the dreamer he cherished, has been killed.

After the war, the characters attempt to rebuild their lives. Sergey enrolls in a geology institute, while Konstantin hopes Lida can forgive herself and reciprocate his enduring love. Even Klavdia Kondratyevna softens her attitude toward Lida, signaling a path toward healing and renewal.

== Cast ==
- Vladimir Zemlyanikin as Seryozha
- Yevgeny Matveyev as Konstantin
- Rimma Shorohova as Katya
- Valentina Telegina as Klavdia Kondratyevna Davydova
- Nikolay Elizarov as Pavel Davydov
- Pavel Shalnov as Nikolay
- Mikhail Ulyanov as Dmitry Fedorovich Kashirin, geologist
- Ninel Myshkova as Lida Kashirina
- Klavdia Yelanskaya as Ksenia Nikolaevna, actress
- Zhanna Bolotova as Galya Volynskaya
- Cleopatra Alperova as Elena Petrovna Volynskaya
- Lev Kulidzhanov as Vadim Nikolaevich Volynsky
- Jura Myasnikov as Sergey in the childhood
- Zoya Danilina as Galya as a child

Song composer of Yuri Biryukov to words of Alexey Fatyanov Silence of Rogozhskaya Force (Russian: Тишина за Рогожской заставою) takes Nikolai Rybnikov.

== Release ==
The premiere of the film took place in the Soviet Union on 23 December 1957. It was the 9th most distributed film of that year, with 28.9 million viewers.
