= Stanislav Chekan =

Soviet actor (1922–1994)

- Born: Stanislav Yulianovich Chekan; 2 June 1922; Rostov-on-Don, Rostov Oblast, RSFSR
- Died: 11 August 1994 (aged 72); Moscow, Russia
- Occupation: Actor
- Years active: 1945–1993

Stanislav Yulianovich Chekan (Russian: Станисла́в Юлиа́нович Чека́н; 2 June 1922 – 11 August 1994) was a Soviet actor of theater and cinema, known primarily for his blue-collar manly appearance, and character actor roles of a stereotypical "big guy".

== Biography ==
Stanislav Chekan was born in Rostov-on-Don on 2 June 1922. When he was 15 years old, his father was arrested as an enemy of the people. Stanislav was sent to a labor colony, where he first began to participate in amateur activities. Then he was sent to a vocational school, but on the way he turned to Rostov, where he entered another school, a theater school.

From 1938 to 1941, he studied at the studio of Yuri Zavadsky in the Theater School of Rostov-on-Don.

He was a member of the Great Patriotic War, fought near Novorossiysk, and after a serious injury became an actor with the front-line theater.

In 1945, Chekan became an actor of the Odessa Theater of the Soviet Army. From 1948 to 1956, he was an actor with the Central Academic Theater of the Soviet Army in Moscow, and from 1958 to 1993 with the National Film Actors' Theatre.

Chekan was a textured and colourful character artist. As a rule, his screen characters are real working men. Soviet and Russian viewers know him for the role of Mikhail Ivanovich, the police captain, in Leonid Gaidai's legendary comedy The Diamond Arm.

Chekan died in Moscow on 11 August 1994 after a long illness. He was buried in Moscow at the Vagankovo Cemetery.

== Selected filmography ==
- Son of the Regiment (1946) as soldier
- Blue Roads (1948) as Kapitan-leytenant (uncredited)
- Taras Shevchenko (1951) as cabby
- A Fortress in the Mountains (1953) as Martshenko
- Devotion (1954) as Vasya Zhuk
- Behind the Footlights (1956) as Stepan, coachman
- The Wrestler and the Clown (1957) as Ivan Poddubny
- Annushka (1959) as Soldat
- Hussar Ballad (1962) as Guerilla (uncredited)
- Amphibian Man (1962) as prison guard
- Introduction to Life (1963) as captain
- The First Trolleybus (1963) as First Trolleybus Driver
- War and Peace (1966) as Tikhon Scherbaty
- Two Tickets for a Daytime Picture Show (1967) as Sabodazh
- The Mysterious Monk (1968) as Elpidifor
- The New Adventures of the Elusive Avengers (1968) as 1 st filer in the pot
- The Brothers Karamazov (1969) as Samsonov's son
- The Diamond Arm (1969) as Mikhail Ivanovoch, Captain, then Major of militsiya
- Sevastopol (1970) as Boatswain
- The Crown of the Russian Empire, or Once Again the Elusive Avengers (1971) as a man from the Emperor's suite
- Investigation Held by ZnaToKi: Dead to Rights (1971, TV Movie) as Silin
- Privalov's Millions (1973) as Kuzma Ferapontovich Kanunnikov
- Northern Rhapsody (1974) as Karp Sevastyanov
- Earthly Love (1975) as Koshev
- Shtorm na sushe (1976) as Dyagenka
- How Czar Peter the Great Married Off His Moor (1976) as marshal
- Destiny (1977) as Pavel Koshev
- Incognito from St. Petersburg (1978) as Ivan Karpovich Uhovertov, marshal
- Life Is Beautiful (1979) as a prisoner
- Vertical Race (1982, TV Movie) as captain of militia

== Recognition and rewards ==
- Medal "For the Defence of the Caucasus" (1944)
- Medal "For the Victory over Germany in the Great Patriotic War 1941–1945" (1945)
- Honored Artist of the RSFSR (1955)
- Jubilee Medal "Twenty Years of Victory in the Great Patriotic War 1941–1945" (1965)
- Order of the Badge of Honour (1974)
- Jubilee Medal "Thirty Years of Victory in the Great Patriotic War 1941–1945" (1975)
- Order of the Patriotic War 2nd class (1989)
- Medal "Veteran of Labour" (1989)
