= Close to Us =

1958 film

- Russian: Рядом с нами
- Directed by: Adolf Bergunker
- Written by: Yelena Katerli; Izrail Metter
- Starring: Leonid Bykov; Innokenty Smoktunovsky; Klara Luchko; Georgi Yumatov; Nikolai Rybnikov
- Cinematography: Semyon Ivanov
- Edited by: Aleksandra Borovskaya
- Music by: Orest Yevlakhov
- Production company: Lenfilm
- Release date: January 6, 1958
- Running time: 94 min.
- Country: Soviet Union
- Language: Russian

Close to Us (Russian: Рядом с нами, romanized: Ryadom s nami) is a 1958 Soviet drama film directed by Adolf Bergunker.

== Plot ==
After graduating from Moscow institutes, Andrey and Nikolay head to work in the Altai region, taking positions at a local factory. Nikolay becomes an engineer, while Andrey works as a correspondent and editor for the factory's newspaper. Tasked with writing an article about the entire workforce, Andrey uncovers deeper issues within the organization.

Nikolay, proactive in his role, begins to notice irregularities in the factory's operations. The celebrated worker, Yasha Milovidov, who is touted as a model employee, turns out to be an ordinary laborer benefiting from manipulated conditions that allow him to exceed his quotas. This fabricated image of success was created by the previous editor of the factory newspaper, Chumov. Further complicating Milovidov’s reputation is his abandonment of a pregnant coworker, Antonina. Together, Andrey and Nikolay expose the false hero, bringing the truth to light.

== Cast ==
- Leonid Bykov as Nikolay
- Innokenty Smoktunovsky as Andrey
- Klara Luchko as Antonina
- Georgi Yumatov as Yasha Mulovidov
- Nikolai Rybnikov as Chumov
- Nina Doroshina as Lyuba Zvonaryova
- Lyudmila Shagalova as Nina
- Boris Chirkov as Stoletov
- Zinaida Sharko as Telegraph operator
- Vladislav Strzhelchik as Kovalyov
- Boris Arakelov as Yura
- Oleg Yefremov as Komsomol secretary
- Rimma Markova as mother of many children (movie debut)
- Zinaida Sharko as telegraph operator
