= Lyudmila Khityaeva =

Soviet and Russian actress

- Людмила Хитяева
- Born: 15 August 1930 (age 95); Nizhny Novgorod Russian SFSR
- Years active: 1957—present

Lyudmila Ivanovna Khityaeva (Russian: Людмила Ивановна Хитяева; born 15 August 1930) is a Soviet and Russian theater and film actress, TV presenter. People's Artist of the RSFSR (1983).

== Filmography ==
- Ekaterina Voronina (1957)
- And Quiet Flows the Don (1958)
- Virgin Soil Upturned (1959–61)
- The Night Before Christmas (1961)
- Yevdokiya (1961)
- The Cook (1965)
- Russian Field (1971)
- Privalov's Millions (1972)
- Finist, the brave Falcon (1975)
