= Destiny (1977 film) =

- Directed by: Yevgeny Matveyev
- Written by: Yevgeny Matveyev; Pyotr Proskurin
- Starring: Yevgeny Matveyev; Olga Ostroumova; Yury Yakovlev
- Cinematography: Victor Yakushev; Genadiy Tsekaviy
- Music by: Yevgeny Ptichkin
- Production company: Mosfilm
- Release date: 1977
- Running time: 170 min.
- Country: Soviet Union
- Language: Russian

Destiny (Russian: Судьба, romanized: Sudba) is a 1977 World War II film directed by Yevgeny Matveyev and starring Matveyev, Olga Ostroumova, Yury Yakovlev, screen adaptation of Pyotr Proskurin's second book, the novel Earthy Love. This film had 57,8 million spectators in 1978. Evgeniy Matveyev was honored with State Prize of the USSR for Destiny in 1978.

== Plot ==
The plot follows married chairman kolkhoz Zakhar Deryugin, who begins an affair with a young woman Mannya Polivanova during a harvest in Russian village of 30th. During World War II Zakhar Deryugin is mobilized and sent to the front. While the battles he is taken as a prisoner and makes runaway. Bryukhanov's wife Katya appears in occupation. Not having achieved Katya's consent to cooperation, Germans, having slandered, secretly execute her. Senior son of Deryugin's perishes from a fascist bullet. His mother Evfrosinya burns sleeping fascists in her own house. In return Germans prepare for the retaliatory action, but Zakhar alone with guerrillas rush into village and rescue its inhabitants.

== Main cast ==
- Yevgeny Matveyev as Zakhar Deriugin
- Olga Ostroumova as Manya
- Zinaida Kiriyenko as Efrosinya
- Yury Yakovlev as Tikhon
- Valeriya Zaklunna as Katerina
- Vadim Spiridonov as Fyodor Makashin
- Irina Skobtseva as Elizaveta
- Viktor Khokhryakov as Chubarov
- Vladimir Samoilov as Rodion Anisimov
- Stanislav Chekan as Pavel Semyonovich Koshev
- Georgi Yumatov as Pekarev, guerrillas
- Algimantas Masiulis as Sturmbannführer Zolding
