= Pyotr Glebov =

Russian actor

- Пётр Глебов
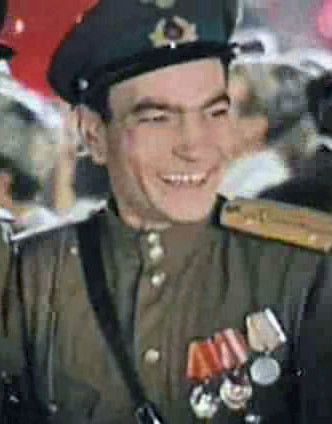
- Glebov in The Train Goes East (1947)
- Born: April 14, 1915; Moscow, Russian Empire
- Died: April 17, 2000 (aged 85); Moscow, Russia
- Occupation: Actor

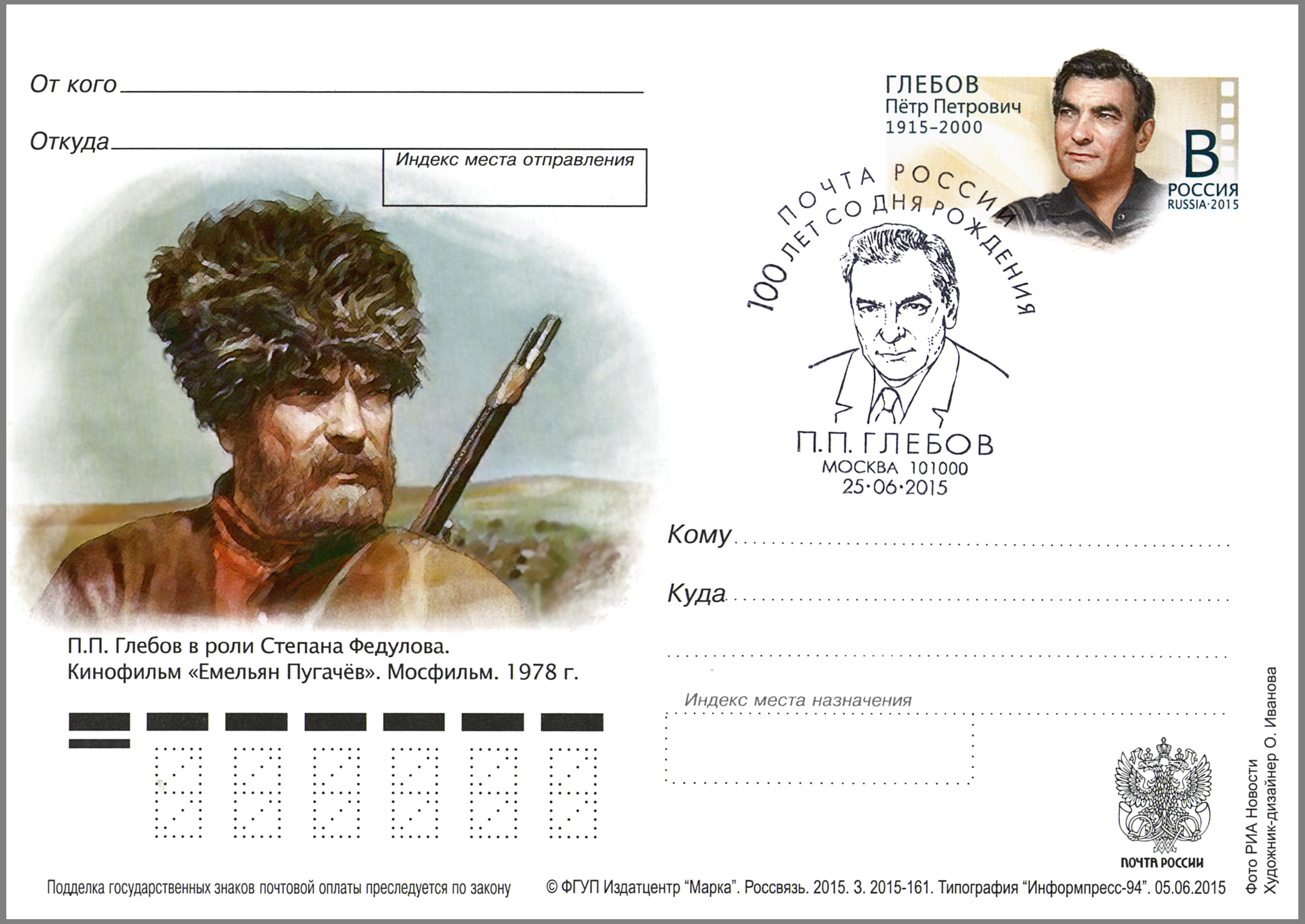
A postal card issued to commemorate the 100th birth anniversary of Pyotr Glebov.

Pyotr Petrovich Glebov (Note: Russian: Пётр Петро́вич Гле́бов, romanized: Pyotr Petrovich Glebov) (14 April 1915 – 17 April 2000), was a Russian film actor from the Russian noble Glebov family.

In 1940, Glebov graduated from the Stanislavsky School where his teachers included Mikhail Kedrov. When World War II broke out, the young actor volunteered to fight for the Red Army. He took part in the Battle of Moscow as an anti-aircraft gunner.

Glebov is best known for portraying the major protagonist, Grigory Melekhov, in the 1958 epic And Quiet Flows the Don, a trilogy directed by Sergei Gerasimov.

In 1981, Glebov was awarded the honorary title People's Artist of the USSR and was awarded the Order of Lenin. He is buried in the Vagankovo Cemetery.

== Partial filmography ==
- The Beloved (1940) - Spectator in the stands (uncredited)
- Mechta (1943)
- The Train Goes East (1948) - Military on the station in Moscow (uncredited)
- And Quiet Flows the Don (1957-1958, part 2, 3) - Grigory Melekhov
- Virgin Soil Upturned (1960, part 1, 2) - Aleksandr Polovtsev
- Baltic Skies (1961, part 1, 2) - Lunin
- Mozart and Salieri (1962) - Salieri
- Iolanta (1963) - Eon-Hakkia
- The Tsar's Bride (1965) - Tsar Ivan
- Odinochestvo (1965) - Pyotr Storozhev
- A teper sudi... (1967) - Illarion Groza
- Oni zhivut ryadom (1968) - Korablyov
- Retribution (1969)
- Not Under the Jurisdiction (1969) - Pyotr Samoylov
- Liberation (1970, part 1, 3) - Pavel Rotmistrov
- Morskoy kharakter (1970) - Yakov Ivanovich Arkhipov
- Kochuyushchiy front (1971) - Petr Zhtzhinkin
- Smertnyy vrag (1972) - Vlas
- Sluchaynyy adres (1973) - Ivan Kupriyanovich
- Dawn Over the Drava (1974)
- Smotret v glaza... (1975) - Ivan Davidenko
- At the World's Limit (1975) - uncle Vasya
- Na yasnyy ogon (1976) - Predsedatel gubkoma
- Pugachev (1979) - Stepan Fedulov
- The Youth of Peter the Great (1980)
- Vsadnik na zolotom kone (1981) - Katil-Badtscha
- Muzhiki! (1981) - father of Pavel
- Formula sveta (1982)
- Polyn — trava gorkaya (1983)
- Uragan prikhodit neozhidanno (1984)
- Nasledstvo (1984)
- Idushchiy sledom (1984)
- Postaraysya ostatsya zhivym (1986) - General Arhipov
- Skakal kazak cherez dolinu (1986) - Lukich- militsioner
- Premyera v Sosnovke (1986) - Aleksey Nikiforovich
- Bez sroka davnosti (1987)
- Dedushka khoroshiy, no... ne govorit, kuda spryatal den'gi (1993)
- Bravye parni (1993) - Maj. Konstantin Cherednichenko (final film role)
