= Yevgeny Matveyev =

Soviet and Russian actor and film director

- Евгений Матвеев
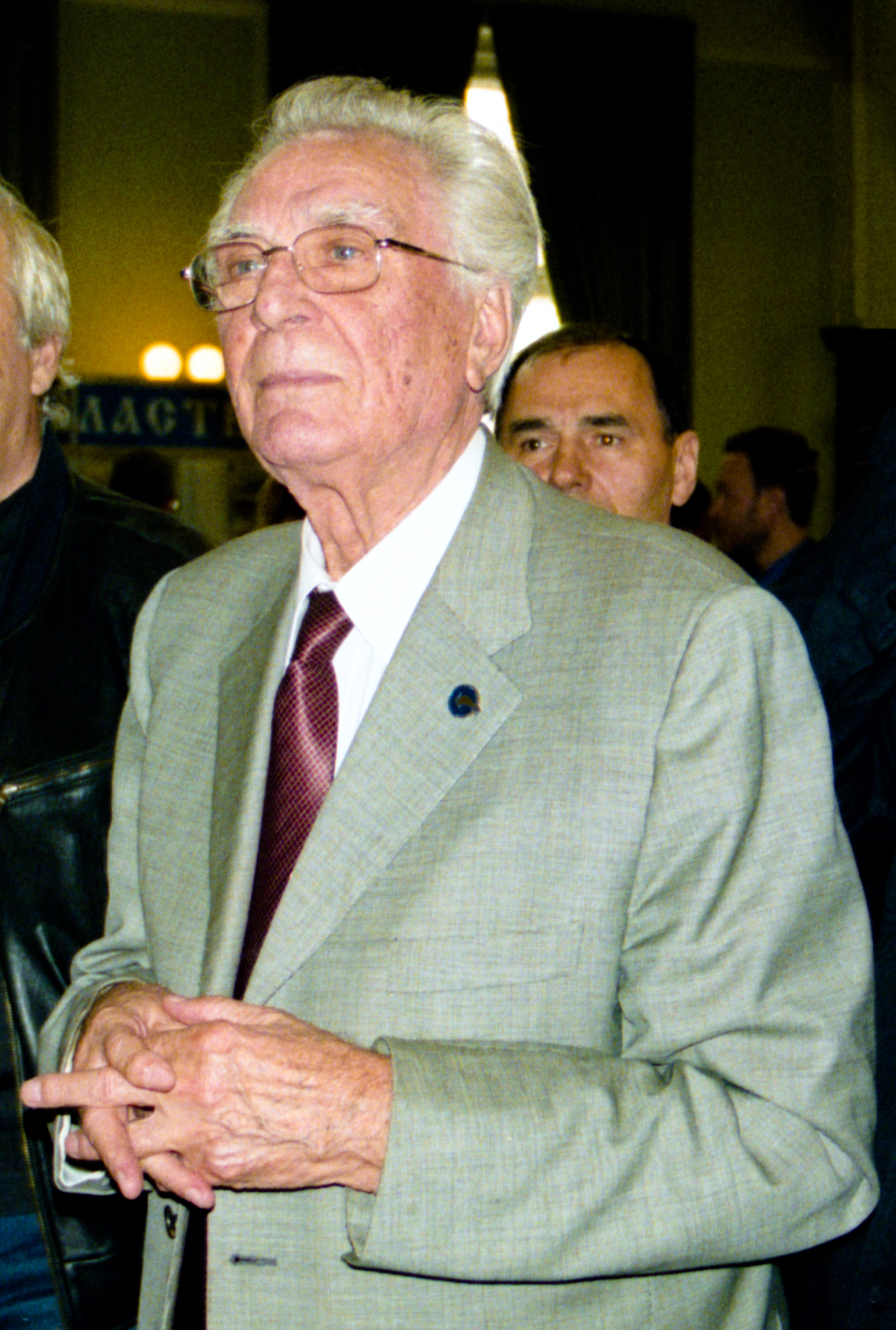
- Matveyev in 2002
- Born: Yevgeny Semyonovich Matveyev; 8 March 1922; Novoukrainka, Kherson Oblast, Ukrainian SSR
- Died: 1 June 2003 (aged 81); Moscow, Russia
- Occupations: Actor, film director, screenwriter
- Years active: 1939–1999
- Notable work: Earthly Love (1975); Destiny (1977)
- Title: People's Artist of the USSR (1974)
- Spouse: Lidiya Alexeyevna Matveyeva (m. 1947)
- Parent(s): Semyon Kalinovich Matveyev; Nadezhda Fyodorovna Kovalenko
- Awards: USSR State Prize (1977)
- Military career
- Allegiance: Soviet Union
- Branch: Soviet Army
- Service years: 1941-1946
- Rank: Lieutenant

Yevgeny Semyonovich Matveyev (Russian: Евгений Семёнович Матвеев, Ukrainian: Євген Семенович Матвеев; 8 March 1922 – 1 June 2003) was a Soviet and Russian actor and film director who was named a People's Artist of the USSR in 1974. He is best known as Nagulnov in Virgin Soil Upturned, based on Mikhail Sholokhov's novel; and Nekhludov in Resurrection (Russian: Воскресение), based on Leo Tolstoy's novel.

== Early years ==
Yevgeny Matveyev was born in the village of Novoukrainka in the Mykolaiv Governorate of the Ukrainian Soviet Socialist Republic (now Kherson Oblast, Ukraine) to Semyon Kalinovich Matveyev, a Russian Red Army serviceman, who was stationed in the region at the end of the Russian Civil War, and Nadezhda Fyodorovna Kovalenko, a Ukrainian peasant woman, on 8 March 1922. His father left Nadezhda shortly after he was born.

He attended school in the nearby town of Tsyurupinsk, where he saw his first play and left school after the ninth grade to pursue a career in acting.

He made his first step on the professional stage at the Kherson Theater, in 1939. One of his first small stage roles was a part of a musician in Bestalanna. Russian actor Nikolay Cherkasov noticed the young talent and advised Matveyev to continue his acting career, by moving to Kyiv to study with Alexander Dovzhenko. Doing so, Matveyev studied under Dovzhenko at the acting school of the Kiev Film Studio in 1940 and 1941.

Matveyev joined the Red Army after the German invasion in 1941, and went to military school in Tyumen. After graduation, Lieutenant Matveyev was mobilized into the Red Army and fought in World War II. After the end of the war, Matveyev worked for a year at the military school in Tyumen, as a director of the school's amateur theater art group, where he met his future wife, Lidiya Matveyeva. They married in April 1947.

== Stage and screen success ==
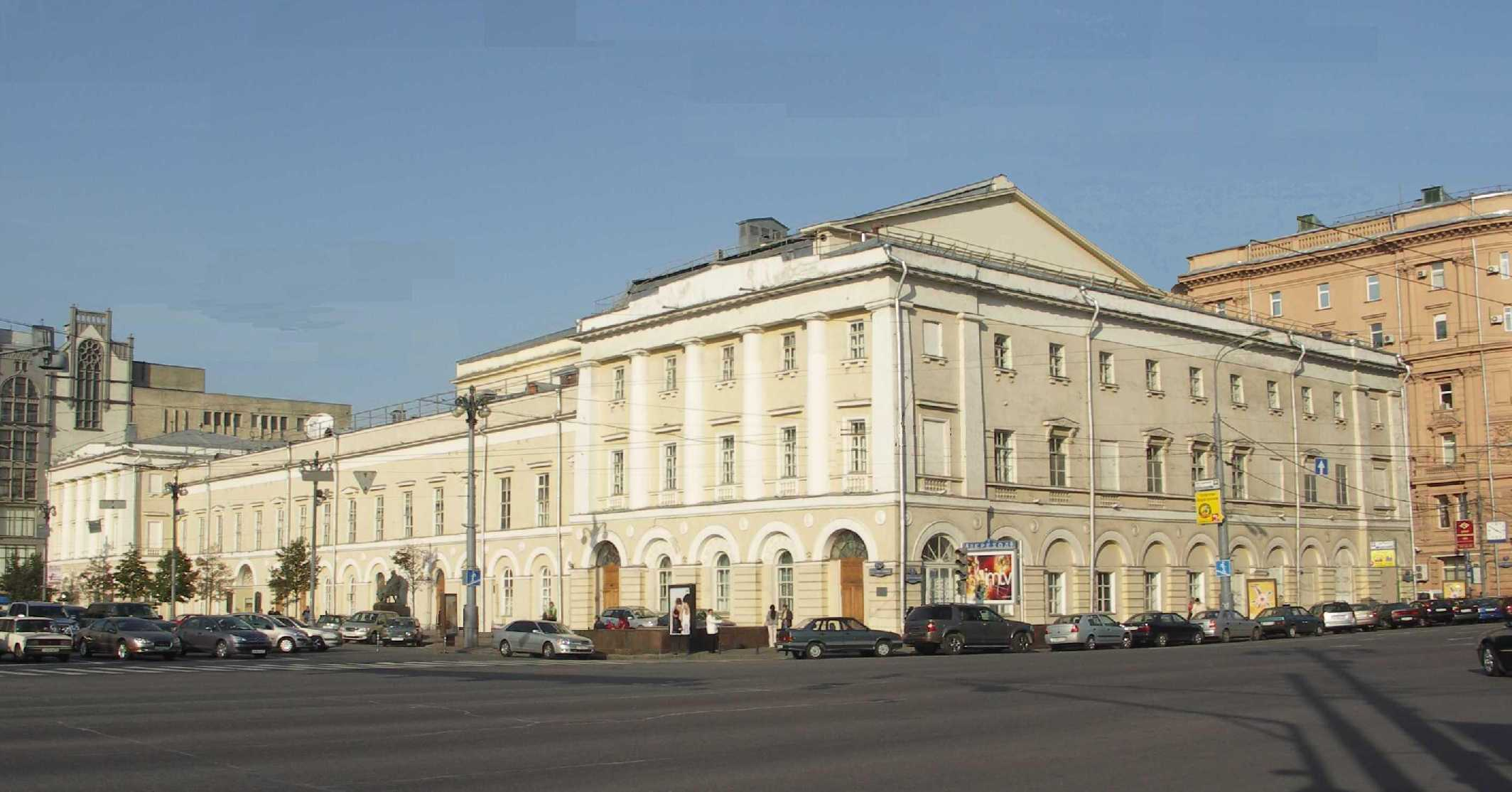
Maly Theater. Theater Square (Moscow)

After completing his military service in 1946, Matveyev acted at the Tyumen Drama Theater for two years and at the Red Torch Theater in Novosibirsk from 1948 to 1952. In 1952, Matveyev went to Moscow to join the famed Maly Theater, where he continued his stage career until 1968.

His various roles on the stage included Neznamov in Alexander Ostrovsky's drama Bez viny vinovatye, Zvonorev in Port Arthur, Yarovoy in Love of Yarovoy by Trenyev, Rodon in an adaptation of William Makepeace Thackeray's Vanity Fair, Trofimov in Alyoshin's Leading Role, Stolbov in Autumn Sunrise, Erast in Ostrovsky's Heart Not a Stone, and Osvald in Ibsen's Ghosts.

Matveyev broke into film in the 1950s, when he starred as Sudbinin in Andrey Frolov's 1955 film Good Morning, a musical comedy. He played the leading part of Konstantin Davydov in The House I Live In, a 1955 film by Lev Kulidzhanov and Yakov Segel that won the first prize at the All-Union Film Festival. Matveyev achieved greater fame when he starred as Nagulnov in Virgin Soil Upturned, and played the role of Prince Nekhludov in Mikhail Shveitser's Resurrection, an adaptation of Tolstoy's novel. More of his notable roles during this period included the part of Fedotov in Blood Ties, in 1963, starring opposite Vija Artmane. The film won special prizes at international film festivals, including the Mar del Plata International Film Festival and in Buenos Aires, and also at the 1964 All-Union Film Festival in Leningrad.

== Directing and acting ==
At the height of his fame, Matveyev's career as an actor came to a sudden end at a holiday celebration in Nikolaev, in what is now Ukraine: during a show, he fell off a malfunctioning cart; injuring his spine, crushing two disks, and jamming spinal nerves. After a long period of treatment, despite the opinion of his physician, he returned to work. Though the Soviet government had classified him in the third group of individuals with disabilities, those persons who had lost some capacity but were still capable of working, generally part-time; he quit performing on the stage and instead became a film director.

His debut as a director was the 1967 film, The Gypsy, an adaptation of Anatoly Kalinin's novel. He also starred as Budulay, acting alongside Lyudmila Khityaeva in that film. Matveyev's first picture was greeted with differing opinions in the Soviet Union; though a survey by the magazine Soviet Screen named him one of the best actors of 1967, there were a lot of critical remarks. From 1968 onward, Matveyev completely left theatre and continued his career in the film industry, as a director and an actor. He directed a historic-revolutionary film, Romance by Mail, and a melodrama, Deadly Enemy, and played the leading parts in both films; neither picture achieved great success, however. Among the many films Matveyev starred in during that period, perhaps Aleksei Saltykov's The Siberian Woman (Russian: Siberiachka), which garnered him a Best Actor award, and his part in Taming of the Fire, that of a factory director, show him at his best.

In the middle of the 1970s, Yevgeny Matveyev stepped in as a director again. He filmed Earthly Love and Destiny. These pictures have a big success and audience sympathy even these social stories have been polished, which was a necessity of Soviet Era. Matveyev starred as a chairman of collective farm Zakhar Deryugin and Olga Ostroumova was his partner at this time.

Another notable role in the 1970s was a part in Soldiers of Freedom, where he played Leonid Brezhnev, General Secretary of the Communist Party of the Soviet Union. This event affected his career dramatically: he became a secretary of the Cinematographers’ Union of the USSR, and all his films received a "green light". But it affected Matveyev's life very quickly; in the middle of the 1980s, perestroika came, and, with it, came official censure: In 1986, at the Fifth Congress of the Cinematographers' Union, Evgeniy Matveyev was dismissed from his post as secretary, and was punished for his "polished pictures" and his role as Brezhnev.

Undaunted, at the end of the 1980s, Matveyev returned to cinematography, filming a tragic melodrama Vessel of Patience (Russian: Чаша терпения) where he played a leading part, again with Olga Ostroumova as his partner. Vessel of Patience was honored with a Spectator Sympathies Prize at the Constellation / Sozvezdie (Russian: Созвездие) film festival, but the picture remains relatively unknown. Later on, Matveyev took on roles in pictures about criminals, such as The Vacancy of Killer's Place and Clan. In the latter, he re-created Brezhnev once more, but this time in a different context and from a different point of view.

== Later years ==
In 1995, Matveyev directed To Love the Russian Way, soon followed by To Love the Russian Way 2, filmed in 1997 with money sent by his fans from all over Russia. His final work of as director and actor was To Love the Russian Way 3, released in 1999.

He died in Moscow from lung cancer on 1 June 2003, and was interred at Novodevichy Cemetery.

== Awards and honors ==
During his lifetime, among other awards and honors, Yevgeny Matveyev was honored with a USSR State Prize in 1977 and the Vasilyev Brothers State Prize of the RSFSR in 1978, a Dovzhenko Gold Medal for his role in High Title (1974), a Special Prize for the war film Destiny at the 1979 All-Union Film Festival, a best actor award for the role of Yemelyan Pugachev at the 1980 International Film Festival in Prague, and a best actor award for the leading part in To Love the Russian Way at the Tashkent International Film Festival (1997).

Other awards and honors include:

- Two Orders of Lenin (1971, 1982)
- Order of the October Revolution (1986)
- Order "For Merit to the Fatherland":
  - 2nd class (8 March 2002) for outstanding contributions to the development of national cinema
  - 3rd class (6 October 1997) for outstanding contribution to the development of national cinematography
- Honored Artist of the RSFSR (1958)
- People's Artist of the RSFSR (1964)
- People's Artist of the USSR (1974)
- USSR State Prize (1978) for creating feature films Earthy Love and Destiny
- Vasilyev Brothers State Prize of the RSFSR (1974) for creating an image of contemporary films in recent years
- Winner of the All-Union Film Festival in the First Prize of the historical-revolutionary films for 1970
- Winner of the All-Union Film Festival in the Festival Special Prize (1978)
- Winner of the All-Union Film Festival in the Festival Special Prize (1985)
- Honorary Citizen of the Sverdlovsk Oblast

== Filmography ==
=== Actor ===
- To Love the Russian Way 3 (1999) as governor Valerian Petrovich Mukhin
- To Love the Russian Way 2 (1996) as Valerian Petrovich Mukhin
- Good Night (1992) as Pavel Pavlovich
- The Vacancy of Killer's Place (1990) as Knysh
- To Love the Russian Way (1995) as Valerian Petrovich Mukhin
- Fathers (1988) as father-in-law
- The Time of Sons (1986) as Semyon Petrovich Kordin
- Testament (1986) as Ivan Krylov
- Anna and Anton (1985) as Anton
- Der Sieg (1984) as Karpov
- Front in the Rear of the Enemy (1981) as Semirenko
- Particularly Important Task (1979) as Kirillov
- Pugachev (1978) as Yemelyan Pugachev
- Soldiers of Freedom (1977) as Leonid Brezhnev
- Front Beyond the Front Line (1977) as Semirenko
- Destiny (1977) as Zakhar Deriugin
- Earthly Love (1974) as Zakhar Deriugin
- High Title (1973) as Shapavalov
- Taming of the Fire (1972) as factory director
- Romance by Mail (1969) as Ivan Kovshov
- Crash (1968) as Pavlovsky
- The Gypsy (1966) as Budulai
- Fury (1966) as Vasily Gulyavin
- Mother and Stepmother (1964) as Nikolai Vasilyevich Kruglyakov
- Blood Ties (1963) as Fedotov
- Resurrection (1960) as Prince Nekhludov
- Virgin Soil Upturned (1959) as Nagulnov
- The Variegateds Case (1958) as Lobanov
- The Sisters (1958) as Ivan Sorokin
- The House I Live In (1957) as Konstantin Davydov
- Iskateli (1956) as Andrey Nikolaevich Lobanov
- Good Morning (1955) as Sudybinin
- The Road (1955) as Grisha

=== Director ===
- To love Russian Way 3 (1999)
- To love Russian Way 2 (1996)
- To love Russian Way (1989)
- Vessel of Patience (1989)
- The Time of Sons (1986)
- Victory (1985)
- Crazy Money (1981)
- Particularly Important Task (1979)
- Detiny (1977)
- Earthly Love (1974)
- Deadly Enemy (1971)
- Romance by Mail (1969)
- The Gypsy (1966)

=== Screenwriter ===
- Victory (1985)
- Crazy Money (1981)
- Destiny (1977)
- Earthly Love (1974)
- The Gypsy (1966)
