= Valeriya Zaklunna =

Soviet and Ukrainian actress

Hero of Ukraine People's Artist (Ukrainian SSR, Russia) Valeriya Zaklunna-Myronenko
- Валерія Заклунна-Мироненко
- Zaklunna in 2013
- Born: Valeriya Gavriilovna Zaklunna; 15 August 1942; Stalingrad, Stalingrad Oblast Russian SFSR, Soviet Union
- Died: 22 October 2016 (aged 74); Kyiv, Ukraine
- Occupation: Actress
- Years active: 1966–2016
- Awards: Hero of Ukraine; Shevchenko National Prize

Valeriya Gavriilovna Zaklunna-Myronenko (Ukrainian: Вале́рія Гавриїлівна Заклу́нна-Мироненко, Russian: Вале́рия Гаврии́ловна Заклу́нная; 15 August 1942 – 22 October 2016) was a Soviet and Ukrainian actress and politician. A member of the Communist Party of Ukraine, she was a co-winner, with other members of the cast of the film To The Last Minute, of the 1975 Shevchenko National Prize.

== Awards ==
- People's Artist of the Ukrainian SSR (1979)
- People's Artist of Russia (22 May 2004).
- USSR State Prize (1979)
- Hero of Ukraine (2012)
