= They Were Actors =

- Russian: Они были актёрами
- Directed by: Georgy Natanson
- Written by: Georgy Natanson; Viktor Orlov
- Starring: Zinaida Kirienko; Igor Ledogorov; Aleksandr Fatyushin; Zhanna Prokhorenko; Vladimir Druzhnikov
- Cinematography: Anatoli Nikolayev
- Music by: Venyamin Basner
- Release date: 1981
- Running time: 93 minute
- Country: Soviet Union
- Language: Russian

They Were Actors (Russian: Они были актёрами) is a 1981 Soviet adventure film directed by Georgy Natanson.

== Plot ==
The film takes place during the years of the occupation of Crimea by the Nazis. The film tells about a group of actors of the Simferopol Theater and their underground activities.

== Cast ==
- Zinaida Kirienko
- Igor Ledogorov
- Aleksandr Fatyushin
- Zhanna Prokhorenko
- Vladimir Druzhnikov
- Nikolay Volkov
- Yelizaveta Sergeyeva
- Lyudmila Stoyanova
- Aristarkh Livanov
- Vladimir Zaytsev
