= Yuri Levitin =

Yuri Abramoviсh Levitin (Yuriy, Youri; Levitine) (Russian: Юрий Абра́мович Левитин; 28 December [O.S. 15 December] 1912 in Poltava – 26 July 1993 in Moscow) was a Soviet Russian composer of classical music.

== Early life ==
Levitin was born in Poltava. In 1935 he finished his studies at Leningrad Conservatory. In 1937, he completed his postgraduate studies in piano. He finished conservatory with composition classes under Dmitri Shostakovich.

He worked as a pianist in the Leningrad State stage and the Leningrad Philharmonic Society (1931-1941). After this he managed the musical portion of the theater in Tashkent (1941-1942). From 1942 he lived and worked in Moscow.

== Compositions ==
His output includes four operas; seven cantatas; two symphonies; concertos for orchestra, and for solo instruments and orchestra including trumpet, clarinet, cello, oboe and horn; chamber- instrument ensembles, including about a dozen string quartets; many songs; and music for films.
