= Honored Artist of the RSFSR =

Honorary title granted to Soviet performing artists

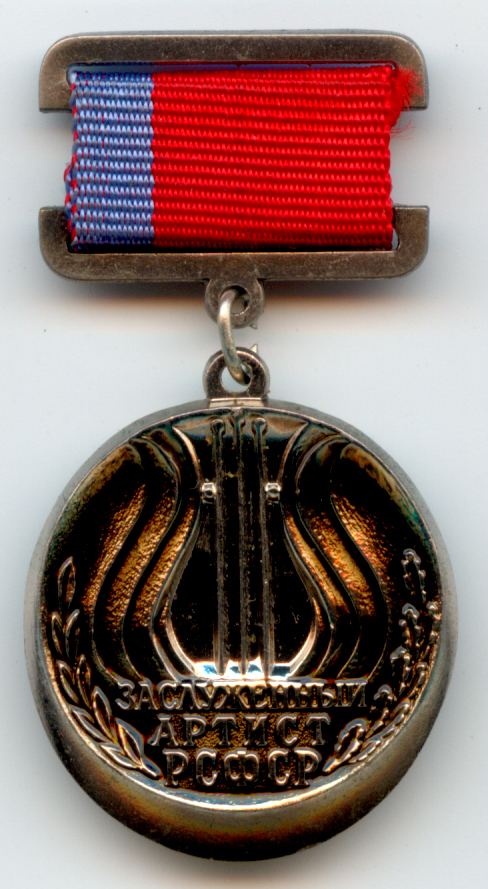
Honored Artist of the RSFSR medal

Honored Artist of the RSFSR (Russian: Заслуженный артист РСФСР, Zasluzhenny artist RSFSR) was an honorary title granted to Soviet artists, including theatre and film directors, choreographers, music performers, and orchestra conductors, who had outstanding achievements in the arts, and who lived in the Russian Soviet Federative Socialist Republic (RSFSR) from 1931 to 1991.

== History ==
From 1919 until the decree from 1931, it was awarded the title "Honored Artist of the Republic". It was assigned by the collegia of the People's Commissariat of Education of the republics, by the order issued by the People's Commissars of Education, by the executive committees of regional councils.

From 1931 to May 1992, the title "Honored Artist of the RSFSR" was awarded to artists, directors, composers, instrumentalists, circus and colloquial performers, famous performers of classical, pop and jazz music from the RSFSR and the union republics, as well as dozens of other famous creative figures of Russia in the field of cinema, music and other spheres of culture (see the list of Honored Artists of the RSFSR).

The next degree of recognition was the awarding of the title "People's Artist of the RSFSR", then "People's Artist of the USSR".

Since 16 May 1992, all documents refer to the title as "Merited Artist of the Russian Federation". The badge has undergone some changes: the inscription "RSFSR" was removed and instead of the RSFSR flag of 1954, there was a tricolor on the moire ribbon. On the eve of 1996, the decree of the President of the Russian Federation No. 1341 was issued, after which new signs were developed.

== Description ==
The badge is made of gilded tombac and has the shape of an oval measuring 28.7 x 43 mm with an eyelet. In the central part of the badge there is an image of a lyre and below the inscription "Honored Artist of the RSFSR" with laurel and oak branches along the edges. All images and inscriptions are convex and filled with colorless, transparent enamel. The badge with the help of an eyelet and a link is connected to a gilded rectangular shoe measuring 15 mm by 25 mm. The shoe is entwined with a moire ribbon with the red and light blue colors of the RSFSR flag. The shoe has a pin on the back for attaching the sign to clothing. Attached to the badge is the Diploma of the Presidium of the Supreme Soviet of the RSFSR.

== See also ==
- Merited Artist of the Russian Federation
