= Ballad of Childhood =

1975 song by Vladimir Vysotsky

Song by Vladimir Vysotsky

from the album Tight rope
- Language: Russian
- Released: 1975
- Recorded: 1977
- Genre: Bard
- Label: Polydor Records
- Songwriter: Vladimir Vysotsky

Ballad of Childhood (Russian: Баллада о детстве; "I don't remember the conception hour quite well...") is an autobiographical song by Vladimir Vysotsky, written in 1975 for the play Look Back, While Leaving by Eduard Volodarsky. Author's variations of the title: Ballad of Childhood or Ballad of the Old House, Ballad of Childhood or Old House, Ballad of My Childhood, Ballad of My Old House, My Childhood, Ballad of the Old House, Ballad of the Old House, or Ballad of My Childhood.

The work reflects the author's real life impressions, recreates recognizable signs of the time. Almost all the characters of the ballad are brought out under their real names and surnames. Song fragments (under the title Song about times long gone by) are heard in the feature film The Second Attempt of Viktor Krokhin. During Vysotsky's lifetime, the ballad was recorded by him on the record La corde raide (Polydor, France, fall 1977) and published in 1978 in Paris in the collection Songs of Russian bards by YMCA-Press. In the Soviet Union, the text of the work was first published in 1987 (Aurora magazine, No. 8).

== Song’s history ==
According to Stanislav Govorukhin and the Vainer brothers, Vladimir Vysotsky wrote the Ballad of Childhood in one day, in the margins of the Soviet Screen magazine. Work on the text began on the flight to Odessa and continued in the director's dacha. In the evening, the author offered his friends to listen to the new song. Later, at concerts, Vladimir Semyonovich presented it to the audience as "little sketches from childhood": "It's about my old house on First Meshchanskaya Street, where I lived as a child".

As the poet claimed in his speeches, the song was written specifically for Eduard Volodarsky's play Look Back, While Leaving. The play premiered at the Moscow Art Theater on April 14, 1976 (directed by Oleg Yefremov and produced by Yevgeny Radomyslensky); it was subsequently performed in other theaters throughout the country.

Thematically, the song is also close to the plot of the movie Viktor Krokhin's Second Attempt about post-war realities. Scriptwriter Eduard Volodarsky said that it could have been organically included in the context of the tape, but Vysotsky flatly refused to censor cuts of "the conception hour...”. Therefore, the first version of the film, shot in 1977 at Lenfilm, did not include the song. Researcher of Vysotsky's work, Mark Tsybulsky publicized the conclusion of the script-editorial board, which decided in August of the same year the fate of Victor Krokhin destiny. Among other claims the document pointed out that the creators of the tape “should once again check the appropriateness of the use of V. Vysotsky's song”. The film itself was banned immediately after its release and was not released until ten years later; the restored version features fragments of Ballad...

Vysotsky offered to perform Ballad of Childhood in the film the Meeting Place Cannot Be Changed, but this initiative was not supported by the film's director Stanislav Govorukhin, who believed that such interference in the script would destroy the audience's trust in the image of Zheglov: "It will no longer be Captain Zheglov, but Vysotsky as Captain Zheglov".

== First editions, performances, recordings ==
The first public performance of the song was recorded in October 1975. The poem was published during the poet's lifetime in 1978 in Paris in the fourth volume of the collection Songs of Russian Bards, and in the fall of the same year the song was released in France on the record La corde raide under the title "La ballade de l'enfance". The songs on this album are characterized by orchestral arrangements by Konstantin Kazanski.

In the USSR, the poem Ballad of Childhood was first officially published in the 8th issue of the magazine Aurora in 1987. The Melodiya company released the song in 1990 on a record of the same name (the fourteenth in the series On Vladimir Vysotsky's Concerts, M60 49415 001), recorded in 1977. The last known public performance of the song by the author took place on July 16, 1980.

== Autobiographical motifs ==
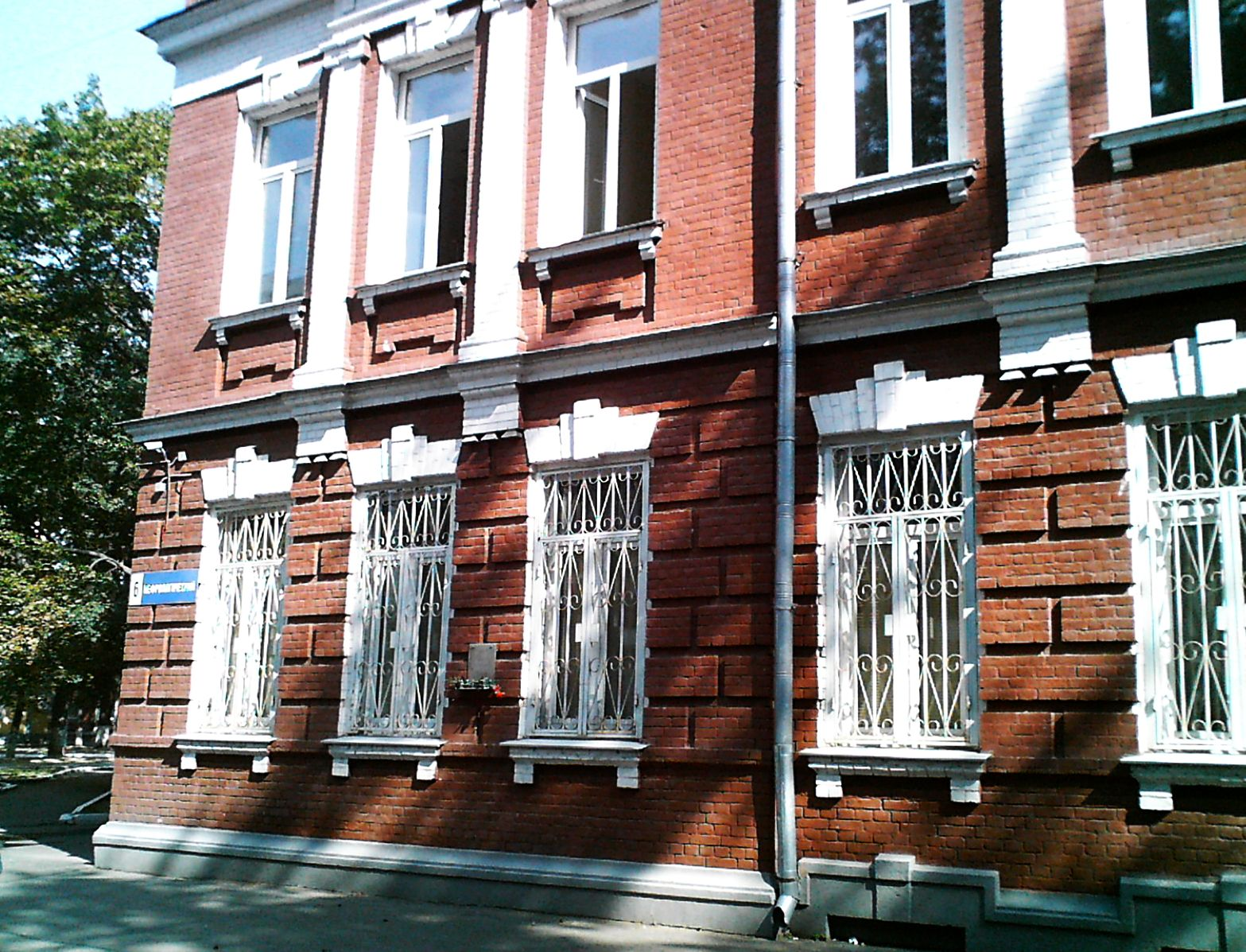
Vysotsky was born in this maternity hospital on Third Meshchanskaya Street

The Ballad of Childhood is full of details that allow us to speak about the autobiographical character of the work. The narrative begins not with the traditional story about the day of birth, but with the "hour of conception" — this artistic device literary scientist Vladimir Novikov called "grim grotesque".

Then the poet uses the year of birth: "The first time I got freedom // By the decree of the thirty-eighth". Researchers interpret these lines in different ways: for example, literary historian Pavel Fokin, in his commentary to the collection of Vysotsky's works, gives a reference to the decree of the Supreme Soviet of the USSR on amnesty for servicemen, which was issued on the eve of Vladimir Semyonovich's birth. According to publicist Vladimir Bondarenko, the song refers to another document — the decree of the Supreme Soviet on the prohibition of abortion in the USSR. Vladimir Novikov disagrees with these versions and believes that certain legal acts have nothing to do with Ballad...: "What he wanted to say here is much simpler and at the same time deeper. Life is freedom in comparison with non-existence". The literary scientist Anatoly Kulaguin notes that by mentioning the "first term" spent in the mother's womb, the author of the song deliberately correlates with the history of the country and the time when "huge terms were shaved into long stages".

Among the topographical elements of the Ballad... stands out "the house on the First Meshchanskaya Street — at the end", where there was a large communal apartment where Vysotsky spent his childhood years. As Vysotsky's neighbor Vartan Ter-Minosyan recalled, in the pre-revolutionary period the house No. 126 on the First Meshchanskaya Street (now 76, Mira Prospect) belonged to the Abrikosov merchants, who rented "furnished rooms 'Natalis'". The "corridor system" described by Vladimir Semyonovich really existed there; however, the song mentions "thirty-eight rooms", while in fact there were thirty-seven. The Vysotskys lived in room 35.

Vysotsky, describing his own reality, introduces the reader/listener to a private history, but his creative task is much broader than demonstrating the experience of his own Soviet childhood. This experience is transformed into a large-scale historical and geographical reflection, revealing at the same time the generational experience of his generation.

== Signs of time ==
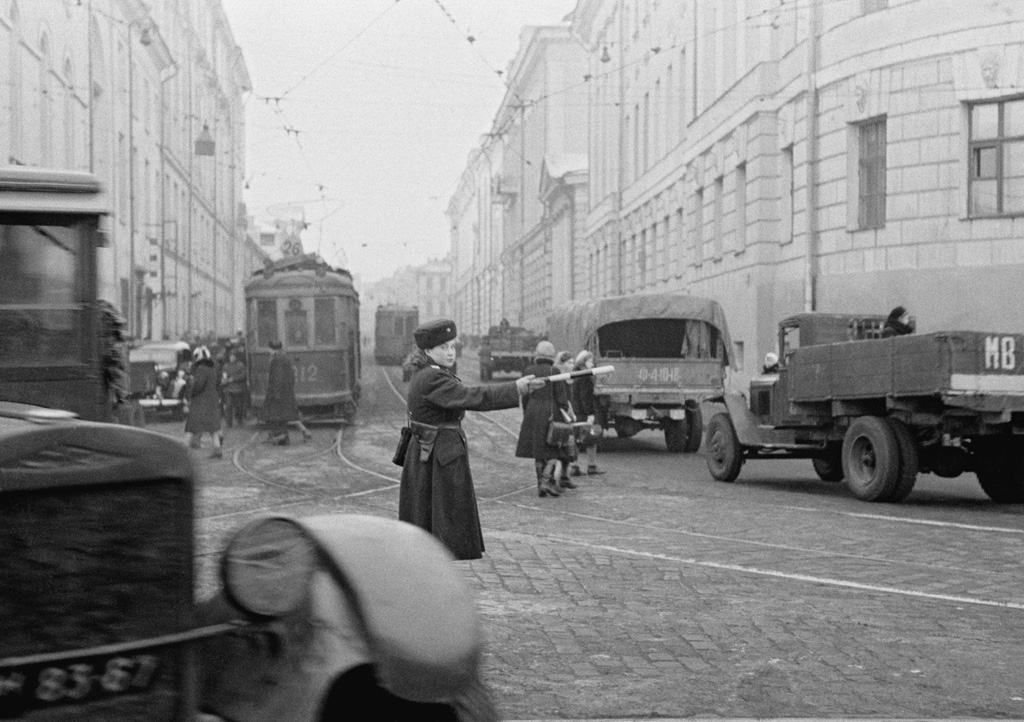
Post-war Moscow

The communal fraternity, the essence of which is articulated in the dialogue between the neighbor Yevdokim Kirillovich and his neighbor Gisya Moiseevna ("Oh, Gisya, we are a family: // You are all victims, too!"), was conditioned by common trials and shared experiences of loss: "Mine (relatives) were killed without news, // Yours (relatives) were innocently imprisoned".

The author's childhood impressions are humble life, eternal cold, German incendiary bombs ("And the people put out the 'incendiaries'!"), post-war disintegration of families (the lines "Our fathers and brothers // returned home — to their own and foreign homes!" refer, among others, to Vysotsky's family). Not far from the 126th house, according to Nina Maximovna Vysotskaya, POWs were working, and her son willingly communicated with them: "They were doing exchange business // Snotty ostrozhniki". Vladimir Akimov, a classmate of Vysotskaya's, stated that in exchange for bread, one could get not only the knives mentioned in the song, but also other things valued in adolescence: a lighter, a wheel made of coins.

The Moscow panorama of the second half of the 1940s also includes brief sketches that, in the words of the literary scholar Igor Sukhikh, create "a non-parade image of the end of the war: "The country of Limonia (Note: Researchers propose different versions of the appearance of the Land of Limonia in Vysotsky's lyrics. For example, Anatoly Kulagin and Andrei Skobelev believe that the song contains a reference to the poem The Land of Limonia by the poet Anatoly Zhigulin, in which the image of a fairy-tale and festive planet is created. Vysotskologists remind us that in the criminal world Limonia is an ironic name for a not so remote place, "the Urkagan definition of prison camp life". Pavel Fokin, in his commentary on the text, suggests that Limonia may be a "fictitious toponym" reminiscent of exotic countries in general and Vertinsky's "banana-lemon Singapore" in particular. According to Leyla Abdullaeva, the appearance of fairy-tale Limonia next to real countries brings the image of the postwar world created by Vysotsky to the mythological level.) has come!" From the exchange cases and knives that the students of the craft schools made from files, sometimes a new stage of life began, recorded in words that, according to Andrei Skobelev, "have almost a final meaning: "And so the romantics left the square as thieves".

Actually, this "house at the end of First Meshchanskaya Street", where the hero was born, lived and survived, is a sign of the time, "when the periods were long, we moved in long stages", and the multiethnic inhabitants were united by a common misfortune — war and repression... Such a combination of rough (in Russian blatnaya) and military themes and here creates a special, harsh and cruel flavor of the era.

== Characters ==
Among all the characters in Ballad..., the narrator stands out. On the one hand, he speaks about himself. On the other hand, he speaks on behalf of his characters, among whom there are practically no fictitious ones: almost all the inhabitants of the 126th house (except for Marusya Peresvetova, who bore the surname Trisvetova) are presented under their real names. According to Mikhail Yakovlev, Gisi Moiseyevna's son, these people were so colorful that a great story could be written about each of them. Gizi Moiseyevna's family lived across the wall from Vysotsky's room. As Vladimir Semyonovich's mother recalled, in January 1938 a postcard from the Yakovlevs arrived at the maternity hospital where the future author of Ballad... was born: "All the neighborhoud congratulate you on the birth of a new citizen of the USSR! And all together we decided to call him Oleg!" At a certain point, the Yakovlevs and the Vysotskys even reconstructed the wall that separated them, opening the double door that had been installed in the days of the Abrikosov merchants (after the revolution it was boarded up and mortgaged) and thus creating a common space.

The fates of the balladeers were different. Gisya Moiseyevna Yakovleva's regular interlocutor, Evdokim Kirillovich Usachev, did not return from the war. Gisya Moiseyevna herself raised her son Mikhail and caught the time of Vladimir Semyonovich's acting debut. According to his first wife Iza Konstantinovna, when they met in 1976, he said that the nearest neighbor from the old house on the First Meshchanskaya was no longer alive, but "he would be glad that Vysotsky managed to sing about her". One of the heroines of the work, Zinaida Kuznetsova, in an interview with journalists in 1997 admitted that the Ballad... tells not only about her ("Aunt Zina has a blouse with dragons and snakes!"), but also about her father, a metro construction worker. In the last months of his life, Vysotsky often reminisced about the post-war years and turned to his comrade — the actor and chief administrator of the Taganka Theater Valery Yanklovich with a proposal to go to the First Meshchanskaya.

== In memoir-poetry context ==
Researchers note that not only Vysotsky, but also other Russian poets often turned to their childhood and youth memories when they became adults. These "preliminary results" are necessary for them to correlate the passed path of life "with some higher plan — a vocation". Thus, in 1830, Alexander Pushkin wrote the poem "At the beginning of life I remember school". Mikhail Lermontov turned to understanding the "paradoxes of generations", confessing in Thought: "And a secret cold reigns in the soul // When the fire boils in the blood". Alexander Blok worked for several years on the poem Retribution, whose epigraph was the line of the playwright Henrik Ibsen "Youth is retribution". The same Blok wrote in his poem Born in the Deaf Years "We are children of the terrible years of Russia" — this modified line was reproduced by Vysotsky in one of his later songs: "We too are children of the terrible years of Russia, // Timelessness poured vodka into us".

According to literary scholar Anatoly Kulaguin, the paradoxes of Vysotsky's generation reproduced in Ballad of Childhood consist in the fact that "the romantic spiritual thrust to the heights inherent in youth turned into a plunge to the social 'bottom' in the criminalized postwar country," and romance was colored in blatant and criminal tones: "First they played with the 'wrappers', // In the hallway with the greedy ones'. (Note: Wrappers was a children's game that became popular in the post-war period: two players take turns throwing coins or folded wrappers against the wall. If the distance between the bouncing objects can be measured with the fingers of one hand, the second player wins; if not, the first wins.) - // And now the romantics have gone // From the underpasses as thieves". This poetic theme is developed and leads to a paradoxical and ambiguous finale, according to Vysotskologists: "There was a time when there were cellars, // When there were real deals, and prices could be lower, (Note: Between 1947 and 1952, there were frequent price reductions set by the government.) // And canals flowed where they should, // And in the end where they should fall. (Note: "Canals": during Stalin's leadership of the country, mostly by the hands of prisoners, the White Sea-Baltic Canal, the Moscow Canal, and the Volga-Don Canal were built.) // Children of ex-majors and majors // went up to the ice latitudes, (Note: “Up to the ice latitudes have risen“-here-”found themselves in the northern camps.) // because it seemed easier for them to go down from those corridors". А. Nazarov believes that in the criminal destiny of Vysotsky's generation he describes the movement "upwards", not "to the pioneers, Komsomol or party bureaucrats", but to the social "bottom", in fact there is a break in the "circular bond of fear and meanness". Andrei Skobelev calls it "a conflict between the 'top' and the 'bottom,'" while Kulagin sees a connection with the lines of Vysotsky's poem My Hamlet: "The weight of heavy thoughts drew me up, / And the wings of flesh dragged me down, to the grave." In his opinion, the "Hamlet paradox" is organically woven by Vysotsky into the Ballad of Childhood, and the allegories accurately describe the destiny of the post-war "fraternity", "honest society", described by the hero of the Ballad of Childhood".

== Artistic characteristics ==
According to literary scholar Anatoly Kulaguin, Vysotsky had never written this way before; the characters of his songs are usually distant from the author, and the songs have a narrative beginning. By contrast, in Ballad of Childhood there is no specific story, no story about a single event. The work describes numerous disparate events; in the words of E. Kanchukov, the "cellular" structure of the song "resembles a communal apartment, when the plot is assembled from closed block rooms".

The song begins in the first person, but in the course of the narrative the hero-narrator gradually shifts from the word "I" to "we"; eventually it becomes dominant. This observation applies not only to the Ballad of Childhood, but also to Vysotsky's other works: like many of his contemporaries who grew up in a communal environment, the "sense of elbow" is very important to him: "His strong man becomes himself only when he feels that he belongs to the whole". The literary scholar Bartosz Osiewicz uses the term "lyroepic ballad" to define the genre chosen by the author. According to him, such a form was optimal for the actor, musician and poet to convey his thoughts to the listener. In "Vysotsky's Song Theatre" there are no detailed descriptions of the actors: the characters and fates of the heroes are revealed through their short lines or the author's brief remarks, which reproduce certain events of their biographies.

Among the artistic characteristics inherent in the "Ballad..." is a certain "shift of verisimilitude", thanks to which the song introduces a motif associated with the "sacred power of a generation" and its heroization. Through the "mystifying narrative," the military theme is intertwined with criminal romance.

The poet not only "heard" the epoch, but also "saw" it. <...> At times, these "audio" and "video" details recall folkloric, fairy-tale images. Thus, the country of Limonia neighbors the real "trophies" of Japan and Germany, raising this —trophy— side of postwar life to an almost mythological level.

In his analysis of the song's text, Igor Sukhikh draws attention to the "semantic games" for which Vysotsky has a particular fondness. For example, the neighborhood subway builder's explanation of his chosen profession ("Corridors end in a wall, / And tunnels lead to the light") contains a double meaning: "wall" is not only a partition in space, but also a synonym for shooting. The song also contains obvious references to literary works by other authors. For example, the lines "Those times were secluded, / Now they are almost bylinnye" lead to Vladimir Mayakovsky: "There were times — gone bylinnye". Researchers compare the "Limonia land" mentioned in the text of the ballad with the harsh northern territory of Anatoly Zhigulin's poem of the same name. According to Dmitry Bykov, Ballad of Childhood is characterized by "photographic accuracy of details": "The synthesis of the public and the private, the Soviet and the private, the role-playing and the confessional is somehow achieved here; and the real voice of Vysotsky is heard here".

== See also ==
- Smoke-free bathhouse

== Bibliography ==
- Vysotsky, V. (1993). Сочинения. В 2 томах [Work. In 2 volumes.] (in Russian). Vol. 1. М.: Художественная литература. p. 639. ISBN 5-280-02943-2.
- Vysotsky, V. (1996). Собрание сочинений в пяти томах [Works Collection in Five Volumes] (in Russian). Vol. 3. Песни и стихи. 1973—1975. Тула: Тулица. p. 408. ISBN 5-86152-005-4.
- Vysotsky, V. S. (2012). Каюсь! Каюсь! Каюсь! [My repentance! My repentance! My repentance!] (in Russian). СПб.: Амфора. ISBN 978-5-367-02117-2.
- Kulaguin, A. V. (2016). Беседы о Высоцком [Conversations about Vysotsky] (in Russian). Издательские решения. p. 164. ISBN 978-5-4474-8196-4.
- Krylov, A. E., Kulaguin, A. V. (2010). Высоцкий как энциклопедия советской жизни: Комментарий к песням поэта [Vysotsky as an encyclopedia of Soviet life: Commentary on the poet's songs] (in Russian). М.: Булат. p. 384. ISBN 978-5-91457-008-5.
- Kulaguin, A. (2013). Поэзия Высоцкого: Творческая эволюция [Vysotsky's Poetry: Artistic Evolution] (in Russian). Воронеж: Эхо. p. 230.
- Novikov, V. (2013). Высоцкий [Vysotsky]. Жизнь замечательных людей (in Russian). М.: Молодая гвардия. p. 492. ISBN 978-5-235-03554-6.
- Perevozchikov, V. (2005). Неизвестный Высоцкий [Unknown Vysotsky] (in Russian). М.: Вагриус. p. 21. ISBN 5-9697-0014-2.
- Skobelev, A. V. (2012). Много неясного в странной стране… III. Материалы к комментированию избранных произведений В. С. Высоцкого [Many uncertainties in a strange country... III. Materials for commenting on the selected works of V. S. Vysotsky]. Литературоведение (in Russian). Воронеж: Эхо. p. 310.
- Shaulov, S. V. (2014). Высоцкий: контексты и интертексты [Vysotsky: contexts and intertexts] (in Russian). Уфа: БГПУ. ISBN 978-5-87978-895-2.
