= Under Military Law (TV series) =

- Genre: Drama; War film; Historical drama; Detective film
- Written by: Evgeny Gorislavets; Vasily Popov, Dmitry Lysenko, Alexey Timoshkin
- Starring: Evgeny Volovenko; Ekaterina Klimova; Aleksandr Pankratov-Chyorny; Maxim Drozd
- Composers: Vladimir Kripak; Vladimir Saiko
- Country of origin: Ukraine; Russia
- Original language: Russian
- No. of seasons: 5
- No. of episodes: 44

Production
- Executive producers: Maxim Mekheda (1st and 2nd seasons); Evgeny Serov (3rd season); Sergey Vinogradov (4th and 5th seasons)
- Producers: Artyom Dollezhal; Vladislav Ryashin
- Running time: ≈ 45 – 50 minutes
- Production company: Star Media

Original release
- Network: Ukraina; Channel One
- Release: May 9, 2016 – May 6, 2022

Under Military Law (Russian: По законам военного времени, romanized: Po zakonam voennogo vremeni,Ukrainian: За законами воєнного часу) is a Russian - Ukrainian military - historical detective television series directed by Maxim Mekheda, Yevgeny Serov and Sergey Vinogradov, produced by the Star Media film company.

The premiere of the TV series in Ukraine took place on May 9, 2016, and in Russia on May 4, 2017. On Russian television, the series is broadcast on Channel One.

As of May 6, 2022, a total of five seasons of the television series have been released in Russia, including forty-four episodes.

== Plot ==
The plot is based on the work of employees of the Soviet military prosecutor's office and investigative agencies during the Great Patriotic War (1941–1945) and after the Victory.

Four main characters are in the center of the story: residents of Kiev, foreman Grigory Fedorenko (whose family died under bombing in the first days of the war), investigator of the Kiev military prosecutor's office Ivan Rokotov (veteran of the First Cavalry Army ), his old acquaintance, assistant to the Chief Military Prosecutor, brig military lawyer from Moscow Nikolai Mirsky and investigator of the Main Military Prosecutor's Office of the Red Army Svetlana Elagina (Mirsky's younger sister).

A group of investigators has been investigating important and complicated cases for several seasons, both on the front lines and in front-line cities.

In the second season, Ivan Rokotov and Svetlana Elagina are united by marriage.

== Cast ==
=== Main cast ===
- Evgeny Volovenko Ivan Grigoryevich Rokotov, investigator of the military prosecutor's office, military lawyer of the 2nd rank, major of justice; prosecutor of the Königsberg region (1945–1946)
- Ekaterina Klimova Svetlana Petrovna Elagina, investigator for especially important cases of the Main Military Prosecutor's Office, military lawyer, major (in the 4th season - captain) of justice, prosecutor of the city of Königsberg (in the 5th season)
- Aleksandr Pankratov-Chyorny Grigory Ivanovich Fedorenko, driver Rokotov, foreman / junior lieutenant of the MGB of the USSR
- Maxim Drozd Nikolai Trofimovich Mirsky, assistant to the Chief Military Prosecutor of the Red Army, brig military officer (seasons 1–2), went missing in battles near Kharkov (1942)

=== Cast (Season 1) ===
- Victoria Malektorovich Olga Vladimirovna Sidorenko Secretary of the secret commission under the Politburo of the Central Committee of the All-Union Communist Party of Bolsheviks
- Viktor Saraikin Semyon Georgievich Fedin military prosecutor of the Kiev garrison
- Sergey Romanyuk Pyotr Matveyevich Tomenko Senior Major of State Security
- Vladimir Goryansky Lozinsky major of state security
- Evgeny Efremov Khalimov investigator of the Kiev NKVD
- Dmitry Surzhikov Denis Mikhailovich Shmelev captain of state security (inspector from Moscow)
- Alexander Kobzar Aleksandr Petrovich Sergeev Investigator of the Prosecutor's Office
- Inna Belikova Zinaida Fedina's secretary (worker of the prosecutor's office)
- Igor Portyanko Bogdanenko Head of the Kiev Criminal Investigation Department (Police Major)
- Andrey Saminin Dergachov senior lieutenant, then police captain
- Alexandra Sizonenko Vorobushkina police sergeant
- David Babaev Solomon Yakovlevich Rokotov's neighbor
- Sofia Pisman Bella Rokotov's neighbor, Solomon's wife
- Daria Botsmanova Nyusya Ozhogina, daughter of Rokotov's deceased friend
- Alexander Kryzhanovsky Yegor Ilyich Moscow chief of Mirsky ( 3rd rank Commissar of State Security )
- Stanislav Moskvin Major of State Security Potapov
- Konstantin Koretsky Lieutenant of State Security Fishman
- Oleg Primogenov Abwehr agent Sidorov leader of a gang of criminals
- Valery Shvets Nikolay Matveyevich Ivanov Kiev criminal
- Alexander Suvorov Ivan Danilovich Kudrya lieutenant of state security (organizer of the Kiev anti-fascist underground)
- Zoryana Marchenko Maria Sergeevna Ostapenko contact Ivan Kudri

=== Cast (Season 2) ===
- Alexey Shutov Alexander Gromov senior lieutenant, childhood friend of Elagina
- Sergei Denga Igor Vyacheslavovich Uvarov Senior Investigator of the Main Military Prosecutor's Office
- Stanislav Boklan Gray-haired criminal authority
- Victoria Litvinenko Olga senior dispatcher of the railway station
- Anatoly Zinovenko Moishe (Mikhail Markovich) Libman Rokotov's neighbor
- Lyudmila Gnilova Esfir Solomonovna Libman mother of Moisha Libman
- Svetlana Zelbet Nina Vasilievna Sablina military lawyer, employee of the Kharkov prosecutor's office
- Andrey Mostrenko Naum Kaminsky
- Sergey Frolov Yakov Mikhailovich Soloveichik, an employee of the Kharkov prosecutor's office
- Mark Drobot Stepan Fedorovich Flyazhnikov 3rd rank military officer, subordinate of Uvarov
- Dmitry Saranskov Aleksey Bereza company commander, captain
- Vladislav Mamchur Michael dispatcher at the station
- Alexander Kryzhanovsky Egor Ilyich, Moscow chief of Mirsky
- Natalia Vasko Nina Timofeevna Guseva museum employee

=== Cast (Season 3) ===
- Dmitry Sutyrin Viktor Sergeevich Zvyaginov SMERSH captain, head of the investigation team
- Yuri Vaksman Yakov Iosifovich Blank, member of the Odessa City Party Committee
- Dmitry Kravchenko Nikolai Stepanov policeman in Odessa, captain
- Alexandra Sizonenko Junior Lieutenant Vorobushkina police officer
- Ksenia Shcherbakova Anastasia Zimina counterintelligence officer of the Black Sea Fleet, captain-lieutenant
- Sergei Bachursky Valentin Alexandrovich Strong head of the encryption service
- Anna Glaube Sofia Stavradi cipher at headquarters
- Konstantin Beloshapka Grigory Mavrodaki fiancé Sofia
- Yanina Kolesnichenko Athena Feodorovna Satyras mother of Dorik, aunt of Sofia Stavradi
- Zakhar Ronzhin Dorius (Dorik) Satyras son of Athena
- Ivan Shmakov San Sanych Gorenko homeless child
- Anatoly Gushchin Mikhail Znamensky, a war invalid, husband of the housekeeper of the city military commissar Lidia
- Ivan Shibanov Arkady Glebovich Tikhonovich First Secretary of the Odessa City Party Committee
- Alexander Userdin Pavel Malyshev Tikhonovich's assistant
- Maxim Litovchenko Lev Nikolaevich Avdeev, head of the Odessa counterintelligence department of the Black Sea Fleet
- Yuri Gorbach Gorshkov, employee of the encryption department
- Oleg Chevelev Jonah German saboteur

=== Cast (Season 4) ===
- Anatoly Kot Heinrich von Berg, Oberst Lieutenant (in active reserve), owner of a rich mansion in the German town of Insterburg (near Königsberg )
- Alexander Peskov Vitaly Sergeevich Dremov major, SMERSH officer of the army
- Anton Morozov Buynosov, Major of the Guards, commandant of the German city of Insterburg (near Königsberg) (series No. 1-2)
- Alexander Dudenkov Alexander Vasilyevich Dudenkov, senior lieutenant, acting commandant of the German city of Insterburg (near Königsberg), veterinarian
- Peter Chernyaev Knopf, German, neighbor of the murdered German Krankel family, former local government official
- Andrey Arzyaev Karnaukhov, a soldier of the Red Army, being treated in a Soviet hospital in Insterburg
- Kirill Krasnov Grinko, a soldier of the Red Army, being treated in a Soviet hospital in Insterburg

== Episodes ==
| Season | Episodes | Originally released | | War period and location |
| Season | Episodes | First released | Last released | War period and location |
|---|---|---|---|---|
| 1 | 12 | May 9, 2016 | May 13, 2016 | Summer 1941, surrounded by Kiev |
| 2 | 8 | May 5, 2018 | May 8, 2018 | October 1941, front-line Kharkov |
| 3 | 8 | May 5, 2019 | May 8, 2019 | 1944, liberated Odessa |
| 4 | 8 | April 26, 2021 | May 3, 2021 | May 1945, conquered Insterburg |
| 5 | 8 | May 2, 2022 | June 6, 2022 | Autumn 1945, Soviet Königsberg (Kaliningrad) |
