= The Sixth (1981 film) =

1981 film

- Film poster
- Directed by: Samvel Gasparov
- Starring: Sergei Nikonenko; Vladimir Grammatikov; Mikhail Pugovkin
- Production company: Gorky Film Studio
- Release date: 1981
- Running time: 83 minutes
- Country: Soviet Union
- Language: Russian

The Sixth (Russian: «Шестой», romanized: Shestoy) is a 1981 Soviet action film directed by Samvel Gasparov at Gorky Film Studio.

== Plot ==
The Sixth is a parable about lawlessness and bureaucracy in the aftermath of the Great October Revolution. The film could be categorized as an "Ostern" type of movie, with a lawman hero who faces up to corruption against the odds, although no one around has any faith in his abilities.

It is set in 1923 and the Russian Civil War has come to an end, although the situation is still dangerous in some regions. An elusive band of White guards is hiding in the mountains, raiding Soviet institutions and making short work of the representatives of local government. Five chiefs have already been killed by the "whites" and the intimidated townsfolk believe the sixth one is also doomed. The protagonist is the sixth militia chief, but he is shrewder than his predecessors.

Recognizing the superior firepower of his well-armed and zealous enemies, he attempts to mobilise the people in the towns and help them regain faith and hope. He learns that there is a leak in his organisation and that someone is informing the band of all planned operations. He decides to use this very leak against the bandits.

== Cast ==
- Sergei Nikonenko - Roman Glodov
- Vladimir Grammatikov - Pavlik
- Mikhail Pugovkin - Mironych
- Evgeny Bakalov - Aristarkh Lushkov
- Timothy Spivak - Alexander
- Sergey Ulyanov - Nikita
- Maharbeg Kokoev - Ohrim
