= Viktor Yartsev =

Soviet politician

Victor Vladimirovich Yartsev
- Виктор Владимирович Ярцев
- Viktor Yartsev
- Born: 1904; Moscow, Russian Empire
- Died: January 28, 1940 (aged 35–36); Moscow, Soviet Union
- Military career
- Allegiance: Russian Empire; Russian Soviet Federative Socialist Republic; Soviet Union
- Branch: Workers' and Peasants' Red Army; United State Political Administration; People's Commissariat of Internal Affairs
- Service years: 1920–1921, 1930–1938
- Rank: Major of State Security
- Awards: Order of Lenin

Viktor Vladimirovich Yartsev (Russian: Ви́ктор Влади́мирович Я́рцев; 1904, Moscow, Russian Empire – 1940, Moscow, Soviet Union) was the Head of the Department of Water Transport, Highways and Communications (11th Department) of the People's Commissariat of Internal Affairs of the Soviet Union, then First Deputy People's Commissar of Communications of the Soviet Union, Major of State Security (1937).

== Biography ==
In 1918–1919, he was an apprentice in a hairdressing salon, in 1919–1920, he was an assistant locksmith in auto repair shops. In May 1920, he entered the Workers' and Peasants' Red Army and in the same year joined the Russian Communist Party (Bolsheviks). In May–September 1921, he was an instructor of the Moscow Committee of the Russian Communist Youth Union; from October 1922, he worked at the Mosselprom trust, then at Soyuzselprom.

In February 1930, he joined the United State Political Administration. From March 1930, assistant commissioner, from June 1, 1930, commissioner, from October 1, 1931, operational commissioner of the Economic Directorate of the United State Political Administration. From October 1, 1933, Assistant Chief of the First Department of the Economic Directorate of the United State Political Directorate (Main Directorate of State Security of the People's Commissariat of Internal Affairs of the Soviet Union). From May 3, 1935, Head of the Second Branch of the Economic Department of the Main Directorate of State Security of the People's Commissariat of Internal Affairs of the Soviet Union. Since November 1936, Head of the First Section (Third) of the Counterintelligence Department of the Main Directorate of State Security of the People's Commissariat of Internal Affairs of the Soviet Union.

One of the closest associates of Nikolai Yezhov, took an active part in the repressions against both the commanding staff of the Workers' and Peasants' Red Army, and against economic assets (primarily at the enterprises of communications). From July 11, 1937, the Head of the Eleventh Department of the Main Directorate of State Security of the People's Commissariat of Internal Affairs of the Soviet Union, in charge of water and road transport, as well as communications. On April 2, 1938, he was sent to Sakhalin with the rank of government commissar. He began mass arrests among the party and economic activists of the island. On July 11, 1938, he was in a plane crash and was wounded.

On November 16, 1938, he was appointed First Deputy People's Commissar of Communications of the Soviet Union. In 1939–1941, he was a candidate member of the Central Committee of the All–Union Communist Party (Bolsheviks), but in June 1939, he was arrested. Sentenced on January 28, 1940, by the Military Collegium of the Supreme Court of the Soviet Union to death. Shot on the day of sentencing.

=== Education ===
- From September 1921 to October 1922, he studied at the Military School Named After the All–Russian Central Executive Committee;
- Until 1926, he was a student of the working faculty (completed 2 courses);
- In 1930, he graduated from the Moscow Electrotechnical Institute of Communications.

=== Ranks ===
- December 11, 1935 – Senior Lieutenant of State Security;
- December 20, 1936 – Captain of State Security;
- June 27, 1937 – Major of State Security.

=== Awards ===
- May 5, 1937 – Order of Lenin.

== Sources ==
- Nikita Petrov, Konstantin Skorkin. "Who Led the People's Commissariat of Internal Affairs, 1934–1941". Directory. Zvenya Publishing House, 1999, ISBN 5-7870-0032-3
