= Black Hunters =

- Directed by: Andrey Malyukov
- Written by: Kirill Belevich; Aleksandr Shevtsov; Eduard Volodarsky
- Produced by: Sergey Shumakov
- Starring: Danila Kozlovsky; Andrey Terentyev; Vladimir Yaglych; Dmitriy Volkostrelov; Ekaterina Klimova
- Cinematography: Vladimir Sporyshkov
- Edited by: Mariya Sergeenkova
- Music by: Ivan Burlyaev
- Production company: A-1 Kino Video
- Distributed by: Karoprokat; Nashe Kino
- Release date: February 21, 2008
- Running time: 120 minutes
- Country: Russia
- Language: Russian
- Budget: $5 million
- Box office: $8,043,992

Black Hunters (original title, Russian: Мы из будущего, romanized: My iz budushchego, lit. 'We're from the future') is a 2008 Russian language action drama film directed by Andrey Malyukov.

In 2010 its sequel was released.

== Plot ==
Four treasure seekers in the present day dig near St. Petersburg in search of hidden medals and artifacts of soldiers who fought during World War II. The chief of the group, Borman (Danila Kozlovsky), is a former student of the Faculty of History Sergei Filatov. His assistant is a Rastafarian nicknamed Spirit (Andrei Terentyev). Two other members are Chuhat (Dmitry Volkostrelov) and Skull (Vladimir Yaglych). Skull is a neo-Nazi and has a stylized tattoo of the swastika on his shoulder.

When they go for a dive in a lake, they accidentally time travel to the Eastern Front in 1942.

== Cast ==
- Danila Kozlovsky as Borman
- Andrey Terentyev as Spirt
- Vladimir Yaglych as Cherep
- Dmitriy Volkostrelov as Chukha
- Ekaterina Klimova as Nina
- Boris Galkin as Emelyanov
- Daniil Strakhov as Demin
- Sergey Makhovikov as Karpenko

== Awards ==
Award	Category	Nominee	Result
MTV Russia Movie Awards, 2009	Best Fight		Won
MTV Russia Movie Awards, 2009	Best Film		Nominated
MTV Russia Movie Awards, 2009	Best Actress	Ekaterina Klimova	Nominated
MTV Russia Movie Awards, 2009	Best Movie Villain	Ralph Schicha	Nominated
MTV Russia Movie Awards, 2009	Best Kiss	Danila Kozlovsky and Ekaterina Klimova	Nominated
