= Gypsy Happiness =

- Russian: Цыганское счастье
- Directed by: Sergey Nikonenko
- Written by: Sergey Nikonenko; Yevgeni Nosov
- Starring: Nikolay Kryuchkov; Ivan Kamensky; Marina Yakovleva; Ekaterina Voronina; Georgiy Svetlani
- Cinematography: Mikhail Goykhberg
- Music by: Vladimir Martynov
- Release date: 1981
- Running time: 79 minute
- Country: Soviet Union
- Language: Russian

Gypsy Happiness (Russian: Цыганское счастье) is a 1981 Soviet drama film directed by Sergey Nikonenko.

== Plot ==
The film tells about a gypsy woman named Maria, who has a son, Sashka, with whom she settles in the village. There Sasha finds friends and love.

== Cast ==
- Nikolay Kryuchkov
- Ivan Kamensky
- Marina Yakovleva
- Ekaterina Voronina
- Georgiy Svetlani
- Sergey Nikonenko
- Ekaterina Zhemchuzhnaya
- Lidiya Fedoseeva-Shukshina
- Andrey Smolyakov
- Lev Borisov
