= Dawns Are Kissing =

- Russian: Целуются зори
- Directed by: Sergey Nikonenko
- Written by: Vasili Belov
- Starring: Boris Saburov; Ivan Ryzhov; Andrey Smolyakov; Mariya Skvortsova; Yelena Rubtsova
- Cinematography: Anatoliy Zabolotsky
- Edited by: Tamara Belyayeva
- Music by: Vladimir Martynov
- Release date: 1978
- Running time: 76 minute
- Country: Soviet Union
- Language: Russian

Dawns Are Kissing (Russian: Целуются зори, romanized: Tseluyutsya zori) is a 1978 Soviet comedy film directed by Sergey Nikonenko.

== Plot ==
The film tells about the collective farmer and tractor driver who go to the city and end up in various ridiculous situations.

== Cast ==
- Boris Saburov
- Ivan Ryzhov
- Andrey Smolyakov
- Mariya Skvortsova
- Yelena Rubtsova
- Ekaterina Voronina
- Anatoliy Pereverzev
- Mikhail Kokshenov
- Boris Levinson
- Sergey Nikonenko
