= Drobot =

Drobot may refer to:

== People with the surname ==
- John Drobot (1926–1998), Canadian politician
- Maria Drobot (born 1982), Russian politician
- Mark Drobot (born 1986), Ukrainian actor
- Michael Drobot, American entrepreneur and hospital administrator
- Natalia Drobot (born 2005), Australian canoeist
- Volodymyr Drobot (born 1972), Ukrainian football player

== Fiction ==
- Drobot, a playable dragon character in the Skylanders video game franchise

== See also ==
- Drobo, a manufacturer of external computer storage devices
- Drobo, Ghana
