= Smoke-free bathhouse =

1977 song by Vladimir Vysotsky

Song by Vladimir Vysotsky

from the album Tight rope
- Language: Russian
- Released: 1977
- Recorded: 1977
- Genre: Bard
- Label: Polydor Records
- Songwriter: Vladimir Vysotsky

Smoke-free bathhouse (or White Bathhouse; in Russian: Банька по-белому, "Heat the bath for me, hostess...", "Heat the smoke bath for me...") is a song by Vladimir Vysotsky, composed in the summer of 1968 during the filming of the movie Master of the Taiga in Siberia. A variant of the title is the Bathhouse. The first known concert performance of the song by the author dates back to 1969. The poem was published in Russian during the poet's lifetime in Paris in 1977 in the third part of the collection Songs of Russian Bards, and in the autumn of the same year the song was released in France on the record La corde raide. In 1979, it was included, along with other poems by Vysotsky, in the literary almanac Metropol (edited by Vasily Aksyonov, Andrei Bitov, and others), the publication of which was the occasion for a large meeting of the Moscow branch of the Union of Writers of the USSR. The first official publication of this poem in the USSR took place in 1986 (Druzhba Narodov, No. 10).

The song was received with mixed reactions by the poet's contemporaries. Along with Smoke Bathhouse and Ballad of the Bathhouse — is part of Vysotsky's conventional Bathhouse Cycle. The poem has a lot of symbols and allegories, its genre is close to historical elegy. When composing the music, the author used the technique of crescendo, which allowed him to express the feelings of the main character-narrator as accurately as possible.

In 2000, the lyrics of the song Smoke-free bathhouse were included in the textbook on 20th century literature for Russian secondary schools. The work was translated into Japanese and a number of European languages and included in albums recorded by musicians from Austria, Poland and Italy. In 1996, a memorial bas-relief with Vysotsky's image was erected at the place where the film crew of Master of the Taiga worked in Vyezhny Log. The plaque is inscribed with lines from the song : "Warm me a white bath, I've got used to the white light..."

== Description ==
In an interview conducted in June 1974 during the tour of the Taganka Theater in Naberezhnye Chelny, a journalist asked Vysotsky: "Which of your songs are particularly dear to you?" "It has to be all of them," Vysotsky replied. After some thought, he listed several of his songs, putting Bathhouse first.

The narrator of the song is a released prisoner who spent many years in Stalin's camps. It presumably takes place in 1956, when an amnesty was announced for many innocent people convicted under political Article 58 ("counterrevolutionary agitation and propaganda").

The hero of the song expresses his condition metaphorically, allegorically. He asks the "hostess" to heat the bathhouse without smoke. It symbolizes the man's purification and his return to his former, normal life, to which he had become unaccustomed during his years of imprisonment. The bathhouse becomes the central image of the entire song, a place of reflection, experience, and rethinking of the past. In this place, originally perceived by Russians as the border between life and death, the hero of the song makes a choice for "life", steaming the "cold past" out of himself: "...and I whip with a birch broom // On the legacy of dark times".

The hero's story is reconstructed in a very general way. Vysotsky refuses unambiguous signs, the hero of the song is extremely generalized in order to maximally convey the feelings of one of those whose fate was mutilated by the Soviet regime. The narrator's "self" balances on the edge of someone else's collective consciousness, merging with it: "And then, whether in the quarry or drowning, // swallowing tears and raw material, (Note: "Raw materials" (untreated, low-grade) refer to ethyl or wine semi-finished product of drinking alcohol, usually used for technical needs. In the system of Soviet camps, the issuance of alcohol “to protect against colds” to prisoners “engaged in hard labor” was practiced until 1934.) // closer to the heart we stabbed profiles, // so that it could be heard the hearts tearing".

The last line of the song is "short, to the point and expressive": "Heat it up!../ No, don't do it!... / Heat it up!", expressing the emotional anguish and confusion over the contradictions of the era.

== History ==
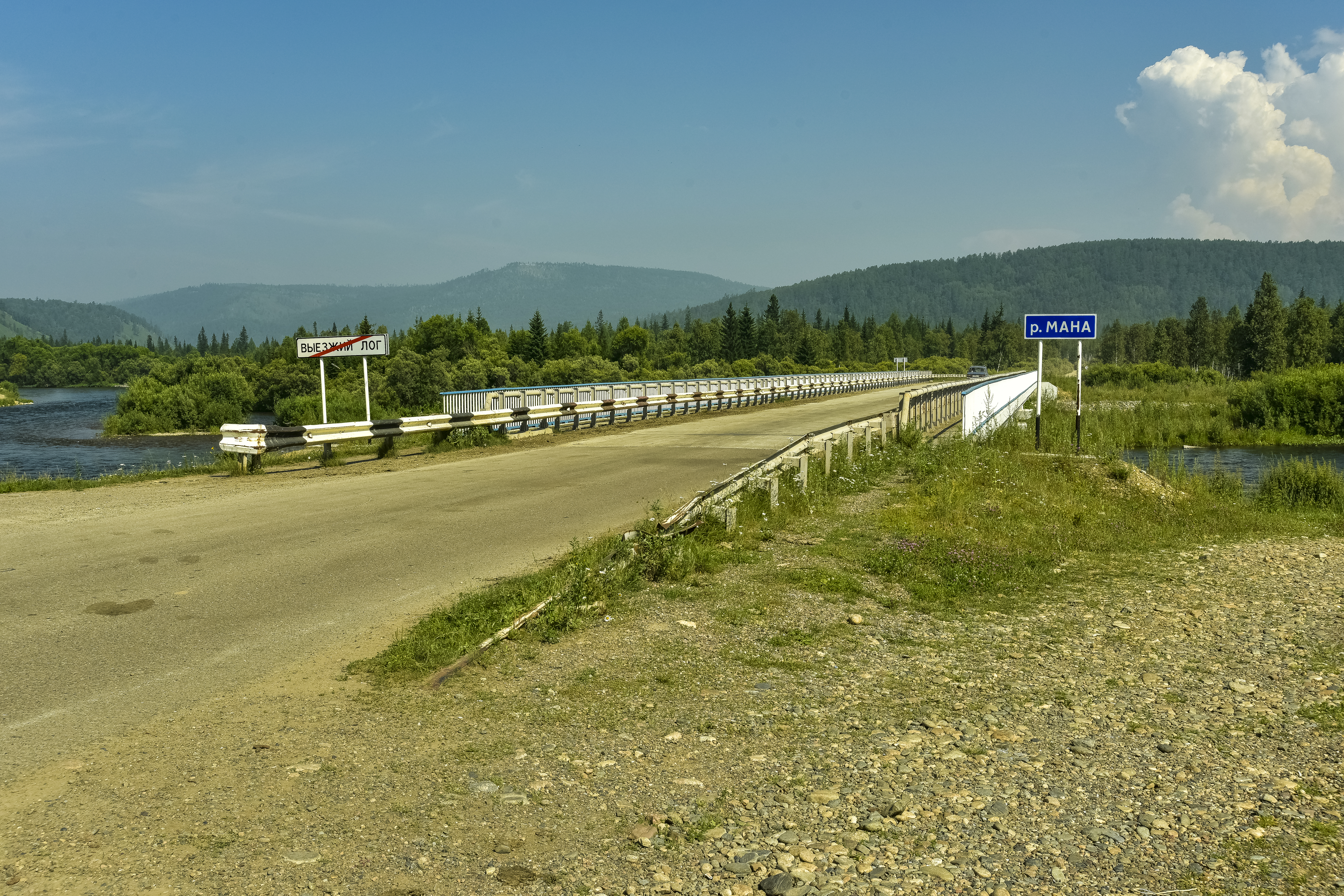
Surroundings of Vyzezhiy Log where the expedition of the movie Master of the Taiga worked

The song was written in the summer of 1968 in the village of Vyezzhiy Log, Krasnoyarsk region, where the film Master of the Taiga was shot. Vysotsky played one of the main roles in the movie. Actor Valeri Zolotukhin (who, in his words, received an autograph from Vysotsky: "To Valeri Zolotukhin — a co-conspirator of Bathhouse") described in detail the history of the song's creation. During the filming of the movie Zolotukhin and Vysotsky several times changed their place of residence, including some time lived in an empty, abandoned Siberian house, which left, going to the city, the son of one of the villagers — Anna Filippovna. Mosfilm allocated for accommodation only two cots and some supplies. A photographer of the film crew gave them a lamp. At night, by the light of this lamp, Vladimir Vysotsky wrote his songs, because during the day he was busy working on the film.There was nothing in the house to make curtains, and quite often the locals came to the artists to see the "living Vysotsky" — some looked through the window, and some asked to be shown "up close". Enterprising Zolotukhin began to ask the villagers to bring milk. That summer Vladimir often steamed in a bathhouse: "There is no lack of bathhouses in Siberia". Sometimes he would ask Zolotukhin questions: "What's the difference between a white-style bathhouse and a black-style bathhouse?", (Note: A non-smoke o white bathhouse is the one where the smoke from the stove goes out through a chimney (in a smoke or black bathhouse there is no chimney, and soot and grime leave the room through natural cracks, settling on the ceiling and walls).) "What do you call the place where they steam, shelf?", and once woke him up "with a guitar at the ready" and played the song "White-style bathhouse": "in a humming, abandoned house, filled with milk pots, in the light of a lamp with five hundred obvious candles sounded 'banya'..."

The actress Lionella Pyryeva, who played the role of the cook Nyurka in Master of the Taiga, says in her memoirs that Vysotsky played this song for the first time after the gathering of the film crew in a local club. According to her, it was obvious from Zolotukhin's reaction that he was hearing the song for the first time.

Stanislav Govorukhin gives an account from his diary of his arrival in Vyezzhiy Log in August of that year. He reached the village only at night, and the first thing he heard from Vysotsky was: "What a song I wrote!" Govorukhin had not yet had time to remove his backpack from the road, and Zolotukhin and Vysotsky "were already sitting side by side on a bench, singing in two voices Bathhouse. Never again have I heard such a heartfelt performance".

Vysotsky's classmate and friend Igor Kokhanovsky, recalling Vysotsky's return from the filming of Master of the Taiga, says that right from the Kazan station he came to his house "all impatient" and first sang "Heat me a white bathhouse..." Kokhanovsky asked him to sing it again and made an assessment: "It seems to me... everything that happened before this song was a warm-up. And the real thing is just beginning". According to him, Vysotsky agreed with him.

Marina Vlady wrote the following lines remembering this song:

You brought a song from Siberia about people who went to a prison camp under Stalin: a man returns after serving his time and asks his mistress to make him a white bath to kill his doubts and purify his soul. A scary song, where for the first time you mention my pet name — Marinka....

== First editions, recordings and performances ==
The first concert performance of the song was recorded on a phonograph in 1969. In Russian, the poem was published during the poet's lifetime in Paris in 1977 in the collection Songs of Russian Bards and in the fall of the same year the song was released on the record La corde raide under the title "L'étuve chauffée a blanc". In 1979, the poem was published in the first, scandalous issue of the almanac Metropol, published by the American publishing house Ardis.

The anthology contained twenty of the poet's poems. According to Evgeny Popov (one of the editors of the collection), Vysotsky took an active part in the preparation of his texts for publication and took very seriously the selection of the best versions, edits and changes of some lines.

Vasily Aksyonov, who actively participated in the organization of the almanac, recalls that Vladimir was "delighted" with the invitation to publish in Metropol. During the persecution of the authors and organizers of the collection, when "the bigwigs of the Union of Soviet Writers, on the orders of the competent authorities, of course, tightened the screws more and more, and also spread vile gossip", Vysotsky organized a spontaneous concert in the apartment where the Metropol people gathered:

We were all suddenly revived, feeling as if we were in the rays of a star. He was a superstar, and in his best creative hours he gave us a powerful charge of life-giving prana. He sang then and Volky and Bathhouse and The domes in Russia are covered with pure gold... and all the people here in the metropolis stirred and hummed.

In the USSR, the poem Smoke-free bathhouse was first officially published in 1986 in the 10th issue of the magazine Druzhba Narodov. The Melodiya company released the song in 1990 on the record Masquerade (the fifteenth in the series On Vladimir Vysotsky's Concerts, M60 49469 002) in a 1977 recording. The last known public performance of the piece dates from 1976.

== Reviews and memories ==
The reaction of Vysotsky's contemporaries to the song was ambiguous. Thus, the poet Yakov Kozlovsky at an extended meeting of the secretariat of the Moscow organization of the Union of Writers of the USSR, which considered the case of Metropolis in January 1979, expressed bewilderment at the inclusion in the almanac of verses by the unrecognized poet (among whom was Bouthhouse): "What's Vysotsky for? Let him spin on the ribbons". Another member of the meeting —the poet Stanislav Kunyaev— in a conversation with the publicist Vladimir Bondarenko, almost twenty years after the poet's death, stated that in the song Smoke-free Bouthhouse "one can feel the social order that he [Vysotsky] fulfilled". According to Kunyaev, in an effort to capture the moods of the most diverse social groups, the author of the song made of his hero "a hybrid of blatant and political. Very talented, very clever inorganicity... Clear theatricality".

According to the memoirs, some of Vysotsky's colleagues did not like the song either. Naum Korzhavin, for example, said that he appreciated the poet's domestic dramas, but at the same time admitted that Bathhouse was not one of his favorite works: "It may be good, but I don't know it, as soon as Bathhouse starts, I can't do anything with myself, I just don't hear it". According to the artist Mihail Chemiakin, the poet Andrei Voznesensky treated both poems —Smoke bathhouse and Smoke-free bathhouse— rather indulgently: during one of Vysotsky's home concerts, when the guests — Romen Theatre actors- began to shed tears of excitement, he patted the performer on the shoulder, saying "Old man, you're growing up..."

At the same time, according to the translator David Karapetyan, who witnessed many of the twists and turns of Vysotsky's life, the film director Andrei Tarkovsky, who heard Bathhouse for the first time in 1968, not only called it "a great thing," but subsequently tried to reproduce the song "when he was drunk". The literary writer Yuz Aleshkovsky also spoke fondly of it, writing in 1982 in the New York weekly Novaya Gazeta that this work was "stamped with a seal of extraordinary depth:

I won't tell you how I personally feel when I listen to Bathhouse for the tenth or hundredth time, when I sing it to myself (I don't dare to sing it out loud) in moments of reflection about Russia, about our fate, about the fate of the world. It's impossible that it doesn't pierce the heart of a normal person. It's not by chance that I repeat this word, the passion to cleanse oneself of the filth of Soviet life, of the lies that have entered the bloodstream, the passion to revive the norms of existence worthy of a human being, the passion to put an end once and for all to the demonic forces that in moments of despair seem to be beyond our will.

== Bath cycle in Vysotsky's work ==
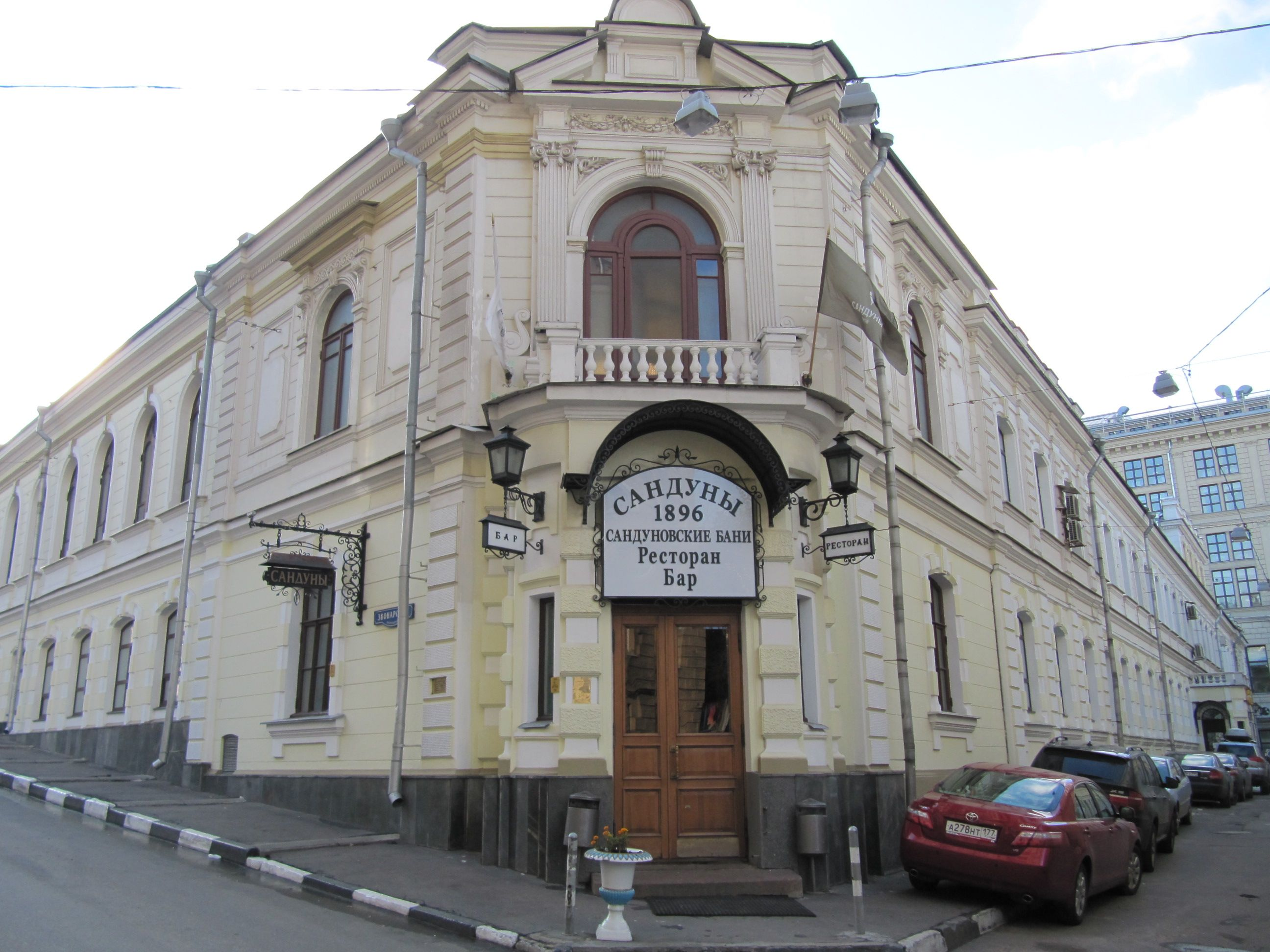
Sandunov Baths in Moscow

Vysotsky did not share his friends' love of the bathhouse for a long time, until the early 1960s. As the poet Igor Kokhanovsky, who grew up on Neglinnaya Street in Moscow, recalls, one day some friends in common brought them tickets to the Sandunov Baths next door: "Volodya and I, after a decent hangover, of course refused. But they assured us that the best hangover is a steam bath. After eucalyptus steam, treatments with oak brooms, ice showers, and a mug of cold beer, Vysotsky, according to Kokhanovsky, began to appreciate the healing power of the baths. The poet's interest in the bathhouse as an ethnographic object and the mythopoetic rituals and representations associated with it arose later during the Master of the Taiga filming. In the song Smoke-free bathhouse, composed during the film expedition, Vysotsky for the first time presented the bathhouse as an almost sacred place.

This theme was developed in the song Smoke-free bathhouse, written in 1971, which may have been a kind of response to the return of the writer Andrei Sinyavsky from the colony. This work seems to be the antipode of Smoke-free bathhouse, because it tells a diametrically opposite story: the narrator does not gain freedom, but, on the contrary, goes from freedom to prison.

Late in 1971, Vysotsky composed Ballad of the Bathhouse, the key message of which ("Here freedom and equality with brotherhood // You feel in the steam of the night") echoes the poems of the parodist Pyotr Schumacher, quoted in Vladimir Gilyarovsky's book Moscow and Muscovites: "And what? Oh joy! Oh joy! // I found my cherished ideal - // liberty, equality and fraternity - // in the bathhouses". Vysotsky also plays ironically with the equality of the bathhouse in his poem I beg your pardon (1971), which includes the lines "Nakedness unites nobles and commoners". The image of the bathhouse is also found in the poet's works devoted to other themes. Thus, in Letter to a Friend (1975, 1978), addressed to the actor Ivan Bortnik, the author tells of his French impressions and concludes: "And in general, Vanya, you and I in Paris // need, as in the Russian bath skis".

== Artistic characteristics ==
=== Plot's development ===
According to the memoirs of Yevgeny Pronin, professor emeritus of Moscow State University, in 1943, as a teenager in a small town in the Tula region, he met a disabled front-line soldier who, holding a helmet in his hands, mechanically repeated the same phrase: "Tanker. On the left chest...". Years later, after hearing Smoke-free bathhouse, the scientist confessed that he was amazed and verbatim reproduced "grammatical incident", and Vysotsky's ability to convey the human drama in two lines: "On the left part of the chest - Stalin's profile, // and on the right Marinka's full face". Researchers believe that Stalin's tattoo is one of the leitmotifs and engines of the song's plot. In the beginning, this symbol is simply labeled and demonstrated: "And the tattoo of the times of the cult of personality // Will turn blue on the left breast". Later, with the mention of the enfas and the profile, the idea of the hero's "inner conflict" arises, on whose chest two "symbols of faith" have collided.

In the following verses, the story becomes more and more tense, reaching its climax in the lines "Closer to the heart we stabbed the profiles, // So that he could hear the hearts tearing". But the tension does not subside — the hero, warmed by the hot steam, continues to reflect aloud, openly, on his experiences, coming to a terrible conclusion, bordering on "the death of the soul": "As it turned out, I was branded in vain". However, he does not reach the point of complete inner devastation — the character of the song leaves the past "somewhere beyond the pass of culmination". Near the finale, having told his story, he reaches a new level of purification. The changes in the narrator's consciousness and mood are captured in the line: "And I whip the legacy of dark times with a birch broom". The idea that what has been experienced is not a summation but a stage of life is articulated in the very last verse, which builds on the contrast with the first. If at the beginning of the song the hero asks the hostess to heat the bathhouse because he is "used to the white light", at the end the request sounds different — "that I get used to the white light". The same antithesis is "hot steam" (at the beginning) and "cold ladle" (at the end).

In each of the four verses of Smoke-free Bathhouse, the same embodied symbol —"Stalin's tattoo"— is brougt to the consciousness. Each time with a special shade of meaning, a progressively developing understanding, like variations of a leitmotif or knots of a plot, and each time with an exceeding of the expressiveness of classical compositional techniques.

=== Lexical and genre uniqueness ===
In the early 1960s, the language of the Soviet intelligentsia began to be saturated with elements of prison slang. This demonstrative movement toward marginality, according to researchers, looked like a kind of challenge to the authorities with the help of illegal vocabulary, society seemed to declare a spontaneous desire for freedom. The poet Yevgeny Yevtushenko, noticing the new social phenomenon, wrote a poem The intelligentsia sings blatnye songs, which, in particular, contained the lines: "Writers sing in Pakhra in their dachas, // even geologists and atomic scientists sing". The young Vysotsky, who made a certain contribution to the development of this genre, also tried to express his protest against "linguistic officialism" through his vocabulary. For example, in his song Tattoo he used word combinations that were far from the literary norm: "poked out your image", "the soul is scratched from the inside".

In contrast to Vysotsky's early songs, which do not contain global social generalizations, Smoke-free Bathhouse has already acquired epic features, but the author remained true to himself: in the narrator's monologue, the poet combined the speech of a Moscow intellectual with the colloquialisms of a "simple Siberian". Thus, literary expressions (for example, "from the fog of the coldest past") are juxtaposed in the text with dialect words ("how many sorrows and traces have been learned"). Such a mixture of different levels of vocabulary shows that the image of the hero contains the biographies of different people. Their personal dramas are revealed, among other things, through metaphors. For example, the verb "to burn" is used in the song in the sense of "to lose one's self-control, to lose one's head. The phrase "to rest in paradise" is close in meaning to the expression "to remain in timelessness".

Researchers pay attention to obvious linguistic "errors" in the narrator's confession. Thus, in the hero's recollections of the past ("How much faith and forests have fallen, // How much grief and paths have been learned!"), Vysotsky combines words with incompatible generic features: "faith" (from the point of view of grammatical norms) should not be combined with the verb like "fall", and "traces" does not correlate well with the notion of "to know" (in situations where we are talking about the experienced, the experienced). Nevertheless, the poet deliberately uses these expressions to show that in the mind of the hero, who has spent many years away from the "white light," the faith professed by a man and a man likened to a forest tree are involuntarily intertwined. Equally important for the character's understanding of the circumstances of his biography are the elements of the evaluative vocabulary contained in the monologue: "hopeless," "unspeakable," and others. The fact that the hero's deeply troubled soul is searching for the strength to revive itself is proved by the final, overbearing lines: "Sink!... Don't drown!... Protopi!"

Vysotsky pressed and melted rhythms, words and metaphors, so that the information flow was laid down itself in a logical way of thought and generalization emerged with the immutability of truth, self-evident, exhaustive and useful for the future. That was a matter of skills, not of blind naivety.

The Smoke-free Bouthhouse (as well as the later Ballad of Childhood) —with its enduring memory and equally complex "collective past"— is, according to literary scholars, close to the historical elegy, a genre that goes back to the experiences of the poet Konstantin Batyushkov. While writing Bathhouse, Vysotsky probably drew on the stories he used in his earlier works. The difference lies in the fact that he places the same characters, who have returned from the camps, in a "stoned" bathhouse, and in it "a drama of a completely different level is played out": "These poems have Pushkin's dramatic level".

=== Symbols and allegories ===
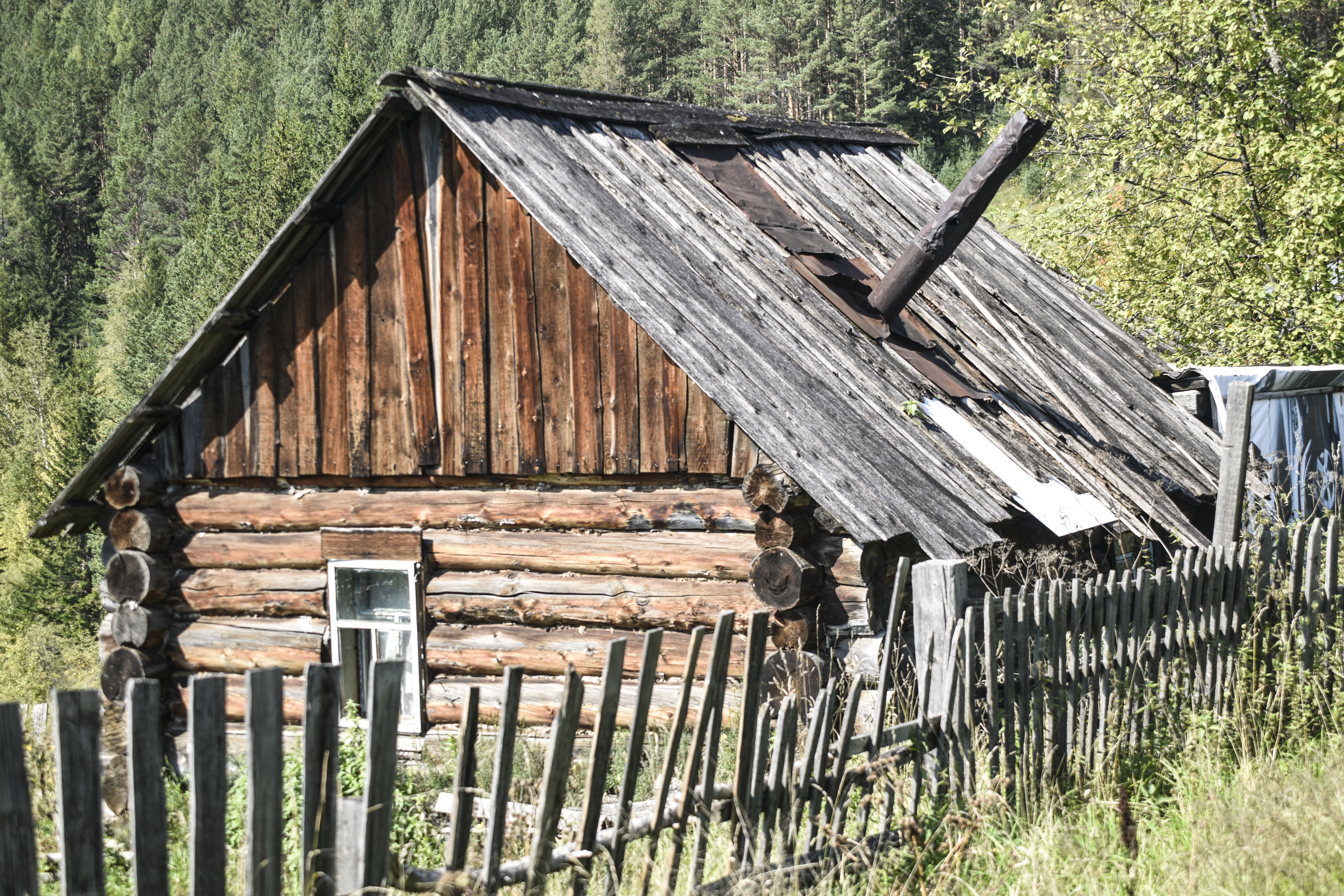
Smoke-free bathhouse in Krasnoyarsk region

The bathhouse in the song is not just a standard place for body-washing. Its image contains a deep allegorical meaning, based on the folk belief that in this space — devoid of icons, open to passions and temptations — a person is particularly defenseless and vulnerable. The work is full of everyday details ("shelf", "birch broom", "ladle"), but in the general context of the poem, everyday words grow to the level of symbols: washing becomes ablution, purification becomes enlightenment and transformation. One of the symbols is embedded in the title Smoke-free Bathhouse (or White Bouthhouse literally translated from Russian). According to Valeri Zolotukhin's recollections, when he answered a comrade's question about the difference between a smoky and a smoke-free bathhouse during a film expedition, he said that the latter was usually "cultured, clean inside" and that the smoke from it was led through the chimney directly "into the white light". On the basis of these ideas, Vysotsky created the metaphor of "white", in which he introduced the idea of normal human life and showed how difficult it is sometimes to move from darkness to light.

Another metaphor is present in the line "How many years have I been resting in paradise! The word "paradise" in the text is directly connected with places not so far away - and the poet directly indicates their "addresses": we are talking about sinks, quarries and moving "from Siberia to Siberia". Researchers suggest that this symbol appeared in the USSR in connection with the emergence of a "new religion" — communist morality denied the former belief in God, it was replaced by belief in an all-powerful leader, and paradise as a gracious social structure served in this model as a reward for "selfless faith". Vysotsky probably realized that the hope for a "bright future" promised by Soviet ideologists was a collective illusion; in his later poem Paradise Apples, the poet developed the theme: "We came skipping. I looked, there was nothing paradisiacal before my eyes: // A barren wasteland and nothingness - lawlessness!" The hero of Bathhouse gradually comes to the same realization, discovering that the seemingly immutable idol turns out to be defeated, and that he himself has been deceived in his aspirations for many years.

== Literary similarities ==
According to the writer Dmitry Bykov, Bathhouse is an author's song that does not carry any motifs and intonations of folklore, including backyard folklore. At the same time, literary scholars Andrei Skobelev and Sergei Shaulov remind us that Vysotsky carefully studied the mythopoetics of the bathhouse, according to which the suggestion to "take a bath" in the old days meant a touch with other, otherworldly worlds. It is not by chance, researchers believe, that in the poem On the Death of Shukshin (1974) the poet considers the last bath in the context of a farewell step: "And after the indispensable bath, // Clean before God and firm, // Suddenly he died in earnest, // Calmer than on the screen". Vysotsky admitted that he, a man not at all sentimental, cried almost for the first time in his life when he learned of Shukshin's death. Six years later, when the country reacted to Vysotsky's death with many poems and songs, Valentin Gaft combined the names of the two artists in the poem Hooligans: "In order not to humiliate ourselves for pennies, // In order not to live in an idiotic way, mother // The hooligan Shukshin had died, // The hooligan Vysotsky had died".

Shukshin's and Vysotsky's rebellious heroes were united by "a void in the soul" (critic Lev Anninsky's term), and therefore the hero of Smoke-free bathhouse, who is painfully, painfully searching for his groove, is close in spirit and fate to Egor Prokudin of Shukshin's "Red Clay"-both characters are in the bathhouse, trying and failing to get rid of "the fog of the cold past".

Such a confession tone of Shukshin's and Vysotsky's heroes was a clear contradiction to the spirit and style of the "stagnant" era, marked the first impulses to the purifying epiphany of the nation.

Vysotsky also had a kind of "literary roll call" with Alexander Galich, who, according to his contemporaries, first heard Bathhouse performed by the author in his house and "spoke highly of it and of Vysotsky as a poet". Certain echoes of this theme were heard in Galich's work a few years later in the novel Once More About the Devil: for example, the interior of a certain "safe house" involved in the story was an empire "of the times of the cult of personality". Other reminiscences can be found in Galich's poem Reflections on Long-Distance Runners, when the political prisoners working with a pickaxe suddenly hear a loud voice as if from heaven: "I was your leader and your father, / How many tortures are planned! According to literary scholar Anatoly Kulagin, this phrase is immediately reminiscent of Bathhouse specifically, the line "How much faith and forest have fallen". "The semantic and syntactic similarity (perhaps conscious) is obvious here".

== Music and performance ==
Trying to show the human type, the character of the hero in development, Vysotsky uses such a musical technique as crescendo in the song Smoke-free bathhouse. The increasing volume of the sound together with the change of intonation allows the author to convey the whole palette of emotional experiences and mental metamorphosis of the character, in whose consciousness memories keep reappearing in waves, dulled, it seems. With the help of musical and intonational means, Vysotsky describes in detail and in depth the feelings, thoughts and experiences of the hero. Using this song as an example, we can see, first of all, the musical regularity that guides the structure of words, phrases of grammatical and syntactical structure, which leads to a new musical consciousness of lyroepic poetry.

The "classical" version of Vysotsky's songs is considered to be the author's singing under the guitar. Konstantin Kazansky, the author of the arrangements for Vysotsky's "French" recordings, said that before the creation of the album La corde raide Jacques Urevitch (the initiator of the record) asked him why Kazansky used only two guitars in his arrangements for Vysotsky. When the arranger explained that it was Vysotsky's wish and taste, Urevitch talked to the poet and got carte blanche for Kazansky - in the recording of some songs an orchestra can be heard. Vladimir Vysotsky himself liked many of the orchestral arrangements: "A successful arrangement, for example, of Picky Horses - I can't sing it in concerts now. There are very mixed opinions, as many people as there are opinions about it. What can I say? I am very happy with the accompaniment of Bathhouse and Bolshoi Karetny, which are on one of the disks - there are simple, guitarless accompaniments, I am glad that we did not complicate them".

== Cultural impact ==
The song has retained its topicality for decades after it was written. For the anniversary of Vysotsky's death, the Taganka Theater prepared a musical and poetic composition Vladimir Vysotsky, in which, among other works, Bathhouse was performed (it was sung by Valeri Zolotukhin). According to Yuri Lyubimov, this place in the production was "very lively". After the performance, very famous Soviet writers confessed to the director that for them Vysotsky as a poet had opened only now. Immediately after the premiere on July 25, 1981, the play was banned.

In 1990, the literary and art magazine Avrora reproduced the actor Rolan Bykov's prediction about Vysotsky's work made ten years earlier: "I think that very soon schools will study such a poet". In the following decades, Vysotsky's poems and songs were indeed included in school programs, including electives. In 2000, for example, Free-smoke Bathhouse was included in the textbook Russian Literature of the 20th Century for the 11th grade of secondary schools. According to literary scholar Anatoly Kulaguin, who wrote the chapter Author's Songs for this textbook, Bathhouse can be studied in the so-called combined lessons under the conventional title Out of the Mists of the Cold Past... together with Galich's Cloudy Days — together with Galich's Clouds and Tvardovsky's poem By the Right of Memory.

Interest in the song among foreign listeners remains. In Poland, for example, its translation by Alexey Avdeev ("Polish Dimitrievich"), a native of Russia, was highly appreciated. In 2004, the song about banya, translated as "Łaźnia", was included in the CD Mam jedno oko zielone prepared by the singer Wiktor Zborowski. Since the beginning of the 21st century, Smoke-free Bathhouse has been part of the repertoire of the German singer Gerd Kramber. In 2002, the song was included on the Die Trouba Tour album released in Austria. Three years later, the band Les Anarchistes recorded a CD in Italy on which Bathhouse is called Il Bagno Alla Bianca. In Hungary, according to opinion polls, Bathhouse is one of Vysotsky's best-known songs, along with Hamlet, Ballad of Love and Wolf Hunt.

To commemorate the film Master of the Taiga and Bathhouse written in Vyezy Log, in 1996 Krasnoyarsk local historians erected a bas-relief with Vysotsky's image and lines from his song carved on the plate: "Warm my banya white, I've got used to white light". There is a version published by members of the Siberian Society of History and Culture, according to which the stone found in the Manskaya taiga and later used for the memorial sculpture could be a "hypothetical fragment of the Tunguska meteorite".

In 2002, Norwegian musician Jørn-Simen Everly visited Vyzezhny Log, who made a documentary film dedicated to Vysotsky as a result of his Siberian expedition.

The song had a certain influence on the tone of Alexei Ivanov's novel The Geographer Drank Away the Globe. In one of the episodes of the work it is told how the young Victor Sluzhkin, suffering from unrequited love for Lena Anfimova, listens to a tape of Vysotsky's songs for a long time at night and feels that it is him, "a convict painted with tattoos, being steamed by the hostess in the bathhouse". The songs, whose hero the teenager imagines himself to be, not only change his mood, but also to a large extent shape his future behavior.

The quotation refers to the song "Heat the bath for me, hostess...", and through it to all of Vysotsky's songs with prison camp and "blatnaya" themes. The romantic element of the blatnoy world, so significant for a teenager, like a tattoo and the history hidden behind it, is actualized here.

== Bibliography ==
- Bakin, V. (2011). Владимир Высоцкий. Жизнь после смерти [Vladimir Vysotsky. Life after death.]. Лучшие биографии (in Russian). М.: Алгоритм. ISBN 978-5-457-51403-4.
- Kokhanovsky, I. (2017). "Всё не так, ребята…": Владимир Высоцкий в воспоминаниях друзей и коллег [“Everything is wrong, guys...": Vladimir Vysotsky in the memories of friends and colleagues]. Великие шестидесятники (in Russian). М.: АСТ. p. 512. ISBN 978-5-17-098692-7.
- Vysotsky, V. (1991). Сочинения. В 2 томах [Essays. In 2 volumes.] (in Russian). Vol. 1. М.: Художественная литература. p. 639. ISBN 5-280-02361-2.
- Vysotsky, V. (2012a). Больно мне за наш СССР…: [Стихотворения] [Our USSR hurts me...: [Poems]] (in Russian). СПб.: Амфора. p. 127. ISBN 978-5-367-02111-0.
- Vysotsky, V. (2012b). Приготовьтесь — сейчас будет грустно: [Стихотворения] [Get ready - it's going to be sad: [Poems]] (in Russian). СПб.: Амфора. p. 128. ISBN 978-5-367-02114-1.
- Vysotsky, V. (2012c). Я был душой дурного общества…: [Стихотворения] [I was the soul of a bad society....: [Poems]] (in Russian). СПб.: Амфора. p. 127. ISBN 978-5-367-02109-7.
- Vysotsky, V. (2012d). Ловите ветер всеми парусами: [Стихотворения] [Catch the wind with all your sails: [Poems]] (in Russian). СПб.: Амфора. p. 127. ISBN 978-5-367-02115-8.
- Krychko V. B., Dazkovskaya M. A. (2014). Блатная и репрессированная лексика в поэтических текстах В. Высоцкого // Научно-методический электронный журнал «Концепт» [Blatnaya and repressed vocabulary in the poetic texts of V. Vysotsky] (in Russian). Vol. 20. Research and methodological electronic journal “Concept”. pp. 676–680.
- Kulaguin, A. V. (2016). Беседы о Высоцком [Conversations about Vysotsky] (in Russian). Издательские решения. p. 164. ISBN 978-5-4474-8196-4.
- Pronina E. E., Pronin E. I. (2005). Предтеча мультимедиа (феномен В. Высоцкого и новейшие информационные технологии) // Вестник Московского университета [The forerunner of multimedia (the phenomenon of V. Vysotsky and the latest information technologies) // Bulletin of Moscow University] (in Russian). М.: Издат-во Московского университета. pp. 35–55.
