= The Sky Is Beyond the Clouds =

1973 Soviet film

- Russian: За облаками — небо
- Directed by: Yuri Yegorov
- Written by: Yuzef Printsev; Yuri Yegorov
- Starring: Gennady Sayfulin; Sergey Nikonenko; Larisa Malevannaya; Igor Yasulovich; Naina Honina
- Production company: Gorky Film Studio
- Release date: 1973
- Running time: 75 minutes
- Country: Soviet Union
- Language: Russian

The Sky Is Beyond the Clouds (Russian: За облаками — небо) is a 1973 Soviet aviation film directed by Yuri Yegorov.

The film tells about pilots and designers who, after the war, tried out new jet technology.

== Plot ==
The film tells the story of Soviet aircraft designers and test pilots who, after the end of World War II, dedicate themselves to mastering MiG jet fighters, often risking their lives in the process. The plot focuses on three main characters—Viktor (Igor Yasulovich), Yevgeny (Sergey Nikonenko), and Alexei (Gennady Saifullin)—as they return from the war in the Far East and begin working on the development of a new jet aircraft. Viktor and Yevgeny take positions at an aviation factory as a designer and an engineer, respectively, while Alexei becomes a test pilot for the new technology.

The film also explores the personal challenges faced by the protagonists. Viktor's wife (Elena Sanaeva) leaves him for a wounded man she nursed in a hospital. Alexei's actions lead to the destruction of his own family. Only Yevgeny manages to maintain a stable and happy family life amidst the professional and personal turmoil.

== Cast ==
- Gennady Sayfulin
- Sergey Nikonenko
- Larisa Malevannaya
- Igor Yasulovich
- Naina Honina
- Elena Sanaeva
- Mikhail Gluzskiy
- Vladislav Dvorzhetskiy
- Yury Nazarov
- Nikolay Volkov
