= Grigoriy R. =

Russian television series

- Genre: Historical drama
- Created by: Ilya Tilkin; Eduard Volodarsky
- Directed by: Andrey Malyukov
- Starring: Vladimir Mashkov; Andrey Smolyakov; Ekaterina Klimova; Ingeborga Dapkunaite
- Composer: Ivan Burlyaev
- Country of origin: Russia
- Original language: Russian
- No. of seasons: 1
- No. of episodes: 8

Production
- Executive producer: Ruben Disdishian
- Producers: Elena Denisevich, Aram Movsesyan
- Production location: Russia
- Cinematography: Alexei Fedorov, Vladimir Klimov
- Editor: Igor Litoninsky
- Running time: 45-50 minutes
- Production company: Mars Media Entertainment

Original release
- Network: Rossiya 1
- Release: September 11 – October 2, 2014

Grigory R. (Григорий Р. in Russian, sometimes marketed in the United States as Rasputin) is a Russian television eight-episode historical drama short series focusing on Grigory Rasputin, created by Ilya Tilkin and Eduard Volodarsky, directed by Andrei Malyukov.

== Plot ==
After the 1917 February Revolution, the Russian Provisional Government established a state commission to investigate the circumstances of Grigory Rasputin's death aiming at the vilification of his political activities, way of life and public presentation of his influence on the imperial family and its entourage, as that of an evil criminal. At the center of the plot is (fictional) detective Heinrich Switten, to whom Chairman Kerensky asks to collect every possible information about the life of the starets, or "spiritual holy man", from his youth in the village of Pokrovskoye, through his rise to fame and power -excessive, in the eyes of many courtiers- by means of his natural gift in faith healing and foretelling, until that December 1916 night, in which Rasputin was assassinated.

== Production ==
Ilya Tilkin wrote the script based on materials collected by Eduard Volodarsky. Director Andrei Malyukov began to work on the film, after having secured Vladimir Mashkov as a protagonist.

Most of the shooting took place in St. Petersburg and the surrounding area. The filming of the film about Rasputin was not welcomed by the official orthodox church, as Rasputin is a figure with a controversial reputation. Therefore, the filming team was not allowed to work in existing churches. As a result, many scenes were shot at the Antoniev Monastery in Novgorod a former church, now a museum. In the Yusupov Palace, where the conspirators killed Rasputin, now there is a Wax Museum, so the decorations of the palace were built at the "Lenfilm" film studio. The decorations of the tsar's wagon were also created there.

Vladimir Mashkov grew his hair for shooting, but his beard is artificial, made with special technology. In total, 5 wigs, 150 beards and about 300 moustaches were made for the film. Costume designer Tatiana Patrahaltseva found several antiques - a jacket and coat, worn by Mashkov. For the main characters - the royal family, Vyrubova, Rasputin, Swietten - all costumes were custom-made. In England, hard collars were ordered, several cylinders and canoes were bought, built according to the technologies of the time. French laces were created from historical designs.

The entire series in on YouTube, Russian-spoken, with English subtitles. Its IMDb ID is 4121340. It is also streamed in the U.S. by Amazon Prime where it received several very positive reviews

== Cast ==
- Vladimir Mashkov as Grigory Rasputin
- Andrey Smolyakov as (fictional) detective Heinrich Switten
- Sergey Ugryumov as Alexander Kerensky, chairman of the provisional revolutionary government
- Ekaterina Klimova as Anna Vyrubova, lady-in-waiting, best friend and confidante of Tsarina Alexandra
- Ingeborga Dapkunaite as Tsarina Alexandra Feodorovna
- Valery Degtyar as Tsar Nicholas II
- Vladimir Koshevoy as Prince Felix Yusupov
- Paulina Andreeva as Princess Irina Yusupova, nee Princess Romanova, his wife
- Nikita Yefremov as Grand Duke Dmitri Pavlovich of Russia
- Aleksandr Drobiitko as Tsarevich Alexei Nikolaevich, the Tsar's only son and heir to the throne
- Taisiya Wilkova as Maria Rasputina, Rasputin's daughter, aka Matryona
- Natalia Surkova as Praskovya Rasputina, Rasputin's wife
- Boris Kamorzin as Piotr Svistunov
- Mikhail Eliseev as Major general Vladimir Voeykov, adjutant to His Imperial Majesty and palace commandant
- Anna Dyukova as Princess Milica of Montenegro
- Vitali Kishchenko as Vladimir Purishkevich
- Vladimir Yumatov as tsarist Prime Minister Pyotr Stolypin
- Nadezhda Tolubeyeva as Natalia Stolypina, his daughter
- Sergey Barkovsky as Saint John of Kronstadt
- Leonid Mozgovoy as Bishop Isidore (born Piotr Kolokolov)
- Ilya Shakunov as Hieromonk Iliodor (born Sergei Trufanov)
- Oleg Garkusha as Mitya Kozelsky
- Yuri Orlov as The Father-Abbot
- Aleksey Baydakov as Andrey Derevyenko
- Stanislaw Koncevich as Sir George William Buchanan, British Ambassador to Russia
- Petar Sekavitsa as Oswald Rayner, British Secret Intelligence Service (MI6) agent
- Rustam Sagdullayev as Dr. Peter Badmayev, a physician trained in Tibetan medicine
- Sergey Muchenikov as Dr. Eugene Botkin, court physician
- Yuri Itzkov as hermit Antip Dushegub
- Andrei Zibrov as Dr. Lazovert
- Alexei Morozov as Lieutenant Sergey Sukhotin
- Maria Burlyaeva as Khioniya Guseva
- Sergey Gamov as General Nikolai Ruzsky

== Artistic and production team ==
- Scenarists - Ilya Tilkin, Eduard Volodarsky
- Director - Andrey Malyukov
- Operators - Alexei Fedorov, Vladimir Klimov
- Soundtrack composers - Ivan Burlyaev, Maxim Koshevarov
- Set designers - Vladimir Svetozarov, Marina Nikolaeva
- Costume Designer - Tatiana Patrahaltseva
- Makeup artist - Evgenia Malinkovskaya
- Producers - Elena Denisevich, Aram Movsesyan, Ruben Disdishian (Executive)

== Awards and nominations ==
- won Professional prize of the Association of Film and Television Producers in the field of television
- won Best Actor in a TV movie/series (Vladimir Mashkov)
- won prize in the category "Best Work of a Production Designer" (Vladimir Svetozarov, Marina Nikolaeva)
- won prize in the category "Best Makeup Artist" (Eugene Malinkovskaya
- nominated best costume designer (Tatiana Patrakhaltseva)
