= Coordinates of Death =

1985 film by Samvel Gasparov

Coordinates of Death; Координаты смерти
- Original film poster
- Directed by: Samvel Gasparov; Nguyễn Xuân Chân
- Screenplay by: Aleksandr Lapshin; Hoàng Tích Chỉ
- Production companies: Gorky Film Studio; Sovinfilm; Hãng phim truyện Việt Nam; FAFIM VIETNAM
- Release date: 1985 (USSR)
- Running time: 78 minutes with overture, entr'acte, and outro music
- Countries: USSR; Vietnam
- Languages: Russian; Vietnamese

Coordinates of Death (alternative title Target for Death; Russian: Координаты смерти, Vietnamese: Tọa độ chết) is a 1985 film by Samvel Gasparov (USSR) and Nguyen Xuan Chan (Vietnam). The film, which involved both Soviet and Vietnamese movie makers, is mostly about American brutality during the Vietnam War.

== Plot ==
Events depicted in the movie unfold in the late 1960s and early 1970s. The Americans are bombing Vietnamese towns and villages, breaking into households, killing women and children. All ships of the European merchant fleet have already left the coast of North Vietnam, but the Soviet dry cargo ship Chelyabinsk refuses to leave Vietnamese shores despite a United States military ultimatum. A few days later the ship is sunk and surviving Soviet sailors join a caravan of Vietnamese insurgents moving along the Ho Chi Minh Trail.

The plot concerns the visit of an American actress to war-torn North Vietnam. At the height of the Vietnam War, actress Kate Francis (a cinematic representation of Jane Fonda) travels along with the resistance fighters and witnesses first-hand the destruction heaped upon the Vietnamese people by the American forces. Before returning to the US in order to deliver the truth about the current state of matters to the wider international community, she organizes a press conference to relate all that she has seen and to literally sing the praises of the Vietnamese people.

Meanwhile, in Haiphong, Kate's Vietnamese friend Mai introduces her to her husband, combat engineer Phong, who has recently returned home from the Soviet Union aboard the Chelyabinsk. The CIA is preparing to detonate a bomb in Haiphong port, but friends manage to prevent it.

== Cast ==
- Aleksandr Galibin as Ivan Krutin
- Trần Lê Vân as Mai
- Đặng Lưu Việt Bảo as Phong
- Tatyana Lebedeva as Kate Francis
- Yury Nazarov as Captain Shukhov
- Daniil Netrebin
- Rudolf Pankov
- Nguyễn Huy Công
- Hoàng Uẩn
- Nguyễn Thị Thu An as the old mother
- Mai Châu as the woman carrying a baby

== Backstage ==
Filming took place in Hanoi and the most picturesque Vietnamese landscapes, such as the Central Highlands, Halong Bay and Haiphong. The film features a lot of high-budget scenes, such as downed American pilots, aircraft crashed into the sea, burned villages and mass battle-scenes. A lot of Soviet specialists worked in Vietnam portraying American military aviators.

== Soundtrack ==
Theme songs of the film, which appear at the beginning and end of the movie, are "The Spring" (composed by Pham Minh Tuan) and "The land of Vietnamese" (an anti-war song, which Kate Francis performed in the movie, though voiced by the famous Russian singer Larisa Dolina).

== Details ==
- Original music : Yevgeny Krylatov
- Cinematography : Thu Dan, Sergey Filippov
- Film editing : Tatyana Malyavina, Nguyen Thi Ninh
- Production design : Pyotr Pashkevich, Dao Duc
- Sound effects : Boris Koreshkov, Nguyen Quoc Can

== See also ==
- Bao giờ cho đến tháng Mười (1984, film)
- Life in the Forest (1987, East German-Vietnamese film)
- Hãng phim truyện Việt Nam
