= Samvel Gasparov =

Russian film director and short story writer (1938–2020)

- Born: Samvel Vladimirovich Gasparov; 7 June 1938; Tbilisi, Georgian SSR, Soviet Union (now Georgia)
- Died: 26 May 2020 (aged 81); Moscow, Russia
- Occupations: Actor, film director, screenwriter, producer
- Years active: 1974–2009

Samvel Vladimirovich Gasparov (Russian: Самве́л Влади́мирович Гаспа́ров; 7 June 1938 – 26 May 2020) was a Russian film director and short story writer. He worked for some time at the Odesa Film Studio. He was buried at Khovanskoye Cemetery.

== Career ==
Gasporov was one of the Russian filmmakers most interested in the Red Western form, having directed both Hatred and The Sixth One as well as the lesser known Bread, Gold and Pistol and Forget the Word "Death" in this genre.

== Personal life ==
At the time of his death, Gasparov was married to actress Natalya Vavilova and had a daughter from a previous marriage.

== Death ==
Gasparov died on 26 May 2020, at the age of 81, after contracting COVID-19 during the COVID-19 pandemic in Russia.

== Filmography ==
- 1975 – Hatred
- 1979 – Forget the Word "Death" (Zabud'te slovo "smert")
- 1980 – Bread, Gold and the Nagant revolver (Khleb, zoloto, nagan)
- 1981 – The Sixth
- 1983 – Bez osobogo riska
- 1985 – Coordinates of Death (Koordinaty smerti)
- 1987 – Kak doma, kak dela?
- 1990 – Stervyatniki na dorogakh
