= Ekaterina Klimova =

Russian film, theater and TV actress (born 1978)

- Екатерина Климова
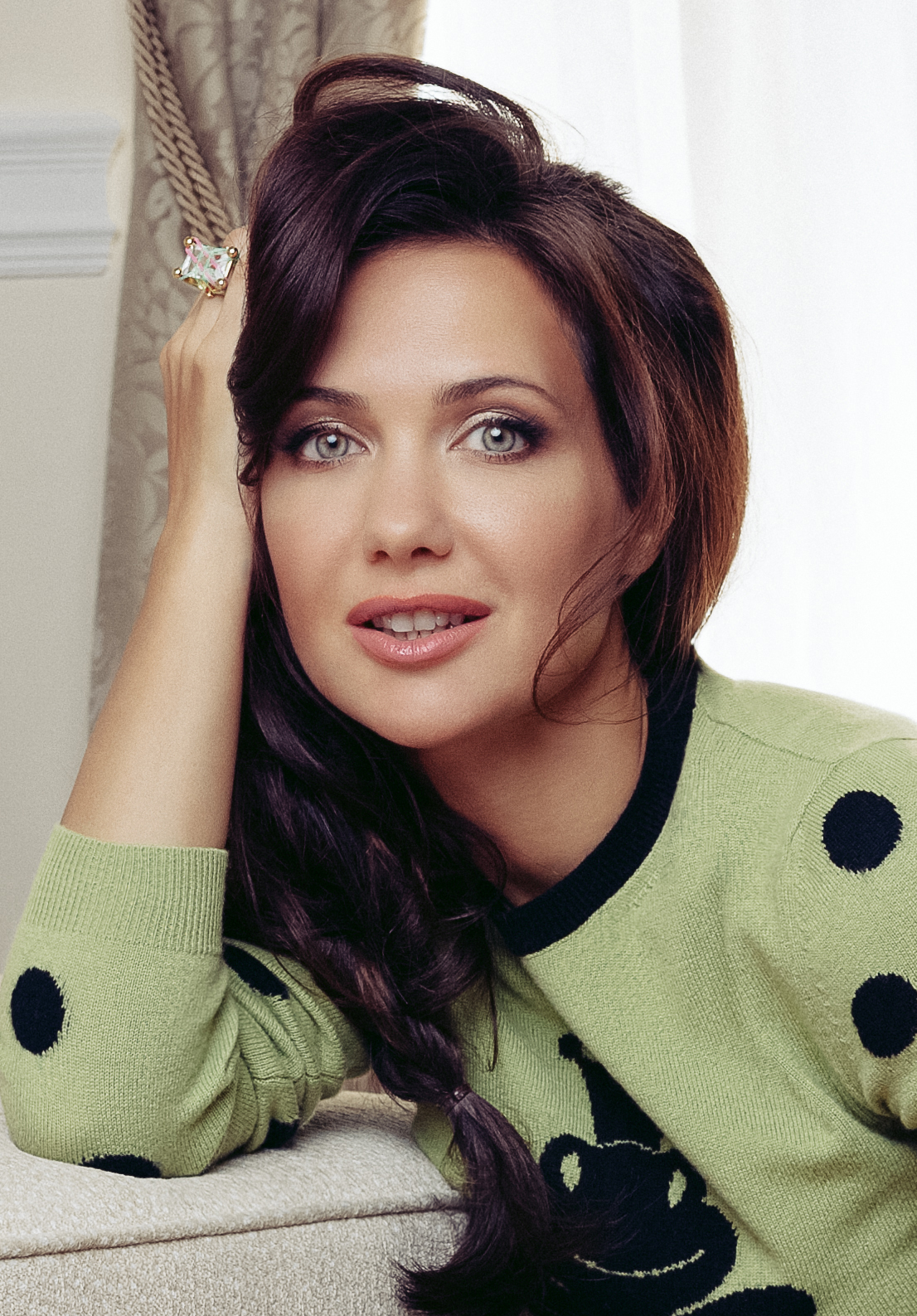
- Ekaterina Klimova in 2015
- Born: Ekaterina Aleksandrovna Klimova; January 24, 1978 (age 48); Moscow, RSFSR, USSR
- Education: Mikhail Shchepkin Higher Theatre School
- Occupation: Actress
- Years active: 1999–present
- Spouse(s): Ilya Khoroshilov (.... - 2004; 1 child); Igor Petrenko (2004 - 2014; 2 children); Gela Meskhi (2015 - 2019; 1 child)
- Children: 4
- Awards: Viktor Rozov Award; Best Actress Under Age 30

Ekaterina Aleksandrovna Klimova (Russian: Екатери́на Алекса́ндровна Кли́мова, born January 24, 1978) is a Russian film, theater and TV actress, who started her career in 1999. In 2002, she received the Viktor Rozov Award for the Best Actress Under Age 30. One of her notable roles is Dutchess Natalia Repnina in 2003 television series Poor Nastya.

== Biography ==
Klimova was born in Moscow, Russian SFSR, Soviet Union (now Russia). After high school, Catherine entered the preparatory courses in the Russian State Institute of VGIK. She graduated from the Mikhail Shchepkin Higher Theatre School with honors in 1999 (acting department, workshop of Nikolai Afonin).

== Personal life ==
First husband — Ilya Khoroshilov jeweler with whom Klimova had met while still a schoolgirl. The couple divorced in 2004. Daughter Liza Khoroshilova (born 2002).

Second husband — In 2004, she married Igor Petrenko. They have two sons together — Matvey Petrenko (born 2006) and Korney Petrenko (born 2008). Petrenko and Klimova divorced on July 10, 2014.

Third husband — on June 5, 2015, Ekaterina married a Russian actor Gela Meskhi, with whom she lived for some time in a civil marriage. They have one child together — daughter Bella Meskhi (born October 2015). They divorced on June 28, 2019.

== Selected filmography ==
=== Television ===
- Moskovskie okna (Russia, 2001) as Raisa
- Vremena ne vybirayut (Russia, 2001) as Inna Gavrushina
- Dalnobojshchiki (Russia, 2001) as prodavshchitsa na rynke
- Igry v podkindogo (Russia, 2001) as Sinya
- Ne pokidaj menya, lyubov (Russia, 2001) as Katja
- Luchshyj gorod Zemli (Russia, 2001)
- Bednaya Nastya (English title: Poor Nastya) (Russia, USA 2003–2004) as Natalia Alexandrovna Repnina
- Grehi otsov (Russia, 2004) as Katya Androsova
- Kamenskaya (Russia, 2005) as Julija Blohina
- Grozovye vorota (English title: The Storm Gate) (Russia, 2006) as Alina
- Moya Prechistenka (Russia, 2006) as Katja
- Pobochnyj ehffekt (Russia, 2008) as Svetlana
- Tihaya semejnaya zhizn (Russia, 2008) as Inessa
- Sil'naya slabaya zhenshchina (Russia, 2010)
- Pobeg (Russia, 2008) as Svetlana
- Vyhozhu tebya iskat (Russia, 2010)
- Tochka kipeniya (Russia, 2010) as Dasha Korshunova
- U kazhdogo svoya vojna (Russia, 2010)
- Vesna v dekabre (Ukraine, 2011)
- Odnazhdy v Rostove (Russia, 2011)
- Sindrom drakona (Russia, Ukraine 2011) as Evgenija Shchegoleva
- Grigoriy R. (Russia, 2014)
- Under Military Law (Russia, 2016) as Svetlana Yelagina
- You All Infuriate Me (Russia, 2017)

=== Films ===
- Poisons or the World History of Poisoning (Яды, или Всемирная история отравлений, 2001) as Jeanne d'Albret
- Proshchaniye v iyune (Russia, 2003) as Tanya
- A poutru oni prosnulis (English title: And in the Morning They Woke Up)(Russia, 2003) as Ket
- Dvoe u elki, ne schitaya sobaki (Russia, 2005) as Sasha
- My iz budushchego (English title: Black Hunters) (Russia, 2008) as Nurse Nina
- Vtoroe dyhanie (Russia, 2005) as kapitan Bahteeva
- Vse ne sluchajno (Ukraine, 2008)
- Antikiller D.K: Ljubov bez pamjati (Russia, 2009) as Katja
- Pushken (Ukraine, 2009)
- Lyubov pod prikrytiem (Russia, 2010) as Tatiana
- My iz budushchego 2 (English title: Black Hunters 2) (Russia, 2010) as Nurse Nina
- Svidanie (Russia, 2010) as Anna Svetlova
- Fairytale.Is (Russia, 2011) as mama
- Love in Vegas (Russia-Ukraine, 2014) as Anna
- Yolki 6 as Kseniya Lastochkina (2017)
- Little Red Riding Hood (2022)

=== Herself ===
- Muz-TV Awards (Russia, 2006) as herself

== Awards ==
- Viktor Rozov Award "Crystal Rose" (2000) - Best Actress Under Age 30 for the role of Desdemona in theatre play Otello
- Medal "For strengthening military cooperation" (Ministry of Defence - 2008) - for role in the film "Second Wind"
- Annual award "Couple of the Year", nominated for "Harmony" (with Igor Petrenko, 2010)
