= Hatred (1977 film) =

1977 film

- Directed by: Samvel Gasparov
- Written by: Nikita Mikhalkov; Eduard Volodarsky
- Starring: Yevgeni Solyakov; Ivan Matskevich
- Cinematography: Eduard Timlin
- Music by: Yevgeni Stikhin
- Production company: Odessa Film Studio
- Release date: 1977
- Running time: 72 mins.
- Country: Soviet Union
- Language: Russian

Hatred (Russian: Ненaвисть, romanized: Nenavist) is a 1977 Soviet action adventure film directed by Samvel Gasparov.

== Plot ==
This drama explores the way that war tears families apart.

Hatred is set in a small village in the Ukraine, in which dying man Bulgya tries to reconcile his three estranged sons, who have been scattered by the Russian Civil War. The elder son, Stepan served with the White Army, the middle son Fyodor served with the Red Army while the youngest, Mitka left home with no allegiances and no idea where to go. Contrary to Bulgya's hopes, the reunion is a cool one.

When Bulgya dies, the brothers are drawn together. They bury their father and promptly leave the village. But as soon as they pass the gates, a band of horsemen in Red Army uniforms burst into the village, killing the villagers, and burning their homes. The brothers set off in pursuit without any idea of who they are chasing. They do not know if they are really Red Army officers or if they are White Guards in disguise. Eventually Stepan recognises a fellow soldier from the White Guards and realises his loyalties are divided. He tries to play both sides, first betraying his brothers to the White Guards, and then helping them to escape. Fyodor and Mitka take a White Colonel prisoner, and on his way from the estate, Stepan hears gunshots. Rushing off after them, he realises he has become a stranger to the Whites as well.
