= Volchok (film) =

- Directed by: Konstantin Smirnov
- Written by: Aleksey Bezenkov; Konstantin Smirnov; Kseniya Datnova; Vadim Golovanov
- Produced by: David Tsallaev; Taymuraz Badziev; Sergey Shishkin; Vyacheslav Dusmukhametov; Konstantin Smirnov; Yevgeny Kazakov; Kirill Balmin; Anna Velyaminova; Anna Rogozhina; Lyubov Sviblova
- Starring: Yevgeny Tkachuk; Mark-Malik Murashkin; Yulia Khlynina; Sergei Makovetsky; Daniil Vorobyov; Andrey Smolyakov
- Cinematography: Stepan Beshkurov
- Edited by: Azamat Ermatov; Aleksandr Pak
- Music by: Ryan Otter
- Production companies: MEM Cinema Production; Okko Studios; Russia-1; TNT; Cinema Fund; MAXIM Online; Around the World; Russian Traveler; Russian Radio
- Distributed by: Central Partnership
- Release date: December 4, 2025 (Russia)
- Running time: 123 minutes
- Country: Russia
- Language: Russian
- Budget: ₽350 million
- Box office: ₽400 million; $2 million

Volchok (Russian: Волчок) is a 2025 Russian adventure film written, produced, and directed by Konstantin Smirnov, set at the turn of the 19th and 20th centuries. The film stars Yevgeny Tkachuk as Tikhon Volchok and Mark-Malik Murashkin as Vanya Ogarev. The cast also includes Yulia Khlynina, Sergei Makovetsky, Daniil Vorobyov, and Andrey Smolyakov.

This film was theatrically released in Russia on December 4, 2025, by Central Partnership.

== Plot ==
The film is set in the Russian Empire. The turn of the 19th and 20th centuries. Thirteen-year-old nobleman and orphan Vanya Ogarev flees Moscow to Nizhny Novgorod, escaping assassins sent by his own uncle, who has decided to seize the boy's inheritance. For his protection, Vanya Ogarev hires a fist fighter named Volchok, who he happens to meet. Volchok must help Vanya Ogarev reach Nizhny Novgorod safe and sound, where his father's loyal friend awaits him. But the whole event is falling apart from the very beginning: the dreamer, aristocrat, and aesthete Vanya Ogarev and the uncouth, sullen man Volchok barely tolerate each other from the very beginning. A dangerous journey awaits them, one that will change them both forever.

== Cast ==
- Yevgeny Tkachuk as Tikhon Volchok
- Mark-Malik Murashkin as Vanya Ogarev
- Yulia Khlynina as Elza
- Sergei Makovetsky as Konstantin Tarasov
- Daniil Vorobyov as Vesnitsky, Vanya Ogarev's uncle
- Mikhail Evlanov as Vozha, a bandit
- Andrey Pynzaru as Boryan, a bandit
- Kirill Polukhin as a bandit
- Andrey Smolyakov as Kretsch, a German baron
- Yuri Loparev as Prokhor, a servant in Vanya Ogarev's house

== Production ==
The adventure film Volchok was produced by MEM Cinema Production, known for such projects as Buy Me and Serf. The online cinema Okko also collaborated on the film, and Central Partnership served as the distributor.

=== Casting ===
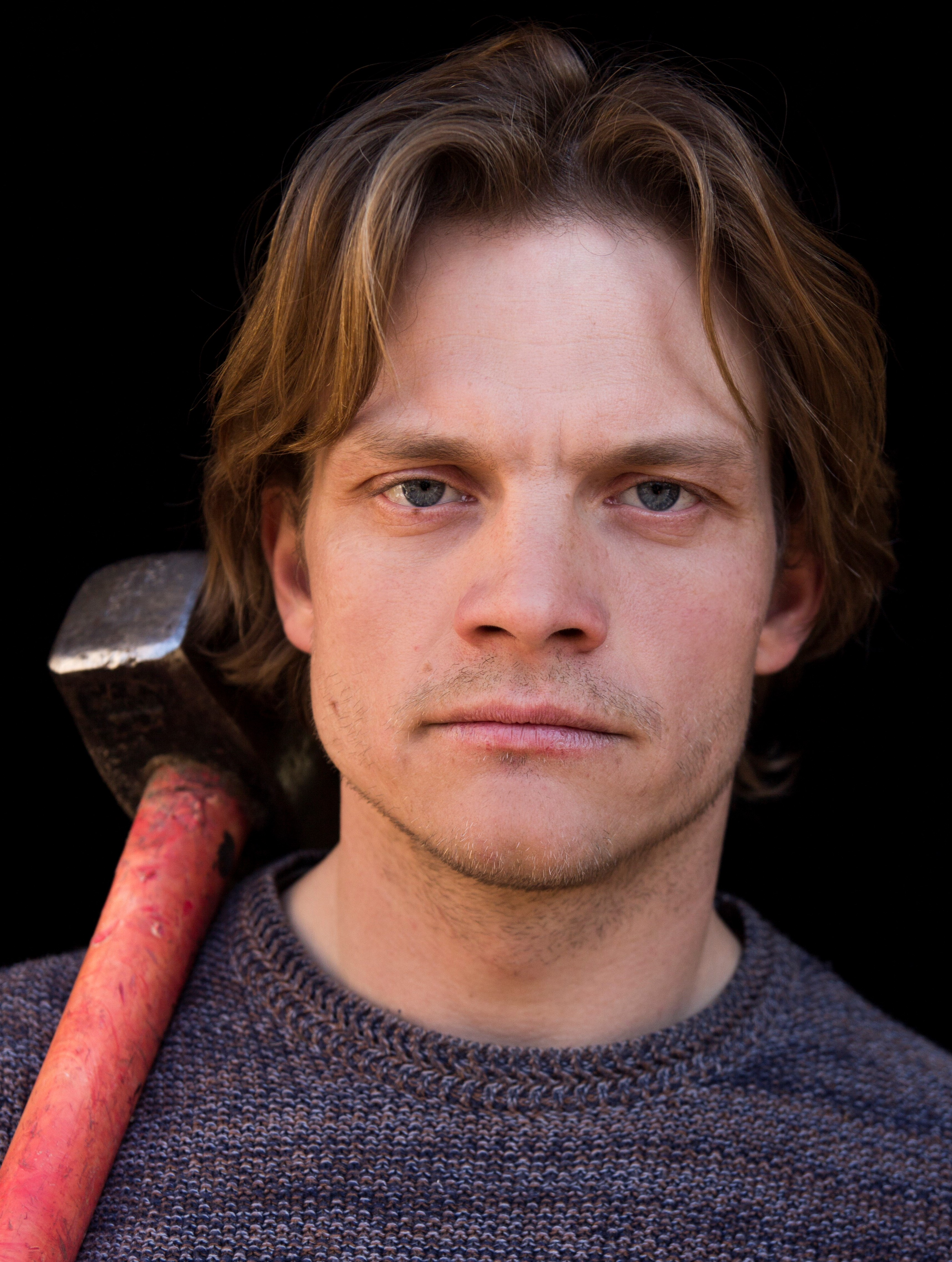
Yevgeny Tkachuk as Tikhon Volchok

The filmmakers considered several potential actors for the lead role of Tikhon Volchok, including Yura Borisov and Mikhail Kremer. However, the role ultimately went to Yevgeny Tkachuk, who admitted that such family stories had always interested him.

Tkachuk's co-star on the set was young actor Mark-Malik Murashkin, who played the orphaned nobleman Vanya Ogarev. Yulia Khlynina, Andrey Smolyakov, Sergei Makovetsky, Daniil Vorobyov, and others also joined the cast.

=== Filming ===
Principal photography launched in 2023. Filming locations included historical locations in Moscow, Saint Petersburg, Nizhny Novgorod, Kolomna (Moscow Oblast), and Rybinsk (Yaroslavl Oblast).

== Reception ==
On 24 August 2022, the project was presented at a Cinema Fund pitching event. The announced budget was 350 million rubles. The loan amount was 210 million.
