= Andrey Smolyakov =

Russian actor and director (born 1958)

- Андрей Смоляков
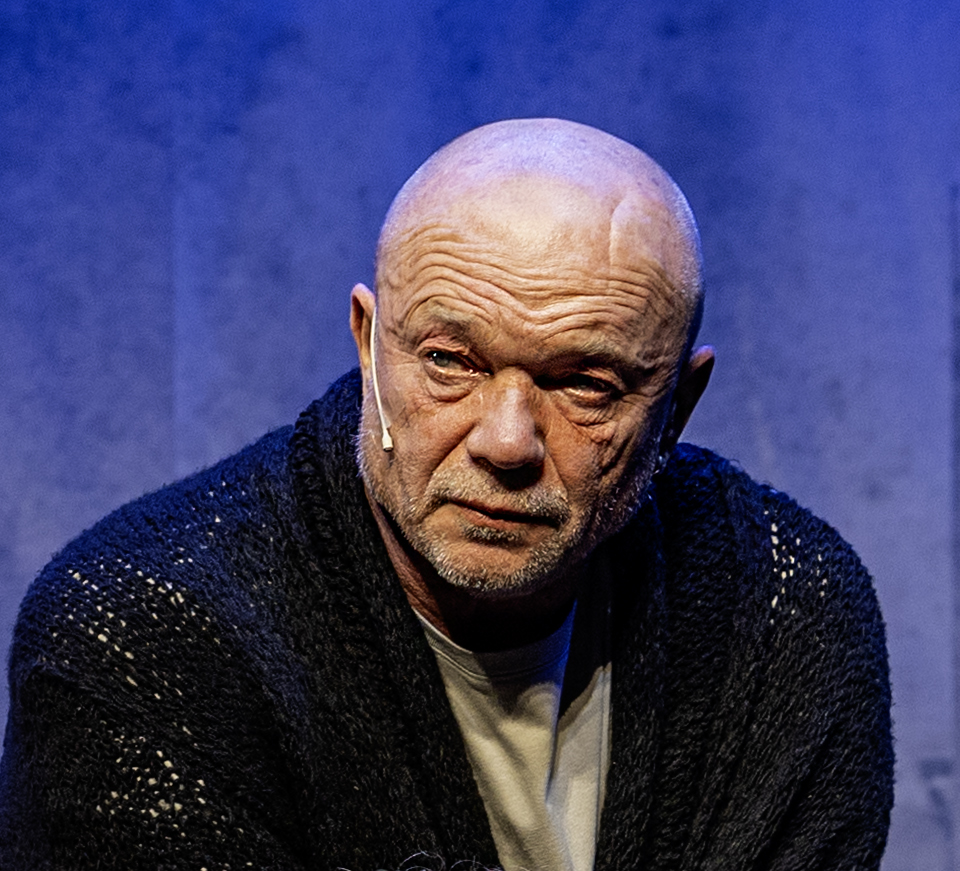
- Andrey Smolyakov in 2026
- Born: Andrey Igorevich Smolyakov; 24 November 1958 (age 67); Podolsk, Moscow Oblast, RSFSR, USSR
- Citizenship: Soviet Union; Russian
- Education: Russian Institute of Theatre Arts
- Occupation: Actor
- Years active: 1977-present

Andrey Igorevich Smolyakov (Russian: Андре́й И́горевич Смоляко́в; born 24 November 1958) is a Soviet and Russian actor and director. He is known for Vysotskiy. Spasibo, chto zhivoy (2011), Stalingrad, and Forbidden Empire.

== Life ==
Smolyakov was born in Podolsk, Moscow Oblast, Russian SFSR, Soviet Union as Andrey Igorevich Smolyakov. For three years he studied at Boris Shchukin Theatre Institute, but switched. In 1980 he graduated from the State Institute of Theatre Arts in a workshop under supervision of Oleg Tabakov. After graduation, he started working as actor on the stage of the Moscow Art Theatre. In 1984-1986 he was associated with the theater "Satirikon". In 1987 he joined the Moscow Studio Theatre Oleg Tabakov.

In 2004 he remarried to fashion designer Daria Razumikhina.

== Career ==
Smolyakov made his debut in the film Kiss Dawns (1977).

He played the title role in the playwright "Farewell, Mowgli!" based on The Jungle Book by Rudyard Kipling.

In 2000 he received the prize of the newspaper Moskovskij Komsomolets in the category "Best Actor" for his role as actor in the play The Lower Depths by Maxim Gorky.

In 2002 Andrey Smolyakov, received an award from the Stanislavsky International Fund as well as an award from the Moscow Expert Jury for his role as Brucson in Der Theatermacher, a playwright by Thomas Bernhard.

At the awards ceremony at Mosfilm Andrey Smolyakov was the winner of the Golden Eagle Award (Russia) for the best supporting actor in Vysotsky. Thank You For Being Alive as Viktor Bekhteev, a KGB Colonel in Uzbekistan, a drama film about Vladimir Vysotsky.

The Russian series Grigorii R, directed by Andrey Malyukov, began on Russian TV Monday 27 October 2014; with Vladimir Mashkov as Grigori Rasputin and Smolyakov as the investigator Smitten.

== Selected filmography ==
- Father Sergius (1978) as Alyosha
- Dawns Are Kissing (1978)
- Confrontation (1985) as the real Grigoriy Milinko
- Stalingrad (1989) - Leonid Khrushchev
- Hello, Fools! (1996) - Volodya, bodyguard
- Still Waters (2000) - Ivan Pavlovich, Kashtanov's assistant
- Daddy (2004) - Odintsov
- Children of the Arbat (2004) - Nikolai Yezhov
- Adjutants of Love (2005) - Charles Maurice de Talleyrand-Périgord
- Konservy (2007) - Petr Rodionov, FSB Colonel
- He Who Puts Out the Light (2008) - Nikolai Fyodorov
- Vysotsky. Thank You For Being Alive (2011) - Viktor Bekhteev, KGB Colonel in Uzbekistan
- Fairytale.Is (2011) - Evil Clown
- Stalingrad (2013) - Polyakov, sergeant artillery
- Viy (2014) - priest Paisiy
- Star (2014)
- Orlova and Alexandrov (2015) - Maxim Gorky
- Viking (2016) - Rogvolod
- Raid (2017) - Police officer Andrey Ryzhov
- Going Vertical (2017)
- Coach (2017) - father of Stoleshnikov
- The Factory (2018)
- Dead Lake (2019) - oligarch
- More volnuetsya raz (2021) - Old man
- Mira (2022) - Fomin
- Rowing for Gold (2025) - Ivan Kolosov
- Volchok (2025)
