= White Explosion =

- Russian: Белый взрыв
- Directed by: Stanislav Govorukhin
- Written by: Stanislav Govorukhin; Eduard Volodarsky
- Starring: Sergey Nikonenko; Lyudmila Gurchenko; Anatoliy Ignatyev; Armen Dzhigarkhanyan; Fyodor Odinokov; Leo Pilpani
- Cinematography: Vasili Kirbizhekov
- Edited by: Valentina Oleynik
- Music by: Sofiya Gubaydulina
- Release date: 1969
- Country: Soviet Union
- Language: Russian

White Explosion (Russian: Белый взрыв) is a 1969 Soviet historical action war film directed by Stanislav Govorukhin.

The film takes place in 1942, when Soviet climbers saved the inhabitants of the Caucasus foothills by sacrificing themselves.

== Plot ==
In 1942, during the Great Patriotic War, the soldiers of the Third Reich's Edelweiss mountain division occupy a strategic position in the Caucasus mountains, from which they fire on Soviet refugees and wounded Red Army soldiers crossing the ridge.

Lieutenant Artem Arsenov (Armen Dzhigarkhanyan) devises a daring plan to climb to the summit and detonate the snow cap, triggering an avalanche to strike the German positions. He had unsuccessfully attempted to conquer this peak even before the war, in 1940. For the mission, he assembles a group of six people, including both experienced mountaineers and novices.

The group reaches the summit with heavy losses and completes the task. The Red Army forces begin to move through the now-cleared pass.

== Cast ==
- Sergey Nikonenko as Kolya Spichkin (as S. Nikonenko)
- Lyudmila Gurchenko as Vera Arsenova (as L. Gurchenko)
- Anatoliy Ignatyev as Vadim Baranov (as A. Ignatyev)
- Armen Dzhigarkhanyan as Artyom Arsenov (as A. Dzhigarkhanyan)
- Fyodor Odinokov as Semyon Ivanovich (as F. Odinokov)
- Leo Pilpani as Shota Iliani (as L. Pilpani)
- Bukhuti Zakariadze as Tengiz Aleksandrovich (as B. Zakariadze)
- Stepan Krylov
- Nikolai Fyodortsov
- A. Ivanov
