= The Second Attempt of Viktor Krokhin =

- Russian: Вторая попытка Виктора Крохина
- Directed by: Igor Sheshukov
- Written by: Eduard Volodarsky
- Starring: Aleksandr Kharashkevich; Viktor Poluyektov; Lyudmila Gurchenko; Nikolay Rybnikov; Oleg Borisov
- Cinematography: Vladimir Burykin
- Music by: Vadim Bibergan
- Release date: 1977
- Country: Soviet Union
- Language: Russian

The Second Attempt of Viktor Krokhin (Russian: Вторая попытка Виктора Крохина) is a 1977 Soviet sports film directed by Igor Sheshukov.

Although produced in 1977, the film was only released in 1987.

== Plot ==
The film tells about a boy named Vitya, who grew up without a father, something that was not uncommon in the immediate post-war years in the Soviet Union. He learned to fight and eventually became a boxer, and took part in the European Championship.

== Cast ==
- Aleksandr Kharashkevich
- Viktor Poluyektov
- Lyudmila Gurchenko
- Nikolay Rybnikov
- Oleg Borisov
- Mikhail Terentyev
- Vladimir Zamanskiy
- Lev Lemke
- Ivan Bortnik
- Antonina Bogdanova
