= Eduard Volodarsky =

- Born: Eduard Yakovlevich Volodarsky; 3 February 1941; Kharkov, Ukrainian SSR, USSR
- Died: 8 October 2012 (aged 71); Moscow, Russia
- Occupations: Screenwriter, writer, playwright
- Known for: At Home Among Strangers (1974); My Friend Ivan Lapshin (1984)

Eduard Yakovlevich Volodarsky (Russian: Эдуард Яковлевич Володарский; 3 February 1941 – 8 October 2012) was a Soviet and Russian screenwriter, writer and playwright. He was named Honoured Artist of the RSFSR in 1987, awarded the Order of Honour in 2002 and 4th class Order "For Merit to the Fatherland" in 2011 for his contribution to the development of national cinema.

== Biography ==
Eduard Volodarsky was born in Kharkov (today's Kharkiv, Ukraine) to a Russian mother and a Jewish father who had recently graduated from a technical university. His mother Maria Yakovlevna Brigova came from peasants of the Oryol Governorate. With the start of the Great Patriotic War they were evacuated to Aktyubinsk, Kazakh SSR. Eduard never knew his father, Yakov Isaakovich Volodarsky, who was killed at front. His mother served as an NKVD investigator and married an NKVD officer. In 1947 the family moved to Moscow. Eduard didn't get along with his stepfather and spent his free time in the streets with hooligans. That's when he met Vladimir Vysotsky, who became his best friend.

Volodarsky was baptized at the age of six under the Fyodor name and remained in the Russian Orthodox Church for the rest of his life. He started writing stories and poetry at school. Upon graduation he tried to enter the MSU Faculty of Geology, but failed and joined a geological expedition. He spent some years working as a driller at the Russian North. At one point he sent his stories to the contest organized by the VGIK Screenwriting Faculty and received an invitation. In 1962 he returned to Moscow and passed the entering exams, but was expelled in 1.5 years for a restaurant fight. Volodarsky was later restored and in 1968 finished Yevgeny Gabrilovich's course. He quickly turned into one of the most prolific Soviet screenwriters, often producing 3–5 screenplays per year (over 80 screenplays in total).

In 1971, Aleksei German directed Trial of the Road adapted from Volodarsky's screenplay which was, in turn, based on Yuri German's novel. The story touched a controversial theme of a Nazi collaborator who wanted to join Soviet partisans and was put to the test. The role had been written with Vysotsky in mind, but German rejected him. Despite getting approval from influential people like Konstantin Simonov, it was labelled as "anti-Soviet" by Mikhail Suslov. Described as "deforming the image of the heroic time, of Soviet people who stood up to fight German fascists on the occupied territories", it was banned for 15 years and released only in 1986. The film crew was awarded the USSR State Prize for it in 1988. Same happened to My Friend Ivan Lapshin which was shelved for three years and then awarded the Vasilyev Brothers State Prize of the RSFSR.

In 1974, Nikita Mikhalkov made his directorial debut with At Home Among Strangers, a Red Western about a group of friends – former Red Army soldiers, now Chekists – who investigated a train robbery, resulting in a heist reminiscent of the Great Train Robbery. It was based on the Red Gold novel by Mikhalkov and Volodarsky. Full of symbolism and innovative filming techniques, it quickly turned into a cult classic, bolstering the career of the young director.

Volodarsky also experienced a successful theatre career after rewriting his early unfilmed screenplay into the Our Debts play. Staged by Oleg Yefremov at the Moscow Art Theatre, it drew a full house for 10 years straight and was eventually adapted into a movie. According to Volodarsky, at the time his plays were staged all over the USSR and he earned 4000 rubles monthly, which was five times more than a minister's salary, yet he and Vysotsky spent all money on booze. During late 1980s he began writing historical and biographical novels; some of them were also made into TV series. He was among the few Soviet screenwriters still in great demand after the dissolution of the Soviet Union.

Among his last works was a TV adaptation of Vasily Grossman's Life and Fate novel released posthumously. In the interview that preceded the premiere Volodarsky described Grossman as a "rotten writer who didn't love the country he lived in" and stated that he read the novel only after signing the contract. He also self-identified as a monarchist and a White movement supporter while criticizing democracy and anti-communists, Soviet dissidents in particular for being "enemies of their own country... lying too much".

Eduard Volodarsky died on 8 October 2012 in his Moscow flat aged 71. He had no health problems according to his widow – his heart simply stopped. He was buried at the Vagankovo Cemetery. Volodarsky was survived by his wife Farida Abdurrahmanovna Volodarskaya (née Tagirova, born 1939). They met as VGIK students and spent over 40 years together, yet they left no children.

== Selected filmography ==
- 1969 – White Explosion
- 1971 – Trial on the Road (released in 1986)
- 1974 – At Home Among Strangers
- 1974 – The Second Attempt of Viktor Krokhin
- 1977 – Hatred
- 1978 – Pugachev
- 1983 – Demidovs
- 1985 – My Friend Ivan Lapshin
- 1987 – Moonzund
- 1989–1990 – War on the Western Front (TV series)
- 1991 – To the Last Limit
- 1993 – Trotsky
- 1995 – Lonely Gambler
- 2000 – Ordinary Bolshevism (documentary)
- 2002 – Diary of a Kamikaze
- 2003 – The Fifth Angel (TV series)
- 2003 – Bayazıt (TV series)
- 2004 – The Penal Battalion (TV series)
- 2006 – Stolypin... Unlearned Lessons (TV series)
- 2007 – Russian Translation (TV series)
- 2008 – Black Hunters
- 2008 – Dark Planet
- 2009 – Wolf Messing: Who Saw through Time (TV series)
- 2011 — Dostoevsky (TV series)
- 2011 — Burnt by the Sun 2: The Citadel
- 2012 – Life and Fate (TV series)
- 2013 – Pyotr Leschenko. Everything That Was... (TV series)
- 2013 – Vasiliy Stalin (TV series)
- 2014 – Grigoriy R. (TV series)
- 2017 – Demon of the Revolution (TV series, based on the novel)
