= Major of State Security =

Major of State Security was a special rank of officers of the commanding staff of the People's Commissariat of Internal Affairs and the People's Commissariat of State Security of the Soviet Union in the period 1935–1945 (except for the military personnel of the troops of the People's Commissariat of Internal Affairs and employees of the Workers' and Peasants' Militia of the People's Commissariat of Internal Affairs of the Soviet Union). The lower special rank is the Captain of State Security, the next in rank is the Senior Major of State Security (until 1943).

The special rank of Major in State Security (1 diamond in the collar tabs of the 1937–1943 model ) in this period conditionally corresponded to the military rank of the Commander of the Brigade of the Workers' and Peasants' Red Army, after 1943 – conditionally corresponded to the military rank of major.

== Rank history ==
	1936	1937	
	Tunic, French, raincoat and raglan coat	Tunic, French	Cloak, overcoat
Buttonholes			
Sleeve insignia			

The special rank of Major of State Security was introduced by Decisions of the Central Executive Committee of the Soviet Union No. 20 and the Council of People's Commissars of the Soviet Union No. 2256 of October 7, 1935, announced by Order of the People's Commissariat of Internal Affairs of the Soviet Union No. 319 of October 10, 1935 for the commanding staff of the Main Directorate of the State Security of the People's Commissariat of Internal Affairs of the Soviet Union.

By the Decree of the Presidium of the Supreme Soviet of the Soviet Union of February 9, 1943, introducing special ranks of employees of the People's Commissariat of Internal Affairs, similar to general military, the rank of Major of State Security was transferred to the category of special ranks of senior command personnel, and conditionally equated to the military rank of Major of the Workers' and Peasants' Red Army (before that it conditionally corresponded to the military rank of the highest command personnel of the Workers' and Peasants' Red Army – Brigade Commander).

By the Decree of the Presidium of the Supreme Soviet of the Soviet Union of July 6, 1945, introducing military ranks for employees of the organs of the People's Commissariat of Internal Affairs and the People's Commissariat for State Security of the Soviet Union, similar to combined arms, the rank of major of state security was abolished.

== Insignia ==
Orders No. 396 (for the Main Directorate of State Security) and No. 399 (for the Main Directorate of Border and Internal Security) dated December 27, 1935: one red cloth star with a gold rim on both sleeves; buttonholes – with a golden gap. From April 30, 1936 – an additional yellow metal star was installed on the buttonholes.

By Order of the People's Commissariat of Internal Affairs No. 278 of July 15, 1937: the insignia of the Major of State Security – one diamond in the buttonholes.

By Order of the People's Commissariat of Internal Affairs No. 126 of February 18, 1943, in accordance with the Decree of the Presidium of the Supreme Soviet of the Soviet Union "On the Introduction Of New Insignia For the Personnel Of the Organs And Troops Of the People's Commissariat of Internal Affairs" of February 9, 1943, instead of the existing buttonholes were introduced new insignia – shoulder straps, and also approved the rules for wearing uniforms by personnel of the organs and troops of the People's Commissariat of Internal Affairs of the Soviet Union.

== Personalities ==
- Zinovy Ushakov

== Sources ==
- Decree of the Presidium of the Supreme Soviet of the Soviet Union "On the Ranks, Uniforms and Insignia of the Commanding Staff of the People's Commissariat of Internal Affairs and the People's Commissariat for State Security of the Soviet Union" dated July 6, 1945
