= Andrey Malyukov =

Russian film director, screenwriter, and producer (1948–2021)

Andrei Malyukov
- Born: Andrei Igoryevich Malyukov; 6 January 1948; Novosibirsk, Russian SFSR, Soviet Union
- Died: 19 December 2021 (aged 73); Moscow, Russia
- Occupations: film director, screenwriter, producer
- Years active: 1964–2021

Andrei Igoryevich Malyukov (Russian: Андрей Игоревич Малюков; 6 January 1948 – 19 December 2021) was a Soviet and Russian film director, screenwriter and producer. He was a laureate of the Vasilyev Brothers State Prize of the RSFSR (1980) and People's Artist of the Russian Federation (2004).

Malyukov died of COVID-19 in Moscow on 19 December 2021, at the age of 73.
