= Sergei Nikonenko =

Russian actor (born 1941)

- Сергей Никоненко
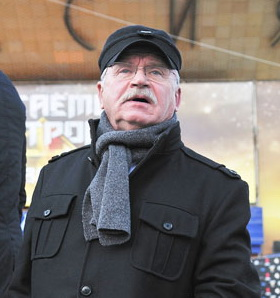
- Nikonenko in 2009
- Born: April 16, 1941 (age 85)
- Education: Gerasimov Institute of Cinematography
- Occupations: actor, film director, screenwriter
- Years active: 1958-present
- Employer: National Film Actors' Theatre

Sergei Petrovich Nikonenko (Russian: Серге́й Петрович Никоненко; born 16 April 1941 in Moscow) is a Soviet and Russian actor, a film director and a screenwriter. He was awarded with People's Artist of the RSFSR (1991).

He performed in more than eighty films since 1961. He studied at the Gerasimov Institute of Cinematography. He worked at the National Film Actors' Theatre.

== Selected filmography ==
- 1967
  - The Red and the White (Звёзды и солдаты) as Cossack Officer
  - The Journalist (Журналист) as Reutov
- 1969 White Explosion (Белый взрыв) as Kolya Spichkin
- 1970 Crime and Punishment (Преступление и наказание) as Nikolai
- 1972 Liberation (Освобождение) as Sashka Golubev
- 1973 The Sky Is Beyond the Clouds (За облаками — небо)
- 1974 Birds over the City (Птицы над городом) as Vishnyakov
- 1977 An Unfinished Piece for Mechanical Piano (Неоконченная пьеса для механического пианино) as Yashka, the footman
- 1978 Father Sergius (Отец Сергий) as episode
- 1979 The Theme (Тема) as Sinitsyn
- 1980 Do Not Part with Your Beloved (С любимыми не расставайтесь) as Shumilov
- 1981 Gipsy Happiness
- 1984 Planet Parade (Парад планет) as Vasily Afonin
- 1985 Winter Evening in Gagra (Зимний вечер в Гаграх) as Valentin Fomenko, choreographer
- 1987
  - Tomorrow Was the War (Завтра была война) as school director
  - Lilac Ball (Лиловый шар) as Horse-eater
- 1988 Tree Sticks! (Ёлки-палки!) as Nikolai Nikolayevich Knyazev
- 1989
  - Stalingrad (Сталинград) as General Aleksandr Rodimtsev
  - The Feasts of Belshazzar, or a Night with Stalin (Пиры Валтасара, или Ночь со Сталиным) as Kliment Voroshilov
- 1991 Viva Gardes-Marines! (Виват, гардемарины!) as Count Piotr Grigoryevich Chernyshev
- 1992 Encore, Once More Encore! (Анкор, еще анкор!) as Ivan Kryukov
- 1994 The Master and Margarita (Мастер и Маргарита) as Stepan Bogdanovich Likhodeev
- 1998 Composition for Victory Day (Сочинение ко Дню Победы) as Nechiporenko
- 1998 Classic (Классик) as Gorsky
- 2003 And in the Morning They Woke Up (А поутру они проснулись)
- 2005 The Fall of the Empire (Гибель империи) as Paul von Rennenkampf
- 2006 Soviet Park (Парк советского периода) as Divisional Commander Chapayev
- 2009 Attack on Leningrad (Ленинград) as captain of artillery
- 2010 What Men Talk About (О чём говорят мужчины) as captain of the ship
- 2018 The Crimean Bridge. Made with Love! (Крымский мост. Сделано с любовью!) as Talib Nazirovich
- 2021 The Crying Steppe as Filipp Goloshchyokin

== Honours and awards ==
- Order of the Badge of Honour (1971)
- Honored Artist of the RSFSR (1974)
- Lenin Komsomol Prize (1976) – the incarnation of images in contemporary cinema
- People's Artist of the RSFSR (1991) – for his contribution in the development of Soviet cinema
- Prize at the Constellation / Sozvezdie film festival in Tver (1999) for the best male lead in "Classic"
- Order "For Merit to the Fatherland", 4th class (2001) – for outstanding contribution to the development of national cinema
- Main prize of the International Short Film Festival Oberhausen for the best diploma director's work - the movie "Petruhina name"
- International literary award named after Sergei Yesenin "On Russia, wave your wings ..." in the "Film, Theatre, Television" (2010)
- Order of Honour (2011) – for outstanding contribution to the development of national cinema
- Order of Alexander Nevsky (2017) – for great contribution to the development of national culture and art, media, and many years of fruitful activity
- Stanislavsky Award (2021) – for conquering the heights of acting and loyalty to the principles of the school of K. S. Stanislavski
