= Mark Drobot =

Ukrainian actor

Mark Vladimirovich Drobot (August 29, 1986, Kyiv, Ukraine) is a Ukrainian actor.

== Biography ==
Mark Drobot was born on August 27, 1986, in Kiev. In 2010 he graduated from the Kiev Theater Institute. Karpenko-Kary.

Since 2005, he has been working at the Kiev Academic Young Theater.

In 2015, for the role of Wurm in the play "Cunning and Love," Mark Drobot won the "Kyiv Pectoral" award in the nomination "For the best performance of the male role of the second plan."

2019, March 26 - Honored Artist of Ukraine - for significant personal contribution to the development of national culture and theater arts, notable creative achievements, and high professional skills[2].

== Successful Movies Mark ==
Mark Drobot starred in about 30 films. Among the most successful - Central Hospital, Mistress and Kiev cake.

Central Hospital (2015) - a series about human relations framed by medical problems. A talented surgeon Rustam (actor Ahtem Seitablayev arrives at the central hospital of the provincial city where a young, beautiful and strong-willed woman, Margarita Sergeevna (actress Olga Grishina, works as one of the leading surgeons). Margarita and Rustam associate a long-standing romance with student days. Feelings between old lovers flare up with renewed vigor, and Margarita Sergeyevna faces a difficult choice - to forgive or not to love her life.

Hostess (2016) 1 + 1 Production drama, which tells the story of the inhabitants of the provincial city of Anikanov, led by a strong and manic obsessed with the mistress of the Almaznaya mine Alina Khmelevskaya.

Kiev Cake (2014) - a series in which the story comes to Kiev provincial from Gaisin. The capital of Ukraine becomes for the young girl a transit point on the way to its goal - America, where they opened a "green card". Only 20 hours of waiting for the plane separate it from a dream. But at the station she meets two young people who draw her into a series of adventurous and romantic adventures. With Mark Drobot on the set also played a popular leading 1 + 1 Yuri Gorbunov.

== Theater work ==
- Graziano – W. Shakespeare, Satisfaction» (The Merchant of Venice)
- Armand – J. Anouilh, Colombe
- Anton Kvitka – M. Starytsky, Talent
- Ignacio – A. B. Vallejo, En la ardiente oscuridad
- Prince – L.Razumovskaya The Little Mermaid
- Zerbino – V. Glazer The Seven Desires of Zerbino
- Servant – Friedrich Schiller In my end is my beginning (Maria Stewart)

== Awards ==
2019, March 26 - Merited Artist of Ukraine — for significant personal contribution to the development of national culture and theater arts, notable creative achievements, and high professional skills.
