= Yakov Novichenko =

Soviet military officer (1914–1994)

Yakov Tikhonovich Novichenko Яков Тихонович Новиченко
- Born: 28 April 1914; Travnoye, Tomsk Governorate, Russian Empire
- Died: 8 December 1994 (aged 80); Travnoye, Novosibirsk Oblast, Russia
- Alma mater: Novosibirsk State Agricultural University
- Children: 6
- Military career
- Allegiance: Soviet Union
- Service years: 1938–1946
- Rank: Junior lieutenant
- Nickname: The Internationalist Warrior (Korean: 국제주의전사)
- Known for: Protecting Kim Il Sung from a grenade
- Conflicts: Battles of Khalkhin Gol; World War II; Soviet–Japanese War
- Awards: Hero of Labor; Order of the Red Banner

Yakov Tikhonovich Novichenko (Russian: Яков Тихонович Новиченко; 28 April 1914 – 8 December 1994) was a Soviet military officer. He notably protected Kim Il Sung, the first leader of North Korea, from an assassination attempt in 1946. He is considered the only non-Korean to have had a cult of personality in the country, and is the only non-Korean to have received the Hero of Labor award, the highest title in North Korea.

Novichenko served in the Red Army beginning in 1938, and participated in the Soviet–Japanese War. After the end of World War II, he was stationed in Pyongyang.

During a rally in Pyongyang on 1 May 1946, Novichenko intercepted a grenade thrown at Kim Il Sung and other bystanders. The grenade was allegedly thrown by a member of the Korean anti-communist terrorist group the White Shirts Society. Novichenko narrowly survived, suffering severe wounds and the loss of his right hand and forearm. He was promised the prestigious Hero of the Soviet Union award by his commanding officer, but never ended up receiving it, which later caused him to be ridiculed by his neighbors. He was discharged from the army after his recovery, and returned home to a life of farming and skilled labor.

For the next nearly four decades, Kim sent Novichenko letters and gifts and spoke of Novichenko glowingly at his meetings with the Soviets. However, Novichenko was relatively unknown in both the Soviet Union and North Korea, possibly in part due to poor Soviet-North Korean relations. But in 1984, after Kim prominently visited Novichenko and presented him with the Hero of Labor award, a cult of personality was developed around him in North Korea. A statue of him was made and displayed in Pyongyang, and he even had a Soviet-North Korean film made about him: One Second for a Feat, released in 1985. From that year onwards, Novichenko and his family were regularly invited to North Korea. Even after Novichenko's death in 1994, the Kim family continued paying their respects to him and inviting his descendants to the country.

== Early life and career ==
Yakov Tikhonovich Novichenko was born on 28 April 1914 in the village of Travnoye, Tomsk Governorate, Russian Empire. He was born into a family of Ukrainian immigrants. His father died in World War I and his mother died when he was seven years old, which left him an orphan. He then went to live with his uncle.

He worked various jobs in his youth, including as a shepherd and as a laborer for the Turkestan–Siberia Railway, where he encountered the conflict with the Basmachi movement. He later worked on a kolkhoz (collective farm) after the founding of the Soviet Union.

== Military career ==
In 1938, he was drafted into the Red Army. He graduated from an infantry school in Komsomolsk-on-Amur and participated in the Battles of Khalkhin Gol. When the Soviet Union entered World War II, he made a number of requests to transfer to the western front, but was denied. He entered officer training and became a junior lieutenant in 1944. He then served in the Soviet–Japanese War, including in efforts to take parts of Korea from Japanese rule during the last few weeks of World War II. He was subsequently stationed in Pyongyang to assist in the Soviet military government in the North.

=== Protecting Kim Il Sung ===
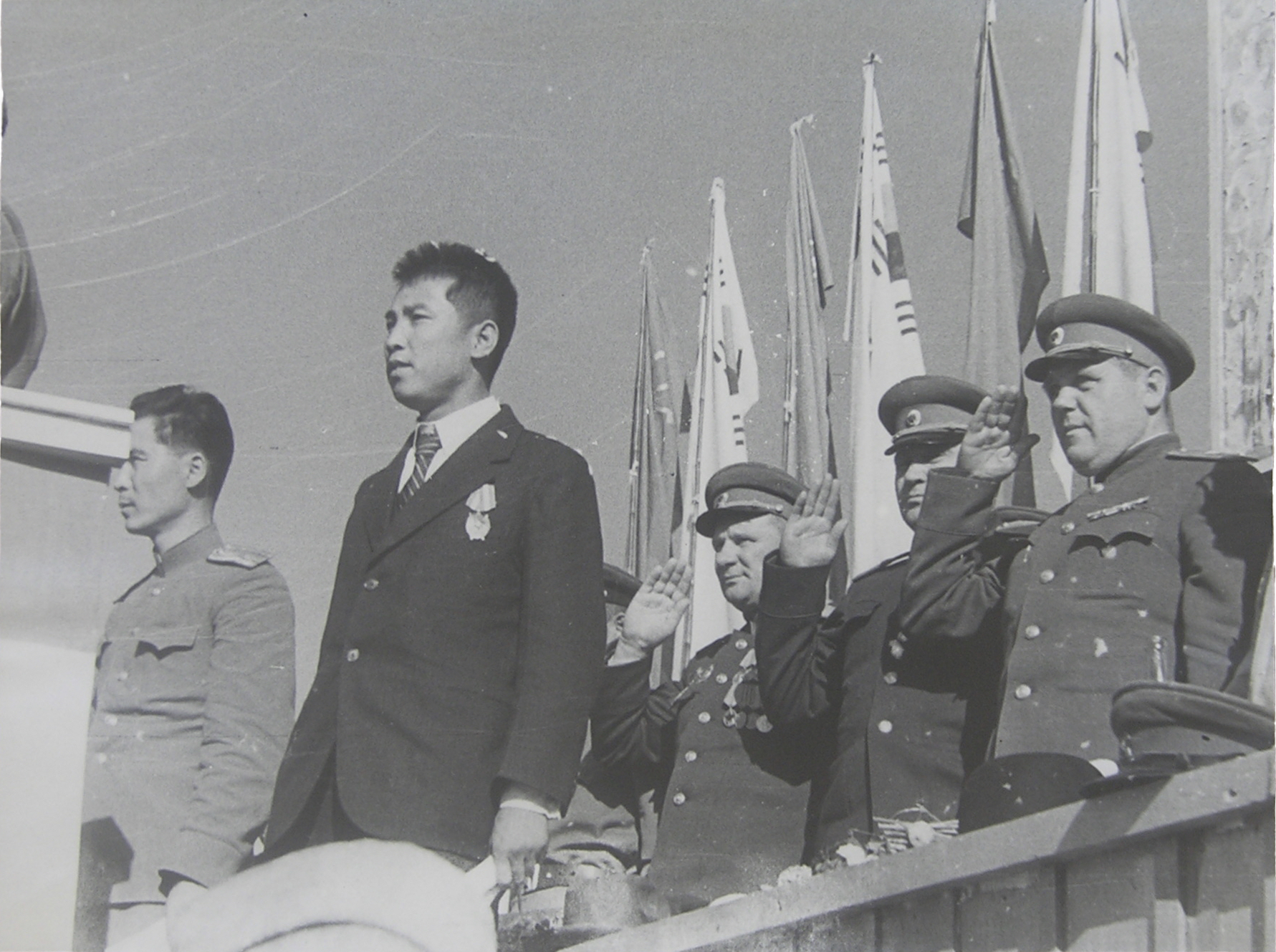
Kim Il Sung (second from left) in 1945

On 1 May 1946, Novichenko commanded a Soviet platoon tasked with guarding Kim and maintaining order at a large North Korean rally. Kim Il Sung was to give a speech outside Pyongyang station to commemorate the anniversary of the March 1st Movement. Novichenko had been on location well before the actual rally, so he sat on the stairs of the stage, reading a thick book. When work picked up, he tucked the book into his belt. According to a Soviet eyewitness Ivan Boluchevsky, (Note: Иван Болучевский) near the end of the rally, a group of students inconspicuously approached the podium. (Note: Boluchevsky erroneously recalls the date as 15 March.) According to another Soviet eyewitness, Novichenko began arguing with one of the young men over whether the man could sit on the stairs leading up to the stage. The man, later alleged to be 19-year-old Kim Hyeong-jip and a member of the White Shirts Society, (Note: Korean: 김형집) threw a homemade grenade at Kim. The grenade fell short of Kim and landed on the stairs to the platform he was on. According to a later account by Leonid Vasin, the grenade landed about 100 ft (30 m) to the right of Kim, and posed little direct threat to him. Novichenko rushed over and grabbed the grenade with his right hand.

According to most accounts, because Novichenko was surrounded by people, he ducked down and pressed the grenade under his stomach, using his own body to absorb the blast. Someone yelled "Novichenko, throw it!", (Note: «Новиченко, бросай её!») but he decided against it and ducked down. According to Kim Sae-il, (Note: 김세일) a Soviet-aligned Korean eyewitness reporter who recounted the story for the South Korean newspaper JoongAng Ilbo, Novichenko moved to throw the grenade elsewhere but it exploded soon after he picked it up. A North Korean defector writing for the US-funded Radio Free Asia also claims Novichenko attempted to throw the grenade.

Novichenko's body was mutilated, and bystanders were unsure of whether he had survived.

==== Aftermath ====
The crowd scattered and officials ducked for cover. According to a Russian source, Kim and the other bystanders were uninjured, and Kim continued his speech. According to Kim Sae-il, Kim Il Sung did not continue his speech and was promptly escorted by a Soviet military car away from the venue; later a moderator announced by microphone what had happened and coordinated the exit of the crowd. Soviet soldiers managed to apprehend the attacker on the scene, among around 40 youth suspects.

Novichenko was lifted onto a stretcher and taken by car to a nearby hospital. Elizaveta Bogdanova, (Note: Елизавета Богданова) supervisor of medical services at the hospital at the time, later recalled his condition: (Note: «Перед нами был совершенно изуродованный человек, у которого ничего живого не осталось. Оторвана правая рука, многочисленные повреждения грудной клетки»)

Before us is a completely mutilated man, with not a single part left untouched. His right hand had been torn off and he had multiple chest injuries.

He was given a glass of vodka as an anesthetic for surgery to remove shrapnel from his body. After the operation, a surgeon told Novichenko: (Note: «Скажи спасибо книге - это она тебя спасла, - сообщит ему госпитальный хирург. - Если бы не она, не потребовалось бы никакого хирургического вмешательства.»)

Give your thanks to the book, it saved your life. If you didn't have the book, surgical intervention would have been unnecessary.

The book he had tucked into his belt, a 400-page tome on the Brusilov offensive by Sergei Sergeyev-Tsensky, had protected his heart from the shrapnel. (Note: Most sources say the book has 600 pages. Yuri Plotnikov of the Science in Siberia newspaper claimed in 2014 to be personally familiar with the exact edition Novichenko had, which contained two other books from Sergeyev-Tsensky. He said it had 800 pages. However, a 1944 edition of the book that contains all three books mentioned by Plotnikov is consistently listed as having 400 pages online.) However, the explosion had torn off his right hand and his right arm had to be amputated at the elbow. He also had broken ribs, and suffered severe damage to his toes. According to a contemporary hospital note, his left eye had been knocked out of his head. According to Novichenko's daughter, a piece of shrapnel had pierced his left eye.

Novichenko spent two months in the hospital recovering. Kim sent North Korean officials to the hospital on a number of occasions to monitor Novichenko's recovery. Kim also sent Novichenko a silver cigarette case inscribed with the text: "To the hero of March 1st, Novichenko. From the Chairman of the People's Committee of the DPRK, Kim Il Sung". (Note: «Герою 1 марта Новиченко. От председателя временного народного комитета Северной Кореи Ким Ир Сена») According to Novichenko, the first person to visit him in the hospital was Kim's wife, Kim Jong-suk, who brought him food she had personally prepared. He was also reportedly sent numerous gifts from grateful Koreans, including fruits, ginseng, flowers, and sweets.

While Novichenko was in the hospital, his division commander promised to get him a Hero of the Soviet Union award.

== Return to the Soviet Union ==
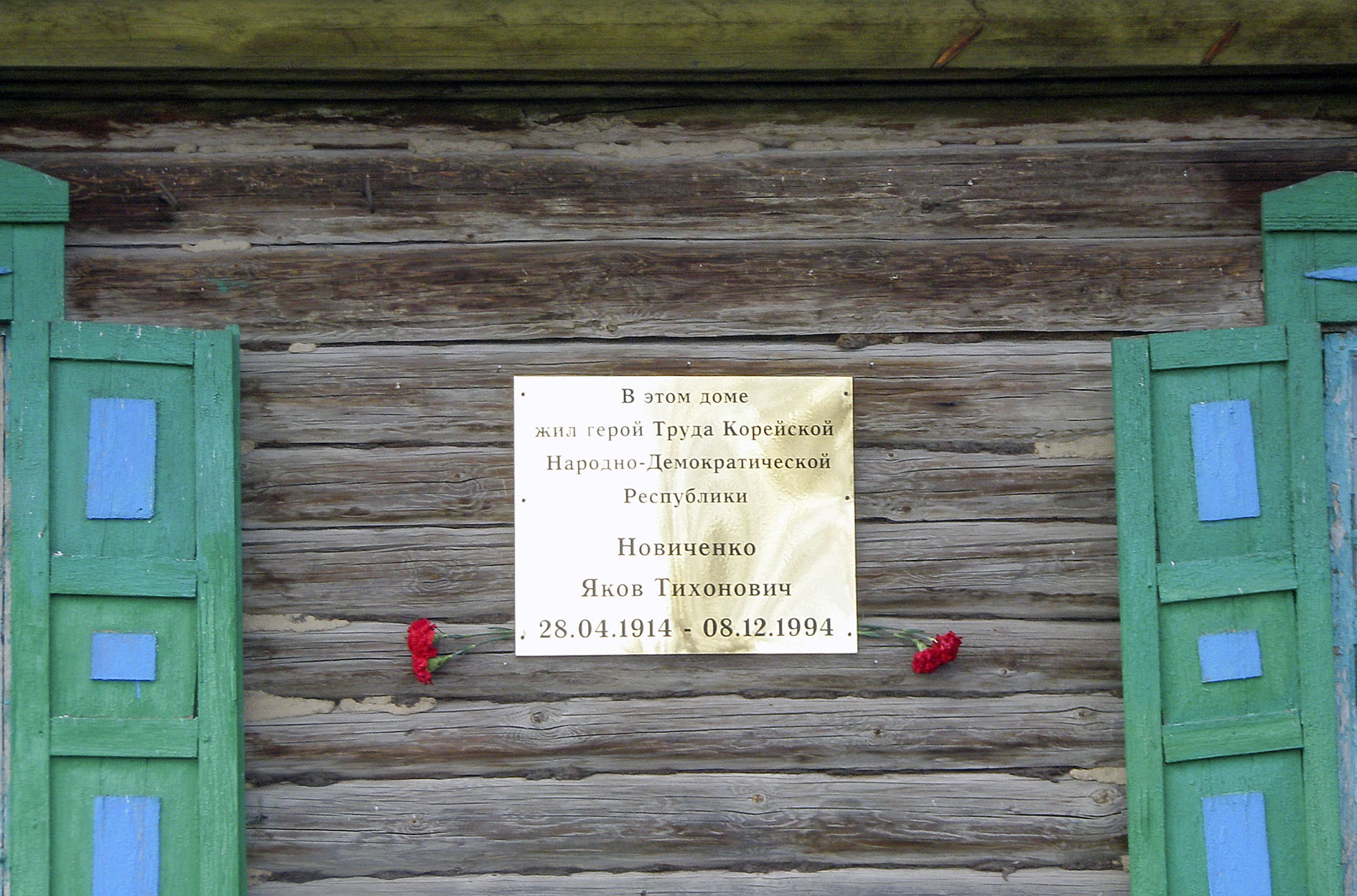
A memorial to Novichenko on his former Travnoye home (2014)

After Novichenko sufficiently recovered, he was discharged in December 1946 and returned home to his family in the village of Travnoye, some 300 km (190 mi) southwest of Novosibirsk.

His fellow villagers were widely skeptical of his story, although they were not surprised to see his injuries due to the recent World War. According to someone who later worked on One Second for a Feat, Novichenko shared the news of his expected Hero of the Soviet Union award, but the award never arrived. He said that his fellow villagers openly mocked him, saying "What are you, a hero without a star?" (Note: «Ты чо, герой, звезду не надел?») When the local collective farm considered candidates for its new chairman, the district secretary reportedly said of Novichenko: "Someone who has lied once cannot be trusted again". (Note: «Человеку, который раз обманул, доверять нельзя»)

Novichenko received little to no special recognition for his feat from his home country for years. In 1949, North Korea awarded him the Order of the National Flag, 3rd Class, but this did not stop the mocking of his neighbors. Outraged, he wrote a letter to the Ministry of Defense in Moscow. After some delay, in fall 1951, he received the lesser Order of the Red Banner award instead of what was originally promised. Tatiana Bogdanova speculated that the request may have gone ignored entirely if not for a meeting between Kim and Stalin around this time. Despite this partial vindication, he was reportedly left embittered by the experience. He avoided discussing his military service; if the word "grenade" was mentioned on the radio or TV, an awkward silence would fall upon the family, and he would walk outside to smoke.

Around this time, he graduated from the Novosibirsk State Agricultural University and worked various jobs afterwards, including farming, manufacturing, and chairing the village council. In the 1960s, Soviet–North Korean relationships soured, but Kim still wrote to Novichenko often, inviting him and his family to visit Pyongyang. Novichenko never replied to these letters.

== Recognition and cult of personality ==
In May 1984, Kim visited the Soviet Union again, after many years of poor Soviet–North Korean relations. According to a 2014 interview given by Alexander Pavlovich Filatov, who was secretary of the Novosibirsk Regional Committee at the time, the Central Committee anticipated that Kim may ask to meet with Novichenko, and they advised Filatov to make preparations. Filatov drove out to Travnoye to tell Novichenko that such a meeting was possible, while also noting that the Central Committee wouldn't themselves broach the idea, and would instead wait for a potential inquiry from Kim.

Kim indeed asked to meet Novichenko, even foregoing a welcoming party he had been invited to, and he asked the KGB for assistance in locating him. In the interim, however, the Central Committee had changed their mind, deciding against the meeting at the last minute. By that point however, Filatov had already invited ten people to rendezvous with Kim, including Novichenko. On 21 May 1984, Novichenko was mowing his lawn when the KGB arrived in a black GAZ Volga, and asked him to quickly clean himself up and prepare for a meeting with Kim. Then, they took him to the Novosibirsk railway station where the reunion was to be held.

When Kim disembarked at the station, he hugged Novichenko. (Note: This event was filmed and photographed.) The two conversed in Russian, of which Kim was an adequate speaker. In reference to how Novichenko's book had saved his life, Kim reportedly said, "I am a communist, I don't believe in a god. But [something miraculous happened]". (Note: «Я хоть и коммунист, в Бога не верю, но там все-таки что-то есть…») Kim reportedly asked Novichenko: "Why haven't you written to me once? I have been busy with the affairs of state but you could have found time to write. Please come to visit me in Pyongyang soon".

=== North Korean Hero of Labor ===
After the meeting, Filatov phoned Moscow and asked if it was still possible to have Novichenko receive the Hero of the Soviet Union award. Their response was that it wouldn't be necessary, as Kim had already notified them that he was going to bestow North Korea's highest title, the Hero of Labor, upon Novichenko. According to an article published by Kim Il Sung University, Kim ordered that Novichenko be given the award after noticing his lesser Order of the Red Banner, deeming it an insufficient honor. On 25 May, North Korean officials filed the requisite paperwork for the award, and it was awarded on 28 July during Novichenko's visit to the country. This made him the first foreign recipient of the award, and the only one as of 2016.

=== Aftermath ===
From that year until his death, Novichenko and three other family members were invited to North Korea on an annual basis. Novichenko and Kim reportedly became close friends, and referred to each other as brothers.

Thus, 38 years after he shielded Kim, Novichenko became famous within North Korea. Some North Korean parents allegedly named their children after him, although doubt has been expressed on the veracity of this claim. The 1985 film One Second for a Feat portrayed Novichenko’s actions at the rally, and starred Andrei Martynov as Novichenko. (Note: According to Bogdanova, while the film was a joint Soviet–North Korean effort, it turned out to be too Korean in character and had little appeal to the Soviets.) In 1987, the sculptor Yi P'yŏn-il produced the statue "Yakov the Internationalist", depicting Novichenko diving for the grenade, his military coat flapping like the wings of an angel, supported by the sheets of a large book. In a 2019 interview with one of Novichenko's daughters, it was revealed that the statue was presently located at the Mansu Hill Grand Monument. Novichenko also received assistance in writing his memoirs, which were ultimately published as Symbol of Friendship. (Note: «Символ дружбы») In addition, the North Korean embassy purchased a Novosibirsk apartment for Novichenko complete with furnishings, including a color television.

However, skepticism among Novichenko's neighbors still lingered somewhat. Rumors emerged that Novichenko had slipped onto the platform without permission to meet Kim. Regardless, Novichenko and the family were relieved to finally be recognized. His granddaughter, Lyudmilla, (Note: Людмила) later said of this experience: (Note: «Но мы очень благодарны корейскому лидеру за то, что он не забыл поступок нашего дедушки. Хорошо, что, пусть и спустя долгих 38 лет, правда раскрылась при жизни деда. Он хотя бы смог доказать, что никого не обманывал. Для него это было очень важно.»)

We are grateful that Kim never forgot our grandfather's deed. Fine, even if it took 38 years, at least the truth came out during our grandfather's lifetime. At last, he could prove he wasn't a liar. That was very important to him.

=== Reason for delayed recognition ===
Historian Andrei Lankov theorized that a long period of poor North Korea–Soviet relations was a significant reason why Novichenko only received the Hero of Labor decades after the fact:

[S]ince around 1983–84, North Korea, increasingly uneasy about China’s drift to market capitalism and Beijing’s de-facto alliance with the U.S., decided to move a bit closer to the USSR, so memories about the Soviet role in the Liberation, hitherto discouraged, were again allowed to resurface. The film about Novichenko was one of the few films made at the time about what in the official parlance was described as ‘the Soviet-Korean friendship'.

== Death and legacy ==
Novichenko died on 8 December 1994 in Travnoye, five months after the death of Kim Il Sung. (Note: Some English-language sources report that he died in 1996, but multiple publications in Russian and the plaques dedicated to Novichenko have the 1994 death date) According to his family, after Kim's death, he had been distraught and lost much of his vigor.

Novichenko is praised in Kim Il Sung's 1992 autobiography, With the Century:

Just as love and science have no national boundaries, revolution knows no boundaries, as proved by the examples of Zhang Wei-hua, Novichenko, Che Guevara, and Norman Bethune. Zhang Wei-hua and Novichenko are worldwide models of internationalists

A number of memorials to Novichenko now exist in his hometown. In 2014, a memorial stele was installed by the North Korean embassy. (Note: Novichenko's original gravestone and home in the village were said to be of modest size, to the surprise of the visiting North Korean officials.) In 2018, a plaque was installed at Novichenko's family home. (Note: Family home at 36 Krasnoyarsk Street (№ 36 на ул. Красноярской).) In Travnoye, a school he helped build is now named after him.

The North Korean embassy has sent a delegation to visit Travnoye every year on 28 April, Novichenko's birthday, and has continued to do so. Many of Novichenko's artifacts, including his silver cigarette case, were donated to a Novosibirsk military museum. Novichenko's family visited North Korea in 2017, and his descendants march with his portrait at the annual Immortal Regiment event on 9 May.

=== Kim Jong Il skips widow visit ===
According to most accounts, including those of Novichenko's family, in July 2001, Kim Jong Il, the son and successor of Kim Il Sung, skipped a scheduled visit to Novosibirsk to meet with Novichenko's 82-year-old widow. The train had even stopped for 20 minutes at the Novosibirsk railway station, where Novichenko's widow was waiting, but Kim Jong Il did not disembark. Instead, Kim sent along a North Korean official with a briefcase of gifts. (Note: Novichenko's family reportedly found the quality of the gifts to be "just ok" («Это нормально»), although they acknowledged the difficult financial situation in North Korea and deeply appreciated the gifts.) She was assured that Kim would meet her on his way back from Moscow, but that meeting never materialized. In 2013, Benjamin R. Young noted that the younger Kim tended to have a more reserved personality than that of his father.

However, an official 2008 biography of Kim Jong Il contradicts this account and claims the meeting happened.

=== Later honors ===
In 2014, on the 100th anniversary of Novichenko's birth, Kim Il Sung's grandson Kim Jong Un sent a delegation that included the North Korean ambassador to Russia Kim Yong-jae to pay respects to Novichenko's grave at Travnoye. They placed monuments to Novichenko, and the ambassador said, "Novichenko is a close friend of the Korean people, and his memory will live on in the hearts of our people forever".

On 26 July 2022, the mayor of Novosibirsk placed flowers on Novichenko's grave to celebrate the 69th anniversary of the alleged North Korean victory in the Korean War. Novichenko's daughter Tatyana was present at the ceremony.

In September 2026, a new road bridge between Russia and North Korea was opened and named in his honor.

=== Family response to North Korea controversies ===
When Novichenko's family is asked about controversies related to North Korea, they consistently reply "Our family stays out of politics". (Note: «Наша семья вне политики») In 2017, Novichenko's granddaughter Lyudmilla said of this: (Note: «Мы простые люди, живущие в глубинке России. И наш дедушка был простым тружеником села. Где он и где Ким Ир Сен?»)

We are ordinary people living in the outback of Russia. And our grandfather was a simple village laborer. Where was he, and where was Kim Il Sung?

== Personal life ==
In 1932, Novichenko married a woman named Maria, a milkmaid he had met while working on a kolkhoz. She died in March 2013, at age 93. They had six children together. He learned that his first daughter was born while he was serving in East Asia.

Novichenko had a prosthesis after the incident, but he did not always wear it. Despite his past injuries, he remained physically active and rarely got sick. He performed manual labor with only his left hand, and asked for assistance from his children if he needed help. He built most of the family home.

According to the official website of the city of Novosibirsk, Soviet officials gave Novichenko an apartment in Novosibirsk after Kim Il Sung's visit in 1984. The family mostly moved there, but they would spend the summer in Travnoye.

He was a smoker.

=== Personality ===
Novichenko was fond of raising horses and an active reader of both fiction and current events. According to Novichenko's youngest daughter Tatiana Yakovlevna, (Note: Татьяна Яковлевна) Novichenko was a modest, patient, and private person, and rarely discussed his feats. She only learned that her father had saved Kim Il Sung when she was around the fifth or sixth grade.

He reportedly did not look the part of a muscular hero, but was tenacious, and had the nickname "flint man". (Note: человек-кремень) Boris Krishtul, production manager of One Second for a Feat, said of Novichenko: (Note: «Раньше мне казалось, что герой должен и выглядеть как герой - статным, стремительным, боевым. Но Яков Новиченко не был похож на мой придуманный образ. Он оказался скромным, мягким человеком»)

Before, I thought that heroes looked like heroes—stately, impetuous, militant. But Yakov Novichenko didn't resemble the image in my head. He turned out to be a humble, gentle man.

== Awards ==
| Date | Award | Country | Ref(s) |
|---|---|---|---|
| 30 September 1945 | Medal "For the Victory over Japan" | Soviet Union | |
| 1946 | Order of the Patriotic War | Soviet Union | |
| 1946 | Medal "For Battle Merit" | Soviet Union | |
| 22 February 1949 | Order of the National Flag, 3rd Class | North Korea | |
| Fall 1951 | Order of the Red Banner | Soviet Union | |
| 20 October 1956 | Medal "For the Development of Virgin Lands" | Soviet Union | |
| 22 February 1966 | Jubilee Medal "Twenty Years of Victory in the Great Patriotic War 1941–1945" | Soviet Union | |
| 25 May 1984 (Note: The certificate accompanying the award lists this date, but Russian articles claim the award was presented to Novichenko in July) | Hero of Labor | North Korea | |
| 25 May 1984 | Order of the National Flag, 1st Class | North Korea | |
| 11 March 1985 | Jubilee Medal "Forty Years of Victory in the Great Patriotic War 1941–1945" | Soviet Union | |

== Notes and references ==
=== Sources ===
==== In English ====
- Gabroussenko, Tatiana (1 January 2012), "The North Korean Philosophy of Foreigners", Korea 2012, vol. 6, Brill Publishers, pp. 261–262, ISBN 9789004243019
- Kim Jong Il Biography 3 (PDF), Pyongyang, Korea: Foreign Languages Publishing House, 2008
- "Kim meets Putin envoy in Omsk", The Irish Times, 1 August 2001
- "North Korean leader Kim Jong-un orders delegation to Siberia to commemorate their 'national hero'", The Siberian Times, 5 May 2014, archived from the original on 8 May 2023
- Kim, Il Sung (1993). Resminiscences: With the Century 4. Pyongyang: Foreign Languages Publishing House. pp. 1–477. OCLC 28377167.
- Schönherr, Johannes (13 June 2018), "North Korea's International Movie Co-Productions, 1985-2012", Film International
- North Korea's Kim makes stop in Siberia, United Press International, 31 July 2001
- Rawnsley, Adam (6 July 2017), "How (Not) to Kill Kim Jong Un", Foreign Policy
- Young, Benjamin R. (12 December 2013), "Meet the man who saved Kim Il Sung's life", NK News

==== In Korean ====
- Hwang, Seong-jun (1 August 2001), "[특파원 메모] '김일성 은인' 노비첸코와 김정일" [[Correspondent's Memo] 'Kim Il Sung's Savior' Novichenko and Kim Jong Il], The Chosun Ilbo (in Korean)
- Kim, Guk-hu; Ahn, Hui-chang; Yoo, Yeong-gu; Ahn, Seong-gyu (1 March 1992), "김일성 암살 미수사건" [The attempted assassination of Kim Il Sung], JoongAng Ilbo (in Korean)
- Kim, Kwang-in (28 February 2001), "광복후 첫 3·1절 행사서 테러 사고" [The First March 1st Movement Anniversary Terrorist Incident], NK Chosun (in Korean)
- Kim, Joo-won (2 September 2020), "3.1절 김일성 암살사건" [The March 1st anniversary Kim Il Sung assassination incident], Radio Free Asia (in Korean)
- Pak, Hyong-nam (15 June 2019), 생명의 은인으로 불러주시며 [Call Me the Savior of Life] (in Korean), Kim Il Sung University
- Son, Sae-il (June 2011), 孫世一의 비교 評傳 (86) [Son Sae-il's Comparative Biography No. 86] (in Korean)

==== In Russian ====
- Bogdanova, Tatiana (30 October 2017), "Русский герой КНДР. Сибиряк спас Ким Ир Сена, закрыв собой гранату" [The Russian Hero of the DPRK. A Siberian saved Kim Il Sung from a grenade], Argumenty i Fakty (in Russian)
- "Брусиловский прорыв", FantLab
- "Новиченко Яков Тихонович" [Novichenko, Yakov Tikhonovich], Immortal Regiment (in Russian), 25 April 2015
- Kara, Jan (19 April 2023), "Ким Ир Сен — товарищ великий вождь: жизнь и деяния основателя Северной Кореи" [Kim Il Sung — Comrade and great leader: life and acts of the founder of North Korea], 24СМИ (in Russian)
- "АНОНС: В Новосибирске почтут память Якова Новиченко, спасшего Ким Ир Сена от взрыва гранаты" [ANNOUNCEMENT: A memorial will be held to Yakov Novichenko, who saved Kim Il Sung from a grenade], официальный сайт города новосибирска [Official website of the city of Novosibirsk] (in Russian), 22 July 2022
- Plotnikov, Yuri (8 May 2014), "Человек, который спас вождя" [The Man Who Saved the Leader] (PDF), Наука в Сибири [Science in Siberia] (in Russian)
- Polevoy, Nikolai (27 February 2023), ""Секунда на подвиг" Как советский офицер спас Ким Ир Сена от покушения" ["One Second for a Feat" How a Soviet officer saved Kim Il Sung from an assassination attempt], Политика сегодня [Politics Today] (in Russian), archived from the original on 3 June 2023
- Samodelova, Svetlana (22 December 2019), "Как советский офицер стал национальным героем Северной Кореи" [How a Soviet Officer Became a National Hero of North Korea], Moskovskij Komsomolets (in Russian)
- Sergeyev-Tsensky, Sergei (1944), Брусиловский прорыв: исторический роман (in Russian), Гос. изд-во худож. лит-ры
- "Путешествие Дорогого товарища Ким Чен Ира из Пхеньяна в Москву" [The Journey of Dear Comrade Kim Jong Il From Pyongyang to Moscow], Komsomolskaya Pravda (in Russian), 30 July 2001
- Travina, Margarita (15 April 2016), "70 ЛЕТ НАЗАД НОВОСИБИРЕЦ СПАС РУКОВОДИТЕЛЯ КНДР КИМ ИР СЕНА" [70 YEARS AGO A NOVOSIBERIAN SAVED DPRK LEADER KIM IL SUNG], Sovetskaya Sibir (in Russian)
