= Escape (2005 film) =

- Russian: Побег
- Directed by: Egor Konchalovsky
- Written by: Sergey Astakhov; Dmitri Kotov; Oleg Pogodin
- Produced by: Sergey Danielyanproducer; Ruben Dishdishyan
- Starring: Yevgeny Mironov; Aleksey Serebryakov; Andrey Smolyakov; Sergey Astakhov; Viktoriya Tolstoganova
- Cinematography: Anton Antonov
- Edited by: Aleksandr Chupakov
- Music by: Viktor Sologub
- Release date: 2005
- Country: Russia
- Language: Russian

Escape (Russian: Побег, romanized: Pobeg) is a 2005 Russian crime thriller film directed by Egor Konchalovsky. The film tells about the successful man Yevgeny Vetrov, whose wife suddenly died. All the evidence was against Vetrov. He was convicted and he decides to escape.

== Plot ==
Successful neurosurgeon Yevgeny Vetrov enjoys a fulfilling life with the respect of colleagues and love of his wife, Irina. Although their inability to have children saddens Irina, they consider adopting a boy from an orphanage, but Yevgeny hesitates at the last moment. During a significant contract signing, someone poisons Irina’s champagne, and she rushes home feeling ill, only to be attacked by an intruder. Yevgeny returns to find her severely injured, but she dies in his arms. A neighbor overhears Yevgeny’s anguished, self-blaming words, which leads to him being wrongfully accused of her murder and swiftly convicted due to circumstantial evidence.

En route to prison, a daring escape attempt leads to chaos, allowing Yevgeny to flee. Determined to prove his innocence and find the true killer, he returns to Moscow, pursued by special forces under Colonel Pakhomov, who harbors doubts about Yevgeny’s guilt. With help from a colleague, Svetlana, Yevgeny finds a critical clue—a rare contact lens left by the murderer. Pakhomov eventually discovers that the real killer is a fellow officer, Topilin, who acted out of revenge due to Yevgeny's colleague Sobolev’s botched surgery on Topilin's wife. In a final confrontation, Topilin kills Sobolev and then himself, exonerating Yevgeny. With his name cleared, Yevgeny saves Pakhomov's paralyzed daughter with surgery and, honoring Irina’s wish, adopts the boy from the orphanage, watched over by her spirit with a serene smile.

== Cast ==
- Yevgeny Mironov as Yevgeny Vetrov
- Aleksey Serebryakov as Pakhomov
- Andrey Smolyakov as Topilin
- Sergey Astakhov as Sobolev
- Viktoriya Tolstoganova as Irina
- Lyubov Tolkalina as Tatyana
- Natalya Arinbasarova as Orphanage Director (as N. Arinbasarova)
- Yury Belyayev
- Sergey Gabrielyan
- Kseniya Lavrova-Glinka
- Yevgeny Knyazev
