= Urazbaev =

Urazbaev, Urazbayev, or Urozboev is a Turkic surname with Slavic suffix "-ev" from the given name Urazbay, Uzbek: O'razboy. Uzbek-language versions include Oʻrazboyev and Oʻrazbayev. Notable people with the surname include:

- Eldor Urazbayev
- Kairat Urazbayev (born 1963), Kazakh politician and oil industry manager
- Diyorbek Urozboev
- Magomet Urazbayev (1906–1971), Soviet Uzbek mechanics scientist
