= The Magical Portrait =

- Russian: Волшебный портрет
- Directed by: Gennady Vasilyev
- Written by: Sergei Kozlov; Gennady Vasilyev; Shi U. Zhang
- Produced by: Tzjuangchan Jen; Vitaliy Sidorenko
- Starring: Sergey Shnyryov; Li Gao; Valentina Telichkina; Andrey Martynov; Vladimir Antonik
- Cinematography: Boris Bondarenko
- Music by: Dmitriy Rybnikov
- Release date: 1997
- Countries: Russia; China
- Language: Russian

The Magical Portrait (Russian: Волшебный портрет) is a 1997 Russian-Chinese fantasy film directed by Gennady Vasilyev in his last film before his death.

== Plot ==
Ivan lives in a village where he finds a portrait of the beautiful Chinese woman Xiao Qin, the portrait comes to life later and both fall in love with each other. And suddenly an evil sorcerer, just as enchanted by Xiao Qin, comes to the village.

== Cast ==
- Sergey Shnyryov as Ivan
- Li Gao (Гао Ли) as Xiao Qin
- Valentina Telichkina
- Andrey Martynov
- Vladimir Antonik as The Duke
- Irina Bezrukova
- Natalya Goncharova
- Tszjangjuang Chang
- Vladimir Episkoposyan
- Sergey Galkin
