= Pavel Yakubovsky =

Russian and Soviet artist

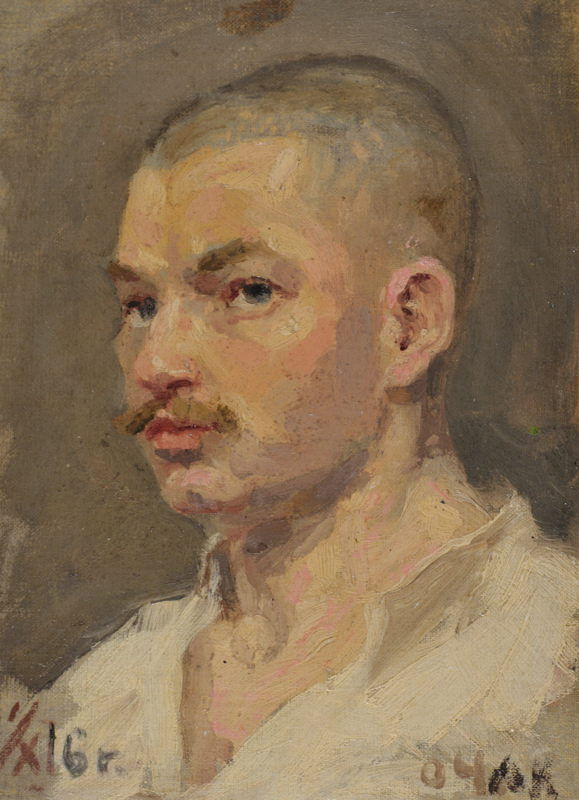
- Self-portrait, 1916
- Born: 1891; Kursk Governorate, Russian Empire
- Died: 1945 (aged 53–54); Novosibirsk, RSFSR, Soviet Union

Pavel Gerontievich Yakubovsky (Russian: Павел Геронтьевич Якубовский; 1891–1945) was a Russian and Soviet artist, a member of the Union of Artists of the USSR (1937), one of the first painters of Novosibirsk.

== Biography ==
Pavel Yakubovsky was born on July 12, 1891, in Kursk Governorate. In 1900, the future artist moved to Novonikolayevsk (modern Novosibirsk).

Yakubovsky graduated from a parochial school, after which, since 1903, he worked as a hammerer for three years.

From 1907 to 1909, he studied at the Ignatiev Painting Workshop in Novonikolayevsk. He worked as a decorator in a railway club and painted private houses in the city.

Since 1912, the artist began to participate in art exhibitions. In 1914, he took part in an exhibition in Novonikolayevsk organized on the initiative of the Tomsk artist and pedagogue F. I. Gavelka.

In 1914, Yakubovsky was mobilized into the Russian Army and participated in the First World War. During the revolution of 1917 the artist was in Odessa, where he was elected city deputy from the soldiers. Until 1923, he served in the Red Army, but resigned for health reasons and returned to Novonikolayevsk.

Since 1923, he worked as an artist in the Za Sotsialisticheskoye Zemledelie and the Vestnik Selkhozkooperatsii magazines as well as in the Sovetskaya Sibir newspaper.

He was a member of the Novosibirsk branch of the AKhRR (1926).

In 1927, Yakubovsky worked as a draftsman and designer in Novosibirsk State Construction Office (Novosibirskaya Gosstroikontora). In 1928–1934, he worked as an architect in design organizations.

Since 1935, he was a member of the Khudozhnik Novosibirsk Association.

Pavel Yakubovsky worked in an organization that carried out monumental and decorative work during the construction of the future Novosibirsk Opera and Ballet Theatre (1938).

He died on June 22, 1945, in Novosibirsk.

== Exhibitions ==
- Exhibition of works by Tomsk and Novonikolayevsk artists (Novonikolayevsk, 1914)
- Third West Siberian Regional Art Exhibition (Novosibirsk, 1936)
- Oblast Art Exhibition (Novosibirsk, 1940)
- Artists of Siberia in the Days of the Great Patriotic War and The Heroic Past of the Russian Army (Novosibirsk, 1942, 1943)

=== Posthumous solo exhibitions ===
- Solo exhibition (Novosibirsk, 1948)
- Exhibition of Pavel Yakubovsky at the Novosibirsk State Art Museum (2002)

== Gallery ==
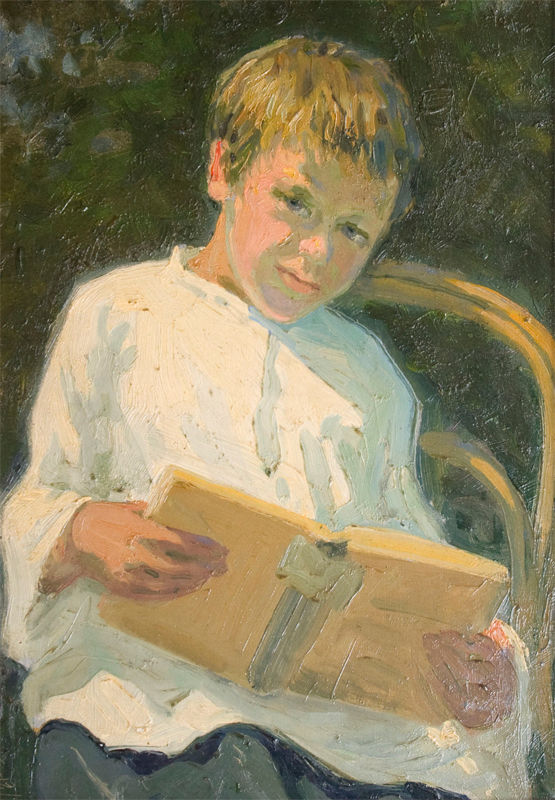
Boy with a book

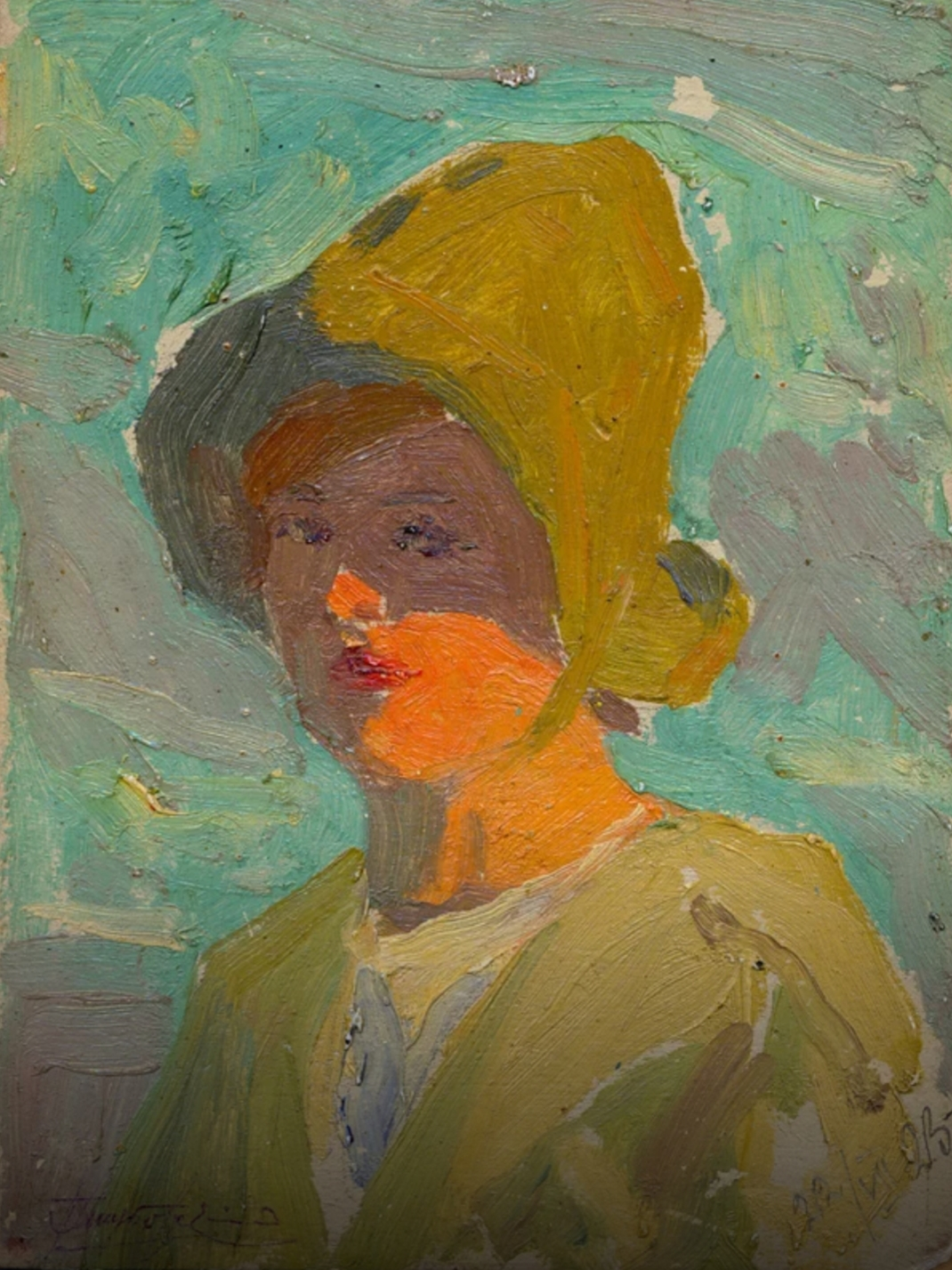
Artist's wife V. I. Yakubovskaya

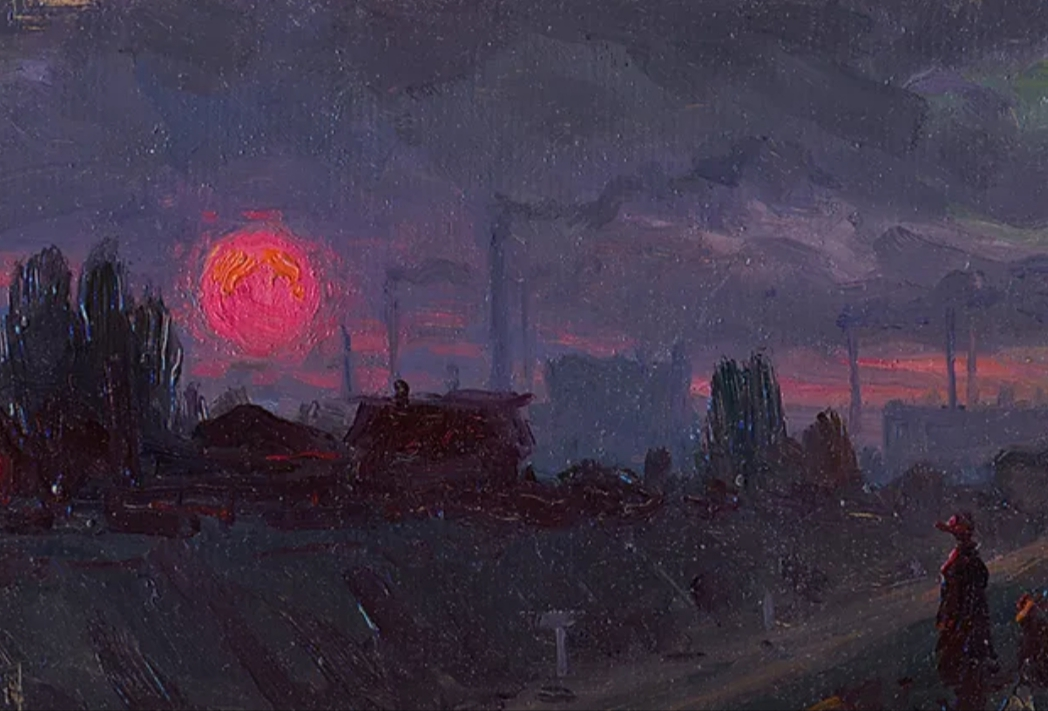
Sunset during a thunderstorm. Novosibirsk

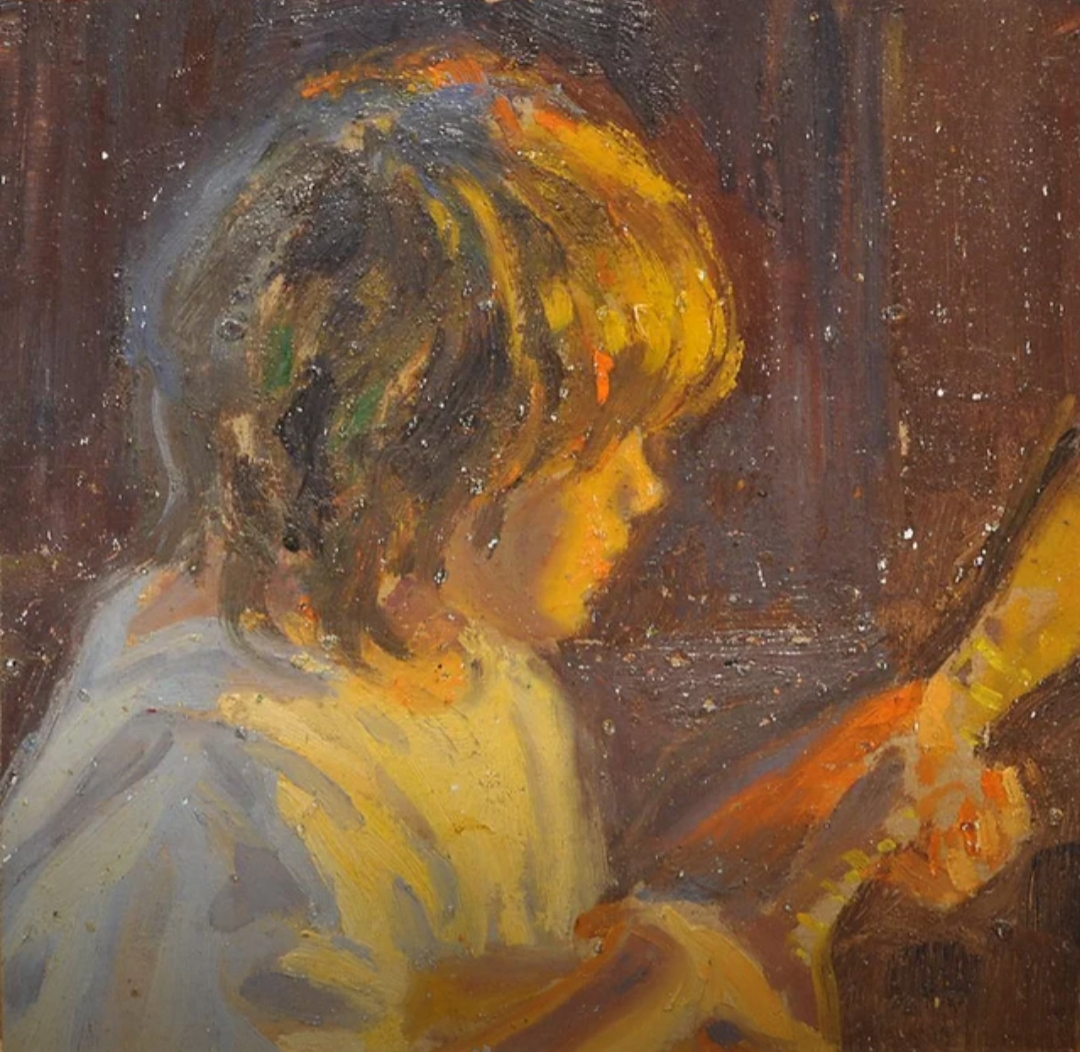
Girl with a balalaika

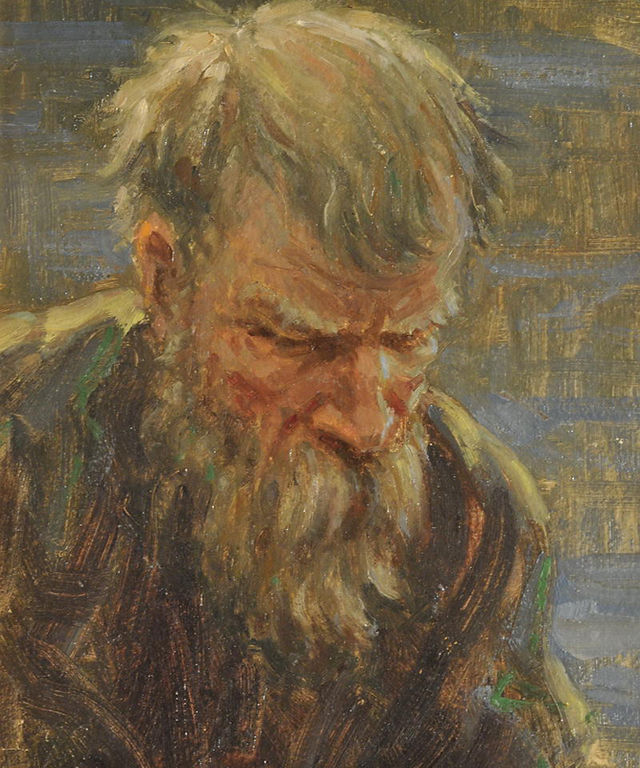

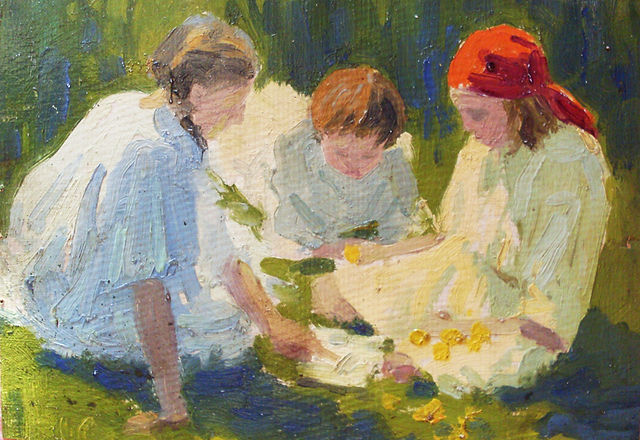
