= Veniamin Romov =

Russian and Soviet cartoonist

Veniamin Romov (1881–1929) was a Russian and Soviet cartoonist.

== Biography ==
Veniamin Romov was born in 1881 in the village of Malaya Sila, Perm Governorate. His father was a priest.

In 1906, he entered the Medical Faculty of the Tomsk University. During this period he studied painting with Mikhail Shcheglov.

In December 1909, the artist became editor of the satirical magazine Silhouettes of Hometown Life.

In 1920, the artist was invited to the Sibgosteater in Novonikolayevsk (modern. Novosibirsk), and a year later he went to work with M. M. Basov in the regional publishing house. It was at that time that his cartoons under the pseudonym "Romov" began to appear in local newspapers. Romov's drawings, with witty captions, appeared in the newspaper Sovetskaya Sibir, and the magazines "Comrade" and "Siberia". The artist illustrated the magazine "Hunter and Fool of Siberia", according to contemporaries, increasing the circulation of this publication.

In 1922, the newspaper's employees came up with the idea of creating a satirical magazine Skorpion, which would criticize such phenomena as petty bourgeoisie, philistinism, formalism, and bureaucracy. The artists of Skorpion were A. Ivanov and V. Romov. Romov's cartoons, published in the headings "Nep Grimaces" and "Grimaces of life", reflected the characteristic types of that era: a smug Nepman and combine dealers who used "air" and "smoke" as profit.

The artist died in January 1929.

== Gallery ==
=== Grimaces of NEP ===
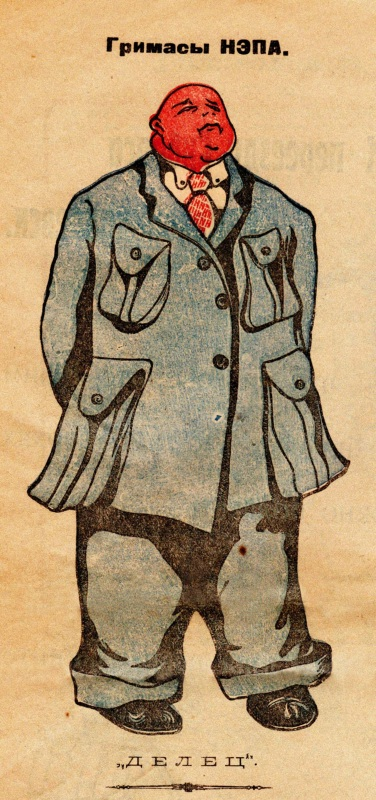

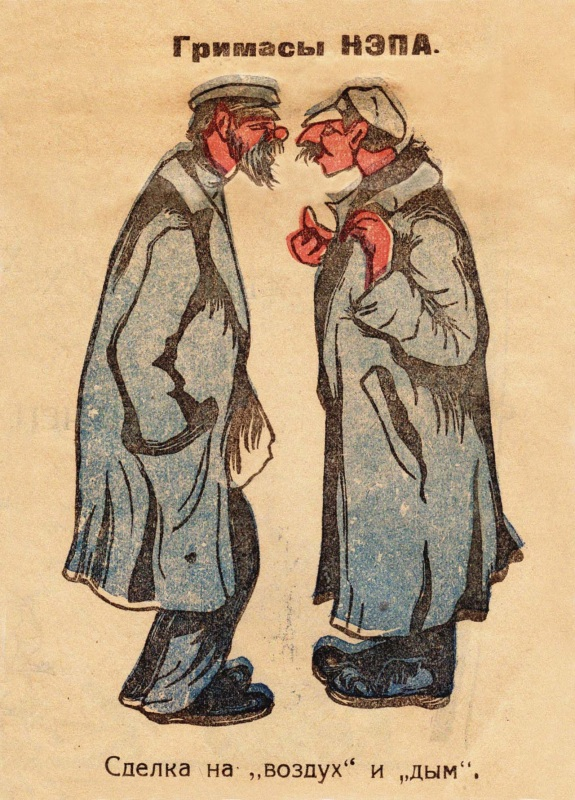

=== Novonikolayevsk Types ===
In 1922, the artist created a series of drawings Novonikolaevsk Types, which were published by Sibkrayizdat as postcards.

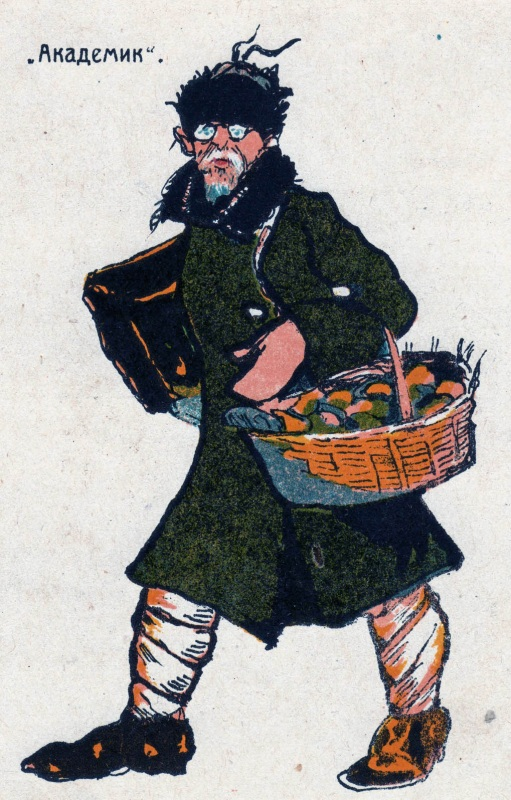

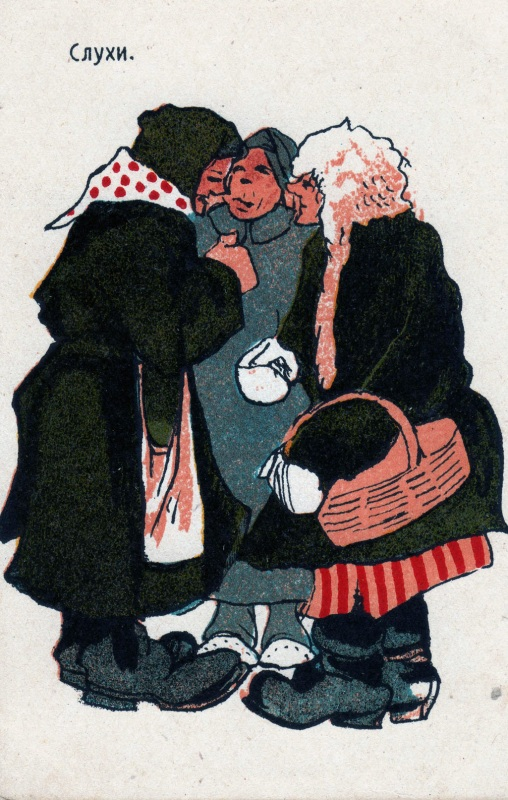

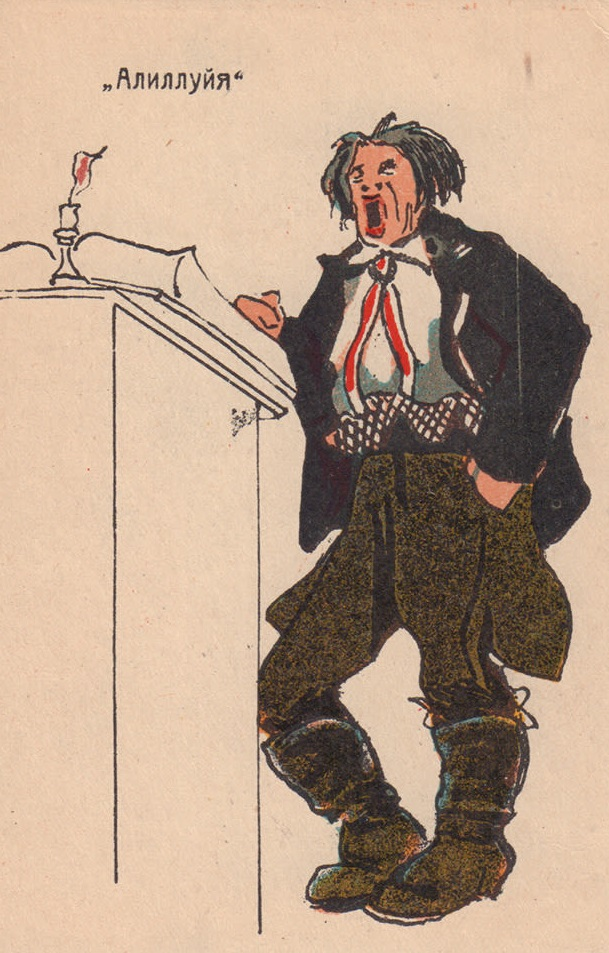

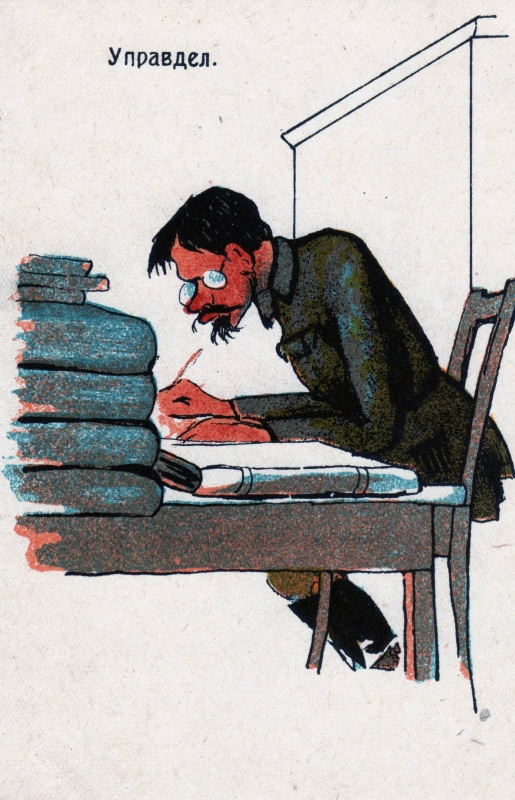

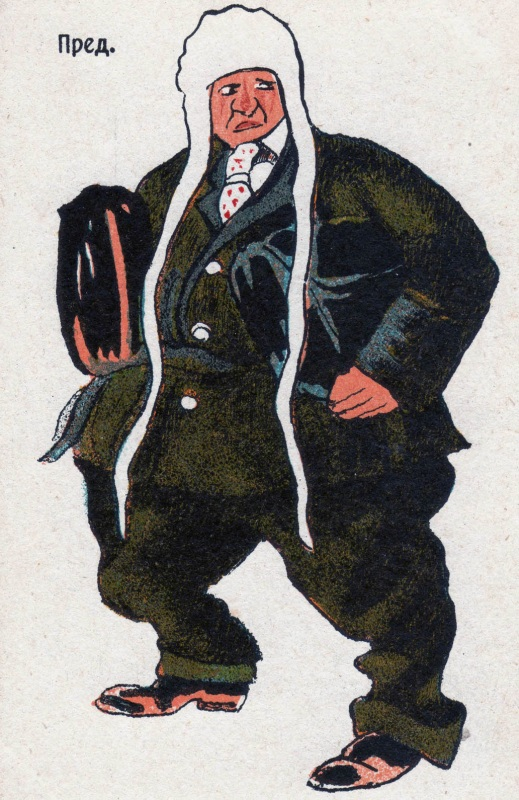

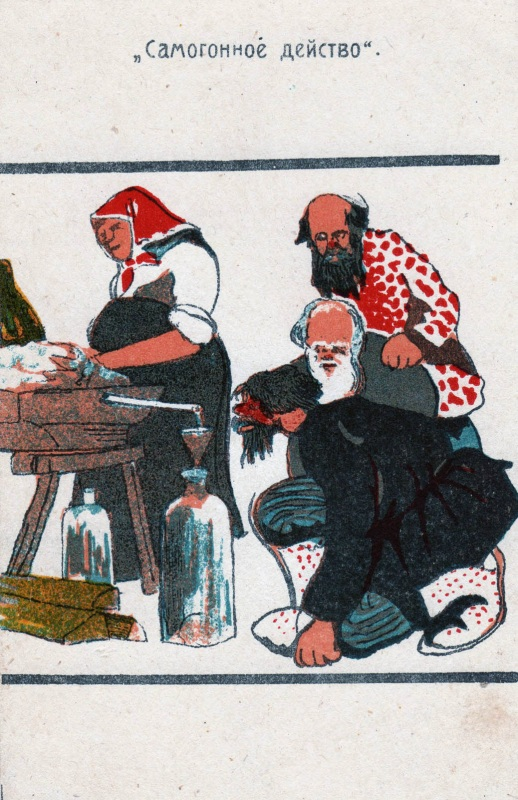

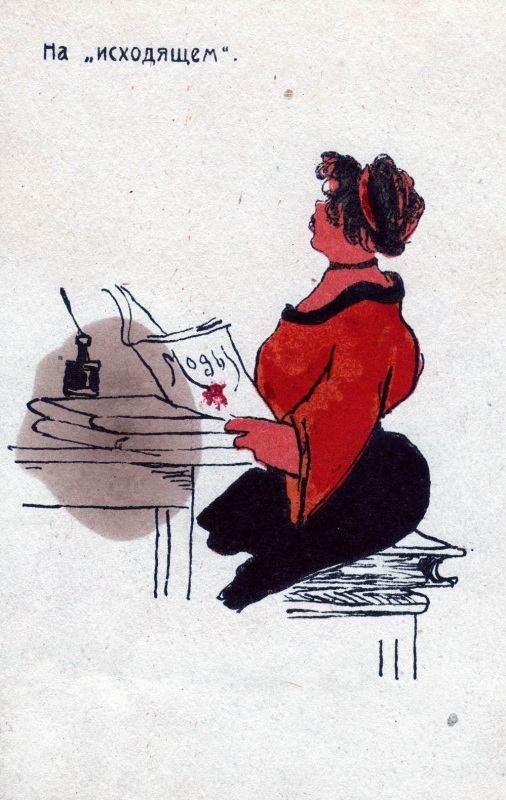
