= My Father Is a Chieftain =

- Directed by: Egor Konchalovsky
- Written by: Ivan Novikov; Kirill Pletnyov
- Produced by: Olga Akatieva; Anastasiya Akopyan; Lika Blank
- Starring: Dmitry Nagiyev; Maria Mironova; Evgeniy Romantsov; Fyodor Dobronravov; Roman Madyanov; Natalya Arinbasarova; Maksim Lagashkin; Olga Khokhlova
- Cinematography: Anton Antonov
- Music by: Sergey Luran
- Release date: May 26, 2022
- Country: Russia
- Language: Russian

My Father Is a Chieftain (Russian: Мой папа — вождь, romanized: Moy papa - vozhd) is a 2022 Russian children's comedy film directed by Egor Konchalovsky. It stars Dmitry Nagiyev. It was theatrically released on May 26, 2022.

== Plot ==
The film tells about a sea captain who, ten years after his disappearance, returned home in the form of an African leader and now he walks around the city with a spear, not recognizing the rules of modern society.

== Cast ==
- Dmitry Nagiyev
- Maria Mironova
- Evgeniy Romantsov
- Fyodor Dobronravov
- Roman Madyanov
- Natalya Arinbasarova
- Maksim Lagashkin
- Olga Khokhlova
