= Classic (1998 film) =

- Russian: Классик
- Directed by: Georgy Shengeliya
- Written by: Pavel Chukhray; Elena Karavaeshnikova; Georgiy Shengeliya
- Produced by: Vladimir Dostal; Viktor Glukhov
- Starring: Sergey Nikonenko; Juozas Budraitis; Aleksei Guskov; Valentina Telichkina; Lidiya Velezheva
- Cinematography: Ilya Dyomin
- Edited by: Tatyana Egorycheva
- Music by: Andrey Baturin
- Production companies: Kinomost; Mosfilm
- Release date: 1998
- Running time: 101 min.
- Country: Russia
- Language: Russian

Classic (Russian: Классик, romanized: Klassik) is a 1998 Russian action film directed by Georgy Shengeliya.

== Plot ==
In 1990s Russia, the billiard masters club raises funds to build a luxury retirement home for their teachers: the previous generation of billiard players, now elderly. A crime lord named Savitsky is among those asked for the $20,000 share (in 1998, a very serious sum, unobtainable for most people), which he begrudgingly grants, but then sends his goons after the couriers and steals the entire sum for himself. The surviving courier proposes to take the money back by force to his Moscow superiors, but those decide to outwit Savitsky instead.

Soon, Savitsky's home city receives word from the capital that they are about to be visited by a master player known only as "the Classic," who will challenge Savitsky to a duel with an $150,000 bet. Savitsky decides to play along but cheat in order to win at any cost. To obtain the money, he contacts his old business partner, signing up for a loan that, if not paid back, will force him to give up his entire criminal network.

Indeed, an elderly player named Gorsky arrives soon with his bodyguard Yuri, claiming to be a famous writer who can afford such a bet. Witnessing his skills with the cue, as well as his characteristic knowledge of the classic literature (thus the codename), Savitsky concludes that Gorsky must be the Classic, and accepts the challenge. As special precautions, they agree on the rules: refusal to play counts as a loss, and the arbiter of the duel shall be a known crime lord known as Monarch.

A day before the duel, Savitsky sends hitmen to break Gorsky's right arm, staging an assault on his fiancée. They succeed, and Savitsky then sends his spy Lily to seduce Yuri and find out of the duo's further plans. Crippled, Gorsky says that now Yuri will have to play in his stead, using special magnetic balls that can be directed using a remote control. Learning of this, Savitsky disarms the system, seemingly assuring his victory.

In the morning, Gorsky requests that Yuri play in his place, which Monarch allows. To everyone's surprise, Yuri wins the match flawlessly, without even granting his opponent a turn, and reveals that he is the true Classic, having hidden his identity due to Savitsky's likely cheating. Impressed, Monarch gives him the prize and leaves. When the shootout is about to begin, Gorsky reveals a hidden revolver and disarms his opponents, also revealing that he is ambidextrous and unrivaled with a gun. The two escape to Moscow, leaving Savitsky to pay back his debts with his entire fortune.

In Moscow, the retirement home is opened soon. The film concludes with the club's eldest and most respected player, Vasiliy, being given an honor of the first party, which he begins with a perfect move despite his shaking hands.

== Cast ==
- Sergey Nikonenko as Gorsky
- Juozas Budraitis as Savitsky
- Aleksei Guskov as Yura
- Valentina Telichkina as Irina
- Lidiya Velezheva as Lilya
- Aleksandr Pankratov-Chyorny as Vitya
- Vladimir Etush as Monarch
- Vladimir Zeldin as Vasiliy
- Yevgeni Serov as Finish
- Valery Barinov as mansion owner

== Accolades ==
Award	Date of ceremony	Category	Recipient(s)	Result	Ref.
Nika Awards	April 30, 1999	Best Actor	Sergey Nikonenko	Nominated	
Kinotavr	June 14, 1999	Grand Prize	Classic	Nominated	
Constellation International Film Festival	December 18, 1999	Best Actor	Sergey Nikonenko	Won	
Constellation International Film Festival	December 18, 1999	Best Supporting Actor	Aleksei Guskov	Won	
