= Vladimir Antonik =

Russian actor

Vladimir Vladimirovich Antonik
- Born: 13 February 1953 (age 73); Slonim, BSSR, USSR
- Occupation: Actor
- Years active: 1972-present

Vladimir Vladimirovich Antonik (Belarusian: Уладзімір Уладзіміравіч Антонік; born 13 February 1953) is a Russian actor and voice actor. He is best known for his performance as Trofimov in Lenin in Paris.

== Children ==
Anna Antonik and Yevgeniy Antonik

== Selected filmography ==
=== Film ===
Year	Title	Role	Notes
1981	Lenin in Paris	Trofimov	
1982	I Cannot Say "Farewell"	Kostya	
1985	Primary Russia	Ratibor	
1991	Tsar Ivan the Terrible	Persten	
1997	The Magical Portrait	The Duke	
