= One Second for a Feat =

1985 Soviet–North Korean historical film

- Секунда на подвиг
- Hangul: 영원한 전우
- RR: Yeongwonhan jeonu
- MR: Yŏngwŏnhan chŏnu
- Directed by: Eldor Urazbayev; Gil-sen Om
- Written by: Alexander Borodyansky; Paek In-jun
- Starring: Andrey Martynov; Chang su Choi; Oleg Anofriyev
- Cinematography: Elizbar Karavayev; Ik Han Chong
- Music by: Eduard Artemyev
- Production companies: Mosfilm; Korean Film Studio
- Release date: 1985
- Running time: 127 minutes
- Countries: Soviet Union; North Korea
- Languages: Korean; Russian

One Second for a Feat (Russian: Секунда на подвиг; Korean: 영원한 전우; lit. 'The Eternal Comrade') is a 1985 Soviet–North-Korean two-part military historical film directed by Eldor Urazbayev. The film is also known by a translation of its Korean name: Unforgettable Companion. The film is about the exploits of the Soviet Army Lieutenant Yakov Novichenko who rescued Kim Il Sung from a grenade thrown at the Pyongyang rally on 1 March 1946.

== Plot ==
After the liberation of the North Korean Red Army from Japanese rule in August 1945, junior lieutenant Yakov Novichenko remains with the Koreans to help them rebuild the ruined country. But the country is still uneasy: the bourgeois Koreans, who lost power and property, together with the US military advisers, are preparing a plot to overthrow Kim Il Sung.

On 1 March 1946, a rally is opened in Pyongyang, dedicated to the 27th anniversary of the March First Movement against Japanese colonial rule in Korea. At the rally the Chairman of the Provisional People's Committee of North Korea Kim Il Sung begins to speak. Suddenly, one of the conspirators throws a grenade in his direction. Junior Lieutenant Novichenko quickly runs up to him, takes it in his hand and, not knowing where to throw it, lies down on it with his body. The grenade explodes, but the book that the Soviet officer accidentally placed under the greatcoat saves his life. Severely wounded Novichenko is being carried off by his comrades, and Kim Il Sung continues his speech. The rally continues and the conspiracy fails.

Doctors save the life of Yakov Novichenko, but he loses his right hand. The film ends with his visit to North Korea in 1984.

== Release ==
The film was shown to prominent North Koreans at a special screening on 11 August 1985. The Minister of Defence O Jin-u was present at the screening.

== Cast ==
- Andrey Martynov – Yakov Novichenko
- Chang su Choi – Ri Chang Hyok
- Oleg Anofriyev – Gurenko
- Yong-hi Chong – Cho Sun Yong
- Song-gwang Li – Cho Gwang se
- Ri Yong Il (리영일) – Kim Il Sung (Uncredited)
- Natalya Arinbasarova – Nurse
- Irina Shevchuk – Maria Novichenko
- Marina Leutova – Raisa Novichenko
- Lim Mi Yong – Cho Sun Ae
- Pak Chang Yoon – Kwon Dok Sul
- Ri Kun wu – Kim Chaek
- Vladimir Antonik – Ivan Novichenko
- Vyacheslav Baranov – Pechkin
- Kang Won Suk (강원숙) – Kwon Hyun Thek (uncredited)
- Lim In Gon – Koh Dal min
- Victor Filippov – Bobyr
- Vladimir Ferapontov – Samokhin
- Aleksandr Belyavsky – Chistyakov
- Yuri Sarantsev – Romanenko
- Vadim Zakharchenko – Chief Physician
- Vadim Grachyov – Marshal Meretskov
- Han chin sop – O Song Chil
