= Vecherniy Novosibirsk =

Newspaper in Novosibirsk, Russia

Vecherniy Novosibirsk (Russian: "Вечерний Новосибирск" ~ The Evening Novosibirsk) is a newspaper published in Novosibirsk, Russia. It comes out five times a week, 250 times a year.

As of 2007, the editor-in-chief is Vladimir Ivanovich Kuzmenkin.

== See also ==
- Sovetskaya Sibir
