= You I Love =

2004 film by Dmitry Troitsky

- Film poster
- Directed by: Olga Stolpovskaja; Dmitry Troitsky
- Written by: Olga Stolpovskaja; Alisa Tanskaya; Dmitry Troitsky
- Produced by: Olga Stolpovskaja; Dmitry Troitsky
- Starring: Damir Badmaev; Lyubov Tolkalina; Yevgeny Koryakovsky
- Cinematography: Aleksandr Simonov
- Edited by: Sergei Plyushchenko; Oleg Rayevsky
- Distributed by: Picture This! Entertainment (USA)
- Release date: 20 April 2004
- Running time: 86 minutes
- Country: Russia
- Language: Russian

You I Love (Russian: Я люблю тебя, romanized: Ya lyublyu tebya) is a 2004 Russian comedy melodrama directed by Olga Stolpovskaja and Dmitry Troitsky. It was the first ever film to come from Russia on the subject of homosexuality or bisexuality.

== Cast ==
- Damir Badmaev as Ulyumdzhi
- Lyubov Tolkalina as Vera Kirillova
- Yevgeny Koryakovsky as Timofey
- Nina Agapova as Timofey's neighbor
- Emanuel Michael Waganda as John

== Reception ==
On Rotten Tomatoes, the film has an aggregated score of 38% based on 12 positive and 20 negative critic reviews. The website’s consensus reads: "A clumsy, overly stylized would-be satire."
