= A Painter's Wife Portrait =

- Russian: Портрет жены художника
- Directed by: Aleksandr Pankratov
- Written by: Yuri Nagibin; Natalya Ryazantseva
- Starring: Valentina Telichkina; Sergey Shakurov; Nikita Mikhalkov; Mikhail Semakov; Vsevolod Shilovsky
- Cinematography: Oleg Martynov
- Edited by: M. Yelyan
- Music by: Eugen Doga
- Production company: Mosfilm
- Release date: 1981
- Running time: 88 min.
- Country: Soviet Union
- Language: Russian

A Painter's Wife Portrait (Russian: Портрет жены художника, romanized: Portret zheny khudozhnika) is a 1981 Soviet romance film directed by Aleksandr Pankratov based on the 1977 story "Берендеев лес" (Berendeyev Forest) by Yuri Nagibin.

== Plot ==
The film focuses on a family that goes for vacation in a small country boarding house. The wife thinks that she is stopping her husband from doing creativity, and she begins to flirt with another man. Meeting this man makes the husband and wife think about their relationship

== Cast ==
- Valentina Telichkina as Nina
- Sergey Shakurov as Pavel Alekseyevich
- Nikita Mikhalkov as Boris Petrovich
- Mikhail Semakov as Ivan
- Vsevolod Shilovsky as Mitrofanych
- Oleg Golubitsky as Nikolay Nikitenko
- Tatyana Konyukhova as Varya Nikitenko
- Ekaterina Sukhanova as Lena
- Olga Gobzeva as Asya
- Viktor Uralskiy as Viktor Sergunov
