= Tsar Ivan the Terrible =

- Russian: Царь Иван Грозный
- Directed by: Gennady Vasilyev
- Written by: Valentin Ezhov; Aleksei Tolstoy; Gennady Vasilyev
- Produced by: Ismail Tagi-Zade
- Starring: Kakhi Kavsadze; Igor Talkov; Larisa Shakhvorostova; Stanislav Lyubshin; Andrey Martynov
- Cinematography: Boris Bondarenko
- Music by: Aleksey Rybnikov
- Production company: Tiskino
- Release date: 1991
- Running time: 137 min.
- Country: Soviet Union
- Language: Russian

Tsar Ivan the Terrible (Russian: Царь Иван Грозный, romanized: Tsar Ivan Groznyy) is a 1991 Soviet drama film directed by Gennady Vasilyev. It is based on Alexey Tolstoy's novel "Prince Serebrenni"

The film tells about Ivan the Terrible and his brutal rule of Russia. But even during the darkest times, there are always such people as Prince Serebrenni or Morozov.

== Plot ==
Upon returning to his homeland, Prince Serebryany discovers that during his absence, Tsar Ivan the Terrible has instituted the oppressive *oprichnina*, granting his oprichnik enforcers unchecked power to commit atrocities in the name of the crown. While traveling, Serebryany intervenes to protect peasants under attack from the oprichniki, also freeing two prisoners captured by bandits. Upon arriving in Moscow, he learns that his beloved Elena was forced into marriage with the disgraced old nobleman Druzina Morozov to escape the advances of the brutal oprichnik Prince Vyazemsky, who is consumed by unrequited love for her. Vyazemsky, in his desperation, resorts to sorcery to win her affection, consulting a miller reputed to practice dark magic. Meanwhile, Serebryany, expecting to face punishment for his defiance, appears before Ivan but is surprisingly spared due to the intercession of the tsar’s trusted advisors, Boris Godunov and Maxim Skuratov, the son of the feared oprichnik leader Maluta Skuratov.

The tensions among Ivan’s inner circle deepen as Vyazemsky, Skuratov, and Fyodor Basmanov vie for power, weaving a web of accusations and betrayal. Vyazemsky, with the tacit approval of the tsar, attacks Morozov’s home, abducting Elena and assaulting her, but she escapes and seeks refuge in a convent. Basmanov, fearing his waning favor with the tsar, accuses Vyazemsky of practicing witchcraft to harm Ivan while secretly acquiring a protective talisman from the same sorcerer. Skuratov, in turn, implicates Basmanov in treachery, further stoking Ivan’s paranoia. Plagued by visions of his misdeeds and haunted by the memory of his late wife Anastasia, Ivan wavers between remorse and cruelty. Serebryany, arrested for attacking oprichniki, is freed by grateful outlaws who name him their leader. He convinces them to abandon banditry and join the fight against invading Tatars, ultimately achieving a hard-won victory in battle.

Morozov, having survived Vyazemsky's assault, demands justice. Ivan decrees that the matter will be resolved through trial by combat, and Morozov's champion prevails. The tsar orders Vyazemsky’s execution, attributing to him the accusations of witchcraft. However, Ivan, unwilling to fully absolve Morozov, humiliates him by appointing him court jester. When Morozov openly condemns Ivan’s tyranny, he too is sentenced to death. Encouraged by Skuratov, the tsar also turns against Basmanov, sentencing him to execution, though his life is ultimately spared through the intervention of a holy fool. Meanwhile, Serebryany races to find Elena, only to discover that the trials she endured have led her to take monastic vows. Devastated, he is left in despair, while Ivan’s oppressive rule continues to cast a shadow over the land.

== Cast ==
- Kakhi Kavsadze as Tsar Ivan the Terrible
- Igor Talkov as Prince Serebrenni
- Larisa Shakhvorostova as Yelena (as Larisa Totunova)
- Stanislav Lyubshin as Morozov
- Andrey Martynov as Malyuta Skuratov
- Andrey Sokolov as Vyazemsky
- Dmitri Pisarenko as Fyodor Basmanov
- Andrey Tolubeyev as Boris Godunov
- Nikolay Kryuchkov as Korshin
- Vladimir Antonik as Persten
- Valery Garkalin as Vaska Gryaznoy
- Galiks Kolchitsky as Philip II, Metropolitan of Moscow (voiced by Rogvold Sukhoverko)
- Sergei Kolesnikov as Khlopko, the robber
- Ivan Ryzhov as the miller-sorcerer
- Zoya Buryak as Pasha
- Stefaniya Stanyuta as Anufrievna
- Valentina Titova as abbess of the monastery
- Olga Drozdova as Anastasia Romanovna
- Nikolay Smorchkov as archer
