= Eldor Urazbayev =

Soviet film director (1940–2012)

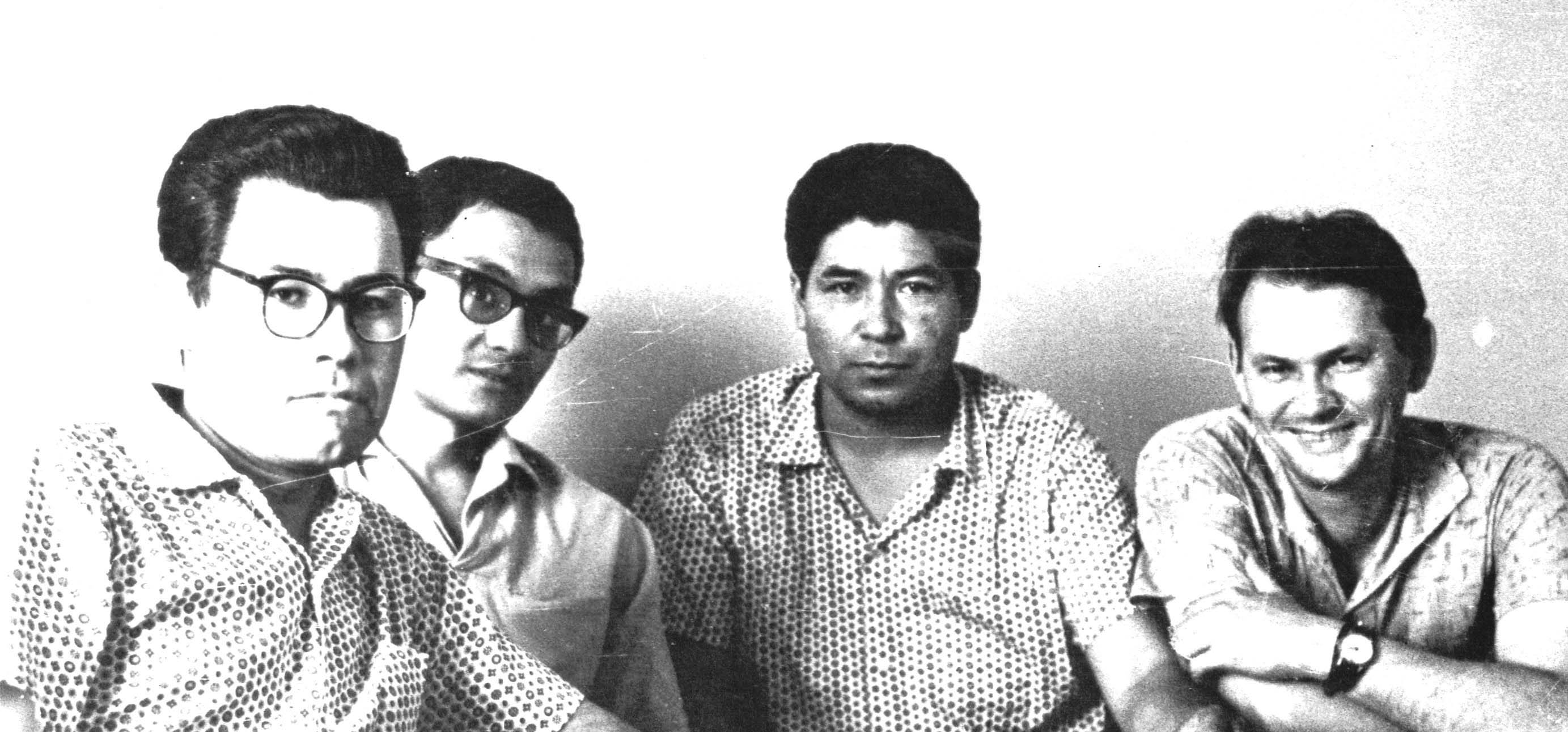
Eldor Urazbayev (second left) in 1967

Eldor Magomatovich Urazbayev (Russian: Эльдор Магоматович Уразбаев; 11 October 1940 – 21 February 2012) was a Soviet, Kazakhstani, and Russian film director, screenwriter and film producer. He was honored with the title, Honored Worker of Culture of the Russian Federation in 1998.

== Early life and education ==
Urazbayev born 11 October 1940, Tashkent, Uzbek SSR. He graduated from the Physics and Mathematics MSU 1963 High Courses for Scriptwriters and Film Directors in Moscow, the studio Alov and Naumov in 1972.

== Career ==
Worked as an assistant director in the Shaken Aymanov at the studio Kazakhfilm. After the tragic death Aymanova withdrew continuation of the acclaimed film Shaken End of Ataman, Trans-Siberian Express by script of Adabashyan, Mikhalkov and Konchalovsky. For a successful movie everybody got the Kazakh SSR State Prize in 1978.

In 1982 he entered into a second marriage to actress Natalya Arinbasarova, which was shot in Trans-Siberian Express.

Since 1982 as well the head of the First Creative Association Gorky Film Studio, the 1987 a art director of creative association TVK (TeleVideoKino) of the same studio. Since 1995 a board member of Gorky Film Studio.

== Awards and recognition ==
- Winner of State Prize Kazakh SSR (1978)
- Honored Worker of Culture of the Russian Federation (1998)

== Filmography ==
=== Director ===
- 1978 – Trans-Siberian Express, Транссибирский экспресс
- 1979 – Tailcoat for Scapegrace
- 1981 – Look Both!, Смотри в оба!
- 1982 – Traffic Inspector
- 1986 – One Second for a Feat
- 1987 – Visit to Minotaur
- 1993 – Tram hullabaloo or Buhtybarahty
- 1994 – Hagi-Tragger, Хаги-Траггер
- 2001 – Master of the Empire
- 2002 – Female Logic
- 2002 – Female Logic 2
- 2003 – Children of own
- 2004 – Wealth
- 2006 – Varenka
- 2009 – Bottlenose Jump

=== Actor ===
- 1983 – Love. Waiting. Lena as geologist
- 1995 – The Crusader as Ergen
- 2001 – Boss Lady as Timur Khakimovich Kenzhitaev

=== Writer ===
- 1990 – Hamlet of Suzaku, or Mamaia Caro
- 1992 – Ariel

== See also ==
- Cinema of Kazakhstan
- List of Kazakhstani films
