= Lyubov Tolkalina =

Russian theater and film actress (born 1978)

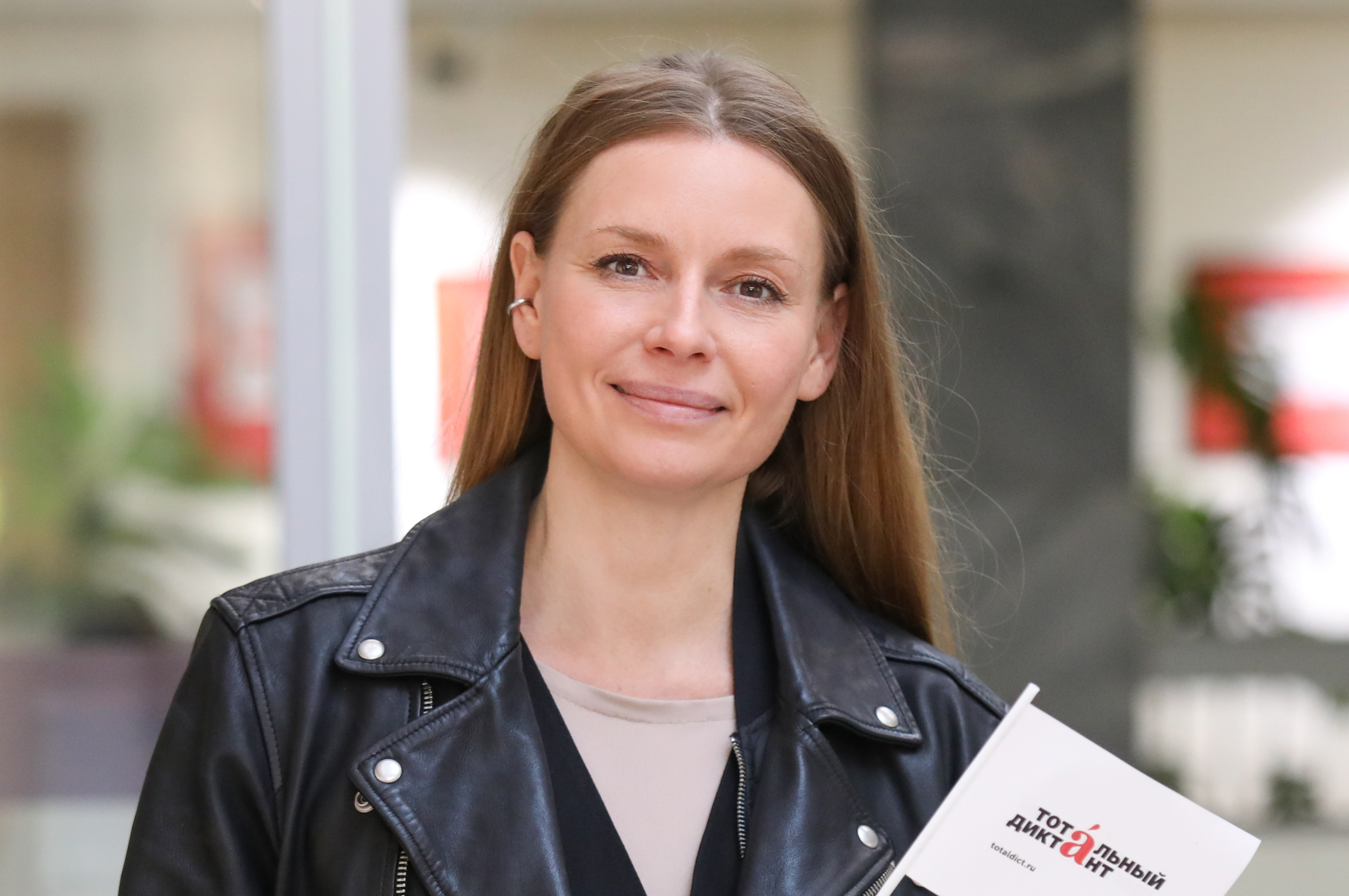
- 2024
- Born: Lyubov Nikolaevna Tolkalina; 16 February 1978 (age 48); Mikhailovka, Ryazan Oblast, Russian SFSR, Soviet Union
- Occupation: Actress
- Years active: 1999–present
- Children: 1

Lyubov Nikolaevna Tolkalina (Russian: Любо́вь Никола́евна Толка́лина; born 5 February 1978) is a Russian theater and film actress.

== Biography ==
In 1999 she graduated from the Theatre Faculty of the National Institute of Cinematography (aka VGIK).

From 1999 to 2003 she was an actress at the Theatre of Russian Army. She played Sarah in "Ivanov" by Chekhov (1999) and Desdemona in "Othello" by William Shakespeare (2000).

In 2002 she acquired greater popularity through her role in the action movie "Anti-Killer" and its sequel. She had roles in several television series. She is known outside Russia by her roles in Matroesjka's, a television series on human trafficking, and in the tragi-comedy Ya tebya lyublyu / You I Love from 2004. In this movie by Olga Stolpovskaja and Dmitry Troitsky she played the role of Vera, a woman who is confronted with the homosexual relationship of her friend. The gay and bisexual theme of the movie caused fuss in Russia.

She is married to the Russian director Egor Konchalovsky. They have a daughter, Masha.

== Filmography ==
Year	Title	Role	Notes
1999	Zatvornik	Irina	
2000	Vasilisa	countess	
2002	Antikiller	Lyuba	
2002	Line protection	Ekaterina Tropinina	TV series
2003	Red Serpent	Girl in the bar	
2003	Mail Order Bride	Dancer at End	
2003	Antikiller 2: Antiterror	Lyuba	
2004	You I Love	Vera Kirillova	
2004	Slushatel	Marina	
2005	Talisman of love	Olga Uvarova	TV series
2005	Matroesjka's	Olga	TV series
2005	Escape	Tatyana	
2007	Kavkaz	Sofya	
2007	Let's play	Lera Izotova	
2007	Konservy	Olga	
2007	Zastava	Katerina Klemyonova	Mini-Series
2007	Otkroyte, Ded Moroz!	Zhenya	TV
2008	Fotograf	Alisa	
2008	Once Upon a Time in the Provinces	Elena Sergeevna	
2008	Shalnoy angel	Valentina	TV series
2009	The road, leading to happiness	Zhanna	TV
2009	Uchastkovaya	Lilya	TV series
2009	Bride at any Cost	Mironova	
2009	Zapreshchennaya realnost	Polina	
2009	The capital sin	madame Anna	
2010	Farther - love	Elza Sorokina	TV
2010	Kompensatsiya	Olga	TV series
2020	Legends of Petersburg. Time key	Irena, Andrey's ex-girlfriend	
2021	Happy End	Polina	TV series
