= Bride at Any Cost =

2009 film by Dimitri Grachov

Bride at any Cost
- Directed by: Dimitri Grachov
- Written by: Yuri Patrenin
- Produced by: Ruben Dishdishyan; Anna Melikyan
- Starring: Pavel Volya; Maxim Kostromykin; Lyubov Tolkalina
- Cinematography: Ivan Gudkov
- Music by: Maxim Golovin
- Production companies: Central Partnership; Magnum
- Release date: 2009
- Running time: 97 minutes
- Country: Russia
- Language: Russian

Bride at any Cost (Russian: Невеста любой ценой, romanized: Nevesta lyuboi tsenoi) is a 2009 Russian sex comedy film directed by Dimitri Grachov.

== Plot ==
The protagonist is a successful businessman and an ingenious womanizer who is well-versed in women's psychology. To earn a promotion, he comes into contact with a dangerous businessman with a criminal past, but during negotiations, not keeping his temper, easily seduces his girlfriend, and coming out of her place in the morning, comes across the driver's chauffeur. He faces grave danger if he fails to secure an alibi in the form of a bride.

== Cast ==
- Pavel Volya - Stas
- Maxim Kostromykin - Kostik
- Lyubov Tolkalina - Mironova
- Olga Shelest - Mila
- Alexander Samoylenko - Treschev
- Vitaliy Khayev - Chernov
- Oksana Kutuzova - Lyuba Smirnova, the girl Chernova
- Elena Tashaeva - Anya
- Mariya Shalayeva - Karina
- Tatyana Gevorkyan - Tanya
- Alexey Malkov - Owl
- Natalia Rychkova - Olga
- Ksenia Khudoba - Svetlana
- Sergey Larin - friend of Karina
- Aleksandra Rebenok - Marina
