= Lenin in Paris =

Lenin in Paris (Ленин в Париже)
- Directed by: Sergei Yutkevich; Leonid Eidlin
- Written by: Yevgeny Gabrilovich; Sergei Yutkevich
- Starring: Yuri Kayurov; Claude Jade; Vladimir Antonik; Pavel Kadochnikov
- Music by: Grigory Frid
- Production company: Mosfilm
- Release date: 18 October 1981
- Running time: 106 minutes
- Country: Soviet Union
- Language: Russian

Lenin in Paris (Russian: Ленин в Париже, romanized: Lenin v Parizhe) is a Soviet biopic directed by Sergei Yutkevich in 1981 on Mosfilm.

== Synopsis ==
Russian revolutionary Vladimir Lenin spent four years in Paris (1909–1912), and this historical docudrama explores those years with a certain amount of humor. Lenin is shown visiting with friends, the meetings with his later mistress Inessa Armand (in the movie she is in love with a young communist, Trofimov), while several of his philosophical views and economic and political theories are mouthed by a former colleague who narrates the film and brings the material into the present.

== Cast ==
- Yuri Kayurov as Vladimir Lenin
- Claude Jade as Inessa Armand
- Vladimir Antonik as Aleksandr Trofimov
- Valentina Svetlova as Nadezhda Krupskaya
- Pavel Kadochnikov as Paul Lafargue
- Antonina Maksimova as Laura Lafargue
- Boris Ivanov as Jacob Zhitomirsky
- Sergei Pozharsky as Montéhus
- Albert Filozov as leader of the anarchists
- Yelena Koreneva as singer at Montéhus (singing voice by Carolyn Claire)
- Galina Belyayeva as student
- Sergei Prokhanov as courier
- Anatoly Adoskin as agitator-menshevik
- Olegar Fedoro as Montmarte painter
