= On the Moon (film) =

- Directed by: Egor Konchalovsky
- Written by: Milena Fadeyeva; Alexey Poyarkov
- Produced by: Stanislav Govorukhin; Ekaterina Maskina
- Starring: Ivan Arkhangelsky; Vitali Kishchenko; Aleksandr Baluev; Fyodor Bavtrikov; Stepan Lapin; Varvara Komarova; Seydulla Moldakhanov; Vladimir Afanasyev
- Cinematography: Anton Antonov
- Edited by: Vertikal
- Music by: Viktor Sologub
- Release date: February 27, 2020
- Country: Russia
- Language: Russian

On the Moon (Russian: На Луне) is a 2020 Russian adventure thriller film directed by Egor Konchalovsky. It was theatrically released in Russia on February 27, 2020.

== Plot ==
The film tells about the son of an influential man who, during a night race, accidentally hits a pedestrian, as a result of which his father sends him to the northern regions.

== Cast ==
- Ivan Arkhangelsky as Gleb
- Vitali Kishchenko as Vitaly Sorokin
- Aleksandr Baluev
- Fyodor Bavtrikov as Bob
- Stepan Lapin as Kir
- Varvara Komarova as Nastya
- Seydulla Moldakhanov
- Vladimir Afanasyev
