= Tailcoat for Scapegrace =

- Directed by: Eldor Urazbayev
- Written by: Arkady Krasil'shchikov
- Starring: Mikhail Egorov; Viktor Ilichyov
- Cinematography: Vladimir Archangel
- Production company: Gorky Film Studio
- Release date: 1979
- Running time: 67 min.
- Country: Soviet Union

Tailcoat for Scapegrace (Russian: Фрак для шалопая, romanized: Frak dlya shalopaya) is a 1979 Soviet children's adventure film directed by Eldor Magomatovich Urazbayev, with script by Arkadi Krasilschikov.

== Plot ==
A random event brought two completely different people together: a schoolboy, Zhenya Grachev and a former locksmith who is now a crane driver - Zhora Myakishev. The boy escaped from the camp to see his brother who is serving in the army. Myakishev stole a car with a watering depot to arrange rain for filmmakers who rented him a dress suit.

Both are hiding from the police, but by inadvertence, Myakishev specifically is entrusted with accompanying the caught boy to the city. When they get to know each other closer, these different people become good friends.

The tailcoat which was obtained with difficulty, must transform George Myakishev into a gentleman. During the televised TV finals of the competitive ballroom dancing he can finally prove to the girl he likes that he is not such a scapegrace as everyone thinks he is.

== Cast ==
- Mikhail Yegorov as Yevgeny Grachyov
- Viktor Ilichyov as Georgy Myakishev
- Leonid Kuravlyov as the police captain Deev
- Alexander Lebedev as police sergeant
- Artyom Karapetyan as Vasily Petrovich Gromoboev
- Tatyana Tashkova as Light
- Antonina Bogdanova as Mary M., Grandma Amy
- Elizaveta Nikischihina as Vovik's mother
- Nikolai Parfyonov as the guard in couture
- Vladimir Tikhonov asKondakov's friend Amy
- Vladimir Gerasimov as policeman
- Natalia Kaznacheyeva as Pioneer Khokhlakova
- Nikholay Pogodin as Taxi Drivercargo
- Maxim Puchkov as a pioneer of the third squad
- Yevgeny Gurov as passenger in train

== Crew ==
- Written by: Arkady Krasilshchikov
- Director: Eldor Urazbayev
- Director of Photography: Vladimir Archangel
- Composer: Edward Hagagortyan
- Art Director: Halina Anfilova
- Director: A. Becker
- Operator: E. Tafel
- Sound: AP Drozdov
- Conductor: M. Nersesian
- Costume designer: O. Kochetov
- Makeup artist: C. Kupershmidt
- Installation: I. Dorofeev
- Editor: V. Kibalnikova
- Combination of shooting:
  - Operator: Yu Ivanov
  - Artist: VA Rebrov
- Choreography: G. Gorohovnikov
- Director: A. Kravetsky
