= The Big Exchange =

- Russian: Менялы
- Directed by: Georgiy Shengeliya
- Written by: Aleksey Timm
- Produced by: Nikolai Karachentsov; Leonid Yarmolnik; Sergey Stepanchenko; Olga Kabo as Masha; Natalya Gundareva
- Starring: Vladimir Ilyin; Andrey Ponomaryov; Vadim Zakharchenko; Yuri Gorin; Valentina Telichkina
- Cinematography: Yakov Poselsky
- Edited by: Vera Ostrinskaya
- Music by: Georgi Movsesyan
- Release date: 1992
- Countries: Russia; United States
- Language: Russian

The Big Exchange (Russian: Менялы) is a 1992 Russian-American comedy film directed by Georgiy Shengeliya.

== Plot ==
The plot centers on the 1961 monetary reform in the Soviet Union. This involved the denomination of all currency 10:1; conspicuously, the copper kopecks (1/100 of a ruble) were excluded from the exchange due to the expense of re-minting them. Thus, effectively making them 10 times more valuable. The protagonists of the movie are tasked by a Soviet government functionary (who is also a secret millionaire) to enact a get-rich scheme which involves them touring the country and exchanging the old paper banknotes, soon to be on their way out, for small copper coins. The film then deals with their misadventures on the road.

== Cast ==
- Vladimir Ilyin as Babaskin
- Andrey Ponomaryov as Dzhora Grakin
- Vadim Zakharchenko as Ignatyevich
- Yuri Gorin
- Valentina Telichkina as Zoya Aleksandrovna
- Oksana Mysina as Lenochka Grakina
- Renat Davletyarov as First persecutor
- Nail Idrisov as Second persecutor
- Oleg Durygin as Third persecutor
- Alla Meshcheryakova as Serafima Maksimovna
