= Egor Konchalovsky =

Russian film director, actor, screenwriter and producer

- Егор Кончаловский
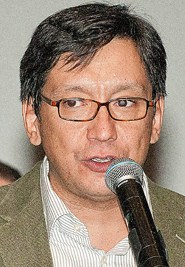
- Konchalovsky in 2010
- Born: Egor Andreevich Konchalovsky; 15 January 1966 (age 60); Moscow, Soviet Union (now Russia)
- Citizenship: Russian Federation
- Occupations: film director, screenwriter, producer
- Spouse: Lyubov Tolkalina
- Parents: Andrei Konchalovsky; Natalya Arinbasarova

Egor Andreevich Konchalovsky (Russian: Его́р Андреевич Кончало́вский; born 15 January 1966) is a Russian film director, screenwriter, and producer. He is the son of director Andrei Konchalovsky and actress Natalya Arinbasarova.

== Biography ==
Egor Konchalovsky was born on 15 January 1966 in Moscow.

He studied at the international school St Clare's at Oxford and at Kensington Business College. He holds an MA in Art History from the University of Cambridge. He worked as an assistant director in the films Homer and Eddie, Tango and Cash, The Inner Circle. In 1992, together with Andrey Razenkov, he created an advertising studio "PS TVC" (Partner Studio TVCommercials). Participated in the delivery of over a hundred promotional video clips. In 1999, he made his debut as a film director.

== Filmography ==
- Zatvornik (1999)
- Antikiller (2002)
- Antikiller 2: Antiterror (2003)
- Escape (2005)
- Tins (2007)
- May 9. Personal attitude (2008)
- Roses for Elza (2009)
- Our Masha and the Magic Nut (2009)
- Moscow, I Love You (2009)
- Returning to the 'A' (2011)
- On the Moon (2020)
- My Father Is a Chieftain (2022)
