= Happy End (TV series) =

- Genre: Drama; Comedy
- Written by: Yevgeny Sangadzhiev; Vladimir Vasilyev; Mikhail Zubko; Anastasia Koretskaya; Aglaya Smirnova (trainee); Olga Mitina (trainee)
- Directed by: Yevgeny Sangadzhiev
- Starring: Denis Vlasenko; Lena Tronina; Lyubov Tolkalina; Alexander Gorchilin
- Music by: Oleg Karpachyov
- Country of origin: Russia
- Original language: Russian
- No. of seasons: 1
- No. of episodes: 8

Production
- Executive producer: Olga Mitina
- Producers: Vyacheslav Murugov; Aleksey Kiselyov; Sergey Bondarchuk; Maksim Rybakov; Anastasia Koretskaya
- Cinematography: Valery Makhmudov
- Running time: 35 minutes
- Production companies: NMG Studio; Videoprokat Studio

Original release
- Network: more.tv
- Release: April 1 – May 20, 2021

Happy End is a Russian drama television series directed by Yevgeny Sangadzhiev. The series explores the webcam modeling industry and premiered on April 1, 2021, on the streaming service more.tv. The lead roles are played by Denis Vlasenko and Lena Tronina. The show received critical acclaim for its performances and bold subject matter.

== Plot ==
The series follows two young people, Vlad and Lera, who urgently move from their provincial hometown to Moscow. They become involved in the world of webcam modeling and pornography, which puts their romantic relationship under severe strain.

== Cast ==
- Denis Vlasenko as Vlad
- Lena Tronina as Lera
- Alexander Gorchilin as Max
- Lyubov Tolkalina as Polina
- Daniil Vorobyov as Edik
- Lukerya Ilyashenko as Yana
- Alexey Agranovich as Lera's father
- Yevgenia Dobrovolskaya as Vlad's mother
- Alexandra Rebenok as Sasha
- Aleksey Makarov as Dmitry

== Production and reception ==
A pilot episode featuring Pavel Tabakov and Safiya Yarullina was originally directed by Roman Prygunov. The project was later rebooted with a new creative team. Happy End became the directorial debut of Yevgeny Sangadzhiev, with Denis Vlasenko and Lena Tronina cast in the lead roles.

The eight-episode season premiered on April 1, 2021, on more.tv. Singer Manizha made her debut as the series’ music producer.

Critics praised the performances of Tronina and Vlasenko and described the series as bold and boundary-breaking for Russian television. Some reviewers criticized the show for excessive explicitness and for romanticizing the webcam industry.

== Future ==
On February 17, 2022, the series was officially renewed for a second season, though production never began.

On September 4, 2025, it was reported that Happy End had been removed from all Russian streaming platforms.
