= Novosibirsk State Agricultural University =

Agricultural university in Novosibirsk, Russia

Coordinates: 55.0283°N 82.9803°E

Federal State Educational Institution of Higher Education "Novosibirsk State Agrarian University"
- Федеральное государственное бюджетное образовательное учреждение высшего образования "Новосибирский государственный аграрный университет"
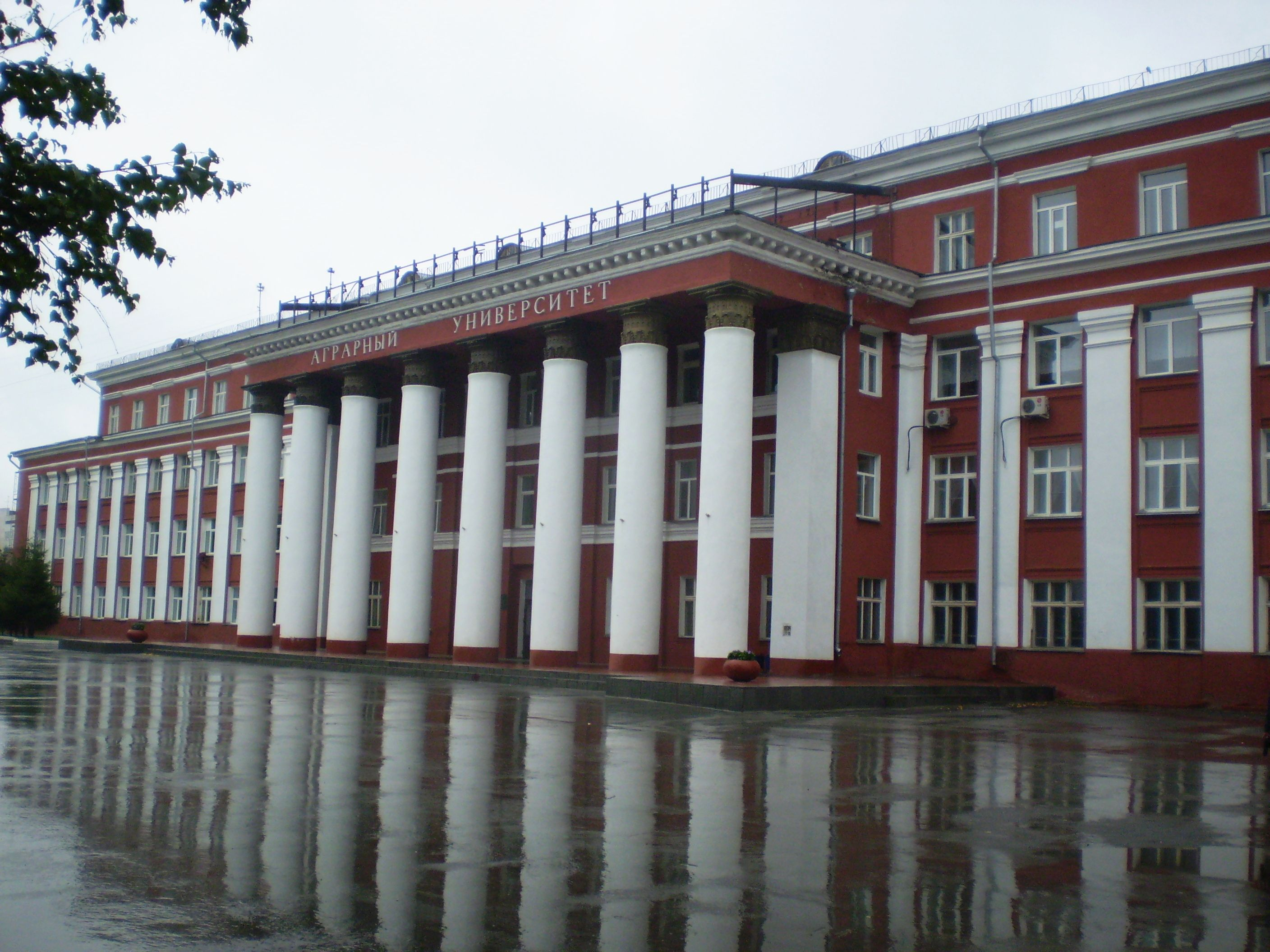
- Former name: Federal State Educational Institution of Higher Professional Education "Novosibirsk State Agrarian University"
- Type: State university
- Established: 1936
- Rector: Evgeny Rudoy
- Administrative staff: 550
- Students: 6200 (full-time); 6000 (part-time)
- Location: Novosibirsk, Russia
- Campus: Urban
- Language: Russian, English, German
- Website: edubiotech.ru

Novosibirsk State Agricultural University (Russian: Новосибирский государственный аграрный университет; abbreviated as НГАУ, NGAU) is a state university located in Novosibirsk, Russia. It was founded in 1936.

== History ==
On November 14, 1935, Mikhail Alexandrovich Chernov, People's Commissariat for Agriculture of the USSR, issued order no. 2789 on the opening of an agricultural institute in Novosibirsk.

On September 1, 1936, the doors of the Novosibirsk Agricultural Institute (Russian: Новосибирский аграрный институт) were opened. There were 6 departments with 18 teachers.

In 1941, the first graduation of highly qualified specialists took place.

In 1991, after the state certification, the institute was renamed the Agrarian University.

== Rectors ==
Past rectors of the university have included:

- Boris Yakovlevich Grinberg (1936–1937)
- Pavel Nikolayevich Prutovykh (1938–1939)
- Nikolai Ivanovich Zhukovsky (1939–1942)
- Timofey Leontyevich Basyuk (1942–1945)
- Grigory Yakovlevich Zvonkovich (1946–1953)
- Nikolai Pavlovich Smirnov (1953–1954)
- Ivan Matveyevich Leonov (1955–1956)
- Aleksandr Ivanovich Ovsyannikov (1956–1960)
- Zakhar Dmitriyevich Krasikov (1961–1966)
- Ivan Ivanovich Gudilin (1966–1986)
- Anatoly Fyodorovich Kondratov (1986–2009)
- Aleksandr Sergeyevich Denisov (2009–2020)
- Evgeny Vladimirovich Rudoy (2020–present)

== Notable graduates ==
Five graduates of the university have been awarded the title of Hero of Socialist Labour:

- Vladimir Iosifovich Fofanov
- Ivan Ivanovich Leunov
- Vladimir Ksenofontovich Mrachek
- Vasily Petrovich Demidenko
- Yury Fyodorovich Bugakov

Another notable graduate was Yakov Tikhonovich Novichenko, a Soviet military officer, who was awarded the North Korean equivalent, Hero of Labour, in 1984, becoming the only non-Korean to receive it.
