= Jamilya (film) =

1969 film by Irina Poplavskaya

- Russian: Джамиля
- Directed by: Irina Poplavskaya; Sergei Yutkevich
- Written by: Chingiz Aitmatov
- Starring: Natalya Arinbasarova; Suymenkul Chokmorov; Nasreddin Dubashev; Aliman Zhankorozova; Altynbek Kenzhekov
- Cinematography: Kadyrzhan Kydrylaliyev
- Edited by: Yelena Surazhskaya
- Music by: Nikolai Sidelnikov
- Release date: 1968
- Running time: 76 minute
- Country: Soviet Union
- Language: Russian

Jamilya (Russian: Джамиля) is a 1968 Soviet war romance film directed by Sergei Yutkevich and Irina Poplavskaya.

The film is based on the 1958 novel Jamila by Chingiz Aitmatov.

== Plot ==
The film is told from the point of view of the narrator, an artist, who paints scenes of rural Kyrgyz life. These scenes are based on his childhood, which he reflects back upon for the bulk of the movie. The main part of the film takes place during the Great Patriotic War in what is now Kyrgyzstan. Jamilya, a young woman, follows her parents orders by marrying Sadik, a man who she does not love. After marrying Jamilya, Sadik lives with her for only four months, then he is taken to the front, to fight in World War II. During this period, women, old people and children went to the fields and sent wheat to the front lines where the men were fighting. Jamilya misses her husband. However, Jamilya falls in love with the front-line soldier Daniyar, who has already returned from the war. After Sadik is wounded, he writes in a letter that he is returning home in two months, which makes everyone happy, except for Jamilya and Daniyar who are forced to confront the reality of their relationship.

== Cast ==
- Natalya Arinbasarova as Jaamilya
- Suymenkul Chokmorov as Daniyar
- Nasreddin Dubashev
- Aliman Zhankorozova as Dzhanyl
- Altynbek Kenzhekov as Sadyk
- Mukhtar Bakhtygereyev as Osmon
- Bolot Beyshenaliev as Khudozhnik
- Chingiz Aitmatov as Narrator (voice)
- Nasyr Kitayev as Orosmat
