= Valentina Telichkina =

Soviet-Russian actress (born 1945)

- Валентина Теличкина
- Born: Valentina Ivanovna Telichkina; January 10, 1945 (age 81) village Krasnoye, Arzamassky District, Gorky Region, RSFSR, USSR
- Occupation: Actress
- Years active: 1965 — present
- Awards: Honored Artist of RSFSR (1976); Lenin Komsomol Prize (1976); Vasilyev Brothers State Prize of the RSFSR (1985); People's Artist of the Russian Federation (2009)

Valentina Ivanovna Telichkina (Russian: Валенти́на Ива́новна Тели́чкина; born January 10, 1945) is a Soviet and Russian film and stage actress. People's Artist of the Russian Federation (2009).

== Biography ==
Valentina Telichkina was born January 10, 1945 (the day of the forty-year anniversary of his mother). She was the seventh born, the youngest child of her parents.

Valentina began to show her artistic talent from early childhood - singing ditties at concerts in the kindergarten. In high school she actively participated in amateur performances: singing, dancing, reading poetry and short stories, playing guitar in a string orchestra. So after graduating from high school she went to Moscow and immediately entered VGIK, the studio Vladimir Belokurov's, where she studied from 1963 to 1967.

Since 1967, Valentina Telichkina is an actress of the National Film Actors' Theatre.

Valentina Telichkina debuted in cinema after her second year of studies at the institute, in 1965, she appeared in a small role in the film Taiga Troopers by directors Vladimir Krasnopolsky and Valery Uskov.

In 1967, she starred in the film by Sergei Gerasimov The Journalist. Telichkina considered this role to be the most important one in life, since it was her cinematic breakthrough.

Valentina Telichkina's filmography contains more than 60 works.

In her spare time, she enjoys the act of painting. The actress also, engages in the hobbies of reading and gardening.

For statements against the interests of national security she was banned from entering Ukraine.

== Family ==
In 1980, Valentina married an architect, Vladimir Nikolaevich Gudkov. Together they have a son, Ivan Vladimirovich Gudkov (born 1979), a graduate of MGIMO.

== Selected filmography ==
- 1967 — The Journalist as Valya
- 1968 — Unusual Exhibition as Glafira Ogurtsova
- 1969 — Zigzag of Success as Olya
- 1969 — By the Lake as Valya Korolkova
- 1970 — Nachalo as Valya
- 1972 — Train Stop — Two Minutes as Alyona
- 1975 — It Can't Be! as Catherine, Zavitushkin's bride
- 1976 — Po sekretu vsemu svetu as Asya Korableva
- 1978 — Five Evenings as Zoya, from grocery clerk
- 1979 -Married for the first time as Galina
- 1981 — A Painter's Wife Portrait as Nina
- 1983 — Vassa as Servant
- 1983 — Crazy Day of Engineer Barkasov as Nanny
- 1986 — Through Main Street with an Orchestra as Zhenya, Igor's wife
- 1987 — Fun Young as Nina
- 1988 — Where is the Nophelet? as female stranger on the bus
- 1994 — Tinkerbell as Maria Vasilievna
- 1992 — The Big Exchange as Zoya Aleksandrovna
- 1996 — The Magical Portrait as Ivan's mother
- 1998 — Classic as Irina
- 2002 — Brigada as Belov's mother
- 2005 — Yesenin as Tatiana Fyodorovna Titova, Sergei Yesenin's mother
- 2009 — Gogol. Nearest as Maria Ivanovna Gogol-Yanovskaya, Nikolai Gogol's mother
