= Andrey Martynov (actor) =

Soviet and Russian actor (born 1945)

- Born: 24 October 1945 (age 80); Ivanovo, Russian SFSR, Soviet Union
- Education: Russian Institute of Theatre Arts
- Occupation: Actor
- Years active: 1970–present

Andrey Leonidovich Martynov (Russian: Андре́й Леони́дович Марты́нов; born 24 October 1945) is a Soviet and Russian film and theater actor.

== Honors and awards ==
Martynov has received the People's Artist of Russia (1994) award. Previously, he has received the USSR State Prize (1975), the Vasilyev brothers State Prize of the RSFSR (1982), and the Lenin Komsomol Award (1974).

== Biography ==
=== Career ===
Andrey Martynov was born in Ivanovo, Russian SFSR, Soviet Union. In 1970 he graduated from the Russian Academy of Theatre Arts (GITIS). From 1970 he worked as an actor of the Moscow Youth Theatre, and in 1972 he became an actor of the Moscow Drama Theater on Malaya Bronnaya.

His debut in film was in the Stanislav Rostotsky movie The Dawns Here Are Quiet, which brought him nationwide acclaim. Since 1981, he has acted for the Gorky Film Studio.

=== Personal life ===
He was married to a German, Franziska Thun. He has a son, Alexander, and three grandchildren, who live in Germany.

== Filmography ==
- 1972 The Dawns Here Are Quiet as sergeant Fedot Vaskov
- 1973 Eternal Call as Kiryan Inyutin
- 1977 White Bim Black Ear as senior lieutenant, Andrey Leonidovich
- 1978 Captain's Daughter as Maksimych
- 1981 The last day facts as Kryakvin
- 1982 Vasily Buslaev as Akulov
- 1982 Crazy Day of Engineer Barkasov aa Slonyaev, poet
- 1985 Battle of Moscow as muscovites militia commander
- 1986 One Second for a Feat as Yakov Novichenko
- 1990 Nikolai Vavilov as Sergei Vavilov
- 1991 Tsar Ivan the Terrible as Malyuta Skuratov
- 1997 Magic Portrait as Tit
- 1997 Tsarevich Aleksey as Afanasich
- 1998 Mu-Mu as Gavrila Andreevich
- 1999 The President and His Granddaughter as episode
- 2003 Do not Get Used to Miracles as episode
- 2003 Black Mark aa politburo member Yakovlev
- 2004 Wealth as Pavel Blinov
