= Returning to the 'A' =

2011 film

- Directed by: Egor Konchalovsky
- Written by: Vladimir Moiseenko; Alexander Novototsky-Vlasov
- Produced by: Arman Asenov
- Starring: Seydulla Moldahanov; Denis Nikiforov; Farhat Abdraimov; Gosha Kutsenko; Andrey Smolyakov
- Cinematography: Anton Antonov
- Edited by: Ekaterina Pivneva; Alexey Miklashevskii
- Music by: Victor Sologub
- Production company: Kazakhfilm
- Release date: 2011
- Running time: 110 minutes
- Countries: Kazakhstan; Russia
- Language: Russian

Returning to the 'A' (Kazakh: А-ға оралу, romanized: A-ğa oralu; Russian: Возвращение в «А», romanized: Vozvrashchenie v "A") is a 2011 Kazakhstani drama film directed by Egor Konchalovsky. The film was selected as the Kazakhstani entry for the Best Foreign Language Film at the 84th Academy Awards, but it did not make the final shortlist.

== Plot ==
A young, creative team of TV Russian and Kazakh cinematographers are sent on a perilous journey from Almaty to Afghanistan to film a documentary film In the Footsteps of Alexander the Great. They are accompanied by a man who once fought on the land of Afghanistan and lost a leg in the fighting - Marat Ayumov. He is fluent in Persian, is familiar with the customs, traditions and Afghan laws. But no one knows that he served as a part of the Muslim battalion GRU Soviet Union under the command of legendary Afghan war Kara Major (Arman Asenov) and that he also has personal reasons to return to Afghanistan.

== Production ==
While the film takes place on the territory of Kazakhstan, Tajikistan and Afghanistan, all the shooting took place near Alma-Ata in Kazakhstan.

The film had several working titles: Afghan, Kara Major, Real Colonel; It was eventually titled Returning to the 'A'. In preparation for filming the filmmakers have reviewed a lot of documentaries about the war in Afghanistan. In one of them it talked about the closed Politburo meeting chaired by Leonid Brezhnev, which was held on 12 December 1979. In addition to Brezhnev it was attended by Suslov, Ustinov, Chernenko, Andropov and others. It was then that the final decision to send troops to Afghanistan, issued in the form of a secret decree № 176/125 of the CPSU called The situation in A. Later, the document was declassified.

== See also ==
- List of submissions to the 84th Academy Awards for Best Foreign Language Film
- List of Kazakhstani submissions for the Academy Award for Best Foreign Language Film
