= Tins (film) =

2007 Russian film

- DVD cover
- Directed by: Egor Konchalovsky
- Written by: Yuri Perov
- Starring: Marat Basharov; Aleksei Serebryakov; Sergey Shakurov; Sergey Veksler; Dmitry Nagiev
- Cinematography: Anton Antonov
- Release date: 25 January 2007
- Running time: 96 minutes
- Country: Russia
- Language: Russian

Tins (Tins, Russian: Консервы, romanized: Konservy) is a 2007 Russian film about a journalist who possesses information on uranium sales and is set up by his enemies and sent to prison. Initially the film was planned as a political thriller, but along the way it gained features of action with elements of mysticism and surrealism.

The title, which literally translates as "Canned Food", has multiple meanings. One was introduced by Varlam Shalamov in his tales about Gulag, and it was called "calf" – a younger convict accepted to escape team for food, as a walking piece of meat. Another meaning is an interpretation of the film's idea: human beings are "sealed" structures that open only in extreme situations. The third meaning has to do with actual canned meat taken for escape: in the movie these cans play an important part because of their unexpected content.

The film was shot in Crimea, Ukraine, where director Egor Konchalovsky had found locations for shootings of Siberian taiga, Ural mines and Moscow streets. Quarries in Inkerman were used as the set of a Ural prison camp.

Marat Basharov, playing the journalist, had his head shaven for the role, and Sergey Shakurov, playing criminal boss or "thief in the law", had his body tattooed.

== Plot ==
Igor Davidov, an international journalist, possesses dangerous information about high-ranking traitors, including an army general, a member of the State Duma and a well-known nuclear scientist who plan to sell weapons-grade uranium to a Middle East country.

The traitors realise that someone has leaked their plans. They trace the leak to Igor. The villainous General Astrahantsev kidnaps the children of loyal Commander Usoltsev, a veteran of the Chechnya war; the nuclear scientist is murdered. The conspirators succeed in framing Usoltsev and Davidov on charges of murder and drug dealing. Both men, who had not previously met, soon find themselves in a remote prison camp.

They try to discover the real reasons for their being in prison. Then with the help of criminals they escape from the camp to seek justice. They face many tests; not everyone will live through the experience.
