= Natalya Arinbasarova =

Russian actress

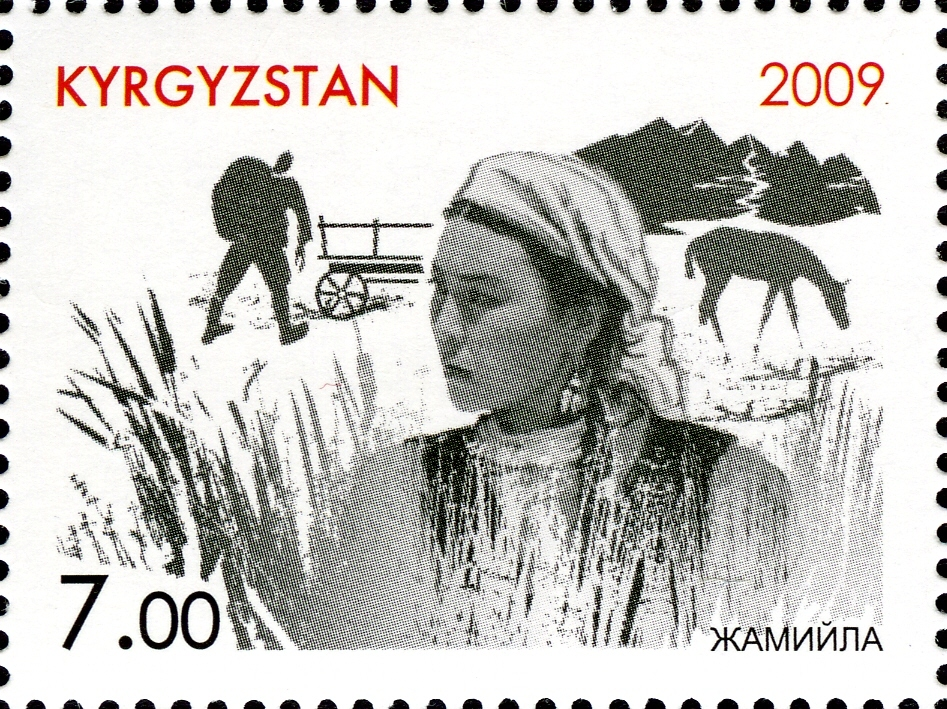
- Kyrgyzstani postage stamp featuring Arinbasarova
- Born: 24 September 1946 (age 80); Moscow, USSR
- Occupation: Actress
- Years active: 1965–present

Natalya Utevlevna Arinbasarova (Russian: Наталья Утевлевна Аринбасарова, Kazakh: Наталья Өтеуліқызы Орынбасарова; born 24 September 1946 in Moscow) is a Russian actress who appeared in more than thirty films since 1965. In 1979 Arinbasarova was named Honored Artist of the RSFSR and in the same year she received the USSR State Prize for her role in The Taste of Bread (1978).

== Life and career ==
Natalya Utevlevna Arinbasarova was born on September 24, 1946. Her father was Utevle Turemuratovich, a military man, a Kazakh by nationality. At the time of the birth of his daughter, he studied in Moscow at the Frunze Military Academy. Her mother was Maria Konstantinovna, née Zhukovskaya, from a family of Polish refugees during the First World War. Natalya's siblings were older brothers Yuri and Arsen, younger brother Mikhail, younger sister Tatyana.

After the father graduated from the Military Academy, the family moved several times from place to place, until finally, in 1956, he settled in Alma-Ata.

Natalya Arinbasarova was initially interested in dance. After watching a film in which an excerpt from the ballet "Swan Lake" was shown in her childhood, Natalya desired to become a professional ballerina. She studied at the Bolshoi Ballet Academy until 1964 and joined the dance troupe of Almaty Opera Theater upon graduation. In 1965, director Andrei Konchalovsky cast her in his feature directorial debut The First Teacher. For her performance as Altynai, a peasant girl who supports the Communist teacher in her village, Arinbasarova won the prize for Best Female Lead at the Venice Film Festival in 1966.

Arinbasarova, also enrolled in VGIK, where she studied in Sergei Gerasimov and Tamara Makarova's workshop, graduating in 1971. Gerasimov gave her the role of a young Kyrgyz ballet dancer in his contemporary epic By the Lake (1970). Her other important lead roles include the title role in the Chingiz Aitmatov adaptation Jamilya (1969) and the World War II heroine Manshuk Mamedova in The Song of Manshuk (1970) by Kazakh director Magit Begalin. Arinbasarova was cast by Tolomush Okeev in the social drama The Ulan (1977), by Polish filmmaker Jerzy Hoffman in Beautiful Stranger (1992), and by Ermek Shinarbaev in the Kazakh-French co-production A Tender Heart (1994). She also had a supporting role in the Kazakh picture Leila’s Prayer (2002), about a young girl living near the Semipalatinsk nuclear testing site.

== Personal life ==
In 1965 Natalya Arinbasarova married Konchalovsky, to whom she stayed married until 1969. They had one son, Egor who later also became a prominent film director.

She later remarried, to cinematographer Nikolai Dvigubskiy. They had a daughter, Katya Dvigubskaya, who later became an actress and film director. Arinbasarova married the third time to director Eldor Urazbayev, with whom she worked on several films. Arinbasarova retained good relationships with all her husbands, who supported her both children through their studies and film careers.

== Selected filmography ==
Film
Year	Title	Role	Notes
2011	Returning to the 'A' (Возвращение в "А")	grandma	
2005	Escape (Спасение)	director of children's home	
1989	Entrance to the Labyrinth (Вход в лабиринт)	Rashida Ramazanova	
1987	Visit to Minotaur (Визит к Минотавру)	Marina Kolesnikova	
1985	One Second for a Feat	Nurse	
1969	Jamilya (Джамиля)	Jamilya	
1967	By the Lake (У озера)	ballerina Katya Olzoeva	
1965	The First Teacher (Первый учитель)	Altynay	

== Awards ==
- Volpi Cup (Best actress) at the 1966 Venice Film Festival for The first teacher.
