= Sovetskaya Sibir =

Newspaper in Novosibirsk, Russia

Sovetskaya Sibir Советская Сибирь
- Founded: 18 September 1919; 106 years ago (officially)
- Language: Russian
- Website: www.sovsibir.ru

Sovetskaya Sibir (Russian: Советская Сибирь; "Soviet Siberia") is a newspaper published in Novosibirsk, Russia.

== History ==
At first the newspaper was published in Chelyabinsk on October 1, 1919. The first editor was V. I. Khotimsky (September 1919 – June 1920). It was the newspaper of the Sibrevkom.

From November 26, 1919, to June 12, 1921 "Sovetskaya Sibir" was published in Omsk. Then the editorial board of the newspaper moved to Novonikolayevsk (current Novosibirsk) together with Sibrevkom. The first issue of the Novikolayevsk newspaper was released on June 23, 1921.

== See also ==
- Vecherniy Novosibirsk
