= Savelyev =

Savelyev, also spelled as Savelev, Saveliev, or Saveljev (Russian: Савельев), or Savelyeva (feminine; Савельева), is a Russian surname that is derived from the male given name Savely and literally means Savely's. Notable people with the surname include:

- Aleksei Vitalyevich Savelyev (born 1977), Russian footballer who played for FC Torpedo Moscow and PFC CSKA Moscow
- Andrei Saveliyev (born 1962), Russian politician and a former member of the Russian State Duma
- Boris Savelev, (born 1948), Russian photographer
- Dmitry Savelyev (disambiguation), several people
- Galina Savelyeva (1928–2022), Russian gynaecologist
- Gennadi Saveliev, American Ballet Theatre soloist
- Ilya Savelev (born 1971), Russian volleyball player
- Larissa Saveliev (born 1969), Russian ballet dancer
- Ludmila Savelyeva (born 1942), Russian film actress and ballerina
- Oleg Savelyev (born 1965), Russian politician and deputy defense minister
- Sergey Savelyev (skier) (1948–2005), Russian cross country skier
- Sergey Savelyev (speed skater) (born 1972), Russian speed skater
- Sergey Vyacheslavovich Savelyev (born 1959), Russian scientist, evolutionist, paleoneurologist, author of the idea of cerebral sorting
- Viktor Savelyev (1928–2013), Russian surgeon
- Viktor Zakharevich Savelyev (1875–1943), Russian military officer
- Vitaly Savelyev (born 1954), Russian businessman
