= Eternal Call =

Soviet historical TV show (1976–1983)

- Вечный зов
- Genre: Historical drama
- Based on: Eternal Call by Anatoli Ivanov
- Directed by: Vladimir Krasnopolsky; Valery Uskov
- Original language: Russian
- No. of seasons: 2
- No. of episodes: 19

Original release
- Release: June 2, 1976 – May 20, 1983

Eternal Call (Russian: Вечный зов, romanized: Vechnyy zov) was a Soviet epic TV series. It was filmed by directors Vladimir Krasnopolsky and Valery Uskov based on the novel of the same name by Anatoli Ivanov at Mosfilm Studios. It ran from June 2, 1976, to May 20, 1983, on the Soviet Central Television.

== Plot ==
The series traces the fate of the Siberian family of Savelyevs from 1906 to the 1960s. It covers three wars, the Russian Revolution, the establishment of the Soviet Union, the era of Stalinism, etc.

=== Season 1 ===
The initial four episodes of the film delve into the formative years and early experiences of the main characters, shedding light on their upbringing and the pivotal role they played in the fight for the establishment of Soviet power in the rural regions of Siberia. The movie encompasses a comprehensive portrayal of the pre-revolutionary era, capturing the essence of the socio-political landscape and the tumultuous events that set the stage for the onset of the Russian Civil War.

The fifth to the eighth episodes delve into the arduous journey of collective farmers as they strive to build a better life in their village, guided by the unwavering leadership of Bolsheviks Polycarp Kruzhilin and Pankrat Nazarov. These episodes also shine a light on the enchanting tales of romance and the awe-inspiring endeavors of the Soviet people during the transformative period of the initial Five-year plans of the Soviet Union. In the midst of these circumstances, the individual stories of our protagonists begin to unravel. Anna, the daughter of the affluent Siberian businessman Kaftanov, finds herself compelled to join a partisan unit, driven by her unwavering love for Fyodor Savelyev. However, this decision comes at a high cost as she must confront and defy her father's disapproval of their relationship. The dramatic tale of Ivan Savelyev unfolds as he initially aligns himself with the White Bandits, engages in a forbidden affair with Anna, endures a period of incarceration, and ultimately finds his way back to his homeland.

In addition to portraying the initial days of the Great Patriotic War, the first season delves into the experiences of Semyon Savelyev and Kiryan Inyutin as they bravely venture to the front lines. Meanwhile, Yakov Aleynikov and Polycarp Kruzhilin, who have endured significant hardships prior to the war, find themselves confronted with intricate interpersonal challenges. Despite their past friendship being strained, the trials and tribulations of war serve as a catalyst for the restoration of their once-close bond.

The heroes of the movie focus all their efforts on restoring and launching a military plant in Shantarsk, which is responsible for supplying weapons to the front lines. The plant had to be evacuated due to the ongoing conflict, but now the heroes are determined to bring it back to its former glory and resume its crucial role in supporting the front.

The eleventh and twelfth episodes of this tale delve into the events that unfolded during the initial months of the Great Patriotic War, chronicling the fight against the encroaching Nazi invaders near Moscow. Taking center stage is the battle waged on the home front, where the determination to secure victory becomes the driving force behind the tireless efforts to supply the front lines with much-needed ammunition and the nation with an abundance of sustenance. This concerted endeavor is marked by a chorus of voices, emanating from every corner of society, proclaiming the resolute rallying cry: "All for the front! Everything for victory!" From the youngest to the oldest, individuals of all ages and walks of life unite in solidarity, ceaselessly toiling towards a shared goal – ensuring the triumph of their beloved homeland.

==== Episode 1: The Eldest Brother ====
It is 1906, pre-revolutionary Russia. In the distant and secluded village of Mikhailovka in Siberia, located in close proximity to Shantarsk (a town that serves as a fictional replica of Krasnoyarsk), a remarkable event unfolds as two comrades, Pankrat Nazarov and Demyan Inyutin, who had grown up together in this very village, make their triumphant return after fighting in the war against Japan. They had suffered serious injuries, with Pankrat being shot in the lung and Demyan losing a leg. Demyan, a hero with the Cross of Saint George, is disabled but does not want to be idle.

Demyan goes to Mikhail Lukich Kaftanov, a wealthy man in the village, offering to protect his valuable possessions, suggesting that having a vigilant and watchful "chain dog" would greatly assist in overseeing and safeguarding all aspects of the landowner's property. In fact, the village is frequently targeted by gypsies who steal horses, so Demyan's help is needed. Following a short period of contemplation, Kaftanov ultimately consents to the request. Pankrat, eager to secure employment, approaches Demyan in search of work. However, Demyan declines Pankrat's plea, asserting his own limited yet tangible authority.

Silanty Savelyev, a destitute peasant, has three sons - Anton, Fyodor, and Ivan. Anton, the eldest son, is discovered to be assisting the gypsies by leading them through the forest to avoid capture. However, Anton has dreams of leaving the village and going to the city, so he does not want to join the gypsies permanently. One day Silanty sends his sons Anton and Mitrofan to Novonikolayevsk (the present-day Novosibirsk). to secure a job at the railway depot. Anton's life is marked by recklessness, debauchery, and gambling. Mitrofan, guided by Ivan Mikhalych, and his companions engage in a clandestine existence. Anton reveals his involvement and asks to join the case. However, this decision exposes him to the world of underground activities orchestrated by the Russian Social Democratic Labour Party. Anton's recklessness and debauchery lead to his involvement in the clandestine activities.

One day, when Anton, along with Pyotr Polypov, also called Petka, who asked him to participate in a serious case, turns out to be "on the alert", gets into a police raid, and then into prison. As a result of the raid, Anton was detained and interrogated by Arnold Mikhalych Lakhnovsky, an investigator from Okhranka, the Security Department. The investigator tries to separate Anton and Petka, brutally beating one with a whip, and persuades the other promising to let him go back to his father. Petka's father, a shopkeeper, complains to Demyan that Antoshka from Mikhaylovka knocked his only heir off the right path.

Lakhnovsky presents Anton with the opportunity to betray the underground fighters, but Anton remains steadfast and refuses to do so. As a result, he is handed over to the executioner Kosorotov. Despite facing intense torture, Anton remains unyielding and refuses to give in. In a similar vein, Ivan Mikhailovich Subbotin, another member of the underground resistance, also endures torture without succumbing to betrayal. Unfortunately, the situation takes a turn for the worse as Lakhnovsky manages to successfully manipulate Pyotr Polipov, a bright and promising young man who is currently enrolled in the prestigious gymnasium, into betraying his own comrades.

==== Episode 2: A Night Before Dawn ====
It is 1914. After a few years, the village is still divided between poor peasants living in small huts and wealthy villagers in large homes. Some work tirelessly and struggle to make ends meet, while others enjoy a comfortable lifestyle. Mikhail Lukich Kaftanov, in particular, lives a life of indulgence and is not restrained by any limits. Despite this, rumors circulate that Zara, a gypsy, is pregnant with Kaftanov's child, causing distress to his elderly and ailing wife. However, Zara is actually in love with Polycarp and currently resides with his mother. Meanwhile, Anna, Kaftanov's daughter, and Ivan Savelyev, a stable boy, are in love with each other, although Anna is aware that their relationship has no future.

Ivan Savelyev, working as a stable boy under the employment of Kaftanov, finds himself deeply infatuated with none other than Anna, the daughter of his employer. On the other hand, Fyodor, the brother of Polycarp Kruzhilin, develops a strong desire to be associated with the affluent individual, Kaftanov, and he too becomes enamored with Anna. Meanwhile, as the narrative unfolds, Polycarp makes a triumphant return from the front lines.

In the city, Anton Savelyev, who has successfully managed to flee from the clutches of penal servitude (called in Russian katorga), marries a woman named Liza. This momentous occasion is graced by the presence of another individual named Polipov, who finds himself entangled in the intricate web of love for Liza. Polypov provides Anton with the location details of a secure hideout, intending to set him up for an arrest. However, against all odds, Anton manages to successfully evade capture and makes a daring escape. Once more, Agent Lakhnovsky endeavors to persuade Polypov to betray Anton, resulting in the latter's subsequent arrest.

As Silantiy Savelyev and his son Fyodor toil away on Kaftanov's zaimka (a particular kind of rural estate in Siberia), Fyodor cannot help but feel a sense of longing and admiration for the exciting and lively existence that Kaftanov leads in that very place. In the midst of a heated exchange between a son and his father, an unexpected visitor by the name of Anton, notorious for repeatedly fleeing from prison, suddenly appears at the zaimka.

==== Episode 3: What Do You Believe In? ====
Anton Savelyev escapes from prison and heads to his father's house, evading capture by Kaftanov and the gendarmes. He flees with Fyodor's help after the gendarmes arrive, leaving behind evidence of his presence. Demyan Inyutin tracks Fyodor in search of Anton, suspecting he may be aiding his wounded brother in the mountains.

As Fyodor diligently makes his way towards his brother, bearing a load of sustenance, little does he know that he is being meticulously pursued by Demyan and his formidable soldiers. Relentlessly, they trail Fyodor until they finally close in on him, and it is at this moment that Demyan, with a menacing glint in his eyes, brazenly brandishes the threat of taking Fyodor's life. Overwhelmed by a sudden surge of selflessness and compassion, Anton willingly exposes himself to the danger that looms and surrenders.

Inyutin orchestrates a plan to unite his son, Kiryan, with Anna, the daughter of Kaftanov. He manipulates the situation by pressuring Fyodor to disgrace Anfisa, whose daughter Kiryan loves. Anfisa falls in love with Fyodor and reveals she is pregnant. When Kiryan learns of the affair, he tells Ivan and they seek revenge on Fyodor. However, Fyodor overpowers them. Fyodor and Anna, who have secret feelings for each other, finally confess their love. Anna initially hesitates due to rumors about Fyodor and Anfisa, but Fyodor's earnest pleas eventually win her over. Anna reciprocates Fyodor's love in the end.

Kaftanov visits Polycarp Kruzhilin's house and initiates a conversation about politics and the future of Russia. "What do you want? And what do you believe in?" – Kaftanov asks. Polycarp replies: "I believe in people whom you consider to be dirt". According to Kaftanov, who is known as the "enemy of labor", the entire planet will be drenched in blood. In response to this grim statement, Kruzhilin, speaking on behalf of the hardworking people, firmly asserts that they are willing to sacrifice their own blood without hesitation.

Kaftanov arrives in the village with news of the Tsar's abdication, becoming the bearer of a revolution in Russia that he believes will not reach their remote location in the wilderness for some time. He plans to take action and prepare for potential issues to restore stability. Kaftanov learns of Anna and Fyodor's relationship from Demyan and decides to confront them one cold winter evening. Despite Anna's determination to marry Fyodor, Kaftanov initially blesses them before violently attacking Fyodor with a whip. He then commands his servant to set dogs on Fyodor, leading to a brutal attack. Just when all seems lost, Polycarp intervenes, ordering the dogs to retreat. He quickly shoots and kills one of the dogs, saving Fyodor from further harm. Kaftanov's unexpected outburst of violence is overshadowed by Polycarp's bravery and quick thinking in the face of danger.

==== Episode 4: Mutiny ====
In 1918, a counter-revolutionary uprising occurs in Siberia, with the Czechoslovak Corps and old regime forces joining in. The Bolsheviks are pushed underground and the Whites take control. Anton and Liza, along with their son, are arrested, but Polipov offers to take Anton's place in jail in exchange for Liza and the child's release. In another village, volunteer kulaks gather to capture the commissar Polycarp Kruzhilin.

Kaftanov has gathered a powerful group of bandits to carry out ruthless attacks on unsuspecting villages near Shantarsk, including killing village leaders and their families. Anfisa, who escaped from a neighboring village, recounts Kaftanov's violent actions. Now, Kaftanov sets his sights on Pankrat Nazarov, the village council chairman, and Polycarp Kruzhilin, the executive committee chairman, planning to harm them and their families. Anna hides Pankrat's family in her house, while Anfisa convinces Kiryan to shelter Kruzhilin and Aleynikov. Kiryan helps them hide, and when Kaftanov arrives, Kiryan creates a diversion to protect the fugitives. Despite Kaftanov's brutal methods, Fedor refuses to talk, leading to Ivan's punishment in a display of Kaftanov's unwavering determination to achieve his sinister goals.

Anton travels to Novo-Nikolaevsk from Tomsk as an uprising looms. Lisa and her son plan to meet him but the city is controlled by White Guard rebels who are capturing Bolsheviks. Polipov warns Liza to stay home, but she defiantly goes to the station to reunite with Anton. Despite the chaos, she and her son brave the streets. When they meet at the station, their reunion is interrupted by Lakhnovsky, who has sided with the rebels. He arrests Anton, Lisa, and their son, ending their happy moment.

Pyotr Polipov makes his way to Lakhnovsky's residence, where he is warmly greeted by Lakhnovsky and introduced to his wife and daughter, named Polina. Polipov reminds Lakhnovsky of the promise he made to refrain from harming Liza Savelyeva and her young son. In response, Lakhnovsky explains that it has become difficult to obtain the crucial testimony from Anton, and thus, he feels compelled to apply pressure by involving his own family. Lakhnovsky then proposes a plan to Polipov, suggesting that they use Anton's vulnerability to extract the necessary information. With Polipov silently agreeing to the proposal, Lakhnovsky orders for him to be apprehended, subjected to physical abuse, and ultimately placed in Anton's confinement.

During the interrogation, Lakhnovsky demands that Anton disclose where the leaders of the Tomsk Bolshevik underground may be hiding. Despite the threat of torture to his wife and son, Anton continues to refuse to answer any questions. Even Peter Polipov, who was secretly placed in Anton's cell as an informant by Lakhnovsky, is unable to get any information from Anton. As Anton's wife and son are being tortured in front of him, Polipov, who has strong feelings for Lisa, tries to speak up but Anton tells him to stay silent.

Lakhnovsky gives the order for Anton to be executed by a firing squad, but his plans are foiled when one of Anton's escorts is persuaded by a bribe from the Bolsheviks. This person helps Anton escape and go back to the city of Tomsk with the support of his allies. At the same time, Subbotin, unexpectedly showing compassion, promises to take care of Anton's wife, who has developed a mental illness while in prison, and their young son.

Kruzhilin and Nazarov, leading a partisan detachment, are pursued by White Guard punishers. Fyodor, Anna, Kiryan, and Anfisa, with Silanty Savelyev's help, form a close-knit group planning to seek refuge in a hidden canyon. The canyon is well fortified, requiring only a few guards at the entrance. Trapped inside by the White Guards at the sole exit, Colonel Zubov orders the execution of Pankrat Nazarov. Kaftanov tasks Ivan Savelyev with carrying out the execution. Colonel Zubov, now caring for Petya, invites to vacation while Silanty and Ustinya, who led the partisans to safety, are ordered to be hanged by Zubov.

==== Episode 5: Inside the Stone Bag ====
The White Guard colonel Zubov is unhappy that the Reds were not captured and executed. The Reds are now hiding in the mountains, but Kaftanov explains that they have nowhere to go as they are trapped. They will either starve or be surrounded and captured. Ivan is ordered to kill old Nazarov, but he cannot bring himself to do it and instead releases him. Ivan then pleads with the colonel to spare his parents, who have been sentenced to hang for helping the partisans, but the colonel refuses. Meanwhile, the Red partisans in the mountains have little chance of survival – they will have to fight their way out.

Pankrat calls Ivan to go with him to the partisans. At the same time Ivan, who fears that his brother Fyodor will kill him because he joined the gang in the hope that Kaftanov will give him his daughter Anna as a wife, refuses. Before Pankrat leaves, Ivan asks him if Anna and Fyodor are living as husband and wife. Pankrat replies that they do not, but that there is love between Anna and Fyodor.

By order of Zubov, Savelyev's father and mother are to be hanged because Silanty helped the partisans to escape. Ivan begs Colonel Zubov to pardon his parents, but the colonel is adamant: the execution must take place immediately. Demyan Inyutin lures Ivan into a barn, stuns him and locks him in. At the last moment Zubov orders his mother to be pardoned, but the order to execute his father remains in force. The execution is observed by Yakov Aleynikov, whom the partisans had brought down on reins at night from a steep hill for reconnaissance. Ivan, who escaped from the barn, arrives in Mikhailovka when the execution has already taken place. Aleynikov returns to the detachment by the same way that he got out, tells about Silanty's execution, and also about the fact that by the same way it is possible to bring down enough fighters to break the guards at the entrance to the gorge and attack Kaftanov's camp, where Colonel Zubov with a small guard and Kaftanov himself are. Then you can attack Zubov's regiment, which is stationed in Mikhailovka. Fyodor, having learned about his father's execution, dreams of getting to Vanka and taking revenge on him.

Partisans rappel down a gorge, kill guards, and attack a white detachment in Zaimka. Pankrat Nazarov is freed by Ivan. In a battle at Kaftanov's camp, Aleynikov and Colonel Zubov are killed by Colonel Zubov's checkers. Fyodor kills Zubov's son Petya, but Ivan covers him. Kaftanov, Ivan, and Colonel Zubov's son escape and hide. Kaftanov captures Anna, who broke into the house and is taken away. Kaftanov offers Ivan to take Anna as his wife, but Ivan refuses. Kaftanov orders Kosorotov to dishonor his daughter for her association with the partisans. Ivan kills Demyan Inyutin and Kaftanov, and brings Anna to the partisans.

==== Episode 6: Homecoming ====
It is 1925. After the Soviet power was fully established, life in rural areas is gradually improving, but there are still many issues, with hunger being the main problem. The communes did not have the desired outcome, so the authorities suggest that the peasants form collective farms (called in Russian kolkhoz). Ivan, who has served his sentence for being in Kaftanov's gang, is released. After leaving the camp, Ivan meets Agatha. Their chance meeting is destined to grow into love and family.

Anfisa marries Kiryan, but she still loves her former lover Fyodor. However, Fyodor is already married to Anna, who is the daughter of the murdered Kaftanov. Taking advantage of the situation, Lakhnovsky's gang sets fire to the houses of the Red Communards at night, and those who escape the flames are ordered to be shot. The Savelyevs' house burns down, but Ivan and his wife Agatha, who has returned after several years, rebuild it. However, Fyodor refuses to let his brother live in their parents' house.

Anfisa remains Fyodor's mistress. Kiryan finds out about this, which causes him considerable suffering.

Gangs roam the forests, one of which is led by Lakhnovsky. He is joined by Colonel Zubov's son Pyotr, Kaftanov's son Makar and former prison guard and Kaftanov's accomplice Kosorotov. They burn villages, trying to kill the communards. Just that evening, when a collective farm meeting is held in Mikhailovka, the gang attacks the village, burns houses and kills people. Yakov Aleynikov, a former Red partisan who is now an OGPU (later NKVD) officer, promises Kruzhilin to catch Lakhnovsky after the bandits retreat.

Ivan and his wife Agata return to Mikhailovka just after the pogrom organized by Lakhnovsky's gang. He is met with hateful glances from his fellow villagers. Nevertheless, Pankrat Nazarov meets Ivan kindly and allows him to stay in the village in his father's dilapidated house.

Kruzhilin notices that something wrong is going on with Fyodor Savelyev, who now works as postmaster in Shantarsk: he has ruined the work of the post office, and together with other volunteers did not go to destroy Lakhnovsky's gang. Polycarp openly tells Fyodor that he knows about his connection with Kiryan Inotin's wife and demands to stop this connection. Fyodor responds by asking to be relieved of his post as postmaster: he has decided to return to Mikhailovka. Fyodor takes Kiryan and Anfisa to Mikhailovka with him.

Having returned to Mikhailovka, Fyodor, appointed head of the local branch of Zagotskot, kicks Ivan and his wife out of his father's house and occupies it with his family. Pankrat Nazarov tries to reason with Fyodor, but he stands his ground. In addition, he declares to Anna that he knows that she married him not as a virgin, and he is sure that their first son is not from him, but from Ivan. Anna tries to convince Fyodor that this is not true, but she cannot confess who scolded her honor. Gossip spreads through the village about Fyodor's love affair with Anfisa. Kiryan, seeing and hearing all this, is gradually becoming an alcoholic.

Ivan is forced to live in a dugout with Agatha and her child. Fyodor comes to them and demands that Ivan and his family leave Mikhailovka, then he picks a fight with Ivan and tears his shabby clothes. Agatha defends her husband, pounces on Fyodor, tears off his jacket and carries him away. Fyodor warns Ivan never to meet either his son Syomka or Anna. Ivan tells Fyodor in his eyes that he, too, knows about his relationship with Anfisa. In response, as head of the Zagotskot branch in Mikhailovka, Fyodor dismisses Ivan from his position as a shepherd. Agata suggests Ivan to fulfill Fyodor's demand and leave the village, but Ivan does not want to leave his native village.

The year is 1933. Ivan asks Pankrat, the kolkhoz chairman, to accept his family into the kolkhoz. Pankrat hesitates due to warnings from Yakov Aleynikov, who doubts Ivan's loyalty. Pankrat promises Ivan admission after winter. Meanwhile, Yakov captures Lakhnovsky and Colonel Zubov's son Pyotr and sends them to Novosibirsk – formerly Novonikolayevsk. He informs Polycarp Kruzhilin that Lakhnovsky's assistant Kosorotov is still at large. Yakov sets out to find him.

Kaftanov's son Makar, together with his assistant, is going to "rob" the store in an armed robbery. Makar takes a revolver from Kosorotov. Kosorotov now lives under a different lastname – Ogorodnikov, and also adopted a girl Masha. Ivan in Mikhailovka meets for the first time with Fyodor's son Syomka and his girlfriend Vera Inyutina, the daughter of Kiryan and Anfisa.

After the end of winter, a collective farm meeting is held to discuss the admission of Ivan and his family to the collective farm. Kaftanov's former mistress Lushka Kashkarova recalls how Ivan once took away her moonshine for Kaftanov and swung a whip at her. Nevertheless, the collective farm meeting does not consider this significant and accepts Ivan into the collective farm. Fyodor, who is also present at the meeting, observes the voting results with obvious displeasure.

==== Episode 7: On The Native Land ====
Petr Petrovich Popov is now the leader of the party committee in the region. He seeks help from Anton Savelyev and Polycarp Kruzhilin to gather food for the hungry in the Volga region. Kruzhilin explains that the village is facing a famine due to a lack of potatoes. Polipov decides to distribute half of the remaining potatoes to provide temporary relief.

Polina Arnoldovna Lakhnovskaya tells Polipov that her father miraculously escaped being shot and remembers all the kindness he received from Polipov. She confesses her love for Polipov and hopes for a future together, causing fear in Polipov upon learning Lakhnovsky is still alive.

Yakov Aleynikov confronts Pankrat Nazarov in Mikhailovka over Ivan joining the collective farm, despite Yakov's warning against it. Pankrat justifies his decision, needing more workers and seeing Ivan as valuable. Fyodor watches attentively. Yakov reports Ivan joining to the District Committee and Kruzhilin. Kruzhilin claims permission was given, but Yakov sees Ivan as an enemy. Kruzhilin warns Yakov's actions against socialist legality, but Yakov leaves the committee without heeding.

During the White Guard uprising, Polina, believed to be Lakhnovsky's daughter, is seen at his house by Polipov. She later reveals to Polipov that her father is alive, upsetting him as he thought Lakhnovsky was dead, keeping his informant role secret. Polipov fears the truth coming out and exposing his actions. Polina confesses her love to Polipov and they end up in bed together. She declares her commitment to a lifetime of love and marriage to Pyotr, easing Polipov's worries about his political career being harmed by their marriage. She reassures him by revealing she has been married before and uses a different last name.

Mikhailovka receives a new movie and newsreel, prompting Pankrat to instruct the farm accountant to cover the expenses for a movie show for the hardworking farmers. The collective farmers excitedly gather at the local club to watch the film, where they are amazed to see Anton Savelyev, one of their own, highlighted as a successful leader in a tractor factory. The villagers, especially Fyodor and Ivan, feel proud and inspired by Anton's achievements. The news spreads, fostering ambition and unity among the farmers. The movie leaves a lasting impression on the villagers, emphasizing the importance of hard work and dedication in achieving success and making a positive impact on their lives and community.

One day, Ivan and Anna coincidentally meet by the calm river. Ivan tends to the farm horses, bringing them to drink. Syomka, Fyodor and Anna's child, helps Ivan, showing affection for animals. Ivan chats with Anna, curious about her well-being. Anna hesitantly admits she lives comfortably, but her expression reveals the harsh truth – her living situation is lacking.

Fyodor receives a letter from his brother, Anton, asking him to get along with Ivan. Fyodor gets into an argument with Anna, who insults him by saying Ivan is more important. Hurt, Fyodor decides to ruin Ivan's life by having Kiryan steal horses and blame Ivan. Fyodor makes Kiryan promise to help in exchange for leaving Anfisa alone. Kiryan reluctantly agrees, hoping Fyodor keeps his word.

Aleynikov arrives at a large farm where the collective farmers are working diligently. He shocks everyone by publicly arresting Ivan based on an accusation made by Kiryan Inyutin, claiming Ivan stole the farm's horses. Amidst the chaos, Arkashka Molchun steps forward and bravely declares that Kiryan is the true thief who sold the horses to the gypsies. However, Aleynikov, suspicious and distrusting, believes Molchun is helping Ivan escape punishment. Due to his misguided beliefs, Aleynikov decides to arrest both Ivan and Arkashka Molchun and leads them away from the confused crowd.

Nazarov informs Kruzhilin about Ivan's arrest, leading to a meeting with Aleynikov at the District Committee. The committee members try to explain that Aleynikov's actions go against socialist legality, but he insists they are too passive. Kruzhilin orders Ivan and Molchun's release, but Aleynikov refuses and leaves abruptly from the District Committee.

Fyodor, accompanied by Inyutin after their trip to Shantarsk, seems reluctant to utter a word, while the slightly intoxicated Kiryan boldly declares that nobody has succeeded in finding evidence against him. Furthermore, Kiryan reveals that Ivan, who finds himself entangled in legal matters, has been transported to Novosibirsk to face a trial.

Ivan and Arkady Molchun were handed down lengthy prison sentences, which came as a devastating blow. In an attempt to console Agatha, Pankrat Nazarov offered words of reassurance, expressing his disbelief in Ivan's guilt. However, he also emphasized the importance of Agatha's ability to move forward and not harbor any anger towards others. Pankrat stressed the necessity for Agatha to remain connected with people, refusing to isolate herself from society.

Syomka Savelyev informs the villagers that they believe Fyodor was responsible for Ivan's imprisonment. Fyodor then decides to leave for Shantarsk to work at the MTS, taking Kiryan with him. Kiryan reveals it was Fyodor who ordered Ivan's imprisonment and demands Fyodor leave Anfisa behind. Fyodor realizes he needs Anfisa's safety, not Kiryan's, and agrees to leave with Kiryan and Anfisa for Mikhailovka.

During an inspection visit to Aleynikov's NKVD office, the district committee's bureau members requested to see the ongoing cases. Aleynikov refused to provide any files. Kruzhilin, informed about this, promised to report Aleynikov's behavior to the regional party committee and NKVD department. Kruzhilin was later interrogated about the Savelyev family, and during the interrogation, accused Aleynikov of arranging the humiliating questioning, leading Aleynikov to question his actions.

Kruzhilin seeks answers from Subbotin about mistreatment by the NKVD. Subbotin is baffled by the unfairness in their kolhoz. Kruzhilin reunites with Pankrat at the stone ford, discussing Ivan's innocence and Fyodor's betrayal. They are perplexed by Fyodor's actions towards his brother. Pankrat suggests promoting Agata or relocating her, but Kruzhilin is unsure about taking any action at the moment.

Fyodor, accompanied by his entire family, embarks on a journey to Shantarsk. As he prepares to depart from the comfort of his home, Pankrat, a close friend welcoming him at the gate, expresses his genuine relief that Fyodor is finally leaving behind the mundane surroundings of Mikhailovka.

==== Episode 8: Ordeal ====
Fyodor is determined to have his brother Ivan apprehended as he seeks to exact revenge for Ivan's inability to prevent their father, Silantiy Savelyev, from being executed. However, in a cruel twist of events, Ivan finds himself wrongfully blamed by Fyodor, who cunningly receives assistance from Kiryan. Interestingly, Kiryan harbors a deep desire where he envisions a future where his beloved wife, Anfisa, is no longer entangled in any way with Fyodor. It is worth noting that this desire becomes the ultimate compensation for Kiryan's involvement in the deceitful plot.

Agatha is struggling to uncover the truth about her past, and she seeks help from Polipov. However, she discovers that Polipov cannot influence the decisions of those in power, leaving her feeling frustrated and helpless. Agatha also confides in Polipov about his own fears of being exposed, and he decides to remove Koshkin and Baulin, who question his biography's truthfulness. This complicates Agatha's search for the truth, as she navigates the web of deception surrounding Polipov. She faces the complicated relationships of those involved in her search for answers, and time is running out. As a threatening situation approaches Kruzhilin, Subbotin moves him to a safe place, while Agatha and her child seek help from Anton Savelyev.

Agatha travels to Kharkov to inform Anton about Ivan's tragic fate. Anton reaches out to Subbotin for help, but Subbotin cannot provide any answers. Despite this, Anton and Lisa invite Agatha to live with them, but she declines and decides to go back home. She spends her days on the road hoping to find Ivan. Ivan is still not present, which makes Agatha even more upset and yearning for him. However, Subbotin, who is also the secretary of the regional committee, decides to safeguard his old friend Kruzhilin from possible persecution. To guarantee Kruzhilin's safety, Subbotin organizes his relocation to Oirotia, located in the beautiful Gorny Altai.

It seems that Syomka Savelyev and Verka Inyutina have developed a romantic connection.

Instead of Kruzhilin, Polipov takes over the position of secretary of the district committee. With a firm grip, he intensifies control and shows no mercy in his efforts to eradicate any mismanagement within the collective farms, going as far as depleting even the essential seed funds.

Mass purges are organized in the party, including among the communists of the Shantarsky district. To consolidate his position Polipov is trying to take advantage of this. This is well understood by the members of the bureau of the district committee, but they cannot resist Polipov: he uses the NKVD bodies and Yakov Aleynikov in his interests.

Aleynikov, confident in his position as an honest Communist, arrests Khlebnikov on Polipov's tip-off. Being frightened by Baulin's question, who asked Koshkin how Polipov managed to free himself from death row (which Polipov keeps mentioning), Pyotr Petrovich threatens to deprive Baulin and Koshkin of Party membership for their allegedly poor management of the district's economic organizations, which inevitably may also lead to their arrest with more tragic consequences for them. Aleynikov tells Polipov about Lakhnovsky's assistant Kosorotov, who is still hiding unknown.

In Shantarsk, subbotniks are organized to build different facilities; most of the locals hang out there. Anfisa and Fyodor continue to develop their love. Kiryan becomes increasingly depressed. Aleynikov arrests Kosorotov, who lives under the lastname of Ogorodnikov. This arrest is seen by Mania Ogorodnikova and Vera Inyutina, adopted by Kosorotov. Teachers and schoolchildren turn away from Mania Ogorodnikova as the daughter of the arrested "enemy of the people". And only the school principal congratulates Mania on this event at the presentation of her matriculation certificate. Vera Inyutina does not seem to leave Mania with her attention, although she did not even sit next to her at the celebration.

According to the results of the inspection of the organizations headed by Koshkin and Baulin, Polipov satisfies the Bureau of the District Committee. Baulin and Koshkin convincingly prove that Polipov is actually ruining collective farms and the district as a whole. Polipov directly speaks about the necessity to expel Baulin and Koshkin from the Party, but the members of the Bureau of the District Committee rebel against Polipov's position. The position of the bureau of the District Committee is supported by Aleynikov. At the same time, Polipov continues to bend his line and asks Aleynikov to "take a closer look" at Baulin and Koshkin.

Aleynikov's wife urges him to leave his job at the NKVD, suspecting his arrest of enemies is manipulated by Polipov. News of a fire in Mikhailovka arrives, involving a combine harvester and injured Syomka Savelyev. An informant blames Fyodor Savelyev for the fire, but Syomka claims it was lightning. Despite Anikey's sabotage theory, evidence points to natural causes. Fyodor offers to be arrested, but Aleynikov decides against it and moves on.

Vera Inyutina continues her relationship with Semyon, but apparently has no serious intentions towards him. Semyon, meanwhile, is seriously attracted to Vera.

Aleynikov gets a call from an investigator of the NKVD who is interested in Baulin and Koshkin, as their activities are seen as anti-Soviet. Aleynikov defends them, saying they are loyal to socialism. Polipov convinces Aleynikov to talk to Baulin and Koshkin in his office. During the conversation, Baulin and Koshkin argue that Aleynikov is illegally arresting people and Polipov is causing problems in the district. They suggest that Aleynikov is being manipulated by Polipov. Aleynikov responds by emphasizing his dedication to the revolution and the security of the socialist state. After the conversation, Aleynikov's wife leaves him because she cannot understand his cruelty.

After arriving in Novosibirsk, Polipov talks to Subbotin, the regional committee's secretary. Polipov proudly tells Subbotin that he has exceeded the targets set by the State Supply Program. However, Subbotin tactfully redirects Polipov's attention to an important resolution passed by the Central Committee of the All-Union Communist Party of Bolsheviks (b). This resolution emphasizes the need to stop unjustified repressions against party members, which Polipov has been doing. Subbotin discusses the urgency of restoring discipline within the party organizations. When Polipov sarcastically suggests that Subbotin is at risk of burning out from his job, Subbotin reveals that the regional committee has decided to evaluate all party organizations in the region. Interestingly, they will start with the Shantarsky district, where Polipov is the first secretary.

==== Episode 9: The War Is Coming ====
Subbotin contacts Polycarp Kruzhilin, who is currently in Oirotia, and invites him to his office for a discussion. During their conversation, Subbotin suggests that Polycarp should return to Shantarsk. However, it has been a few years since Polipov took over the district, and the situation there is not ideal. In the neighboring town of Mikhailovka, life goes on with people getting married, having children, and dying. The world also looks bleak as fascism approaches the USSR's borders. Unfortunately, Fedor has not kept his promise to leave Kiryan's wife, Anfisa, and their forbidden relationship has resumed.

Agatha waits for Ivan's return on the road. When Kruzhilin became party secretary, his first official trip took him to Mikhailovka, where he met Volodya, Agatha and Ivan's son. During this trip, Kruzhilin also encountered Pankrat Nazarov, who revealed the worsening conditions in the collective farms of the Shantarsky district. The previous leader, Polipov, had caused ruin to all the farms in the district, but the district's reporting painted a positive image. It was clear that the kolkhozes were being plundered, leaving the farms without resources and fair payments for the farmers. In the face of these problems, Kruzhilin started considering potential solutions.

On Sunday, June 22, 1941, Anna and Fyodor's children plan to go fishing. During a conversation, Semyon expresses to his father that he believes he is only assisting others for a small amount of money and demands a higher payment of a ruble or more. Fyodor continues to have an affair with Anfisa despite being married, and before going to the MTS with Kiryan, he plans another meeting with Anfisa. Vera Inyutina is employed as a secretary-machinist in the district committee.

Aleynikov goes to the District Committee to meet with Kruzhilin, but Polycarp is unable to connect him with any of the secretaries. Kruzhilin tells Aleynikov that he is busy preparing a speech for a party meeting and cannot talk right now. Yakov tells Polycarp that Ivan Savelyev has been released from prison and will be coming home soon. This news makes Aleynikov question his actions towards Ivan and the others who were arrested. Polycarp avoids discussing this with Yakov. When Aleynikov asks about Polycarp's work dynamic with Polipov, Polycarp avoids giving a direct answer. Yakov suggests that Polycarp get help from a typist to make his work easier. Kruzhilin recommends talking to Vera Inyutina for advice on this.

Agatha excitedly waits for Ivan on the road and is overjoyed to see him during a thunderstorm. A rainbow appears after the rain, creating a beautiful backdrop for their reunion. They reminisce about the past, with Ivan recalling the songs of larks and Agatha sharing stories about their children. When Ivan finally meets their kids, they don't recognize him due to his imprisonment as an 'enemy of the people.' Volodya's innocent question about his status leaves Ivan speechless, struggling to explain his past actions. The weight of his son's confusion weighs heavily on Ivan as he presents gifts and tries to reconnect with his family in the midst of their unfamiliarity with him.

Upon his return to Mikhailovka, Ivan Savelyev was greeted with anticipation. It was uncertain who would be eagerly awaiting his arrival, besides his devoted wife Agatha. The years of his absence had allowed their daughter Daria to blossom into a young woman, a fact that Ivan was completely unaware of due to his incarceration. As Ivan settled back into his hometown, the global landscape was undergoing a drastic shift. The ominous rise of fascism was spreading its tendrils across the world, and the Second World War had already ignited. Remarkably, amidst this turmoil, the Soviet Union and Germany had entered into a surprising non-aggression pact, causing further uncertainty and speculation about the future.

Pankrat Nazarov warmly welcomes Ivan back, congratulating him and engaging in casual conversation before discreetly dismissing Agata. He delves into a more intimate conversation with Ivan, discussing perspectives on life, treating others with strength and forgiveness, and refraining from sin. Ivan shares his experiences in the camps, forming connections with Kosorotov and Makar Kaftanov. Pankrat mentions Aleynikov's involvement in such cases, believing he is well-informed, but Ivan proves even Aleynikov can struggle. Ivan holds no grudges towards Aleynikov despite challenges faced, showing a depth of understanding and forgiveness in their interactions.

Subbotin, a resident of Novosibirsk, contacts Kruzhilin via his landline phone. Polycarp, inquisitive about the attendees of the upcoming party meeting in Shantarsk, attempts to extract this information from Subbotin. However, Subbotin urgently instructs Polycarp to assemble the bureau members as there is a significant government message scheduled for 4 o'clock in the afternoon. Following the conversation with Subbotin, the telephonist excitedly informs Kruzhilin that the war has commenced, and this news has circulated among all the telephonists in Moscow since the morning.

Syomka Savelyev and Verka Inyutina are currently enjoying a blissful vacation along the tranquil river, completely oblivious to the harsh reality that war has already ravaged their beloved country. Amidst this peaceful backdrop, Semka finds himself grappling with a whirlwind of emotions, unsure if his love for Vera truly runs deep or if their impending wedding is actually necessary. The doubts that plague his mind lead him to ponder the possibility of postponing their sacred union, as he searches for clarity and assurance in the midst of uncertainty.

The Shantarsk District Committee and the whole country are eagerly awaiting an announcement from the Soviet government about Germany's attack on the Soviet Union. In this tense atmosphere, Agatha rushes to inform Pankrat and Ivan urgently about the outbreak of war. Ivan is devastated as he realizes he will likely be separated from his wife and children again. After the announcement, Polycarp takes charge and holds the first war meeting of the district committee. Meanwhile, Syomka and Vera return from the river unaware of the news, but Kolka Inyutin tells them that the war with Germany has started. The seriousness of the situation becomes clear as men gather at the military enlistment office, ready to join the fight against the German invaders. Semyon is among these brave individuals, prepared to defend his homeland.

Meanwhile, Anikey Yelizarov asks Aleynikov to give him a recommendation to join the militia.

Fyodor inquires of Anna whether Ivan has truly made his way back, and in an attempt to create an excuse for himself, claiming he desires a smoke, he endeavors to leave in order to meet with Anfisa. Without any hesitation, Anna explicitly expresses her wish for Fyodor to be enlisted in the war and meet his demise there. Despite Anna's cruel remark, Fyodor proceeds to embark on a romantic outing with Anfisa.

Anfisa sneaks into bed after her date with Fyodor, but is confronted by Kiryan at home. Kiryan is no longer angry and asks why Anfisa loves Fyodor so much, comparing her loyalty to that of a dog. Anfisa ironically suggests that Kiryan is capable of a more human-like love, and he calmly agrees, confessing that he helped Fyodor imprison Ivan and deliver the kolkhoz horses to the gypsies. He now regrets his actions and worries about the consequences for Ivan. Kiryan has decided to go to war and expects to die there. Even if he survives, he says he will not return to Anfisa after the war.

The conflict is getting more intense and is spreading throughout the entire frontline as the nation fights for its survival against the external enemy.

==== Episode 10: Troubling Days And Nights ====
During the Great Patriotic War, a growing number of evacuated individuals are being transported to Siberia, making it difficult to provide suitable employment and accommodation. The placement of professors, city pensioners, lawyers, and artists is a significant challenge. Subbotin informs Kruzhilin that an agricultural machine-building plant has been relocated to Shantarsk. Anton Savelyev, the eldest brother, is appointed as the director of the plant, which undergoes a significant transformation. Under his leadership, the plant shifts its focus to producing shells for the front lines of the conflict. Despite the challenges faced, numerous obstacles remain to be overcome. Anton Savelyev's determination and dedication to the plant's restoration make him a valuable asset in the ongoing conflict.

The order to start up the plant came unexpectedly, with the location being practically empty. In charge of overseeing these operations is Ivan Ivanovich Khokhlov, the chief engineer of the plant. Meanwhile, Yakov Aleynikov finds himself deeply infatuated with Vera and decides to visit Inyutinov in hopes of playing matchmaker. However, just as things seem to be taking a romantic turn, a directive is issued to repurpose the entire enterprise to serve the needs of the front. Soon after, a group of specialists are brought in, including Anton Saveliyev, who has been appointed as the new director of the plant. During a conversation with Saveliyev, he reveals that he had been held captive alongside Peter Zubov, the son of a murdered colonel. Shockingly, Saveliyev spots Zubov at the station, prompting Aleynikov to vow to capture the traitor and bring him to justice.

==== Episode 11: Before The Assault ====
Despite the fact that Ivan Savelyev enjoys a comfortable life alongside his daughter and Agata, he faces challenges when it comes to living harmoniously with his fellow villagers. Preferring solitude, Ivan chooses to work as a shepherd on the collective farm, where he can embrace his solitude and find solace in the company of animals.

Anton Savelyev, despite being in Shantarsk for over a month, has not met his siblings. He last crossed paths with Ivan in 1910, helping him escape gendarmes. Anton invites Ivan, his brother, and their life partners to visit him. Fyodor, despite his unhappiness, attends the meeting. The brothers gather at a guest house, but the possibility of reconciliation seems unlikely. Fyodor has a deep-seated grudge against Ivan for the tragic death of his parents and the fact that Ivan later aligned with the Whites, even after his father's execution, intensifies his animosity. Kiryan, a young man, decides to join the military enlistment office to join the frontlines, despite his resentment towards Ivan. The situation in Shantarsk is tumultuous, and Kiryan's decision to join the frontlines is a testament to the complexities of life in the Soviet Union.

Kiryan Inyutin, struggling with family issues, seeks refuge in the front. District executive committee chairman Polypov criticizes the collective farm chairman, Pankrat Nazarov, for his capriciousness, choosing to sow fields with rye instead of wheat. Subbotin and Kruzhilin, determined to uncover the truth and restore order, embark on a daring expedition to the collective farm. Their ultimate goal is to ascertain the validity of the former chairman's claims, and they find that the former chairman is correct.

==== Episode 12: Human Destinies ====
Kiryan and Anfisa's daughter, Vera, is overjoyed to receive a proposal from Yakov Nikolaevich, who is also her husband. However, Vera's behavior changes when Yakov becomes cold towards her, evading conversations about their wedding. Consequently, Vera declares their wedding will no longer take place, influenced by her feelings for him and Yakov's personal struggles.

After resolving a case involving Zubov and Kaftanov's sons, Yakov prepares for his next mission. He encounters Fedor and Anna's son, who finds Masha buried under snow and near death. The boy, with remarkable courage and determination, skillfully rescues Masha from her icy predicament, ultimately saving her life. Yakov's actions demonstrate the dangers of adversity and the importance of personal relationships in navigating life's challenges.

Aleynikov arrests Pyotr Zubov and Makar Kaftanov, ending his relationship with Vera due to realizing his past mistakes. Fyodor decides to leave Anna but is rejected by Anfisa, who remains loyal to her husband. The factory successfully produces its first batch of products with workers' efforts. Semyon and Ivan Savelyevs bravely join the front lines. Aleynikov advises Pyotr Zubov to make amends for his guilt by shedding blood for the Motherland. Despite challenges, there is hope for victory on the horizon.

=== Season 2 ===
The year is 1942. The town of Shantarsk witnesses the commencement of operations at the military plant, having been built completely from the ground up in an exposed outdoor setting. In a tragic incident where a fire broke out, the eldest sibling of the Savelyev family, Anton, heroically sacrificed his own life while attempting to rescue others. This deeply affects Fyodor, prompting him to think about his own life and undergo a significant change. Filled with clarity and self-awareness, Fyodor decides to bravely go to the frontlines, prepared to face the difficulties and sacrifices that await him. Fyodor's wife, Anna, and their younger sons decide to relocate to the collective farm owned by Pankrat Nazarov. Meanwhile, Fyodor's eldest son, Semyon, opted to pursue a career as a tanker and was fortunate enough to join the tank crew of Dedyukhin, where his uncle Ivan already serves.

The second and third episodes of this season delve into the gripping events that unfold at the frontlines, shedding light on the courageous combat operations undertaken by the valiant Dedyukhin's tank crew stationed in the Kursk salient. These episodes present a captivating narrative, not only showcasing the intense battles that transpire, but also allowing viewers to witness poignant moments of respite and the blossoming of love amidst the chaos and uncertainty of war.

The fourth and fifth episodes depict the events that unfolded during the final stage of the Great Patriotic War. The story unfolds in Mikhailovka and Shantarsk, with Siberian tankers Semyon and Ivan Savelyev achieving fame in the latter. In a battle near Kursk, their tank is hit, Semyon gets injured, and they aid artillerymen against enemy attack. Semyon is captured, leading Ivan to think he's dead. Residents of Shantarsk are excited by the news of the tankers' success, highlighting the intense and tragic events that transpire in both locations. Semyon finds himself trapped within the confines of Buchenwald, an infamous Nazi concentration camp known for its horrifying atrocities and inhuman treatment of prisoners. Peter Zubov, Maxim Nazarov, and Gubarev are also present, accompanying him.

The culmination of the conflict between the Savelyev siblings, namely Fyodor and Ivan, takes a deeply distressing turn as it reaches its conclusion: Ivan, in an act of desperation, fatally shoots Fyodor amidst the chaotic backdrop of the German rear when Fyodor menacingly brandishes a firearm towards him. Despite his desire to avoid returning to his homeland due to his new physical condition, Kiryan Inyutin is ultimately brought back by his devoted wife, Anfisa. Pyotr Polipov arrives in Shantarsk with the intention of securing a prominent position for himself. However, he keeps a secret hidden from everyone – his encounter with his former influential supporter, Lakhnovsky, who has now aligned himself with fascist ideologies.

The thrilling conclusion of the movie epic is brought to a close in the sixth and seventh episodes. After the prolonged conflict, the war has finally come to an end, and the prospects of a tranquil existence are gradually improving. The main characters' children have all pursued different careers as adults: Dmitry Savelyev is now a poet, Vasily Kruzhilin works as a newspaper editor, and Dasha Savelyeva, who is Ivan's daughter, has become a doctor. Peter Polipov, who has been concealing his past and causing damage to the local economy, is finally revealed and justice prevails.

Anna Savelyeva discovers that her son Semyon showed great bravery by joining the anti-fascist resistance in Norway after being captured. Sadly, he died while fighting. Anna decides to pay a visit to her son's grave.

==== Episode 1: Baptized by Fire ====
The year is 1942. As the battle of Moscow continues, news of the conflict attracts volunteers. Anton Savelyev's son, Yura, a skilled turner at a military factory, has been applying to the military enlistment office to contribute to his country's defense. Despite his determination, his application has been consistently denied. His mother visits Polycarp Matveyevich to request his help in securing a position at the library. Despite his determination, fate has consistently denied his application.

A fire occurs at a shell depot in Shantarsk. Despite the valiant efforts of the firemen, the flames prove to be insurmountable, subsequently propagating towards the nearby warehouses that house an ample supply of ammunition, meticulously arranged and ready to be dispatched to the battlefront. Tragically, it is during this chaotic ordeal that Anton Savelyev, the individual responsible for issuing the evacuation of the incendiary shells from the conflagrating warehouse, meets his untimely demise due to an unforeseen explosion.

Ivan and Semyon Savelyev together get to the front in a tank brigade. In the first battle, their crew hits 5 enemy tanks. Fyodor Savelyev, finally confused in life, goes to the front. The military unit, where he went, is defeated in battle. Fyodor surrenders as a prisoner of war.

==== Episode 2: Scorched Love ====
The year is 1943. The Red Army is making progress in penetrating enemy fortified lines, with the tank brigade moving from Kursk to Lukashevka. They are tasked with excavating trenches and constructing defensive structures. Tankers often visit nearby villages to form friendships and romantic relationships. Semyon Savelyev develops a fondness for Olga Korolyova, but her German occupation prevents him from fully pursuing his feelings. Olga understands his feelings but has a different story. She survived her mother's murder at the hands of the Nazis, enduring emotional and physical scars. Meanwhile, Kiryan, a soldier, is confined to a hospital bed, having both of her legs amputated. The Red Army's efforts to penetrate enemy fortified lines are hindered by the German occupation and the unique experiences of the tankers.

Yakov Aleynikov, a newcomer, meets Captain Valentik, who is accused of being an undercover German agent. Aleynikov becomes suspicious, but Valentik escapes. Kiryan Inyutin, a war veteran who lost both legs, attempts suicide while in a hospital bed. Fyodor, captured by the Germans, is coerced into serving as a policeman for Lieutenant Colonel Lakhnovsky, a former Tsarist security service investigator and now a member of the Abwehr. Lakhnovsky discovers that Peter Polipov, a former recruit and provocateur, is working for an army newspaper nearby. Lakhnovsky decides to locate Polipov to prevent further chaos.

==== Episode 3: Fire and Ashes ====
In the midst of the battle, the crew members who managed to survive emerge from the tank that had been targeted by German forces. However, their attempts to advance and escape the relentless barrage of enemy fire seem almost insurmountable. Amidst the chaos, Semyon Savelyev, who had sustained severe injuries, succumbs to the pain and slips into unconsciousness. Semyon awoke to find himself already held captive.

Arnold Lakhnovsky is employed as a law enforcement officer, holding the distinguished position of SS lieutenant colonel, in a charming town situated in western Ukraine. After successfully completing his current mission, he is given a new assignment by the German command, with the assurance that upon its fulfillment, he will be rewarded with the prestigious rank of colonel. There arises a requirement to locate a trustworthy individual of Russian descent who possesses a flawlessly pristine image in the eyes of the Soviet authorities, while also ensuring that they do not raise even the slightest hint of suspicion. The tasks that he will be performing are set to occur in remote areas within Russian territory, however, individuals who have voluntarily left their own country and joined his cause will not be considered as part of his team. Lakhnovsky undertakes the pursuit of locating his former instigator, Polipov.

Yakov Aleynikov, a military counterintelligence expert, meets his godson, Ivan Savelyev, who is also his godson. Yakov had previously incarcerated Ivan, who is concerned about his nephew, Semyon, missing in action. Aleynikov informs Ivan that Fyodor has taken on the role of a Nazi punisher. Ivan decides to join Aleynikov's detachment.

Polipov, accompanied by the editorial staff of a newspaper, is deceived into joining Polipov and guides him across the dangerous front line. A fateful encounter between Polipov and Lakhnovsky solidifies their connection. Lakhnovsky shares a detailed account of the sinister plans by the Western capitalist world to dismantle the Soviet Union and undermine its people's resilience. These schemes aim to obliterate the Soviet Union's foundations, leaving its citizens vulnerable and oppressed. Valentik safely escorts Polipov back behind the front lines, ensuring his safety.

Below is an excerpt from their dialogue:

- When the war is over, things will calm down... Then the real fight will begin! The ideological machinery of the rest of the world is entirely in our hands! And many of our compatriots will actively support us!

- I don't think you will find many active supporters...

- We will find... No, we will raise them! We make as many of these as we need! Money will do everything! We will undermine the monolith of your society! We will win the war for the souls of men!

==== Episode 4: Confrontation ====
In a fierce German attack, partisans launch an unexpected attack, forcing soldiers to seek refuge in a dense forest. Lieutenant Colonel Lakhnovsky, who has a leg injury, escapes with the help of Fyodor Savelyev. However, their escape is halted by an SS officer who fires upon Lakhnovsky. The partisans encircle the location, leaving no escape route. The Savelyev brothers, Ivan and Fyodor, are reunited after a long separation. Ivan, filled with resentment, reproaches Fyodor for his collaboration with the Germans, while Fyodor recalls Ivan's involvement in Kaftanov's service. Anna, married to Fedor but in love with Ivan, finds herself caught in the feud. Despite her efforts, the brothers seem to never reconcile their differences. Olga, pregnant with Semyon's child, confides in Ivan Silantievich, Semyon's uncle, about her situation. The story highlights the tension and challenges faced by soldiers during World War II.

Subbotin, the regional party committee secretary, receives news of his last (middle) son's death, leading to his own tragic passing during a speech. Before dying, he expresses distrust towards Polypov to Kruzhilin, warning against giving him responsibilities. Semyon is captured and ends up in the Buchenwald concentration camp with others under the harsh SS Unterscharführer Eisel's command. Meanwhile, Kiryan Inyutin, a legless war veteran, begs for money from train passengers instead of returning home. The narrative highlights themes of loss, betrayal, survival, and desperation in the midst of war and political upheaval. The characters navigate through various challenges, showcasing the complexities of human relationships and morality in times of turmoil.

==== Episode 5: Pain and Anger ====
Liza, who is the widow of Anton Savelyev, still maintains her job at the library and persists in seeking the truth from Polina regarding her deceased husband, Polipov. The woman firmly believes that Polipov acted as a provocateur, intentionally disclosing the locations where Anton could seek refuge in the initial years following the revolution. Polina reaches a point of immense frustration as she becomes weary of constantly enduring Lisa's reproaches and relentless demands for a letter of confession. In an act of defiance, Polina deliberately decides to address everything and everyone around her with utmost honesty, often adopting a blunt and impolite approach. Unfortunately, this unforeseen turn of events takes a tragic toll on the elderly Lisa, leading to an unfortunate heart attack that eventually results in her untimely demise.

Polycarp Matveyevich is filled with regret and sorrow upon hearing of Liza's death, blaming himself for helping her secure a job that led to her demise. Meanwhile, Kiryan, determined despite losing his legs, fights to reclaim his independence. Anfisa, Kiryan's wife, is shocked to learn he is alive but reduced to begging at train stations. She sets out on a heartfelt journey to find him, driven by love and their unbreakable bond. Anfisa faces despair and uncertainty but refuses to let fate tear them apart, growing stronger in her determination with each passing day.

Agata, the wife of Ivan Savelyev, tragically loses her life at the hands of bandits who are stealing hay from the collective farm. Ivan, having fought in the war and suffered the devastating loss of his right arm, returns home to find his beloved wife gone. Meanwhile, Polipov, another war veteran, also returns from the front and seeks the assistance of Polycarp Kruzhilin in reclaiming his former position in the district committee. However, Kruzhilin, who vividly remembers a conversation he had with Subbotin, strongly opposes this request. Despite Kruzhilin's objections, the regional committee decides to appoint Polipov as the secretary of the district committee, much to Kruzhilin's persistence in opposing this decision.

==== Episode 6: Conscience ====
The year is 1957. Polycarp Matveyevich Kruzhilin assumes the role of a Party leader within a collective farm, where the esteemed position of chairman is held by none other than Ivan Silantievich Savelyev, a courageous individual who has recently returned from serving on the frontlines. Vasily Kruzhilin, an editor of the district newspaper, finds himself increasingly drawn towards seeking guidance from the district secretary, Pyotr Petrovich Polipov, in his quest to comprehend the myriad challenges that accompany life after war. As he navigates through the complexities of this new era, Vasily begins to place greater trust and reliance on Pyotr's insights and perspectives, surpassing the influence and counsel he once sought from his own father and close friend, Ivan Savelyev.

Vasily's article in the newspaper deeply harms his father and tarnishes the reputation of the Red Partisan collective farm. The community is greatly affected, shaking their very existence. Meanwhile, Maxim returns to his hometown after serving time for treason, seeking forgiveness from his father. Despite his heartfelt plea, his father refuses to forgive him, leaving Maxim disheartened and burdened by his past. Unable to bear the weight of his torment and the lack of forgiveness, Maxim takes his own life. His father, unable to forgive the betrayal but still loving his son, dies on Maxim's grave. Peter Zubov arrives and shares about his divorce with Semyon after the concentration camp.

==== Episode 7: Immortality ====
The year is 1961. Olga Koroleva and her daughter visit Ivan Silantievich in Mikhailovka, where he suggests they visit Anna Mikhailovna, the mother of Semyon, who is still hopeful about her son's survival despite his reported death. Ivan encourages Olga to share the story of their encounters with Semyon, including their time as partisans led by Yakov Aleynikov. The letter from Norway reveals a Russian tank sergeant who bears a striking resemblance to Semyon, who had fought alongside the Norwegian Resistance and died during a battle. As a testament to his sacrifice and heroism, he rests eternally in Norwegian soil. The story highlights the sacrifices and heroism of the Savelyevs in the face of adversity.

Polipov becomes aware of the trial taking place in Kiev, which involves the prosecution of Ukrainian nationalists and the conviction of Valentik. As the trial progresses, Polipov's own involvement in the matter becomes known, leading to the regional committee of the party launching an official investigation into his case. During the investigation, it is uncovered that Polipov had collaborated with the Tsarist guards, a revelation that ultimately leads to his expulsion from the party. Meanwhile, Polycarp Kruzhilin's son assumes the position of chairman at the collective farm "Krasniy Partisan" following these events. Additionally, Fyodor Savelyev's son Dmitry receives a letter from Ganka, who extends an invitation for him to join her.

== Cast ==
Savelievs

- Pyotr Lyubeshkin as Silanty Savelyev, head of the family
- Vladimir Borisov as Semyon
- Tamara Degtyaryova as Agatha
- Vladimir Zemlyanikin as Grigory
- Nikolai Ivanov as Ivan
- Nikolai Lebedev as Mitrofan
- Ada Rogovtseva as Anna (née Kaftanova)
- Aleksei Serebryakov as Dima
- Vadim Spiridonov as Fyodor
- Valeri Khlevinsky as Anton

Others

- Tamara Syomina as Anfisa
- Oleg Basilashvili as Arnold Mikhailovich Lakhnovsky, officer of the tsarist secret police, later an officer of the Abwehr
- Pyotr Velyaminov as Polycarp Kruzhilin
- Zinaida Vorkul as Markovna
- Vladimir Zamansky as Fyodor Nechayev
- Boris Ivanov as whiteguard general
- Mikhail Kokshenov as Arkady Molchun
- Yefim Kopelyan as Mikhail Lukich Kaftanov
- Vera Kuznetsova as Glafira Dementyevna
- Natalya Kustinskaya as Polina
- Ivan Lapikov as Pankrat Nazarov
- Rimma Markova as Vasilisa
- Andrey Martynov as Kiryan Inyutin
- Radner Muratov as Magomedov
- Olga Naumenko as Varya
- Leonid Kharitonov as Yegor
- Yuri Smirnov as Polipov
- Yelena Drapeko as Vera
- Nikolay Ivanov as Ivan

== Awards ==
The series was awarded the USSR State Prize in the field of literature, art, and architecture.
