= Yevgeny Knyazev =

Russian theatre and film actor (born 1955)

PAR Yevgeny Knyazev
- Евгений Князев
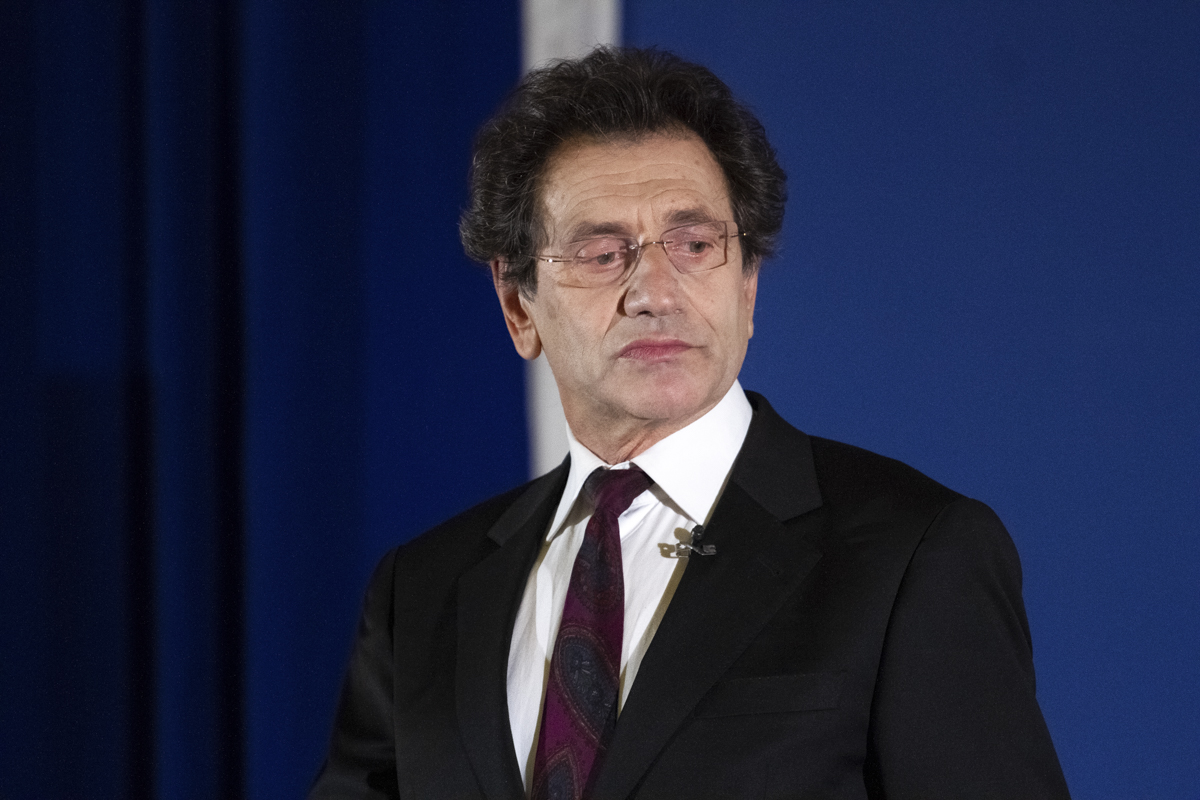
- Knyazev in 2018
- Born: Yevgeny Vladimirovich Knyazev; 9 August 1955 (age 71); Tula, Russian SFSR, Soviet Union
- Citizenship: Soviet (1955–1991); Russian (1991–present)
- Education: Boris Shchukin Theatre Institute
- Occupations: Actor, drama teacher
- Years active: 1982–present
- Known for: Rector of the Boris Shchukin Theatre Institute (since 2003)
- Spouse: Yelena Dunaeva
- Children: 3
- Awards: Order "For Merit to the Fatherland", 3rd, 4th class Order of Honour; People's Artist of Russia; Merited Artist of the Russian Federation; State Prize of the Russian Federation; Russian Federation Presidential Certificate of Honour
- Website: http://www.knjazev.com/

Yevgeny Vladimirovich Knyazev, PAR (Russian: Евгений Владимирович Князев; Born 9 August 1955) is a Russian stage and film actor and drama teacher. He has served as rector of the Boris Shchukin Theatre Institute since 2003.

== Biography ==
Yevgeny Knyazev was born in the suburb of Tula, the settlement of Skuratovo (now within the city limits), into a working-class family.

He graduated from the Tula Polytechnic Institute in 1977 with a degree in mining engineering. During his studies, he began acting in the institute's amateur theater and later in the "Dialog" People's Theater at the Tula Trade Unions Palace of Culture. In 1978, he enrolled in the Boris Shchukin Theatre Institute. Upon graduation in 1982, he was accepted into the Vakhtangov State Academic Theatre. During his work at the theater, he has performed in more than twenty plays.

He made his film debut in 1983.

Since the mid-1990s, he has performed in commercial theater productions and at various theaters.

Since 1994, he has been teaching at the Boris Shchukin Theatre Institute (serving as its rector since 2003). As an artistic director, he has graduated two acting classes (in 1998 and 2004). He currently heads a special course for the Moscow Operetta Theatre.

== Public activity ==
Knyazev is a member of the public council of the Russian Jewish Congress.

In March 2014, he signed a letter of support for the Russian annexation of Crimea.

During the 2018 Moscow mayoral election, he was a trusted person of mayoral candidate Sergey Sobyanin.

In 2022, Knyazev supported the Russian invasion of Ukraine.

During the 2024 Russian presidential election, he was a trusted person of presidential candidate Vladimir Putin.

== Selected filmography ==
- The Master and Margarita (2024) as Mikhail Berlioz
- Orlova and Alexandrov (2015) as Joseph Stalin
- House with Lilies (2014) as Arefiev
- Wolf Messing: Who Saw through Time (2009) as Wolf Messing
- December Heat (2008) as Grigory Zinoviev
- The Funeral Party (2007) as the popular author
- Travelling with Pets (2007) as the priest
- Nine Lives of Nestor Makhno (2007) as Leon Trotsky
- Escape (2005) as Vetrov's neighbor
- On Upper Maslovka Street (2004) as Matvey

== Awards ==
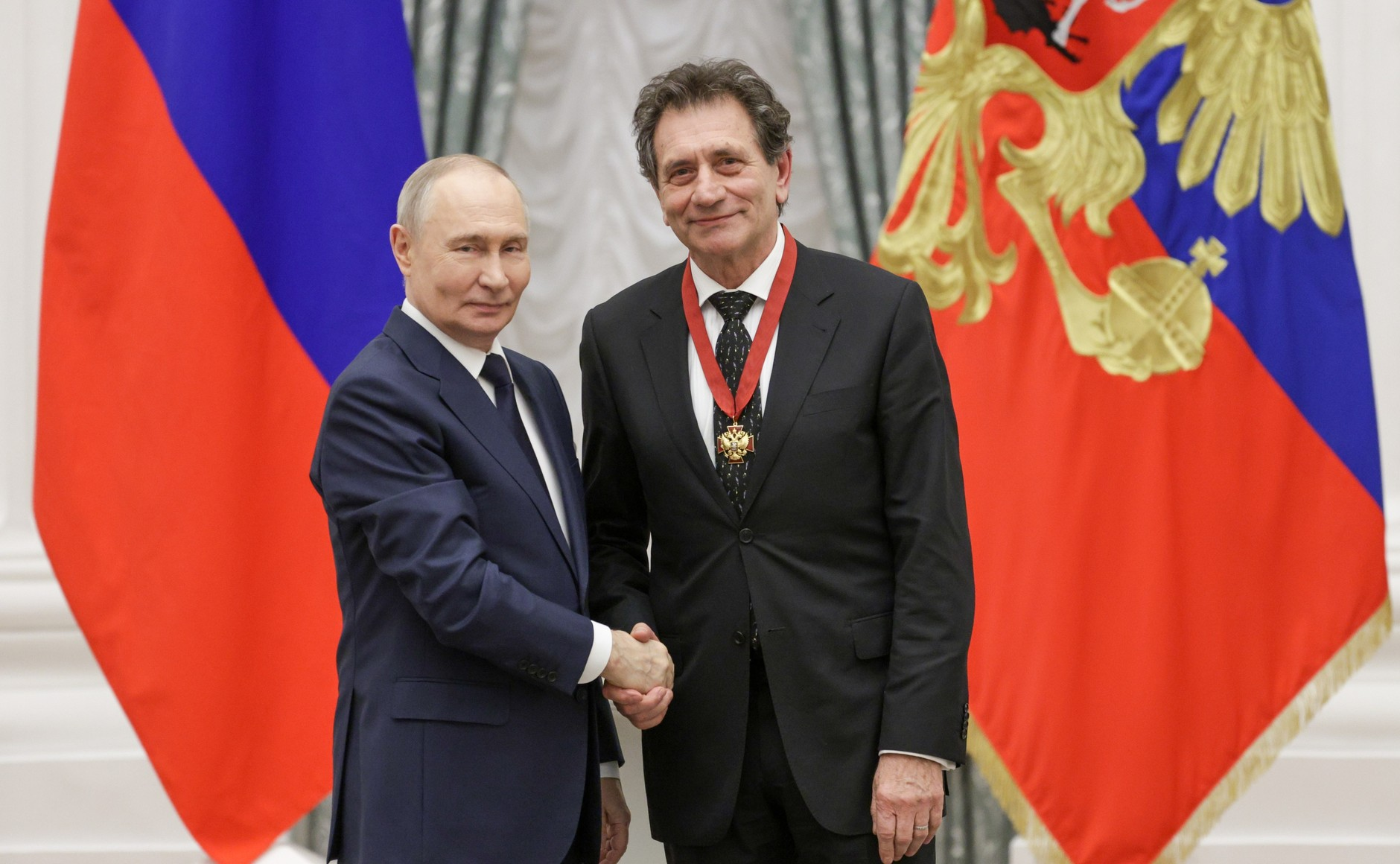
Vladimir Putin awards Yevgeny Knyazev with the Order "For Merit to the Fatherland", 3rd class, 24 December 2025

- Russian Federation Presidential Certificate of Honour (2021)
- Order "For Merit to the Fatherland"
  - 3rd class (2025)
  - 4th class (2019)
- Order of Honour (2010)
- People's Artist of Russia (2001)
- Merited Artist of the Russian Federation (1996)
- State Prize of the Russian Federation in literature and art (1995)
