= Nartsane War (1769) =

Kabardian (Eastern Circassian) Uprising against Russian influence over their state

Kabardian Uprising
- Part of Russo-Circassian War
Date	May – June 1769
Location	Kabardia; Beshtau region
Result	Russian victory

Belligerents
(Russia) Russian Empire	Kabardia (East Circassia)

Commanders and leaders
(Russia) Major General De-Medem (Russia) Ataman Savelyev	Misost the Great

Strength
Several regiments of regular army and Cossacks	Several hundred armed Kabardians

Casualties and losses
Unknown	Unknown

The Nartsane War, or the 1769 Kabardian Uprising was an important event in the early stages of the Russo-Circassian war, which saw the Kabardian people resist Russian expansion in the North Caucasus. In May 1769, General-Major De-Medem led Russian forces into Kabardia, a region in the North Caucasus.

== History ==
On May 29, 1769, the Russian forces, including several regiments, were sent to confront the rebels at the source of the Kuban River. The rebels put up a determined resistance, and the Russian forces were initially repelled. However, less than a week later, a much larger Russian contingent was dispatched to quell the uprising.

On June 6, 1769, a decisive battle took place near the Eshkakon River. The Kabardians fought heroically, but they were met with fierce resistance from the Cossacks led by Ataman Savelyev. The battle continued until nightfall, and by the morning, the Kabardians, realizing the futility of their position, agreed to submit to the Russian command.

Following the battle, most of the Kabardian rebels, who had taken refuge in the mountains, were forced to return to their homes in the foothills.
