= Wolf Messing: Who Saw through Time =

Russian television series

- Genre: History; Drama
- Created by: Eduard Volodarsky
- Directed by: Vladimir Krasnopolsky, Valery Uskov
- Starring: Yevgeny Knyazev; Tara Amirkhanova; Mark Rudinstein; Alexander Khinkis; Roman Grechishkin; Viktor Rakov
- Composer: Yevgeny Shiryaev
- Country of origin: Russian Federation
- Original language: Russian
- No. of seasons: 1
- No. of episodes: 16

Production
- Producers: Anatoly Chizhikov; Sergey Danielyan; Aram Movsesyan; Ruben Dishdishyan
- Cinematography: Timur Zelma
- Running time: 45 minutes
- Production company: Central Partnership

Original release
- Network: Russia 1
- Release: November 15, 2009

Wolf Messing: Who Saw Through Time (Russian: Вольф Мессинг: видевший сквозь время, romanized: Wolf Messing: Videvshiy skvoz' vremya) is a Russian TV series about fate of Wolf Messing, based on the novel of the same name by the screenwriter Eduard Volodarsky. by the Russia-1 TV channel. The series premiered on the Russia-1 on November 15, 2009.

== Plot ==
Messing was born in the last year of the nineteenth century and became one of the most mysterious and fateful personalities of the twentieth century. A boy from a poor Jewish family, he was forced to start an independent life early. After leaving for Germany, he took on the most menial work. His supernatural telepathic abilities were discovered quite accidentally, by two Jews, under almost mystical circumstances (one of them, the doctor, discovered that the "dead" boy was not dead). They also begin to promote him as an artist, and Messing spends his first public performances in the Berlin Panopticon. The audience remains in awe. Weimar Germany, scarred by the consequences of the First World War, was a place that attracted charlatans and mystics, great scientists and maniacs.

Soon the chaos of the Weimar Republic is replaced by the iron system of Nazi Germany. And here Messing is in demand as never before. In 1937, when the Third Reich is at the height of its glory, Messing predicts a swift and inglorious end to the "millennial Reich" in the event of an attack on the East. Believing in their own prediction, with Hitler's capture of Poland Messing crosses the border The Soviet Union. So life for him was divided into two equal halves.

In the Soviet Union, Wolf Messing is listed as a hypnotist and magician, being both an experimenter and a test subject, and unofficially becomes an astrologer of Stalin. He holds secrets that no one can share, secrets that will die with him.

== Cast ==
- Yevgeny Knyazev as Wolf G. Messing
  - Alexander Khinkis as Wolf Messing as a child
  - Roman Grechishkin as Wolf Messing in his youth
- Alexander Klyukvin as Ilya Petrovich
- Tara Amirkhanova as Aida Mikhailovna Messing-Rappaport, Messing's wife
- Veronika Itskovich as Sarah, Messing's mother
- Vasily Savinov as Gregory, Messing's father
- Mikhail Gorevoy as Erik Jan Hanussen
- Vladimir Dolinsky as Peter Zellmeister, Messing's impresario
- Andrey Ilyin as Albert Einstein
- Boris Plotnikov as Sigmund Freud
- Vitaly Kudryavtsev as Konstantin Kovalev, pilot
- Yuri Nifontov as Dr. Karl Abel
- Ivan Agapov as Dr. Lev Kobak
- Roman Pechersky as Paul Vogt
- Viktor Rakov as Wilhelm Canaris
- Mark Rudinstein as Osip Yefremovich
- Aleksei Petrenko as Joseph Stalin
- Georgy Teslya-Gerasimov as Vasily Stalin
- Vladimir Shcherbakov as Lavrentiy Beria
- Vladimir Chuprikov as Nikita Khrushchev
- Oleg Chernihiv as Leonid Brezhnev
- Sarkis Amirzyan as Anastas Mikoyan
- Sergey Klanovsky as Mikhail Suslov
- Dmitry Yachevsky as Adolf Hitler
- Vasily Belokopytov as NKVD agent
- Yuri Shlykov as Viktor Abakumov
- Lyubov Rumyantseva as Raisa Andreyevna
- Pyotr Yurchenkov Jr. as cadet of the intelligence school
- Alexander Luchinin as Military
- Edita Herbus as Anna Vogt
- Andrey Podubinsky as episode

== Film crew ==
- The author of the script: Eduard Volodarsky
- Directors: Vladimir Krasnopolsky, Valery Uskov
- Director of Photography: Timur Zelma
- Composer: Yevgeny Shiryaev
- Artists:
  - Ivan Rogoten
  - Vladislav Travinsky
- Producers:
  - Anatoly Chizhikov
  - Sergey Danielyan
  - Aram Movsesian
  - Ruben Dishdishyan

== Criticism ==
In general, the plot of the film is completely based on the legendary and not reliably confirmed biography of Messing. Shows meetings (which most likely didn't happen in reality) with Einstein, Freud, Hanussen, By Hitler and Stalin, shows Messing's alleged escape from a German prison by hypnotizing the guards, etc., which was noted by many critics of the film. In addition, there are many historical and visual inaccuracies in the film, including Messing's date of birth itself.

"In 2009, unexpectedly good ratings were given to the artistically insignificant series Wolf Messing: Who Saw Through Time. Venerable screenwriter Eduard Volodarsky collected all the legends and myths about the Honored Artist of the RSFSR Wolf Grigoryevich Messing-a mentalist who performed in the USSR with psychological experiments "on reading the thoughts" of the audience. Directors Uskov and Krasnopolsky put all the crazy stories up to Messing's acquaintance with Freud, Einstein, Hitler and Stalin on the screen. They swindled the "mentalist" almost to the scale of a biblical prophet..." (Alexander Kondrashov, Leningrad State University, 2013)

== Plagiarism ==
In the series, music from the soundtracks to other films was used (not specified in the credits).

- The theme of the title credits of the third season of the TV series Babylon 5 (by composer Christopher Franke) — accompanied by the closing credits of each episode;
- Theme from the kiss scene of Zhou Chang and Harry Potter from the movie Harry Potter and the Order of the Phoenix (by composer Nicholas Hooper) — in scenes where Messing shows his abilities.
