= Valeri Khlevinsky =

Soviet and Russian actor (1943–2021)

Valery Mikhailovich Khlevinsky (Russian: Валерий Михайлович Хлевинский; 14 November 1943 – 7 January 2021) was a Soviet and Russian theater and film actor and theater teacher. He was awarded the People's Artist of Russia in 2002. Best known for his role as Anton Savelyev in the epic series Eternal Call. He was born in Nizhny Novgorod in a family of deaf parents, and died, aged 77, in Moscow.
