= Stewardess (film) =

- Directed by: Vladimir Krasnopolsky; Valery Uskov
- Written by: Bella Akhmadulina; Yuri Nagibin
- Starring: Alla Demidova; Georgiy Zhzhonov; Vladimir Etush
- Music by: Leonid Afanasyev
- Distributed by: Mosfilm
- Release date: October 28, 1967 (world premiere)
- Running time: 36 minutes
- Country: Soviet Union
- Language: Russian

Stewardess (Russian: Стюардесса, romanized: Styuardessa) is a 1967 Soviet black-and-white short romance film. The plot is centered on a stewardess Olga servicing a domestic flight. The story reveals that she is in love with a geologist and became a stewardess to have an opportunity to meet him occasionally on a remote Siberian airfield.

The film won two special jury awards at the Golden Prague International Television Festival in 1968 and 1969.

== Cast ==
- Alla Demidova as Olga Ivanovna
- Georgiy Zhzhonov as passenger-screenwriter
- Vladimir Etush as Caucasian passenger
- Ivan Ryzhov as passenger with children's toys
- Valentina Vladimirova as scandalous passenger
- Yevgeniy Yevstigneyev as drunk passenger
