= On Upper Maslovka Street =

- Russian: На Верхней Масловке
- Directed by: Konstantin Khudyakov
- Written by: Vladilen Arsenev
- Starring: Alisa Freindlikh; Yevgeny Mironov; Alyona Babenko; Yevgeny Knyazev; Ekaterina Guseva
- Cinematography: Dilshat Fatkhulin
- Music by: Aleksey Shelygin
- Production company: Mosfilm
- Release date: 2004
- Running time: 115 min.
- Countries: Russia; France
- Language: Russian

On Upper Maslovka Street (Russian: На Верхней Масловке, romanized: Na Verkhney Maslovke) is a 2004 Russian drama film directed by Konstantin Khudyakov.

== Plot ==
The film tells the story of an elderly woman Anna Borisovna, who in the past was a successful sculptor, and the director of the amateur theater Peter, who had a good start to his career, but then he lost ground. He does not have his own housing and Anna Borisovna took it to her, and he, in turn, looks after her. They are very different, but despite this they live together for many years.

== Cast ==
- Alisa Freindlikh as Anna Borisovna
- Yevgeny Mironov as Petya
- Alyona Babenko as Nina
- Yevgeny Knyazev as Matvey
- Ekaterina Guseva as Katya
- Dmitry Kulichkov as Semyon Kraychuk
- Ilya Rutberg as Music Teacher
- Anna Gulyarenko as Petya's mother
- Inga Strelkova-Oboldina as Roza (as Inga Oboldina)
- Fyodor Dobronravov as Katya's father
- Roman Madyanov as taxi driver
- Danila Kozlovsky as Modigliani
