= Savely =

Savely, Saveli or Saveliy (Russian: Савелий) is a Russian masculine given name. Its shortened versions include Savel and Sava. It may refer to:

- Saveli Chitanava, Chairman of the State Committee for Ecology and the Environment of Abkhazia
- Savely Govorkov, a fictional character in Soviet novels
- Savely Kramarov (1934–1995), Russian comic actor
- Savely Zeydenberg (1862–1942), Russian painter
