= Not Under the Jurisdiction =

- Russian film poster
- Russian: Неподсуден
- Directed by: Vladimir Krasnopolsky; Valery Uskov
- Written by: Konstantin Isaev; Lev Yushchenko
- Starring: Oleg Strizhenov; Lyudmila Maksakova; Leonid Kuravlyov; Olga Soshnikova; Svetlana Svetlichnaya; Pyotr Glebov
- Cinematography: Pyotr Yemelyanov
- Edited by: Valentina Korovkina
- Music by: Leonid Afanasyev
- Production company: Mosfilm
- Release date: 1969
- Running time: 87 minutes
- Country: Soviet Union
- Language: Russian

Not Under the Jurisdiction (Russian: Неподсуден, romanized: Nepodsuden) is a 1969 Soviet drama film directed by Vladimir Krasnopolsky and Valery Uskov.

The film shows how a tragic aircraft accident and a web of deceit derail the lives of two pilots, only for their paths to intersect 16 years later aboard a flight where long-buried truths come to light, reshaping their fates forever.

== Plot ==
During a training flight, a jet trainer aircraft suffers a catastrophic failure. The radio operator, Sorokin, panics and ejects from the burning aircraft without authorization, abandoning his crew. His desertion leaves the aircraft without communication, leading to the death of the commander, Tsyganko. Sorokin, the first to land, quickly files a report claiming he jumped at the last moment, whereas the second pilot, Yegorov, supposedly ejected immediately after the engine caught fire without awaiting orders. This false report shifts suspicion onto Yegorov, complicating the investigation into the tragedy.

Although Yegorov is not formally charged—his account that he ejected under Tsyganko's direct orders cannot be confirmed or disproven—he resigns from the pilot retraining program for civil aviation. His dreams of flying jet airliners end, and he moves to a small aviation role piloting an An-2, transporting passengers and livestock. His decision is deeply influenced by his fiancée, Nadya, a lawyer and future judge, who is misled by Sorokin’s fabricated account. Sorokin cunningly presents himself as a victim, sowing doubt about Yegorov's integrity. Unable to counter the narrative or regain Nadya's trust, Yegorov withdraws, heartbroken. Sorokin, though also not formally convicted due to lack of evidence, faces professional ostracism and leaves aviation to work at a radio factory in Omsk. Meanwhile, Yegorov rebuilds his life, marrying his devoted admirer Olya and finding contentment despite lingering emotional scars.

Sixteen years later, the lives of these characters intersect once more. Sorokin is now married to Nadya, raising a son who is unaware that Yegorov is his biological father. Yegorov, though haunted by his inability to truly love Olya, finds solace in his daughter and eventually returns to major aviation through the support of a former instructor. Fate brings the Sorokin family aboard a Tu-104 piloted by Captain Yegorov during a flight from Novosibirsk to Moscow. Mid-flight, a confrontation unravels long-buried truths, offering redemption to some, justice to others, and a glimmer of hope for a new beginning.

== Cast ==
- Oleg Strizhenov as Yegorov Sergey
- Lyudmila Maksakova as Nadya
- Leonid Kuravlyov as Sorokin
- Olga Soshnikova as Olya
- Svetlana Svetlichnaya as Vika
- Pyotr Glebov as Pyotr Samoylov
- Sergey Nikonenko as Innokentiy
- Vladimir Gusev as Tsyganok
- Vladimir Kuznetsov as Seryozha (as Volodya Kuznetsov)
- Nikolai Lirov
