= The Slowest Train =

- Russian: Самый медленный поезд
- Directed by: Vladimir Krasnopolsky; Valery Uskov
- Written by: Yuri Nagibin
- Starring: Pavel Kadochnikov; Nonna Terentyeva; Zinaida Kirienko; Anatoli Barchuk; Marina Burova
- Cinematography: Gennadi Chereshko
- Edited by: Lyudmila Chuzo
- Music by: Leonid Afanasyev
- Production company: Sverdlovskaya Kinostudiya
- Release date: 1963
- Running time: 80 minute
- Country: Soviet Union
- Language: Russian

The Slowest Train (Russian: Самый медленный поезд, romanized: Samyy medlennyy poyezd) is a 1963 Soviet war film directed by Vladimir Krasnopolsky and Valery Uskov.

== Plot ==
In the spring of 1943, during the Great Patriotic War, a military train departs from a liberated city, transporting prisoners of war to the rear. Attached to the train is a special carriage carrying a divisional printing press and Captain Sergeyev, a frontline correspondent.

Though initially expecting to travel alone, Sergeyev finds his carriage gradually filling with uninvited passengers: a wounded soldier with a young girl, a pregnant woman and her companion, two party officials, an actress, and others. Despite the unexpected company, Sergeyev cannot bring himself to turn them away, as each passenger carries their own scars of war. Only one passenger, an opportunistic smuggler who traveled from Siberia to profit in the frontline zone, is expelled for his greed.

During the journey, the pregnant woman gives birth to a baby girl, who is named Lena. The train eventually reaches its destination, the town of Borisoglebsk.

Twenty years later, Sergeyev reunites with the grown Lena and brings her to the place where he first encountered her mother and witnessed her father's death.

== Cast ==
- Pavel Kadochnikov
- Nonna Terentyeva as Lena (as Nonna Novosyadlova)
- Zinaida Kirienko as Nina Ivanovna
- Anatoli Barchuk as Kolya
- Marina Burova as girl
- Alla Surkova
- Valentina Vladimirova
- Lyudmila Shagalova as Varvara
