= Vladimir Krasnopolsky =

Russian film director and screenwriter (1933–2022)

- Born: Vladimir Arkadyevich Krasnopolsky; 14 June 1933; Sverdlovsk, Russian SFSR, Soviet Union
- Died: 23 September 2022 (aged 89); Moscow, Russia
- Education: Ural State University; Gerasimov Institute of Cinematography
- Occupations: Film director Screenwriter
- Relatives: Valery Uskov (second cousin)

Vladimir Arkadyevich Krasnopolsky (Russian: Влади́мир Арка́дьевич Краснопо́льский; 14 June 1933 – 23 September 2022) was a Russian film director, producer, and screenwriter.

== Biography ==
Krasnopolsky was born in Sverdlovsk on 14 June 1933 to artist Arkady Vladimirovich Krasnopolsky. In 1955, he graduated from the Faculty of History and Philology at Ural State University and from Gerasimov Institute of Cinematography in 1963. From 1961 to 1963, he was director of the Sverdlovsk Film Studio. In 1964, he became director of Mosfilm. In 1971, he joined the Communist Party of the Soviet Union.

From 1963 to 2015, he directed and wrote all of his films alongside his second cousin, Valery Uskov. They went their separate ways in 2016.

Krasnopolsky died in Moscow on 23 September 2022, at the age of 89.

== Filmography ==
- The Slowest Train (1963)
- Stewardess (1967)
- Not Under the Jurisdiction (1969)
- Shadows Disappear at Noon (1971)
- Eternal Call (1973)
- Night Fun (1991)
- The Thief (1994)
- Yermak (1996)
- Detectives (2001)
- Provincials (2002)
- Unlicensed Detective (2003)
- Pautina (2007)
- The Ermolovs (2009)
- Wolf Messing: Who Saw through Time (2009)
- House with Lilies (2014)

== Distinctions ==
- Honored Artist of the RSFSR (1978)
- USSR State Prize (1979)
- Lenin Komsomol Prize (1980)
- People's Artist of the RSFSR (1983)
- Order of Honour (1997)
- Order "For Merit to the Fatherland" (2004)
