= Viktor Savelyev =

Soviet and Russian surgeon (1928–2013)

- Born: Viktor Sergeyevich Savelyev; 24 February 1928; Pakhotny Ugol, Tambovsky Uyezd, Tambov Governorate, Russian SFSR, Soviet Union
- Died: 25 December 2013 (aged 85); Moscow, Russia
- Medical career
- Profession: Surgeon
- Field: Lung surgeon; Heart surgeon; Vascular surgeon; Diagnostic and therapeutic endoscopy
- Institutions: Russian Academy of Sciences

Viktor Sergeyevich Savelyev (Russian: Ви́ктор Серге́евич Саве́льев; 24 February 1928 – 25 December 2013) was a Soviet and Russian surgeon. He was a full member of the Russian Academy of Sciences, from 1997 until his death, and of the Russian Academy of Medical Sciences. He was also a member of the Presidium of the Academy of Medical Sciences and Head of the Department of Surgery of the Russian State Medical University. He died on 25 December 2013 in Moscow, Russia at the age of 85. He is buried at Troyekurovskoye Cemetery in Moscow, along with his wife Galina Savelyeva.

== Awards and honors ==
- Order of the Red Banner of Labour (1973)
- USSR State Prize (1975)
- Order of Lenin (1978)
- Hero of Socialist Labour (1988)
- State Prize of the Russian Federation (1993)
- Order "For Merit to the Fatherland":
  - 4th class (1996)
  - 3rd class (2003)
  - 2nd class (2007)
- Demidov Prize (2002)
