= Zaimka =

Zaimka Заимка
- Selo
- Location within Bashkortostan Location within Russia
- Coordinates: 56°05′N 57°34′E
- Country: Russia
- Region: Bashkortostan
- District: Duvansky District
- Time zone: UTC+5:00

Zaimka (Russian: Заимка) is a rural locality (a selo) and the administrative centre of Zaimkinsky Selsoviet, Duvansky District, Bashkortostan, Russia. The population was 220 as of 2010. There are 5 streets.

== Geography ==
Zaimka is located 105 km northwest of Mesyagutovo (the district's administrative centre) by road. Ust-Ayaz is the nearest rural locality.
