= Valery Uskov =

Russian film and television director (1933–2025)

- Валерий Усков
- Born: Valery Ivanovich Uskov; 22 April 1933; Sverdlovsk, Ural Oblast, Russian SFSR, USSR
- Died: 24 August 2025 (aged 92)
- Occupations: Director; screenwriter
- Years active: 1963–2024
- Relatives: Vladimir Krasnopolsky (second cousin)

Valery Ivanovich Uskov (Russian: Вале́рий Ива́нович Уско́в; 22 April 1933 – 24 August 2025) was a Russian film and television director and screenwriter. He was known for directing the films The Slowest Train (1963), Stewardess (1967) and Not Under the Jurisdiction (1969), as well as episodes of the historical television series Eternal Call. He directed almost all of his films alongside his second cousin, Vladimir Krasnopolsky. The two separated in 2016.

Uskov graduated from Ural State University in 1955, and from the Gerasimov Institute of Cinematography in 1961. He worked at Sverdlovsk Film Studio, was director of Mosfilm, and staged the plays Her Friend and On the Wedding Day by Viktor Rozov at the Moscow Gorky Academic Art Theatre.

Uskov was a recipient of the People's Artist of the RSFSR (1983). He died on 24 August 2025, at the age of 92.
