= Galina Savelyeva =

Russian gynaecologist (1928–2022)

- Савельєва Галина Михайлівна
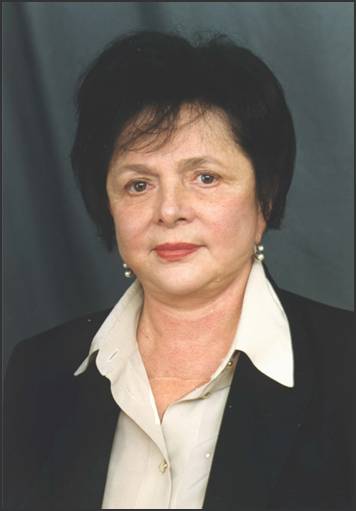
- Born: 23 February 1928; Kuvaka, Penza Province, USSR
- Died: 29 November 2022 (aged 94); Moscow, Russia
- Resting place: Troyekurovskoye Cemetery, Moscow, Russia
- Education: Russian National Research Medical University (PhD)
- Spouse: Viktor Sergeevich Savelyev
- Awards: Silver Medal of the Exhibition of Achievements of National Economy; Order of the Badge of Honour; USSR State Prize; Order of Friendship; Honoured Science Worker of the Russian Federation; Order "For Merit to the Fatherland", 4th class Hero of Labour of the Russian Federation
- Scientific career
- Fields: Gynaecology
- Workplaces: Russian National Research Medical University; Moscow State University; Russian Association of Obstetricians and Gynaecologists; Russian Academy of Sciences
- Doctoral advisor: Leonid Semenovich Persianinov

Galina Mikhailovna Savelyeva (Russian: Галина Михайлівна Савельєва; 23 February 1928 – 29 November 2022) was a Russian gynaecologist and educator. She was vice-president of the Russian Association of Obstetricians and Gynaecologists and a full member of the Russian Academy of Sciences. She was honoured with awards including Order of the Badge of Honour (1976), Honoured Science Worker of the Russian Federation (2003) and Hero of Labour of the Russian Federation (2018).

== Biography ==
Savelyeva was born on 23 February 1928 in Kuvaka, Penza Province, USSR. Her father was a petroleum engineer and her mother was a teacher.

Savelyeva studied general medicine at the Russian National Research Medical University, graduating in 1951. Her doctorate was supervised by Leonid Semenovich Persianinov [ru] and was defended in 1959.

From 1954 to 1960, Savelyeva worked as an obstetrician-gynaecologist at a Moscow City Clinical Hospital No. 1. From 1971 to 2017 Savelyeva was head of the Department of Obstetrics and Gynaecology at the Russian National Research Medical University. In 2000, she founded the Department of Obstetrics and Gynaecology at Moscow State University.

Savelyeva was Vice-President of the Russian Association of Obstetricians and Gynaecologists, a member of the Russian Academy of Medicine and was a full member of the Russian Academy of Sciences.

Savelyeva was one of the first scientists in the world to demonstrate the feasibility of using craniocerebral hypothermia in the treatment of babies born with asphyxia, which formed the basis for the Russian Ministry of Health's order on the primary resuscitation of babies born with asphyxia.

Savelyeva died on 29 November 2022 in Moscow, Russia, aged 94. She is buried at Troyekurovskoye Cemetery in Moscow, along with her husband Viktor Sergeevich Savelyev.

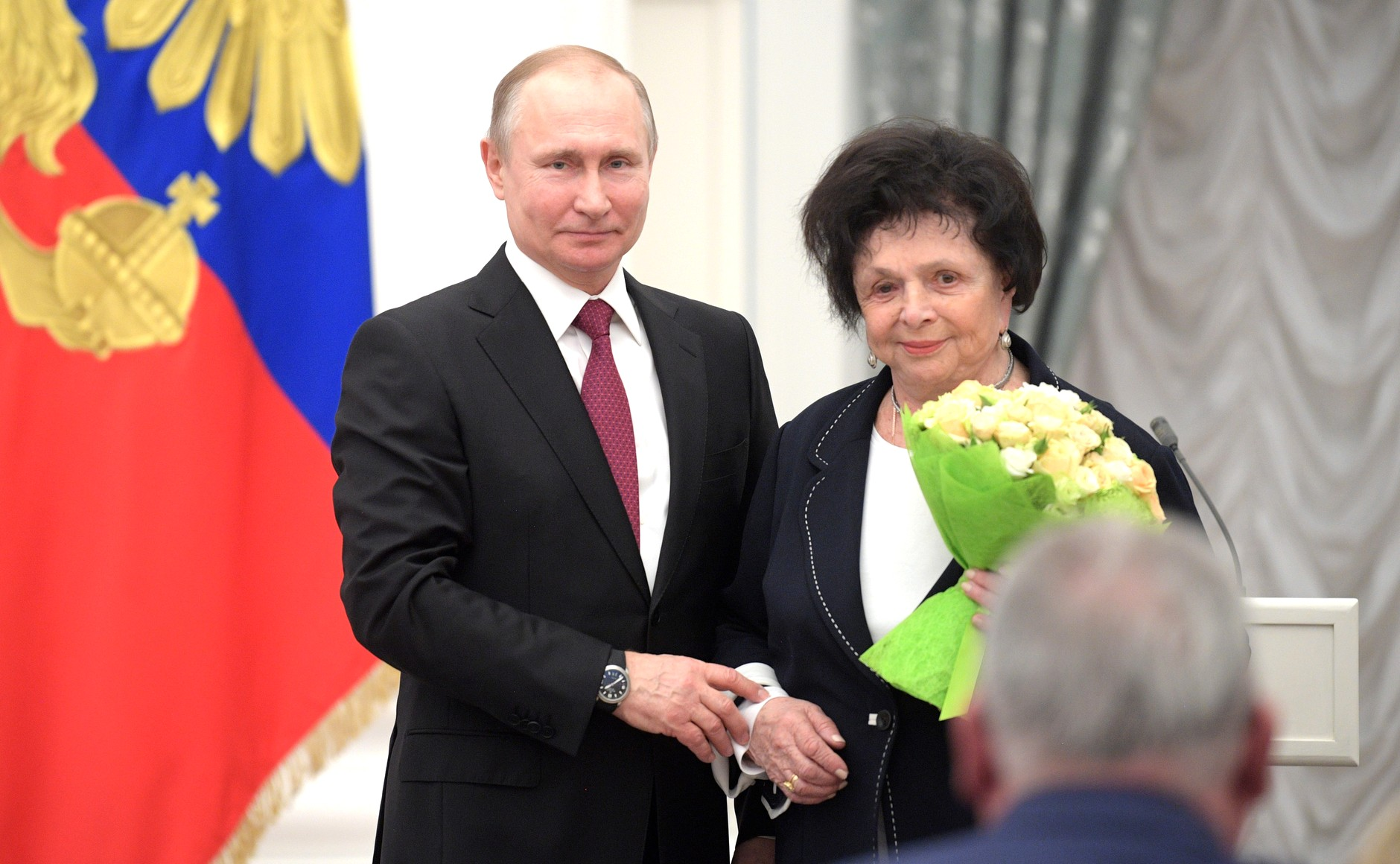
Savelyeva with President Vladimir Putin in 2018

== Honours ==
- Silver Medal of the Exhibition of Achievements of National Economy (VDNKh, 1969)
- Order of the Badge of Honour (1976)
- USSR State Prize (1986)
- Order of Friendship (1997)
- Moscow Mayor's Prize (2001)
- Russian Federation Government Prize for the Development and Implementation of Endoscopic Methods in Gynaecology (2002)
- Honoured Science Worker of the Russian Federation (2003)
- Order "For Merit to the Fatherland", 4th class (2007)
- Lifetime achievement award from the World Association of Perinatal Medicine (2014)
- Hero of Labour of the Russian Federation (2018)
