= Dmitry Savelyev =

Dmitry Savelyev or Dmitry Saveliev may refer to:

- Dmitry Savelyev (politician, born 1968), Russian politician
- Dmitry Savelyev (politician, born 1971), Russian politician
- Dmitry Saveliev (pair skater), Russian pair skater
- Dmitry Savelyev (bandy player) (born 1979), Russian bandy player
- Dmitry Savelyev (politician, born 1906) (1906—1965), Soviet organizer of industrial production and party activist
