= Savel =

Savel may refer to

- Mayres-Savel, a commune in the Isère department in southeastern France
- Rimon-et-Savel, a commune in the Drôme department in southeastern France
- Dava Savel, American television producer and writer
- Savel Rădulescu (1885-1970), Romanian diplomat
