= Wolf Messing =

Russian telepathist, hypnotist, occultist (1899–1974)

Wolf Messing Во́льф Ме́ссинг (in Russian) Wolf Messing (in Polish) וולף מסינג (in Hebrew)
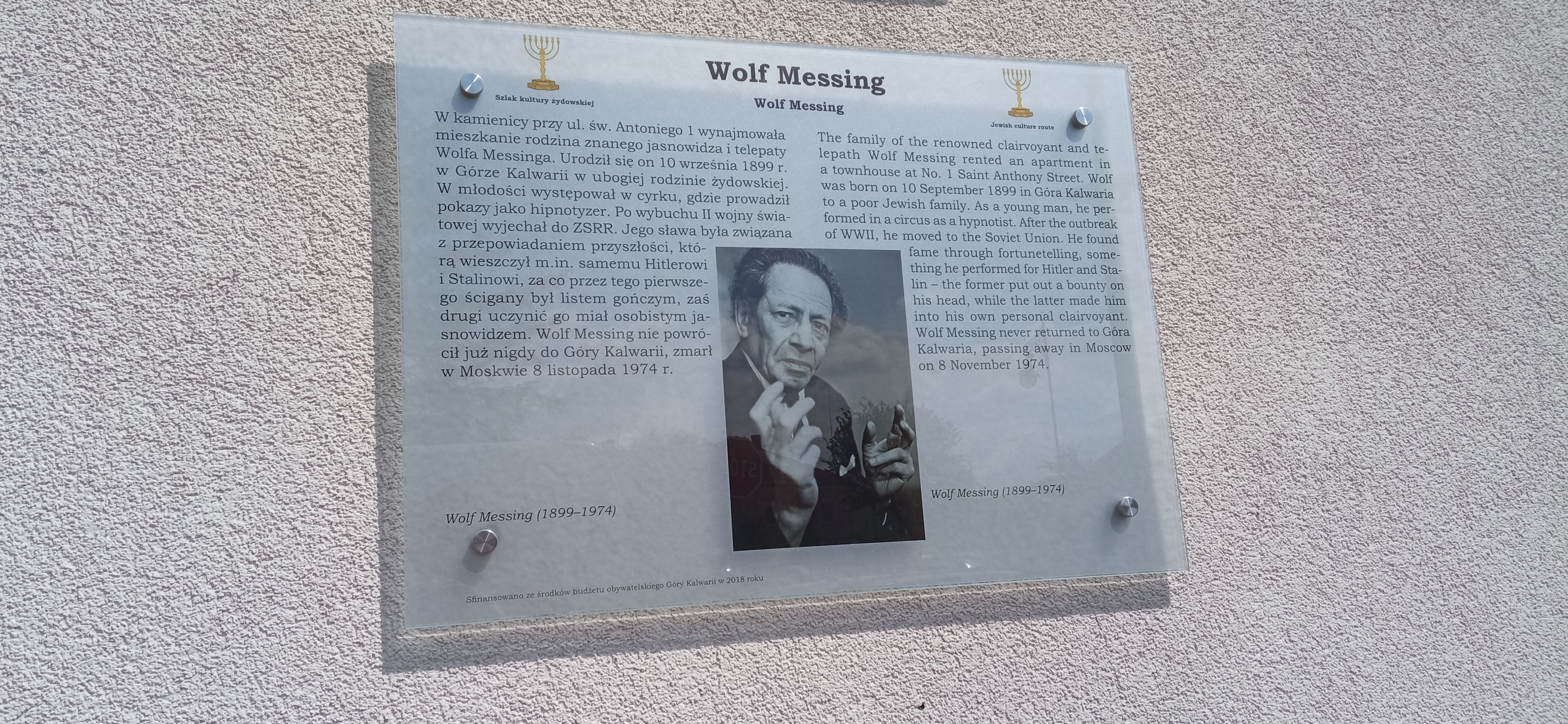
- Plaque dedicated to Wolf Messing in Góra Kalwaria, Poland
- Born: Wolf Grigoryevich Messing; 10 September 1899; Góra Kalwaria, Warsaw Governorate, Congress Poland, Russian Empire
- Died: 8 November 1974 (aged 75); Moscow, Russian SFSR, USSR
- Occupations: Clairvoyant, Telepathist, Hypnotist
- Known for: Supernatural experiments

Wolf Grigoryevich (Gershkovich) Messing (Russian: Во́льф Григо́рьевич (Ге́ршикович) Ме́ссинг, Polish: Wolf Grigoriewicz Messing, Hebrew: וולף מסינג) (10 September 1899 – 8 November 1974) was a self-proclaimed psychic, telepath and stage hypnotist.

== Early life ==
Messing was born to a Jewish family in the village of Góra Kalwaria, 25 km southeast of Warsaw. He claimed that his psychic abilities developed in his early life.

== Career ==
By the time he was a teenager, he was performing for the public as a psychic entertainer.

In the interview with P. Oreshkin, Messing said:

... It's not mind-reading, it's like the "reading of muscles"... When a human thinks hard about something, the brain cells transmit impulses to all muscles of the body. Their movements, invisible to the eye, I can easily feel... Often I'm performing mental tasks without direct contact with the inductor. The pointer to me here is the breathing frequency of inductor, the beating of his heart, voice timbre, his walking nature etc.

== Death ==
Messing died in a hospital, on 8 November 1974, two months after his 75th birthday. He had successfully undergone surgery on the femoral and external iliac arteries, but afterward, for some unknown reason, developed kidney failure and pulmonary edema. He was buried at the Vostryakovskoje Jewish cemetery in Moscow.

His life story is depicted in the Russian television miniseries Wolf Messing: Who Saw through Time (2009).

== Appearances in fiction ==
Wolf Messing is a major character in Steve Englehart's series of Max August novels, beginning with The Point Man in 1980, and continuing through The Long Man and The Plain Man.

In the hit video strategy game, Command and Conquer: Red Alert 2 as well as its expansion, Yuri's Revenge, the main character of Yuri was heavily influenced in the likeness of Wolf Messing.

== See also ==
- List of occultists
