= Balakirev the Jester =

- Written by: Grigori Gorin
- Directed by: Mark Zakharov
- Starring: Oleg Yankovsky; Aleksandr Zbruyev; Nikolai Karachentsov
- Music by: Sergei Rudnytsky
- Country of origin: Russia
- Original language: Russian

Production
- Producers: Felix Kleiman; Vladimir Dostal
- Cinematography: Eugene Guslinsky; Vladimir Fostenko; Alexey Naydenov; July Olshvang
- Running time: 162 minutes
- Production company: Lenkom Theatre

Original release
- Release: 2002

Balakirev The Jester (Russian: Шут Балакирев, romanized: Shut Balakirev) is a 2002 Russian televised version of 1999 Lenkom theatrical presentation, written by Grigori Gorin. The theatrical version directed by Mark Zakharov. The televised version was directed by Nikolay Skuybin.

== Plot ==
The plot is based on the stories of the court jester of Peter the Great, Ivan Balakirev Balakirev is a regular participant of the Tzar's festivities and buffoonery. Under the will of the circumstances he was drawn into the intricate relations inside the court and inside the royal family...

== Cast ==
- Oleg Yankovsky, Aleksandr Lazarev, Junior as Peter The Great
- Sergei Frolov as Ivan Balakirev
- Aleksandra Zakharova, Maria Mironova as Catherine I of Russia
- Aleksandr Lazarev Jr. as Willem Mons
- Aleksandr Zbruyev as Count Yaguzhinskii, chief prosecutor
- Nikolai Karachentsov, Viktor Rakov as Alexander Menshikov
- Olesya Zheleznyak as Dunya Burykina
- Yuri Kolychev as Peter Shafirov
- Tatyana Kravchenko as Anisya Kirillovna Balakireva
- Lyudmila Artemyeva as Darya Burykina
- Lyudmila Porgina as Golovkina, chamber-maid
- Igor Fokin as Shapsky, chief jester
