= Sergei Frolov (actor) =

Russian actor

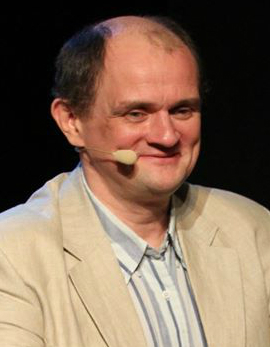
- Born: Sergei Alexandrovich Frolov; June 29, 1974 (age 52); Moscow, RSFSR, USSR
- Education: GITIS
- Occupation: Actor
- Years active: 1999–present
- Height: 1.76 m (5 ft 9 in)

Sergei (Note: Sometimes transcribed to English as Sergey) Alexandrovich (Note: Sometimes transcribed to English as Aleksandrovich) Frolov (Russian: Сергей Александрович Фролов; born June 29, 1974, in Moscow) is a Russian stage, television, and film actor, laureate of the State Prize of the Russian Federation (2003).

== Career ==
Graduated from the music school at the Moscow Conservatory (1991) and acting and directing department of GITIS (1999; Mark Zakharov's course).

He made his debut on the theater stage in Lenkom and worked in this theater for nine years.

He has been acting in films since 1999. In 2004/05 he was a TV presenter on the Ren TV channel.

== Selected filmography ==
List of film credits
Year	Title	Role	Notes
2000	True Incidents, or Crazy Fitter's Day	curious man	(ru)
2002	Balakirev the Buffoon	Ivan Balakirev	
2002	The Kopeck	painter	
2002	Tycoon	saxophonist	
2003	Distant Lights	Dmitry	
2003	The Key of Bedroom	cab man	(ru)
2004	Moths Games	Kaban	
2004	Farewell in June	man in a trolleybus	
2008	Plus One	Gomyra	
2011	Yolki 2	policeman	
2013	Judas	Thomas the Apostle	
2021	Doctor Lisa	Yakov	
2024	The Master and Margarita	skeptical viewer	

List of television credits
Year	Title	Role	Notes
2002	Azazel	janitor at the university	
2007	Daddy's Daughters	psychologist Zubchinskiy	
2013	Pyotr Leschenko. Everything That Was...	Georges Ypsilanti, head of Pyotr Leshchenko's orchestra	
2013	Ashes	Skryabin	(ru)
2022	Rectification and Punishment	Shnyr	(ru)
