= Semyon Farada =

Soviet and Russian stage and film actor

Semyon Farada PAR
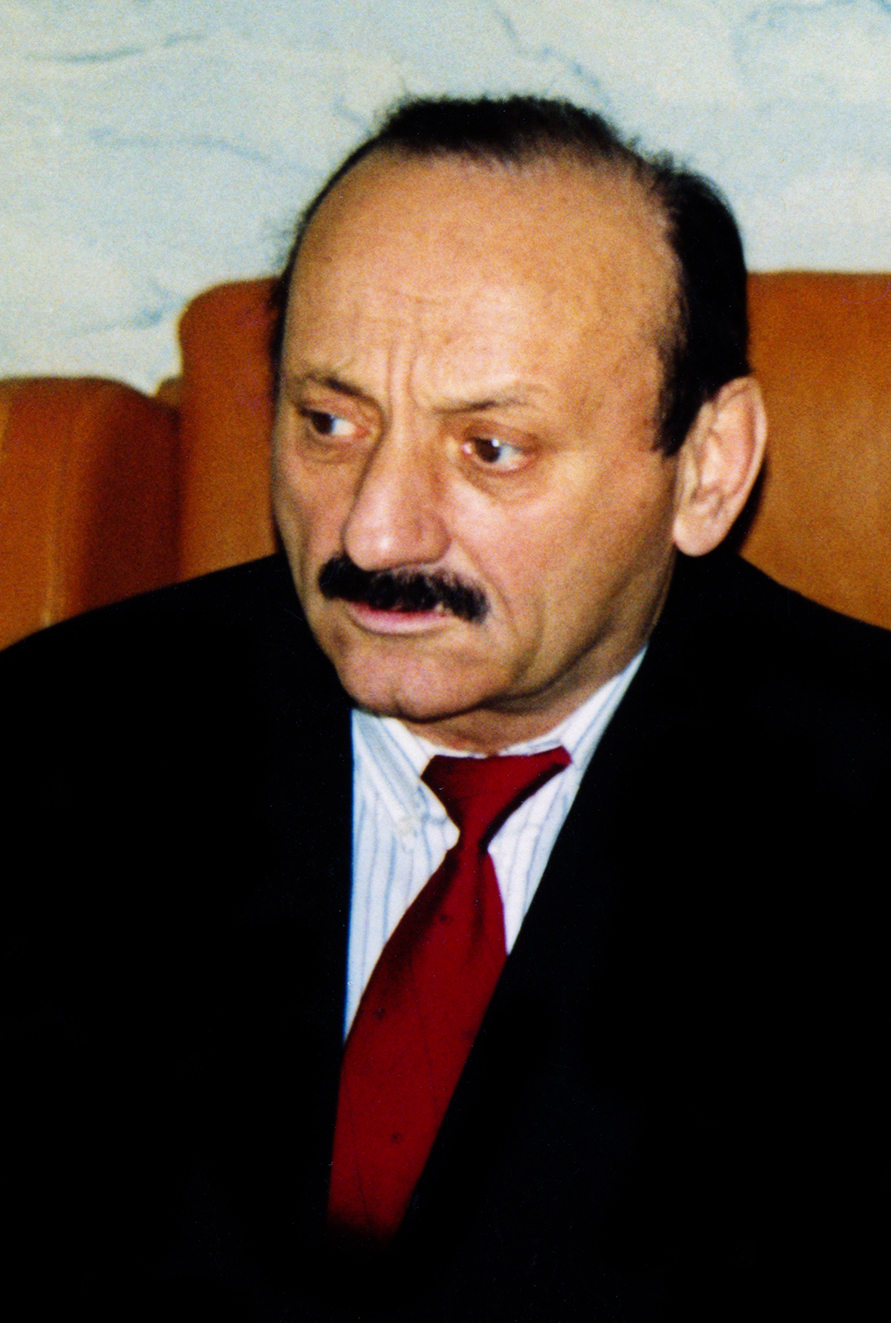
- Born: Semyon Lyvovich Ferdman; December 31, 1933; Nikolskoye, Moscow Oblast, RSFSR, USSR
- Died: August 20, 2009 (aged 75); Moscow, Russia
- Occupation: Actor
- Years active: 1968—2000
- Spouse: Maria Politseymako
- Children: 1
- Awards: People's Artist of Russia (1999)

Semyon Lvovich Ferdman PAR, better known by his stage name Semyon Farada (Russian: Семён Львович Фердман, Семён Фарада, December 31, 1933, Nikolskoye village of Moscow Oblast, USSR – August 20, 2009, in Moscow) was a Soviet and Russian stage and film actor.

== Early life ==
Ferdman was born into the Jewish family of army officer Lev Ferdman and pharmacist Ida Shuman. His father died when Semyon was 14. Later he tried to pursue a military career but failed the physical test at the Tank Forces School. He applied to Bauman Moscow State Technical University (then MVTU) and barely passed the exams; after three years in the classes he was drafted into the Baltic Fleet where he served for four years. The navy noticed Ferdman's artistic talent and assigned him to the Garrison Theatre in Baltiysk. There, while playing the part of a long-haired anarchist on stage, he was the only Baltic Fleet sailor allowed to wear long hair.

== Career ==
The navy provided Ferdman with recommendations to Moscow theatre directors, but he obeyed his mother's will and completed his courses at Bauman University, graduating in 1962. He worked as a mechanical engineer until 1969, and played as an amateur with Mark Rozovsky company based at Moscow University. Ferdman first appeared on screen in 1967. His stage name Farada was a nickname that emerged in one of his early filming tours of Central Asia. A studio manager refused to insert a Jewish surname, Ferdman, into film credits, and when Ferdman pressed him to "just invent some charade" (Russian: шарада, sharada), found nothing better than Sharada Farada. Farada stuck with the actor.

In 1972, after authorities shut down the Rozovsky theatre, Yury Lyubimov recruited Farada to work at the Taganka Theatre with whom he remained until his death. Farada played in more than 70 films, notably with directors Mark Zakharov, Eldar Ryazanov and Aleksey German.

A stroke in June 2000 after the funeral of his friend, playwright Grigory Gorin, forced Farada to retire from acting. He was married to actress Maria Politseymako and was father of actor Mikhail Politseymako, who both supported him in his final years.

== Selected filmography ==
Acting

- The Very Same Munchhausen (Тот самый Мюнхгаузен, 1979) as Commander-in-Chief
- The Garage (Гараж, 1980) as Trombonist
- Charodey (Чародеи, 1982) as Guest from South
- The House That Swift Built (Дом, который построил Свифт, 1982) as Governor
- Formula of Love (Формула любви, 1984) as Margadon
- After the Rain, on Thursday (После дождичка в четверг, 1985) as Shah Babadur
- How to Become Happy (Как стать счастливым, 1986) as Kolobok
- Gardemarines ahead! (Гардемарины, вперёд!, 1988) as director of Moscow School of Mathematics and Navigation
- Private Detective, or Operation Cooperation (Частный детектив, или Операция «Кооперация», 1989) as Mafioso

Voice acting

- Entrance to the Labyrinth (Вход в лабиринт, 1989) as Pontyaga
- Adventures of Captain Vrungel (Приключения капитана Врунгеля, 1989) as Giulico Banditto
