= Formula of Love =

Formula of Love (Формула любви)
- Directed by: Mark Zakharov
- Written by: Grigori Gorin (screenplay); Aleksey Tolstoy (story)
- Produced by: Aleksandra Demidova
- Starring: Nodar Mgaloblishvili; Aleksandr Abdulov; Semyon Farada; Tatyana Pelttser
- Cinematography: Vladimir Nakhabtsev
- Edited by: Valentina Kulagina (ed.); Viktor Yushin (production design)
- Music by: Gennady Gladkov (score); Yuli Kim (lyrics); Yuri Rabinovich (sound)
- Distributed by: Mosfilm; T/O Ekran
- Release date: December 30, 1984
- Running time: 90 minutes
- Country: Soviet Union
- Language: Russian

Formula of Love (Russian: Формула любви, romanized: Formula lyubvi) is a 1984 Soviet romantic fantasy comedy film directed by Mark Zakharov, from a screenplay by Grigori Gorin. It is loosely based on the story "Count Cagliostro" by Aleksey Tolstoy.

== Plot ==
In 1780, after a short fraudulent tour in St. Petersburg, the famous adventurer, "magician" and "master of secret forces" Count Cagliostro was forced to hide from the chase sent by the almighty Prince Potemkin. At the same time, Cagliostro is trying to find the "formula" for the only feeling that he is still unable to evoke in human hearts — love.

A young landowner Alexey Fedyashev lives in the Russian countryside near Smolensk. He cannot find a chosen one and secretly dreams of an unattainable ideal. Alexey is in love with the statue standing in the garden park, and dreams of reviving it — "as the Greek gods once breathed life into the stone Galatea." Having accidentally learned that Cagliostro is located near his estate, Alexey finds the count and asks for help.

The visit of foreign guests causes a stir in the quiet estate.

== Cast ==
- Nodar Mgaloblishvili as Count Giuseppe Cagliostro (voiced by Armen Dzhigarkhanyan)
- Yelena Valyushkina as Maria Ivanovna
- Aleksandr Mikhailov as Aleksei Alekseyevich Fedyashev
- Yelena Aminova as Lorenza
- Aleksandr Abdulov as Jacob
- Semyon Farada as Margadon (singing voice by Gennady Gladkov)
- Tatyana Pelttser as Fedosya Ivanovna
- Aleksandra Zakharova as Fimka
- Leonid Bronevoy as Doctor
- Nikolay Skorobogatov as Stepan Stepanovich

== Filming ==
Grigory Gorin saw Oleg Yankovsky in the role of Cagliostro, but the artist refused — he did not want to get involved with mysticism. "Praskovya Tulupova" is a marble copy of the statue "Odalisque (Sulamitide)" by the Italian sculptor Pasquale Romanelli.

The film was shot in the Moscow region, Stupinsky District and Domodedovsky District. According to Yelena Valyushkina, "It was a wonderful, fun time."

The film crew presented the announcement of the new film in the New Year's edition of Kinopanorama in 1984.

== Soundtrack ==
Формула любви (музыка из кинофильма)

Soundtrack album by VA
- Released: 2018
- Length: 53:27
- Label: Apple Music

External videos
- Fortune (Gold)

All lyrics are written by Yuli Kim; all music is composed by Gennady Gladkov.

No.	Title	Artist	Length
1.	"Начало" (Beginning)
2.	"Фортуна (Золото)" (Fortune (Gold))
3.	"Спиритический сеанс" (A Seance)
4.	"Мария" (Maria)
5.	"Тема Калиостро" (Cagliostro's Theme)
6.	"Калиостро увозит Марию" (Cagliostro Takes Maria Away)
7.	"Романс Алёши" (Alesha's Romance)	Aleksandr Mikhailov
8.	"Купание Алёши (Болезнь)" (Alyosha's Bathing (Disease))
9.	"Алёша едет к Калиостро" (Alyosha Goes to Cagliostro)
10.	"Неаполитанская песня" (The Neapolitan Song)	Alexander Abdulov, Semyon Farada, Gennady Gladkov
11.	"Болото" (Swamp)
12.	"Калиостро едет к Алёше" (Cagliostro Goes to Alyosha)
13.	"Выступление" (Performance)
14.	"Материализация чувственный идей" (Materialization of Sensual Ideas)
15.	"Колдовство Калиостро" (The Witchcraft of Cagliostro)
16.	"Оживление статуи" (Reviving the Statue)
17.	"Дуэль (Болезнь Калиостро)" (Duel (Cagliostro's disease))
18.	"Тема влюблённого" (Lover's Theme)
19.	"Финал" (The Final)
20.	"Титры" (Credits)
21.	"Уно моменто" (Uno momento)	Alexander Abdulov, Semyon Farada, Gennady Gladkov

== Legacy ==
"Formula of Love" is spoken of as one of the Soviet "quote films". In particular, the "Neapolitan Song" became very popular. The music and words of this pseudo-Italian aria were composed by Gennady Gladkov. According to Alexander Abdulov, he received letters asking him to send notes and lyrics of this "abracadabra", including from some military units.

== Awards ==
- 1985 — Prize for Best Director to Mark Zakharov at the XI WCF of Television Films in Moscow
