= The Very Same Munchhausen =

- Tot samyy Myunkhgauzen
- Based on: The character Baron Munchausen created by Rudolf Erich Raspe
- Written by: Grigoriy Gorin
- Directed by: Mark Zakharov
- Starring: Oleg Yankovskiy; Inna Churikova; Yelena Koreneva; Igor Kvasha; Aleksandr Abdulov; Leonid Yarmolnik; Leonid Bronevoy
- Music by: Alexey Rybnikov
- Country of origin: Soviet Union
- Original language: Russian

Production
- Cinematography: Vladimir Nakhabtsev
- Editor: Irma Tsekavaya
- Running time: 142 minutes
- Production companies: Gosteleradio USSR; Mosfilm

Original release
- Release: 1 January 1980

The Very Same Munchhausen (Russian: Тот самый Мюнхгаузен, romanized: Tot samyy Myunkhgauzen, alt. translation - That Very Münchhausen) is a 1980 Soviet fantasy comedy-drama television film directed by Mark Zakharov, based on a script by Grigoriy Gorin.

The film relays the story of the baron's life after the adventures portrayed in the Baron Munchausen stories, particularly his struggle to prove himself sane. Münchhausen is portrayed as a multi-dimensional, colourful, non-conformist man living in a grey, plain, dull and conformist society that ultimately tries to destroy his personality.

The film, created during late years of the Leonid Brezhnev rule, has been widely regarded as a tongue-in-cheek satire of the Soviet Stagnation-Era society.

== Plot ==
The film is set in Germany in 1779.

=== First part ===
Baron Münchhausen is perceived by others as a fabricator living in a world of fantasy. However, his stories have a strange tendency to become reality. Hunters at a camp are laughing at the story which Baron Münchhausen is telling about him hunting a deer and shooting it with a cherry pit, but suddenly they see a noble animal with a cherry tree in place of horns appear from the woods. The Baron says proudly that he became famous not for his exploits but for the fact that he never lies. He really cannot lie and is sickened by the idea of lying for personal benefit or "out of politeness".

Münchhausen lives in a castle with a charming girl called Martha. They have long thought about getting married, but there is an obstacle: the Baron already has a wife. In his youth his parents arranged his marriage with Jacobine von Dunten for purely practical reasons. She lives alone with her adult son Theophilus, while Münchhausen is seeking a divorce. Only the Duke can give permission but Jacobine and her lover Heinrich Ramkopf firmly inhibit this.

Relatives are trying to declare Münchhausen insane to gain the right to dispose of his property. He tries all alternatives but all the priests he talks to refuse to conduct a marriage ceremony for the couple. One happy day, the Duke, irritable after a quarrel with the Duchess, signs Münchhausen's application for divorce with the words "Absolve all of them, absolve them." Martha is happy but she is very afraid that her beau will throw another joke at the court hearing which must approve the divorce.

And so it happens that in signing the divorce papers, Münchhausen writes the "date" as May 32 as according to his calculations there is an error in the calendar and that this year should have one additional day. But nobody cares for his ideas and astronomical observations, and everyone sees his actions as just another defiant act against public order. The court, finding itself insulted, refuses to approve the divorce. A renunciation is required from the Baron: he must recognize that all of his stories are empty fantasies, he must write that he gives up everything that he said and wrote in written form, point by point. Friends, servants, Martha, all persuade Baron to comply.

Martha's statement becomes the last straw. She puts an ultimatum to the Baron: he must choose between his stories about encounters with William Shakespeare and Isaac Newton and her. Baron gives up: he signes a self-renunciation and the same evening burns all his manuscripts and leaves the room with a gun. A gunshot is heard.

=== Second part ===
Three years pass after the officially established death of Baron Münchhausen. From a living troublemaker, Baron transforms into a dead celebrity. Jakobina publishes a book called "Adventures of the Baron". This is not just compiled memories of Baron; instead they are embellished and supplemented by outright fabrications. Ramkopf leads excursions to the Baron's castle and outputs a scientific substantiation of the possibility of lifting oneself by hair. Theophilus unsuccessfully tries to repeat his exploits: lift oneself up into the air by one's hair and beat ducks through a chimney. People are singing in restaurants and painting pictures of Münchhausen. He is proclaimed as a "great man, misunderstood by his contemporaries", and on May 32 (the third anniversary of his death) a monument to the Baron is erected on the main square of the city.

A former servant of the baron, Thomas (one of the few who supported the Baron through thick and thin) goes to Müller's flower shop and recognizes his former master in the florist. It turns out that the suicide and the subsequent funeral was staged; after the funeral the Baron left everything to the official heirs and became a florist with the name Müller. Thus he was able to marry Martha and live with her.

But everyday life has greatly changed the Baron: from being a jovial dreamer he has turned into a sullen and thrifty cynic ("My funeral brought me more money than all my previous life.") Eventually, Martha leaves him because she cannot cope with the metamorphosis of her lover. He decides to get Martha back and understands that "to get her back, you need to bring yourself back". But for the city's people the dead baron has transformed into a legend, and in living form is not needed by anyone but Martha and Thomas.

Once the baron tells the people who are privy to his secret about his decision "to resurrect", the mayor who once was a close friend of the Baron declares him an impostor "for the sake of public safety" and sends him to prison "to determine his true identity". The court called to establish the identity of the Baron goes on in the tone of a well-organized play: one after the other of his former acquaintances, relatives and friends refuses to accept him. Only Martha at the last moment refuses to play the part prescribed to her and because of that the meeting ends up getting interrupted.

The last important trial is looming: The Baron is offered to accept that he is Müller or to repeat his flight to the Moon on a cannonball. "The investigative experiment" takes place on 32 May 1783 in a festive atmosphere, again according to plan. Martha, full of doubts, first reads out her request to the Duke to pardon her "abnormal husband Müller", but then cannot bear it any longer and admits this to her beloved: the cannon was filled with wet gunpowder so that the cannonball would fly for several meters and then during the sweeping laughter would fall to the grass so that the Baron's swindle would be considered proven.

A general commotion arises when the cannon is reloaded with the dry gunpowder brought by Thomas for public just wanted to laugh at the Baron, not to kill him. There are attempts to convince the Duke to make a decision that the Baron's identity has been verified and that his trip to the Moon has been a success. The Baron is offered to "return from the trip" in a blaze of glory. The previously scheduled "general merriment" begins almost unchanged, just in a different context, it becomes a celebration of his return.

As if nothing had happened Jakobina says that she has traveled to the Moon with the Baron, and is preparing to publish a memoir about it. A suggestion is whispered to the Baron: "Quickly join us." Munchausen while rushing from one company to another, seeing everywhere the same cheerful, overly-friendly faces and glasses raised for his journey, hearing appeals: "Join us, Baron", returns to the ramparts to the cannon and delivers the final monologue:

I understand what your trouble is: you're too serious! An intelligent face is not a sign of intelligence, gentlemen. All asininity on earth is made by people wearing this expression. Smile, gentlemen! Smile!

Baron gives orders for the day of his return and then begins to climb the rope ladder to the cannons vent. The angle changes and it turns out that the ladder has become very long, and no cannon is visible anymore - the Baron simply climbs the stairs up to the sky. The closing theme song plays.

== Cast ==
- Oleg Yankovskiy as Baron von Münchhausen
- Inna Churikova as Jacobine von Münchhausen
- Yelena Koreneva as Martha
- Igor Kvasha as Burgomaster
- Aleksandr Abdulov as Heinrich Ramkopf
- Leonid Yarmolnik as Theophil von Münchhausen
- Yuriy Katin-Yartsev as Thomas
- Vladimir Dolinskiy as Pastor
- Leonid Bronevoy as Duke of Hanover
- Igor Yasulovich as Duke Secretary
- Semyon Farada as Commander-in-Chief
- Vsevolod Larionov as Judge
- Lyubov Polishchuk as Bertha, songstress
- Grigoriy Gorin, cameo role during the town's celebrations.

== Production ==
=== Pre-production ===
The literary script was based on Grigori Gorin's play The most Truthful, which was a success in the Russian Army Theatre (with Vladimir Zeldin as Münchhausen). Mark Zakharov liked the show and decided to transpose it to the television screen. During the work on the script the play was seriously revised and greatly changed compared to the theatrical version. The music by Alexey Rybnikov was originally written for the play.

=== Casting ===
The core of the ensemble was created out of actors from the Lenkom Theatre. According to Zakharov, Oleg Yankovsky, following his role in Zakharov's previous film An Ordinary Miracle, was perfectly suited for the role of Baron Münchhausen. However, Zakharov had to convince the State Committee for Cinematography. Even Gorin remained unconvinced, he wanted Andrei Mironov. Yankovsky was identified with more heroic characters. In addition, the book and the play portrays the Baron as a middle-aged man who has an adult son. When the shooting started Yankovski just turned 35 years old. The outcome was that the director was able to defend his position.

I am grateful to Mark Zakharov for believing in me, he saw in me the atypical comedic talents, the ability to convey the sad irony of the character which I myself frankly did not suspect. Zakharov preferred to take a well-known actor and cast him against type. And for me it was really a godsend

— Oleg Yankovsky

Leonid Bronevoy adopted his role without issues. Yuri Vasilyev from the Moscow Satire Theatre initially auditioned for the role of Theophilus but Leonid Yarmolnik ended up getting the part. Some difficulties arose when casting the role of Martha. For the role, many actresses auditioned including Tatyana Dogileva and Irina Mazurkiewicz. After a long search, Yelena Koreneva was chosen by the State Committee.

=== Filming ===
The film was shot in the socialist East Germany (the real Münchhausen lived in the city Bodenwerder near Hanover, in the capitalist West Germany). It was much easier to arrange the film shooting in the GDR, so the location became the streets of Wernigerode which had an "authentic" look, and the city was hardly affected during World War II.

German actors and citizens took part in the crowd scenes and episodic roles. For instance, in the very first scene everyone except for Yankovski and Katin-Yartsev are Germans. This is visible in part because the German articulation does not match the Russian dubbing. Zakharov was not used to filming on location; he had trouble coordinating the German actors and shooting in stormy weather.

=== Censorship ===
Unlike other works by Zakharov, the film passed the censorship barriers relatively easily. Just one scene was cut, the one where hunters are studying the works of Münchhausen. The scene was considered too bold because the whole country at that time was studying the works of Leonid Brezhnev.

Later in the 1990s a dialogue between Münchhausen and the pastor was shortened. These particular lines were cut: "I read ... your book ... What kind of nonsense are you making up!". Baron replied: "I read yours - and it isn't any better." Pastor: "What?" The Baron, "the Bible".

== Reception ==
The fable takes the characteristic themes of romanticism; the conflict between the free creative imagination and the purely rational comprehension of the world, the tearing down of boundaries between dream and reality, the rejection of social conventions and the forcing the romantic hero into the harsh reality. The last point is reflected outwardly in the smugness and hypocrisy of the nobility and the bourgeoisie. Allusions in the language and in the actions (for example the finely coordinated show trial) show a brilliant satirical representation of Soviet society.

The film is one of the most popular comedies of the former USSR. and has become a source of many quotes for Russians.

Mark Zakharov won the award for Best Director and the Jury Prize at the International Television Festival Golden Prague (MTF Zlatá Praha) (1979).
