= Vladimir Nakhabtsev =

Soviet and Russian cinematographer (1938–2002)

Vladimir Dmitrievich Nakhabtsev (Russian: Владимир Дмитриевич Нахабцев; 16 July 1938, Korolyov, Moscow Oblast — 10 March 2002, Moscow) was a Soviet cinematographer and actor, renowned for his work with Eldar Ryazanov and Mark Zakharov.

== Selected filmography ==
- Give Me a Book of Complaints (1965); directed by Eldar Ryazanov
- Beware of the Car (1966); directed by Eldar Ryazanov
- Moscow, My Love (1974); directed by Alexander Mitta
- The Irony of Fate (1975); directed by Eldar Ryazanov
- Office Romance (1977); directed by Eldar Ryazanov
- The Garage (1979); directed by Eldar Ryazanov
- The Very Same Munchhausen (1979); directed by Mark Zakharov
- Say a Word for the Poor Hussar (1981); directed by Eldar Ryazanov
- Formula of Love (1984); directed by Mark Zakharov
- To Kill a Dragon (1988); directed by Mark Zakharov
- A Little Doll (1988); directed by Isaakas Fridbergas
