= Deja Vu (1990 film) =

Déjà Vu
- Directed by: Juliusz Machulski
- Written by: Alexander Borodyansky, Juliusz Machulski
- Starring: Jerzy Stuhr; Galina Petrova; Nikolai Karachentsov
- Narrated by: Vladimir Antonik
- Cinematography: Janusz Gauer
- Edited by: Miroslawa Garlicka
- Music by: Krzesimir Dębski
- Production companies: Odesa Film Studio; ZEBRA
- Release dates: 18 April 1990 (Poland); 1 July 1990 (USSR)
- Running time: 104 minutes
- Languages: Russian, English

Déjà Vu is a 1990 Soviet-Polish comedy thriller that takes place in Soviet Odesa in 1925 and spoofs a variety of gangster films.

== Plot ==
The plot takes place in 1925. One of Chicago mobsters Mik Nich (born as Mikita Nichiporuk) flees to Soviet Odessa to escape the revenge of other mobsters. Mob leaders send the best hit-man Johnny Polak to Odesa. The killer disguises himself as an American entomology professor who wants to visit the grave of his father in Odesa.

In search of his victim, Polak gets into the most unbelievable situations arising from the peculiarities of the city of Odesa, as well as from mad historical era. Being the first passenger of the ship voyage New York City-Odessa, he is assigned to be accompanied by the Komsomol guide Glushko and is besieged by pioneers and journalists. Jumping from the train and hitting his head, Polak forgets what he is actually doing there (retrograde amnesia) and tries to live up to his cover as an honest professor. Nichiporuk, in turn, learns about the arrival of the killer and is trying to kill him. Polak experiences several periods of regain and loss of memory (a periodical Déjà vu) while trying to track down Nichiporuk. Finally, Nichiporuk is arrested by Soviet authorities on an unrelated charge and sent to jail. Polak, having lost the rest of his sanity, ends up in a mental hospital.

== Cultural references ==
At one point, as Polak chases Nichiporuk through the city, both accidentally take part in the filming of the famous Odesa Steps sequence from Battleship Potemkin.

== Cast ==
- Jerzy Stuhr as Johnny Polak
- Galina Petrova as Klara Glushko
- Nikolai Karachentsov as Mishka Yaponchik (Mike the Little Jap)
- Vladimir Golovin as Mick Nich (Michail Nichiporuk)
- Liza Machulska as Aphrodite
- Jan Machulski as Don Big Jim Cimino
- Viktor Stepanov as Kryvonoshenko
- Oleg Shklovsky as George (Sr. Lt. Perepletchikov)
- Vasili Mishchenko as Kostya
- Vladimir Belousov as correspondent
- Vsevolod Safonov as Professor Babochkin
- Gennadi Vengerov as Petrovich
- Vitali Shapovalov hotel doorman (voiced by Yuri Sarantsev)
- Wojciech Wysocki as Franco de Niro
- Armen Khostikyan as Ashot Polakyan
- Murad Janibekyan as Aram Polakyan
- Nina Ter-Osipyan as old Armenian woman
- Anatoliy Kotenyov as Vladimir Mayakovsky
- Cezary Pazura as German cyclist
- Lyudmila Porgina as hotel attendant
