= Nikolai Karachentsov =

Soviet-Russian stage and film actor, singer and musician

- Николай Караченцов
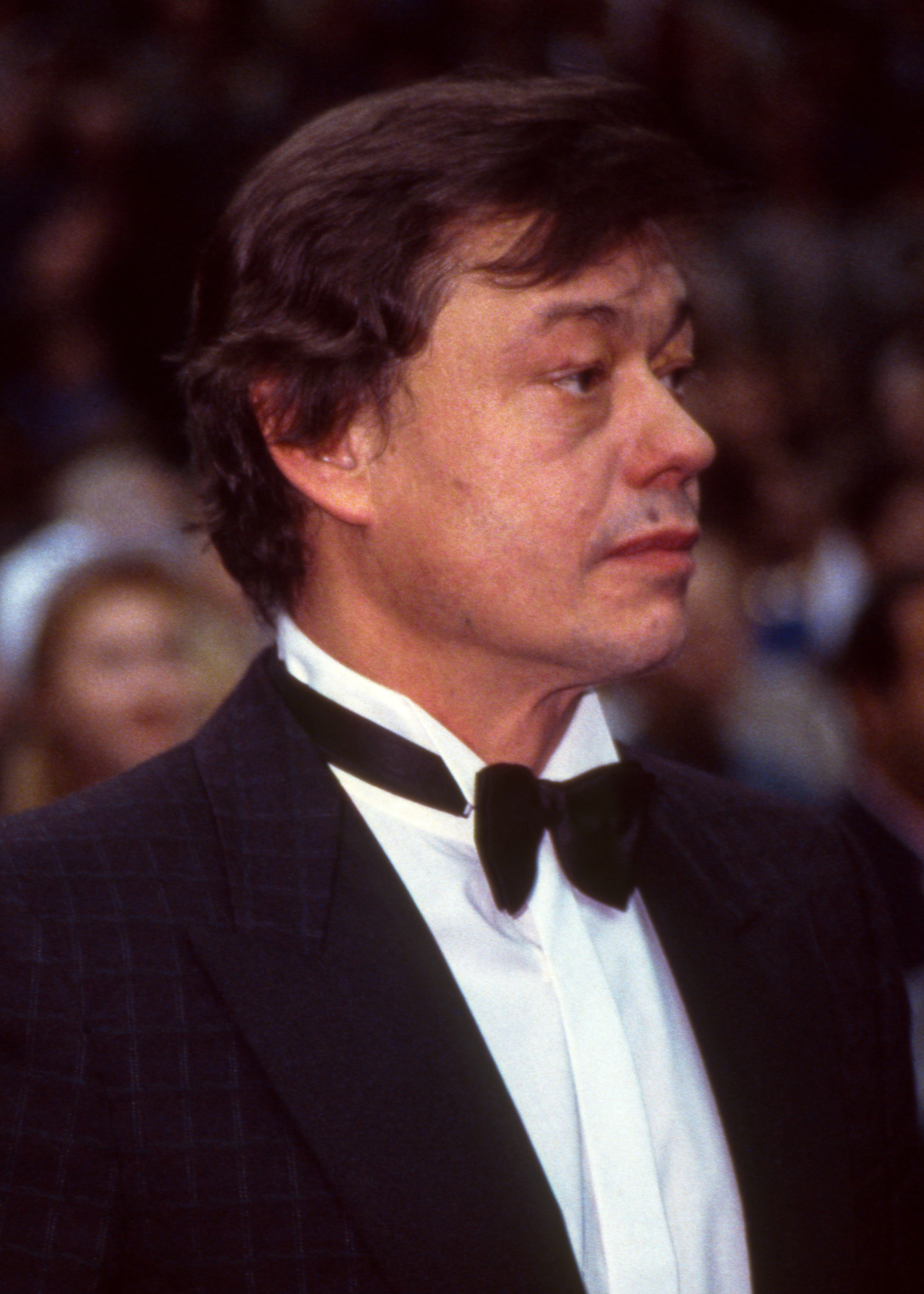
- Karachentsov in 1994
- Born: 27 October 1944; Moscow, Russian SFSR, USSR
- Died: 26 October 2018 (aged 73); Moscow, Russia
- Education: Moscow Art Theatre School
- Occupation: Stage and film actor
- Years active: 1967–2005, 2014
- Spouse: Lyudmila Porgina
- Awards: People's Artist of the RSFSR; State Prize of the Russian Federation; Order of Honour; Order "For Merit to the Fatherland"

Nikolai Petrovich Karachentsov (Russian: Николай Петрович Караченцов, 27 October 1944 – 26 October 2018) was a Soviet and Russian film and stage actor of Lenkom Theatre. Karachentsov's popularity peaked in the late 1970s and early 1980s among the Soviet youth after he had starred in rock operas. In 1989 he was awarded the title of People's Artist of the RSFSR. In 2003 he received the State Prize of the Russian Federation. He was also awarded the Order of Honour and Order "For Merit to the Fatherland", 4th class.

== Biography ==
=== Early life ===
Nikolai Karachentsov was born in Moscow on 27 October 1944. His father, Pyotr Yakovlevich Karachentsov (1907–1998), worked for many years in the magazine Ogoniok as a graphic artist, he received the title of Meritorious Artist of the RSFSR in 1967. Nikolai's mother, Yanina Brunak (1913–1992), was a choreographer. She directed plays in major musical theaters, took part in staging performances at the Bolshoi Theatre, Kazan Musical Theater, Ulaanbaatar Music Theater in Mongolia, administered a ballet school and organized the First National Ensemble of Vietnam, worked in Syria and London.

Karachentsov's parents separated, so when Yanina Evgenyevna would leave Moscow for work, Kolya studied and lived in a boarding school. In school days, he spent all summer vacations in the recreation center of the All-Russian Theater Society in the village of Shylykovo, Kostroma Oblast. In his childhood, Karachentsov was actively engaged in swimming and by the age of 13 he became the champion of the USSR's central sport school in diving. He left his swimming lessons when, together with his mother, he moved to Ulaanbaatar for two years.

While studying in high school, Nikolai Karachentsov joined the "Active" group, created at the Central Children's Theater. The duties of "activists" included duty in the building of the theater and monitoring of the observance of order by schoolchildren. And at the same time, the attendants had the opportunity to see the performances. Soon, at the Center for Children's Art an amateur studio for schoolchildren was opened. Karachentsov was one of the first to apply. The directors of the studio were Pechnikov and Minkovskaya. In the Club of Arts at the theater Karachentsov attended a course of lectures for schoolchildren. The lecturers were famous directors and actors.

Nikolai Karachentsov's first role was in the play Figaro. By this time, he already planned to become an actor.

=== Theatre career ===
In 1963, Karachentsov entered the Moscow Art Theatre School (course of Viktor Monyukov), which he graduated with honors in 1967. His role in the student performances Snowstorm and Ivan Vasilyevich received a high professional assessment. Usually school graduates were automatically "distributed" to the Moscow Art Theater, but in 1967 at the Lenkom Theatre, in connection with the departure from the post of the main director Anatoly Efros, there was a catastrophic situation of shortage of actors, and Karachentsov among the top ten students joined this theater.

Among Karachentsov's first performances were the plays staged by Efros: 104 Pages About Love, My Poor Marat, The Movie is Being Shot, Fear and Despair in the Third Empire and Farewell to Arms!.

After Karachentsov's successful first experience in the play Autograd 21 (1973), Lenkom's director Mark Zakharov invited him for the main role of Till Eulenspiegel in his next play Till (1974). The play, based on the novel by Charles De Coster, was written by playwright Grigori Gorin, and the composer Gennady Gladkov composed the music for the production. Through Karachentsov's performance, the character of Till – a buffoon, bully and rebel – became a cult figure of the 1970s Soviet youth. From the theater's repertoire Till was filmed only in 1992.

The rock opera of the composer Alexey Rybnikov Stardom and Death of Joaquin Murieta (based on the poetic drama of Pablo Neruda), staged by Mark Zakharov in 1976, was also well received. In it, Karachentsov played two roles at once: the ranger and Death. This production was part of the theater's program until 1993.

The most famous theatrical work of Karachentsov is the role of Count Rezanov in the rock opera Juno and Avos, a play that became a calling card of Lenkom. The premiere was held on July 9, 1981 (music by Alexey Rybnikov, libretto by Andrei Voznesensky). Karachentsov took vocal lessons from the famous musician Pavel Smeyan, who played in Juno and Avos the role of the Principal Writer. In 1983, the show was recorded for television and the same year the famous French couturier Pierre Cardin introduced the Juno and Avos to the French audience at the Espace Cardin Theater in Paris, followed by a triumphant tour around the world: the performance was shown in the US, Germany, Netherlands and other countries. Karachentsov became one of the leading actors of Lenkom.

Other popular productions with his participation were Optimistic Tragedy, Dictatorship of Conscience, School for Emigrants, Sorry, Czech Photo. Among the last theatrical roles of the actor were prince Alexander Menshikov in Balakirev the Buffoon and Domenico Soriano in The City of Millionaires.

=== Film career ===
Nikolai Karachentsov began to act in cinema in 1967: the first films with his participation were Strokes to the Portrait of Vladimir Lenin, And Again May. But the actor began to play actively in film only after the triumph of Till. Mark Zakharov did not use him in his screen works, with the exception of small roles in the television films of The Twelve Chairs (1976) and The House That Swift Built (1982). Nevertheless, even at the beginning of his film career Karachentsov played one of his best known roles - Busygin in the film adaptation of Alexander Vampilov's play The Elder Son (1975).

In the second half of the 1970s, Karachentsov became one of the most filmed actors in the Soviet Union. Karachentsov always performed stunts in his films by himself. His popularity was enhanced by roles in such films as The Dog in the Manger, The Adventures of the Elektronic, The Trust That Went Bust, White Dew, A Man from the Boulevard des Capucines, A Bright Personality, Deja Vu and many others. In total the filmography of Nikolai Karachentsov includes more than 100 roles in the cinema.

He also worked on dubbing foreign films, for example he voiced in Russian the roles of French actor Jean-Paul Belmondo. In addition, he took part in voicing many cartoons and worked extensively on television and radio.

From the beginning of the 1990s Karachentsov for many years has been the chairman of the jury of the Andrei Mironov Actor's Song Festival. In 1991 he was elected secretary of the Union of Theatre Workers of the Russian Federation. He was also a member of the Russian Academy of Cinematographic Arts "NIKA". In 1994, together with his friend and stuntman Nikolai Astapov, Karachentsov opened the Nikolay Karachentsov School of Arts in Krasnoarmeysk.

== Personal life ==
In 1975 Karachentsov married Russian actress Lyudmila Porgina who gave birth to their son Andrey three years later.

One of Karachentsov's main hobbies was tennis. He became a recurrent participant in several tennis tournaments, including "Big Hats", "Marco-Garros", for the cup of the "Big Cap". In 1994, paired with TV presenter Boris Notkin, he was allowed to play with the first president of the Russian Federation Boris Yeltsin. Among the regular partners of Karachentsov were tennis player and coach Shamil Tarpishchev, vice-president of the Tennis Federation of the North-West region Igor Dzhelepov, composer Maksim Dunayevsky and poet Yury Ryashentsev.

Karachentsov was a member of the United Russia party.

== Injury, illness and death ==
On 28 February 2005, Karachentsov was driving his car, a Volkswagen Passat, to Moscow, on his way to his mother-in-law's funeral when he lost control of his vehicle and crashed into a street light pole, suffering a traumatic brain injury. His seat belt was not fastened. After twenty-six days in coma, he began regaining motor skills, finally being able to get up onto a stage in 2007. Despite some improvement, he never fully recovered after the accident, his speech and ability to walk remained severely impaired. His only cinema appearance after the crash was a minor role almost without words in the film White Dew: The Return in 2014.

In 2017 Karachentsov was diagnosed with lung cancer and underwent unsuccessful treatment in Israel.

On 26 October 2018 Karachentsov died from kidney failure in a Moscow clinic, one day before his 74th birthday.

== Selected filmography ==
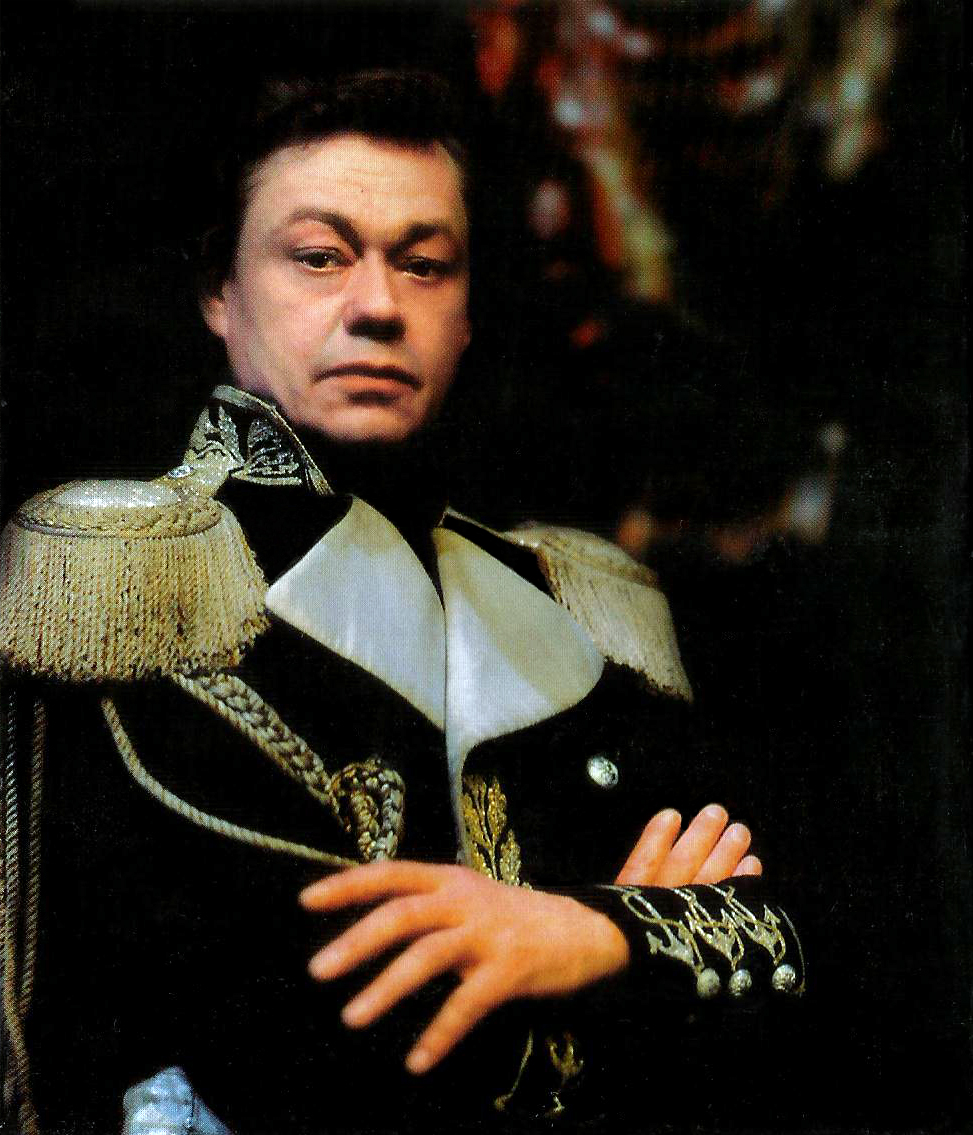
Karachentsov as Rezanov in Juno and Avos stage portrait.

Actor

- The Elder Son (Старший сын, 1976) as student Vladimir Busygin
- The Twelve Chairs (Двенадцать стульев, 1976) as actor in the theater "Columbus"
- The Dog in the Manger (Собака на сене, 1978) as Marquis of Ricardo
- Errors of Youth (Ошибки юности, 1978)
- The Adventures of the Electronic (Приключения Электроника, 1979) as Urrie
- Sherlock Holmes and Dr. Watson (Приключения Шерлока Холмса и доктора Ватсона. Кровавая надпись, 1979) as Jefferson Hope
- The House That Swift Built (Дом, который построил Свифт, 1982) as Flim, the Lilliputian
- Juno and Avos (Юнона и Авось) (rock opera also released as a TV film) as Nikolay Rezanov
- The Trust That Went Bust (Трест, который лопнул, 1983) as Jeff Peters
- White Dew (Белые росы, 1983) as Vasiliy
- How to Become Happy (Как стать счастливым, 1986) as Gosha
- A Man from the Boulevard des Capuchines (Человек с бульвара Капуцинов, 1987) as Billy King
- Moonzund (Моонзунд, 1987) as Von Knupfer
- Bright Personality (Светлая личность, 1988) as Egor Filyurin
- The Witches Cave (Подземелье ведьм, 1989) as Jean
- The Criminal Quartet (Криминальный квартет, 1989) as Marat
- Two Arrows. Stone Age Detective (Две стрелы. Детектив каменного века, 1989) as Fighting man
- Good Luck, Gentlemen (Удачи вам, господа!, 1992) as Vladimir

Voice

- The Hobbit: Treasures Under the Mountain (Хоббит. Сокровища под горой, 1991, not released) as Gandalf
- A Trap for Lonely Man (Ловушка для одинокого мужчины, 1990) as Wife-loser
- Dog in Boots (Пёс в сапогах, 1981) as Gascon Dog
- The Cat Who Walked by Herself (Кошка, которая гуляла сама по себе, 1988) as Hourse
