= A Bright Personality =

- Directed by: Aleksandr Pavlovskiy
- Written by: Igor Shevtsov, Aleksandr Pavlovskiy
- Starring: Nikolai Karachentsov; Aleksandra Yakovleva
- Music by: Maksim Dunayevsky
- Production company: Odessa Film Studio
- Release date: 1988
- Running time: 82 minutes
- Country: USSR
- Language: Russian

A Bright Personality or (Russian: Светлая личность, romanized: Svetlaya lichnost) is a 1988 fantastic satirical comedy based on the works of Ilf and Petrov, directed by Alexander Pavlovsky at the Odessa film studio. The film consists of two parts: the "Dark Past" and "Bright Future".

== Plot ==
In provincial Pischeslav (original name of the small town is Kukuyevo) there is a powerful and respectable organization named KLOOP. A job in KLOOP is a cherished dream of every inhabitant of Pischeslav, but for what purpose was this office created and what does it do in reality – is a mystery even to the KLOOP workers. In fact the KLOOP are a bunch of bureaucrats and penpushers who simply receive public money.

In KLOOP works Egor Filyurin whose neighbor in his communal apartment is a local celebrity – inventor Babsky. Most of his inventions are absurd and useless but when Babsky invents soap for removing freckles, something amazing happens. Having washed himself with this soap when taking a bath Filyurin becomes invisible! His ability to penetrate unnoticed by all institutions allows him very often to identify such tenacious evils as bureaucracy, arrogance, careerism, nepotism.

The leadership of KLOOP is very concerned with the current situation. Head of KLOOP Cain Dobroglasov using the "Time Machine" – another invention of the restless Babsky – prepares to travel into the future when he comes to the conclusion that in the present time he is to be removed from his post. But Filyurin's invisibility suddenly disappears, and life in the city of Pischeslav begins to flow in a quiet bureaucratic line once again...

== Cast ==
- Nikolai Karachentsov – Egor Karlovich Filyurin, KLOOP's clerk
- Aleksandra Yakovleva – Rita Haritullina, Filyurin's co-worker
- Mikhail Svetin – Ptashnikov, Filyurin's co-worker
- Galina Polskikh – Ptashnikova, Ptashnikov's wife and Filyurin's co-worker
- Andrey Ankudinov – Kostya Ptashnikov, Ptashnikov's son and Filyurin's co-worker
- Svetlana Kryuchkova – Segidilia Karpovna, head of KLOOP's trade union
- Boryslav Brondukov – head of KLOOP's personnel
- Victor Pavlov – Cain Alexandrovich Dobroglasov, head of KLOOP
- Vsevolod Shilovsky – Abel Alexandrovich Dobroglasov, deputy head of KLOOP, Cain's brother
- Abesalom Loria – Babsky, inventor
- Aleksandr Demyanenko – Spravchenko, doctor
- Igor Dmitriev – Bernardov, the former lead singer of the Imperial Opera
- Mikhail Kokshenov – Boris Abramovich Godunov, painter
- Viktor Ilichyov – Yusupov
- Vladimir Tatosov – cashier-accountant
- Sergey Migitsko – Mr. Pip, foreigner
- Veronika Izotova – Caina Dobroglasova, Cain's secretary, Abel's mistress
- Nikolay Slyozka – attendant
- Alla Budnitskaya – guide
- Armen Dzhigarkhanyan – narrator
