= The House That Swift Built =

1982 film by Mark Zakharov

- Directed by: Mark Zakharov
- Written by: Grigori Gorin
- Starring: Oleg Yankovsky; Aleksandr Abdulov; Vladimir Belousov; Yevgeny Leonov
- Cinematography: Lev Bunin
- Music by: Gennady Gladkov
- Production company: Studio Ekran
- Release date: 1982
- Running time: 138 minutes
- Country: Soviet Union
- Language: Russian

The House That Swift Built (Russian: Дом, который построил Свифт, romanized: Dom, kotoriy postroil Svift) is a 1982 Soviet fantasy comedy-drama film directed by Mark Zakharov based on the eponymous play by Grigori Gorin about Irish satirist writer and Anglican priest Jonathan Swift.

In 1745 Dublin, a weary Jonathan Swift confronts mortality and legacy as he encounters characters from his own writings, blurring the line between reality and fiction in his final days.

== Plot ==
The story begins on October 5, 1745, in Dublin, as Dr. Richard Simpson arrives at the home of Jonathan Swift, the dean of St. Patrick’s Cathedral and a renowned writer. A crowd has gathered, thinking Swift’s funeral is taking place, but he soon appears, repeating an annual ritual where he stages his own funeral and reads his will. Swift, who has been silent and keeps his eyes covered, is cared for by his housekeeper Vanessa and his servant Patrick. Inside the house, Dr. Simpson encounters characters from Swift’s books: three Lilliputians in a love triangle, a now-shrunken giant named Glum, and Mr. Nobody, who claims to be over a thousand years old. A theater troupe performs in Swift’s home, hoping to inherit it. Amid tensions, the police arrest the actors, Vanessa is dismissed, and her sister Esther, who loves Swift, replaces her as housekeeper. A guard named Jack begins to see his life as a time loop and attempts to free the actors, only to be killed by his partner, hoping his next life will be different.

Days later, the council, led by the Governor-General of Ireland, grows concerned as strange events continue around Swift's home, including the sighting of a celestial body resembling the island of Laputa. Dr. Simpson, frustrated by his inability to influence events, finally reads one of Swift’s books and recognizes himself as Dr. Lemuel Gulliver, Swift’s literary alter ego. A delegation of Laputians from the future arrives, announcing that Swift will die of a heart attack on October 19. Breaking his silence, Swift confirms his impending death and refuses to choose between Vanessa and Esther, stating both women hold a place in his heart. Swift steps through an open door, accompanied by the characters from his books, on what he calls his final “fifth journey” into the afterlife. Dr. Simpson remains, poised over a blank page, envisioning himself on a grand ship setting sail.

== Cast ==
- Oleg Yankovsky - Jonathan Swift
- Aleksandr Abdulov - Richard Simpson, Doctor
- Vladimir Belousov - Patrick, servant-secretary
- Yevgeny Leonov - Glum, the giant
- Marina Ignatova - Vanessa
- Alexandra Zakharova - Stella (Esther Johnson)
- Alexander Sirin - Mr. Someone, Struldbrugg
- Aleksandr Zbruyev - Relb, Lilliputian
- Nikolai Karachentsov - Flim, the Lilliputian
- Tatyana Rudina - Betty, wife of Relb
- Viktor Proskurin - Jack Smith, constable
- Yuri Astafiev - Constable
- Villor Kuznetsov - main Laputian
- Vsevolod Larionov - Bigs, the judge
- Semyon Farada - Governor
- Yuri Kolychev - Bishop
- Valery Belyakov - city dweller
- Vyacheslav Gorbunchikov - city dweller
- Evgeny Markov - participant of the meeting with the governor
- Vladimir Myshkin - city dweller
- Igor Fokin - spectator with binoculars
- Olegar Fedoro - Laputian
- Vladimir Fyodorov - dwarf with a gun (uncredited)
