= Good Luck, Gentlemen =

- Russian: Удачи вам, господа!
- Directed by: Vladimir Bortko
- Written by: Arkadiy Inin
- Starring: Nikolai Karachentsov; Andrejs Zagars; Darya Mikhaylova; Tatyana Agafonova; Vladimir Bortko
- Release date: 1992
- Running time: 95 minute
- Country: Russia
- Language: Russian

Good Luck, Gentlemen (Russian: Удачи вам, господа!) is a 1992 Russian comedy-drama film directed by Vladimir Bortko.

== Plot ==
Oleg goes to St. Petersburg with the hope of getting a good job and housing, but instead finds refuge in a forest in which former army captains majors live in tanks and his friend is engaged in private business. And suddenly they meet in provincial Olga, whom both fall in love with.

== Cast ==
- Nikolai Karachentsov as Vladimir
- Andrejs Zagars as Oleg (as Andrejs Zhagars)
- Darya Mikhaylova as Olga
- Tatyana Agafonova as Gipsy Masha
- Vladimir Bortko as The film director on shooting
- Boryslav Brondukov as Worker of a crematorium
- Semyon Furman as Businessman of shadow economy
- Yury Kuznetsov as Door-keeper
- Viktor Pavlov as Maksim Petrovich
- Yuriy Sherstnyov as Victor Ivanovich
