= Aleksandr Abdulov =

Soviet and Russian actor

- Александр Абдулов
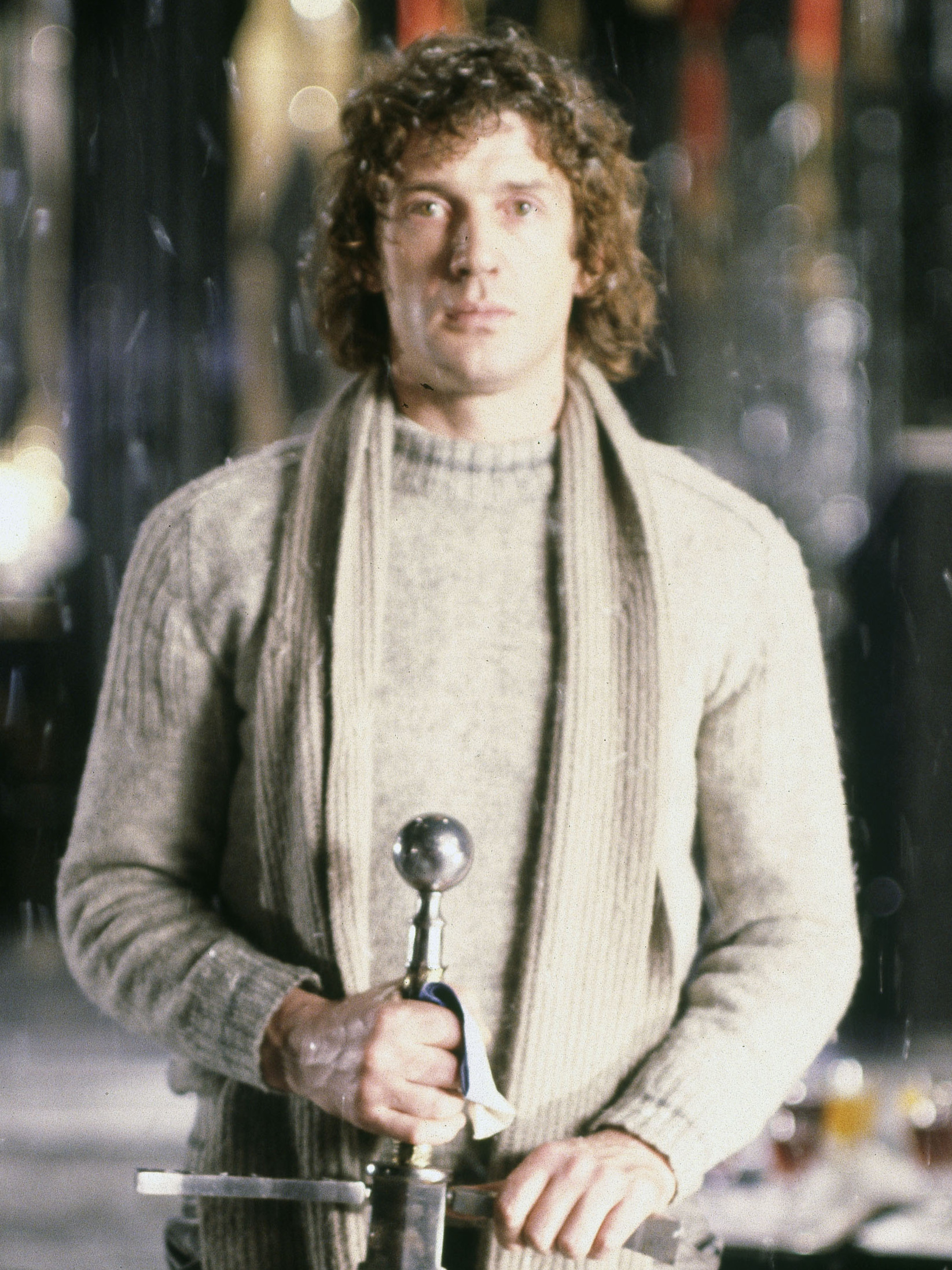
- Abdulov in 1988
- Born: Aleksandr Gavrilovich Abdulov; 29 May 1953; Tobolsk, Russian SFSR, Soviet Union
- Died: 3 January 2008 (aged 54); Moscow, Russia
- Resting place: Vagankovo Cemetery, Moscow
- Years active: 1974–2007
- Spouses: Irina Alfyorova; Julia Ignatenko
- Children: 2

Aleksandr Gavrilovich Abdulov (Russian: Алекса́ндр Гаври́лович Абду́лов; 29 May 1953 – 3 January 2008) was a Soviet and Russian film and stage actor, film director, screenwriter and television presenter. He was awarded People's Artist of the RSFSR in 1991.

== Biography ==
Aleksandr Abdulov went to school from 1960 to 1970, and upon graduation wanted to become a sportsman. However, Abdulov's father encouraged his son to act, and Aleksandr Abdulov starred in About Vitya, about Masha and the Sea Force, 1974. In 1975 he graduated from GITIS and was hired by Lenkom Theater director Mark Zakharov.

Aleksandr Abdulov appeared in several films in the 1970s. In 1977 he was in the TV version The Twelve Chairs, directed by Mark Zakharov. In 1978 he became a celebrity after his role in An Ordinary Miracle. In 1979 Abdulov appeared in The Meeting Place Cannot Be Changed with Vladimir Vysotskiy. That year he also had roles in Do not part with the Loved Ones and The Very Same Munchhausen.

During the early 1980s, he was considered a sex symbol. In 1982 he performed in Look for a Woman, Magicians and The Woman in White. In 1982, he was given a role in The House That Swift Built (a film about Jonathan Swift) as Dr. Simpson. In 1984 Abdulov was in The Formula of Love and, the following year, In Search for Captain Grant. He also performed in The Most Charming and Attractive and Naval Cadets, Charge!.

Aleksandr Abdulov then went on to play in Desyat Negrityat (based on Agatha Christie's mystery novel Ten Little Indians) in 1987 and To Kill a Dragon in 1988. The next year he had a role in Black Rose Is an Emblem of Sorrow, Red Rose Is an Emblem of Love.

Abdulov was in Genius, The House under the Starry Sky (both made in 1991) and "Gold" (1992). During the 1990s he mostly worked in the Lenkom Theatre. In 2000 he performed in Still Waters and The Christmas Miracle with Chulpan Khamatova. In 2002 he appeared in the TV series Next (the title is the actual English word), where he played a Russian oligarch. He reprised the role in the sequel "Next 2" (2003). The following year he was in About Love.

In 2005, Abdulov had roles in the TV series Anna Karenina and The Master and Margarita. In 2006, he directed the play One Flew Over the Cuckoo's Nest at the Lenkom and played the lead character of Randall P. McMurphy (played by Jack Nicholson in the American film). He also had an appearance in the film Attack on Leningrad.

== Attitude to the mass media ==
In the last years of his life, Abdulov had extremely tense relations with the mass media, especially the tabloids. He vehemently resented all false information about him and hated those unscrupulous journalists who tried to pry into his personal life. On Man and Law, aired on Russia's Channel One, Abdulov said once that he owned a licensed gun and he would not hesitate to shoot any trespasser who dared to enter the territory of his dacha during his forthcoming birthday party.

== Marriages ==
Aleksandr Abdulov was married three times. His first marriage was to Irina Alfyorova, by whom he had a stepdaughter, Ksenia Alfyorova. His second wife was Galina, a theatre administrator. In 2006 he married Julia Miloslavskaya, who gave birth to their daughter Eugenia in 2007.

== Health problems and death ==
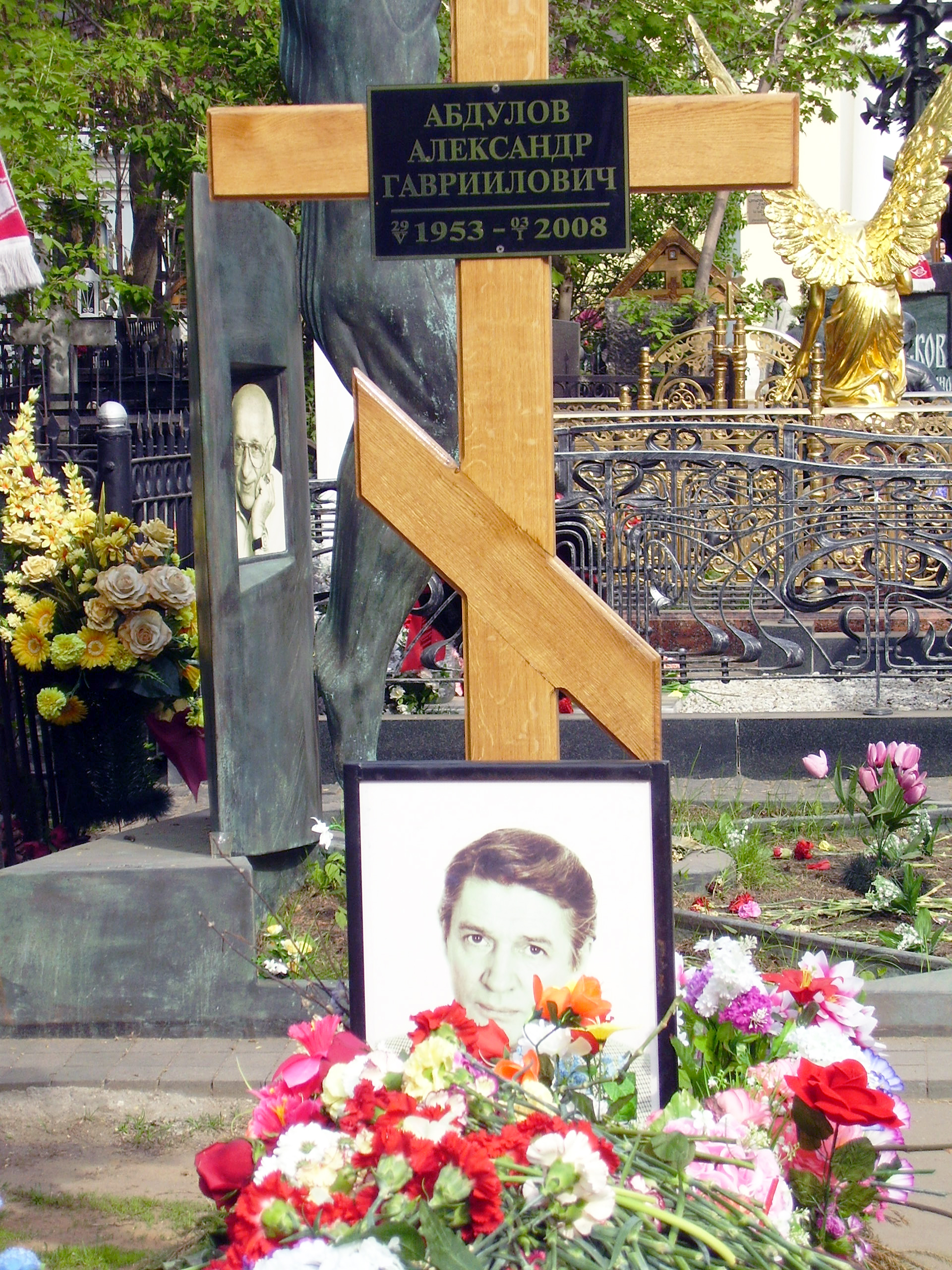
Abdulov's grave

Abdulov was a smoker throughout his adult life. In August 2007, the actor experienced health problems, supposedly an ulcer. However, in September of the same year he was diagnosed with lung cancer in an Israeli clinic.

He was last seen in public in mid-December 2007 at an awards ceremony at the Kremlin, where Vladimir Putin awarded the actor with the Order "For Merit to the Fatherland", 4th class.

He died on 3 January 2008, aged 54.

== Honors and awards ==
- Honored Artist of the RSFSR (1986)
- People's Artist of the RSFSR (1991)
- Order of Honour (1997)
- Order "For Merit to the Fatherland", 4th class (2007)

== Selected filmography ==
- 1974: Moscow, My Love (Russian: Москва, любовь моя) as boyfriend
- 1974: About Vitya, about Masha and the Marines (Про Витю, Машу и морскую пехоту) as paratrooper Kozlov
- 1975: The Lost Expedition (Пропавшая экспедиция) as Boris Rogov
- 1977: Golden River (Золотая речка) as Boris Rogov
- 1976: Twelve Chairs (Двенадцать стульев) as engineer Ernest Schukin
- 1977: An Ordinary Miracle (Обыкновенное чудо) (TV Mini-Series) as the Bear
- 1978: Front Beyond the Front Line as Soldier (uncredited)
- 1979: The Meeting Place Cannot Be Changed (Место встречи изменить нельзя) (TV Mini-Series) as driver for the gang
- 1979: The Very Same Munchhausen (Тот самый Мюнхгаузен) (TV Movie) as Heinrich Rammkopf
- 1980: Do Not Part with Your Beloved (С любимыми не расставайтесь) as Mitya Lavrov
- 1982: Carnival (Карнавал) as Nikita
- 1982: Premonition of Love (Предчувствие любви) as Sergey Vishnyakov
- 1982: The House That Swift Built (Дом, который построил Свифт) (TV Movie) as Richard Simpson, Doctor
- 1982: Charodei (Чародеи) (TV Movie) as Ivan Sergeevich Puhov
- 1983: Look for a Woman (Ищите женщину) (TV Movie) as Robert de Charans
- 1984: Formula of Love (Формула любви) as (TV Movie) Jacob
- 1985: The Most Charming and Attractive (Самая обаятельная и привлекательная) as Volodya Smirnov
- 1985: In Search for Captain Grant (В поисках капитана Гранта) as Bob the Tar
- 1986: Guard Me, My Talisman (Храни меня, мой талисман) as Anatoli Klimov
- 1987: And Then There Were None (Десять негритят) as Anthony Marston
- 1987: Tracker (Филёр) as Vanya
- 1988: Gardes-Marines, Ahead! (Гардемарины, вперёд!) as Count Vasily Lyadashchev
- 1988: To Kill a Dragon (Убить Дракона) as Lancelot
- 1989: Lady Macbeth of the Mtsensk District (Леди Макбет Мценского уезда) as Sergei
- 1990: Black Rose Is an Emblem of Sorrow, Red Rose Is an Emblem of Love (Чёрная роза — эмблема печали, красная роза — эмблема любви) as Vladimir
- 1991: Genius (Гений) as Sergey Nenashev
- 1991: Sons of Bitches (Сукины дети) as Igor Gordynsky
- 1991: Humiliated and Insulted (Униженные и оскорблённые) as Masloboev
- 1991: Caccia alla vedova as Prince Badritzky
- 1991: House under the Starry Sky (Дом под звёздным небом) as Zhora
- 1993: Prison Romance (Тюремный романс) as Artynov
- 1992: Over the Dark Water (Над тёмной водой) as Lev
- 1994: Nastya (Настя) as Teterin
- 1997: Schizophrenia (Шизофрения) as Ivan Golubchik
- 1999: Women's Property (Женская собственность) as Sazonov
- 2000: Still Waters (Тихие омуты) as academician Anton Kashtanov
- 2000: The Christmas Miracle (Рождественская мистерия) as the puppeteer
- 2001: Yellow Dwarf (Жёлтый карлик) as Vladimir Zharovsky
- 2005: The Master and Margarita (Мастер и Маргарита) (TV Mini-Series) as Koroviev
- 2005: The Case of "Dead Souls" (Дело о «Мёртвых душах») (TV Mini-Series) as Nozdryov
- 2006: The Funeral Party (Ниоткуда с любовью, или Весёлые похороны) as Alik
- 2007: Actress (Артистка) as Bosyakin
- 2009: Attack on Leningrad (Ленинград) as Chigasov
