= Schizophrenia (film) =

- 1997 VHS cover
- Russian: Шизофрения
- Directed by: Viktor Sergeyev
- Written by: Aleksandr Abdulov; Eugene Kozlovsky; Viktor Nevsky
- Produced by: Aleksandr Golutva; Igor Lavrik
- Starring: Aleksandr Abdulov; Aleksandr Zbruyev; Armen Dzhigarkhanyan; Nikolay Trofimov; Kirill Lavrov
- Cinematography: Yuriy Shaygardanov
- Edited by: Lyudmila Obrazumova
- Music by: Andrey Makarevich
- Production company: Lenfilm
- Release date: July 28, 1997
- Running time: 147 min.
- Country: Russia
- Language: Russian

Schizophrenia (Russian: Шизофрения, romanized: Shizofreniya) is a 1997 Russian crime film directed by Viktor Sergeyev.

== Plot ==
The film tells about the connections of the criminal part of Russia with the government.

== Cast ==
- Aleksandr Abdulov as Ivan Golubchik
- Aleksandr Zbruyev as Aleksandr Viktorovich
- Armen Dzhigarkhanyan as shooting instructor
- Nikolay Trofimov as Nikolay Nikolaevich
- Kirill Lavrov as Oleg Petrovich Kolobov (prototype Oleg Lobov)
- Natalya Antonova as Natalya
- Yury Kuznetsov as Walter
- Leonid Bronevoy as tailor
- Viktor Stepanov as Nikolay Yurievich
- Boris Klyuyev as banker Lozovsky (prototype Boris Berezovsky)
- Leonid Nevedomsky as Vladimir Ivanovich, FSB General
- Georgy Martirosyan as the shot general
- Sergey Stepanchenko as Ensign Kravchuk
- Vladimir Ermilov as episode
- Yuri Galtsev as trucker rapist
- Nikolay Smorchkov as police sergeant
- Nikita Mikhalkov as cameo
