= The Twelve Chairs (1976 film) =

Soviet musical film

- Based on: The Twelve Chairs by Ilf and Petrov
- Written by: Mark Zakharov; Evgeny Schwartz
- Directed by: Mark Zakharov
- Starring: Andrei Mironov; Georgy Vitsin; Anatoli Papanov; Aleksandr Abdulov; Tatyana Pelttser; Lidiya Fedoseyeva-Shukshina
- Composer: Gennady Gladkov
- Country of origin: Soviet Union
- Original language: Russian

Production
- Cinematography: Vladimir Osherov; Georgi Rerberg; Dmitri Surensky
- Editors: T. Aksyonova; Nina Osipova

Original release
- Release: 1976

External videos
- Cruel Tango ("Жестокое танго"); Ostap Bender in search of another chair.

The Twelve Chairs (Russian: 12 стульев) is a 1976 four-episode musical television film directed by Mark Zakharov based on the 1928 novel of the same name by Ilf and Petrov.

It is the second full-length adaptation of the novel in the Soviet Union (the first was directed by Leonid Gaidai) and is the sixth one in the world.

== Plot ==
The film takes place in 1927 from April to October in the Soviet cities of Stargorod, Moscow, Vasyuki, Pyatigorsk, Vladikavkaz, Tbilisi, and Yalta.

The quiet life of registrar Ippolit Matveyevich Vorobyaninov is rocked by the sudden death of his mother-in-law, Claudia Ivanovna, who admits that she sewed her diamonds into the seat of one of the twelve chairs belonging to their former living room set in order to hide it from Soviet forces, who had been confiscating treasures from everyone.

Vorobyaninov decides to track down the treasure. Before he can begin his quest, Ippolit Matveyevich meets a young swindler named Ostap Bender who coerces him into agreeing to help in the search in exchange for a percentage of the profit. Unfortunately, the town priest Father Fyodor also learns of Claudia Ivanovna's secret as part of her confession and decides to find the chair himself. Bender dreams of using the profits to move to Rio de Janeiro, which he believes to be the greatest place in the world.

The companions go on the hunt for the chairs across the whole country, encountering many unique and interesting characters, and competing against each other along the way. In the end, they find eleven out of the twelve chairs and return to Moscow without finding the treasure. Somehow, Bender manages to track down the last missing chair and informs Ippolit Matveyevich, whom he has taken to calling Kisa, about this before he goes to sleep. Because they have inspected all the other chairs and found nothing, both know that the treasure is hidden in this last chair. Kisa decides to seize the treasure for himself and kills the sleeping Ostap by cutting his throat with a straight razor. However, Vorobyaninov fails to retrieve the treasure because the Railroad Club caretaker had accidentally discovered the diamonds in the chair and "Comrade Krasilnikov", the club's manager, has already built a new club with the money.

== Cast ==
- Andrei Mironov as Ostap Bender
- Anatoli Papanov as Vorobyaninov
- Georgy Vitsin as Bezenchuk
- Rolan Bykov as Father Fyodor
- Aleksandr Abdulov as engineer Schukin
- Tatyana Pelttser as Madame Petukhova
- Lidiya Fedoseyeva-Shukshina as Madame Gritsatsuyeva
- Lyubov Polishchuk as dancer
- Mark Zakharov
- Vsevolod Larionov as Absalom Iznuryonkov
- Vera Orlova as Yelena Stanislavovna Bour
- Eduard Abalov

== Filming ==
We were not going to show a completely realistic Bender, there was a need for a purely emotional, not ideological and semantic memory of our former fascination with the former "Twelve Chairs". Gladkov's witty music, consisting of melodies that were remembered once and for all, surprisingly elegant, ironic poems by Kim... I don't know who Yuliy Kim meant - Andrei Mironov or Ostap Bender, when he composed one of his piercing foxtrots: "Oh, the pleasure of sliding along the edge! Freeze, angels, look – I'm acting.". I didn't compete with traditional cinema. And as a result, I made a kind of literary and musical review with large text blockades, entirely extracted from the original source.

— Mark Zakharov

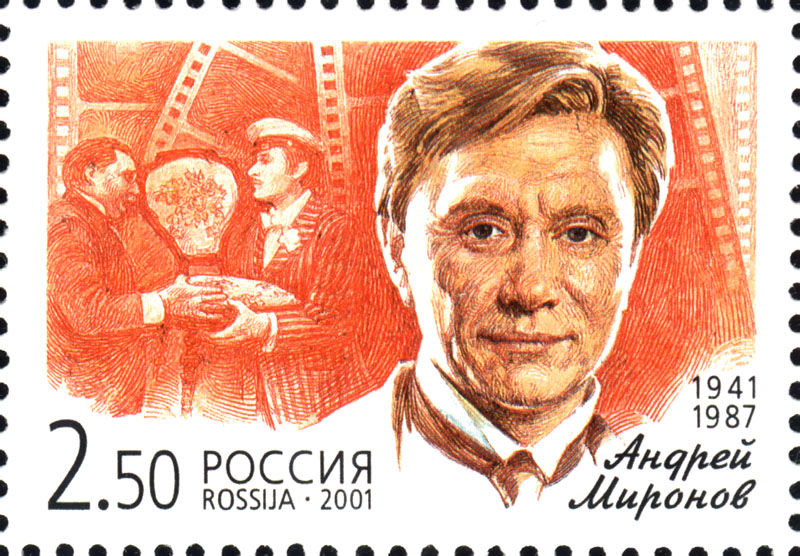
Russian postage stamp in 2001, depicting Mironov and his role as Ostap

In the scene of the meeting of the "Union of Sword and Plowshare", according to the director's idea, a talking parrot had to be present. The trainer introduced his pet as "the smartest and most talking parrot", but the bird did not speak after a minute or half an hour. "Well, apparently he's not in the mood to talk today. But now he will definitely show you how contagiously he can laugh," the trainer did not give up and began to laugh, looking expectantly at the bird. The parrot, in response, still stared intently at his master, continuing to be silent. The director, losing patience, gave the command to start shooting, and to voice the parrot in postproduction. But at the words "Camera, motor!" the parrot immediately started up and began to laugh contagiously.

== Themes and analysis ==
The Twelve Chairs, much like its source material, is a social critique of society, opining on themes such as religion, culture, economic policy, morality and the transformation of Russia under early communism. Vorobianinov represents the old guard of Russians of the Russian Empire, while Bender himself is the epitome of the new Russian people under the rule of the Communist Party of the Soviet Union.

According to Alexander Melman (MK), Zakharov's Bender is "a disappointed intellectual to the core, a sad clown in the highest sense of the word" and all the director's theatrical and film works contain a lot of personal: "70-80's, stagnation, you say? And he took the paint of everyday life and painted, composed together with the much-needed Grisha Gorin, brightened up the gray day. These were the happiest creative years. And after all, everyone understood: the Soviet people were complex, irresistible, smart in hindsight, and whatever, so they read all these Zakharov's allusions, hints, maxims at once.".
