= Yuliy Kim =

Russian bard (born 1936)

Yuliy Chersanovich Kim
- Юлий Черсанович Ким
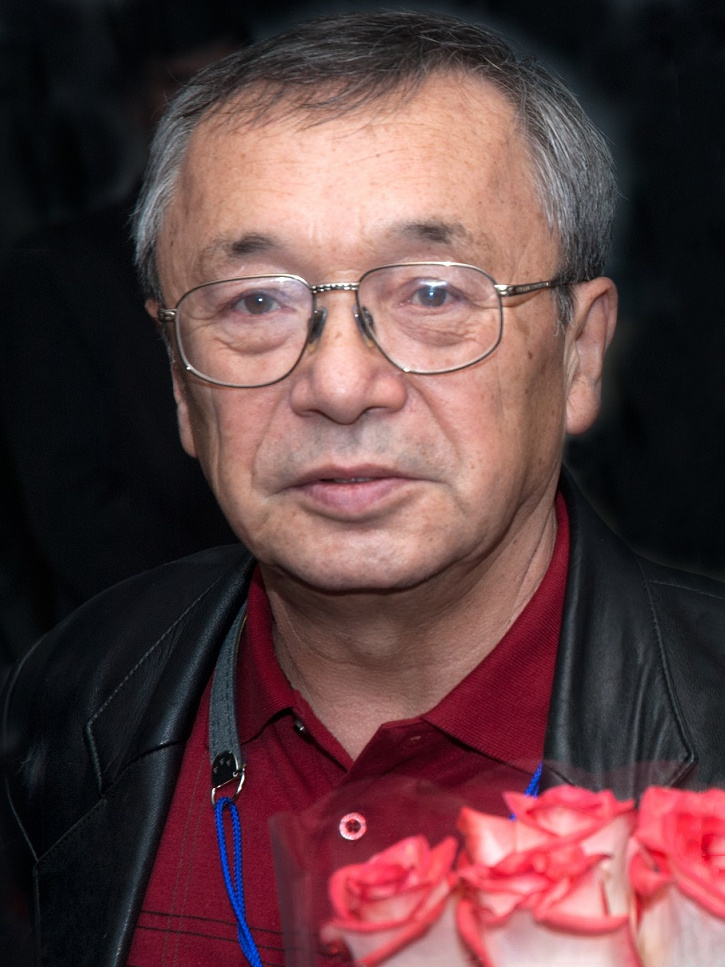
- Kim in 2006
- Born: December 23, 1936 (age 89); Moscow, Soviet Union
- Citizenship: Soviet Union (1936–1991) → Russia (1991–present), Israel (1998–present)
- Education: Moscow State Pedagogical University
- Occupations: poet, singer-songwriter
- Known for: his songs and human rights activism
- Movement: dissident movement in the Soviet Union
- Parent(s): Kim Chersan and Nina Valentinovna Vsesvyatskaya
- Awards: Medal Defender of a Free Russia

Yuliy Chersanovich Kim (Russian: Юлий Черсанович Ким, Korean: 율리 킴; born 23 December 1936, Moscow) is a Russian bard, composer, poet, and songwriter. His songs, encompassing everything from mild humor to biting political satire, appear in dozens of Soviet movies, including Bumbarash, The Twelve Chairs, and An Ordinary Miracle, as well as the songs "The Brave Captain," "The Black Sea," "The Whale-Fish," "Cursed Lips," "Captain Bering," and "Baron Germont Went to War." Since 1998, he has been living in Israel and has made periodic tours throughout Russia, Europe, and the United States.

== Biography ==
Kim was born in 1936 in Moscow to Kim Cheol San (김철산 / 1904–1938), a journalist of Korean descent, and Nina Valentinovna Vsesvyatskaya (1907-1974), a teacher of Russian language and literature whose grandfather, Vasiliy Vsesvyatskiy, was a protoiereus of the Russian Orthodox Church in the Ugodsko-Zavodsky Uezd of the Kaluga Governorate who baptized Georgy Zhukov.

Kim's parents were victims of the Great Purge of 1937 and 1938, in which his father was executed and his mother was sentenced as a "family member of a traitor of the Motherland" to five years in a labor camp and three years of exile, so that Kim didn't see her until age 9. She was rehabilitated during the Khrushchev Thaw period in 1958, but before that, she was under the "101st kilometer" law and could not live in Moscow, so Kim's family settled in Maloyaroslavets, Kaluga Oblast. In 1951, the family moved to Turkmenistan. Kim returned to Moscow in 1954 to enter the Moscow State Pedagogical Institute.

In 1959, Kim graduated from the Department of History and Philology of Moscow State Pedagogical University. During his student years, he began writing poems and setting some of them to music. Upon graduation, he was sent to teach in the village of Il'pyrsky, Kamchatka, near Anapka, where he taught for three years. He taught history, literature, geography, and other subjects, and also directed a number of musical plays with the schoolchildren. Since then, the sea has become one of the main themes of his songs.

In 1969, he signed An Appeal to The UN Committee for Human Rights.

After returning to Moscow, Kim worked as a school teacher, and at the same time participated in the Soviet dissident movement, which cost him his job in 1968. Subsequently, Kim earned a living by writing songs for plays and movies as well as publishing plays under the pseudonym Yu. Mikhailov, which he used until 1986. At the same time, while he was barred from giving concerts, he continued his singing underground.

With the advent of glasnost, Kim was finally able to perform legally. Since the breakup of the Soviet Union, he has been acclaimed throughout the Russian-speaking world and has performed in numerous locations in Russia, Europe, and the United States. He has received numerous awards, such as the Bulat Okudzhava Prize of the Russian Federation.

Today, Yuliy Kim's discography includes over 20 titles on CD, audio and video tape, and DVD. His songs have been included in almost all anthologies of author's song as well as many anthologies of modern Russian poetry.

His first wife was Irina Yakir — granddaughter of Red Army commander Iona Yakir. They married in 1966, and in 1998 they immigrated to Israel. After Irina's death in 1999, Kim married Lidia Lugovaya, Irina's close friend since school days. He currently splits his time between Jerusalem and Moscow.

== Selected filmography ==
Year	Film	Original name	Contribution
1963	Newton Street, House 1	Улица Ньютона, дом 1	Lyrics, vocal, actor (uncredited)
1969	By the Lake	У озера	Lyrics
1971	Bumbarash	Бумбараш	Lyrics
1976	The Twelve Chairs	12 стульев	Lyrics
1977	About Red Riding Hood	Про Красную Шапочку	Lyrics
1978	Cabbages and Kings	Короли и капуста	Lyrics, vocal
1978	Five Evenings	Пять вечеров	Lyrics
1978	An Ordinary Miracle	Обыкновенное чудо	Lyrics
1979	Very Blue Beard	Очень синяя борода	Lyrics
1982	The Story of Voyages	Сказка странствий	Lyrics
1982	Along Unknown Paths	Там, на неведомых дорожках...	Lyrics
1984	Pippi Longstocking	Пеппи Длинныйчулок	Lyrics, vocal
1984	Formula of Love	Формула любви	Lyrics
1984	Make the Clown Laugh	Рассмешите клоуна	Lyrics, vocal
1985	After the Rain, on Thursday	После дождичка в четверг	Screenplay, lyrics, actor (uncredited)
1987	A Man from the Boulevard des Capucines	Человек с бульвара Капуцинов	Lyrics
1988	One, Two — Grief Is No Tragedy!	Раз, два — горе не беда!	Screenplay, lyrics, actor
1988	Heart of a Dog	Собачье сердце	Lyrics
1991	Shadow	Тень, или Может быть, всё обойдётся	Lyrics
2002	The Unwilling Doctor	Лекарь поневоле	Music, lyrics and vocal
2010	The Ugly Duckling	Гадкий утёнок	Lyrics
