= Golden River (film) =

1976 Soviet adventure film

- Russian: Золотая речка
- Directed by: Venyamin Dorman
- Written by: Isai Kuznetsov
- Starring: Boris Smorchkov; Aleksandr Abdulov; Aleksandr Kaydanovskiy; Viktor Sergachyov; Yevgeniya Simonova
- Cinematography: Anatoly Buravchikov; Vadim Kornilyev
- Edited by: Galina Shatrova
- Music by: Mikael Tariverdiev
- Release date: 1976
- Country: Soviet Union
- Language: Russian

Golden River (Russian: Золотая речка) is a 1976 Soviet adventure film directed by Venyamin Dorman.

== Plot ==
The film takes place in 1923. The characters again find themselves in places where a large gold deposit was discovered, but getting it harder than before.

== Cast ==
- Boris Smorchkov as Aleksey Kumanin
- Aleksandr Abdulov as Boris Rogov
- Aleksandr Kaydanovskiy as Kirill Zimin
- Viktor Sergachyov as Yefim Subbota
- Yevgeniya Simonova as Tasya Smelkova
- Sergey Sazontev as Fedyakin
- Nikolay Olyalin as Silantiy
- Andrey Kharybin as Temka
- Vadim Zakharchenko as Khariton
- Nikolay Gorlov
