= Leonid Bronevoy =

Soviet and Russian actor (1928–2017)

- Леонид Броневой
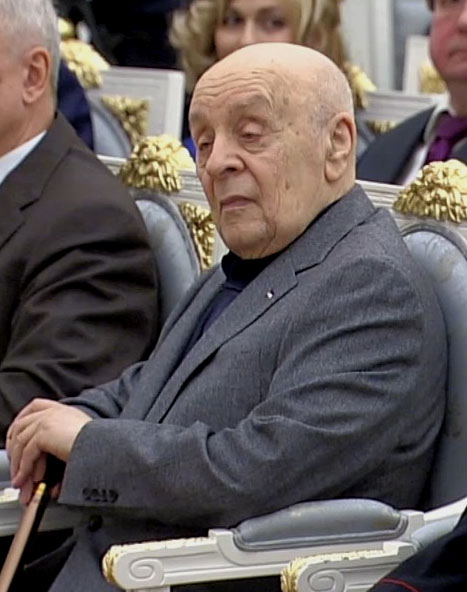
- Bronevoy in 2014
- Born: Leonid Solomonovich Bronevoy; December 17, 1928; Kiev, Ukrainian SSR, Soviet Union
- Died: December 9, 2017 (aged 88); Moscow, Russia Russian (1991–2017)
- Occupation: Actor
- Years active: 1950–2017

Leonid Sergeyevich Bronevoy (Note: Russian: Леонид Сергеевич Броневой, romanized: Leonid Sergeyevich Bronevoy) (December 17, 1928 – December 9, 2017, born Leonid Solomonovich Bronevoy) (Note: Russian: Леонид Соломонович Броневой, romanized: Leonid Solomonovich Bronevoy) was a Soviet and Russian actor. Though primarily a stage actor in the Lenkom Theatre, Bronevoy also made occasional appearances in films. He was named People's Artist of the USSR in 1987 and won the Nika Award in March 2008.

== Early life ==
Bronevoy was born in Kyiv on December 17, 1928, into the Jewish family of Solomon Iosifovich Bronevoy (who changed his family name from Faktorovich) and Bella Lvovna Bronevaya. In his childhood, he learned to play violin under the instruction of Kyiv Conservatory professor David Solomonovich Berthier.

His father, Solomon Bronevoy, came from the family of a confectioner from Odessa and had participated in the Russian Civil War. From 1920 to 1923, he worked at the State Political Directorate and completed his legal education in Kyiv, where he met Bella Bronevaya, a student in the economics department. Solomon Bronevoy worked at the Institute of National Economy until his dismissal on Trotskyism charges. In 1928, before the birth of his son, Solomon got a job in the Kyiv District economic department of the Prosecutor General's Office, with the help of his elder brother Alexander Iosifovich Bronevoy. Later, Solomon Iosifovich was sent to Ivanovo. In 1933, he was awarded the Order of the Red Star, and in 1934, he was appointed director of the sixth Department in the USSR's People's Commissariat for Internal Affairs (NKVD). In 1935, he was dismissed from the NKVD and was appointed chief of Kyiv's "culture and park recreation."

On September 13, 1936, Solomon was arrested, and on March 9, 1937, he was sentenced to five years in prison (after the extension of the term, he was released in 1946). Solomon's wife divorced him and changed their son's patronym to "Sergeyevich", but that did not help. As a "family of an enemy of the people", she and her son Leonid were sent into exile in Malmyzh.

In 1941, the family was allowed to return to Kyiv, but due to World War II, they were evacuated to the city of Chimkent, Kazakh SSR, where Leonid Bronevoy attended high school and began to work independently.

== Acting career ==
In 1950, Leonid graduated from the Alexander Ostrovsky Tashkent Theatrical Art Institute. After his graduation in 1950, he worked in Magnitogorsk and Orenburg drama theatres.

In 1953, Leonid went to Moscow, where he was able to immediately enter the third year of the Moscow Art Theater School (class of A.M. Karev) and successfully completed it in 1955. After completing theatre school, Leonid left Moscow and was admitted into the Grozny Drama Theatre. He acted at the Irkutsk Okhlopkov Drama Theater, and Voronezh Koltsov Academic Drama Theater.

From 1962 to 1988, he was the leading actor in the Moscow Drama Theatre on Malaya Bronnaya. Starting in 1988, he performed in Moscow at the Lenkom Theatre.

Bronevoy achieved star status in the USSR after playing the role of Heinrich Müller in the TV series Seventeen Moments of Spring. Despite lacking a physical resemblance to the historical chief of the Gestapo, his portrayal became iconic due to his natural charisma and sense of humor.

Bronevoy's equally popular characters include the role of the Doctor in the comedy Formula of Love and that of the Duke of Hanover in The Very Same Munchhausen.

Bronevoy subsequently played more than 20 roles in films. The last was the role of an old actor in Simple Things, for which he received the Nika Award in March 2008.

His name appeared on a petition against the Russian annexation of Crimea. However, he told TASS that his name was placed without his permission, adding that he supported Vladimir Putin and Russian actions in Crimea.

He died at his home on 9 December 2017, at age 88.

== Partial filmography ==
- Comrade Arseny (1964) as Gendarme colonel
- Lebedev vs Lebedev (1965) as Yevgeny Viktorovich
- Your Contemporary (1967) as Minister secretary
- Investigation Held by ZnaToKi (1971—1972, TV Series) as Kudrjashov, restaurant director
- Acting As... (1973) as Tugodayev
- Seventeen Moments of Spring (1973, TV Mini-Series) as Heinrich Müller
- Just Several Words In Honour Of Mr. de Molière (1973, TV Movie) as Louis XIV
- 'A' For the Summer (1974) as Stepan Petrovich, cook, speaking in verse
- Tanya (1974, TV Movie) as Semyon Semyonovich Vasin
- Concerto for Two Violins (1975) as professor Leonid Medvedev
- Olga Sergeyevna (1975) as Tyutyaev
- Request to Speak (1975) as Petr Altukhov, former chairman
- Mayakovsky Laughs or Bedbug-75 (1976) as Oleg Bayan
- I Want the Floor (1976) as Pyotr Vasilyevich Antukhov
- Armed and Very Dangerous (1977) as Peter Dumphy
- Savoy Hijacking (1979) as Jean Challot
- The Very Same Munchhausen (1979) as Duke
- We Aren't So Old! (1980) as Mikhail Ostashenko
- Agony (1981) as Ivan Manasevich-Manuilov
- Return Of Resident (1982) as Johann Staube
- Pokrovsky Gates (1982, TV Movie) as Arkady Velyurov
- If to Believe Lopotukhin (1983) as Yuri Leonidovich, the headmaster / humanoid
- A Month in the Country (1983) as Ignatius Ilyich Sрhpigelsky
- Formula of Love (1984) as Doctor
- Chicherin (1986) as Maxim Litvinov
- Final of the Resident Mission (1986) as Johann Staube
- Mysteriuous Inheritor (1987) as Civil law notary
- Big Game (1988) as Vernier
- The Physicists (1989) as Newton
- Promised Heaven (1991) as Colonel Semen Yefremovich
- Old Young People (1992) as Viktor Maksimovich, deputy
- Italian Contract (1993) as Don Lucino
- Equals to four France (1996, TV Series) as Shakhmatov
- Schizophrenia (1997) as sartor
- Ship of Doubles (1997) as general of FSB
- Simple Things (2007) as Vladimir Mikhailovich Zhuravlev
- Guilty Without Fault (2008) as Mendelsson

=== Voice in animation ===
- Plasticine Crow (1981) as Grandpa
- Investigation Held by Kolobki (1986-1987) as Boss (in parts 1 and 2)

== Honours and awards ==
- Honored Artist of the RSFSR (1971)
- People's Artist of the RSFSR (1979)
- People's Artist of the USSR (1987)
- People's Artist of Ukraine (2013)
- Order of the Red Banner of Labour (1982)
- Order "For Merit to the Fatherland";
  - 1st class (13 September 2013)
  - 2nd class (1 December 2008, the award ceremony was held on December 17) for outstanding contributions to the development of domestic theatrical and cinematic arts, many years of creative activity
  - 3rd class (17 December 2003) for outstanding contribution to the development of national art
  - 4th class (25 August 1997) a great contribution to the development of theatrical arts
- State Prize of the Russian Federation in Literature and Art in 1996 (29 May 1997)
- Vasilyev Brothers State Prize of the RSFSR (1976) for his role of Heinrich Müller in the television series Seventeen Moments of Spring
