= Mark Zakharov =

Soviet and Russian stage and film director (1933–2019)

- Марк Захаров
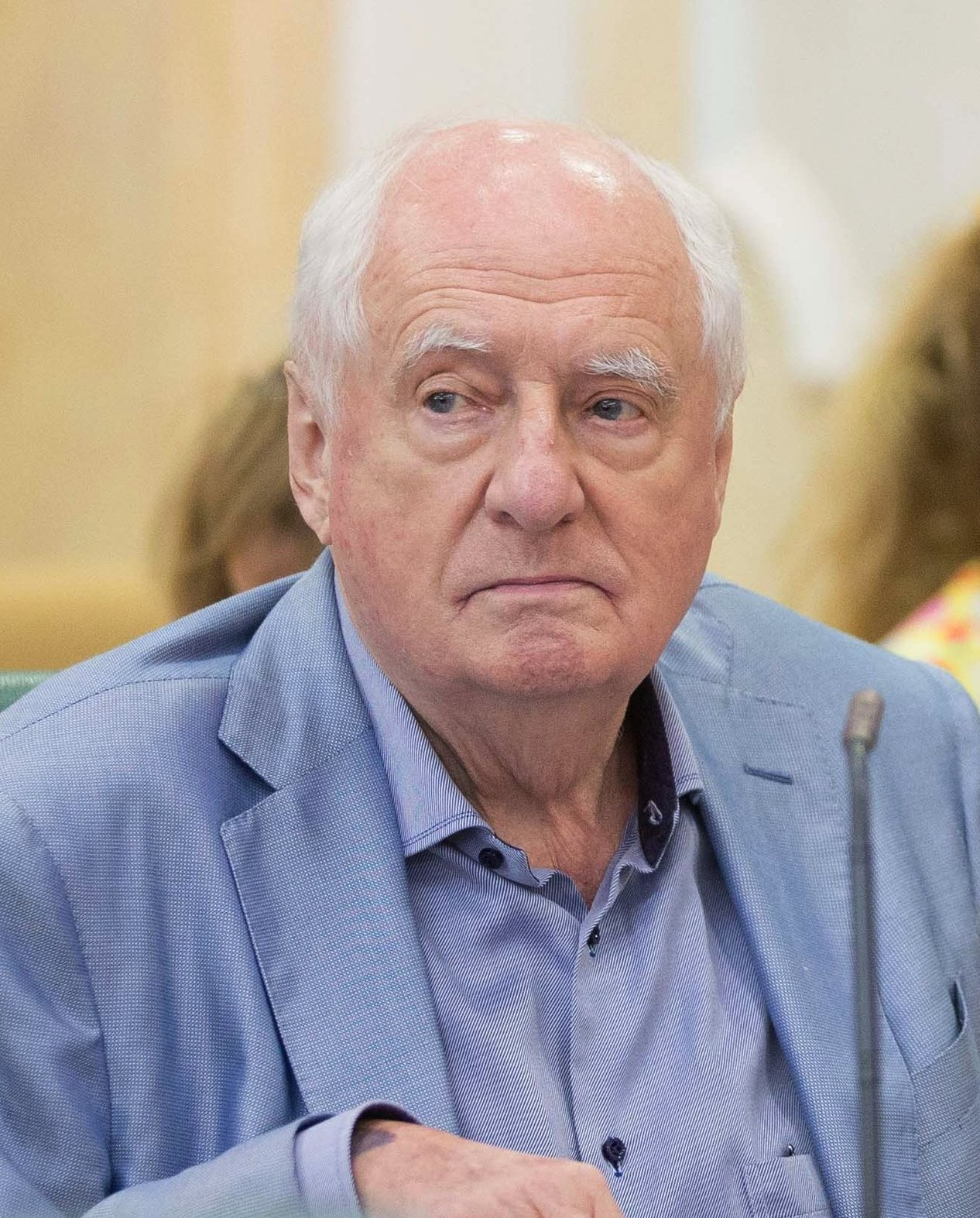
- Zakharov in 2014
- Born: Mark Anatolyevich Shirinkin; 13 October 1933; Moscow, Russian SFSR, Soviet Union
- Died: 28 September 2019 (aged 85); Moscow, Russia
- Citizenship: Russia
- Education: Russian Institute of Theatre Arts
- Occupations: theatre director, film director
- Years active: 1955—2019
- Title: People's Artist of the USSR (1991)
- Spouse: Nina Lapshinova
- Awards: Full cavalier of the Order "For Merit to the Fatherland"; Order of Friendship of Peoples; State Prize of the Russian Federation ×3; USSR State Prize

Mark Anatolyevich Zakharov (Russian: Марк Анатольевич Захаров; 13 October 1933 – 28 September 2019) was a Soviet and Russian stage and film director, screenwriter and pedagogue best known for his fantasy parable movies. He was named People's Artist of the USSR in 1991.

Zakharov served as the artistic director at the Lenkom Theatre from 1973 till his death. He gathered a "dream team" of actors and reestablished Lenkom as one of the leading Soviet theatres.

== Life and career ==
Mark Zakharov was born in Moscow into a family of teachers. His paternal grandfather Boris Shirinkin belonged to Russian nobility and was killed in action during World War I, while his paternal grandmother belonged to Crimean Karaites. His father Anatoly Shirinkin served as a Red Army soldier during the Russian Civil War, then worked as a school teacher in physical culture before being arrested in 1934 for counter-revolutionary activity and sentenced to three years in prison; he took part in the Great Patriotic War and in 1949 was expelled from Moscow again for several years as "previously convicted".

Zakharov's mother Galina Sergeevna Zakharova (née Bardina) was a trained actress who led children's acting classes. His maternal grandfather Sergei Nikolaevich Bardin was a White officer who fought under Alexander Kolchak before leaving for Australia; his wife Sophia Nikolaevna Bardina chose to stay in Russia and headed an orphanage. As Zakharov himself wrote, "[I] always considered myself Russian, even though my father admitted that we also had Tatar blood.

Zakharov was raised in Moscow, where he was encouraged by his mother in his persistent efforts to become an actor. He was admitted after several attempts, and graduated from the acting school of the State Theatre Institute in 1955.

Zakharov was the Artistic Director of Moscow's Lenkom Theatre since 1973, where he helped to define the landscape of Moscow's theatrical culture. Zakharov helped create an ensemble of actors who worked with him at Lenkom, including: Yevgeny Leonov, Inna Churikova, Leonid Bronevoy, Oleg Yankovsky, Aleksandr Abdulov, Nikolai Karachentsov, Tatyana Pelttser, Aleksandr Zbruyev, Aleksandra Zakharova, Tatyana Kravchenko, Aleksandr Lazarev, and Dmitry Pevtsov.

Zakharov was a supporter of the United Russia party. He had previously publicly burned his Communist Party card. His name appeared on a petition opposing Russian annexation of Crimea, however, he himself denied ever signing it. He stated in an interview that he opposed Russian soldiers being deployed to Ukraine as it reminded him the start of the Afghanistan conflict, however, he also couldn't imagine Russia without Crimea. He also stated that had he been offered to sign a letter supporting the annexation, he would've signed it.

Mark Zakharov died in Moscow on 28 September 2019, 15 days before his 86th birthday. He was buried at the Novodevichy Cemetery near Stanislav Govorukhin, Leonid Bronevoy and Oleg Tabakov.

== Musical productions ==
- Juno and Avos, a rock opera

== Filmography ==
- Train Stop – Two Minutes (1972)
- Wake Up and Sing (TV, 1974)
- The Star of Captivating Happiness (1975) (screenplay)
- The Twelve Chairs (1976)
- An Ordinary Miracle (1978)
- The Very Same Munchhausen (1979)
- The House That Swift Built (1983)
- Formula of Love (1984)
- To Kill a Dragon (1988)
- Balakirev the Buffoon (2002)

== Honours and awards ==
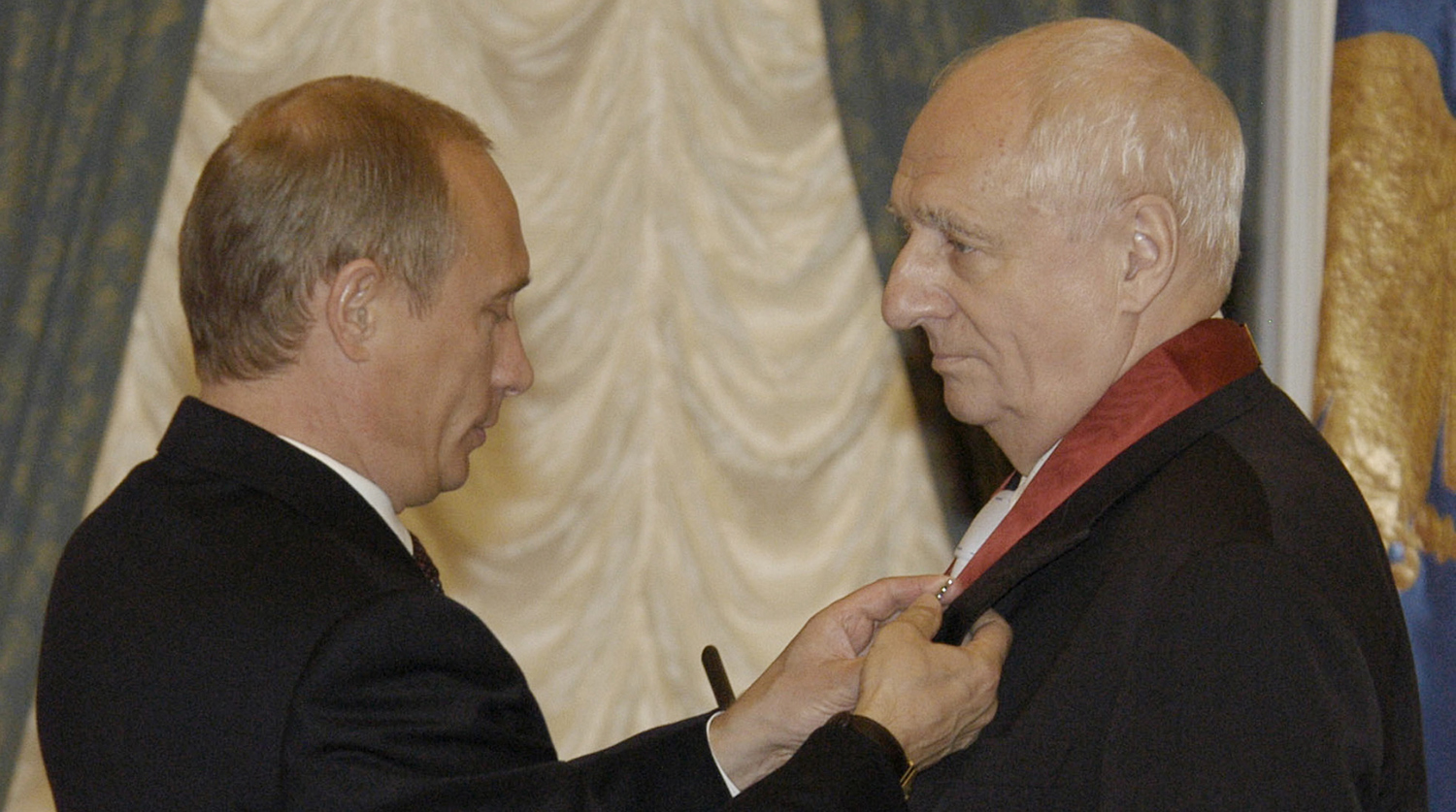
Vladimir Putin presentated of the Order for Merit to the Fatherland, 2nd class (June 25, 2004)

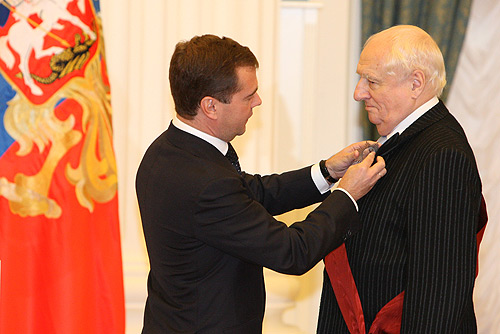
Dmitry Medvedev receiving the Order of Service to the Fatherland I class in 2008

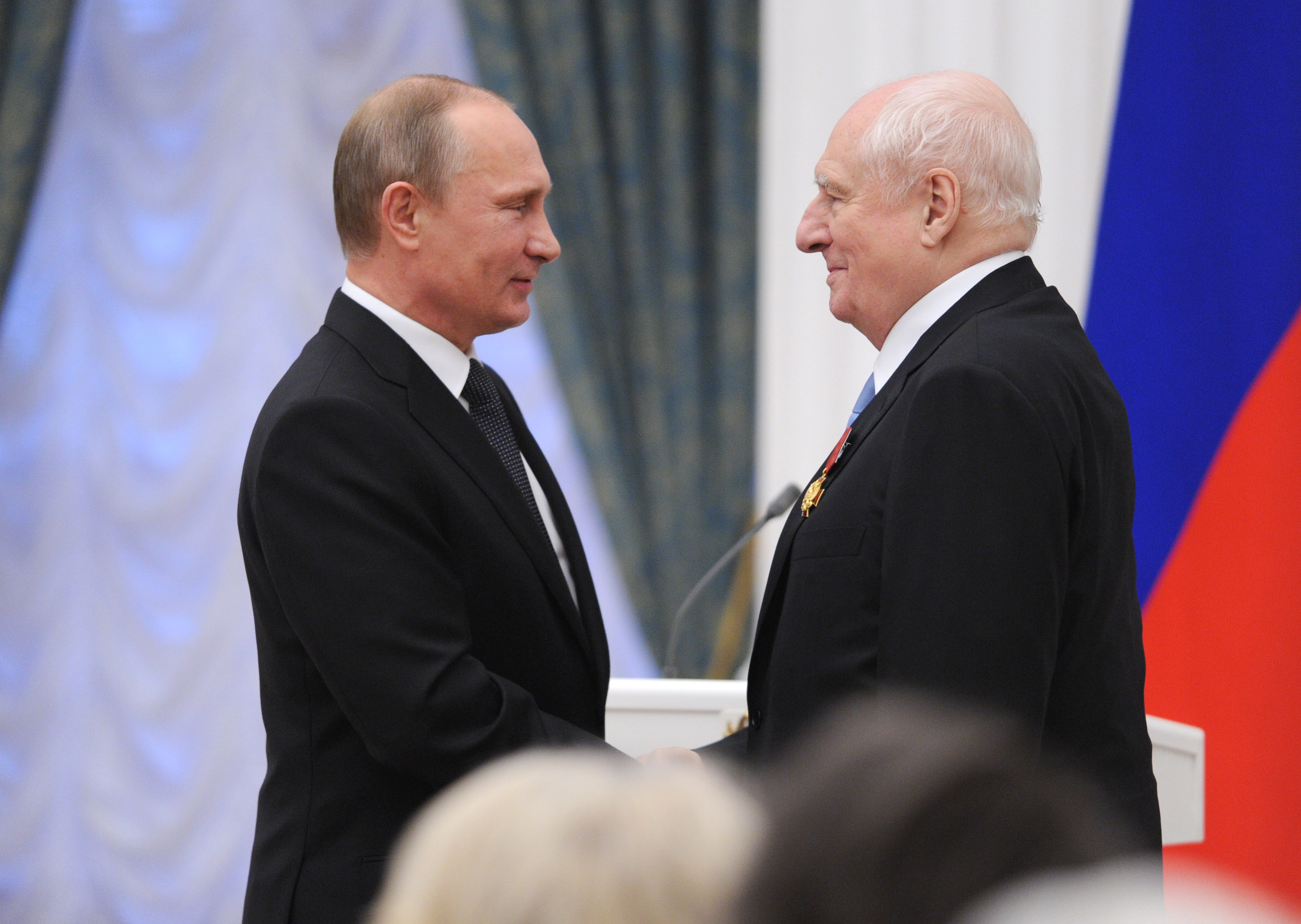
Vladimir Putin presentated of the Order for Merit to the Fatherland, 4th class (October 29, 2013)

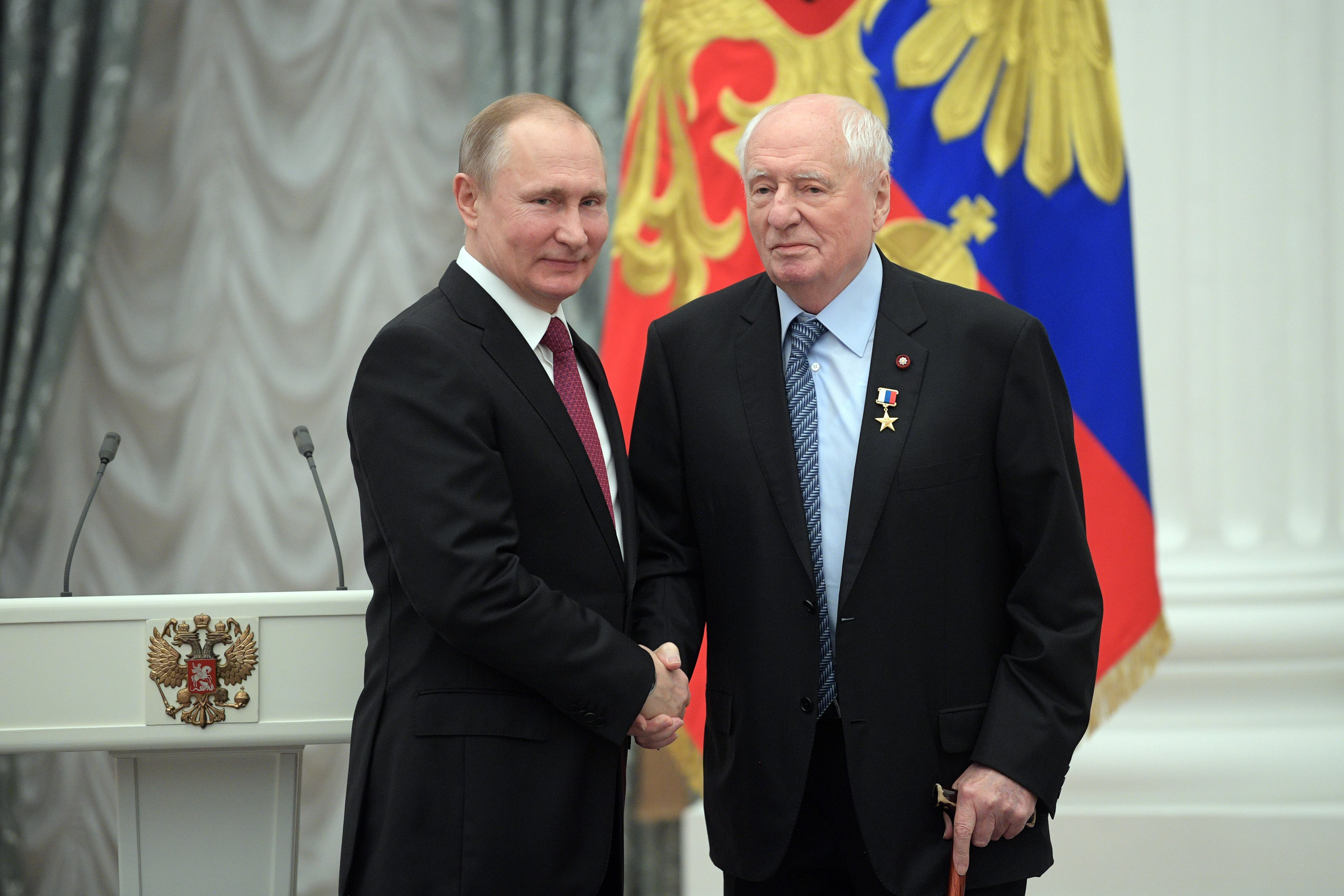
Presentated of the star of Hero of Labour of the Russian Federation (April 25, 2018)

- Order of Friendship of Peoples
- Order of Merit for the Fatherland;
  - 1st class (13 October 2008) – for outstanding contribution to the development of domestic theatrical art and many years of creative activity
  - 2nd class (11 October 2003) – for outstanding contribution to the development of theatrical arts
  - 3rd class (26 April 1997) – for services to the state and the great personal contribution to the development of theatrical art
  - 4th class (13 September 2013)
- Honored Art Worker of the RSFSR (1977)
- People's Artist of the USSR (1991)
- USSR State Prize (1987) – for the production of plays in the Lenkom Theatre
- Russian Federation State Prize (1992, 1997, 2002)
- National Award "Musical Heart of Theatre" (2007) – Winner of the Grand Award for outstanding creative achievement in the field of musical theatre
- Honorary Member of the Russian Academy of Arts
- International Stanislavsky Theatre Award (2010) – "for his contribution to the development of Russian theatre"
- The minor planet 5359 Markzakharov was named in his honour
- Hero of Labour of the Russian Federation (2018)

== See also ==
- Grigori Gorin, the playwright of many Zakharov's plays and films
