= Oleg Yankovsky =

Soviet & Russian actor (1944–2009)

- Олег Янковский
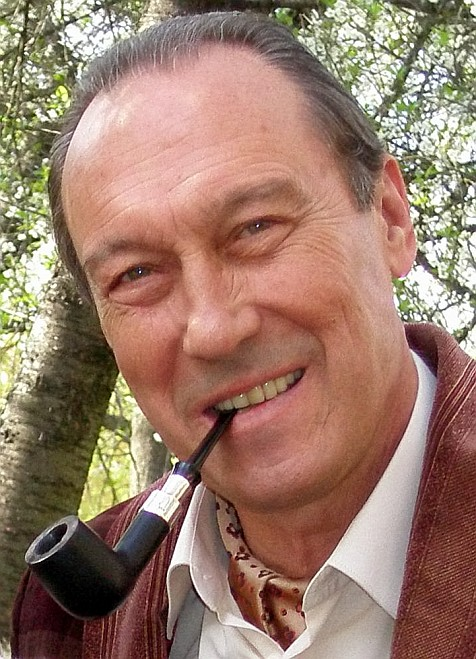
- Yankovsky in 2007
- Born: Oleg Ivanovich Yankovsky; 23 February 1944; Jezkazgan, Kazakh SSR, USSR (now Kazakhstan)
- Died: 20 May 2009 (aged 65); Moscow, Russia
- Resting place: Novodevichy Cemetery, Moscow, Russia
- Education: Sobinov Theatre Institute of the Saratov State Conservatory
- Occupation: Actor
- Years active: 1965–2009
- Employer: Saratov Drama Theater
- Title: People's Artist of the USSR (1991)
- Spouse: Lyudmila Zorina
- Children: Filipp Yankovsky
- Awards

Oleg Ivanovich Yankovsky (Russian: Оле́г Ива́нович Янко́вский; 23 February 1944 – 20 May 2009) was a Soviet and Russian actor who excelled in psychologically sophisticated roles of modern intellectuals. In 1991, he became, together with Sofia Pilyavskaya, the last person to be named a People's Artist of the USSR.

== Biography ==
=== Early life ===
Oleg Ivanovich Yankovsky was born on 23 February 1944 in Jezkazgan, Kazakh SSR (now Kazakhstan). His family was of noble Russian, Belarusian and Polish ancestry. His father, Ivan Pavlovich, was Life-Guards Semenovsky Regiment's Stabskapitän. Yankovsky's father was arrested during the purges in the Red Army after the Tukhachevsky case and was deported with his family to Kazakhstan, where he died in the camps of the Gulag system.

After the death of Stalin, the Yankovsky family was able to leave Central Asia for Saratov. Oleg's eldest brother, Rostislav, after graduating from the Sobinov Theatre Institute of the Saratov State Conservatory, went to Minsk to play at the Russian Theater. He took 14-year-old Oleg with him due to financial concerns, as in the family there was only one breadwinner – middle brother Nikolay. In Minsk, the youngest Yankovsky made his debut on the stage – it was necessary to substitute the sick performer of the episodic role of the boy in the play The Drummer.

=== Career ===
After leaving school, Yankovsky returned to Saratov, where in 1965 he graduated from the Saratov Theater School. After graduation, he was accepted into the troupe of the Saratov Drama Theater, where for eight years of work he played a number of leading roles. After success in the role of Prince Myshkin in the play The Idiot in 1973, he was invited to the Lenkom Theatre.

Yankovsky's film career was launched when he was cast in two movies, The Shield and the Sword (1968) by director Vladimir Basov about World War II and Two Comrades Were Serving (1968) by Yevgeny Karelov about the Russian Civil War.

During his prolific screen career, Yankovsky appeared in many film adaptations of Russian classics, notably A Hunting Accident (1977) and The Kreutzer Sonata (1987). A leading actor of Mark Zakharov's Lenkom Theatre since 1975, he starred in the TV versions of the theatre's productions, An Ordinary Miracle (1978) and The Very Same Munchhausen (1979), being the most notable. For his role in Roman Balayan's Flights in Dreams and Reality (1984), Yankovsky was awarded the USSR State Prize. He has been better known abroad for his parts in Tarkovsky's movies Mirror (as the father) and Nostalghia (in the main role).

In the early 1990s, Yankovsky also played quite different roles in Georgiy Daneliya’s tragic comedy Passport (1990) and in Karen Shakhnazarov’s historical and psychological drama The Assassin of the Tsar (1991). In 1991, he was the president of the jury at the 17th Moscow International Film Festival.

Starting in 1993, Yankovsky ran the Kinotavr Film Festival in Sochi. He continued to receive awards for his work with several Nika Awards from the Russian Film Academy for his directorial debut Come Look at Me (2001) and Valery Todorovsky's Lyubovnik (2002). He appeared as Count Pahlen in Poor Poor Paul (2004) and as Komarovsky in a TV adaptation of Doctor Zhivago (2006), directed by Oleg Menshikov.

The last film Yankovsky appeared in was Tsar, which was released in 2009 and screened at the Cannes Film Festival on 17 May 2009, just three days before his death. Yankovsky played the sophisticated role of Metropolitan Philip in his last film.

=== Death ===
On 20 May 2009, Yankovsky died from pancreatic cancer in Moscow, aged 65. A civil funeral took place at the Lenkom Theater. His burial was held on 22 May 2009 at Novodevichy Cemetery in the presence of his close relatives only.

== Personal life ==
- Wife – Lyudmila Zorina (born 1 May 1941), actress, Merited Artist of the Russian Federation.
- Son – Filipp (born 10 October 1968), actor and film director.
- Daughter-in-law – Oksana Fandera (born 7 November 1967), actress.
- Grandchildren – Ivan (born 30 October 1990), actor; Elizaveta (born 1 May 1994).
- Brothers – Rostislav Yankovsky (5 February 1930 – 26 June 2016), actor, People's Artist of the USSR; Nikolai Ivanovich Yankovsky (26 July 1941 – 25 May 2015), deputy director of the Saratov Puppet Theater "Teremok".
- Nephew – Igor Yankovsky (29 April 1951 – 26 January 2025), actor and media manager.

== Filmography ==
- O lyubvi (1966) as Andrei
- The Shield and the Sword (Щит и меч) (1968, TV Mini-Series) as Heinrich Schwarzkopf
- Two Comrades Were Serving (Служили два товарища) (1968) as Andrei Nekrasov
- Wait For Me, Anna (Жди меня, Анна) (1969) as Sergei Novikov
- Those Who Have Kept the Fire (Сохранившие огонь) (1970, TV Movie) as Semen
- I Am Francysk Skaryna (Я, Франциск Скорина) (1970) as Francysk Skaryna
- About Love (О любви) (1970) as Andrew, a friend of Nicholas
- Atonement (Расплата) (1970) as Alexis Platov
- Operation "Holtsauge" (Операция "Хольцауге") (1970) as Frank Ritter
- Racers (Гонщики) (1972) as Nikolai Sergachev
- Wrath (Гнев) (1974) as Leonte Chebotaru
- Under a Stone Sky (Под каменным небом) (1974) as Jasjika, soldat
- Unexpected Joy (Нечаянные радости) (1974) as Alexei Kanin (The film was not finished)
- Police Sergeant (Сержант милиции) (1974) as Criminal nicknamed Prince
- Mirror (Зеркало) (1975) as the father
- Bonus (Премия) (1975) as Lev Solomahin
- The Captivating Star of Happiness (Звезда пленительного счастья) (1975) as Kondraty Ryleyev
- Theater - this is my home (Мой дом - театр) (1975) as Dmitri A. Gorev, provincial tragedian
- Trust (Доверие) (1976) as Georgy Pyatakov
- Other people's letters (Чужие письма) (1976) as Zhenya Priakhin
- Sentimental Romance (Сентиментальный роман) (1976) as Ilya Gorodetsky
- Seventy-two degrees below zero (Семьдесят два градуса ниже нуля) (1976) as navigator Sergey Popov
- Retired colonel (Полковник в отставке) (1977) as Alexei, son of colonel
- Word for protection (Слово для защиты) (1976) as Ruslan Shevernev
- Long criminal case (Длинное, длинное дело) (1977) as attorney Vladimir Vorontsov
- Sweet Woman (Сладкая женщина) (1977) as Tikhon Sokolov
- Wrong Connection (Обратная связь) (1977) as Leonid Aleksandrovich Sakulin
- A Hunting Accident (Мой ласковый и нежный зверь) (1978) as Sergey Kamyshev
- An Ordinary Miracle (Обыкновенное чудо) (1979, TV Movie) as The Wizard
- Turnabout (Поворот) (1979) as Victor Vedeneev
- The Very Same Munchhausen (Тот самый Мюнхгаузен) (1979, TV Movie) as Baron Munchausen
- Open book (Открытая книга) (1979) as Raevski
- We are the undersigned (Мы, нижеподписавшиеся...) (1981, TV Movie) as Gennady Semenov
- The Belkin Tales. The Shot (Повести Белкина. Выстрел) (1981) as Count
- The Hound of the Baskervilles (Собака Баскервилей) (1981, TV Mini-Series) as Jack Stapleton
- Hat (Шляпа) (1981) as Dmitri Denisov
- Love by Request (Влюблен по собственному желанию) (1983) as Igor Bragin
- The House That Swift Built (Дом, который построил Свифт) (1982, TV Movie) as Jonathan Swift
- Flights in Dreams and Reality (Полёты во сне и наяву) (1983) as Sergey Makarov
- Nostalghia (Ностальгия) (1983) as Andrei Gorchakov
- Kiss (Поцелуй) (1983, TV Movie) as staff captain Michael Ryabovitch
- Two hussar (Два гусара) (1984) as Count Fyodor Turbin
- Keep me, my talisman (Храни меня, мой талисман) (1986) as Alexey
- The Kreutzer Sonata (Крейцерова соната) (1987) as Vasily Pozdnyshev
- Tracker (Филёр) (1987) as Vorobyov
- To Kill a Dragon (Убить Дракона) (1988) as Dragon
- My 20th Century (Мой двадцатый век) (1989) as Z
- Mado, Hold for Pick Up (1990) as director Jean-Marie
- Passport (Паспорт) (1990) as Boris
- The Assassin of the Tsar (Цареубийца) (1991) as Dr.Smirnov / Tsar Nicholas II
- Dreams of Russia (Сны о России) (1992) as Erik Laxmann
- Dark (Тьма) (1992) as Terrorist
- Me Ivan, You Abraham (Я - Иван, ты - Абрам) (1993) as Prince
- Terra incognita (1994) as Odi Atragon
- Mute Witness (Немой свидетель) (1995) as Larsen
- ...Pervaya lyubov (1995)
- The Government Inspector (Ревизор) (1996) as Judge Lyapkin-Tyapkin
- The Fatal Eggs (Роковые яйца) (1996) as Vladimir Ipat'evich Persikov
- Muzhchina dlya molodoy zhenshchiny (1996)
- Milyy drug davno zabytykh let... (1996)
- Alissa (1998) as Kosicz
- Rayskoye yablochko (1998) as Zhora
- Paradise apple (Райское яблочко) (1998) as George
- Chinese Tea Set (Китайский сервиз) (1999) as Count Stroganov
- The Man Who Cried (Человек, который плакал) (2000) as Father
- Town Musicians of Bremen&Co (Бременские музыканты и Со) (2000) as Old Troubadour
- Come Look at Me (Приходи на меня посмотреть) (2001) as Igor
- Patul lui Procust (2002) as George Ladima
- The Lover (Любовник) (2002) as Dmitry Charyshev
- Poor Poor Paul (Бедный, бедный Павел) (2003) as Count Pahlen
- Doctor Zhivago (Доктор Живаго) (2006, TV Mini-Series) as Komarovsky
- Guilty Without Fault (Без вины виноватые) (2008) as Gregory Muroff
- Stilyagi (Стиляги) (2008) as Fred's father
- Birds of Paradise (Райские птицы) (2008) as Nicholas
- Tsar (Царь) (2009) as Metropolitan Philip Kolychev
- Anna Karenina (Анна Каренина) (2009, TV Mini-Series) as Alexei Karenin (final appearance)

== Honours and awards ==
Soviet and Russian awards

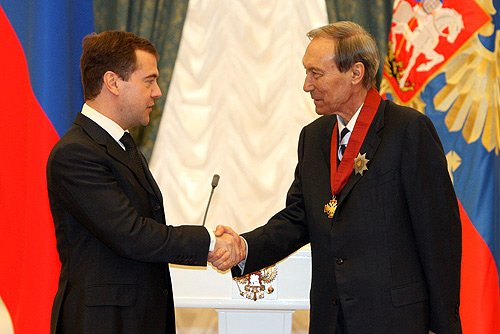
With Dmitry Medvedev on presentation of the Order "For Merit to the Fatherland", 2nd class, 5 March 2009

- 1977 – Honored Artist of the RSFSR
- 1984 – People's Artist of the RSFSR
- 1987 – USSR State Prize – for his role in "Flights in dream and reality"
- 1989 – Vasilyev Brothers State Prize of the RSFSR – for role in "The Kreutzer Sonata"
- 1991 – People's Artist of the USSR
- 28 December 1995 – Order "For Merit to the Fatherland", 4th class – for services to the state, many years of fruitful work in the arts and culture
- 1996 – State Prize of the Russian Federation – the main role in Anton Chekhov's play "The Seagull" at the Moscow State Theatre, (Lenkom)
- 2002 – State Prize of the Russian Federation – the main role in the play "Jester Balakirev" of the Moscow State Theatre
- 11 August 2007 – Order "For Merit to the Fatherland", 3rd class – for his great contribution to the development of theatrical art, and many years of fruitful activity
- 23 February 2009 – Order "For Merit to the Fatherland", 2nd class – for outstanding contributions to the development of domestic theatrical and cinematic arts

Cinematic and public awards

- 1977 – Lenin Komsomol Prize – "for talented contemporary incarnation of the images in the movie"
- 1983 – Best Actor of the Year – for starring in the film Love by Request (according to a poll of the magazine "Soviet Screen")
- 1983 – Winner of the category "Best actor" of the All-Union Film Festival
- 1988 – Prize for Best Actor (in the film "Filer") at Valladolid International Film Festival
- 1989 – Award "for outstanding contributions to the profession" at the "Constellation" (Sozvezdie) film festival for his role in To Kill a Dragon
- 1991 – Nika Award, three times; in the "Actor", for Best Actor in the film "Regicide" and for Best Actor in the film "Passport"
- 2001 – Award for Best Actor at the Sochi Open Russian Film Festival Kinotavr – for the film "Come Look at Me"
- 2001 – Prize of the Russian Cultural Foundation at ORFF Kinotavr in Sochi
- 2001 – Grand Prix "Gold" Listapad at the Minsk International Film Festival "Listapad" – for his role in "Come look at me"
- 2001 – First place in the competition "Vyborg Account" at the film festival "Window to Europe" in Vyborg – for the film "Come Look at Me"
- 2001 – Stanislavsky Theatre Prize – for the main role in the play "Jester Balakirev" of the Moscow State Theatre, "Lenk" [74]
- 2002 – Nika Award – for Best Actor in the film "The Lover"
- 2002 – The award "Golden Aries" – for Best Actor in the film "The Lover"
- 2002 – Award for Best Actor at the ORFF "Kinotavr" in Sochi – for his role in "The Lover"
- 2002 – Award for Best Actor at the festival "Constellation" – for his role in the movie "The Lover"
- 2002 – Winner of "Idol" in the "Idol of the Year" – for the main role in the play "Jester Balakirev" of the Moscow State Theatre, "Lenk" and for his role in "Come look at me"
- 2003 – Golden Eagle Award – for Best Supporting Actor in the film "Poor, Poor Pavel"
- 2003 – Special Award from the Administration of Krasnodar Krai ORFF "Kinotavr" in Sochi
- 2005 – Theatre Prize "Hit of the Season" – for the play "Tout payé", or "Paid by all"
- 2006 – Golden Eagle Award – for Best Actor on Television (in multiserial film "Doctor Zhivago")
- 2006 – Prize of the Russian Television Academy TEFI – for best actor on television (in multiserial film "Doctor Zhivago")
- 2007 – Award "Triumph"
- 2008 – Public award – the Order of St. Alexander Nevsky, "For Fatherland and work"
- 2009 – Award "Triumph"
- 2009 – Stanislavsky Award (posthumously given to his son Filipp)
- 2009 – Prize "long-term President" Kinotavr – for outstanding contribution to Russian cinema" (posthumously)
- 2009 – Award for Best Actor at the "Constellation" (Sozvezdie) film festival – a starring role in "Anna Karenina" (posthumously)
- 2010 – Golden Eagle Special Prize for his contribution to the development of national cinema (posthumously)
- 2010 – Nika Award for 2009 – "Best Actor" (posthumously), for the combination of roles in the film "Anna Karenina" and "King"
