= Lyudmila Porgina =

Soviet and Russian actress

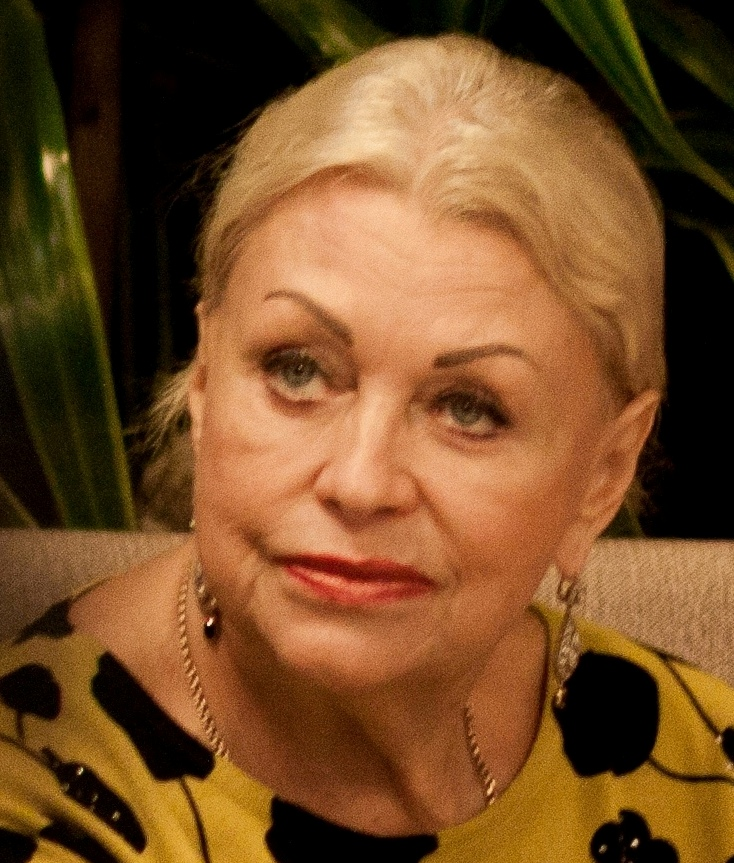
- Born: Lyudmila Andreevna Porgina; November 24, 1948 (age 77); Moscow, Russian SFSR, Soviet Union
- Occupation: Actress
- Years active: Since 1972
- Spouse: Nikolai Karachentsov (m. 1975; died 2018)

Lyudmila Andreevna Porgina (Russian: Людмила Андреевна По́ргина; born November 24, 1948) is a Soviet and Russian stage and film actress, named an Honored Artist of the Russian Federation in 1999 and the widow of actor Nikolai Karachentsov.
