= Ivan Balakirev =

Court jester of Peter I

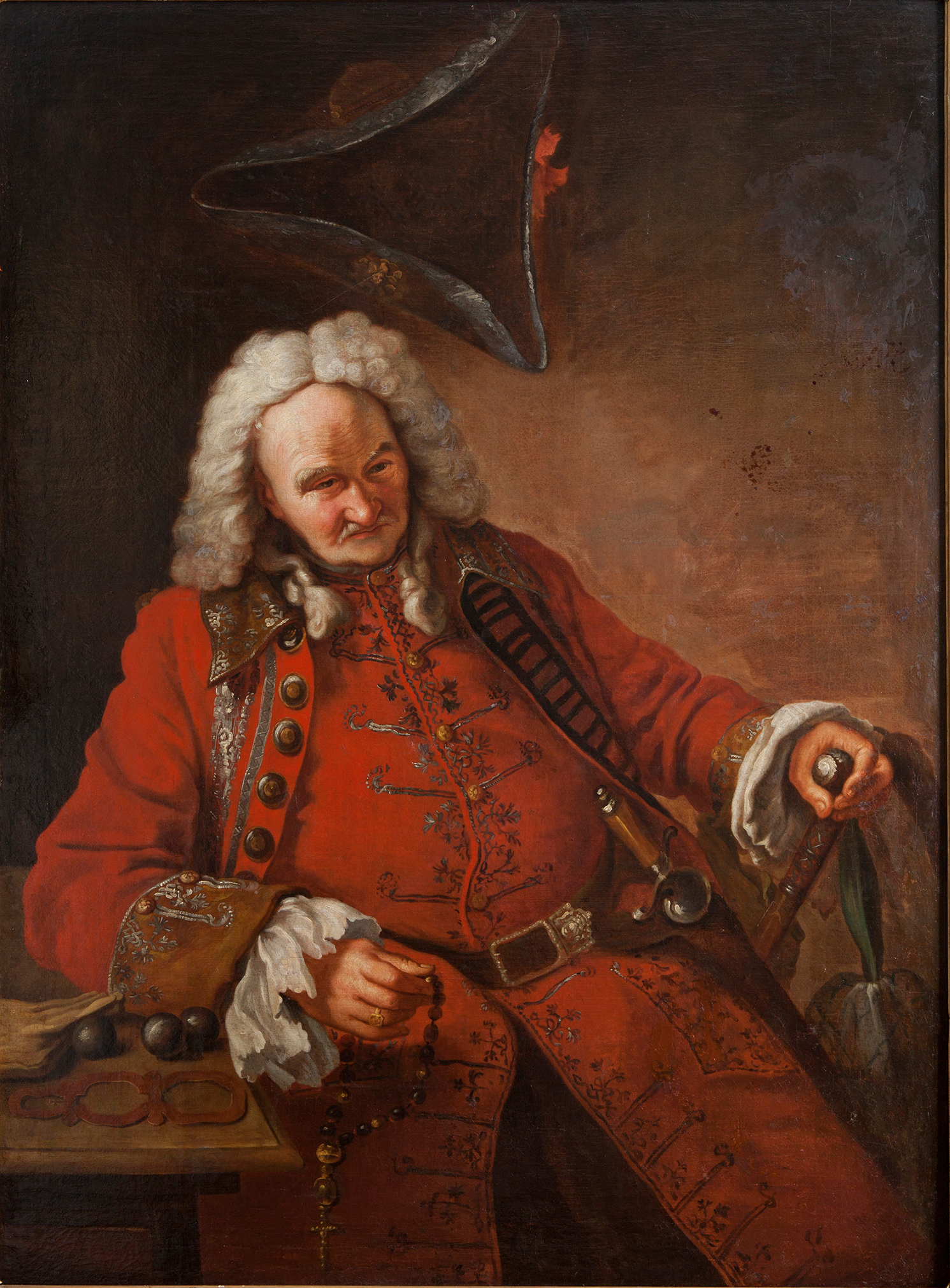
- Born: 1699; Russian Empire
- Died: 1763; Kasimov, Russian Empire
- Occupation: Jester

Ivan Aleksandrovich Balakirev (Russian: Ива́н Александрович Бала́кирев; 1699–1763) was a court jester to Peter I of Russia.

== Biography ==
Ivan Aleksandrovich Balakirev came from an old noble family. The surname Balakirev is believed to derive from the Tatar words bala kire, meaning "stubborn child." The Balakirev family had lived in the Ryazan principality since the 16th century. By the 17th century, members of the family were serving at court; one of them held the rank of stolnik (a court attendant or steward) under Alexis of Russia. Ivan Aleksandrovich himself was from the Kostroma branch of the Balakirev family.

He was first introduced to Peter I in 1715 in St. Petersburg, after which he was assigned to the Preobrazhensky Regiment as a soldier. He was ordered to study engineering. In 1719 he was taken to the palace for "domestic servants". He was assigned as a rider to Ekaterina Alekseevna.

In 1722, travelling along the River Oka to the Persian campaign, Peter I visited for the second time in Kasimov. The retinue of Peter the Great and Ivan was Balakirev. He learned that the title of the ruler of the city is not busy, and asked for permission to be called the king khan of Kasimov. King jokingly agreed, so in Kasimov reappeared khan. Initially, the title was formal, but after the death of Peter the Great, by decree of Catherine I, Balakirev received ownership of the former estate of Kasimov kings, the rank of lieutenant of the Life Guards and the title of King Kasimov. Balakirev died in Kasimov. His grave is located behind the altar of the church of St. George.

In 1723 he became an approximate chamberlain of Willem Mons; served as a messenger between him and Catherine. On April 26, 1724, Balakirev informed the student of the case of Suvorov that he was carrying letters from Catherine to Mons. On November 5, 1724, an anonymous denunciation on Balakirev came to the emperor. The inquiry was entrusted to A.I. Ushakov. Peter I ordered the torture of Balakirev, and he reported on Mons' bribes. Mons was executed, and Balakirev, as an accomplice, was sentenced to 60 batogo blows and exile in Paldiski for three years.

In 1725, after the death of Peter the Great and the accession to the throne of Catherine I, Balakirev was returned to St. Petersburg. He was awarded the rank of praporshchik of the Preobrazhensky Regiment. Balakirev was assigned to the court of the empress without a specific position. In 1726, by decree of Catherine I, Balakirev received the right to own the former estates of the Kasimov kings, the rank of lieutenant of the Life Guards and the title of “Tsar of Kasimov”.

In 1731, Empress Anna Ioannovna enrolled Balakirev in the staff of "fools" - court jesters. He was witty, but too rude. For his speeches he was invited by the Secret Chancellery. From the Secret Chancellery he was personally rescued by the Empress with the "suggestion not to speak too much."

He was several times awarded by Anna Ioannovna and enjoyed her patronage. For example, when in 1732 he married the daughter of Posadsky Morozov and did not receive the 2000 rubles promised to him as a dowry, the Empress personally ordered they be obtained for him from the bride's relatives.

In St. Petersburg, he owned his own house in the parish of the Resurrection of Christ beyond the Foundry.

In the spring of 1740, he asked Ann Ivanovna to be out in his estate by the fall, but after the news of the death of the latter, he no longer returned to the court, remaining in the province.

He was married, but had no children. He died in Kasimov in 1763. His grave is located behind the altar of the St. George Church.
