= Lenkom Theatre =

Theatre in Moscow, Russia

Lenkom
- Ленком
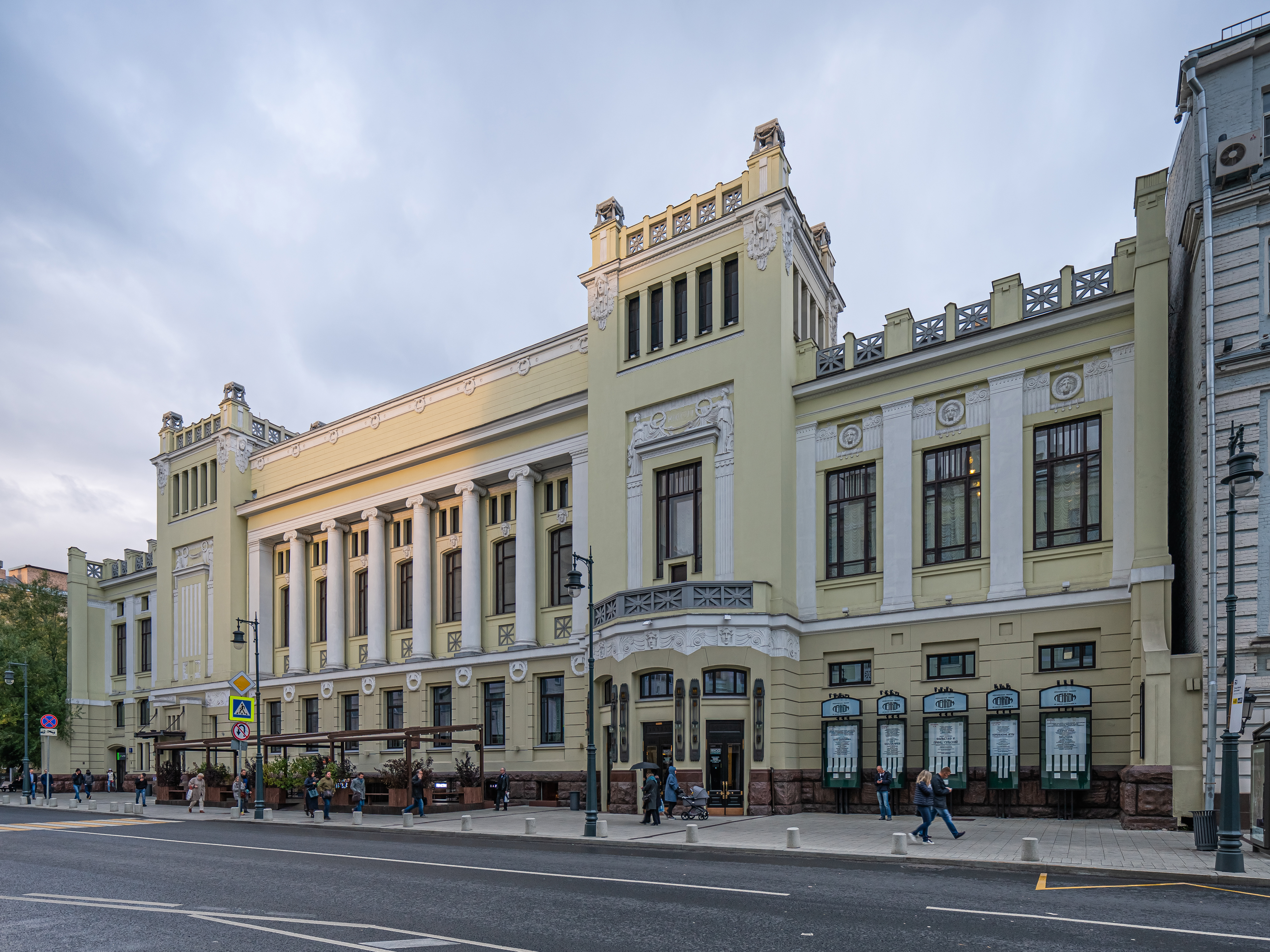
- Former Merchant Club in 2019
- Interactive map of Lenkom
- Address: Malaya Dmitrovka 6 Tverskoy District, Moscow, Russia; Russia
- Coordinates: 55°46′04″N 37°36′24″E
- Public transit: Tverskaya, Pushkinskaya, Chekhovskaya (Moscow Metro)

Construction
- Opened: 1909
- Architect: Illarion Ivanov-Schitz

Website
- www.lenkom.ru

Lenkom Theatre, formerly known as Lenin’s Komsomol Moscow Theatre or Moscow Leninist Komsomol Theatre is the official name of what was once known as the Moscow State Theatre named after Komsomol, a Communist youth league set up by Vladimir Lenin.

Designed by Illarion Ivanov-Schitz, it was built in 1907−1909 to house a Merchant's Club, and was home to many theatrical and musical performances. Occupied following the February Revolution, 1917 the building had several uses before becoming the home of "Theatre for Working Youth" (TRAM) in 1927. Thus, the future theatre established its reputation as a theatre for young people, by young people. Over its 80-year career, Lenkom has been a forerunner of new, fresh and experimental theatre in the Soviet Union, and now Russia.

== House of Anarchy ==
The building was seized by the Moscow Federation of Anarchist Groups shortly after the February Revolution, and was renamed the House of Anarchy.

== Sverdlov Communist University ==
The building was then occupied by the Central School for Soviet and Party Work, which was soon renamed the Sverdlov Communist University after Yakov Sverdlov's death in March 1919.

== Lenkom ==
Lenkom has featured Russian artists, such as Aleksandr Abdulov (1975−2008), Leonid Bronevoy (1988−2017), Inna Churikova, Nikolai Karachentsov, Yevgeny Leonov, Tatyana Pelttser, Andrei Tarkovsky, and Oleg Yankovsky. Mark Zakharov served as the artistic director of the theatre from 1973 until his death in 2019.
