= Grigori Gorin =

Soviet and Russian playwright and writer

- Григо́рий Изра́илевич Го́рин
- Gorin in 1988
- Born: 12 March 1940; Moscow, RSFSR, Soviet Union
- Died: 15 June 2000 (aged 60); Moscow, Russia
- Resting place: Vagankovo Cemetery
- Citizenship: Soviet, Russian
- Education: First Moscow State Medical University
- Occupations: Poet, writer

Grigori Israilevich Gorin (Russian: Григо́рий Изра́илевич Го́рин, born Ofshtein (Russian: Офштейн); 12 March 1940 — 15 June 2000) was a Soviet and Russian playwright and writer of Jewish descent.

Gorin is particularly credited with scripts for several plays and films, which are regarded as important element of cultural reaction to the Era of Stagnation and perestroika in Soviet history.

== Biography ==
Gorin was born in Moscow to a Ukrainian Jewish family of Soviet Army officer father hailed from Podolian Volochysk and doctor mother. After graduation from the Sechenov 1st Moscow Medical Institute in 1963, Gorin worked as an ambulance doctor for some time (his mother spent her medical career on similar position).

He was involved in amateur playwriting during his student years. First, with the sketches for the students' local KVN network club. Gorin started publishing his satirical articles and sketches since 1960th, finally choosing writing as the professional career. He worked as a Chief of Humor Department in Yunost magazine, using Galka Galkina pen name.

In 1966, first book was published — Four Under One Cover (co-authored).

In 1978 — 1990 Gorin was a regular participant in the Vokrug Smekha (Around Laughter), the popular TV program.

He died suddenly at home in Moscow on the night of 15 June 2000, at the age of 61, from a massive heart attack. He was buried at the Vagankovo Cemetery.

== Dramaturgy ==
=== Selected works ===
- Til, 1970 — loosely based on Till Eulenspiegel and other national folklore
- Forget Herostratus! — tragic comedy, 1972
- The Very Truthful, 1974 — about Baron Munchausen
- The House That Swift Built, 1980
- Phenomenons, 1984
- Good Bye, Compere!, 1985
- Domestic Cat of Average Downiness, 1989 — co-authorship with Vladimir Voynovich
- Memorial prayer, 1989 theatrical, 1993 televised version - loosely based on a Sholem Aleichem work
- Kean IV, 1991 — loosely based on Edmund Kean's biography
- Plague on Both Your Houses!, 1994 — a loose sequel to Romeo and Juliet by William Shakespeare
- Royal Games, 1995
- Luckyman-Unluckyman (Schastlivtsev-Neschastlivtsev), 1997
- Balakirev The Buffoon, 1999 theatrical, 2002 televised version

== Screenplays ==
- To Kill a Dragon, 1988
- My Tenderly Loved Detective, 1986 (post-modernist comedy based on the Adventures of Sherlock Holmes)
- Formula of Love, 1984
- The House That Swift Built, 1983
- Say a Word for the Poor Hussar, 1980
- Naked Kurentsov, 1980
- Case on a Factory No. 6, 1980
- That Very Munchausen, 1979
- Velvet Season, 1978
- 100 Grammes for Bravery, 1976
- You to Me, Me to You, 1976
- Small Comedies of a Big House, 1975
- Stop Potapov!, 1974

== Cultural impact ==
Many of Gorin's aphorisms became popular among the Soviet people, e. g. piano in the bushes, which means painstaking preparations for a would-be impromptu. This particular one appeared in a humoresque called Quite accidentally by Arkanov and Gorin, published in that 1966 book.
