= Konstantin Viktorovich Apryatin =

Soviet film director and cinematographer

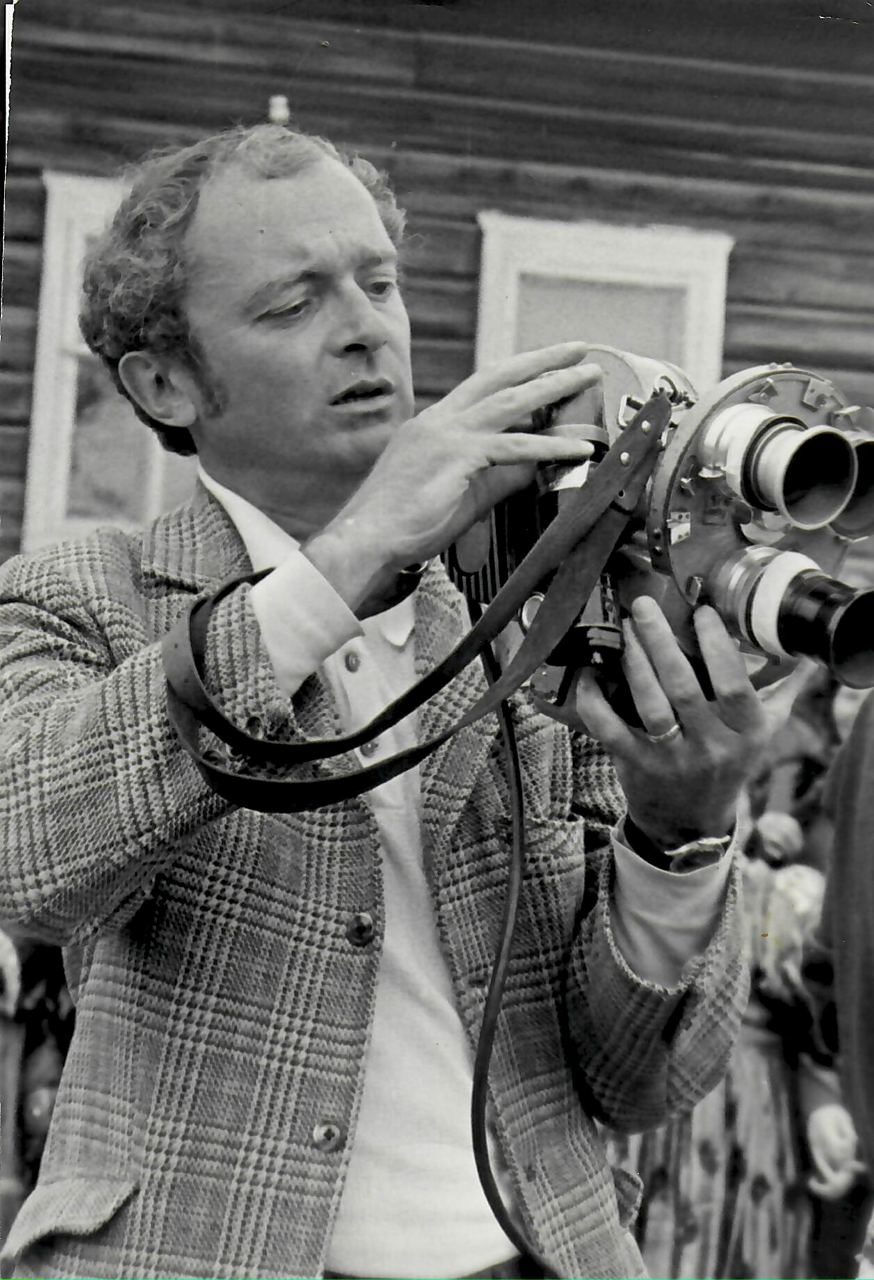
- Born: July 31, 1937; Leningrad, USSR
- Died: 2002
- Awards: USSR State Prize

Konstantin Viktorovich Apryatin (July 31, 1937, Leningrad — 2002, Moscow) was a Soviet film director and cinematographer.

== Biography ==
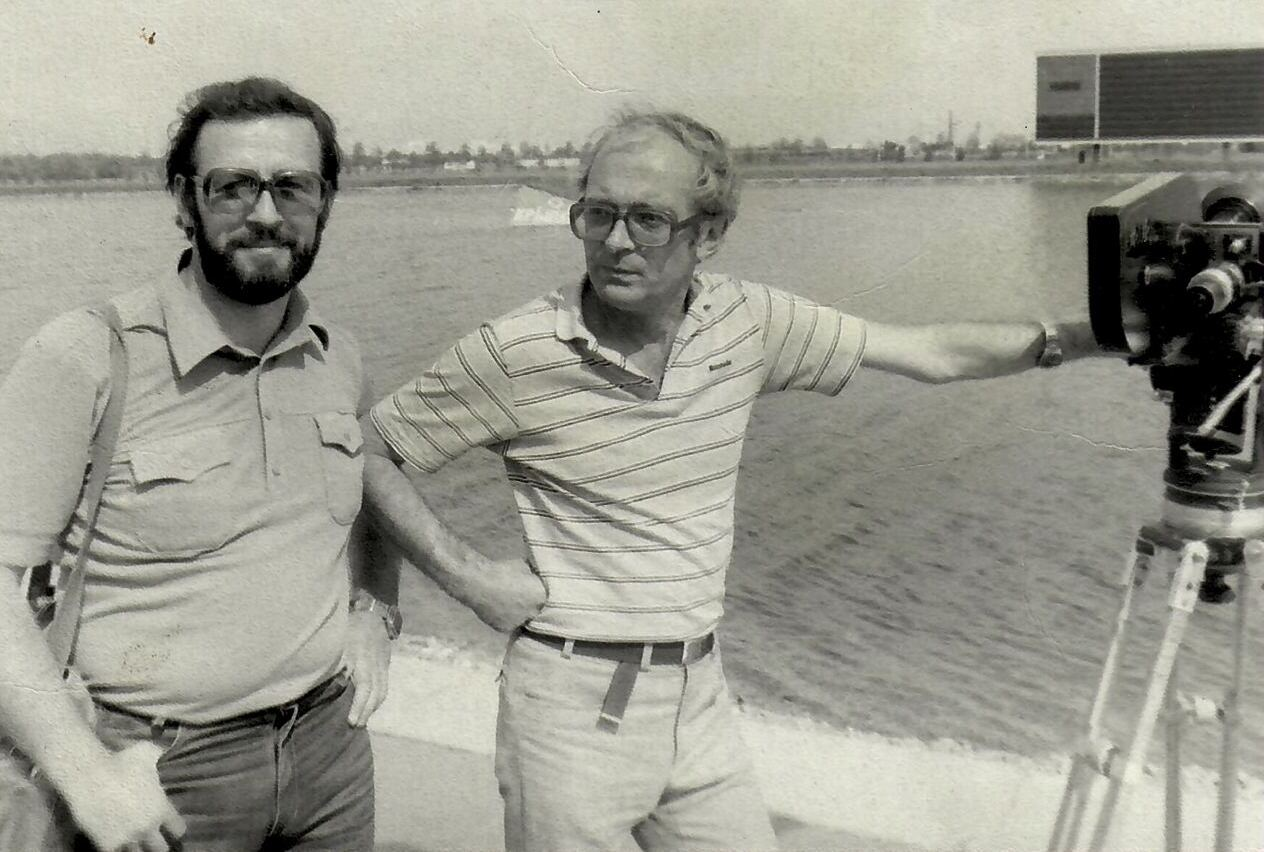
Production designer Vladimir Lykov and cameraman Konstantin Apryatin on the set of The Adventures of Electronik, 1978

Konstantin Apryatin was born on July 31, 1937, in Leningrad. His family often moved due to his father's work. The summer of 1941 they spent in the Saratov Region.

During the war years, he was in a children's home. The family reunited afterwards.

By 1951, he was living in Ufa. He completed school in 1955.

After school, he worked as a technician-tester at a radio plant.

In 1958, he enrolled at the Ural Polytechnic Institute. He completed three courses.

In 1961, he worked as a senior technician at the Project-Technological Institute.

In 1962, he enrolled in the All-Union State Institute of Cinematography.

In 1963, he was invited as a photo correspondent to Literaturnaya Gazeta.

In 1967, he graduated from the institute with a degree in "cinematographer" and was assigned to the position of cinematographer at the Moscow Television Center.

In 1970, he became a cinematographer-set designer for the creative association Studio Ekran.

Konstantin Apryatin was a member of the Union of Cinematographers of the USSR (Moscow branch, data as of March 1, 1981, according to the Handbook of the Union of Cinematographers of the USSR 1981 (compiled by G. Mirnova) // M., BPSK, Moscow Typography No. 6).

He collaborated extensively with Konstantin Bromberg, directing three of his films, including The Adventures of Electronik.

He is buried at the Troyekurovskoye Cemetery in Moscow.

== Recognition and awards ==
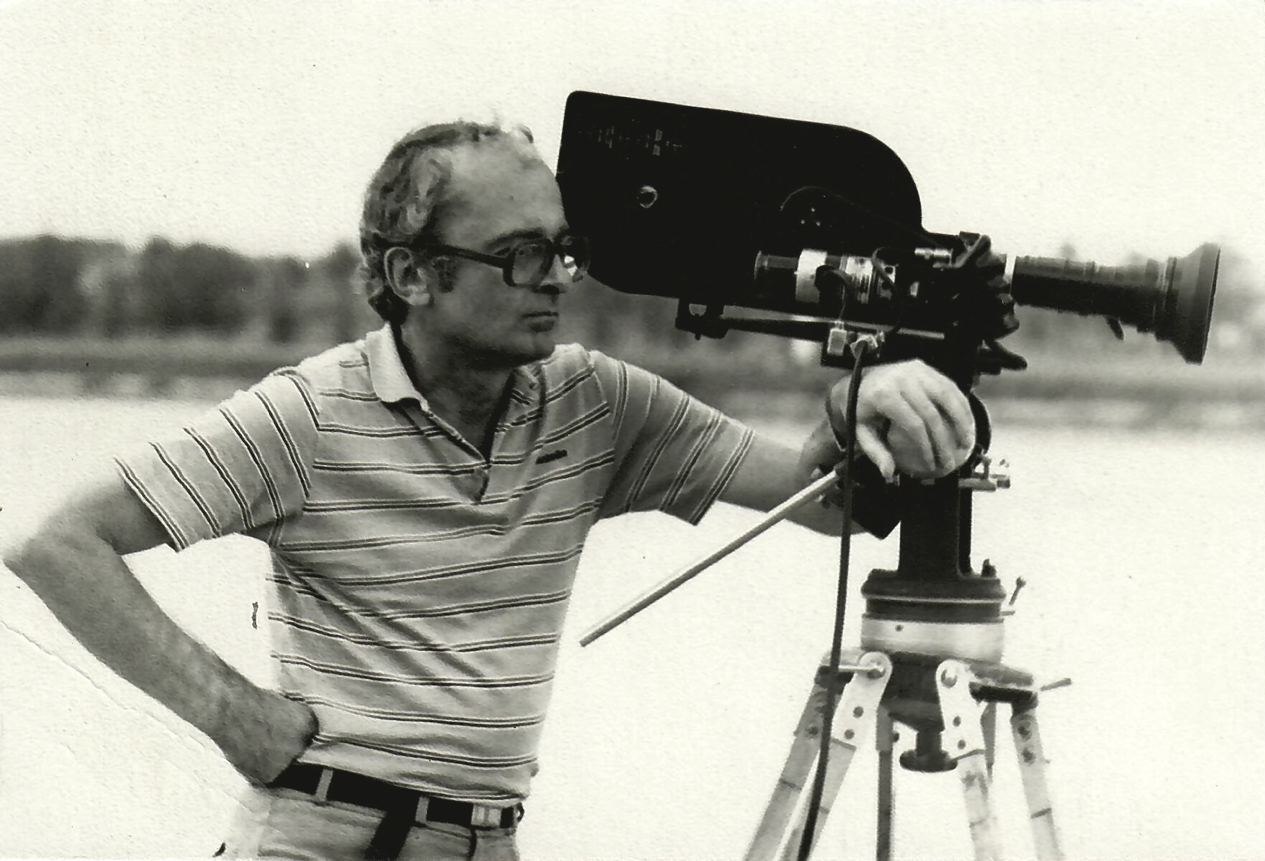
Konstantin Apryatin on the set of The Adventures of Electronik, 1978.

Recipient of the State Prize of the USSR (1982 — for cinematography in the film The Adventures of Electronik).

The film Pirosmani, for which Apryatin served as the cinematographer, received the following awards:

1973: Sutherland Trophy at the British Institute of Film Arts awards ceremony.

1974: Azolo IFF - Prize for Best Biographical Film.

1974: Chicago IFF - Golden Hugo Prize (Grand Prix).

== Filmography ==
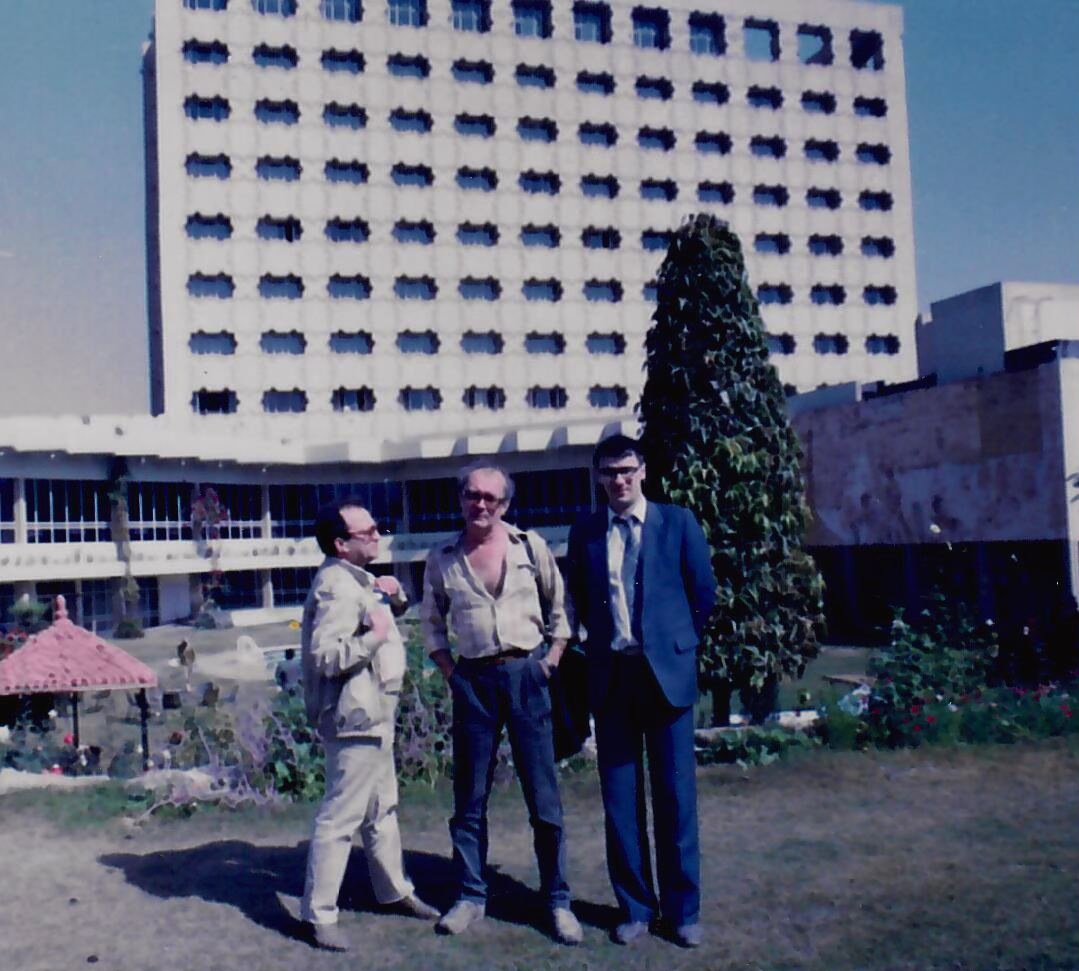
Apryatin (middle), Bromberg (left) on the set of The Adventures of Electronik, Odessa, 1978.

- Konstantin Viktorovich Apryatin

=== Cinematographer ===
- 1969 — Pirosmani (director Giorgi Shengelaia. Film received the Sutherland Trophy at the British Institute of Film Arts awards ceremony in 1973 and 2 awards at the Azolo and Chicago IFF in 1974)
- 1971 — Maria Pakhomenko's Chudo-Koni (director Konstantin Bromberg)
- 1971 — Maria Parkhomenko Sings (director Konstantin Bromberg)
- 1971 — Maria Parkhomenko's When Lions were Laughing (director Konstantin Bromberg)
- 1971 — There is no one Happier Than Me. Tatyana Shmyga (director Felix Glyamshin)
- 1973 — He Was a Real Trumpeter (director Konstantin Bromberg)
- 1974 — Artist's Day (director Boris Nirenburg)
- 1974 — Boris Babochkin reads excerpts from the works of Alexander Pushkin (director Boris Konukhov)
- 1975 — Giselle. Natalia Bessmertnova and Mikhail Lavrovsky (director Vladimir Grave)
- 1976 — Treating with Rowan (teleplay)
- 1976 — Elena Obraztsova (director Yuri Saakov)
- 1976 — Tovstonogov and theater (director Lev Yelagin)
- 1977 — Chopiniana. Production of the Bolshoi Theater of the USSR (director Vladimir Grave)
- 1979 — Grandmothers Said Twice... (director Valery Kharchenko)
- 1979 — The Adventures of Electronik (director Konstantin Bromberg)
- 1980 — Composer Valery Gavrilin (director Leonid Pchelkin)
- 1980 — Songs by Matvey Blanter to Poems by Mikhail Isakovsky (director Leonid Pchelkin)
- 1981 — Ordinary Miracles. Illusionist Arutyun Akopyan (director Nikolay Subbotin)
- 1981 — Your Brother Valentin (short)
- 1981 — In the Last Spring... Pyotr Ilyich Tchaikovsky (director Nikolai Subbotin)
- 1981 — Songs by Matvey Blanter to Poems by Mikhail Isakovsky. Sung by Bela Rudenko (director Leonid Pchelkin)
- 1982 — Sorcerers (director Konstantin Bromberg)
- 1983 — Rooster on Ice Skates (director Konstantin Bromberg)
- 1984 — Moments of Sport. A Movie About Strength, Agility and Unlimited Human Capabilities (director Konstantin Bromberg)
- 1984 — Sviatoslav Richter plays Joseph Haydn's Concerto (director Svyatoslav Chekin)
- 1984 — December Nights - 83. Film 1 (director Svyatoslav Chekin)
- 1985 — December Nights. Festival in the museum (director Svyatoslav Chekin)
- 1985 — December Nights. In the ensemble with Richter. Film 2 (director Svyatoslav Chekin)
- 1986 — Dialogues by Igor Bril (director Svyatoslav Chekin)
- 1990 — Voice of Memory. Anatoli Papanov (director Leonid Pchelkin)

=== Director ===
- 1971 — Pyotr Tchaikovsky. Symphony No. 6 (cameraman and director, cooperation with Konstantin Bromberg)
- 1977 — Holiday on Pechora (cameraman Leonid Zotenko)
- 1982 — Saturday and Sunday (short)

== Family ==
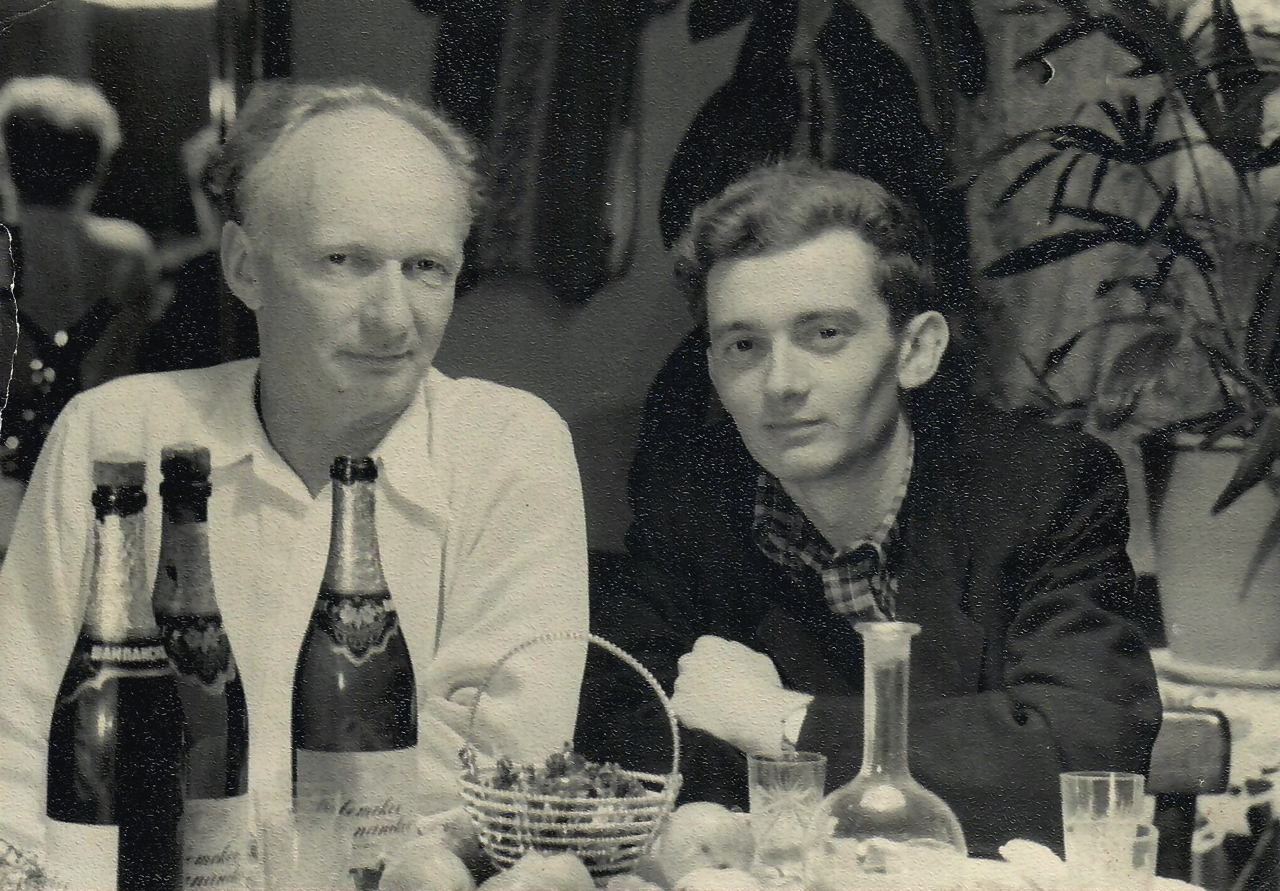
Konstantin Apryatin and his father - Viktor Apryatin, 1956

Sons — Yuly Konstantinovich Apryatin (12.08.1977), pr-specialist, blogger and traveler, Victor Apryatin (07.08.1968), artist, art dealer and publisher.

Father – Viktor Konstantinovich Apryatin (September 9, 1910, Baku – December 28, 1962, Ufa), engineer, worked in the oil and gas industry. Participated in the construction of the Guriev Oil Refinery Plant. Worked as an engineer on the main oil pipelines of the country, such as: Saratov-Moscow (awarded the Order of the Red Banner of Labour), Dashava-Kiev-Bryansk-Moscow, Bukhara-Western Siberia-Center, Druzhba pipeline. During the Soviet years, he was deprived of voting rights as an underage son, being dependent on his father who was deprived of rights and executed for counter-revolutionary activities.

Mother – Valentina Semenovna Apryatina (née Panina; January 20, 1911, Volgograd – August 24, 1986, Moscow), constructor.

Paternal grandfather – Konstantin Mikhailovich Apryatin, participated in World War I, in 1916 was awarded the Order of St. Stanislaus, 3rd degree, in the 1920s was a major trader. In 1928, he was deprived of voting rights, arrested, and exiled for engaging in trade and owning a store in Buynaksk. In 1928, he was arrested, and on January 14, 1929, by a decision of the OGPU Collegium, he was sentenced to execution for "counter-revolutionary activities" (Article 58/12 of the Criminal Code of the RSFSR). All members of his family were deprived of voting rights.

Paternal grandmother – Olga Vasilyevna Apryatina (née Pokrovskaya), was deprived of voting rights in 1927.

Konstantin Apryatin is a distant relative of Semyon Semyonovich Apryatkin.
