= Migunov =

Migunov (Russian: Мигунов) is a Russian masculine surname, its feminine counterpart is Migunova. It may refer to

- Petr Migunov (born 1974), Russian opera singer
- Yelena Migunova (born 1984), Russian sprinter
- Yevgeniy Migunov (1921–2004), Russian artist, animator and cartoonist
