= Little Octobrists =

Soviet Union children's organization

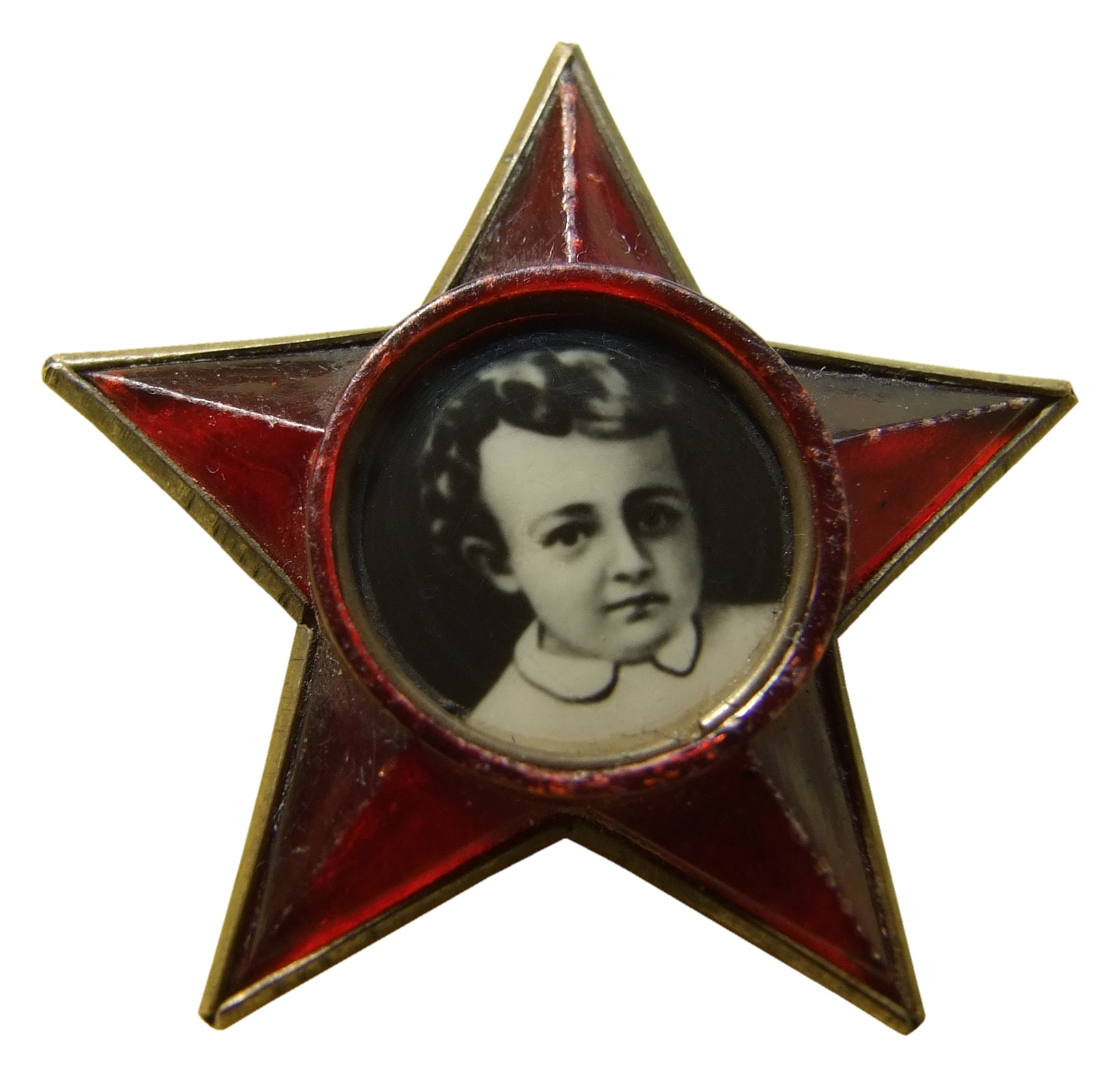
Badge with an older design, representing Lenin as a young child

Little Octobrists (Russian: октября́та, romanized: oktyabryata; singular, Russian: октябрёнок, romanized: oktyabryonok) was a youth organization for elementary school children in grades 1 through 3 in the Soviet Union. After the age of nine, in the 3rd grade, Little Octobrists would typically join the Young Pioneer organization.

Little Octobrists were organized in groups each representing one school grade level. The group was divided into subgroups called little stars (Russian: звёздочки, romanized: zvyozdochki), of five children each. Each group of Little Octobrists was under the leadership of one Young Pioneer from the Young Pioneer detachment. Every Little Octobrist wore a ruby-coloured five-pointed star badge with the portrait of Vladimir Lenin in his childhood. The symbol of the group was the little red flag.

== Description ==
On July 18, 1924, the VI Congress of the RLKSM wrote in its resolution "On the organizational development of children's groups": "... it is possible for the communist movement to cover younger children, 8-11 years old, by creating a junior branch of the children's communist movement."

The term "Octobrists" appeared in 1923–1924, when the first groups of children began to appear in Moscow, into which children of the same age as the Great October Socialist Revolution were admitted.

The same resolution of the VI Congress of the RLKSM established the structure of the October organization: a group of Octobrists of 25 children organized under the pioneer detachment was divided into links of 5 people (later the links began to be called stars and their size was now expanded into 7-10 children; according to the regulations on the All-Union Pioneer Organization (1957) - reduced to up to 8 people; in acccordance with Regulations on the All-Union Pioneer Organization (1967) - reduced to just 5-6). The group is led by a Komsomol member allocated by the RLKSM cell and who is an assistant to the leader of the pioneer detachment. The pioneers are in charge of the squads, and October assistants are selected to help the pioneers. There was a group council, which consisted of its leader, link leaders and their assistants, that is, an Octobrist could only be an assistant linkman and an ordinary member of the group board. In 1957, squad leaders were now to be drawn from the ranks of the Octobrists.

Groups of Octobrists were created in the first grades of schools and operated until the Octobrists were promoted to Pioneers and the formation of pioneer detachments in the higher grades. Initially, after joining the ranks of the Octobrists, children wore a red star sewn on their shirt, on their left chest. issue a badge - a five-pointed ruby star with a portrait of Lenin as a child. The group's symbol was the plain red flag, a symbol of the events of 1917.

The group (in some schools - a detachment) of the Octobrists consisted of several units, called "stars", each of which usually included 5 children - the symbol of a five-pointed star. The principle of creating a detachment of Octobrists was simple: a detachment is a school class. As a rule, in the "star" every October, he held one of the "positions" - the commander of the "star", florist, orderly, librarian, political informer, or sportsman. In some schools, the commander of the "star", at the request of the teachers, sewed a stripe on the sleeve of his tunic (squad leader - 2 stripes).

The activities of the Octobrists took place mainly in a playful way and were organized by teachers and counselors. The All-Union October Week was held annually on April 16–22. At the school for the Octobrists, "Lenin's readings" could be organized, when on the 22nd of each month the appointed senior pupil came to the class and read stories about V.I. Lenin (his birthday was April 22, 1870).

== Printed editions ==
All-Union magazines (Vesyolye Kartinki and Murzilka for preschool age and elementary grades, Koster, Young Technician and Young Naturalist for pre-pioneer and pioneer age) and republican magazines were published for the Octobrists. For example, in the Moldavian SSR the magazine "Steluza" ("Star") was published in the Moldavian and Russian languages, in the Estonian SSR the magazines Täheke ("Star") and Pioneer were published in Estonian. The magazine "Barvinok" was published in Kiev in Russian and Ukrainian. Various pioneer newspapers also published materials intended for the Octobrists.

Annually for the Octobrists, the Malysh publishing house issued the Zvezdochka desk calendar. Methodological materials on work with October were regularly published in the journals "Vozhaty", "Elementary School", "Education of Schoolchildren".

== Age hierarchy of communist youth organizations in the Soviet Union ==
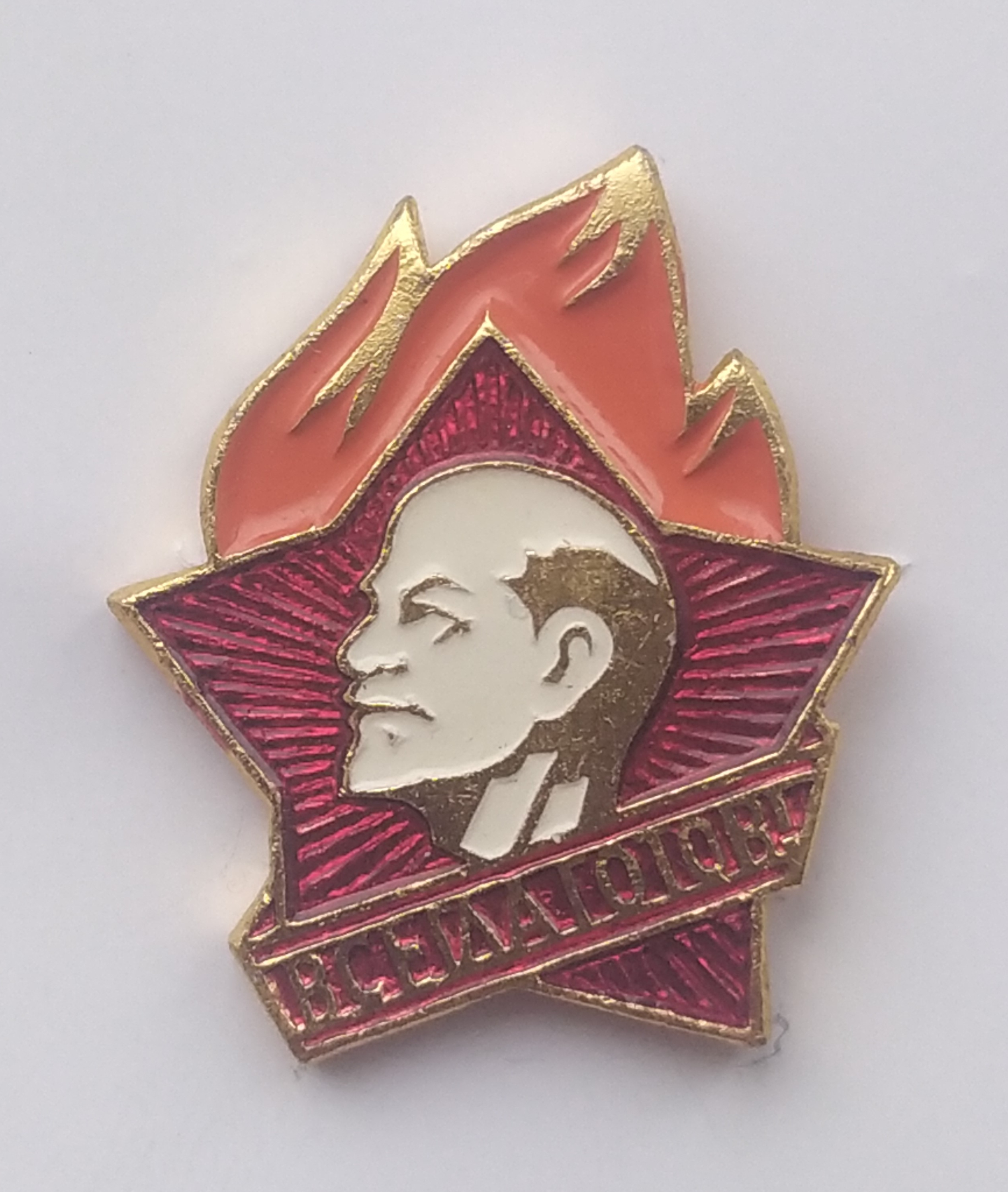
Pioneer badge (USSR)

Little Octobrists - primary school students - children aged 7 to 9; (Octobrists were admitted as pioneers in the third grade, excellent students - in the fall, around October 29 or November 7, the rest - in the spring, around April 22.

Pioneers - middle school students (grades 3–4 to 8) - adolescents aged 8 to 15; (Pioneers were accepted into the Komsomol from the age of 14, those who were not accepted into the Komsomol, upon reaching the age of 15, automatically ceased to be pioneers)

Komsomol members - youth aged 14 to 28; with top leadership permitted to stay in Komsomol beyond 28 years.

== See also ==
- Cub Scout – equivalent in mainstream Scouting
- Komsomol
- Murzilka
- Union of Communist Youth
