= Irina Tokmakova =

Soviet and Russian writer

- Born: Irina Petrovna Manukova; 3 March 1929; Moscow, Russian SSR, Soviet Union
- Died: 5 April 2018 (aged 89); Moscow, Russia
- Occupations: Novelist, translator
- Spouse: Leo Tokmakov (1 child)

Irina Petrovna Tokmakova (née Manukova, 3 March 1929 — 5 April 2018) was a Soviet and Russian writer of children's books, a poet, playwright, and a translator of classic children's literature into Russian. Her translations of Tove Jansson, Astrid Lindgren and Kenneth Grahame's works were particularly renowned. She was a laureate of the State Prize of the Russian Federation for children's literature, and the Alexander Grin literary prize.

== Life ==
Irina Tokmakova was born in Moscow to Perch Manukian (an Armenian, whose Russified name was Pyotr Manukov), an electrical engineer, and Lidia Diligenskaya, a paediatrician at a local orphanage.

During the Second World War, she and her sister were sent to Penza to stay with relatives. For a while, there was no news from her parents, but some time later, her mother's orphanage was evacuated to Penza, and her parents were able to join her. They lived in Penza till 1943, after which they returned to Moscow, where the orphanage was re-established.

Manukova graduated from high school with a gold medal in 1948. She had been writing poetry from her childhood onwards, but feeling that she lacked a literary talent, she decided to take up a career in languages. In 1953, she graduated from the philological department of the Moscow State University. She then entered a postgraduate programme in general and comparative linguistics, and began to work as an interpreter.

Manukova married Leo Tokmakov, an illustrator. Their son, Vasily Tokmakov, also became a writer of children's fiction.

== Death ==
Irina Tokmakova died in Moscow on 5 April 2018.

== Career ==
The first literary translation into Russian undertaken by Tokmakova was a collection of Swedish folk songs for children. These had been sent to her by a visiting Swedish energy executive named Borgqvist, who had recognised her love for Swedish song. Initially, the translation was meant for her son, but Tokmakova's husband took it to a publishing house, which then printed it in the magazines Merry Pictures and Murzilka.

The writers Samuil Marshak and Agniya Barto saw Tokmakova's works in Murzilka and encouraged her to write and publish more. Subsequently, Leo Tokmakov illustrated many of their books.

To join the Union of Soviet Writers, Tokmakova needed sponsorships from three members; Marshak, Boris Zakhoder and Valentin Berestov recommended her.

Her first book of poetry, illustrated by Leo Tokmakov and published in 1962, was titled Trees.

Tokmakova was able to travel abroad to attend international seminars and conferences on children's literature. She was a juror for the Hans Christian Andersen Award.

== Selected works ==
=== Own writings ===
- Времена года. 1962.
- Сосны шумят. 1966.
- Токмакова, Ирина (1968). Аля, Кляксич и буква "А". Махаон. ISBN 978-5-389-00432-0.
- Далеко — Нигерия. 1975.
- Может, нуль не виноват?. 1984. ISBN 978-5-91045-901-8.
- Токмакова, Ирина (1986). И настанет веселое утро. Ėnas-Kniga. ISBN 978-5-91921-335-2.
- Счастливо, Ивушкин. 1991. ISBN 978-5-699-60999-4.

=== Translations ===
==== From English ====
- Lewis Carroll (January 1979). Alice in Wonderland [Алиса в волшебной стране].
- Kenneth Grahame. The Wind in the Willows [Ветер в ивах].
- A.A. Milne (1976). Winnie-the-Pooh [Винни-Пух и его друзья].
- James Barrie (1991). Peter Pan [Питер и Венди].

==== From Swedish ====
- Tove Jansson. Småtrollen och den stora översvämningen [Маленькие тролли и большое наводнение].
- Selma Lagerlöf (1907). Nils Holgerssons underbara resa genom Sverige [Чудесное путешествие Нильса с дикими гусями].
- Astrid Lindgren. Mio, min Mio [Мио, мой Мио].

==== From Uzbek ====
- R. Abdurashid. Grandmother story [Бабушка-сказка].
