= Yevgeniy Migunov =

Soviet artist (1921–2004)

Yevgeny Migunov
- Yevgeny Migunov, self-portrait
- Born: Yevgeny Tikhonovich Migunov; 27 February 1921; Moscow, USSR
- Died: 1 January 2004 (aged 82); Moscow, Russia
- Occupations: Animator, artist

Yevgeny Tikhonovich Migunov (Russian: Евгений Тихонович Мигунов; February 27, 1921 — January 1, 2004) was a Russian artist, cartoonist, book illustrator, animation and art director, screenwriter, inventor, educator and memoirist. He is regarded as one of the leading innovators during the Khrushchev Thaw who contributed significantly to both traditional and stop motion animation.

== Early years ==
Yevgeny and his sister Nina were born in Moscow into a family of Tikhon Grigorievich Migunov, a low-ranking official in one of the ministries, and Maria Konstantinovna Migunova. Yevgeny was diagnosed with cerebral palsy of his left leg and remained lame throughout his life, hiding it and compensating by various activities. His mother blamed obstetrician for hitting the nerve. Following her sudden death in 1928 Tikhon Migunov married her sister, Zinaida.

In 1928 Migunov graduated from the P. N. Lepeshinsky Experimental School-Commune and spent a year at the art school. In 1939 he entered the newly-founded Art Faculty at VGIK as one of the four students of the first official Russian animation workshop headed by Ivan Ivanov-Vano. Besides Ivanov-Vano his teachers were Fyodor Bogorodsky and Fyodor Konstantinov. He had a hard time following the programme and learned art by studying paintings by classical Russian artists. He also learned a lot from his classmate, close friend and future collaborator Anatoly Sazonov who came from an artistic family and whose talent he highly regarded. Migunov gained money by drawing miniatures for the Novodevichy Convent Museum.

With the start of the Great Patriotic War in 1941 he joined the volunteer corps of the 38th rifle regiment of the 13th Rostokino division along with the fellow students, hiding his disability. He was awarded the 2nd Class Order of the Patriotic War in 1987. In Autumn they returned to VGIK, but with the start of the Battle of Moscow it was evacuated to Alma-Ata along with Mosfilm and Lenfilm. They continued the studies, conducted art exhibitions and developed cartoons. In 1943 Migunov defended his diploma — a Let's Laugh storyboard based on his own original screenplay in verse. The commission was headed by Sergei Eisenstein.

== Animation ==
=== After the war ===
In September 1943 VGIK returned to Moscow. Same year Migunov and his classmates joined Soyuzmultfilm and finished their first cartoon — Stolen Sun (considered lost today). In 1945 Migunov and Sazonov worked as art directors on the first traditionally animated Soviet feature The Lost Letter by the Brumberg sisters. In 1946 they helped Mstislav Paschenko to restore The Song of Happiness short from scratch. It became the first Soyuzmultfilm work to receive an international award (a bronze medal for the best animated film and a special award "For Humaneness" at the 8th Venice International Film Festival).

Migunov also developed educational and methodological programme for animation courses under Soyuzmultfilm and taught character design. The 1948 release of the short comedy film Champion with art direction by Migunov was the first ever cartoon where oil paints were used for backgrounds. It also marked the start of the Cold War anti-Disney campaign, being accused of "formalism" and "anthropomorphism". Migunov vindictively drew his next film Polkan and Shavka as realistic as possible, and to his surprise it became "a golden standard" for the next ten years.

In 1951 the short When New Year Trees Light Up directed by Paschenko, with art direction by Migunov, was chosen as the best children's movie at the 7th Karlovy Vary International Film Festival (it competed against feature motion pictures). Following years Migunov turned into one of the leading innovators at Soyuzmultfilm.

=== Khrushchev Thaw ===
In 1953 a puppet division was relaunched at Soyuzmultfilm. Next year Migunov made his directorial debut with the first post-war stop motion animated film Karandash and Klyaksa — Merry Hunters inspired by the popular Russian clown Karandash and his dog. He basically reinvented the whole production process by designing a device for shooting in statics, with a horizontally moving camera and attachable ball-jointed dolls. He also suggested to use latex for puppet faces. Together with the mechanic Semyon Etlis they organized technical base, constructed and patented all devices which have been used by directors ever since. Migunov also wrote the screenplay and did the singing part since Mikhail Rumyantsev (Karandash) claimed he had no ear for music. The film turned very successful, and a sequel was in plans when Rumyantsev suddenly filled a complain letter, claiming he wasn't attached to do the voiceover. Migunov then left puppet animation.

In 1957 he directed a traditionally animated short Familiar Pictures based on the sketches by a stand-up comedian Arkady Raikin who also made an appearance. It became the first radical shift from "realistic" animation towards magazine caricatures due to Raikin's satire which didn't fit the art direction of that time. It wasn't long until other animators followed the example, developing their own distinctive styles.

Among Migunov's unreleased projects was the first Soviet satirical animated anthology series Dyatel (Woodpecker) where he implemented cutout animation, split screen and other experimental techniques; it later served as a bases for Fitil and Happy Merry-Go-Round. The screenplay for World! World! World!!! was approved in 1959, but also didn't air. According to the film historian Georgy Borodin, it was a principally new approach to auteur animation tried only years later.

By 1960 his relationship with the studio management escalated. His last project based on two poems by Vladimir Mayakovsky led to a scandal: it was presented as a storyboard with the director's screenplay written in the margins which was against the rules. Migunov lost his temper and was immediately fired from Soyuzmultfilm.

== Illustrator ==
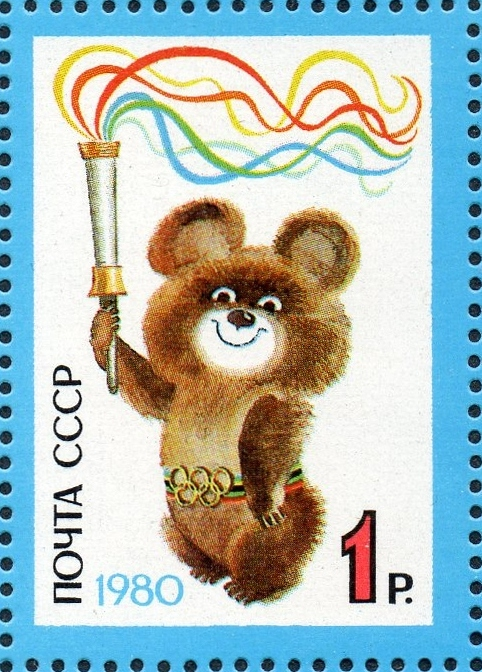
Misha holding a torch on a stamp

After Migunov left animation, he focused on art and illustrations. He produced filmstrips for the Diafilm studio, drew cartoons and caricatures for the Krokodil satirical magazine, as well as children's magazines Murzilka, Merry Pictures, Pioneer and newspapers such as Vechernyaya Moskva, Pravda and Literaturnaya Gazeta.

He also spent many years working at the Detskaya Literatura publishing house, illustrating children's books and fantasy novels. He used his animation experience to create a distinctive "motion blur" effect in his works. Among his major achievements are illustrations to Strugatsky Brothers' Monday Begins on Saturday and The Tale of the Troika, Aleksandr Volkov's Emerald City novels, Yevgeny Veltistov's Electronic: A Boy From a Suitcase and — most famously — Kir Bulychov's Alisa Selezneva series. Their collaboration lasted for almost 40 years, Migunov was even credited with several ideas for Bulychov's novels. In 1980 Roman Kachanov invited him to work as an art director on The Mystery of the Third Planet (an adaptation of Alisa Selezneva's adventures), but Migunov rejected and later claimed that some of the cartoon characters were copies of his illustrations.

Yevgeny was also among the designers of Misha, the Russian Bear mascot of the 1980 Summer Olympics in Moscow. After Victor Chizhikov finished the main sketch, Migunov prepared 21 series of images for artists, designers and advertisers. They utilized many different artistic techniques and featured Misha greeting guests, holding the Olympic torch and taking part in various sport disciplines.

== Last years and death ==
Since 1997 Migunov had been working on Kir Bulychov's collection of works. He prepared hundreds of illustrations and sketches, yet the project resulted in two thin books, and many drawings were left unpublished. In 1999 he survived a stroke and lost ability to draw, but remained in control of the coloring process. He also left many notebooks with memoirs about his youth, the people he had encountered, theoretical notes and essays on art and animation. He called them his "major life accomplishment" and expressed hope that they wouldn't be lost. To this day they've been only partly published by several film-related magazines and blogs.

Yevgeny Migunov died on 1 January 2004 and was buried at the Miusskoye cemetery in Moscow. He was survived by his wife Nina Romanovna Karavaeva (married since 1945), also an animator at Soyuzmultfilm who left the studio along with him, and her daughter from the first marriage Elena Nikolaevna Zarubina.

== Filmography ==
- Actress (1942) - opening sequence (uncredited)
- Stolen Sun (1943) – art director
- The Lost Letter (1945) – art director
- Winter Tale (1945) – art director
- The Song of Happiness (1946) – art director
- Merry Garden (1947) – art director
- Quartet (1947) - art director
- Champion (1948) - art director
- An Elephant and an Ant (1948) – art director
- Polkan and Shavka (1949) – art director
- Mister Wolk (1949) – consultant (uncredited)
- When New Year Trees Light Up (1950)
- A Grandpa and a Grandsonny (1950) - art director
- Who's First? (1950) - art director
- Forest Adventurers (1951) - art director
- Magic Shop (1953) - art director
- Karandash and Klyaksa — Merry Hunters (1954) – director, art director, screenwriter, voice
- A Pipe and a Bear (1955) - art director
- What Kind of Bird Is This? (1955) - director, art director, songwriter
- Familiar Pictures (1957) - director, art director
- To the 6th World Festival (1957) – director, art director, screenwriter
- A Song About Friendship (1957) – art director
- Poem of the Sea (1958) – director, art director (animated sequences)
- Exactly at Three Fifteen... (1959) – director, art director, screenwriter
- Oversalted (1959) – screenwriter
- World! World! World!!! (1959) – screenwriter (unfinished)
- S. Marshak (1960) – director (animated sequences)

== See also ==
- History of Russian animation
