= Yevgeny Veltistov =

Soviet writer

- Born: July 21, 1934
- Died: September 1, 1989 (aged 55)
- Occupations: Screenwriter, novelist
- Writing career
- Genre: Science fiction

Yevgeny Serafimovich Veltistov (Russian:Евге́ний Серафи́мович Велти́стов) (1934–1989) was a Soviet writer, screenwriter, and journalist. He is best known as the writer of a series of novels and a television film about the humanoid boy-robot Elektronik. He was a Laureate of the State Prize of the USSR (1982).

== Biography ==
Veltistov was born on 21 July 1934 in Moscow. He graduated from the Faculty of Journalism at Moscow State University and worked in the press and at the Central Committee of the CPSU. He became a member of the Writers' Union in 1966. He was one of the founders of the audio magazine Krugozor in 1963, and became its second editor-in-chief in the 1970s.

He was first published in the late 1950s. In 1960, he published his first science-fiction novel, The Adventures of the bottom of the sea.

Veltistov is best-known for being the lead author of a Soviet children's science fiction series about the boy-robot Elektronik, or Electronic. Elektronik is a humanoid robot of great processing power but lacking emotion, physically modelled on a student named Sergei Syroezhkin, who also appears as a character. The first novel in the series, Electronic - the Boy from the Suitcase, illustrated by Yevgeniy Migunov, was published in 1964. Other novels about Elektronik include Ressi - elusive friend (1970, 1971), Victor of the Impossible (1975), and The New Adventures of Electronic (1984, rerelease 1988). In 1979, Elektronik's adventures were adapted into a television film, The Adventures of Elektronik, scripted by Veltistov and directed by Konstantin Bromberg, which was awarded the USSR State Prize in 1982. The film, featuring identical twins as Elektronik and Sergei, has become a much-watched classic in the former Soviet Union, and is nowadays often seen as a prophetic and optimistic commentary on Artificial intelligence.

Veltistov's other works for children include the story of a dead end that grants fantastic wishes, Gum-Gam (1970, filmed in 1985), and two collections of stories, A million and a day Holiday (1979) and Class and extracurricular adventures extraordinary graders (1985).

His adult science fiction works include the story of the near future - Sip of the Sun, Notes of programmer Snegova March (1967), which tells of the arrival in the Solar System of an alien computer controlled spaceship, and the novel The Nocturne emptiness (1988), describing the conspiracy of the imperialists that threaten humanity with climate war, previously published along with the story in a single volume, Nocturne emptiness. A breath of the Sun (1982).

== Bibliography ==
=== Selected novels ===
- Electronic - the Boy from the Suitcase (Электроник — мальчик из чемодана., 1964), Publisher: Fredonia Books, 2003, ISBN 1410101681
- Gum-Gam (Гум-Гам) 1970
- A million and a day Holiday (Миллион и один день каникул) (1979)
- Nocturne emptiness. A breath of the Sun (Ноктюрн пустоты. Глоток солнца.) (1982).
