= Elena Mayorova =

Soviet and Russian actress

- Born: 30 May 1958; Yuzhno-Sakhalinsk, RSFSR, USSR
- Died: 23 August 1997 (aged 39); Moscow, Russia
- Occupation: Actress
- Years active: 1980-1997

Elena Vladimirovna Mayorova (Russian: Еле́на Влади́мировна Майо́рова; 30 May 1958 – 23 August 1997) was a Soviet and Russian film and stage actress, Honored Artist of the RSFSR (1989).

== Biography ==
Her father worked in the depot, and her mother in a factory.

At school, Elena worked with the third class in the Pioneers Palace Theatre Studio. After graduation, Elena Mayorova tried to get into a theater class at a few universities, but was not accepted. One year she had to study in vocational school building, she graduated with honors and received specialty. In 1976, Elena Mayorova entered Russian Academy of Theatre Arts, the course of Oleg Tabakov.

In 1982-1983, after graduating from GITIS, she played in the Sovremennik Theatre. Since 1983 Elena Mayorova actress Moscow Art Theater of the USSR. Gorky, and after its separation in 1987 Moscow Art Theatre Anton Chekhov. She had her first role in Could One Imagine? directed by Ilya Frez.

Elena Mayorova died under tragic circumstances; the official version is of an accident, although some say suicidal. Accidentally or intentionally, she set fire to her dress while on a staircase in the entrance of the house. With burns 85% of body surface actress was admitted to the Sklifosovsky Institute, where she died. She was buried at the cemetery Troyekurovskoye Cemetery.

== Personal life ==
- First husband a fellow student of GITIS Vladimir Chaplygin.
- Second husband the painter-hyperrealist Sergey Sherstuk (1951-1998), survived his wife for exactly 9 months, died of cancer on May 23, 1998.

No children.

== Filmography ==
- 1980 — An Uninvited Friend
- 1981 — Could One Imagine?
- 1981 — Express on Fire
- 1981 — Our Vocation
- 1982 — Whose You, Old Man?
- 1983 — Offered for Singles
- 1983 — The Last Argument of Kings
- 1984 — Parade of Planets
- 1984 — Alone and Unarmed
- 1986 — I Counselor Outpost
- 1986 — Zina-Zinulya
- 1987 — Forgotten Melody for a Flute
- 1987 — Lucky
- 1988 — Two and One
- 1988 — Fast Train (Prize for Best Actress at the Constellation Film Festival)
- 1989 — Was there Carotene?
- 1991 — Lost in Siberia
- 1993 — Makarov
- 1993 — Cloak Casanova
- 1995 — Little Demon
- 1996 — The Return of Battleship
- 1996 — Career of Arturo Ui. A New Version.
- 1998 — At Loggerheads
- 1998 — Chekhov and Co
- 1999 — Listen, If Rain Does Not Go...
