= Monday Begins on Saturday =

1965 novel by Arkady and Boris Strugatsky

Cover of the first edition.

Monday Begins on Saturday (Russian: Понедельник начинается в субботу) is a 1965 satirical science fantasy novel by Soviet writers Boris and Arkady Strugatsky, with illustrations by Yevgeniy Migunov. Set in a fictional town in northwestern Russia, where research in magic occurs, the novel is a satire of Soviet scientific research institutes. It offers an idealistic view of the scientific work ethic, as reflected in the title which suggests that the scientists' weekends are nonexistent. Their idealism is contrasted by inept bureaucrats and a dishonest, show-horse professor.

The "Scientific Research Institute of Sorcery and Wizardry" (or, in Andrew Bromfield's 2002 translation "the National Institute for the Technology of Witchcraft and Thaumaturgy", abbreviated to "NITWITT"), located in the fictional Northern Russian town of Solovets, is portrayed as a place where everyone either works diligently, or else their loss of honesty is symbolized by their ears becoming more and more hairy. These hairy-eared people are viewed with disdain by the idealistic scientists. The more morally backward specimens are the most self-aggrandizing and sure of their own significance, while conducting the more ridiculous and nonsensical pseudo-research, to justify their position.

It has a sequel, Tale of the Troika, a much more grotesque satire, which describes Soviet bureaucracy at its worst and features many of the same characters.

== Characters and events ==
The novel is written from the point of view of Aleksandr Ivanovich Privalov (usually called Sasha), a young programmer from Leningrad, who picks up two hitchhikers during a road trip north through Karelia. After the two find out that he is a programmer, they convince him to stay in Solovets and work together with them in the Scientific Research Institute of Sorcery and Wizardry (abbreviated NIIChaVo in Russian, which sounds very close to "Ничего", the word for "nothing").

The book contains a large number of references to well-known Russian fairy tales and children's stories: Baba Yaga makes an appearance as do Zmey Gorynych and the Learned Cat from Pushkin's Ruslan and Ludmila. Some figures from lore and history also appear, such as genies and Cain. The authors portray these persons and concepts (such as magic) either as objects of scientific inquiry or members of the institute. Merlin, for example, is described as an incompetent boaster and is in charge of the institute's Department of Predictions. The Technical Helpdesk is headed by one Sabaoth Baalovich Odin, also described as the most powerful wizard in the universe, while the vivarium is staffed by Alfred, a vampire.

The novel has other colorful characters. For example, Cristóbal Josevich Junta was formerly a Grand Inquisitor, and is now the head of the Department of the Meaning of Life. He is also a talented taxidermist. It is rumored that his collection includes an SS-Standartenführer, an erstwhile friend of Junta's and also a taxidermist. Cristóbal Josevich, so goes the rumor, was equally skilled, only faster. Fyodor Simeonovich Kivrin, the head of the Department of Linear Happiness, is a stuttering big guy, an eternal optimist, an apprentice programmer, a fan of Erle Stanley Gardner, and a mentor of sorts to Privalov. Modest Matveevich Kamnoedov (whose surname translates to "stone-eater") is an archetypal administrator and bureaucrat who does not understand the "Monday begins on Saturday" work ethic. On New Year's Eve, he directs Privalov to turn off the lights and lock all doors, but Privalov soon finds out that everyone is still at the Institute and research continues.

Some action centers on the laboratory of Amvrosiy Ambroisovich Vybegallo, a professor whose gargantuan experiments are spectacularly wasteful and crowd-pleasing but utterly unscientific. In his quest for an "ideal man" he creates a model of "partially satisfied man" which eats inordinate amounts of raw offal achieving ever shortening periods of lethargic "full satisfaction", until it begins eating without ever stopping and eventually bursts, literally. On a New Year's Day Vybegallo hatches up his ultimate creation, a "model of a completely satisfied man" who can instantly satisfy all of his wants. Immediately upon hatching the model attempts to consume the whole universe, but Roman Oyra-Oyra manages to stop him by throwing at him a genie in a bottle.

The final part of the book solves the mystery of Janus Poluektovich Nevstruev, the director of the institute, who is known to be one man in two personas, called A-Janus and U-Janus.

== Translations ==
The first English translation was published by DAW Books in 1977.

In August 2005, Seagull Publishing, London, published a translation by Andrew Bromfield titled Monday Starts on Saturday (ISBN 978-0954336820). The publisher described it as "the Russian equivalent of Harry Potter, written 40 years earlier". The book features illustrations by Evgeny Migunov, one of the best illustrators of the works of the Strugatsky brothers.

== Puns and hints ==
- The Russian language abbreviation for the institute, NIICHAVO, sounds like a colloquial pronunciation for the word "nichevo" ("it doesn't matter" or "nothing"). In the English translation by Andrew Bromfield, the name of the institute has been translated as NITWITT (National Institute for the Technology of Witchcraft and Thaumaturgy).
- The place of "Solovets" hints at Solovetsky Islands, with their historical and mythological associations.
- "A-Janus and U-Janus" is a hint to Janus Bifrons. In Russian, the word "litso" means both "person" and "face" (hint to Janus).
- Vybegallo with his pseudo-commoner appearance and radical pseudoscientific ideas is a hint to Trofim Lysenko.

== Adaptations and influence ==
- In 1965, a TV play was staged, based on the book.
- Charodei (Sorcerers) TV film (1982) was initially written by Strugatskys as adaptation of the second part of the novel. But director Konstantin Bromberg turned down the script due to its serious tone and social commentary, and the Strugatskys had to rewrite their script as a light-hearted romantic comedy. As a result, the movie bore almost no resemblance to the book besides the similar setting and several characters' names.
- In 2015, Teterin Films studio has obtained the rights to adaptation, with plans to release a feature film based on the book. As of 2018, the project was still in development hell.
- The song "Allegry" from the album Коварство и любовь by the Soviet rock band Agatha Christie was taken from the novel, which is, in its turn, taken from the book Creativity of the mentally ill and its influence on the development of science, art and technology by Russian psychiatrist Pavel Karpov.

== Sources ==
- Byron Lindsey, "On the Strugackij Brothers’ Contemporary Fairytale Monday Begins of Saturday". Book chapter. "The Supernatural in Russian Literature". Editor: Amy Mandelker. Columbus: Slavica, 1988: 290–302.
