= Vera Vasilyeva =

Soviet and Russian actress (1925–2023)

- Вера Васильева
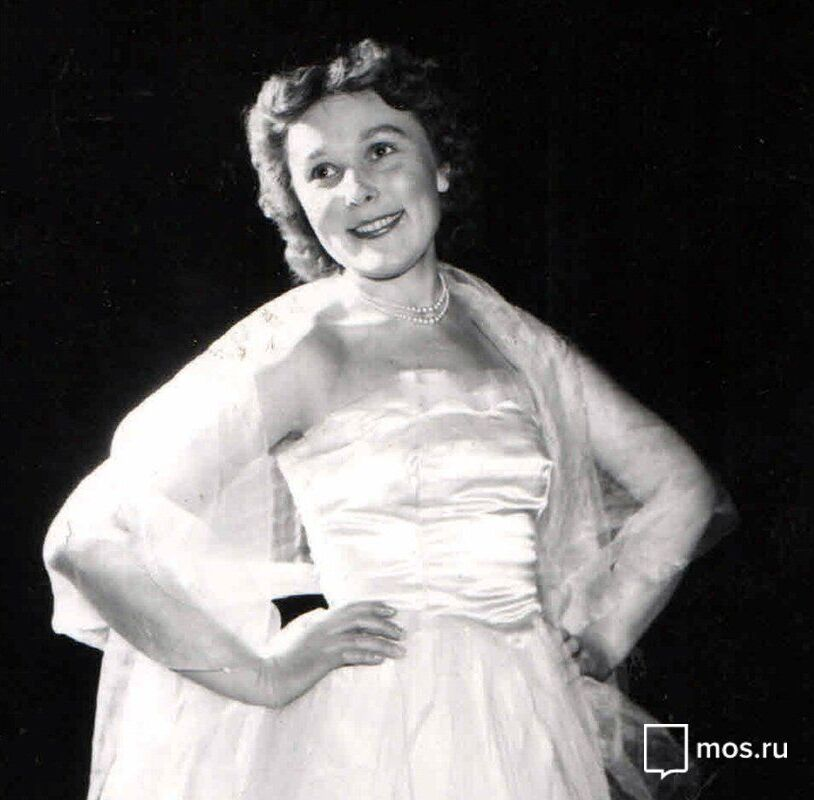
- Vasilyeva in 1956
- Born: Vera Kuzminichna Vasilyeva; 30 September 1925; Moscow, Russian SFSR, USSR
- Died: 8 August 2023 (aged 97); Moscow, Russia
- Occupation: Actress
- Spouse: Vladimir Ushakov (m. 1956; died 2011)

Vera Kuzminichna Vasilyeva (Russian: Ве́ра Кузьми́нична Васи́льева, 30 September 1925 – 8 August 2023) was a Soviet and Russian film and stage actress. In 1986, she was honored with the People's Artist of the USSR award. She was awarded the Stalin Prize twice, in 1948 and 1951. She is known for her roles in Bride with a Dowry (1953) and Adventures of a Dentist (1965).

== Career ==
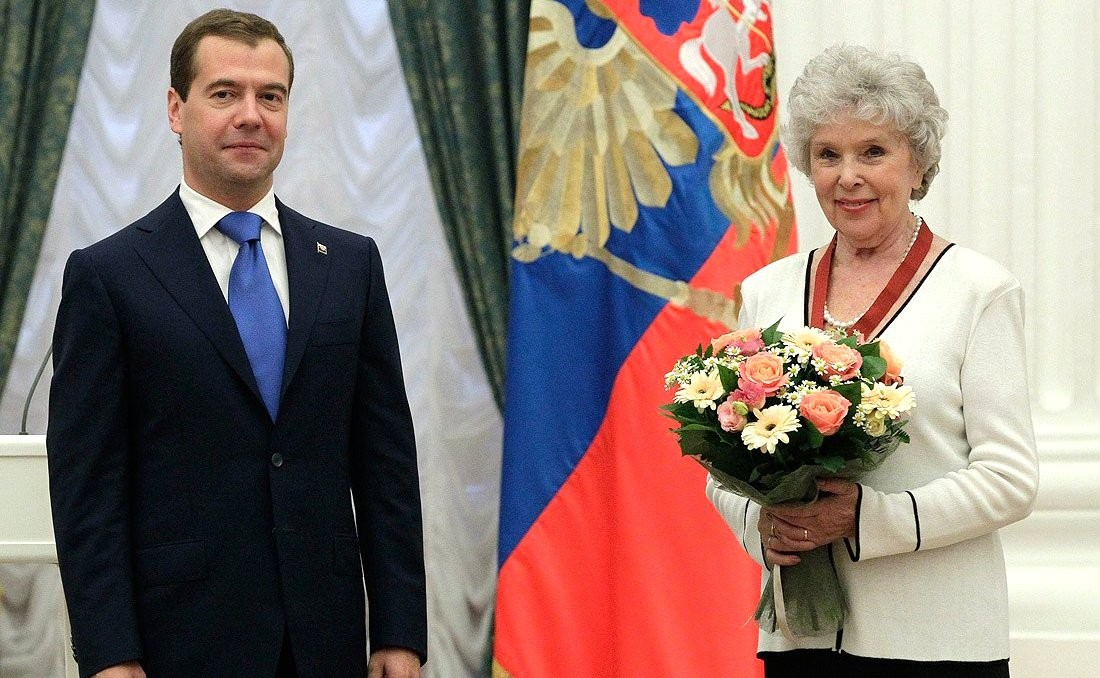
Russian President Dmitry Medvedev presentation of Order "For Merit to the Fatherland", 3rd class, 28 July 2011

In 1943, Vasilyeva entered the Moscow City Drama School, attending a course with Vladimir Gotovtsev.

In 1945, Vasilyeva made her cinema debut, appearing in a small role in The Call of Love. She received her first big role in 1947, playing the role of Anastasia Gusenkova in Ballad of Siberia.

== Personal life and death ==
Vasilyeva was born in Moscow. She was married to actor Vladimir Ushakov (1920–2011) from 1956 until his death in 2011. They had no children.

She died on 8 August 2023, at the age of 97.

== Selected filmography ==
- The Call of Love (1945) as fitter (uncredited)
- Ballad of Siberia (1947) as Anastasia Petrovna Gusenkova
- Bride with a Dowry (1953) as Olga Stepanovna Stepanova
- Chuk and Gek (1953) as Mother
- Adventures of a Dentist (1965) as Lyudmila Ivanovna Lastochkina
- Umka is Looking for a Friend (1970) as Mother bear (voice)
- We Didn't Learn This (1975) as Natalia Ivanovna
- The Age of Innocence (1976) as Polina Borisovna
- Adventures of Vasya Kurolesov (1981) as Vasya's mother (voice)
- Carnival (1981) as Nikita's mother
- Married Bachelor (1982) as Marya Semyonovna
- To Marry a Captain (1985) as Vera Semyonovna Zhuravlyova
- Dandelion Wine (1997) as Esther Spaulding
