= Crank from 5th B =

The Boy From 5B
- Russian: Чудак из пятого 'Б'
- Directed by: Ilya Frez
- Written by: Vladimir Zheleznikov
- Starring: Andrei Voynovsky; Roza Agisheva; Tatyana Pelttser; Nina Kornienko; Natalya Bespalova
- Cinematography: Aleksei Chardynin; Gasan Tutunov
- Music by: Yan Frenkel
- Release date: 1972
- Country: Soviet Union
- Language: Russian

The Boy From 5B (Russian: Чудак из пятого 'Б') is a 1972 Soviet teen comedy film directed by Ilya Frez. It was edited into three parts, given a narrative voiceover and shown on BBC 1 television in the UK on consecutive mornings during the 1978 Easter and 1979 and 1980 summer holidays.

== Plot ==
The schoolboy Borya becomes a first-class counselor and is gradually imbued with an interest in work.

== Cast ==
- Andrei Voynovsky
- Roza Agisheva
- Tatyana Pelttser as Grandmother
- Nina Kornienko
- Natalya Bespalova
- Nikolay Merzlikin
- Yelizaveta Auerbakh
- Yevgeniy Vesnik
- Yuliya Korneva
- Dmitry Sosnovsky
