= Charodei =

1982 television film by Konstantin Bromberg

- DVD cover
- Written by: Arkady Strugatsky; Boris Strugatsky
- Directed by: Konstantin Bromberg
- Starring: Aleksandra Yakovleva; Aleksandr Abdulov; Yekaterina Vasilyeva; Valentin Gaft; Yevgeny Vesnik; Valery Zolotukhin
- Music by: Yevgeni Krylatov
- Country of origin: Soviet Union
- Original language: Russian

Production
- Producer: Lyudmila Pozdnyakova
- Cinematography: Konstantin Opryatin
- Editor: Nadezhda Yavorskaya
- Running time: 160 minutes
- Production company: Odessa Film Studio

Original release
- Network: Soviet Central Television
- Release: 31 December 1982

Charodei (Russian: «Чародеи», lit. 'Enchanters, Sorcerers, Magicians', Ukrainian: «Чарівники») is a 1982 Soviet romantic fantasy musical comedy television film directed by Konstantin Bromberg. The film premiered on Soviet Central Television on 31 December 1982.

== Plot summary ==
Ivan Puhov (Abdulov) is in love with a very kind and friendly girl, Alyona (Yakovleva). Alyona works as a witch in a research institution that researches magic called NUINU (Scientific Universal Institute of Extraordinary Services, a NIICHAVO subsidiary in Kitezhgrad; for NIICHAVO see Monday Begins on Saturday). The couple are about to get married when Alyona's jealous and scheming co-worker, Sataneev (Gaft), tricks Alyona's boss, Kira Shemahanskaya (Vasilyeva), the institute director, into putting a spell on Alyona. The spell makes Alyona undergo a severe personality change, become unable to control her actions, and forget about Ivan. Alyona's colleagues, Viktor and Foma, notice a changes in her behavior and try to figure out a way to break the curse while simultaneously protecting the institution's latest research development, a magic wand.

== Cast ==
- Aleksandra Yakovleva as Alyona Igorevna Sanina "Alyonushka"
- Aleksandr Abdulov as Ivan Sergeevich Puhov "Ivanushka"
- Yekaterina Vasilyeva as Kira Anatolyevna Shemahanskaya (vocal by Zhanna Rozhdestvenskaya)
- Valentin Gaft as Apollon Mitrofanovich Sataneev
- Yevgeny Vesnik as chairman of the commission
- Valery Zolotukhin as Ivan Stepanovich Kivrin
- Emmanuil Vitorgan as Viktor Kovrov
- Mikhail Svetin as Foma Ostapovich Bryl
- Roman Filippov as Yuliy Tsezarevich Kamneyedov
- Anna Ashimova as Nina Puhova, Ivan's sister
- Semyon Farada as The Guest from South
- Leonid Kharitonov as Amatin, Ivan's boss

== Production ==
The film was initially written by brothers Boris and Arkady Strugatsky as adaptation of their 1965 science fantasy novel Monday Begins on Saturday. But Bromberg turned down the script due to its serious tone and social commentary, and the Strugatskys had to rewrite their script as a light-hearted romantic comedy. As a result, the movie bore almost no resemblance to the book besides the setting and several characters' names. History later repeated itself with another film by Sokurov Days of Eclipse (Dni zatmeniya).

The film became a classic Soviet New Year's Eve romantic comedy, similar to Irony of Fate (Ironiya sud'by) and The Carnival Night (Karnavalnaya noch).

== Film soundtrack ==
External videos
- Don't Believe What They Say ("Говорят, а ты не верь")

Film soundtrack includes many classical Soviet songs (some of them romantic), written by Yevgeni Krylatov and Leonid Derbenyov, including:

- "A woman's Enigma" (Russian: Загадка женщины) performed by Irina Otieva
- "Three White Horses" (Три белых коня) performed by Larisa Dolina
- "A Song About A Snowflake" (Песня о снежинке) performed by Olga Rozhdestvenskaya and VIA Dobrie Molodtsy
- "Witch-River" (Ведьма-речка) performed by Irina Otieva
- "A Song About a Suit" (Песенка про костюмчик) performed by Emmanuil Vitorgan and Mikhail Svetin
- "Imagine That" (Представь себе) performed by Aleksandr Abdulov
- "Time to Sleep" (Спать пора) performed by Mikhail Svetin
- "Serenade" (Серенада) performed by original cast members
- "Centaurs" (Кентавры) performed by Dobrie Molodtsy
- "By The Mirror" (Подойду я к зеркалу) performed by Zhanna Rozhdestvenskaya
- "You Can't Command Your Heart" (Только сердцу не прикажешь) performed by Zhanna Rozhdestvenskaya and Vladislav Lynkovskiy
- "Don't Believe What They Say" (Говорят, а ты не верь) performed by original cast members

Music performance by State Symphony Orchestra of Cinematography of the USSR.
