= Vasyok Trubachyov and His Comrades =

Vasyok Trubachyov and His Comrades (Film)
- Russian: Васёк Трубачёв и его товарищи
- Directed by: Ilya Frez
- Written by: Valentina Oseyeva; Boris Starshov
- Starring: Oleg Vishnev; Aleksandr Chudakov; Vladimir Semenovich
- Cinematography: Militsa Bogatkova
- Edited by: Bertha Pogrebinskaya
- Music by: Mikhail Ziv
- Production company: Gorky Film Studio
- Release date: 1955
- Running time: 82 min
- Country: Soviet Union
- Language: Russian

Vasyok Trubachyov and His Comrades (Russian: Васёк Трубачёв и его товарищи, romanized: Vasyok Trubachyov i yego tovarishchi) is a 1955 Soviet children's adventure film directed by Ilya Frez.

== Plot ==
The film shows the life of schoolchildren from the USSR on the eve of the Great Patriotic War, the film tells how easily a friend can become an adversary.

== Cast ==
- Oleg Vishnev as Vasyok Trubachyov
- Aleksandr Chudakov as Kolya Odintsov
- Vladimir Semenovich as Sasha Bulgakov
- Vyacheslav Devkin as Mazin
- Georgi Aleksandrov as Rusakov
- Natalya Rychagova as Nyura Sinitsyna
- Valeri Safarbekov as Malyutin
- Yury Bashkirov as Medvedev
- Yury Bogolyubov as teacher
- Leonid Kharitonov as Burtsev
- Ivan Pelttser as school watchman
- Anastasia Zuyeva as Aunt Dunya
- Pyotr Aleynikov as Rusakov's father
- Yury Medvedev as Trubachyov's father
- Kirill Lavrov as stonemason

== See also ==
- Trubachyov's Detachment Is Fighting (1957)
