= Quarantine (1983 film) =

1983 Soviet children's comedy film

- French film poster
- Directed by: Ilya Frez
- Written by: Galina Scherbakova
- Starring: Ailika Kremer; Yevgeniya Simonova; Yuri Duvanov; Svetlana Nemolyaeva
- Cinematography: Andrei Kirillov
- Music by: Alexey Rybnikov
- Production company: Gorky Film Studio
- Release date: 1983
- Running time: 76 minutes
- Country: Soviet Union
- Language: Russian

Quarantine (Russian: Карантин, romanized: Karantin) is a 1983 Soviet children's comedy film directed by Ilya Frez.

When a quarantine disrupts her first day of kindergarten, spirited five-year-old Masha embarks on a series of whimsical adventures around her village, forming unexpected bonds with her neighbors and discovering the small wonders of her world.

== Plot ==
The story follows young Masha over several days as she navigates an unexpected quarantine instead of attending her first day of kindergarten. On the first day, after a chaotic bus ride with her father, they discover her kindergarten is closed. Masha is taken to various caretakers throughout her extended family and community, including her aunt Katya at her father's work, and then to a museum, where she's entrusted to behave. Each day brings new interactions: her grandmother brings her to meet a friend, her grandfather takes her to his workplace, and each caretaker has their own unique approach to keeping her entertained. Her days include dreams about historical figures and whimsical adventures with neighborhood children, like Dima, with whom she forms a special bond despite frequent separations.

As the quarantine stretches on, Masha's days grow wilder. She plays unsupervised with Dima, finding herself in minor mischief and encounters with various adults—from a kindly woman who takes them to a cafe, to a concerned passerby when she gets momentarily lost. On the last day, Masha returns to kindergarten, reuniting with Dima and affirming their budding friendship with a heartfelt promise to stay friends “forever.” The story paints a warm, episodic portrait of Masha's community, capturing both the innocence and small dramas of childhood as Masha grows through her days with curiosity, wonder, and a little mischief.

== Cast ==
- Ailika Kremer as Masha
- Yevgeniya Simonova as mother
- Yuri Duvanov as father
- Svetlana Nemolyaeva as grandmother
- Yuri Bogatyryov as grandfather
- Tatyana Pelttser as great-grandmother
- Pavel Kadochnikov as great-grandfather
- Aleksandr Pashutin as colleague of the grandmother
- Lidiya Fedoseyeva-Shukshina as circus cashier
- Yelena Solovey as Fyokla
- Nina Arkhipova as Aunt Polina
- Lyubov Sokolova as Aunt Katya
- Vladimir Antonik as Aspidov
- Yevgeny Karelskikh as friend of Aspidov
- Maria Skvortsova as nurse
- Zinaida Naryshkina as "Shapoklyak"
- Sergei Plotnikov as "Leo Tolstoy" from the Dream of Masha
- Ivan Ryzhov as Petrovich
- Dmitry Polonsky as janitor
- Marina Yakovleva as the boy's mother
- Anton Gribkov as the boy

== Awards ==
- Award for the best performance of the female role (Ailika Kremer) of the "International Film Festival of Humor and Satire" in Gabrovo-83;
- The "Golden Plateau" award of the International Film Festival of Children's Cinema, held in the framework of the festival of neo-realistic cinema in Avellino-84.
