= The Girl and the Crocodile =

- Russian: Девочка и крокодил
- Directed by: Iosif Gindin; Isaak Menaker
- Written by: Nina Gernet; Grigori Yagdfeld
- Starring: Elena Granovskaya; Evgeniy Teterin; Natalya Polinkovskaya; Natalya Zabavnaya; Zoya Fyodorova; Leonid Lvov
- Cinematography: Konstantin Sobol
- Music by: Galina Ustvolskaya
- Production company: Mosfilm
- Release date: 1956
- Running time: 68 minute
- Country: Soviet Union
- Language: Russian

The Girl and the Crocodile (Russian: Девочка и крокодил) is a 1956 Soviet children's comedy film directed by Iosif Gindin and Isaak Menaker.

A young naturalist Mitya gives animals to a girl named Katya, who loves them very much, but does not know how to take care of them.

== Plot ==
A young girl named Katya meets a boy named Mitya on the street, sitting among two cages and two boxes. Inside the cages are rabbits and a starling, while the boxes contain a turtle and a real crocodile. Mitya shares his story: his father, a sailor, brought back an egg from Africa, which hatched into a baby crocodile. Initially, Mitya’s mother is charmed by the creature, but as the crocodile grows, her affection fades. The situation worsens when Mitya reads Alfred Brehm's The Life of Animals and mentions that their crocodile is a massive Malagasy species related to the Nile crocodile. His mother, after reading Brehm herself, panics at the idea of the crocodile growing to 10 meters and potentially devouring them.

The tension peaks when Mitya’s school closes its nature corner for summer renovations, and he brings home two rabbits, a turtle, and a starling. His mother issues an ultimatum: she’ll tolerate the animals until autumn, but only if the crocodile is returned to the school’s nature corner as well. One morning during breakfast, the crocodile causes chaos by pulling the tablecloth off the table. Forced to remove the animals from the apartment, Mitya contemplates finding a temporary home for them while he arranges with a friend outside the city to keep them for the summer. Katya immediately offers to take care of the animals at her place.

== Cast ==
- Elena Granovskaya
- Evgeniy Teterin
- Natalya Polinkovskaya
- Natalya Zabavnaya
- Zoya Fyodorova
- Leonid Lvov
- Lyudmila Makarova
- Pyotr Repnin
- Yelizaveta Uvarova
- Svetlana Mazovetskaya
- Richard Lojko
- Tamara Sukova
- Yuri Bublikov
- N. Yanet
- Natalya Seleznyova
