= Makarov (film) =

- Russian: Макаров
- Directed by: Vladimir Khotinenko
- Written by: Valeri Zalotukha
- Produced by: Vladimir Khotinenko
- Starring: Sergey Makovetsky; Elena Mayorova; Irina Metlitskaya; Vladimir Ilyin; Sergei Parshin
- Cinematography: Evgeniy Grebnev
- Edited by: Svetlana Tarik
- Music by: Aleksandr Pantykin
- Release date: 1993
- Country: Russia
- Language: Russian

Makarov (Russian: Макаров) is a 1993 Russian thriller drama film written by Valeri Zalotukha and directed and produced by Vladimir Khotinenko. The film won the Nika Award for Best Picture of the Year in 1994.

== Plot ==
The film follows the poet Alexander Sergeyevich Makarov as he receives a pistol with which he shares his name, radically changing his life and relations with people around him.

== Cast ==
- Sergey Makovetsky as Aleksandr Sergeyevich Makarov
- Elena Mayorova as Natasha, his wife (as Yelena Majorova)
- Irina Metlitskaya as Margo
- Vladimir Ilyin as Vasya
- Sergei Parshin
- Leonid Okunyov
- Evgeniy Steblov
- Viktor Smirnov
- Ilya Rutberg
- Ivan Agafonov
