= To Marry a Captain =

- Russian: Выйти замуж за капитана
- Directed by: Vitaliy Melnikov
- Written by: Valentin Chernykh
- Starring: Vera Glagoleva; Viktor Proskurin; Vera Vasileva; Nikolay Rybnikov; Yuriy Demich
- Cinematography: Boris Liznev
- Music by: Isaac Schwarts
- Production company: Lenfilm Studio
- Release date: 1985
- Running time: 90 minute
- Country: Soviet Union
- Language: Russian

To Marry a Captain (Russian: Выйти замуж за капитана) is a 1985 Soviet romantic comedy film directed by Vitaliy Melnikov. and written by Valentin Chernykh. starring Vera Glagoleva, Viktor Proskurin, and Vera Vasilyeva.

== Plot ==
The film tells about an independent young woman who meets the captain and begins to understand how great it is to feel loved.

== Cast ==
- Vera Glagoleva as Lena Zhuravlyova
- Viktor Proskurin as Captain Blinov
- Vera Vasilyeva as Vera Zhuravlyova
- Nikolay Rybnikov as Kondrat Petrovich
- Yuriy Demich as Lyadov
- Svetlana Kryuchkova as Dizayner
- Fyodor Odinokov
- Tatyana Rudina
- Valentina Berezutskaya
