= Trubachyov's Detachment Is Fighting =

- Russian: Отряд Трубачёва сражается
- Directed by: Ilya Frez
- Written by: Ilya Frez; Valentina Oseyeva
- Starring: Oleg Vishnev; Aleksandr Chudakov; Vladimir Semenovich
- Cinematography: Konstantin Arutyunov; Sergei Gavrilov
- Edited by: Berta Pogrebinskaya
- Music by: Aleksandr Lebedev; Mikhail Ziv
- Production company: Gorky Film Studio
- Release date: 1957
- Running time: 90 min.
- Country: Soviet Union
- Language: Russian

Trubachyov's Detachment Is Fighting (Russian: Отряд Трубачёва сражается, romanized: Otryad Trubachyova srazhayetsya) is a 1957 Soviet war adventure film directed by Ilya Frez. Sequel of Vasyok Trubachyov and His Comrades.

== Plot ==
The film takes place during the Great Patriotic War. The film shows the adventures that happened to the pioneers, who found themselves on the territory occupied by the fascists.

== Cast ==
- Oleg Vishnev as Vasyok Trubachyov
- Vladimir Semenovich as Sasha Bulgakov
- Aleksandr Chudakov as Kolya Odintsov
- Vyacheslav Devkin as Kolya Mazin
- Zhora Aleksandrov as Petya Rusakov
- Vladimir Yemelyanov as Miron Dmitrievich
- Natalya Rychagova as Nyura Sinitsyna
- Yuri Bogolyubov as Sergey Nikolaevich, teacher
- Leonid Kharitonov as Mitya Burtsev
- Anatoly Kubatsky as grandfather Mikhailo
- Ivan Ryzhov as Yakov Pryanik

== See also ==
- Vasyok Trubachyov and His Comrades (1955)
