= Adventures of the Yellow Suitcase =

1970 film

- Directed by: Ilya Frez
- Written by: Sofia Prokofieva; Ilya Frez
- Starring: Tatyana Pelttser; Yevgeni Lebedev; Natalya Seleznyova; Boris Bystrov
- Cinematography: Mikhail Kirillov
- Edited by: V. Pogozheva
- Music by: Yan Frenkel
- Production company: Gorky Film Studio
- Release date: 1970
- Running time: 74 minutes
- Country: Soviet Union
- Language: Russian

Adventures of the Yellow Suitcase (Russian: Приключения жёлтого чемоданчика, romanized: Priklucheniya zheltogo chemodanchika) is a 1970 children's fantasy film directed by Ilya Frez based on the eponymous story by Sofia Prokofieva.

== Plot ==
In one sunny city live two cute and unusual children; boy Petya and girl Toma. Toma is an "ice queen" because she never smiles and often cries, and Petya is a coward who lacks courage. One day Petya's mom and Toma's dad decide to turn to the doctor. The doctor is unusual, he has candies against fear, and with the help of other sweets he can heal from anger and cunning, stupidity, sadness, lies, gossip.

But, by an incredible coincidence, a suitcase of yellow color with miracle drugs comes into the wrong hands. Under threat are the lives of Toma's grandmother, the pilot Verevkin - Toma's father, the tamer of tigers Bulankin.

Toma's grandmother, doctor, Toma and Petya set off on a quest for the suitcase containing the magic medicines.

== Cast ==
- Tatyana Pelttser as Anna Petrovna, Toma's grandmother
- Yevgeni Lebedev as children's doctor
- Andrei Gromov as Petya
- Viktoria Chernakova as Toma
- Natalya Seleznyova as Petya's mother Petya
- Boris Bystrov as pilot Veryovkin, Toma's dad
- Viktor Tikhonov as Fyodor Bulankin
- Yevgeniy Vesnik as Airport manager
- Konstantin Kuntyshev as foreman
