= The Adventures of Elektronik =

1979 Soviet television miniseries

- Written by: Yevgeny Veltistov
- Directed by: Konstantin Bromberg
- Music by: Yevgeni Krylatov
- Country of origin: Soviet Union
- Original language: Russian

Production
- Cinematography: Konstantin Apryatin; Alexander Polynnikov
- Editor: Nadezhda Yavorskaya
- Running time: 215 min
- Production companies: Gosteleradio; Odesa Film Studio

Original release
- Release: 27 December 1979

The Adventures of Elektronik (Russian: «Приключения Электроника», romanized: Priklyucheniya Elektronika) is a 1979 Soviet children's science fiction TV miniseries, directed by Konstantin Bromberg.

The series' screenplay was loosely adapted by Yevgeny Veltistov from his own children's novels, Elektronik – the Boy from the Suitcase (Электроник — мальчик из чемодана, 1964) Ressy – an Elusive Friend (Рэсси — неуловимый друг, 1971), and Conqueror of the impossible (Победитель невозможного, 1975). The TV premiere was on 2 May 1980. The film achieved a cult status among the Soviet kids.

== Plot summary ==
A robot named Elektronik escapes from Professor Gromov's laboratory. The robot looks exactly like Sergey (Serezha) Syroezhkin, a boy from a magazine cover, who was chosen by Gromov as a model to construct Elektronik.

By coincidence, the double meets its prototype. 6-grader Serezha cunningly suggests that Elektronik should impersonate him – go to school instead of him and even live in his home. His plan works, as no one can tell the difference between them. Serezha's teachers delight in a very gifted pupil, who suddenly shows unbelievable talents in math, gymnastics, drawing and even singing. Sergey's parents do not suspect his trick and are glad of their pseudo-son's progress.

However, eventually the boy realizes that as the robot takes over "his" life, he may be out of business...

At the same time somewhere abroad, a gang of criminals operates. It is headed by a criminal authority known as Stump. He tells Urrie, the gang's most skillful member to find and kidnap Elektronik. They want to organize the "crime of the century" with the use of his extraordinary abilities.

== Cast ==
- Yury Torsuyev as Sergey Syroyezhkin (dubbed by Irina Grishina, vocal by Elena Kamburova)
- Vladimir Torsuyev as Elektronik (dubbed by Nadezhda Pod'yapol'skaya, vocal by Elena Shuyenkova)
- Vasily Skromny as Makar Gusev
- Oksana Alekseyeva as Maya Svetlova
- Maksim Kalinin as Maksim Korol'kov
- Dmitri Maksimov as Viktor Smirnov
- Evgeny Livshits as Chizhikov (often mistakenly called Ryzhikov)
- Valeriya Soluyan as Zoya Kukushkina
- Oksana Fandera as an unnamed schoolgirl who gets Chizhikov's name wrong.
- Vladimir Basov as Stump
- Nikolai Karachentsov as Urrie
- Nikolai Grinko as Prof. Viktor Ivanovich Gromov
- Yelizaveta Nikishchikhina as Masha, Gromov's assistant
- Yevgeny Vesnik as Taratar, the math teacher
- Maya Bulgakova as School's headmistress
- Nikolay Boyarsky as Rostik, the gymnastics teacher
- Roza Makagonova as singing lessons teacher
- Nataliya Vasazhenko as Sergey's mother
- Yuri Chernov as Sergey's father
- Lev Perfilov as Lyug, Stump's gangster
- Gennadi Yalovich as Bree, Stump's gangster

== Production ==
Originally, it was planned that both Syroyezhkin and Elektronik roles would be played by just one boy. But the director of the film decided to simplify the filming process by using twins. His assistants screened a hundred twins throughout most of the Soviet Union. One of the casting days took place in the winter, when the temperature was below zero, nobody came except for the Torsuyev brothers. It was they who were cast in leading roles. In test filmings, Yuri played the role of Elektronik and Vladimir of Syroyezhkin, but the roles were later changed by the director. During the filming period the kids grew up too fast, and it was necessary to make new costumes from time to time.

=== Music ===
Music for the film were written by Yevgeni Krylatov. The songs were performed in the film by Yelena Kamburova, Yelena Shuenkova and the chorus; no actors, except for Karachentsov and Basov, were afforded an opportunity to sing (The lyrics were written by Yuri Entin).
