= Yevgeny Vesnik =

Soviet and Russian actor

Yevgeny Vesnik PAU
- Евгений Весник
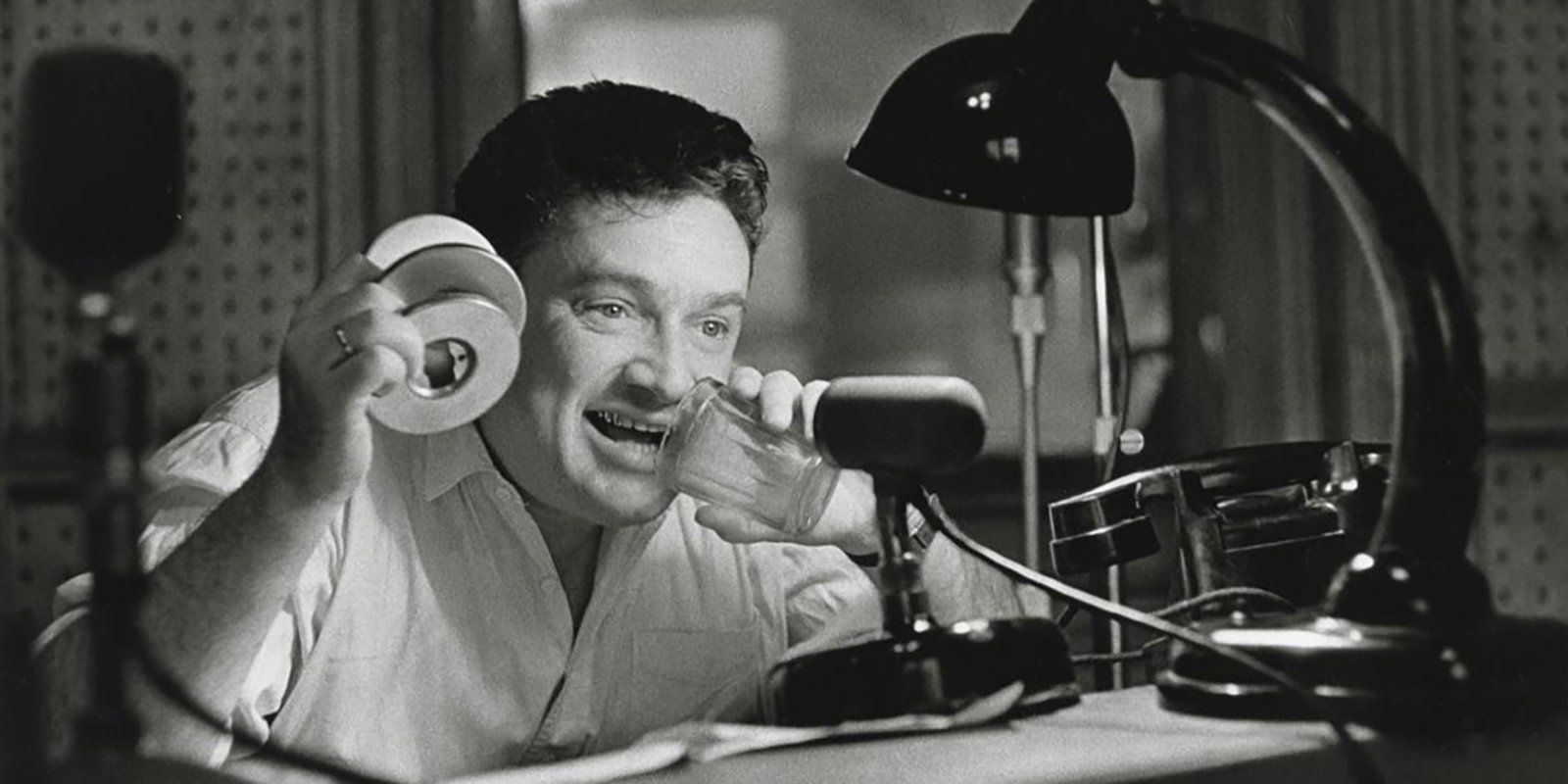
- Vesnik in 1998
- Born: 15 January 1923; Petrograd, Russian SFSR, USSR
- Died: 10 April 2009 (aged 86); Moscow, Russia
- Occupation: actor

Yevgeny Yakovlevich Vesnik (Russian: Евгений Яковлевич Весник; 15 January 1923 – 10 April 2009) was a Soviet and Russian actor. The son of Yakov Vesnik, the first director of the Kryvorizhstal plant, he fought the Germans in World War II. He worked at the Maly Theatre from 1963 and was named a People's Artist of the USSR in 1989, three years before his retirement from the stage.

== Career ==
Primarily a comedian, Vesnik is remembered as the first Soviet actor to play the character of Ostap Bender. After he was remembered as Taratar in The Adventures of the Elektronic (1979), one of greatest Soviet films for children.

Among his other roles are the policeman in Old Khottabych, boss of sport complex in Seven Old Men and a Girl, procurator in Die Fledermaus, commissioner in Charodei (1982), radist in Weather Is Good on Deribasovskaya, It Rains Again on Brighton Beach and many other films.

He died, aged 86, on 10 April 2009 in Moscow after suffering a stroke.

== Honors and awards ==
- Order "For Merit to the Fatherland", 4th class
- Order of the Red Banner of Labour
- Order of Friendship of Peoples
- Order of the Patriotic War 2nd class
- Order of the Red Star
- Medal "For the Victory over Germany in the Great Patriotic War 1941–1945"
- Two Medals "For Courage"
- Medal "For the Capture of Königsberg"
- Medal "Veteran of Labour"
- Medal "In Commemoration of the 800th Anniversary of Moscow"
- Jubilee Medal "50 Years of the Armed Forces of the USSR"
- Medal "In Commemoration of the 850th Anniversary of Moscow"
- Medal of Zhukov
- Honored Artist of the RSFSR (1961)
- People's Artist of the RSFSR (1971)
- People's Artist of the USSR (1989)

== Selected filmography ==
- Othello (1955) as Roderigo
- Old Khottabych (1957) as guard policeman
- The Adventures of Buratino (1959) as Father Carlo (voice)
- Footprint in the Ocean (1964) as Ivan Yeltsov (as Ye. Vesnik)
- An Ordinary Miracle (1965) as hunter
- Strong with Spirit (1967) as Voronchuk
- I Loved You (1968) as Pavel Golikov
- Trembita (1968) as Bogdan Susik
- The New Adventures of the Elusive Avengers (1968) as Polpovnik
- Ded Moroz and Summer (1969, Short) as truck driver / policeman / doctor (voice)
- Seven Old Men and a Girl (1970, TV Movie) as sports complex director
- Adventures of the Yellow Suitcase (1970) as Airport manager
- Officers (1971) as paramedic
- We Didn't Learn This (1976) as Ivan Andreevich, glavniy arkhitektor
- Die Fledermaus (1979, TV Movie) as Prosecutor
- The Adventures of the Elektronic (1979, TV Mini-Series) as Math Teacher 'Tarator'
- The Theme (1979) as Igor Paschin, writer
- The Fairfax Millions (1980) as Police Commissioner
- Dog in Boots (1981, Short) as Cardinal's Cat (voice)
- Sorcerers (1982, TV Movie) as chairman of the commission
- Act, Manya! (1991) as biologist and geneticist Yevgeni Danilovitch
- Weather Is Good on Deribasovskaya, It Rains Again on Brighton Beach (1992) as Monya, ex-radist
- What a Mess! (1995) as doctor
- The Master and Margarita (2006) as professor Stravinskiy (final film role)
