= Personal file of Judge Ivanova =

- Russian: Личное дело судьи Ивановой
- Directed by: Ilya Frez
- Written by: Galina Shcherbakova
- Starring: Natalya Gundareva; Sergey Shakurov; Oksana Datskaya; Liliya Gritsenko; Marina Zudina
- Cinematography: Ilya Frez, Jr.
- Music by: Mark Minkov
- Production company: Gorky Film Studio
- Release date: 1985
- Running time: 85 minutes
- Country: Soviet Union
- Language: Russian

Personal file of Judge Ivanova (Russian: Личное дело судьи Ивановой) is a 1985 Soviet drama film directed by Ilya Frez.

== Plot ==
The film tells about Judge Ivanova everything was wonderful until her husband met his daughter's music teacher and fell in love with her.

== Cast ==
- Natalya Gundareva as Lyubov Grigoryevna Ivanova
- Sergey Shakurov as Sergey Ivanov
- Oksana Datskaya as Lena Ivanova
- Liliya Gritsenko as Lyubov's mother
- Marina Zudina as Olga Nikolaevna
- Tatyana Pelttser as Anna Nikolaevna
- Aleksey Guskov as Volodya Klimov
- Aristarkh Livanov as Stranger
- Larisa Grebenshchikova as Nilina
- Anna Belyuzhenko as Nilina's daughter (as Anya Belyuzhenko)
