= Ded Moroz and Summer =

1969 Soviet animated cartoon

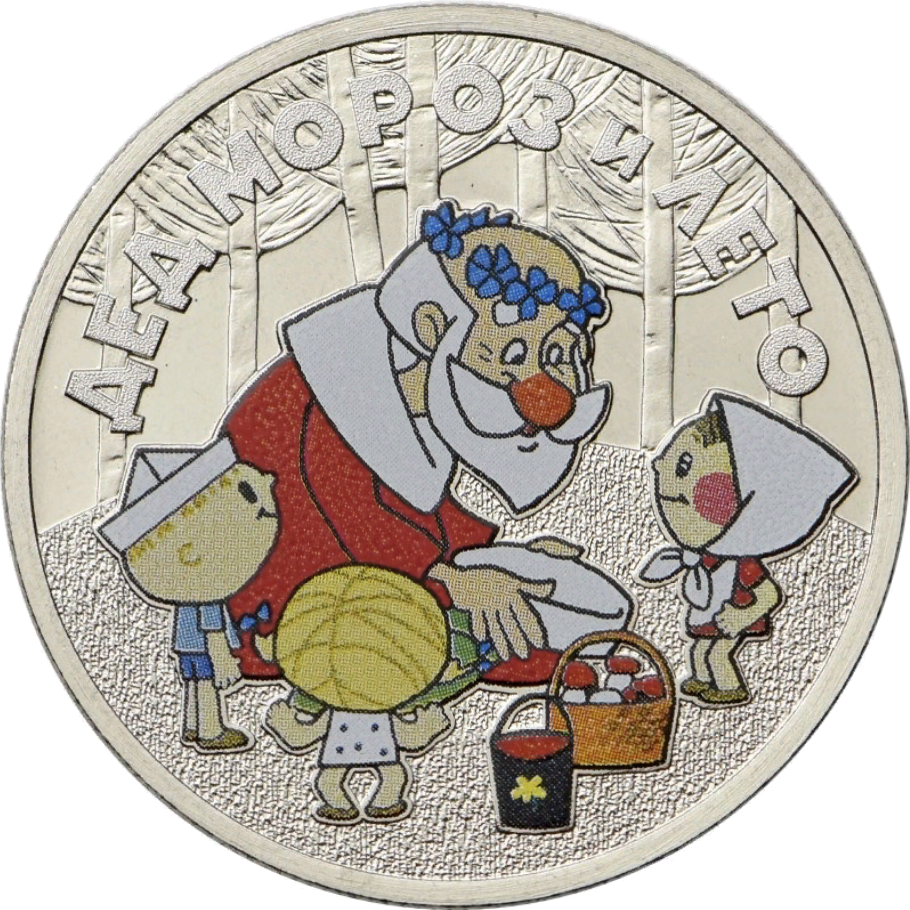
- commemorative coin, 2019
- Directed by: Valentin Karavaev
- Written by: Yuri Entin; Vasily Livanov
- Produced by: Ivan Ivanov-Vano; Lyubov Butyrina
- Starring: Yevgeny Shutov; Yevgeny Vesnik; Zinaida Naryshkina
- Cinematography: Boris Kotov
- Music by: Yevgeny Krylatov
- Production company: Soyuzmultfilm
- Release date: 1969
- Running time: 20 minutes
- Country: Soviet Union
- Language: Russian

Ded Moroz and Summer (also known as Father Frost and Summer) (Russian: Дед Мороз и лето, romanized: Ded Moroz i leto) is a 1969 Soviet animated children's Novy God cartoon about how Ded Moroz (Russian equivalent to Santa Claus) finds out what summer is.

== Plot ==
Ded Moroz is at his house in a wintry setting, packing and painting toys for children. However, he overhears a conversation about summer, a season he knows nothing about. Curious and determined to learn, he begins to wonder what summer is like. Despite the animals around his house thinking he’s gone mad for pondering such an idea, Ded Moroz resolves to find out.

Traveling south, he encounters several children who introduce him to the wonders of summer. However, the intense heat proves too much for him, and he starts to feel unwell. The children, eager to help, give him ice cream to cool down and accompany him to explore the lush green forests, fields, and lively creatures of the season. Delighted by the experience, Ded Moroz is inspired by the beauty of summer, shares ice cream with the children as thanks, and returns to his northern home aboard a hot air balloon.
