= I Loved You (film) =

- Original Russian film poster
- Directed by: Ilya Frez
- Written by: Mikhail Lvovsky
- Starring: Viktor Perevalov; Violetta Khusnulova; Valeri Ryzhakov; Natalya Seleznyova; Yevgeniy Vesnik; Vera Orlova
- Cinematography: Andrei Kirillov; Mikhail Kirillov
- Edited by: Valentina Mironova
- Music by: Nektarius Chargeishvili
- Production company: Gorky Film Studio
- Release date: 1968
- Running time: 91 minutes
- Country: Soviet Union
- Language: Russian

I Loved You (Russian: Я вас любил…, romanized: Ya vas lyubil...), is a 1968 Soviet teen romance film directed by Ilya Frez and written by Mikhail Lvovsky. Produced by the Gorky Film Studio, it premiered on 29 January 1968 and, with 21,3 million viewers, became one of the Soviet box office leaders of that year.

The film was internationally popular in Eastern Europe. The film's topic was awakening romantic feelings in a group of Russian teenagers.

== Plot summary ==
15-year-old Kolya Golikov falls in love with Nadya Naumchenko, an aspiring teenage ballet dancer and a Choreography school student. Infatuated, he goes out of his way to impress her, among other things by perfume, cigarettes and his peculiar style of dancing too. Utter ridiculousness of his ways notwithstanding, Nadya seems to like the boy. Over-excited during the night walk, as the two approach the place she lives in, Kolya starts to behave towards her somewhat acquisitively. Taken aback, the girl declares herself to be totally disillusioned with him. "You do not seem interesting to me, not anymore!" she exclaims. Weeks pass. And Kolya, who's always been good at mathematics but bad at learning poems by heart, is so shattered by this fiasco as to impress his school examiners with passionate recital of "I Loved You...", Pushkin's famous paean to unrequited love.

Autumn comes and it's time for the older boy, Zhora, to be conscripted. He decides to spend his last evening together with his friends and takes them all to the concert in the local theatre. There Kolya sees Nadya dancing on stage. He is awe-struck and enchanted again. Minutes later, behind the curtains Nadya learns about Zhora's company being there in the audience. "And... is Kolya there too?" she can't help asking, leaving the finale open.

== Cast ==
- Viktor Perevalov as Kolya
- Violetta Khusnulova as Nadya
- Valeri Ryzhakov as Zhora
- Natalya Seleznyova as Lidia Nikolayevna, teacher of literature
- Yevgeniy Vesnik as father
- Vera Orlova as mother
- Natalia Dudinskaya as Zoya Pavlovna, ballet teacher
