= Bride with a Dowry =

- Russian: Свадьба с приданым
- Directed by: Tatyana Lukashevich; Boris Ravenskih
- Written by: N. Dyakonov
- Starring: Vera Vasilyeva; Vladimir Ushakov; Vladimir Dorofeyev; Galina Kozhakina; Mikhail Dorokhin; Vitali Doronin
- Cinematography: Semyon Sheynin; Nikolay Vlasov
- Music by: Nikolay Budashkin; Boris Mokrousov
- Release date: 1953
- Running time: 105 minute
- Country: Soviet Union

Bride with a Dowry (Russian: Свадьба с приданым) is a 1953 Soviet musical comedy film directed by Tatyana Lukashevich and Boris Ravenskih.

== Plot ==
The film tells about the couple in love with brigade leaders who suddenly quarreled and began to compete with each other, which significantly increased the yield and they are together again.

== Starring ==
- Vera Vasilyeva
- Vladimir Ushakov
- Vladimir Dorofeyev
- Galina Kozhakina
- Mikhail Dorokhin
- Vitali Doronin
- Kira Kanaeva as Galya
- L. Kuzmichyova
- Tatyana Pelttser as Lukerya Pokhlyobkina
