= Tatyana Pelttser =

Soviet and Russian actress

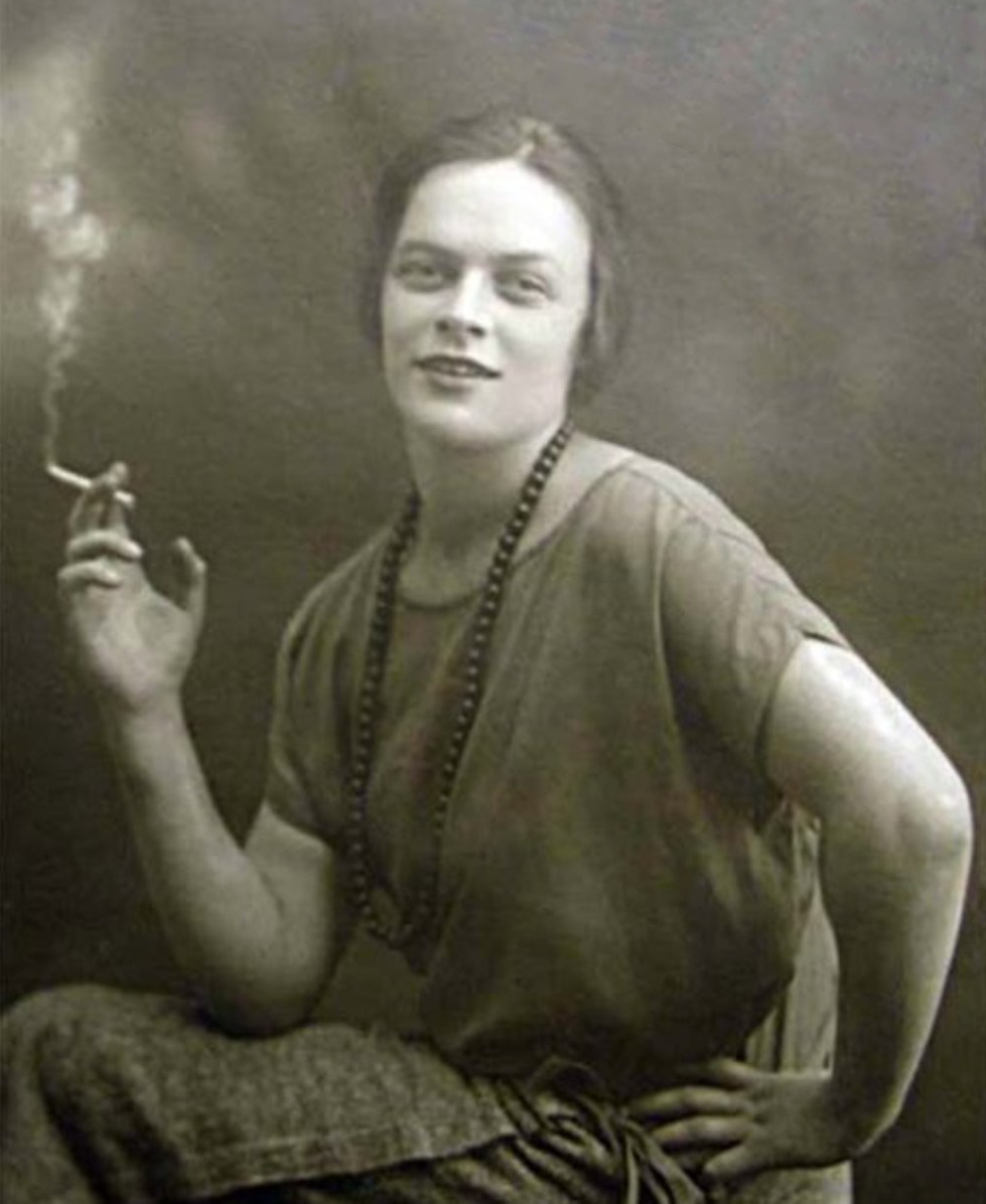
- Tatyana Pelttser in the 1920s
- Born: Tatyana Ivanovna Pelttser; June 6, 1904; Moscow, Russian Empire
- Died: July 16, 1992 (aged 88); Moscow, Russia
- Years active: 1920–1992

Tatyana Ivanovna Pelttser (Russian: Татья́на Ива́новна Пе́льтцер; German: Tatjana Peltzer; June 6, 1904 in Moscow – July 16, 1992 in Moscow), was a Soviet and Russian stage and film actress. People's Artist of the USSR (1972).

== Biography ==
Tatyana Ivanovna Pelttser, (or Peltzer) born into the family of the well-known actor Ivan Pelttser, first took the stage at the age of nine. The paternal family came from cloth manufacturer Napoléon Peltzer (1802-1889) from Stolberg in the Rhineland, who emigrated to Russia in 1821. Tatyana's mother Esfir (Ester) Borukhovna Roizen (1884-1962) came from a Jewish-Ukrainian family. After marriage, Esfir converted to the Russian Orthodox faith and adopted the first name Yevgeniya. Initially Tatyana played in provincial theatres, and then was engaged in MGSPS Theatre (Moscow) and in Moscow Theatre of Miniatures subsequently. From 1947 she was a leading actress of the Satire Theatre.

Tatyana Pelttser made her film debut in the drama film She Defends the Motherland (1943), and then appeared in the satirical comedy The Wedding (1944). Her first remarkable film role was that of Plaksina in Grigori Kozintsev and Leonid Trauberg’s Simple People (1945). The actress gained enormous popularity with her role of Lukerya in the stage play Bride with a Dowry (1953), which was filmed and demonstrated in the country's cinemas on a large scale. It was followed by another successful film, namely Private Ivan (1955), where she played the main character’s mother. Her first role in the Satire Theatre was that of Mrs. Jacobs in Evgeny Petrov's pamphlet "Island of Peace". In her benefit role of Aunt Tonia in the play Wake Up and Sing Tatyana Pelttser would sing, dance and fly upstairs with the sprite of a young girl, though she was already nearly seventy. In the same manner she performed Marselina in the play Crazy Day, or Marriage of Figaro. Among the great number of her roles in Satire Theatre there stood out her lead in Mother Courage and Her Children: it was an aged woman worn out by war and deprived of her children.

In 1972, she became the People's Artist of the USSR, the first one in the 48 years of the Satire Theatre's existence.

Later the actress followed the stage director Mark Zakharov who shifted to the Lenkom Theatre. In late years of her life she started losing memory. Specially for her Mark Zakharov staged the play A Funeral Prayer after the scenario by Grigori Gorin, who made up the character of the old Jewish woman Berta for Tatyana Pelttser.

In 1992, after a nervous breakdown, Tatyana Ivanovna found herself in a hospital and died on 16 July 1992. Tatyana Pelttser was buried at Vvedenskoye Cemetery nearby her father's grave.

Tatyana was married to the German communist Hans Teubner from 1927 to 1931.

== Filmography ==
- She Defends the Motherland (1943)
- The Wedding (1944)
- Simple People (1945)
- The Precious Seed (1948)
- Bride with a Dowry (1953)
- Tamer of Tigers (1954)
- A Big Family (1954)
- Certificate of Maturity (1954)
- Bakhtiar (1955)
- Two Captains (1955)
- Private Ivan (1955)
- Maksim Perepelitsa (1955)
- Honeymoon (1956)
- Ivan Brovkin on the State Farm (1958)
- Les Enfants terribles (1963; Soviet dub)
- Jack Frost (1964)
- A Little Crane (1968)
- Village Detective (1969)
- Adventures of the Yellow Suitcase (1970)
- The Twelve Months (1972)
- Crank from 5th B (1972)
- Tsarevich Prosha (1974)
- We Didn't Learn This (1975)
- The Twelve Chairs (1976)
- You to Me, Me to You (1976)
- How Ivanushka the Fool Travelled in Search of Wonder (1977)
- Three Men in a Boat (1979)
- Sailors Have No Questions (1980)
- Night Accident (1980)
- Could One Imagine? (1981)
- The Donkey's Hide (1982)
- Along Unknown Paths (1982)
- Quarantine (1983)
- And Then Came Bumbo... (1984)
- Formula of Love (1984)
- After the Rain, on Thursday (1985)
- Personal file of Judge Ivanova (1985)
- How to Become Happy (1986)
