= Could One Imagine? =

- Russian: Вам и не снилось
- Directed by: Ilya Frez
- Written by: Galina Shcherbakova, Ilya Frez
- Cinematography: Gasan Tutunov
- Edited by: L. Rodionova
- Music by: Alexey Rybnikov
- Production company: Gorky Film Studio
- Release date: 23 March 1981
- Running time: 90 minutes
- Country: Soviet Union
- Language: Russian

Could One Imagine? (Russian: Вам и не снилось, romanized: Vam i ne snilos), also released as Love and Lies, is a 1981 Soviet teen drama film directed by Ilya Frez based on the novella by Galina Shcherbakova.

== Plot ==
High school student Katya Shevchenko (Tatyana Aksyuta) moves to a new district and meets classmate Roman Lavochkin (Nikita Mikhaylovsky) at school. Gradually their friendship grows into love, which appears surprisingly strong to the adults around them. Roman's father, Konstantin (Albert Filozov), was in love with Katya's mother, Lyudmila (Irina Miroshnichenko), who eventually rejected him. Roman's mother, Vera (Lidiya Fedoseyeva-Shukshina), jealous of Katya's mother, hates her and her daughter. Aspiring to separate the children by force, she transfers Roman to another school and forbids them to meet. But love between Katya and Roman does not diminish.

Then Vera deceives her son, forcing him to leave Moscow for Leningrad for a long time to take care of an allegedly sick grandmother (Tatyana Pelttser), who in turn suppresses Katya's attempts to reach Roman or write to him. Katya and Roman are supported only by classmates and teacher Tatyana Nikolaevna (Yelena Solovey), who faces problems in her own personal life. She becomes aware of Vera's deception and tells the truth to Lyudmila and her husband, Vladimir. Katya decides to go to Leningrad and find out everything herself. In the meantime, Roman, who can not understand why Katya does not answer any of his letters (all of Katya's letters are intercepted by his grandmother), calls Tatyana Nikolaevna. She mistakes him for Mikhail (Leonid Filatov), her lover with whom she had a falling-out, and tells him never to call again. Pained and uncertain, Roman accidentally overhears a telephone conversation between his grandmother and his mother, and finds out the truth: the grandmother is not sick at all, and all of this is merely an act to prevent him from seeing Katya any more.

Shocked by the betrayal of those close to him, Roman locks himself in his room. The grandmother tries to reach him. Roman looks out his window and sees Katya, who has come to Leningrad. Roman tries to leave the room, but his grandmother tries to keep him from Katya and her "vicious" family. Roman opens the window and calls to Katya; but he slips on the windowsill and breaks the frame, and falls to the ground. His fall is mitigated by a snowdrift. Katya runs to him and tries to help him stand, but in the end they fall back together into the snow. They are watched by two small children, a boy and a girl. But they are together again.

== Cast ==
- Tatyana Aksyuta as Katya Shevchenko
- Nikita Mikhailovsky as Roman Lavochkin (voiced by Alexander Soloviev)
- Yelena Solovey as Tatyana Koltsova, teacher of literature
- Irina Miroshnichenko as Lyudmila Sergeevna, Katya's mother
- Lidiya Fedoseyeva-Shukshina as Vera Vasilievna Lavochkina, Roman's mother
- Albert Filozov as Konstantin Lavochkin, Roman's father
- Tatyana Pelttser as Roman's grandmother
- Rufina Nifontova as Tatyana Nikolaevna's mother
- Yevgeny Gerasimov as Uncle Volodya, Katya's stepfather
- Leonid Filatov as Mikhail Slavin, Tatyana Nikolaevna's lover
- Vadim Kurkov as Sashka Ramazanov, Roman's classmate
- Ekaterina Vasilyeva as Alena Startseva, Roman's classmate
- Nina Mazaeva as Maria Alekseevna, the principal of the school
- Lyubov Sokolova as Lisa, the postman
- Natalia Martinson as Ella, Tatyana Nikolaevna's girlfriend
- Lyubov Maikova as laboratory assistant
- Alexander Karin as physical education teacher
- Valentin Golubenko as furniture carrier
- Elena Mayorova as Zoya, Katya's neighbor
- Vladimir Prikhodko as taxi driver (voiced by Yuri Sarantsev)
- Dmitry Polonsky as classmate in a hat
- Irina Otieva as vocals (voice)

== See also ==
- One Hundred Days After Childhood (1975)
