= Natalya Seleznyova =

Soviet and Russian actress (born 1945)

- Наталья Селезнёва
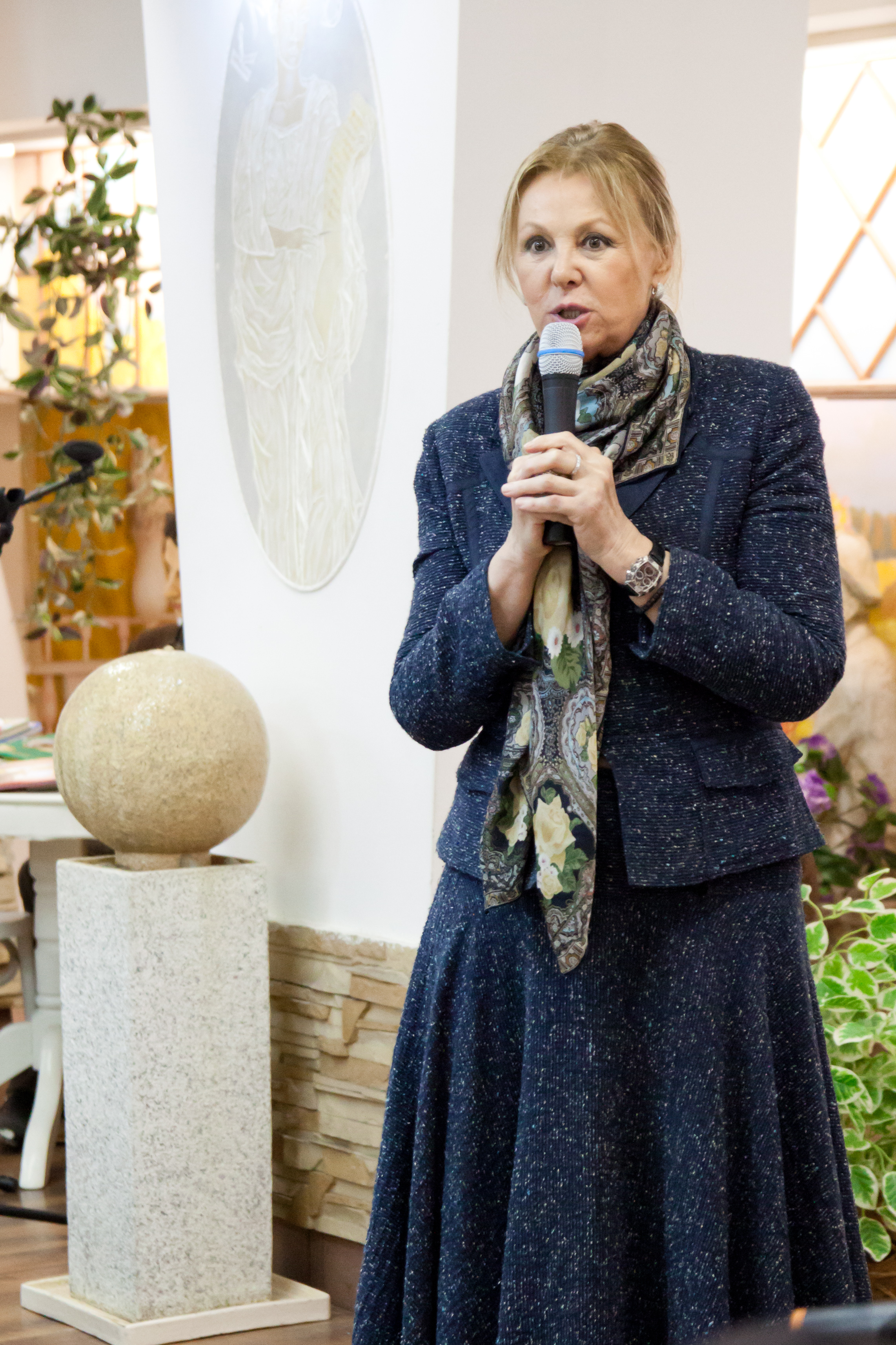
- Seleznyova in 2013
- Born: 19 June 1945 (age 80); Moscow, Russian SFSR, Soviet Union
- Occupation: Actress
- Years active: 1953–present
- Spouse: Vladimir Andreyev (m. 1968; died 2020)
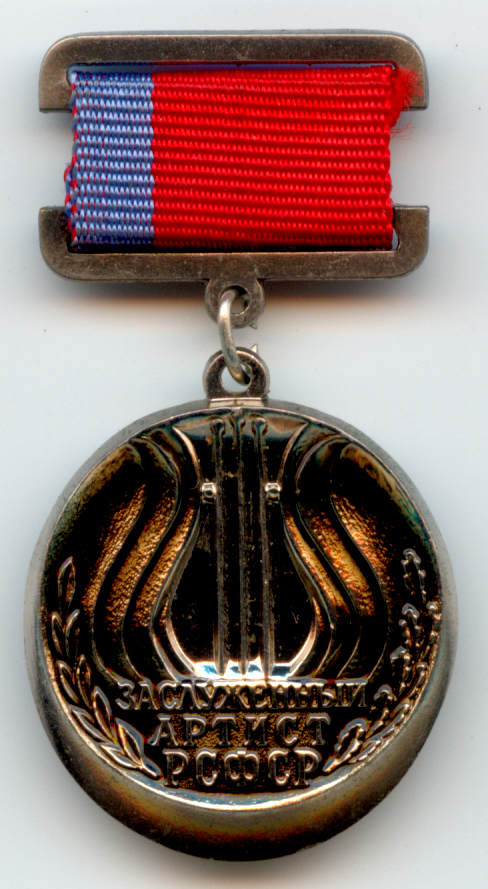
- Awards

Natalya Igorevna Seleznyova (Russian: Наталья Игоревна Селезнёва; born 19 June 1945) is a Soviet and Russian theater and film actress.

== Biography ==
She first took the stage at the age of six, participating in the Red Army Theatre plays. Her notable cinema work includes roles in films directed by Leonid Gaidai, like Operation Y and Shurik's Other Adventures and Ivan Vasilievich: Back to the Future.

In 1966, she graduated from the Boris Shchukin Theatre Institute (course of Boris Zakhava) and became an actress of Moscow Academic Theatre of Satire. In 1968, on the set of film "Caliph-Stork" met the actor Vladimir Andreyev, whom she married.

In the 1970s, she became famous in the USSR as Mrs. Katarina, one of the main characters in "Pub "13 Chairs"" TV series.

In 2014, Seleznyova became an assistant to the Children's Rights Commissioner for the President of the Russian Federation (children's ombudsman).

== Awards ==
- Honored Artist of the RSFSR (30 September 1981)
- People's Artist of Russia (2 May 1996)
- Order of Friendship (1 December 2006)
- Order of Honour (Russia) (16 July 2015)

== Filmography ==
Year	Title	Role	Notes
1953	Alyosha Ptitsyn Grows Up	Sashenka	
1956	The Girl and the Crocodile	Katya Pastushkova	
1961	Alenka	Elizabeta, sister Nyury	
1965	Operation Y and Shurik's Other Adventures (segment "Navazhdeniye")	Lida, student at the Polytechnic Institute	
1966	Sasha-Sashenka	Sasha Krylova, painter	
1966	Who invented the wheel?	Zoyka	
1967	I Loved You	Lidia Nikolayevna	
1969	Caliph-Stork	princess	TV
1969-1981	Pub "13 Chairs"	Pani Katarina	TV series
1970	Adventures of the Yellow Suitcase	Petya's mother	
1970	As we were looking Tishka	nursery-governess	
1972	Dot, dot, comma ...	district doctor	
1973	Ivan Vasilievich: Back to the Future	Zinaida Mikhaylovna Timofeyeva	
1974	One of the lads	Alya Malysheva	
1975	It Can't Be!	Anatoly's wife	
1978	In streets of dresser were taken ...	Driver's fellow-traveller	
1979	The Theme	Svetlana, Yesenin's disciple	
1979	Adventure Nuki	mama Alyoshi	
1979	Seller birds	Countess	TV
1981	Caliph-Stork	Stork (voice)	TV Short
1982	Simply Awful!	Car repair worker	
1982	Take care of men!	Alla, a colleague and a friend of Martha Petrovna	
1985	City of brides		
1995	House		TV series
1997	Old songs 2		TV movie
1998	Old songs 3	Zinaida Mikhailovna	TV movie
1998	Virgin Mary	Inna	
1998	Attorney Jubilee	neighbor, Attorney	
2000	Agent in mini skirt	Natalya Ivanovna	
2006	You will not leave me	mother Vera	
2008	Swell mob	Aunt Sima, a neighbor Yuliya	TV movie
