= Ilya Frez =

Soviet film director

Ilya Abramovich Frez (Russian: Илья Абрамович Фрэз; 20 August 1909 – 22 June 1994), PAU, was a Soviet film director primarily known for his films for younger viewers. Among his films was the internationally popular I Loved You of 1967.

== Selected filmography ==
- First-Year Student (1948)
- Vasyok Trubachyov and His Comrades (1955)
- Trubachyov's Detachment Is Fighting (1957)
- I Loved You (1967)
- Adventures of the Yellow Suitcase (1970)
- Crank from 5th B (1970)
- We Didn't Learn This (1975)
- Could One Imagine? (1981)
- Quarantine (1983)
- Personal file of Judge Ivanova (1985)
