= Bela Rudenko =

Ukrainian and Russian opera singer (1933–2021)

Bela Andreevna Rudenko (Russian: Бэ́ла Андре́евна Руде́нко; August 18, 1933 – October 13, 2021) was a Ukrainian and Russian opera singer, music teacher, and professor of the Moscow Conservatory. She was awarded the People's Artist of the USSR in 1960 and a Laureate of the USSR State Prize in 1971.
