= Petr Migunov =

Russian opera and classical singer (born 1974)

- Пётр Викторович Мигунов
- Born: Petr Victorovich Migunov; August 24, 1974 (age 51); Saint Petersburg, Soviet Union
- Occupation: Classical singer (bass)
- Years active: 1997-present

Petr Migunov (Russian: Пётр Викторович Мигунов; born August 24, 1974) is a Russian opera and classical singer (bass) who graduated from the Saint Petersburg Conservatory and was a winner of both the Tokyo and Salzburg Competitions in 1997 and 1999 respectively. He is well known for his performances as the bass soloist in Beethoven's Ninth Symphony as well as in the requiems of Mozart and Faure. He is also known for his singing of operatic bass roles such as Mephistopheles in Faust, Prince Gremin in Eugene Onegin, René in Iolanta and Don Iñigo in L'heure espagnole. In 2000 he performed at both Carnegie Hall and Lincoln Center Theater and since that time performs in Russia where he is a soloist of the Bolshoi Theatre.
