= We Didn't Learn This =

- Russian: Это мы не проходили
- Directed by: Ilya Frez
- Written by: Ilya Frez; Mikhail Lvovskiy
- Starring: Natalya Rychagova; Boris Tokarev; Tatyana Kanaeva; Andrey Rostotskiy; Irina Kalinovskaya
- Cinematography: Mikhail Kirillov
- Music by: Yan Frenkel
- Release date: 1975
- Country: Soviet Union
- Language: Russian

We Didn't Learn This (Russian: Это мы не проходили, romanized: Zto my ne prokhodili) is a 1975 Soviet teen drama film directed by Ilya Frez.

== Plot ==
The film tells about the students of a pedagogical university who go to practice, where they pass difficult exams every day, both in front of teachers and schoolchildren.

== Cast ==
- Natalya Rychagova as Lena Yakusheva (as N. Rygachova)
- Boris Tokarev as Yuray Ryabinin (as B. Tokarev)
- Tatyana Kanaeva as Mila Khodzitskaya (as T. Kanaeva)
- Andrey Rostotskiy as Mitya Krasikov (as A. Rostotskiy)
- Irina Kalinovskaya as Ira (as A.Kalinovskaya)
- Antonina Maksimova as Galina Petrovna (as A. Maksimova)
- Tatyana Pelttser as Nadezhda Aleksandrovna (as T. Pelttser)
- Nina Zotkina as Valya Kuleshova (as N. Zotkina)
- Roman Tkachuk as Aleksandr Pavlovich Krasikov
- Natalya Zashchipina as Nina Krasikova
