= Merry Pictures =

- Editor-in-Chief: I. V. Antipenko (since 2000)
- Former editors: R. A. Varshamov (1977-2000)
- Frequency: Monthly
- First issue: September 1956
- Country: USSR; Russia
- Based in: Moscow
- Language: Russian
- ISSN: 0320-8044

Merry Pictures (Russian: Весёлые картинки, romanized: Vesyolye Kartinki) is a popular Soviet/Russian illustrated humorous magazine for young children.

== History ==
It has been published since September 1956. Its target audience is children of ages 4–11.

It had the largest circulation among the children's publications in the Soviet Union, reaching 5.6 million copies monthly in 1971 and 9.5 million copies monthly in early 1980s.

During the Soviet era, several well-known writers (including K. I. Chukovsky, A. L. Barto, S. Ya. Marshak) and famous artists (including A. Brey, A. Kanevsky, A. P. Sazonov and Yu. N. Uzbyakov) worked for the magazine.

In publishes verses, short stories and fairy tales, as well as board games, cartoons, rebuses, puzzles, etc. The magazine had several permanent columns ("How to learn to read", "How to learn to make toys yourself", etc.). The magazine also held an annual competition for the best children's drawing.

It has a group of recurring fantasy characters, the "Merry Little Folks Club": Karandash ("Pencil", an artist), Samodelkin ("Do-It-Yourself"), Buratino, Cipollino, Neznayka, Thumbelina, Petrushka, and Gurvinek (Czhech puppet Hurvínek).

== See also ==
- Murzilka
