= Murzilka =

Russian illustrated children's magazine

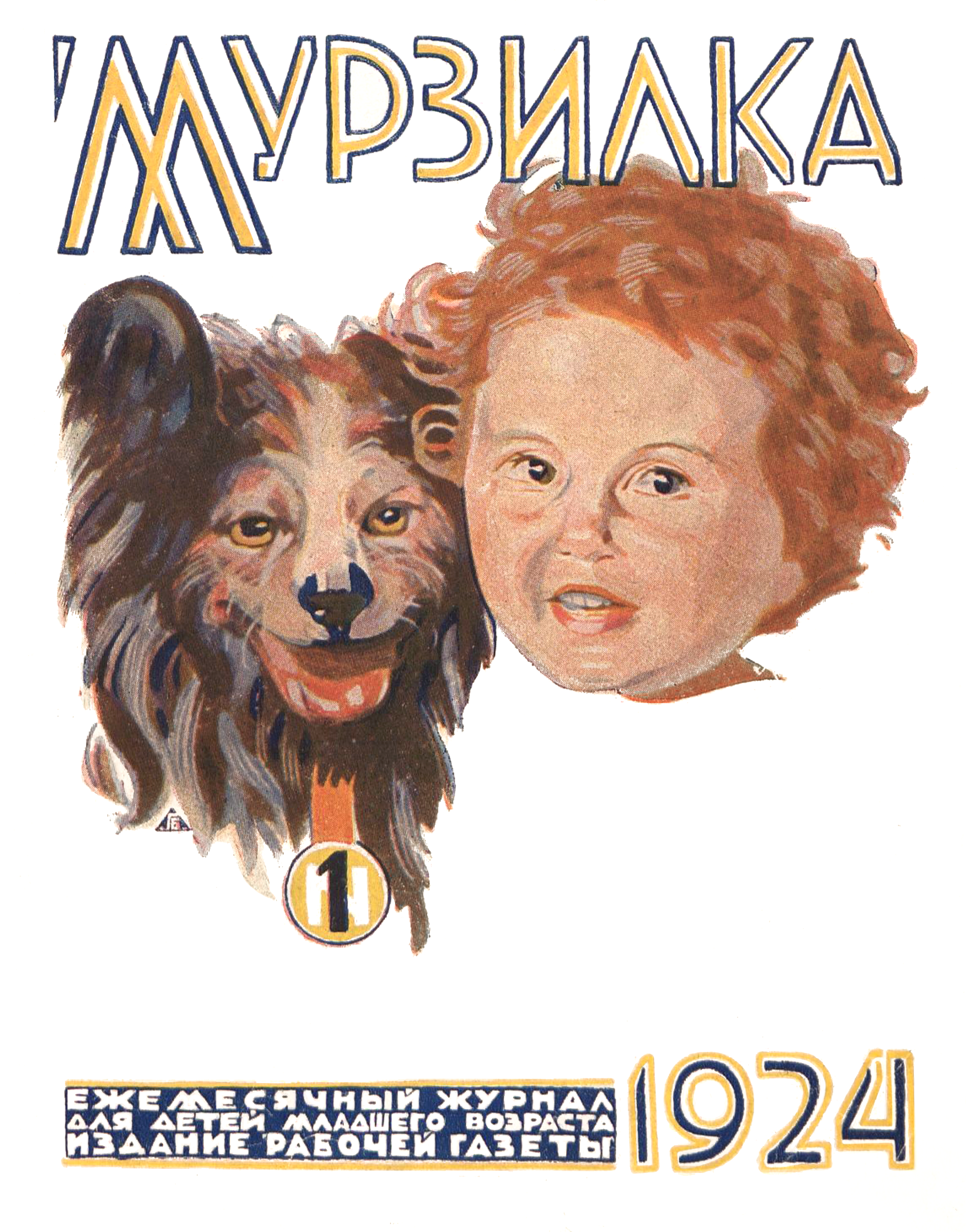
- First Issue of Murzilka
- Editor-in-Chief: Tatyana Androsenko
- Former editors: Anatoly Mityaev
- Frequency: Monthly
- Circulation: 10,500 (2024)
- First issue: 16 May 1924
- Country: Soviet Union; Russia
- Based in: Moscow
- Language: Russian
- Website: Murzilka
- ISSN: 0132-1943

Murzilka (Russian: Мурзилка) is a popular Soviet, and later Russian, illustrated magazine for children aged 7-13 years old. It has been in continued publication since May 1924.

== History and profile ==
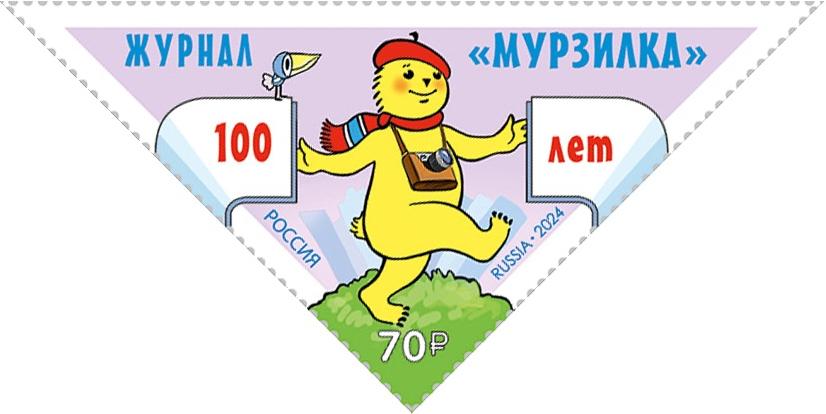
A 2024 postal stamp dedicated to the 100th anniversary of Murzilka.

At the end of the 19th century, the Canadian illustrator and writer Palmer Cox created a cycle of poems about little people from Scottish folklore known as brownies. Later the Russian author Anna Hvolson started writing stories based on his drawings about little forest men. She called the main character, who wore a white tie, had a walking stick and a monocle, "Murzilka".

The first issue of the magazine came out on 16 May 1924. There Murzilka was a small white dog and appeared with his owner Petya. The magazine is still published on a monthly basis.

In 1937, the illustrator Aminadav Kanevsky created the new design of Murzilka – now a yellow furry character in a red beret with a scarf and a camera over his shoulder.

Several famous writers have published their work there (Korney Chukovsky, M. M. Prishvin, V. V. Lebedev).

Murzilka started the creative careers of writers such as Samuil Marshak, Sergey Mikhalkov, Elena Blaginina, Boris Zahoder, Agniya Barto, Nikolay Nosov, Marina Uspenskaya, and of artist and writer Georgy Kovenchuk.

In 1974, the magazine was awarded the Order of the Badge of Honour. The circulation of the magazine in 1974 was 5.6 mln copies.

In 1982, the magazine's circulation was 6 million per month, the price of one magazine was 15 kopecks.

In 2011, the magazine was listed by the Guinness World Records as the longest running children's magazine in the world.
