= Konstantin Bromberg =

Soviet-Russian-American film director and author

Konstantin Bromberg (October 17, 1935 – January 10, 2020) was a Soviet, Russian and American film director, author of children's and musical films, Honored Artist of the Russian Federation (1996), laureate of the USSR State Prize (1982) for the film The Adventures of the Elektronic.

Interred at the Adat Shalom Memorial Park, Livonia, Michigan, United States.
