= List of Soviet films of 1985 =

Title	Russian title	Director	Cast	Genre	Notes
1985
After the Rain, on Thursday	После дождичка в четверг	Mikhail Yuzovskiy	Vladislav Toldykov, Alexey Voytyuk	Fantasy	
Bambi's Childhood	Детство Бемби	Natalya Bondarchuk	Ivan Burlyaev, Nikolay Burlyaev, Natalya Bondarchuk	Family	
Battle of Moscow	Битва за Москву	Yuri Ozerov	Mikhail Ulyanov	War film	Soviet-East German-Czechoslovak-Vietnamese co-production
Confrontation	Противостояние	Semyon Aranovich	Oleg Basilashvili, Andrei Boltnev	Drama	
Coordinates of Death	Координаты смерти	Samvel Gasparov, Nguyen Xuan Chan	Aleksandr Galibin, Le Van, Dang Le Viet Bao, Tatyana Lebedeva, Yuriy Nazarov	War film	Soviet-Vietnamese co-production
Come and See	Иди и смотри	Elem Klimov	Aleksei Kravchenko, Olga Mironova	War film	Won the Golden Prize at Moscow. Was selected as the Soviet entry for the Best Foreign Language Film at the 58th Academy Awards, but was not accepted as a nominee.
Dangerous for Your Life!	Опасно для жизни	Leonid Gaidai	Leonid Kuravlev, Georgy Vitsin, Larisa Udovichenko, Vladimir Nosik, Tatyana Kravchenko, Tamaz Toloraya	Comedy	
Day of Wrath	День гнева	Sulambek Mamilov	Juozas Budraitis	Horror	
The Detached Mission	Одиночное плавание	Mikhail Tumanishvili	Mikhail Nozhkin, Aleksandr Fatyushin	War film	
Do Not Marry, Girls	Не ходите, девки, замуж	Yevgeni Gerasimov	Vyacheslav Nevinny, Tatyana Dogileva, Victor Pavlov, Yuriy Nazarov, Lyubov Sokolova, Natalya Vavilova	Musical	
Farewell of a Slav Woman	Прощание славянки	Yevgeny Vasilev	Galina Makarova, Yevgeni Lebedev, Yuriy Nazarov	Drama	
Flight	Рейс 222	Sergei Mikaelyan	Larisa Polyakova	Drama	
Gunpowder	Порох	Viktor Aristov	Yury Belyayev, Svetlana Bragarnik, Lyubov Kalyuzhnaya	Drama	
Guest from the Future (TV)	Гостья из будущего	Pavel Arsenov	Natalya Guseva, Aleksei Fomkin	Science-fiction	
Legal Marriage	Законный брак	Albert S. Mkrtchyan	Natalya Belokhvostikova, Igor Kostolevskiy, Albina Matveyeva	Drama	
Man with an Accordion	Человек с аккордеоном	Nikolay Dostal	Valeriy Zolotukhin, Irina Alfyorova, Arina Aleynikova	Drama	
Personal file of Judge Ivanova	Личное дело судьи Ивановой	Ilya Frez	Natalya Gundareva	Drama	
Primary Russia	Русь изначальная	Gennady Vasilyev	Lyudmila Chursina, Boris Nevzorov, Innokenty Smoktunovsky	Drama	
Sincerely Yours...	Искренне Ваш…	Alla Surikova	Vitali Solomin, Vera Glagoleva, Viktor Ilichyov	Comedy	
Snake Catcher	Змеелов	Vadim Derbenyov	Aleksandr Mikhaylov, Natalya Belokhvostikova, Leonid Markov	Crime drama	
Sofia Kovalevskaya	Софья Ковалевская	Ayan Shakhmaliyeva	Elena Safonova		
Start All Over Again	Начни сначала	Alexander Stefanovich	Andrey Makarevich, Maryana Polteva, Igor Sklyar	Drama	
The Journey of a Young Composer	Путешествие молодого композитора	Georgiy Shengelaya	Gia Peradze, Levan Abashidze	Comedy, drama	Was entered into the Berlin IFF where Shengelaya won the Silver Bear for Best Director.
The Legend of Suram Fortress	Легенда о Сурамской крепости	Dodo Abashidze, Sergei Parajanov	Leila Alibegashvili, Zurab Kipshidze, Dodo Abashidze, Sofiko Chiaureli, Levan Uchaneishvili	Drama	
The Most Charming and Attractive	Самая обаятельная и привлекательная	Gerald Bezhanov	Irina Muravyova, Tatyana Vasileva, Aleksandr Abdulov, Leonid Kuravlyov	Comedy	
The Sunday Daddy	Воскресный папа	Naum Birman	Dmitriy Grankin, Yuriy Duvanov, Tamara Akulova	Drama	
To Marry a Captain	Выйти замуж за капитана	Vitaliy Melnikov	Vera Glagoleva, Viktor Proskurin, Vera Vasileva	Comedy	
Trees Grow on the Stones Too	И на камнях растут деревья	Stanislav Rostotsky, Knut Andersen	Aleksandr Timoshkin, Petronella Barker, Tor Stokke	Drama	
Trips on an Old Car	Поездки на старом автомобиле	Pyotr Fomenko	Lyudmila Maksakova, Andrei Boltnev, Tatyana Nikitina	Comedy	
My Friend Ivan Lapshin	Мой друг Иван Лапшин	Aleksei German	Andrei Boltnev, Nina Ruslanova, Andrei Mironov, Aleksei Zharkov	Crime drama	
A Simple Death	Простая смерть	Alexander Kaidanovsky	Valeriy Priyomykhov, Alisa Freindlich	Drama	Screened at the 1987 Cannes Film Festival
Valentin and Valentina	Валентин и Валентина	Georgy Natanson	Marina Zudina, Nikolay Stotskiy, Tatyana Doronina	Drama	
Victory	Победа	Yevgeny Matveyev	Yevgeny Matveyev, Andrei Mironov, Mikhail Ulyanov, Natalya Vavilova	Drama	
Two Tickets to India	Два билета в Индию	Roman Kachanov	Alexander Kaidanovsky	Animation	
Winter Cherry	Зимняя вишня	Igor Maslennikov	Yelena Safonova, Vitaly Solomin, Ivars Kalniņš, Nina Ruslanova, Larisa Udovichenko, Alexander Lenkov	Romantic comedy	
Winter Evening in Gagra	Зимний вечер в Гаграх	Karen Shakhnazarov	Yevgeniy Yevstigneyev, Aleksandr Pankratov-Chyornyy, Natalya Gundareva, Sergei Nikonenko	Musical	
