= Guest from the Future (disambiguation) =

Guest from the Future is a Soviet television miniseries.

Guest from the Future may also refer to:

- The English name of the 2024 Russian film One Hundred Years Ahead
- Guests from the Future, a Russian dance-pop group that existed from 1996 to 2009.

== See also ==
- Time travel in fiction § Communication from the future
