= Przybylak =

Przybylak is a Polish-language surname. Notable people with this surname include:

- Daria Przybylak, (born 1991) Polish volleyball player
- Rajmund Przybylak, Polish geographer and climatologist

== See also ==
- Katya Prizhbilyak, child actress playing Alisa Selezneva in film Island of Rusty General
