= Pavel Arsenov =

Russian actor and film director

- Born: Pavel Oganezovich Arsenov; 5 January 1936; Tiflis, Transcaucasian Republic, Soviet Union
- Died: 12 August 1999 (aged 63); Moscow, Russia
- Other name: Pavel Arsenoff
- Occupations: film director, actor, screenwriter
- Years active: 1962 — 1994

Pavel Oganezovich Arsenov (Russian: Павел Оганезович Арсе́нов; 1936 — 1999) was a Soviet and Russian film actor, screenwriter and film director. Honored Artist of the Russian Federation (1996).

== Biography ==
Pavel was born on 5 January 1936 in Tiflis. He studied at the Institute of Geological Survey and graduated from the directing department of VGIK (1963, workshop of Grigori Roshal).

Before studying at VGIK, he worked at the Kartuli Pilmi, the Moscow studio of popular science films. He acted in a number of films of the studio Armenfilm, in particular, in the film Voices of Our Quarter (director Yuri Yerzinkyan).

Since 1962 he was the director of the Gorky Film Studio. A vivid event was the avant-garde film King Stag. The greatest popularity to film director Pavel Arsenov was brought by the 5-serial children's television movie Guest from the Future, which appeared on screens in March 1985. After that, Alisa Seleznyova's film character, created by Arsenov and embodied on the screen of a 12-year-old Moscow schoolgirl Natasha Guseva, became a cult for millions of Soviet schoolchildren.

Arsenov died 12 August 1999 in Moscow. He was buried at the Shcherbinskoye Cemetery in Moscow.

== Filmography ==
- 1963 — Sunflower (Russian: Подсолнух; short)
- 1966 — Lyolka (Russian: Лёлька; short)
- 1967 — Save the Drowning Man (Russian: Спасите утопающего)
- 1969 — King Stag (Russian: Король-олень)
- 1973 — And then I Said No ... (Russian: И тогда я сказал нет…)
- 1975 — Taste of Halva (Russian: Вкус халвы)
- 1977 — Confusion of Feelings (Russian: Смятение чувств)
- 1978 — Hello, River (Russian: Здравствуй, река; together with Yuri Grigoriev and Igor Yasulovich)
- 1979 — Do Not Part with Your Beloved (Russian: С любимыми не расставайтесь)
- 1985 — Guest from the Future (Russian: Гостья из будущего)
- 1985 — Lilac Ball (Russian: Лиловый шар)
- 1994 — The Wizard of the Emerald City (Russian: Волшебник Изумрудного города)

== Personal life ==
The first wife (from 1963 to 1969) was actress Valentina Malyavina. The second wife (since 1976) — Elena Arsenova. Daughter Elizaveta (born 1980) works as a make-up stylist in Moscow theaters.
