= The beautiful afar =

Russian colloquialism

The beautiful afar (Russian: прекра́сное далёко) is a "winged expression" (i.e. a catchphrase or a phraseme) in the Russian language. It was first used by Nikolai Gogol in the novel Dead Souls, published in 1842. The expression humorously and/or ironically refers to a possibly fictitious place where a person is free of routine burdens and problems.

== History ==
Dead Souls was mostly written while Gogol was residing abroad, mainly in Italy and Germany, but also in France, Switzerland, and Austria. In one of the novel's lyrical digressions, in the second chapter of the first volume, the author exclaims: "Rus'! Rus’! It's you that I see, from my wonderful, beautiful afar, I see YOU." These lines were written in Italy.

Israeli Slavist Mikhail Weiskopf remarked:

"The Beautiful Afar" from which Gogol paints spiritualized Rus', is primarily Italy, the homeland of the Raphael, whom he worshiped.

— Mikhail Weiskopf, "Gogol's story. Morphology. Ideology. Context", Publisher: RadixBooks, 1993; Page 410; ISBN 5-86463-004-7

Vissarion Belinsky, criticized Gogol's book Selected Passages from Correspondence with Friends alleging that Gogol, while living in emigration, had lost the understanding of Russia: "...for so many years you have become accustomed to looking at Russia from your 'beautiful afar', and it is well known that there is nothing easier than to see objects from afar as we want to see them."

== In popular culture ==
Yuri Entin (text) and Yevgeny Krylatov (music) wrote a song "The Beautiful Afar" for the children's science fiction TV film series Guest from the Future.
