= Premonition of Love =

- Russian: Предчувствие любви
- Directed by: Tofik Shakhverdiev
- Written by: Tofik Shakhverdiev; Valeriy Zelenskiy
- Starring: Aleksandr Abdulov; Irina Alfyorova; Mikhail Gluzskiy; Vladimir Basov; Tatyana Kravchenko
- Cinematography: Grigoriy Belenkiy
- Edited by: N. Veselovskaya
- Music by: Mikael Tariverdiev
- Release date: 1982
- Running time: 68 minute
- Country: Soviet Union
- Language: Russian

Premonition of Love (Russian: Предчувствие любви) is a 1982 Soviet romantic comedy film directed by Tofik Shakhverdiev.

== Plot ==
The film tells about a young inventor by the name of Sergey, who is in search of love and suddenly falls in love with a modest and charming Lena.

== Cast ==
- Aleksandr Abdulov as Sergey Vishnyakov
- Irina Alfyorova as Yelena
- Mikhail Gluzskiy as Ivan Kryukov
- Vladimir Basov as Vasya
- Tatyana Kravchenko as Olga
- Roma Merkulov
- Igor Yasulovich
- Mikhail Svetin
- Georgiy Strokov
- Lidiya Smirnova as Mariya Georgiyevna
