= Nosik =

Nosik (Russian: Носик) is a gender-neutral Russian surname. The word "носик" literally means "little nose" in Russian. Notable people with this surname include:

- Anton Nosik, Russian journalist, social activist and blogger.
- Valery Nosik (1940–1995), Russian film and stage actor,
- Vladimir Nosik (born 1948), Russian actor
