= Alisa's Birthday =

- Official poster
- Directed by: Sergey Seryogin
- Written by: Kir Bulychev (story); Andrey Zhitkov; Andrey Salomatov; Sergey Seryogin
- Produced by: Vyacheslav Mayasov; Aleksandr Gerasimov
- Music by: Dmitriy Rybnikov
- Distributed by: Master-film
- Release date: February 12, 2009
- Running time: 90 minutes
- Country: Russia
- Language: Russian
- Budget: 60 mln rub (US$2 million)

Alisa's Birthday (Russian: Де́нь рожде́ния Али́сы, translit. Den' rozhdeniya Alisy) is a 2009 Russian traditionally animated children's science fiction film, directed by Sergey Seryogin and produced by Master-film studio. The film is based on a novella of the same name by Kir Bulychev about Alisa Seleznyova, a teenage girl from the future. It is a spiritual successor to 1981 animated film The Mystery of the Third Planet, from which it draws a heavy influence.

== Plot ==
Alisa Seleznyova joins an archeological expedition to the dead planet of Coleida. There are well-preserved cities from the past, yet all of planet's inhabitants had died centuries ago due to an unknown plague.

Using a time-travelling device, Alisa and an alien scientist, Rrrr, who greatly resembles a cat, travel to the planet's past, to the day the plague began. They find themselves in a world that resembles 20th century Earth, the Soviet Union in particular. Coleidians are expecting the return of their cosmonauts from their first trip to another planet. Alisa realizes that the cosmonauts were the cause of the plague, and decides to prevent it.

Through numerous obstacles, she comes close to the returned spaceship and uses a disinfection spray to prevent plague from spreading. To Coleidian police, it looks like an assault, so they catch Alisa and imprison her. With Rrrr's help, she's able to escape and return to the future. Upon arrival, they find that the future changed and Coleida is no more a dead planet, but a flourishing civilisation.

== Cast ==
- Yasya Nikolaeva as Alisa Seleznyova
- Alexey Kolgan as Gromozeka / magician
- Yevgeny Stychkin as Rrrr, Professor
- Natalya Murashkevich (married name of Natalya Guseva, the original Alisa) as captain of the spaceship
- Roman Staburov as Stepan / Doctor Tuk
- Mark Cernavin as Bolo
- Nikolay Lazarev as Seleznev, professor, father of Alisa
- Alexey Kuznetsov as Shepherd / Speaker
- Elena Gabets as Grandma Tolo
- Anatoly Vologdin as speaking diary / railwaymen / policemen
- Anna Glazkova as teacher / mom Bolo
- George Muradyan as twins
- Sergey Gabrielyan is a kiosk
- Victoria Radunskaya as the old lady in the window
- Dmitry Kurt as cat catchers / railwaymen / policemen
- Anatoly Vologdin, Mikhail Lebedev as railroad / police officers

== Production ==
Roughly one third of the film's 60 million ruble budget was provided by the Russian government.

The film premiered in Star City, Russia on February 12, 2009. It was widely released in Russia on February 19 with 250 film prints.

Some of the scenes were done using Flash animation. The part of Gromozeka was played by Aleksey Kolgan, who is also the Russian voice of Shrek. Natalya Guseva, who played Alisa in the 1985 live-action TV series Guest from the Future, has a minor role as the spaceship captain.

Script Editor - Natalya Abramova. Art Director — Sergey Gavrilov.

== Reception ==
Alisa's Birthday was met with mixed reviews. It was praised as a faithful adaptation and for following the traditions of The Mystery of the Third Planet, as Alisa's Birthday characters' design was largely based on that film. Yet many critics were disappointed with the film's visual style and soundtrack. Mir Fantastiki called the film a nostalgic reprise of Soviet science fiction that tries to catch up to modern children.
