= One Hundred Years Ahead =

2024 science fiction film

One Hundred Years Ahead Guest from the Future
- Theatrical release poster
- Directed by: Alexander Andryushchenko
- Screenplay by: Andrey Zolotarev; Alexander Andryushchenko; Ksenia Miroshnik
- Story by: Kir Bulychev
- Based on: One Hundred Years Ahead (ru) by Kir Bulychev
- Produced by: Mikhail Vrubel; Alexander Andryushchenko; Fyodor Bondarchuk; Denis Baglai; Vadim Vereschagin; Anton Zlatopolsky; Vyacheslav Murugov; Yuliana Slashcheva; Antonina Lee; Pavel Gorin; Elena Bystrova; Daria Chigirinova
- Starring: Daria Vereshchagina; Mark Eydelshteyn; Kirill Mitrofanov; Alexander Petrov; Yura Borisov; Viktoriya Isakova; Konstantin Khabenskiy; Fyodor Bondarchuk
- Cinematography: Mikhail Milashin
- Edited by: Alexey Starchenko; Alexander Puzyryov
- Music by: Igor Vdovin
- Production companies: Vodorod Film Company; Art Pictures Studio; Central Partnership Productions; Russia-1; National Media Group; Okko; Soyuzmultfilm; Cinema Fund
- Distributed by: Central Partnership
- Release dates: April 14, 2024 (Karo 11 October); April 18, 2024 (Russia)
- Running time: 142 minutes
- Country: Russia
- Language: Russian
- Budget: ₽900 million
- Box office: ₽1.532 billion

One Hundred Years Ahead, also in English territories titled as Guest from the Future (Russian: Сто лет тому вперёд, romanized: Sto let tomu vperyod, lit. 'One Hundred Years Ahead') is a 2024 Russian teen science fiction film directed by Alexander Andryushchenko, loosely based on the 1978 Soviet novel of the same name by Kir Bulychev from the cycle about Alice Selezneva. The main roles were played by Daria Vereshchagina and Mark Eydelshteyn. The novel was adapted as a five-part television miniseries Guest from the Future made in the Soviet Union, which aired in March 1985.

One Hundred Years Ahead had its world premiere at the Karo 11 October at Arbat Square in Moscow on March 14, 2024, and was released in the Russian Federation on April 18, 2024 by Central Partnership.

== Plot ==
In the near future, Earth joins the Space Federation, accelerating progress but also drawing it into a war with a pirate alliance led by a villain named Glot. The pirates possess a substance called "Cosmion", which allows them to travel back in time to alter battles. Kira Selezneva, mother of Alice and wife of a professor, defeats Glot but, to prevent the Cosmion from falling into pirate hands, she travels 100 years into the past, hiding the Cosmion and starting a new life as a teacher. Alice, believing her mother is alive, trains to enter the cadet corps to find her.

In 2024, students Kolya Gerasimov and Fima Korolev discover the hidden Cosmion in Kira's classroom. When Kolya accidentally activates it, he is transported to 2124, where he meets Alice. Together, they uncover the truth about the Cosmion and Kira's fate. Meanwhile, the pirate Jolly Man U breaks into Glot's prison, revealing Glot's plans to capture the Cosmion.

As tensions rise, Glot uses his powers to manipulate Kolya into attempting to kill the professor, but the situation spirals out of control, sending Kolya, Alice, and others back to 2024. They must navigate challenges, including battling Jolly Man U and attempting to activate the Cosmion to escape from pirates who have turned Earth into a stronghold.

In a climactic showdown, Glot's past and future selves meet, creating a paradox that leads to his demise. Kolya revives Alice, asserting that their friends can still defeat the pirates. After successfully altering the timeline, Kolya writes a warning letter for the professor to avoid his demise, ensuring Alice's family reunites. The film ends with Kolya and his friends planting a tree as a symbol of hope, with Alice receiving a message from Kolya in the future.

== Cast ==
- Daria Vereshchagina as Alice Selezneva (also tr. Alisa Seleznyova)
- Mark Eydelshteyn as Nikolai 'Kolya' Gerasimov
- Kirill Mitrofanov as Efim 'Fima' Korolev, Kolya Gerasimov's friend and classmate
- Alexander Petrov as Jolly Man U, a space pirate (also tr. Veselchak U)
- Yura Borisov as Glot, the villain
- Viktoriya Isakova as Kira Selezneva / Margarita, Alice Selezneva's mother
- Konstantin Khabenskiy as Professor Seleznev, Alice Selezneva's father
- Fyodor Bondarchuk as Robot Werther (voice)
- Sofia Tsibireva as Anastasia 'Nastya' Altukhina, Kolya Gerasimov's classmate
- Matvey Astrakhantsev as Victor 'Vitya', Nastya Altukhina's boyfriend
- Maria Maykova-Slidovker as Victoria Gerasimova, Kolya Gerasimov's mother
- Valentin Moiseev as Kolya Gerasimov's father
- Lev Zulkarnaev as the space courier
- Polina Romanova as Alice Selezneva's teacher

=== English dubbing ===
- Kayli Mills as Alice Selezneva (voice)
- Chris Wei Lewis as Kolya Gerasimov (voice)
- Caleb Yen as Efim Korolev (voice)
- Jason Charles Miller as Veselchak U (voice)
- Khoi Dao as Glot (voice)
- Caitlyn Elizabeth as Kira Selezneva (voice)
- Kaiji Tang as Igor Seleznev (voice)
- Crystal Lee as Nastya Altukhina (voice)
- Alex Bankier as Vitya (voice)
- Daman Mills as Atmospheric Voices (voice)

== Production ==
The story was first published in 1978, and four years later the first film adaptation of the work was released in slide show format. The most popular adaptation of the book was Pavel Arsenov’s 5-episode television film Guest from the Future, in which Natalya Guseva played the main role.

The producer of the film Invasion, Mikhail Vrubel, first announced his desire to make a film in early January 2020. Initially, Egor Baranov was supposed to become the director of the project, but in the end this post was taken by Alexander Andryushchenko. The cameraman is Mikhail Milashin, the project is produced by Mikhail Vrubel, Fyodor Bondarchuk and Vadim Vereshchagin.

=== Filming ===
Principal photography began on November 2, 2022, in Moscow, and the region of Moscow Oblast. At the end of December 2022, the first teaser of the project was published.

== Release ==
One Hundred Years Ahead was scheduled to be theatrically released on December 28, 2023, but was later postponed to April 18, 2024.

=== Marketing ===
The first teaser trailer of One Hundred Years Ahead was released on April 18, 2023.

== Reception ==
=== Box office ===
In the first weekend, the film topped the Russian box office, collecting 309.2 million rubles, it was the sixth best start of 2024 at that time. After the first 10 days of release, the box office exceeded 600 million rubles.

== Awards and nominations ==
The film’s trailer was featured at the 24th Golden Trailer Awards and won in the category of Best Foreign Action Trailer. It was also nominated for Best Foreign Music Trailer, but lost to the teaser trailer for another Russian film, Major Grom: The Game.

By the end of the year, the film received four nominations at the Russian Nika Award ceremony in the categories of Best Supporting Actor (Yura Borisov, Alexander Petrov), Best Production Designer (Vladislav Ogay), and Best Costume Designer (Aleksandra Aronova, Tatyana Dolmatovskaya).

Cinematographer Mikhail Milashin was nominated for the White Square award of the Russian Guild of Cinematographers in the category of Best Cinematography in a Feature Film.

Casting director Irina Lavrentieva won the Casting Directors' Guild of Russia Puzzle Award in the category of Best Ensemble Cast in a Motion Picture.
