= 31 June =

1978 film

- 31 iyunya
- Screenplay by: Nina Fomina; Leonid Kvinikhidze
- Story by: J. B. Priestley
- Directed by: Leonid Kvinikhidze
- Starring: Nikolai Yeremenko Jr. Natalia Trubnikova; Vladimir Zeldin; Vladimir Etush; Lyubov Polishchuk
- Music by: Aleksandr Zatsepin
- Country of origin: Soviet Union
- Original language: Russian

Production
- Cinematography: Ilya Minkovetsky
- Editors: Inessa Brozhovskaya; S. Manovtseva
- Running time: 142 minutes
- Production company: Mosfilm

Original release
- Release: 1978

31 June (Russian: 31 июня, romanized: 31 iyunya) is a two-part fantasy TV musical, loosely based on a story by J. B. Priestley. The film premiered in the USSR in 1978.

The film was conceived and developed by Leonid Kvinikhidze and Aleksandr Zatsepin. It was archived for over ten years after its premiere, because Alexander Godunov, a famous ballet dancer in the Bolshoi Theatre and one of the film's leads, requested political asylum in the United States.

== Plot ==
The film takes place simultaneously in 12th and 21st centuries in England, on the fictional date of "31 June, lunar day".

Meliot, king of Peradore, is looking for a husband for his daughter, princess Melicent, but she keeps rejecting all her suitors. An evil warlock, Malgrim, tries to bribe Melicent with a future suitor in exchange for Merlin's magical brooch, which can only be effective when passed on as a gift. Meanwhile, sometime on the thirtieth of June in the early twenty-first century, Sam Penty (said suitor), a resident artist in an advertisement agency, experiences a creative block concerning an image of a "stocking girl" for a commercial, which he must finish by the end of the day. Seeing Melicent in the mirror (as arranged by the warlock), Sam realizes that she is his "stocking girl" muse, and instantly falls in love. Malgrim arranges for a brief meeting between Melicent and Sam on the Milky Way, but breaks it up upon realization Melicent would not give up the brooch.

The good magician Marlogram tries to help the couple by sending Melicent to the twenty-first century, but Malgrim joins forces with a jealous pretender to the throne, Lady Ninette, to sabotage that plan by bringing Sam back to the twelfth century and locking him in jail. Lady Jane, the ghost of the Peradore castle, travels to the twenty-first century, to warn Melicent that Sam is in danger and bring her back. Melicent fences her way to freeing Sam, but the lunar day ends, scattering everyone back to their time. However, Melicent utilizes the one and only wish granted by Merlin himself, giving up her princess status and agreeing to forget everything related to Perador, only to be with Sam.

The epilogue shows Sam and Melicent, now married and without a shred of memory pertaining the film's events, taking a tour of the Peradore Museum. The curator, Malgrim, shows them the wax figures of the castle's inhabitants, tells that "they all died a long time ago, not from natural causes", vainly tries to trigger Melicent's memory, and sadly concludes that "it is a small museum, and it is only open one day a year – thirty first of June, lunar day". The camera then zooms in on a wax figure, presumably that of Malgrim, his face obscured by a mysterious scroll, and Merlin's brooch on his chest.

== Cast ==
- Natalia Trubnikova as Princess Melicent, king's daughter (vocal by Tatiana Antsiferova)
- Nikolai Yeremenko Jr. as Sam Penty, painter
- Vladimir Zeldin as Meliot, king of Peradore / Mr Dimmock, chief advertising agency
- Vladimir Etush as Malgrim, Master of black and white magic, Marlagram's nephew
- Lyudmila Vlasova as Lady Ninette, princess Melicent's lady-in-waiting / Ann, employee of an advertising agency (vocal by Larisa Dolina and Zhanna Rozhdestvenskaya)
- Alexander Godunov as Lamison, the Royal minstrel/ Bob Taylor (voice by Aleksei Zolotnitsky, vocal by Jaak Joala)
- Lyubov Polishchuk as Miss Queenie, hostess of "The black horse" (vocal by Zhanna Rozhdestvenskaya)
- Igor Yasulovich as Master Jarvie / Dr. Jarvis
- Marina Nud`ga as Lady Jane, ghost (vocal by Tatiana Antsiferova and Zhanna Rozhdestvenskaya)
- Mikhail Kokshenov as King Meliot's servant
- Emmanuil Geller as Marlagram, a wizard, Merlin's disciple and Malgrim's uncle
- Vladimir Soshalsky as Plunket, a skipper
