= Natalia Trubnikova =

Russian ballet dancer and actress (1955–2026)

- Наталья Трубникова
- Trubnikova in 31 June (1978)
- Born: 17 July 1955; Moscow, Soviet Union
- Died: 10 August 2026 (aged 71); Moscow, Russia
- Resting place: Vagankovo Cemetery
- Occupations: Ballet dancer, actress
- Years active: 1976–1994
- Spouse: Anatoly Kulakov

Natalia Yevgenievna Trubnikova (Russian: Наталья Евгеньевна Трубникова; 17 July 1955 – 10 August 2026) was a Russian ballerina and actress. She performed in the films 31 June, The Twelve Chairs, and Formula of Love.

== Life and career ==
Trubnikova was born in Moscow on 17 July 1955, to the family of an Arbitration Court employee. She graduated from the ballet department of the Russian Institute of Theatre Arts (GITIS), then performed on the stage of the Stanislavsky and Nemirovich-Danchenko Moscow Academic Musical Theatre. In film, she is best known for her leading role as Princess Melisent in Leonid Kvinikhidze's musical on 31 June.

Trubnikova died at her apartment on 10 August 2026, at the age of 71. She suffered from Parkinson's disease.
