= Vladimir Soshalsky =

Soviet and Russian actor (1929–2007)

- Владимир Сошальский
- Born: Vladimir Borisovich Soshalsky; 14 June 1929; Leningrad, USSR
- Died: 10 October 2007 (aged 78); Moscow, Russia
- Occupation: actor
- Years active: 1948–2007
- Awards: Honored Artist of the RSFSR People's Artist of the RSFSR

Vladimir Borisovich Soshalsky (Russian: Владимир Борисович Сошальский; 14 June 1929 in Leningrad, USSR — 10 October 2007 in Moscow, Russia) was a Soviet and Russian film and theater actor. People's Artist of the RSFSR (1988). Real name — Feodosyev.

== Biography ==
Born on 14 June 1929 in Leningrad in a family of actors Varvara Rozalion-Soshalskaya and Boris Feodosyev. He made his debut on the stage of the young Soshalsky accident: sparkle behind the scenes of the theater, went to the scene right at the time the play by Ibsen's Ghosts. Vladimir felt the magic of the scene and decided to become an actor. Even before graduating from high school he entered the studio of the Bryantsev Youth Theatre. It was at the Youth Theatre Vladimir Soshalsky played his first starring role Romeo.

Soon the fame reached the Russian Army Theatre. Enrolling to the service in 1951, Vladimir has not parted with the theater until his death.

The film debuted in 1949 in the film Academician Ivan Pavlov.

=== Personal life ===
The actor has been married five times. His wives were actresses Olga Aroseva, Alina Pokrovskaya, Nonna Mordyukova, Nelly Podgornaya, Nina Olkhina.

=== Death ===
Since the end of August 2007 the actor was in a hospice – he was diagnosed with prostate cancer, and relatives could not provide adequate care for the sick.

Vladimir Borisovich Soshalsky died on 10 October 2007. He was buried at the Troyekurovskoye Cemetery in Moscow, next to his mother (section No.3).

== Partial filmography ==
- Ivan Pavlov (Иван Павлов, 1949) as Student
- Taras Shevchenko (Тарас Шевченко, 1951) as Nikolay Montelli
- The Anna Cross (Анна на шее, 1954) as Officer (uncredited)
- Mikhaylo Lomonosov (Михайло Ломоносов, 1955) as Shuvalov
- Othello (Отелло, 1956) as Cassio
- Chelkash (Челкаш, 1957) as episode (uncredited)
- In the Ruins of the Count (На графских развалинах, 1958) as Count
- Sailor from the "Comet" (Матрос с «Кометы», 1958) as Vadim Alexandrovich
- Grigoriy Skovoroda (Григорий Сковорода, 1960) as Valet (uncredited)
- Moscow — Genoa (Москва — Генуя, 1964) as photojournalist (uncredited)
- The Squadron Goes West (Эскадра уходит на запад, 1965) as Grishin-Almazov
- Sūtņu sazvērestība (Заговор послов, 1966) as Sidney Reilly
- The Fire (Огонь, 1974) as German
- White Circle (Белый круг, 1975) as "Krupp"'s Representative
- 31 June (31 Июня, 1978, TV Movie) as Plunkett, skipper
- Unrequited Love (Безответная любовь, 1979) as Ayarov
- A Rogue's Saga (Прохиндиада, или Бег на месте, 1984) as Timofey Timofeevich
- Charlotte's Necklace (Колье Шарлотты, 1984) as Gubchenko
- Rough Landing (Грубая посадка, 1985) as Vasily Polozov
- Investigation Held by ZnaToKi: Midday Thief (Следствие ведут ЗнаТоКи. Полуденный вор, 1985, TV Series) as Alexey
- Man with an Accordion (Человек с аккордеоном, 1985) as Savely Mikhailovich
- Deal (Сделка, 1985) as President Suarez
- Beauty Saloon (Салон красоты, 1986) as Grigoryi Sergeyevich
- The Life of Klim Samgin (Жизнь Клима Самгина, 1988, TV Series) as Valentin Bezbedov
- New Adventures of a Yankee in King Arthur's Court (Новые приключения янки при дворе короля Артура, 1988) as Sagramor
- Investigation Held by ZnaToKi: Mafia (Следствие ведут ЗнаТоКи: Мафия, 1989, TV Series) as Opium Den Visitor
- Svetik (Светик, 1989) as Nikolai Stepanovich
- Mousetrap (Мышеловка, 1990) as Mr. Paravicini
- Viva Gardes-Marines! (Виват, гардемарины!, 1991) as Christian August, Prince of Anhalt-Zerbst
- Don't Wake a Sleeping Dog (Не будите спящую собаку, 1991) as actor
- Sin. Passion Story (Грех. История страсти, 1992) as Nikolai Arsenievich Lanskoy
- Hearts of Three (Сердца трёх, 1992) as blind robber
- A Rogue's Saga 2 (Прохиндиада 2, 1994) as Timofey Timofeevich
- Secrets of Palace Coups (Тайны дворцовых переворотов, 2000) as Pyotr Saltykov
