= Carnival (1981 film) =

- Russian: Карнавал
- Directed by: Tatyana Lioznova
- Written by: Anna Rodionova
- Starring: Irina Muravyova; Yury Yakovlev; Klara Luchko; Aleksandr Abdulov
- Cinematography: Pyotr Kataev
- Music by: Maksim Dunayevsky
- Production company: Gorky Film Studio
- Release date: 1981
- Running time: 151 minutes
- Country: Soviet Union
- Language: Russian

Carnival (Russian: Карнавал, romanized: Karnaval) is a 1981 Soviet musical comedy-drama film directed by Tatyana Lioznova.

== Plot ==
In a small Uralic city lives a young woman, Nina Solomatina, with her mother. Her father left her as a child and moved to Moscow. Dreaming study acting, Nina comes to Moscow, but fails the entrance examinations to the theatrical school. Deciding to try to enter next year, Nina temporarily moves in with her father and his family. Striving to provide for herself, she goes to work, but because of various incidents, she is not able to stay anywhere for a long time. In her personal life, Nina also suffers a fiasco – Muscovite student Nikita very quickly breaks up with her for a new girl. As a result, Nina begins to understand that the big city is not the eternal carnival she imagined it to be, and instead of conquering the world, the main heroine returns to her home – to care of her ill mother.

The film ends on an ambiguous note – Nina Solomatina appears as a famous singer performing at the full hall, it is not clear if all this is real, or just her imagination.

== Cast ==
- Irina Muravyova as Nina Solomatina (song by Zhanna Rozhdestvenskaya)
- Yury Yakovlev as Mikhail Solomatin, father of Nina
- Klara Luchko as Josephine Viktorovna, the wife of Mikhail Solomatin
- Aleksandr Abdulov as Nikita
- Vera Vasilyeva as Nikita's mother
- Alevtina Rumyantseva as mother of Nina
- Ekaterina Zhemchuzhnaya as Karma
- Alexander Mikhailov as Remizov
- Lidiya Smirnova as Chairman of the Commission
- Valentina Titova as landlady
- Zinaida Vorkul as Zinaida, Solomatin's mother
- Georgy Zhemchuzhny as Karma's husband
- Andrey Gusev as barking entrant with kefir
- Yelena Maksimova as visitor of the pawnshop
- Olga Blok-Mirimskaya as femme fatale from the movie in the cinema
- Vyacheslav Baranov as Zhenya
- Vadim Andreev as Vadim Arturovich
- Vladimir Balashov as member of the Admission Committee
- Vladimir Smirnov as neighbor who brought a table
- Roman Monastyrsky as Dima, Nina's paternal half-brother
- Margarita Zharova as conductor
- Claudia Kozlenkova as woman in the subway
- Anatoly Pidgorodetsky as entrant
- Tamara Yarenko as neighbor
- Yakov Belenky as neighbor

== Reception ==
Carnival was the ninth most popular film at the box-office in the Soviet Union in 1982; it was seen by 30,4 million viewers.

In the same year, for her leading performance, Irina Muravyova was recognized as the best actress according to the results of a survey of readers of the magazine Soviet Screen.
