= Gerald Bezhanov =

Russian film director and screenwriter (1940–2025)

Gerald Surenovich Bezhanov (Russian: Гера́льд Суре́нович Бежа́нов; 15 March 1940 – 30 October 2025) was a Soviet and Russian film director, screenwriter and producer. Among his films include The Most Charming and Attractive (1985) and Where is the Nophelet? (1988).

Bezhanov graduated from Tbilisi State University and the Gerasimov Institute of Cinematography. A member of the Union of Cinematographers of the Russian Federation, he became an Honoured Worker of the Arts Industry of the RSFSR in 1990 and received the Order of Friendship in 2010. Bezhanov died on 30 October 2025, at the age of 85.
