= Love Letters with Intent =

- Directed by: Zvonimir Berković
- Written by: Zvonimir Berković
- Starring: Zlatko Vitez; Irina Alfyorova; Kruno Šarić; Mustafa Nadarević; Relja Bašić; Siniša Popović; Eliza Gerner; Vera Zima
- Cinematography: Goran Trbuljak
- Edited by: Maja Virag-Rodica
- Production company: Croatia Film
- Release date: 27 June 1985
- Running time: 95 minutes
- Country: Yugoslavia
- Language: Serbo-Croatian

Love Letters with Intent (Croatian: Ljubavna pisma s predumišljajem) is a 1985 Yugoslav film directed by Zvonimir Berković.
