= Marina Dyuzheva =

Russian actress

Marina Mikhailovna Dyuzheva
- Марина Михайловна Дюжева
- Pronunciation: IPA: [mɐˈrʲinə ˈdʲuʐɨvə]
- Born: Marina Mikhailovna Kukushkina; October 9, 1955 (age 71); Moscow, Russian SFSR, USSR
- Occupation: Actress
- Years active: 1978–present
- Known for: Theater and film
- Spouses: Nicholay Dyuzhev (m. 1975; div. 1978) Yuri Geiko (m. 1983)
- Children: 2
- Website: Marina Dyuzheva at IMDb

Marina Mikhailovna Dyuzheva (Russian: Мари́на Миха́йловна Дю́жева, IPA: [mɐˈrʲinə ˈdʲuʐɨvə]; née Kukushkina; born October 9, 1955) is a Soviet and Russian film and stage actress.

== Biography ==
Marina Dyuzheva graduated in 1976 from the Russian Academy of Theatre Arts. She was an actress in both theater and film from 1978 to 1997.

She has had roles in more than fifty films. Early in her career she acted under her maiden name, Kukushkina. She met her first husband, Nicholas Dyuzhev, the son of an influential official at the Ministry of Culture, while studying at the Academy; however, this marriage quickly disintegrated.

In 1994, Marina Dyuzheva was invited to dub the French series Helen and the Boys, and she continued this kind of work in other foreign films. In the 1996 and 1997 seasons of the game show The Keys to Fort Boryard, she voiced the female host, Sandrine Dominguez.

== Personal life ==
- Married her first husband, Nicholay Dyuzhev, in 1975 and divorced in 1978
- Married her second husband, writer, journalist, radio host and driving instructor Yuri Geiko on February 4, 1983.
  - Son Mikhail, born October 9, 1981
  - Son Gregory, born August 28, 1986

== Works ==
=== Filmography ===
Year	Film	Role
1974	At A Boyish Eighteen Years	Valya
1974	Think of Me As an Adult	Unknown
1974	Secret City	Pioneer leader
1975	Another Wedding	Asya
1976	Trainee	Katya Savelieva
1976	Townspeople	Masha
1977	For Family Reasons	Lida
1977	Mimino	Svetlana Georgievna, lawyer (mistakenly credited as Maria Dyuzheva)
1977	Relatives	Unknown
1978	The Tavern on Pyatnitskaya	Alenka
1978	Urgent Call	Xenia
1978	The Front for the Front Line	Katya
1978	Risk: A Noble Cause	Natasha
1979	Time Has Chosen Us	Masha, radio operator
1979	At The End of Summer	Nurse Vera
1980	National Border: We Are Ours, We Are New...	Nina Alekseevna Danovich
1980	Father and Son	Praskovya Tikhonov Skobeeva, teacher
1980	You Must Live	Oksana
1980	A Shot in the Back	Rita
1980	Key	Anya, wife of Valery
1981	Honest, Intelligent, Single	Katya
1981	Theft of the Century	Barbara Eryomina
1981	Girl and Grand	Marina Koşevaya
1982	For Happiness	Katya
1982	The Pokrovsky Gate	Anna Adamovna, graduate student
1983	Young People	Galya
1984	Zudov, You're Fired!	Elena Vasilevna
1985	My Choice	Valentina
1985	Malevolent Sunday	Nina Grigorievna
1985	Kalman's Riddle/Az élet muzsikája - Kálmán	Imre
1985	City Over Master	Liza
1986	How to Become Happy	Zoe, wife of Gosha
1987	Tumble Through the Head	Anna Ivanovna, head of the school
1988	Where is the Nophelet?	Marina
1988	One Day in December	Natashka/Katka/Maya
1990	The Arbat Motive	Olga
1991	Тень, или Может быть, всё обойдётся (untranslatable)	Princess
1995	Moscow Holidays	Grisha's ex-wife (in the credits as Maria)
1995	Without A Collar	Gudkov
1996	Impotent	Masha
2000	The Envy of the Gods	Unknown
2002	A Friendly Little Family	Maria Potykaeva
2002	Arrow of Love	Irina Mikhailovna
2007	Pastries with Potato	Anna
2008	The Story of Love, or A New Year's Joke	Mama Pauline
2008	Daddy's Daughters	Pianist Violetta
2009	Mine	Lyudmila Petrovna Sveshnikov
2009	Blood Is Not Water	Elena Kulikova, mother of Anna and Masha
2010	White Dress	Aunt Masha
2011	Cupid	Lyudmila Arkadevna Odintsov, Victoria's mother
2012	My Favorite Genius	Marina Petrovna, Misha's mother
2012	Jungle	Lubov, mother of Marina
2013	People's Doctor: The Return	Vera
2013	Family Circumstances	Irina Lyubochkina
2014	Son to Father	Vadima, foster mother
2014	Exclusion Zone	Zinaida
2016	My Favorite In-Law	Olga

=== Television series ===
- 1988: Objective Circumstances — Irina Antipova

=== Cartoon Voices ===
- 2005: The Story of One Frog's Love

=== Documentary Films ===
- 2009: A Whole-Hearted Confession (documentary biopic dedicated to the work of Igor Starygin)

=== Theater Roles ===
==== Independent Theater Project ====
- "Fierce Dance" (based on the novel They Shoot Horses, Don't They?) - Mary
- "Boing Boing" - M. Kamoletti — Berta
- "Calendar Girls" - T. Ferta — Ruth

==== Theatrical Production Center "Rusart" ====
- "Five Nights" - Alexander Volodin - Zoe

==== Theatrical Marathon ====
- "Dear Pamela" (based on the play by John Patrick) — Pamela Cronk
