= The Beautiful Afar (song) =

Russian song; Theme song for "Guest from the Future"

"Прекрасное далёко"

Song
- Language: Russian
- English title: The Beautiful Afar
- Written: 1984
- Released: 1985
- Composer(s): Yevgeny Krylatov
- Lyricist(s): Yuri Entin

"The Beautiful Afar" (Russian: Прекрасное далёко) is a Russian song by composer Yevgeny Krylatov with lyrics by poet Yuri Entin. It gained popularity after the release of the television series "Guest from the Future" in 1985, where it was first performed. The song title is the Russian catchphrase "the beautiful afar".

== Background ==
Yevgeny Krylatov and Yuri Entin began their collaboration in 1969, and by 1984, they had established a strong creative partnership while working on various animation and film projects. That year, they wrote the song "The Beautiful Afar" for the Soviet children's sci-fi miniseries "Guest from the Future". The song is featured once, at the end of the fifth episode, and sung by Tatyana Daskovskaya.

After the series aired on Soviet television in late March 1985, Krylatov proposed that the popular vocal trio "Meridian" record the song. Their rendition was included in the program Song-85 and earned recognition as the laureate of its annual contest.

== Lyrics sample ==
Russian original	Transliteration	English translation
Слышу голос из прекрасного далёко Голос утренний в серебряной росе Слышу голос, и манящая дорога Кружит голову, как в детстве карусель Прекрасное далёко, не будь ко мне жестоко Не будь ко мне жестоко, жестоко не будь От чистого истока в прекрасное далёко В прекрасное далёко я начинаю путь	Slyshu golos iz prekrasnogo dalyoka Golos utrenniy v serebryanoy rose Slyshu golos, i manyashchaya doroga Kruzhit golovu, kak v detstve karusel Prekrasnoye dalyoko, ne bud' ko mne zhestoko Ne bud' ko mne zhestoko, zhestoko ne bud' Ot chistogo istoka v prekrasnoye dalyoko V prekrasnoye dalyoko ya nachinayu put'	I hear a voice from the beautiful afar A morning voice in the silver dew I hear a voice, and an alluring road Spins my head like a carousel in childhood Beautiful afar, don't be cruel to me Don't be cruel to me, don't be cruel From a pure source to the beautiful afar To the beautiful afar, I begin my journey

== Reception ==
The series featuring the song was released in the year perestroika began. Seven years later, the Soviet Union collapsed. Since then, the song has been perceived in Russia as a requiem for a longed-for future that turned out to be cruel.

Speaking about the song in 2002, Krylatov said, "It's a call, a prayer, a plea for children to live better than we do."
