= How to Become Happy =

- Directed by: Yuri Chulyukin
- Written by: Georgiy Kushnirenko; Yuri Chulyukin
- Starring: Nikolai Karachentsov; Marina Dyuzheva; Lev Durov
- Cinematography: Evgeniy Guslinsky
- Music by: Vladimir Dashkevich
- Production company: Mosfilm
- Release date: 1986
- Running time: 89 minutes
- Country: Soviet Union
- Language: Russian

How to Become Happy (Russian: Как стать счастливым, romanized: Kak stat schastlivym) is a 1986 Soviet comedy-science fiction film directed by Yuri Chulyukin.

== Plot ==
In 1980, a modest physics teacher in the small town of Lesogorsk invents a miraculous device that can identify a child's potential talents and aptitude for various professions. He travels to Moscow to share his invention, but those he approaches react skeptically. Gosha, a photojournalist for a Moscow newspaper, initially seizes on the opportunity for a sensational story. However, when the inventor assesses Gosha’s own talents and reveals he is destined to be a clown rather than the great writer he dreams of becoming, Gosha reacts negatively and rejects the inventor.

Ten years later, a surprising wave of talented young people from Lesogorsk rises to fame across the country and even internationally. These talented individuals—artists, athletes, scientists, and craftsmen—all seem to share the same hometown. Now the head of his newspaper's department, yet unsuccessful in his career, Gosha once again pursues this story. His investigation leads him back to the scientist from Lesogorsk. Gosha learns that the inventor’s analysis of his wife had also been accurate; she discovered her talent for sculpture and found success, which the inventor had foreseen during a secret scan while she slept.

Upon discovering that the scan of his own son's talents was accidentally destroyed by the boy himself, Gosha urgently searches for the inventor, only to find that he has died, dismantling his invention before his death. At a ceremony honoring the scientist in Lesogorsk, Gosha, inspired by the memory of the inventor, decides to change his life, even if it means doing so at an older age.

== Cast ==
- Nikolai Karachentsov — Gosha
- Marina Dyuzheva — Zoya, Gosha's wife
- Lev Durov — old man-inventor
- Vladimir Shevelkov — Slava
- Yelena Valyushkina — Lida
- Tatyana Pelttser — Lida's grandmother
- Kirill Golovko-Sersky — Vovik, son of Gosha and Zoya
- Victor Filippov — Uncle Borya
- Semyon Farada — Kolobok
- Ion Ungureanu — Director of the Brain Institute Dmitry Sergeevich
- Lyudmila Chulyukina — Raechka
- Vsevolod Shilovsky — editor-in-chief
- Sergey Balabanov — Misha
- Igor Yasulovich — speaker at the opening of the monument
- Alexander Maslyakov — presenter of the contest
- Vadim Aleksandrov — editorial officer of Bald
- Vladimir Nosik — fellow of the Brain Institute
- Nikolay Karnaukhov — watchman Stepanych
- Ksenia Kozmina — Vivarium of the Institute of the Brain
- Zoya Vasilkova — fellow of the Institute of the Brain
- Zoya Isaeva — editorial employee
- Rano Hamrayeva — fellow of the Institute of the Brain
- Alexander Levshin — researcher of the Institute of the Brain
