= Do Not Part with Your Beloved =

- Directed by: Pavel Arsenov
- Written by: Alexander Volodin
- Starring: Aleksandr Abdulov; Irina Alfyorova
- Cinematography: Grigory Belenky
- Music by: Yevgeny Krylatov
- Production company: Gorky Film Studio
- Release date: 1980
- Running time: 76 min.
- Country: USSR
- Language: Russian

Do Not Part with Your Beloved or (Russian: С любимыми не расставайтесь, romanized: S lyubimymi ne rasstavaytes) is a Soviet romantic drama, directed by Pavel Arsenov in 1980. The film is based on the eponymous play written in 1971 by Alexander Volodin. The picture was remade in 2014 as Another Year by director Oksana Bychkova.

== Plot ==
Divorce proceedings is the last and the most difficult act in the life of any family. In a civil court there is a continuous bustle: for various reasons people who have recently loved each other and who have built their lives together, are forced to prove and explain to the judge that nothing binds them together anymore. Family life, with all its joys and sorrows, is put on public display and for discussion which is always agonizingly painful and embarrassing ...

Young spouses Mitya and Katya are participants in one of the tragic stories. Katya provokes a fierce jealousy from Mitya's side for sleeping over at her classmate Vadim's place. Mitya torments himself, his wife and Vadim, he endlessly asks the same question - did Katya cheat on him or not?

After a series of endless scandals, Katya and Mitya get divorced. But attempts to settle their lives individually lead to nothing. Despite the parting they continue to love each other ardently, although pride does not allow Katya or Mitya to take the first step forward. The finale of the story remains open: Katya is admitted to a psychiatric hospital for experiencing a nervous breakdown, during Mitya's visit she gets into a hysterical fit, and while sobbing she cries of her love in the arms of her ex-husband ...

== Cast ==
- Aleksandr Abdulov – Mitya Lavrov
- Irina Alfyorova – Katya Lavrova
- Lyudmila Drebneva – Irina, Mitya's girlfriend
- Rufina Nifontova – judge
- Boris Shcherbakov – Vadim, photographer, Katya's classmate
- Yevgeniy Yevstigneyev – Homak, Vadim's neighbor
- Georgi Margvelashvili – Dato Kirilashvili, divorcing husband
- Valentina Grushina – Larisa Kirilashvili, divorcing wife
- Klara Luchko – Larisa's mother
- Aleksandr Porokhovshchikov – Nikulin, divorcing husband
- Yekaterina Vasilyeva – Nikulina, divorcing wife with son
- Sergei Nikonenko – Shumilov, drunkard, divorcing husband
- Ekaterina Voronina – Shumilova, divorcing wife
- Yuriy Nazarov – Mironov, divorcing husband
- Larisa Luzhina – Mironova, divorcing wife
- Georgi Yepifantsev – Belov, divorcing husband
- Lyubov Polekhina – Belova, wife refusing to divorce her husband
