= Irina Muravyova =

Russian actress

- Ирина Муравьёва
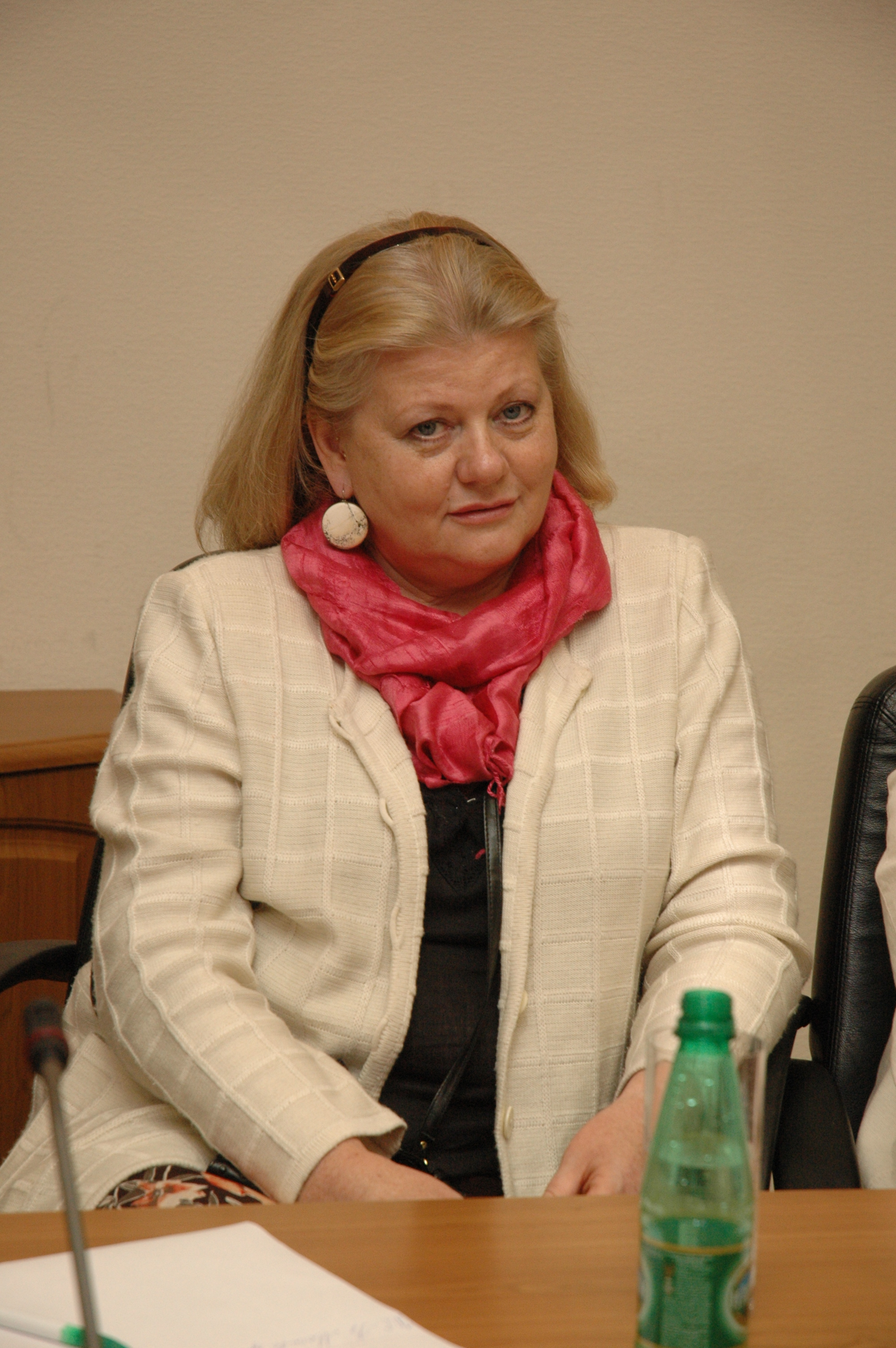
- Muravyova in 2008
- Born: 8 February 1949 (age 77); Moscow, Russian SFSR, Soviet Union
- Education: Russian Academy of Theatre Arts
- Alma mater: Central Children's Theatre; Mossovet Theatre; Maly Theatre
- Occupation: Actor
- Spouse: Leonid Ejdlin
- Awards: Commemorative medal "150th anniversary of A. P. Chekhov"; Nika (2011)

Irina Vadimovna Muravyova (Russian: Ирина Вадимовна Муравьёва; born 8 February 1949) is a Soviet and Russian film, television and stage actress, who is most known for her performances in Moscow Does Not Believe In Tears (1979), Karnaval (1981), The Most Charming and Attractive (1985) and her work with Maly Theatre of Moscow (since 1993). She was awarded with the USSR State Prize, Order of Merit for the Fatherland and Order of Honour.

== Biography ==
Muravyova was born on 8 February 1949 in Moscow, Russia. In 1982 she graduated from Russian Academy of Theatre Arts. Her first minor film role was in Children of Don Quixote. Her first major film appearance was in the 1974 film A Very English Murder. Her early works include Au-u! (1975) and Duenya (1976). Muravyova gained popularity after appearing in the 1980 film Moscow Does Not Believe In Tears.

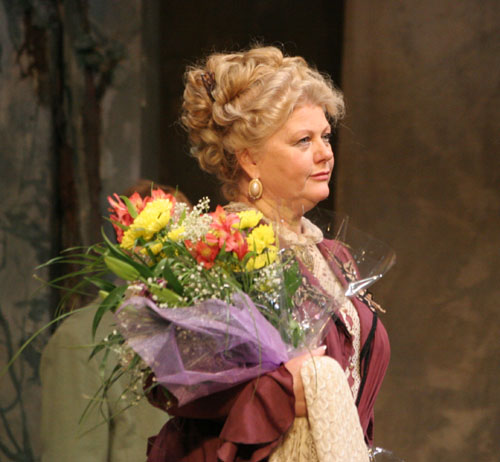
Muravyova as Arkadina in The Seagull in 2008

Her other screen appearances include Fox Hunting (1980), We, the Undersigned (1981), Hands Up! (1982), The Incredible Bet (1984), Calf Year (1986), Babnik (1990), When Late for ZAGS (1991), Big Trap, or Solo for a Cat Under a Full Moon (1992), This Woman in the Window (1993). In 1989, she became Annie Girardot's partner in Valery Akhadov's film Ruf. She voiced the Queen's Bichon, Milady and Bat in the Dog in Boots film.

Muravyova is married to film director Leonid Eidlin. They had two sons: Daniil (born 1975) and Yevgeniy (born 1983).

== Selected filmography ==
- A Very English Murder (1974) as Susan
- Moscow Does Not Believe in Tears (1979) as Lyudmila Sviridova
- Fox Hunting (1980) as Marina Belova
- Carnival (1981) as Nina Solomatina
- The Most Charming and Attractive (1985) as Nadya Klyueva
- Madam Bovary from Sliven (1991) as Vera
- Not Born Beautiful (2005) as Yelena Aleksandrovna Pushkaryova
- One Night of Love (2008) as Anna

== Honours and awards ==
- Order of Merit for the Fatherland, 4th class (2006) - for outstanding contribution to the development of theatrical art as well as decades of creative activity
- Order of Honour (1999) - for outstanding contribution to the development of domestic theatrical culture, and in connection with the 175th Anniversary of the State Academic Maly Theatre of Russia
- Order of Friendship (2010) - for merits in development of national culture and art as well as decades of successful activity
- Medal "In Commemoration of the 850th Anniversary of Moscow"
- Order of the Badge of Honour (1983)
- USSR State Prize (1981, for her role in Moscow Does Not Believe in Tears)
- Honoured Artist of the RSFSR (1983)
- People's Artist of Russia (1994)
- Chekhov's Medal (2005)
- State Prize of the Russian Federation for work in the field of culture (2006)
- Commemorative Medal of the Ministry of Culture, "the 150th anniversary of Anton Chekhov" (2011)
- Honorary Worker of Culture of the Kuznetsk Basin (2007)
- Awarded the prize for the best role of an adult in the movie Best Grandmother at the VIII Festival of domestic films "Moscow Premiere" (2010)
- National Film Award "Nika" "Best Actress" category, for the film The Chinese Grandmother (2010)
- Awarded the prize for "Best Supporting Actor" at the "Constellation" (Sozvezdie) film festival (2011)
