= Confusion of Feelings (film) =

- Russian: Смятение чувств
- Directed by: Pavel Arsenov
- Written by: Aleksandr Volodin
- Starring: Elena Proklova; Sergei Nagorny; Iya Savvina; Aleksandr Kalyagin; Nina Mager
- Cinematography: Mikhail Yakovich
- Edited by: Tatyana Malyavina
- Music by: Yevgeny Krylatov
- Release date: 1977
- Running time: 78 minute
- Country: Soviet Union
- Language: Russian

Confusion of Feelings (Russian: Смятение чувств, romanized: Smyatyeniye Chuvstv) is a 1977 Soviet teen drama film directed by Pavel Arsenov.

== Plot ==
After graduating from school, Nadia entered the Leningrad Medical Institute, where she fell in love with a married man, and decided to return home, but at home not as calmly as she thought.

== Cast ==
- Elena Proklova as Nadya
- Sergei Nagorny as Volodya
- Iya Savvina as Nina Dmitriyevna
- Aleksandr Kalyagin as Viktor Semyonovich
- Nina Mager
- Arina Aleynikova as Teacher
- Tatyana Drubich as Masha
- Andrey Yaroslavtsev as Koshelev
- Veronika Izotova
- Nikolai Konstantinov
