= Save the Drowning Man =

- Russian: Спасите утопающего
- Directed by: Pavel Arsenov
- Written by: Vadim Korostylyov; Isai Kuznetsov; Avenir Zak
- Starring: Andrei Ushakov; Leonid Karasyov; Egor Dyakov; Vladimir Bobylyov; Vladimir Varenov
- Cinematography: Grigori Garibyan
- Music by: Mikael Tariverdiev
- Release date: 1967
- Country: Soviet Union
- Language: Russian

Save the Drowning Man (Russian: Спасите утопающего, romanized: Spasite utopayushchego) is a 1967 Soviet children's adventure comedy film directed by Pavel Arsenov.

== Plot ==
The film tells about the pioneer Andrew and his friend. They imitate the accident in front of foreign tourists on the water. The young correspondent Egor noticed this, and as a result, the portraits of the pioneer hang wherever possible, he receives an invitation to the radio, people shot a movie about him. And now, when friends wanted to retreat, they began to realize that it would not be as easy as it seems...

== Cast ==
- Andrei Ushakov as Andrei Vasilkov
- Leonid Karasyov as Gulka (as Lyonya Karasyov)
- Egor Dyakov as Podushkin
- Vladimir Bobylyov
- Vladimir Varenov
- Anna Ratnikova
- Yuri Solodov
- Svetlana Kharitonova
- Valeriy Nosik
