= Irina Alfyorova =

Soviet and Russian actress (born 1951)

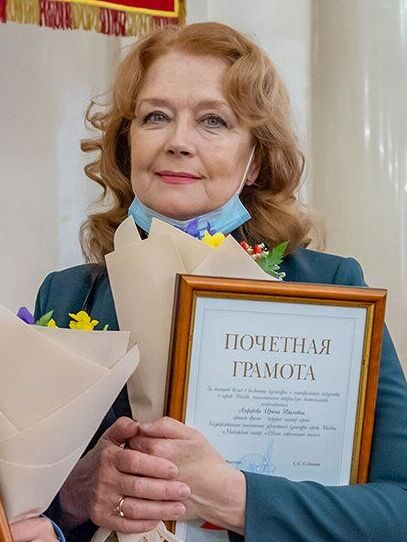
- Born: Irina Ivanovna Alfyorova; 13 March 1951 (age 75); Novosibirsk, RSFSR, USSR
- Citizenship: Soviet Union; Russia
- Occupation: Actress
- Years active: 1970–present

Irina Ivanovna Alfyorova PAR (Russian: Ири́на Ива́новна Алфёрова; born 13 March 1951) is a Soviet and Russian actress. She was formerly married to Russian film and stage actor Aleksandr Abdulov, he adopted her daughter, Ksenia (from marriage to a Bulgarian diplomat Boyko Gyurov).

== Biography ==
Alfyorova was born in Novosibirsk, Russian SFSR, Soviet Union (now Russia) to a family of lawyers.

After graduation, she moved to Moscow and entered the Russian Academy of Theatre Arts (GITIS).

In 1970, as a student, she made her cinematic debut in Alekseich. In 1972 she acted in two more films; The Silver Pipe and Teacher of Singing.

In 1972, Irina Alfyorova graduated from GITIS. In the same year, director Vasily Ordynsky invited her to the role of Dasha in the television mini-series Road to Calvary. In 1977, the series was released and was a great success.

In 1976, she entered the troupe of Lenkom Theatre.

In parallel with work in the theater, she continued to act in films: Black Birch (1977), Autumn Bells (1978).

In 1979, Irina Alfyorova starred in the film directed by Georgi Yungvald-Khilkevich D'Artagnan and Three Musketeers in the role of Constance Bonacieux, which brought her great fame. Her role was voiced by Anastasiya Vertinskaya. In the same year she co-starred with Aleksandr Abdulov in the melodrama Do Not Part with Your Beloved

From 1980 to 1983, Irina Alfyorova starred in several films: Courage (1981), For no apparent reason (1982), Presentiment of Love (1982). In 1984, the political detective TASS Is Authorized to Declare... appeared on the screens, in which Alfyorova played Olga Winter.

In the period from 1984 to 1991, Irina Alfyorova starred in more than ten films, including Seven Elements, Bagration, Love Letters with Intent.

In 1992, Irina Alfyorova was awarded the title of Merited Artist of the Russian Federation.

In 1993, she left Lenkom for the Theatre School of Modern Play.

In the theater "School of Modern Play" she played in the performances Everything will be Fine, as You Wanted, The Other Man, A Man Has Come to a Woman, With His Words.

In 2011, she was engaged in the plays Anton Chekhov. The Seagull, Boris Akunin. The Seagull, The Seagull. The Real Operetta, and Star Fever.

From 1996 to 2007, Alfyorova was mainly engaged in a theatrical career, she also starred in several films (Ermak, Alisa Fox, Sonya Gold Pen, Pechorin. Hero of Our Time and others).

In 2007, she was awarded the title of People's Artist of Russia.

In 2008, she became president of the international film festival "In the Family Circle" . The film festival is held within the framework of the nationwide program of the same name, whose goal is "to strengthen the state ideology aimed at reviving the family in Russia". The festival was founded on the initiative of the Church Public Forum "Spiritually Moral Basis of Russia's Demographic Development" (founders Patriarch of Moscow and All Russia and Presidential Envoy to the Central Federal District).

== Personal life ==
Irina Alfyorova was married to Aleksandr Abdulov, whom she divorced in 1993. After that, she married actor Sergei Martynov. In their family there are four children: Alexander (the son of Alfyorova's deceased sister), Ksenia (Alfyorova's daughter) and two children of Martynov from his first marriage (son Sergey and daughter Anastasia).

In 2007, Irina Alfyorova became a grandmother.

She was blacklisted in Ukraine for supporting the Annexation of Crimea by the Russian Federation in 2015.

== Selected filmography ==
Year	English title	Original title	Role
1971	Alekseich	Алексеич	Marya Alexandrovna, rural teacher
1972	A Teacher of Singing	Учитель Пения	Tamara, daughter of the Solomatins
1977	Black Birch	Чёрная Береза	Tanya
1977	Walking Through the Torments	Хождение по Мукам	Daria (Dasha) Dmitrievna Bulavina-Telegina
1978	Autumn Bells	Осенние Колокола	Queen
1978	d'Artagnan and Three Musketeers	д'Артаньян и Три Мушкетёра	Constance Bonacieux
1979	Exile No. 011	Ссыльный №011	Alisa Varlamtseva
1980	Uninvited Friend	Незваный Друг	Kira Strugina
1980	Do Not Part With Your Beloved	С Любимыми не Расставайтесь	Katya Lavrova
1981	Courage	Мужество	Clara, architect
1981	Fairy Lala	Фея Лала	Queen Iris
1982	For No Apparent Reason	Без Видимых Причин	Nina Petrovna Plyusnina, actress
1982	Vasily Buslaev	Василий Буслаев	Ksenia
1982	Premonition of Love	Предчувствие Любви	Elena
1982	Saturday and Sunday	Суббота и Воскресенье	The mother of a child who dreams of having a dog
1983	Kiss	Поцелуй	Sonya, a young lady in lilac
1984	The Right to Choose	Право на Выбор	Tanya
1984	Seven Elements	Семь Стихий	Valentina Anurova, biologist
1984	TASS Is Authorized to Declare...	ТАСС Уполномочен Заявить...	Olga Winter
1985	Love Letters with Intent	Любовные Письма с Умыслом	Melita
1985	Bagration	Багратион	Princess Elizabeth Skavronskaya
1985	Rough Landing	Грубая Посадка	Tasia
1985	Two Knew the Password	Пароль Знали Двое	Irina Kabardina
1985	Man With an Accordion	Человек с Аккордеоном	Lena (Lyola) Glan
1985	Beauty Salon	Салон Красоты	Lyalya, Vadim's wife
1985	Did You Call the Snow Maiden?	Снегурочку Вызывали?	Svetlana Aleksandrovna Nechaeva, actress (Snegurochka)
1987	Such a Story	Вот Такая История	Galya
1989	And Everything Will Repeat...	И Повторится Всё...	Anna
1991	Top Class	Высший Класс	Vera Pavlovna Smirnova
1991	Star of the Sheriff	Звезда Шерифа	Anna Blay
1991	Blood For Blood	Кровь за Кровь	Elena G. Vanina
1991	Night Fun	Ночные Забавы	Anna (Anya) Nikolaevna Silina, wife of Alexei, mother of Olga, mistress of Mikhail Ezepov
1993	Countess Dora	Графиня Дора	Sidonia Nadgerni
1996	Ermak	Ермак	Alena, concubine of Khan Kuchum
1997	Love Stories	Любовные Истории	Tamara
2000	Paradise Lost	Потерянный Рай	Olga Sapega, Artyom's wife
2001	Lisa Alisa	Лиса Алиса	Natalie, wife of the cultural attaché
2006	Hero of Our Time	Герой Нашего Времени	Princess Ligovskaya
2006	Sonya	Сонька	Mrs. Elena, dressmaker
2007	Trap	Капкан	Ekaterina Andreevna Volobueva, wife of Mikhail Grigorievich Volobuev
2007	Debt	Долг	Sofia Markovna
2010	Old People	Старики	Vera
2011	Yolki 2	Ёлки 2	Yulia Snegireva, beloved of Grigory Zemlyanikin and Boris Vorobyov
2011	Raspoutine	Распутин	Zinaida Yusupova
2013-2015	The Last of the Magikyans	Последний Магикян	Lyudmila Sergeevna, mother of Natasha, mother-in-law of Karen Magikyan
2016	Yolki 5	Ёлки 5	Yuliya Snegireva
2018	Last Test	Последнее Испытание	Natalya Ivanovna
2019	Happiness Is... Part 2	Счастье – это… Часть 2	
2020	Whirlpool	Водоворот	Beata Kocharovska
