= Prisoners of Yamagiri-Maru =

- Directed by: Aleksei Solovyov
- Written by: Kir Bulychov
- Starring: Tatyana Aksyuta: Tatiana Kuryanova; Vsevolod Larionov
- Cinematography: Evgeniy Turevich
- Edited by: L. Kopteva
- Music by: Alexander Zhurbin
- Production company: Studio Ekran
- Release date: 1988
- Running time: 25 minutes
- Country: Soviet Union
- Language: Russian

Prisoners of Yamagiri-Maru (Russian: Узники «Ямагири-мару», romanized: Uzniki «Yamagiri-maru») is a 1988 Soviet stop-motion animated science fiction short film directed by Aleksei Solovyov based on the short story of the same name by Kir Bulychov.

== Plot ==
The end of the 21st century. Alisa Seleznyova and Pashka Geraskin undergo school practice under the leadership of Aran Singh, the director of the ocean farm on the island of Yap where mysterious events have recently begun to occur: species of marine creatures unknown to science suddenly appear while dolphins and whales belonging to the farm are vanishing.

Pashka learns that the Japanese transport "Yamagiri-Maru" sunk near the island during World War II, carrying jewels from Burma, captured by the Japanese. He is going to stealthily take a submersible apparatus — a "bathyscaphe", to go down inside the ship and find treasures there, but Alice persuades him to swim with her.

In the sunken cruiser, Alice and Pashka find mutants (similar to ordinary octopuses) that went extinct during the last hundred years under because of oil spillage during the crash. The bathyscaphe brings down the tank that was in the transport, which crushes the manipulator, and thus Alisa and Pashka are captured. Mutants have signs of intellect and counteract their attempts to cut off the manipulator and free themselves. Aran Singh announces a rescue operation and flies to the scene where he kills the "king" of mutants and rescues Alice and Pashka.

== Cast ==
- Tatyana Aksyuta — Alisa Seleznyova
- Tatiana Kuryanova — Pasha Geraskin
- Vsevolod Larionov — Aran Singh
