= Alisa Seleznyova =

Fictional book, film and TV character created by Kir Bulychev

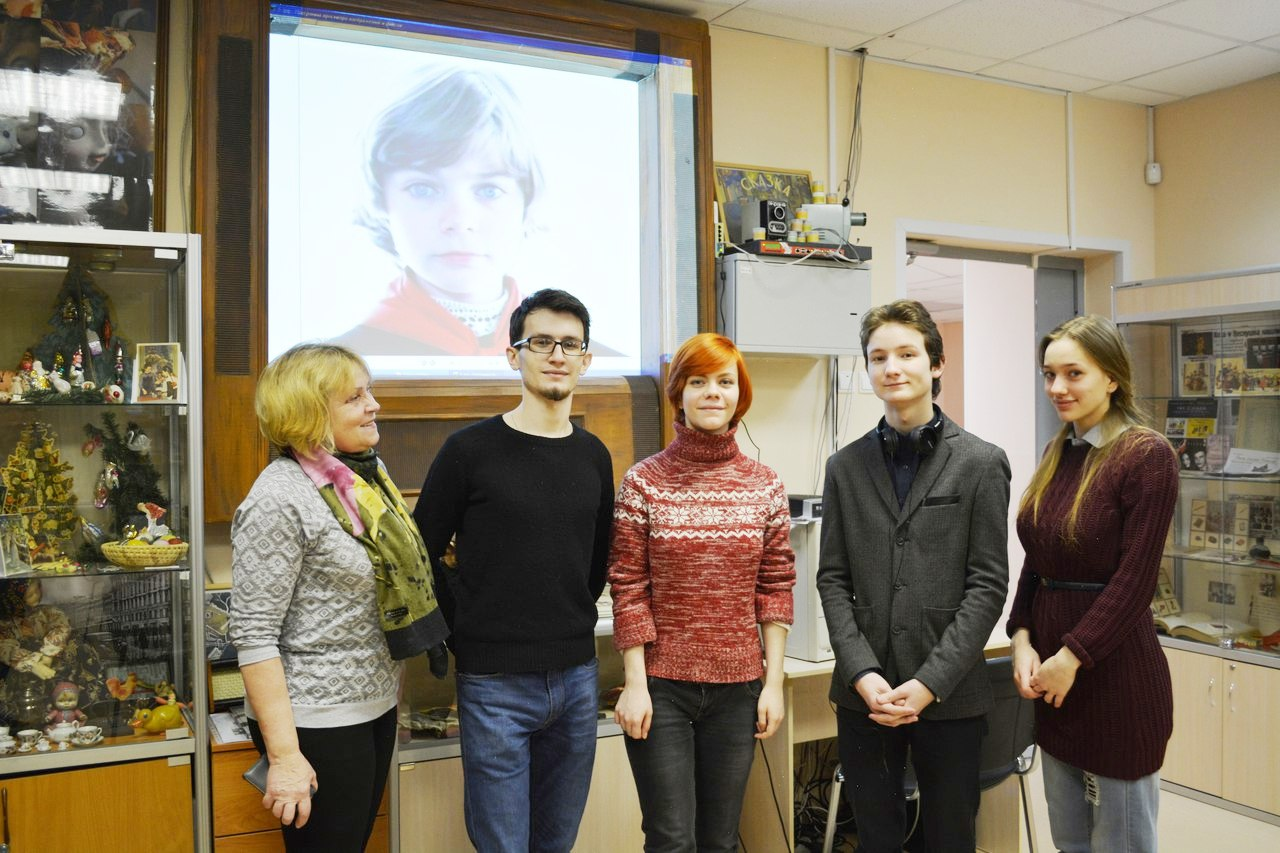
Fans posing in front of a still of Natalya Guseva as Alisa Selezneva

Alisa Seleznyova (Russian: Алиса Селезнёва) is the protagonist of an eponymous series of children's science fiction books by Russian writer Kir Bulychev. The first novel of the series was published in 1965, with further writings continuing until Bulychev's death in 2003. The series served as a base for a number of animated and live-action adaptations. Alisa Seleznyova was named as one of the most recognizable faces of Soviet cinema with a cult following ("Alisomania").

== Summary ==
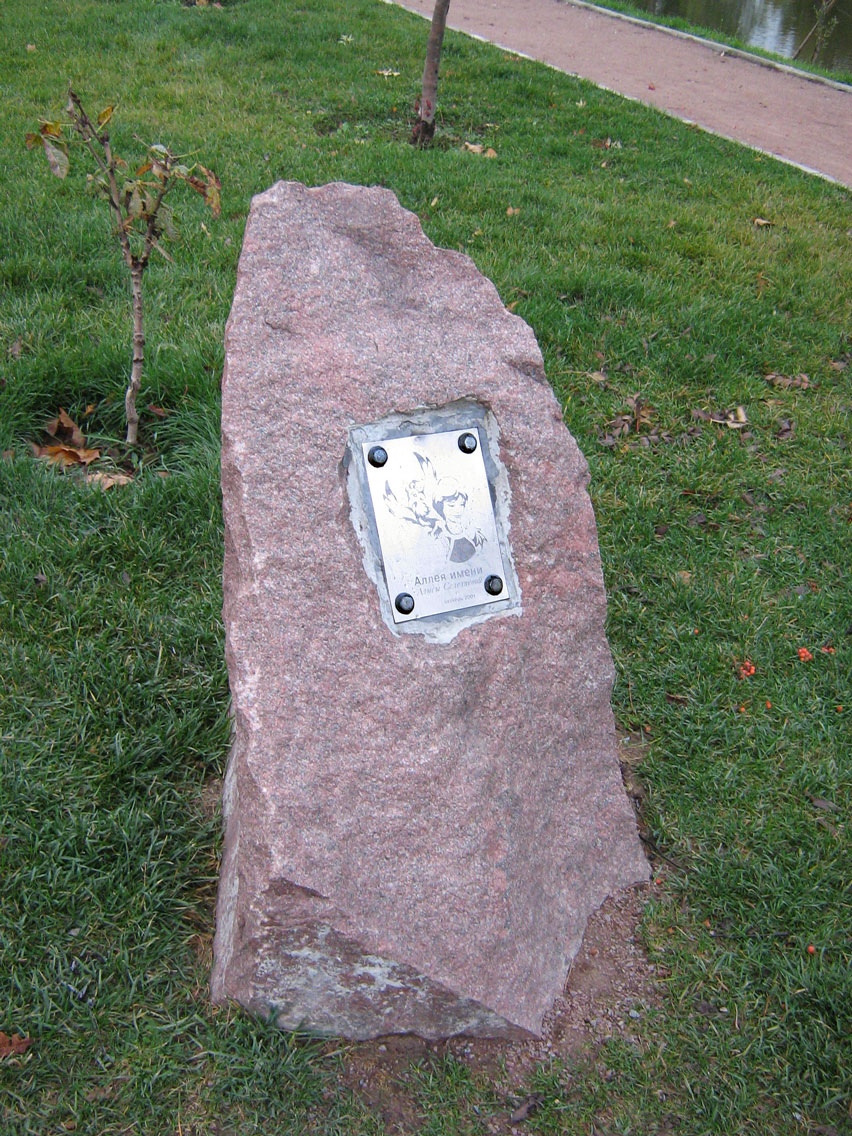
Memorial stone located at the Alisa Seleznyova Alley, Moscow

A Russian speculative fiction series, the Alisa stories are set in the late 21st century, at which point humanity has mastered faster than light space travel, and where robots and aliens are common. Time travel is possible, but reserved only for scientific purposes. The series is set in an idealised futuristic society, mostly portrayed as an idealised communist utopia, with no need for money, a focus on benefitting humankind, and strict protections placed upon the environment; some of the later books, however, contradict this model at least regarding money.

The protagonist, Alisa, is a curious Russian teenager with an interest in solving mysteries, whether scientific or detective. The stories feature a mixture of adventure and science fiction, with characters exploring distant planets, travelling through space and time, and meeting and engaging with aliens, space pirates and other extra-terrestrial beings. Whilst Alisa is the main character, she is often accompanied on her adventures by her friends, and occasionally her father, Professor Seleznev, who is an astrobiologist and the director of the fictional Moscow CosmoZoo.

Alisa's family are named for Bulychev's own, with the heroine named for his own daughter Alisa, and her parents being named after himself and his wife, Kira, who provided early illustrations for the series. Bulychev noted however, that although Alisa shared the name of his daughter, her age and temperament were changed for the fictional character, with Bulychev stating:

"Why have you decided that my Alisa Seleznyova is connected with my daughter Alisa? They are not even similar. [My] Alisa hasn't even read all books 'about herself', she prefers a higher class of literature."

Despite Bulychev's wife Kira illustrating earlier books in the Alisa series, it is Russian animator and illustrator Yevgeniy Migunov's art that is most commonly associated with the stories.

== Selected bibliography ==
Only full-length novels are listed.

- ru:Девочка, с которой ничего не случится (A Girl Nothing Will Happen To, 1965)
- Ржавый фельдмаршал (Rusty Field Marshal, 1968)
- ru:Путешествие Алисы (Alisa's Travel, 1974)
- ru:День рождения Алисы (Alisa's Birthday, 1974); animation: Alisa's Birthday
- ru:Миллион приключений (Million of Adventures, 1976)
- ru:Сто лет тому вперёд (One Hundred Years Ahead, 1978); film: One Hundred Years Ahead
- Пленники астероида (Prisoners of Asteroid, 1981)
- ru:Лиловый шар (The Lilac Ball, 1983); film: Lilac Ball
- ru:Заповедник сказок (The Reserve of Fairy Tales, 1985)
- ru:Козлик Иван Иванович (Ivan Ivanovich the Goat, 1985)
- Узники «Ямагири-мару», 1985; animation: Prisoners of Yamagiri-Maru (1988)
- Гай-до (Guy-do, 1986)
- Конец Атлантиды (The End of Atlantis, 1987)
- ru:Город без памяти (The City Without Memory, 1988)
- Подземная лодка (The Underground Boat, 1989)
- Война с лилипутами (The War Against Midgets, 1992)
- Алиса и крестоносцы (Alisa and the Crusaders, 1993)
- Излучатель доброты (The Kindness Ray, 1994)
- Дети динозавров (Dino Kids, 1995)
- Сыщик Алиса (Alisa the Detective, 1996)
- Привидений не бывает (Ghosts Don't Exist, 1996)
- Опасные сказки (Dangerous Tales, 1997)
- Планета для тиранов (A Planet for Tyrants, 1997)
- Секрет чёрного камня (Secret of the Black Stone, 1999)
- Алиса и чудовище (Alisa and a Monster, 1999)
- Звёздный пёс (The Star Dog, 2001)
- Вампир Полумракс (Twilights the Vampire, 2001)
- Алиса и Алисия (Alisa and Alicia, 2003)

The complete list in Russian Wikipedia: Список книг об Алисе Селезнёвой.

== TV and film adaptations ==
- The Mystery of the Third Planet (animated film, 1981)
- Guest from the Future (live action TV series, 1985)
- Prisoners of Yamagiri-Maru (stop-motion animated short, 1988)
- Lilac Ball (live action film, 1988)
- Island of Rusty General (live action film, 1988)
- Alisa's Birthday (animated film, 2009)
- Alisa Knows What to Do! (animated TV series, 2013)
- Guest from the Future a.k.a. One Hundred Years Ahead (live action film, 2024)
