= Zhanna Rozhdestvenskaya =

Soviet-Russian singer (born 1950)

- Born: Zhanna Germanovna Rozhdestvenskaya; 23 November 1950 (age 75)
- Origin: Rtishchevo, Saratov Oblast, RSFSR, USSR
- Genres: Classical, Film music, Russian music, Soviet estrada
- Occupation: singer
- Instruments: piano, electric organ, vocal
- Years active: 1970–present

Zhanna Germanovna Rozhdestvenskaya (Russian: Жа́нна Ге́рмановна Рожде́ственская; born 23 November 1950 in Rtishchevo, Saratov Oblast, RSFSR, USSR) is a Soviet and Russian pop singer. Rozhdestvenskaya is widely known as a performer of songs in Soviet movies in the 1970s and 1980s, and was awarded the Honored Artist of the Russian Federation in 2011. She has a range of four octaves.

== Early life ==
Rozhdestvenskaya was born on 23 November 1950 in the town of Rtishchevo, in the Saratov Oblast of the Soviet Union. Rozhdestvenskaya often sang during her childhood, and graduated from a local music school in Rtishchevo, where she was considered one of the best students. From there, she went on to music school in the city of Saratov, which she graduated from in 1970.

== Career ==
From 1971 to 1973, she partook in the Saratov Philharmonic, where she performed as a soloist, and played the piano and electric organ. During this time, she was invited to perform in a pop musical, and would subsequently perform with the theater's troupe. After performing with the theater, Rozhdestvenskaya received an invitation to perform in Moscow. In 1976, she won a song contest in Sochi performing an aria in Alexey Rybnikov's rock opera The Star and Death of Joaquin Murieta. Rozhdestvenskaya performed in Rybnikov's rock operas through the rest of the 1970s.

In the early 1980s, Rozhdestvenskaya began performing with Rosconcert. From 1980 through 1983, she was ranked among the top five singers in the ZD Awards, the Soviet Union's predominant hit parade. Rozhdestvenskaya remained a highly popular singer within the Soviet Union through the mid 1980s, although she was often denied spots in major government-sponsored concerts, and instead consigned to roles within musical theater and as a voiceover artist. As a result, despite the widespread prominence of Rozhdestvenskaya's voice in popular television and movies, her public prominence began to fade away, while more public-facing singers like Alla Pugacheva gained popularity.

In the years following the collapse of the Soviet Union, Rozhdestvenskaya experienced economic misfortune and occasional unemployment. Ultimately, during the late 1990s, Alexey Rybnikov helped secure her a job as a vocal instructor at a theater in Moscow, which she continues to teach at, as of the late 2010s. During the 2000s, Rozhdestvenskaya began performing in rock operas again. She was awarded the Honored Artist of the Russian Federation in 2011.

== Partial discography ==
- 1979 — Ya i mama (LP, «Melodiya») - duet with daughter, Olya Rozhdestvenskaya
- 1981 — Tak budet v mire vsegda (7", «Melodiya»)
- 1983 — Pesni iz k/f "Karnaval" (7", «Melodiya»)
- 2005 — Izbrannoe (CD)
