= The Most Charming and Attractive =

- Directed by: Gerald Bezhanov
- Written by: Anatoly Eiramdzhan
- Starring: Irina Muravyova; Tatyana Vasileva; Aleksandr Abdulov; Leonid Kuravlyov
- Cinematography: Valentin Piganov
- Music by: Vladimir Rubashevski
- Production company: Mosfilm
- Release date: November 10, 1985
- Running time: 89 minutes
- Country: Soviet Union
- Language: Russian

The Most Charming and Attractive (Russian: Самая обаятельная и привлекательная, romanized: Samaya obayatelnaya i privlekatelnaya) is a 1985 Soviet romantic comedy film directed by Gerald Bezhanov.

== Plot ==
Nadya Klyueva, a kind and diligent employee at a research institute, is over thirty and still unmarried, unable to arrange her personal life despite her professional success. Her life begins to change when she unexpectedly meets her former schoolmate, Susanna, while riding a bus. Now an elegant professional sociologist, Susanna decides to help Nadya by giving her practical advice on how to change her behavior and clothing to successfully attract a husband.

According to Susanna's methods, Nadya’s target for romance is her stylish but frivolous colleague, Volodya Smirnov, known as a "Don Juan" and the office ladies’ man. Nadya is initially skeptical, but Susanna convinces her that success is possible if she stays committed. Under Susanna’s guidance, Nadya completes psychological questionnaires for herself and Volodya, which Susanna analyzes with the help of a computer. Susanna also arranges for Nadya to buy trendy clothing and instructs her on how to behave, leading Nadya to follow each suggestion diligently, though it often results in awkward and amusing situations.

Despite her efforts, however, Volodya shows little interest, even as other colleagues, such as Lesha Pryakhin and Misha Dyatlov, begin to notice her. Nadya dismisses both, as she sees Lesha as too simple and Misha as unavailable due to his family. In the meantime, she abandons her regular ping-pong games, leaving her friend Gena Sysoev, a technician at the institute, missing her company.

Susanna suggests a final surefire strategy—inviting Volodya to a Gianni Morandi concert. This backfires when Volodya shows up with another woman, trying to get tickets for her instead. Disillusioned, Nadya gradually realizes that the "scientific" approach to finding love is superficial and ineffective. Her doubts are confirmed when she learns that Susanna herself cannot keep her own husband from cheating.

In the end, Nadya returns to her ping-pong games with Gena and realizes that he, not Volodya, is her true match. Through her journey, Nadya learns that genuine connection cannot be forced and that her pursuit of love through artificial means was an illusion.

== Cast ==
- Irina Muravyova as Nadya Klyueva, SRI employee
- Tatyana Vasileva as Susanna, Nadya's experienced friend
- Aleksandr Abdulov as Volodya Smirnov, Nadya's colleague, SRI employee
- Leonid Kuravlyov as Pasha Diatlov, Nadya's colleague, SRI employee
- Mikhail Kokshenov as Lyoha Priakhin, Nadya's colleague, SRI employee
- Lyudmila Ivanova as Claudia Matveevna Stepankova, Nadya's colleague, SRI employee
- Larisa Udovichenko as Lyucya Vinogradova, Nadya's colleague, SRI employee
- Lev Perfilov as Pyotr Vasilievich, Nadya's chief
- Vladimir Nosik as Gena Sysoev, Nadya's friend and colleague, engineer
- Alexander Schirvindt as Arkady, Susanna's husband
- Lyubov Sokolova as Nadya's mother
- Vera Sotnikova as Sveta, Volodya Smirnov's girlfriend
- Viktor Filippov as policeman
- Igor Yasulovich as huckster
- Veronica Izotova as fellow traveler on train
- Viktor Ilichyov as Dima, fellow traveler's husband
