= Aleksei Fomkin =

Soviet child actor

- Алексей Фомкин
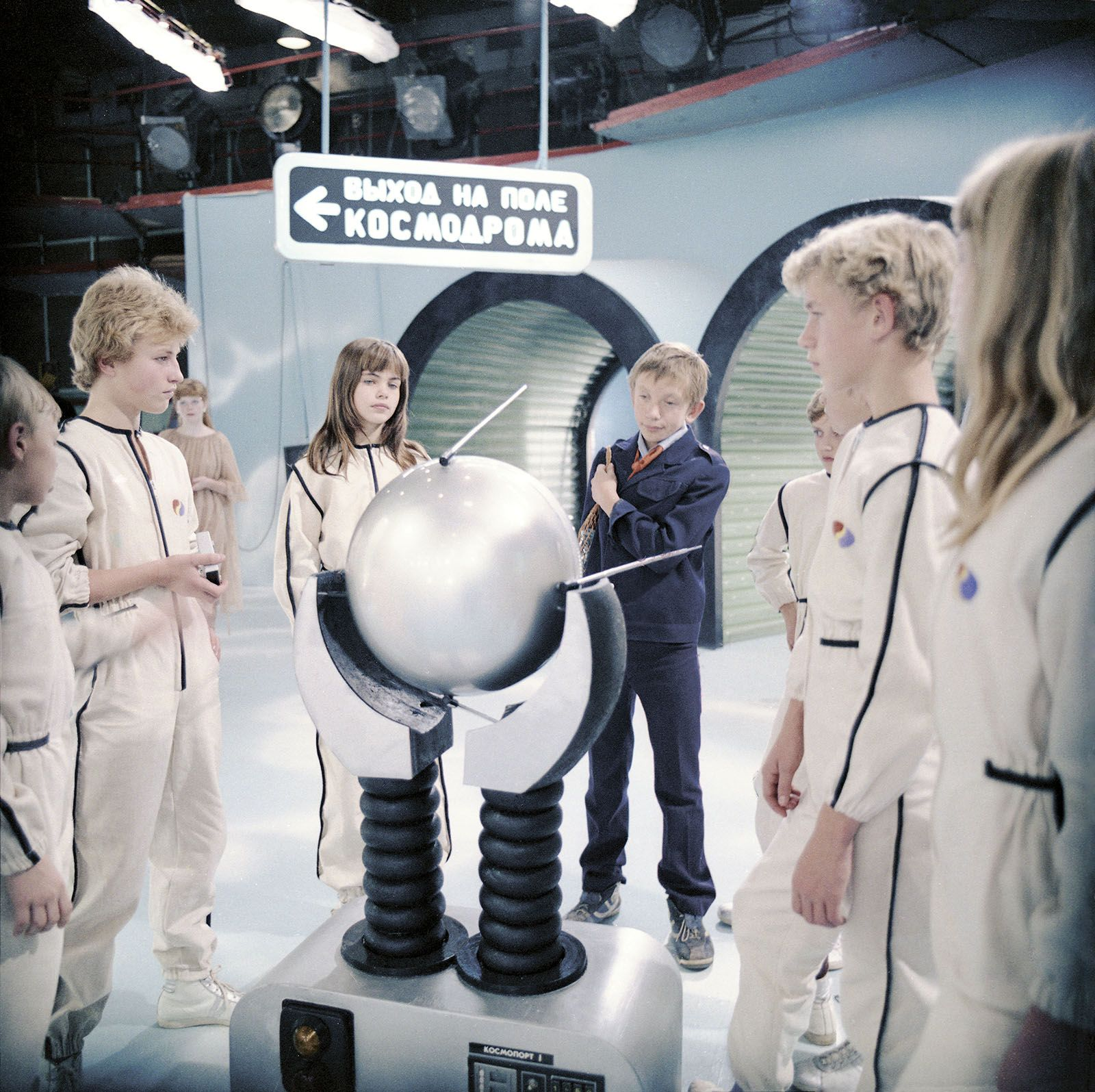
- Fomkin in Guest from the Future (1985)
- Born: 30 August 1969
- Died: 24 February 1996 (aged 26-27)
- Burial place: Vladimir, Russia

Aleksei Leonidovich Fomkin (Russian: Алексей Леонидович Фомкин, 30 August 1969 – 24 February 1996) was a Soviet Russian actor best known for his recurring appearances in the children's television series Yeralash and for his lead role in Guest from the Future.

== Filmography ==
- Guest from the Future (1985)
- Povod (occasion) (1986)
- Na Svoei Zemle (on the own land) (1987)

== Later life ==
In 1987 Fomkin went to serve in military, after not receiving any invitations for half a year. After returning from service in the army, Fomkin was briefly a part of the Moscow Art Theatre, but was fired. After that he worked as painter in construction, but also was fired. He left Moscow for Vladimir, Russia, where he worked as a miller and met his wife, Elena.

On 24 February 1996, Fomkin was staying over at an apartment with some friends, celebrating Defender of the Fatherland Day and drinking alcohol. When the apartment building caught on fire, he was asleep and thus, was the only one who did not make it out safely, eventually suffocating in the smoke. He was buried in Vladimir.
