= Man with an Accordion =

- Russian: Человек с аккордеоном
- Directed by: Nikolay Dostal
- Written by: Aleksandr Borodyanskiy
- Starring: Valeri Zolotukhin; Irina Alfyorova; Arina Aleynikova; Vladimir Soshalsky; Mikhail Pugovkin
- Cinematography: Yuriy Nevsky
- Music by: Aleksandr Goldshteyn
- Production company: Mosfilm
- Release date: 1985
- Running time: 93 min.
- Country: Soviet Union
- Language: Russian

Man with an Accordion (Russian: Человек с аккордеоном, romanized: Chelovek s akkordeonom) is a 1985 Soviet drama film directed by Nikolay Dostal.

== Plot ==
Dmitry Gromtsev broke up with his girlfriend as a result of the war. He was wounded and because of this refused to perform in operetta. But the love of domestic music and the desire to do good turned out to be stronger than circumstances.

== Cast ==
- Valeri Zolotukhin as Dmitry Gromtsev
- Irina Alfyorova as Lena
- Arina Aleynikova as Dmitry's mother
- Vladimir Soshalsky as Savely Mikhailovich
- Mikhail Pugovkin as uncle Kolya
- Sergei Milovanov as Savka
- Elena Pletneva as Tamara Novgorodskaya
- Stanislav Sadalskiy as Kostya Elkin
- Lyubov Malinovskaya as Fenya
- Yevgeny Yevstigneev as Lopatin
- Sergei Kolesnikov as Lopatin 's son
- Anton Golubev as Kolya Prikhodko
- Lyudmila Ivanova as Kolya Prikhodko's mother
