= Babnik =

The surname Babnik belongs to about 700 persons in Slovenia.

The surname may refer to:

- Gabriela Babnik (born 1979), Slovene writer, literary critic and translator
- Mary Babnik Brown (1907–1991), American known for having donated her hair to the military during World War II
