= Vladimir Nosik =

- Владимир Носик
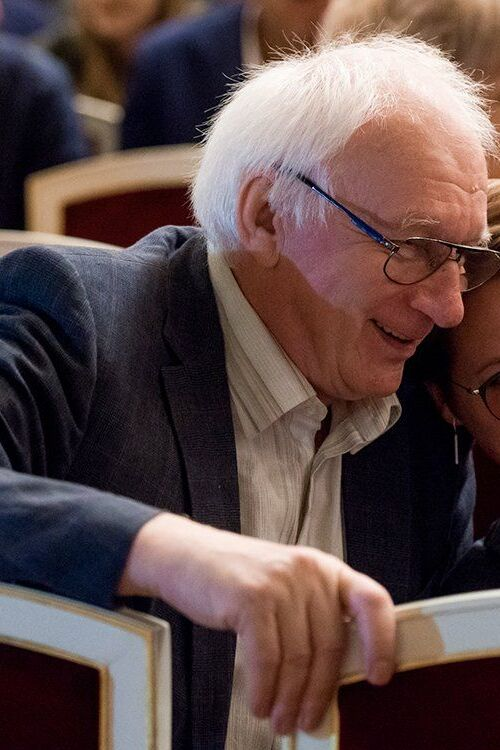
- Nosik in 2019
- Born: Vladimir Benediktovich Nosik; April 3, 1948 (age 78); Moscow, USSR
- Occupation: actor
- Years active: 1966–present
- Spouse: Elena Zincheva

Vladimir Benediktovich Nosik (Russian: Влади́мир Бенеди́ктович Но́сик; born 3 April 1948) is a Soviet and Russian actor, Honored Artist of Russia (1993), People's Artist of Russia (2016).

His older brother is People's Artist of Russia Valery Nosik. His daughter is actress Ekaterina Nosik.

== Selected filmography ==
- I'm Going to Search (Russian: Иду искать, 1966) as tourist
- Crime and Punishment (Преступление и наказание, 1970) as tavern servant
- You and Me (Ты и я, 1971) as Kolka
- This Merry Planet (Эта весёлая планета, 1973) as Valerik
- Earthly Love (Любовь земная, 1975) as Yurka
- When September Comes (Когда наступает сентябрь, 1976) as locksmith Gena
- Say a Word for the Poor Hussar (О бедном гусаре замолвите слово, 1981) as cornet Simpomponchik
- Guest from the Future (Гостья из будущего, 1985) as old man Pavel
- Dangerous for Your Life! (Опасно для жизни!, 1985) as Maxim Dmitriev
- The Most Charming and Attractive (Самая обаятельная и привлекательная, 1985) as Gena Sysoev
- How to Become Happy (Как стать счастливым, 1986) as fellow of the Brain Institute
- Lilac Ball (Лиловый шар, 1987) as Uuu-Uuu-Uuh the magician
- All Costs Paid (За всё заплачено, 1988) as Dusya
- Two Arrows. Stone Age Detective (Две стрелы. Детектив каменного века, 1989) as Long-haired
- Entrance to the Labyrinth (Вход в лабиринт, 1989) as Spirkin
- The Dark Side of the Moon (TV series) (Обратная сторона Луны, 2015) as Samosvalov
