= Natalya Guseva =

Soviet child actress (born 1972)

Nataliya Guseva
- Наталья Гусева
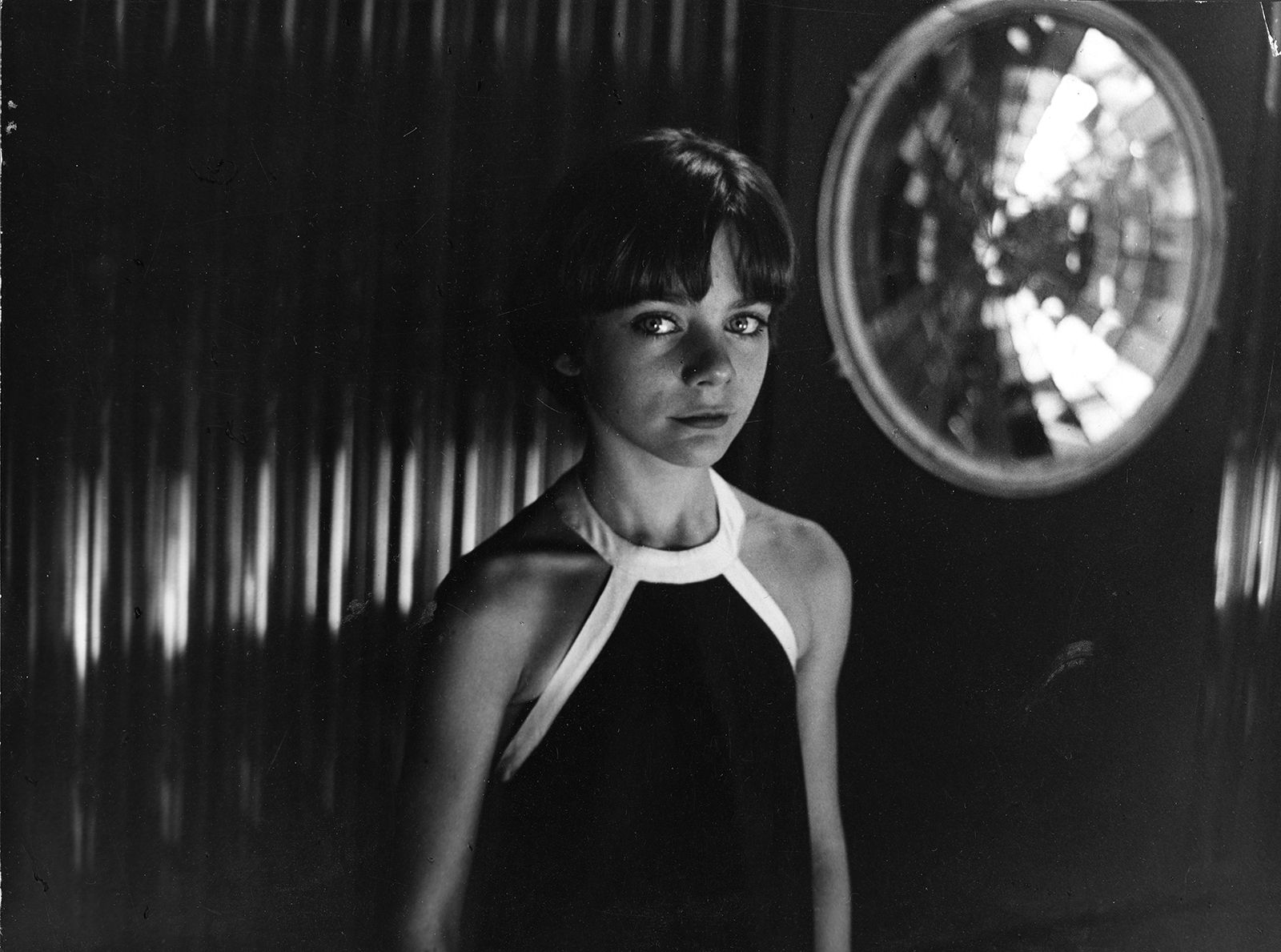
- Guseva in 1984
- Born: Nataliya Evgenyevna Guseva; 15 February 1972 (age 54); Zvenigorod, Moscow Oblast, Russian SFSR, Soviet Union
- Occupations: Actress, Biochemist.
- Years active: 1983–1988; 2008–present
- Website: mielofon.ru

Nataliya Evgenyevna Murashkevich (best known under her birth name, Natalya Guseva) (Russian: Ната́лия Евге́ньевна Гу́сева; born 15 February 1972) is a Soviet and Russian actress, who became well known in the Soviet Union for the leading role of Alisa Seleznyova in Guest from the Future (1984).

She graduated from Moscow State Academy of Fine Chemical Technology in 1995. In 2008, after a 20-year break from the spotlight, she participated in several film and television projects.

== Biography ==
Nataliya Yevgenyevna Guseva was born on February 15, 1972, in Zvenigorod. Her father was Evgeni Alexandrovich Gusev, a worker, and her mother was Galina Maksevna Guseva, a physician-therapist. In 1979 Natalya went to the first class of the Moscow Secondary School No. 692.

In 1983, an assistant from the Gorky Film Studio came to her school, who was looking for children with good diction. Natalya was one of the children selected and received an invitation to a tryout. As a result, her first role was as a schoolgirl in the children's short film Dangerous Trifles (1983), which was made in order to teach children traffic regulations. In this role, she caught the eye of an assistant to Pavel Arsenov, who was looking for a girl to play the role of Alisa Selezneva in the television series Guest from the Future. When meeting Arsenov, Natalya was so excited that when she was asked for her year of birth she mistakenly said 1872 instead of 1972.

Her role in the series made Nataliya extremely popular, and many Soviet schoolboys fell in love with her, leading to large quantities of fan mail (including from outside the Soviet Union). This phenomenon was known as "Alicemania" (Алисомания). Natalya was not ready for such fame, and for a while developed a problem with her posture: she walked with her head bowed low so that her fans would not recognize her. She starred in three other films during her career: The Race of the Century (1986), Lilac Ball (1987) and Will of the Universe (1988), but these films did not achieve the success of Guest from the Future. In The Race of the Century her role was relatively minor and episodic, and the film was a box-office failure. Lilac Ball was a sequel to Guest from the Future, but took a darker tone: Natalya again played Alisa Selezneva, but she was 14 years old during filming, and the character had moved on from that in Guest. After this, Natalya's film career came to a close. In 1989 she was offered the main role of Valery Nikolayev in the crime drama Crash – Cop's Daughter, but declined the offer as the plot contained many scenes of violence and she did not want to tarnish the image she had created of Alisa Selezneva. She later received several further offers of film roles, but refused them all, as the films contained, as she put it, "New Russian" scenes.

Natalya never intended to become a professional actress, having been fond of biology since childhood and often took many pictures of nature as a child. After graduating from school in 1989, she entered the Moscow State University of Fine Chemical Technologies in the biotechnology department, and graduated in 1994. After graduating she worked for a long time as a scientific researcher at a research institute. Natalya became one of the leaders in a company developing enzyme-linked immunosorbent assay test systems for the diagnosis of a number of infectious diseases. As of May 2017, she was no longer working, fully devoting herself to her younger daughter and family.

In 2007 NTV aired an episode on The Main Hero titled "Natasha Guseva: Alice as an Adult". It reports on the lives of Natalya and other young actors from Guest from the Future, and considers the significance of the series for the generation of the 1980s, and the cultural phenomenon of "Alicemania" (Алисомания).

In 2009 Nataliya returned to the film world for a short while, and voiced a role in the animated film Alice's Birthday.

=== Personal life ===
In the autumn of 1987, while in Minsk, she met her future husband, Denis Anatolievich Murashkevich (who had fallen in love with her when seeing her in Guest from the Future). In 1993 they married, and on December 14, 1996, they had a daughter whom they named Alesya. They divorced in 2001, but Natalya retained her husband's surname.

A few years after the divorce, Natalya met Sergei Lvovich Ambinder, a designer and employee of the charity fund "Rusfond", which is headed by his father. They moved in together, and in February 2013 Natalya gave birth to a daughter, Sofya. On July 18 of the same year Natalya and Sergei married.

== Filmography ==
Year	Title	Role	Notes
1983	Dangerous Trifles		Short
1984	Guest from the Future	Alisa Seleznyova	5 episodes
1986	The Race of the Century	Rachel Crowhurst	
1987	Lilac Ball	Alisa Seleznyova	
1988	Will of the Universe	Lena Lukashevich	
2009	Alice's Birthday	Starship Captain	Voice, postscoring

== Scientific publications ==
- Isachenkov VA, Ship O.P., Kulish M.A., Murashkevich N.E. Use of Color Photographic Reagents in Assays Based on Detection of Peroxidase Reactions // Biotechnology. - 1995. - No. 5-6 . - P. 36-40 .
