= Igor Yasulovich =

Russian actor (1941–2023)

- Игорь Ясулович
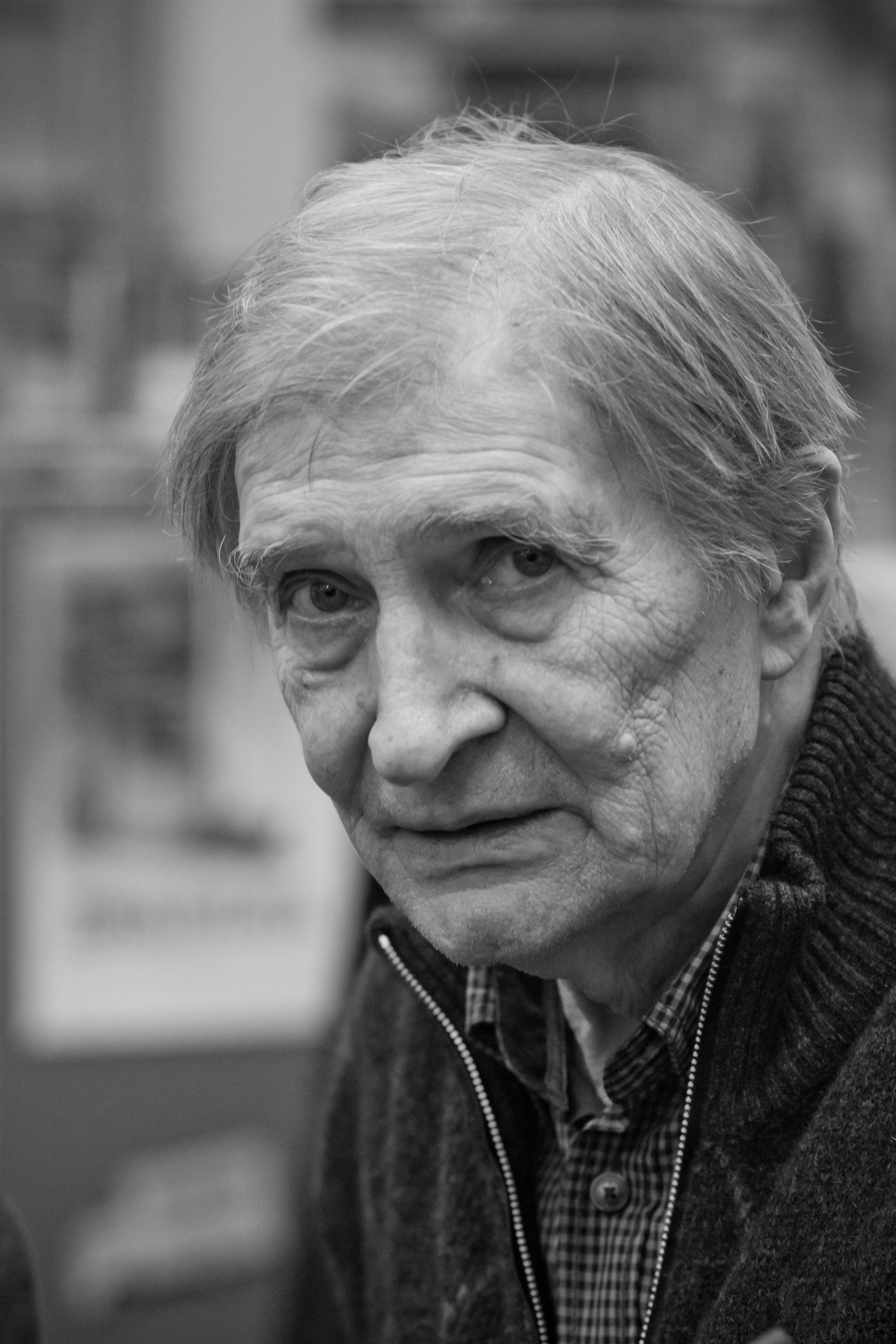
- Yasulovich in 2019
- Born: Igor Nikolayevich Yasulovich; 24 September 1941; Reynsfeld village, Koshkinsky District, Samara Oblast, Russian SFSR, USSR
- Died: 19 August 2023 (aged 81)
- Years active: 1961–2023
- Spouse: Natalia Egorova (married since 1963)
- Children: Alexey Yasulovich

Igor Nikolayevich Yasulovich (Russian: Игорь Николаевич Ясулович; 24 September 1941 – 19 August 2023) was a Soviet and Russian film and theater actor, film director and pedagogue.

== Biography ==
Yasulovich was born in the village of Reinsfeld (now Zalesye) in Koshkinsky District of Kuybyshev Oblast. In 1962 he graduated from the cast, and then, in 1974, Directing Department of the Gerasimov Institute of Cinematography.

From 1962, he became an actor of experimental theater-studio pantomime, in 1964–1994 — Theatre studio of film actor, 1994 — Moscow Youth Theater.

Yasulovich played over 170 roles in cinema, his debut appearance being in En Route (1961), albeit uncredited.

Igor Yasulovich died from kidney disease on 19 August 2023, at the age of 81.

== Honours and awards ==
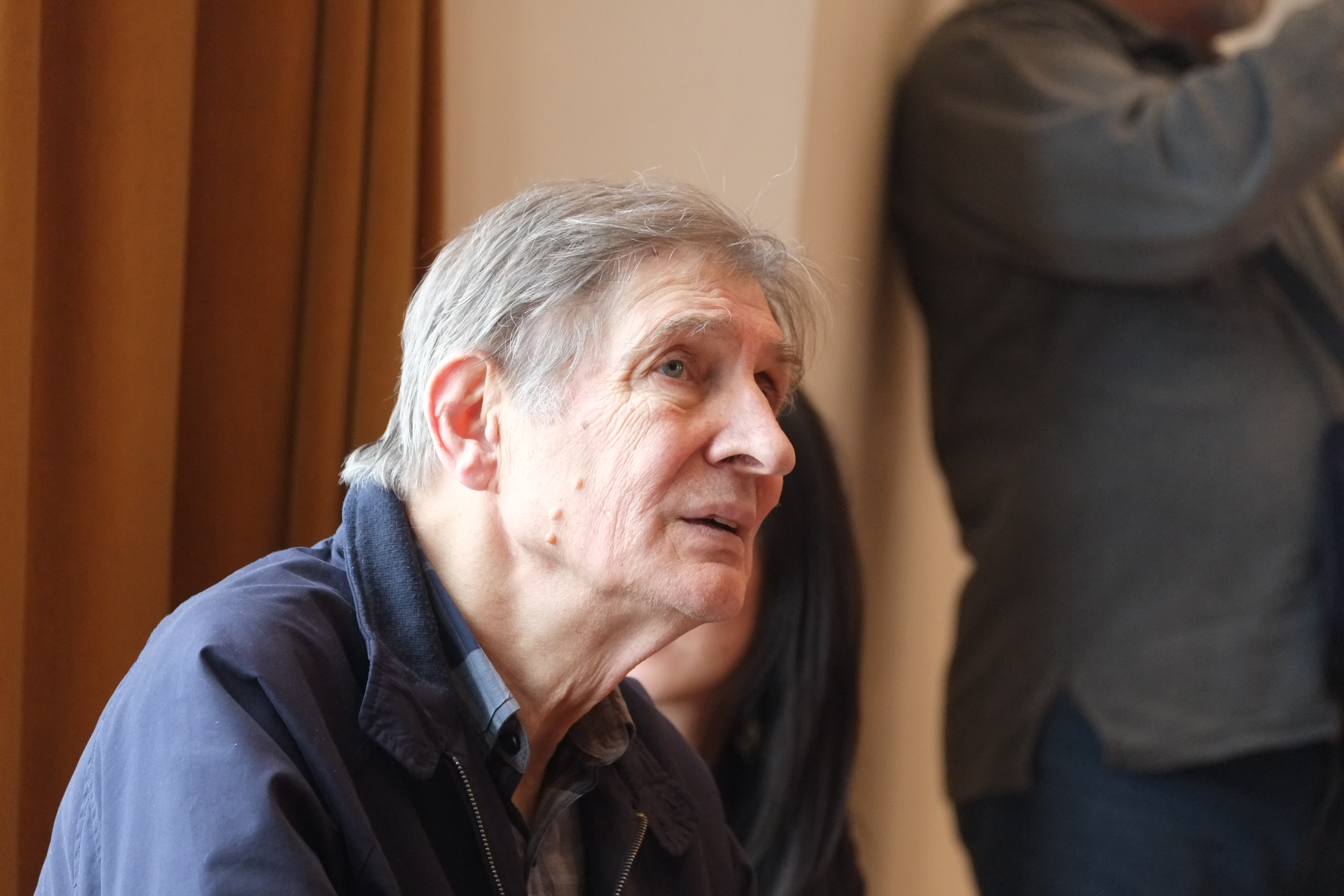
At the intellectuals congress against restoration of totalitarianism in 2014

- Honoured Artist of the RSFSR (1988)
- State Prize of the Russian Federation (2000)
- People's Artist of Russia (2001)
- Order of Honour (2013)

== Filmography ==
=== Actor ===
- En Route (Russian: В пути, 1961) as student-fellow traveler with baguettes (uncredited)
- Adventures of Krosh (Приключения Кроша, 1961) as dancer with glasses
- Nine Days in One Year (Девять дней одного года, 1961) as Fedorov, physicist
- Time, Forward! (Время, вперёд!, 1965) as Vinkich
- Aybolit-66 (Айболит-66, 1966) as episode
- Major Whirlwind (Майор Вихрь, 1967) as Kurt Appel
- The Golden Calf (Золотой телёнок, 1968) as young chauffeur
- The Diamond Arm (Бриллиантовая рука, 1968) as dog owner
- The Shield and the Sword (Щит и меч, 1968) as Goga
- Waterloo (Ватерлоо, 1970) as episode
- The Twelve Chairs (Двенадцать стульев, 1971) as Ernest Shchukin, engineer
- Princ Bajaja (1971) as Black Prince
- Ilf and Petrov Rode a Tram (Ехали в трамвае Ильф и Петров, 1972) as Vasya the sculptor / Hans the sculptor
- It Can't Be! (Не может быть!, 1975) as Lyolik, the painting customer / guest at the wedding
- 31 June (31 июня, 1978) as Master Jarvie / Dr. Jarvis
- The Very Same Munchhausen (Тот самый Мюнхгаузен, 1979) as Duke's Secretary
- Life Is Beautiful (Жизнь прекрасна, 1979) as prisoner
- Per Aspera Ad Astra (Через тернии к звездам, 1980) as Torki
- Mary Poppins, Goodbye (Мэри Поппинс, до свидания!, 1983) as Mr. Smith, the Park Keeper
- Guest from the Future (Гостья из будущего, 1985) as Electron Ivanovich, KosmoZoo employee
- The Most Charming and Attractive (Самая обаятельная и привлекательная, 1985) as huckster
- How to Become Happy (Как стать счастливым, 1986) as speaker at the opening of the monument
- Lilac Ball (Лиловый шар, 1987) as Koschei
- Mio in the Land of Faraway (Мио, мой Мио, 1987) as Eno / Carpetbeater
- Gardes-Marines, Ahead! (Гардемарины, вперёд!, 1988) as Korn
- The Witches Cave (Подземелье ведьм, 1990) as Conrad Zhmuda, ethnographer
- Black Square (Чёрный квадрат, 1992) as Rakitin
- The Russian Singer (Русская певица, 1993) as Pyotr Demichev
- Queen Margot (Королева Марго, 1996) as Prosecutor Lyagel
- Brezhnev (Брежнев, 2005) as Mikhail Suslov
- The State Counsellor (Статский советник, 2005) as Aronzon the chemist
- Adjutants of Love (Адъютанты любви, 2005) as Peter Ludwig von der Pahlen
- Anyone but Them (Только не они, 2018) as scientist
- Wolf (Волк, 2020) as Vyacheslav Dashkevich

=== Director ===
- Everyone Dreams about a Dog (Каждый мечтает о собаке, 1975)
- He is Missing and Found (Пропал и нашёлся, 1976)
- Hello, River! (Здравствуй, река! 1978)
