= Guest from the Future =

1985 Soviet science fiction miniseries directed by Pavel Arsyonov

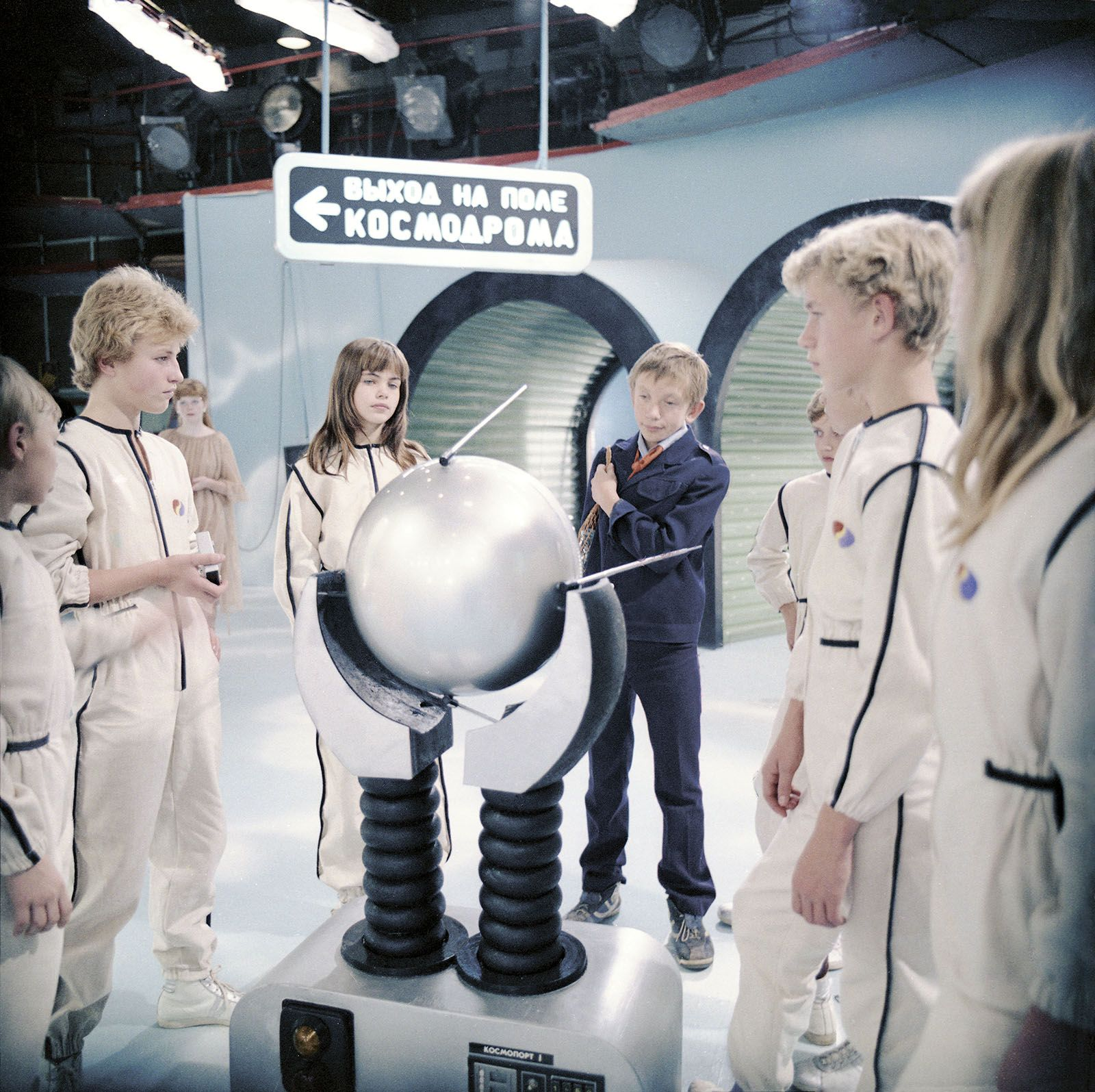
- Also known as: Visitor from the Future
- Genre: Science fiction for romantic drama
- Created by: Kir Bulychov
- Written by: Pavel Arsenov; Kir Bulychov
- Directed by: Pavel Arsenov
- Starring: Natalya Guseva; Aleksei Fomkin; Maryana Ionesyan; Ilya Naumov
- Theme music composer: Yevgeny Krylatov
- Country of origin: Soviet Union
- Original language: Russian
- No. of episodes: 5

Production
- Producers: Soviet Central Television; Gorky Film Studio
- Editor: Tatyana Malyavina
- Running time: 60 minutes

Original release
- Network: Programme One
- Release: March 25 – March 29, 1985

Related
- The Mystery of the Third Planet

Guest from the Future (Russian: Гостья из будущего, Gostya iz budushchego) is a five-part Soviet children's science fiction television miniseries, made at Gorky Film Studio, first aired in 1985. It is based on the 1978 novel One Hundred Years Ahead (Russian: Сто лет тому вперёд, Sto let tomu vperyod) by Kir Bulychov.

The series starred Natalya Guseva as Alisa Seleznyova, a girl from the future who travels to the present and Aleksei Fomkin as Kolya Gerasimov, a boy, who lives in the year 1984 and travels to the year 2084.

The series was highly popular in the Soviet Union. It is still periodically aired in former Soviet nations, as well as other countries.

== Plot ==
=== Part 1 ===
Two schoolboys, Young Pioneers Kolya Gerasyimov and Fima Korolyov, follow a mysterious strange lady to an abandoned house. When they enter the house, they find no trace of the stranger, but in the empty basement Kolya discovers a secret door that leads to a room with a technical device in it. Curious Kolya starts pressing some buttons and activates the device that "transfers" him to another place. We learn that this place is the institute of time research. Employees return from time travels to different periods and deliver artifacts that are inventoried by Werther, an android who holds a secret crush on the stranger whose name is Polina. Kolya sneaks around the corridors but is eventually caught by Werther, who starts inventorying him, assuming that he was brought in by Polina. It is at this point that Kolya learns that he has travelled through time to the year 2084. Werther considers putting him in the museum, but then decides to send him back in time in order to cover up what he thinks to be Polina's mistake. Kolya persuades him to let him catch some sights of the future first. On his exploration, Kolya learns about teletransportation, humanoid aliens, antigravity and space flight. He also makes contact with a grandpa Pavel, a 130-year-old man who is intrigued by his 1980s school uniform.

=== Part 2 ===
Having reached the space port, Kolya unsuccessfully tries to get a ticket for an interplanetary flight. However, by joining a group of pupils who escort their project satellite to the launch, he manages to enter the transit area. There he witnesses how two service workers are stunned and then impersonated by two shape-shifting aliens that have emerged from a crate. Back in the waiting hall, Kolya meets grandpa Pavel again (who turns out to be Polina's future father-in-law) and tells about what he just saw, but the old man dismisses it as child's fantasies. Grandpa Pavel introduces Kolya to Prof. Seleznyov, director of the interplanetary zoo. Kolya spots the shape-shifters again. They lure grandpa Pavel away from the group, stun and impersonate him. The fake grandpa Pavel introduces the other shape-shifter, who is now turned into a short man in a colourful costume to Prof. Seleznyov as a fellow scientist from another planet. The "scientist" shows conspicuous interest in a device called "myelophone", a mind-reading box. Seleznyov mentions that the device is with his daughter Alisa Seleznyova in the interplanetary zoo. Kolya spots and awakens the real grandpa Pavel who tells him that the aliens are space pirates and that Alisa is in danger, yet he is too weak to go with Kolya to help Alisa. He asks Kolya to find Alisa. In the zoo, the pirates in new disguise steal the myelophone from Alisa who tries to read animal minds. However, with the help of a man and his talking goat named Napoleon, Kolya can recover the device and temporarily escapes from the pirates in an air chase. He returns to the institute. While Kolya activates the time machine, Werther sacrifices himself trying to stop the pirates. Once they beat Werther, the space pirates use the machine to follow Kolya into the past. Meanwhile, Alisa, chasing the pirates, has reached the institute and uses the time machine as well. In the 20th century, Kolya escapes while Alisa, not accustomed to 20th-century traffic, is hit by a trolleybus. Kolya and Fima discuss what to do with the myelophone. The pirates install themselves in the abandoned house and wait.

=== Part 3 ===
Alisa is in hospital, recovering after the accident and faking amnesia in order to hide her origin. However, she talks about dolphin languages and exotic fruits. Her roommate Yulya thinks she just makes up those stories but likes her anyway. In the night, Kolya and Fima enter the basement of the abandoned house but the entrance to the time machine is blocked. On their way back out they barely evade the pirates. Alisa finds out that Yulya attends the same school as Kolya (whom she never saw but whose data she got from the talking goat). She confesses to Yulya that she is from the future and that Kolya has taken something from her. They are interrupted by the shape-shifters posing as the doctor and "Alisa's father". When they cannot find the myelophone, the pirates leave. At dawn the girls run away from the hospital to Yulya's place. When they meet Fima, Yulya introduces Alisa to him as a friend from far away. Alisa tells Yulya that now Kolya is in danger because he has the myelophone. Yulya has their escape covered up by her grandmother. Meanwhile, the boys are turning more and more paranoid and start acting like in spy movies. Fima has correctly guessed that Alisa is the Alisa from the future. One pirate comes too late to take Alisa from the hospital but manages to retrieve Yulya's address. Yulya's grandmother arranges for Alisa to be temporarily schooled in Yulya's school in order to find the right Kolya (as there are three and Alisa does not know his family name). She also brushes off the pirate who comes to ask for the girls. The pirates decide to surveil both Yulya's place and her school.

=== Part 4 ===
Alisa is admitted to school, excels in English class and also receives letters from classmates. Fima, triumphant that his predictions have come true so far, wonders whether Alisa will try to eliminate Kolya as witness if he gives her the myelophone. He explains to Kolya the danger of creating alternative timelines by using knowledge from the future. The pirates and the girls spot each other in a pedestrian precinct. A chase ensues but a neighbour with a big dog scares away the pirate. In class, the girls start interrogating the three Kolyas. The right Kolya is scared but is saved by Fima distracting the girls with a story of being in love. In a park, Kolya hides from a pirate. At home, the girls wonder why none of the Kolyas seemed to be the right one. Later the pirates observe the children during sports. Alisa exceeds in long jump, sparking interest not only in the pirates but also in a talent scout. The pirates decide to kidnap Alisa but the girls see their reflection in a shop window. They run away but are stopped by the talent scout who demands to see more of Alisa's abilities. When the girls finally arrive home, they find themselves sieged by the pirates. They disguise as an adult to leave the house on the next morning. In the park, the pirates approach one of the Kolyas but he annoys them by being overly talkative. They trick another classmate into showing them the school's back entrance. Meanwhile, Kolya has picked up the myelophone from home and sneaks it in Yulya's schoolbag. A pirate enters the class disguised as teacher and calls out Alisa to check her schoolbag. When the real teacher encounters her copy, she drops unconscious. Kolya confesses to Alisa that he is the one who took the myelophone and runs away, distracting the pirates' attention from Alisa. After a long chase, Kolya is caught, stunned and taken away. A witness (the school's track coach) is frightened into silence.

=== Part 5 ===
Alisa has run after the pirates and Kolya but has lost their track. The witness leads her in the wrong direction. The other children arrive to help searching, as Yulya has told them Alisa's secret. They worry that Kolya may be tortured in order to reveal where he keeps the myelophone. Fima believes that the device is still at Kolya's place and runs there in order to pick it up before the pirates arrive. The other children search the building where Alisa lost Kolya's track. In the abandoned house, the pirates start interrogating Kolya. Meanwhile, Yulya reaches for a snack in her schoolbag and discovers the myelophone. The children use it to scan the remaining flats in the building. Alisa spots the witness and uses the myelophone on him. His thoughts tell that two men carried an unconscious boy to the abandoned house. The children approach the house and are noticed by the pirates who also realise that Alisa carries the myelophone. As Kolya has fallen unconscious from the torture, the pirates assume his shape. One distracts most children, the other lures Alisa into the house. While she cares for Kolya, the pirate takes the myelophone. However, the talent scout has also entered the house. When the pirate threatens her, she throws him out of the window. The other pirate takes the myelophone from him and tries to leave him behind in the 20th century. However, the access to the time machine is still blocked. The children rush in but one pirate fires his blaster, forcing the children to retreat. The door to the time machine opens and Polina enters in order to arrest the pirates. They fire on her as well but she is protected by a force field and paralyses them. Alisa says goodbye and tells the children what they are going to become in the future. While she enters the secret chamber and the door closes, we hear the song "The Beautiful Afar".

== Cast ==
- Natalya Guseva as Alisa Seleznyova
- Aleksei Fomkin as Kolya Gerasimov
- Maryana Ionesyan as Yulya Gribkova
- Ilya Naumov as Fima Korolyov
- Vyacheslav Nevinny as Veselchak U (lit. Jolly Man U), spaceport employee
- Mikhail Kononov as Krys (lit. Tom-rat), spaceport employee
- Georgi Burkov as Alik Borisovich (doctor)
- Yevgeni Gerasimov as Robot Werther
- Valentina Talyzina as Mariya Pavlovna, head nurse of the hospital
- Natalya Varley as Marta Erastovna, track and field coach
- Lyudmila Arinina as Yulya's Granny
- Yelena Metyolkina as Polina, employee of the Institute of Time
- Vladimir Nosik as Grandpa Pavel, Polina's father-in-law
- Yuri Grigoryev as Professor Seleznyov, Alisa's father
- Mariya Sternikova as Shurochka, nurse
- Andrei Gradov as Ishutin
- Igor Yasulovich as Electron Ivanovich, KosmoZoo employee
- Inna Churkina as one of the schoolgirls at the spaceport

== Soundtrack ==
"The Beautiful Afar" (Prekrasnoe dalyoko) - Theme song

The song was performed by the Big Children's Choir as the theme song for the series, it was composed by Yevgeny Krylatov with words by Yuri Entin (Sample (YouTube)). The song's popularity soon separated from the miniseries, and it became iconic in its own right; it was widely performed by various choirs and sung in everyday life. It was one of the BCC's big 1980s hit songs, and was covered by the Soviet musical trio Meridian within months of the series finale at the request of its composer, this cover version in the style of the bard movement of the early 80s would also be a sensation, being featured in the 1985 Pesnya goda festival finals.

== Cultural influence ==
Many Soviet schoolboys fell in love with Alisa Seleznyova played by Natalya Guseva, who had got a lot of letters from fans. This phenomenon was called as "Alisomania" (Алисомания) and had a large scale.
