= List of Soviet films of 1989 =

Title	Russian title	Director	Cast	Genre	Notes
1989
Abduction of the Wizard	Похищение чародея	Viktor Kobzev	Yulia Aug, Romualdas Ramanauskas, Sergey Varchuk, Vladimir Gostyukhin	Science fiction	
Anarchy	Беспредел	Igor Gostev	Andrey Tashkov, Anton Androsov	Drama	
Anecdote	Анекдот	Yefim Abramov, Nizami Musayev	Rasim Balayev, Jeyhun Mirzayev, Yashar Nuri	Comedy, drama	
Anna: 6 - 18	Анна: от 6 до 18	Nikita Mikhalkov	Anna Mikhalkova	Experimental documentary	
Before Sunrise	Перед рассветом	Yaropolk Lapshin	Valeri Ryzhakov, Aleksandr Pankratov-Chyorny	Action	
Besame	Бесаме	Nino Akhvlediani	Dato Gabunia	Drama	
Black Rose Is an Emblem of Sorrow, Red Rose Is an Emblem of Love	Чёрная роза — эмблема печали, красная роза — эмблема любви	Sergei Solovyov	Tatyana Drubich, Aleksandr Abdulov	Comedy	Screened at the 1990 Cannes Film Festival
Crash – Cop's Daughter	Авария — дочь мента	Mikhail Tumanishvili	Vladimir Ilyin, Oksana Arbuzova	Drama	
The Criminal Quartet	Криминальный квартет	Aleksandr Muratov	Nikolai Karachentsov, Vladimir Steklov	Action	
The Drayman and the King	Биндюжник и Король	Vladimir Alenikov	Armen Dzhigarkhanyan, Zinoviy Gerdt	Comedy	
Entrance to the Labyrinth	Вход в лабиринт	Valeriy Kremnev	Igor Kostolevsky, Ivars Kalniņš, Yuriy Nazarov, Zhanna Prokhorenko	Crime	
The Feasts of Belshazzar, or a Night with Stalin	Пиры Валтасара, или Ночь со Сталиным	Yuri Kara	Aleksei Petrenko, Aleksandr Feklistov, Valentin Gaft, Yevgeniy Yevstigneyev	Historical drama	
Freeze Die Come to Life	Замри, умри, воскресни	Vitali Kanevsky	Dinara Drukarova	Drama	Won the Caméra d'Or at the 1990 Cannes Film Festival
From the Life of Fyodor Kuzkin	Из жизни Фёдора Кузькина	Stanislav Rostotsky	Aleksandr Susnin, Tatyana Bedova	Drama	
Hard to Be a God	Трудно быть богом	Peter Fleischmann	Edward Zentara, Alexander Philippenko, Andrei Boltnev, Werner Herzog	Science fiction	Soviet-French-West German co-production
How Dark the Nights Are on the Black Sea	В городе Сочи тёмные ночи	Vasili Pichul	Aleksei Zharkov, Natalya Negoda, Anastasiya Vertinskaya, Alexander Lenkov	Comedy	Screened at the 1990 Cannes Film Festival
The Initiated	Посвящённый	Oleg Teptsov	Gor Oganisyan, Lyubov Polishchuk	Drama	
Intergirl	Интердевочка	Pyotr Todorovsky	Elena Yakovleva, Vsevolod Shilovsky, Zinovy Gerdt, Lyubov Polishchuk	Drama	
It	Оно	Sergei Ovcharov	Rolan Bykov, Natalya Gundareva	Comedy	
It Happened Near the Sea	Это было у моря	Ayan Shakhmaliyeva	Valentina Ananina, Irina Annina	Drama	
Katala	Катала	Sergei Bodrov, Alexander Buravsky	Valeriy Garkalin, Yelena Safonova	Crime drama	
To Kill a Dragon	Убить дракона	Mark Zakharov	Aleksandr Abdulov, Oleg Yankovsky, Yevgeny Leonov, Vyacheslav Tikhonov, Aleksandra Zakharova, Viktor Rakov	Fantasy	Soviet-West Germany co-production
Mother	Мать	Gleb Panfilov	Inna Churikova	Drama	Entered into the 1990 Cannes Film Festival
The Red Flute	Месть	Yermek Shinarbayev	Aleksandr Pan	Drama	Screened at the 1991 Cannes Film Festival
The Servant	Слуга	Vadim Abdrashitov	Oleg Borisov	Drama	Entered into the 39th Berlin International Film Festival
Stray Dogs	Псы	Dmitry Svetozarov	Sergey Kokovkin, Andrey Krasko	Thriller	
A Trip to Wiesbaden	Поездка в Висбаден	Yevgeni Gerasimov	Sergey Zhigunov, Yelena Seropova	Drama	
Two arrows. Stone Age Detective	Две стрелы. Детектив каменного века	Alla Surikova	Alexander Kuznetsov, Armen Dzhigarkhanyan, Olga Kabo, Nikolai Karachentsov	Crime	
A Visitor to a Museum	Посетитель музея	Konstantin Lopushansky	Viktor Mikhaylov	Science fiction	Entered into the 16th Moscow International Film Festival
The Witches Cave	Подземелье ведьм	Yuri Moroz	Sergey Zhigunov, Marina Levtova, Dmitry Pevtsov, Nikolai Karachentsov	Science fiction	
Yolki-palki	Ёлки-палки!	Sergei Nikonenko	Sergei Nikonenko, Ekaterina Voronina	Comedy	
Zerograd	Город Зеро	Karen Shakhnazarov	Leonid Filatov, Oleg Basilashvili, Vladimir Menshov, Armen Dzhigarkhanyan, Yevgeniy Yevstigneyev	Comedy, drama	Was as selected as the Soviet entry for the Best Foreign Language Film at the 62nd Academy Awards, but was not accepted as a nominee.
