= List of foreign adaptations of The Nanny =

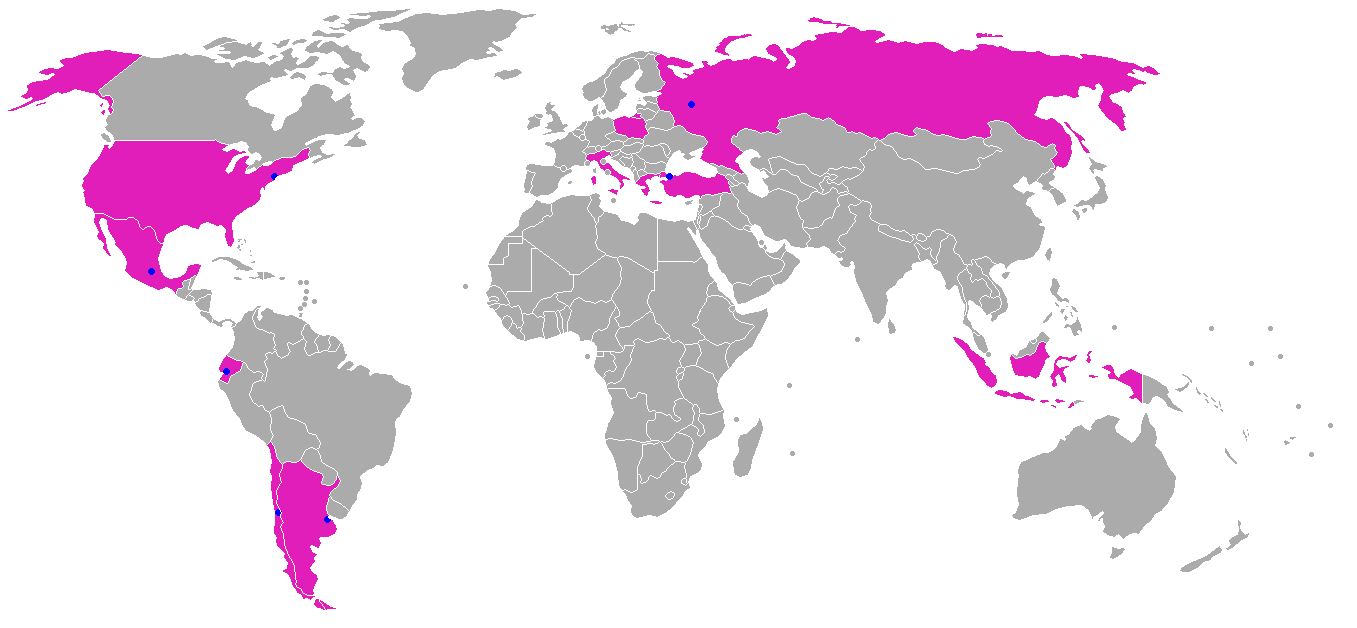
Countries with local versions

This is list of all foreign adaptations of the American situation comedy The Nanny (1993–1999).

Although the show has been broadcast in more than ninety countries, several local versions of the show have been produced in other countries, particularly in Latin America, Eastern Europe, and a number of Asian markets. These shows follow the original scripts very closely, but with minor alterations in order to adapt to their respective country's culture.

== Argentina ==
La Niñera

- Set in Buenos Aires
- Stars Florencia Peña as Florencia Finkel ("Fran") and Boy Olmi as Juan Manuel Iraola ("Max")
- Florencia is from Lanús
- Juan Manuel lives in Barrio Parque
- Broadcast on Telefe beginning in 2004
- Guest stars included Chayanne, Gabriel Corrado, Catherine Fulop, Valeria Lynch, Patricia Sosa, Arturo Puig, Cacho Castaña, Juan Manuel Tenuta, Moria Casán, María Rosa Gallo, Martha Bianchi, Carla Peterson, Carlos Belloso, Rodolfo Barilli, Cristina Perez, Antonio Carrizo and Fernando Peña, among others.
- Reruns of the show have been broadcast in Venezuela, Puerto Rico and in the satellite network Telefé Internacional.

== Chile ==
La Nany

- Set in Santiago
- Stars Alejandra Herrera as Eliana Tapia Cárdenas "Nany" ("Fran") and Alex Zisis as Max Valdivieso ("Max")
- Eliana is from La Florida
- Max is a publicist who lives in La Dehesa
- Broadcast on MEGA (Red Televisiva Megavisión) beginning in 2005

== Ecuador ==
La Niñera

- Set in Guayaquil
- Stars Paola Farías as María "Mary" ("Fran") and Frank Bonilla (First Season) / Juan Carlos Salazar (Second Season) as Carlos Eduardo Sáenz de Tejada ("Max")
- Mary is from Chone
- Carlos Eduardo is a hotelier who lives in Samborondón
- Broadcast on Ecuavisa

== Greece ==
Η Νταντά

- Stars Maria Lekaki (Μαρία Λεκάκη) as Mary ("Fran") and Kostas Apostolidis (Κώστας Αποστολίδης) as Aris ("Max")
- Broadcast on Mega Channel seasons 2003-2004 and 2004–2005

== Indonesia ==
The Nanny

- Broadcast on Indosiar beginning 25 September 2006

== Italy ==
In Italy, the American series was heavily redubbed and renamed La tata ("The Nanny" in Italian). It was broadcast on Italia 1 and in the Italian dub Fran Fine was renamed Francesca Cacace, Italian nanny from Frosinone, a town of Lazio, a region of Central Italy. Sylvia Fine was renamed "Zia Assunta" ("Aunt Assunta"), a relative of Francesca's family offering a shelter to her niece. Yetta Rosenberg was renamed "Zia Yetta" ("Aunt Yetta"), Polish, the few bits of her backstory provided altered to hide her Jewish origins. Val Toriello was renamed "Lalla Toriello". Francesca Cacace was no longer of Jewish heritage, but hailing from a Roman Catholic family, having become a lapsed Catholic ("The Kibbutz" is, in fact, a pretty unclear episode in the Italian version). Almost every reference to Jewish religion was altered accordingly in the show. In the Italian adaptation, Francesca's parents live in Italy and the only relatives emigrated in America with her are her two aunts, Yetta and Assunta, and her uncle, Assunta's husband Antonio, whose face is never seen (we can hear him having few shouted lines or see his wig from above). Italian dubbing also modifies some characteristics of the neighborhood where Max lives.

== Mexico ==
La Niñera

- Set in Mexico City
- Stars Lisset as Francisca Flores "Fran" and Francisco de la O as Maximiliano Fábregas "Max"
- Francisca is from the Roma neighborhood
- Maximiliano is a theater producer who resides in the upscale Polanco neighborhood
- Begun July 18, 2007 in TV Azteca.

El Niñero

- A gender-swapped version ("The Manny" in English).
- Stars Iván Amozurrutia as Gabriel Padilla, the manny, and Sandra Echeverría as Ximena Lemus (Maxwell counterpart).
- There are 2 sons and one daughter instead of 2 daughters and 1 son from the original series.
- Niles is a female housekeeper
- Takes place in Guadalajara, Jalisco
- Gabriel comes from Tepatitlan de Morelos, Jalisco
- Released December 24, 2023 on Netflix

== Poland ==
Niania

- Set in Warsaw
- Stars Agnieszka Dygant as Frania Maj ("Fran"), Tomasz Kot as Maks Skalski ("Max"), Tamara Arciuch-Szyc as Karolina ("C.C.") and Adam Ferency as Konrad ("Niles")
- Maksymilian Skalski ("Max") became a movie and TV series producer, as opposed to a theatrical producer
- The origins of Franciszka Maj ("Fran") are not clear, she comes from Praga (an old district on the other side of Vistula river, which is considered to be the poorer and more dangerous area of the city.)
- Niania is the closest to The Nanny of all the foreign remakes (including sets, food and actors' costumes)
- Broadcast on TVN beginning on September 10, 2005 and ending on October 24, 2009

== Portugal ==
A Ama

- Set in Lisbon
- Stars Rita Pereira
- Broadcast on TVI beginning in 2020

== Russia ==
My Fair Nanny

- Set in Moscow
- Includes 173 episodes
- Stars Anastasia Zavorotnyuk (Анастасия Заворотнюк) as Vicka ("Fran"), Sergei Zhigunov (Сергей Жигунов) as Maxim ("Max"), Olga Prokofyeva (Ольга Прокофьева) as Jeanna ("C.C.") and Boris Smolkin (Борис Смолкин) as Konstantin ("Niles")
- Vicka is from Biryulevo (Бирюлёво), non-prestige Moscow district, and her heritage has been changed from Jewish to Ukrainian
- One of the few adaptations where Max kept his job as a theatrical producer.
- Broadcast on STS beginning in 2004
- One of the first successful sitcoms in Russian television.
- Starting with its fifth season, the show has become a victim of blatant, poorly hidden product placements resulting in it being the butt of many jokes within the Russian pop culture.
- The sixth season was put on hiatus for over a year due to the extremely poor health of the actress playing Vicka's mother. Some episodes actually ended up re-written with the Grandma Yetta character taking over for much of the Sylvia character. The actress died soon after shooting the series finale.
- At the beginning of the sixth season, it is revealed that Maxim's proposal to Vicka was just a dream she had and from that episode on, all the episodes in the series are brand new and are not adapted from the original U.S. version, with Vicka still trying to desperately win Maxim's heart and him trying to hide his true feelings for the Nanny.
- Some of the "new" episodes were actually based on the rejected scripts for the original U.S. version.
- The show eventually came back on track with Vicka and Max getting married and the series concluded exactly like its American counterpart.
- In the Russian version, Vicka appears less smart but more joyful than Fran, Konstanin seems sneakier and less snobbish than Niles (which is emphasized by his small stature), Masha is more laid back than Maggie, Jeanna appears much more emotional and neurotic than CC.
- This series was shot in less time than the original, so children's growing up is less obvious.
- In this version, the butler Konstantin has a surname, as opposed to Niles who never reveals his in the original series. In the pilot episode, he introduces himself to Vicka (and in the second episode, to her mother) as Konstantin Semenov.
- Val's character has two Russian counterparts. In first seasons, Vicka's best friend is named Vera, but when the actress who portrayed her left the series after a feud with the crew, Vera disappeared and another of Vicka's best friends, Galya, resurfaced.
- In 2008, a new, seventh season was announced. Since Lyubov Polishchuk died after shooting the sixth-season finale and the part was not recast, Vicka's mother died off screen as well. Since Vicka cannot stand their old apartment because it reminded her of her mother, the whole family moves to a new house. Now a joyful widower who decides to live his life at full speed, Vicka's father Vladimir, a character meant to replace Vicka's mother and is portrayed by Aleksandr Filippenko, follows them to their new house.

== Turkey ==
Dadı

- Set in Istanbul
- Stars Gülben Ergen as Melek ("Fran"), Kenan Işık as Ömer ("Max") and Haldun Dormen as Pertev ("Niles").
- Melek is from Gaziosmanpaşa district.
- All of the Jewish stereotype jokes were explained away as ghetto stereotype jokes.
- Broadcast on Show TV beginning in 2001
