= La Niñera =

La Niñera may refer to:

- La Niñera (Argentine TV series), an Argentine sitcom, based on the U.S. TV series The Nanny
- La niñera (Mexican TV series), a Mexican sitcom, based on the U.S. TV series The Nanny

== See also ==
- List of foreign adaptations of The Nanny
