= My Seawoman =

1990 Soviet musical comedy film

- Russian: Моя морячка
- Directed by: Anatoly Eyramdzhan
- Written by: Anatoly Eyramdzhan
- Produced by: Serzh Allakhverdov
- Starring: Lyudmila Gurchenko; Tatyana Vasileva; Mikhail Derzhavin; Lyubov Polishchuk; Roman Ryazantsev
- Cinematography: Vadim Alisov
- Edited by: Irina Kolotikova
- Music by: Lyudmila Gurchenko
- Release date: 1990
- Country: Soviet Union
- Language: Russian

My Seawoman (Russian: Моя морячка) is a 1990 Soviet musical comedy film written and directed by Anatoly Eiramdzhan.

== Plot ==
The film takes place in a resort town in the Crimea (the shooting took place in Koktebel), where the competition Where are you, talents? takes place every day. Suddenly a man comes from Murmansk, sings the song My Seawoman and demands the main prize.

== Cast ==
According to kino-teatr.ru

- Lyudmila Gurchenko as Lyudmila Pashkova, master of ceremonies
- Tatyana Vasileva as Tatyana Ptashuk, accompanist
- Mikhail Derzhavin as Mikhail Gudkov
- Lyubov Polishchuk as lambada dancer
- Roman Ryazantsev as Kolya, son of Pashkova
- Anastasiya Nemolyaeva as Masha, girlfriend of Kolya
- Georgy Martirosyan (actor) as Suzdalev, actor and friend of Pashkova
- Roksana Babayan as musical instrument rental employee
- Sergey Tsigal as man in the audience
- Yekaterina Zinchenko as Gudkov's colleague in Moscow
- Anatoly Eiramdzhan as Gudkov's colleague in Moscow (uncredited)

== Trivia ==
The final part of the film was shot in the Moscow Circus. As Actor Roman Ryazantsev tells it, a huge bag of sand crashed down right next to where Lyudmila Gurchenko was standing. The bag was apparently a counterweight used under the circus dome. "If she had stood a little to the left... I still get goosebumps when I remember the incident," Ryazantsev said.
