= Eurasian International University =

University in Moscow, Russia

- Евразийский международный университет
- Type: University
- Established: 2020
- Director: Konstantin Klimenko-Bogdanov
- Location: Stroitelny proyezd 7A, Building 7, Office 2, Moscow, Russia
- Website: evrazuniversitet.com

Eurasian International University (Russian: Евразийский международный университет) is an autonomous non-profit organization for continuing professional education, founded on July 29, 2020. The university's founder is Eurasian Educational Center LLC. The university's rector is Konstantin Klimenko-Bogdanov.

The university comprises eight faculties (Diplomacy, Management and Marketing, International Journalism and Mass Communications, Law, Psychology, Technology, Architecture and Civil Engineering, and Culture and Arts).

The Faculty of Diplomacy's programs include International Relations, International Economic Relations, and the School of Global Leaders. The Faculty of Management and Marketing offers Doctor of Business Administration and The Role of Personal Branding for Success in Business and Social Sphere. The Faculty of International Journalism and Mass Communications offers International Journalism and Public Relations and Corporate Press Secretary. The Faculty of Law offers Corporate Lawyer. The Faculty of Psychology offers Applied Psychology. The Faculty of Technology offers Electronics Engineer (Computer Repair Technician). The Faculty of Architecture and Civil Engineering offers Industrial and Civil Engineering. The Faculty of Culture and Arts offers Cultural Management.

In 2025, Anfisa Chekhova became a student at the Faculty of Psychology University.
