= Pavliuchenkov =

Pavliuchenkov is a surname. Notable people with the surname include:

- Alexander Pavlioutchenkov (born 1985), Russian tennis player
- Anastasia Pavlyuchenkova (born 1991), Russian tennis player
- Victor Pavlyuchenkov (1963–2021), Russian-Soviet actor and stuntman
