= Gulnara Nizhinskaya =

Russian actress and television presenter

- Гульнара Нижинская
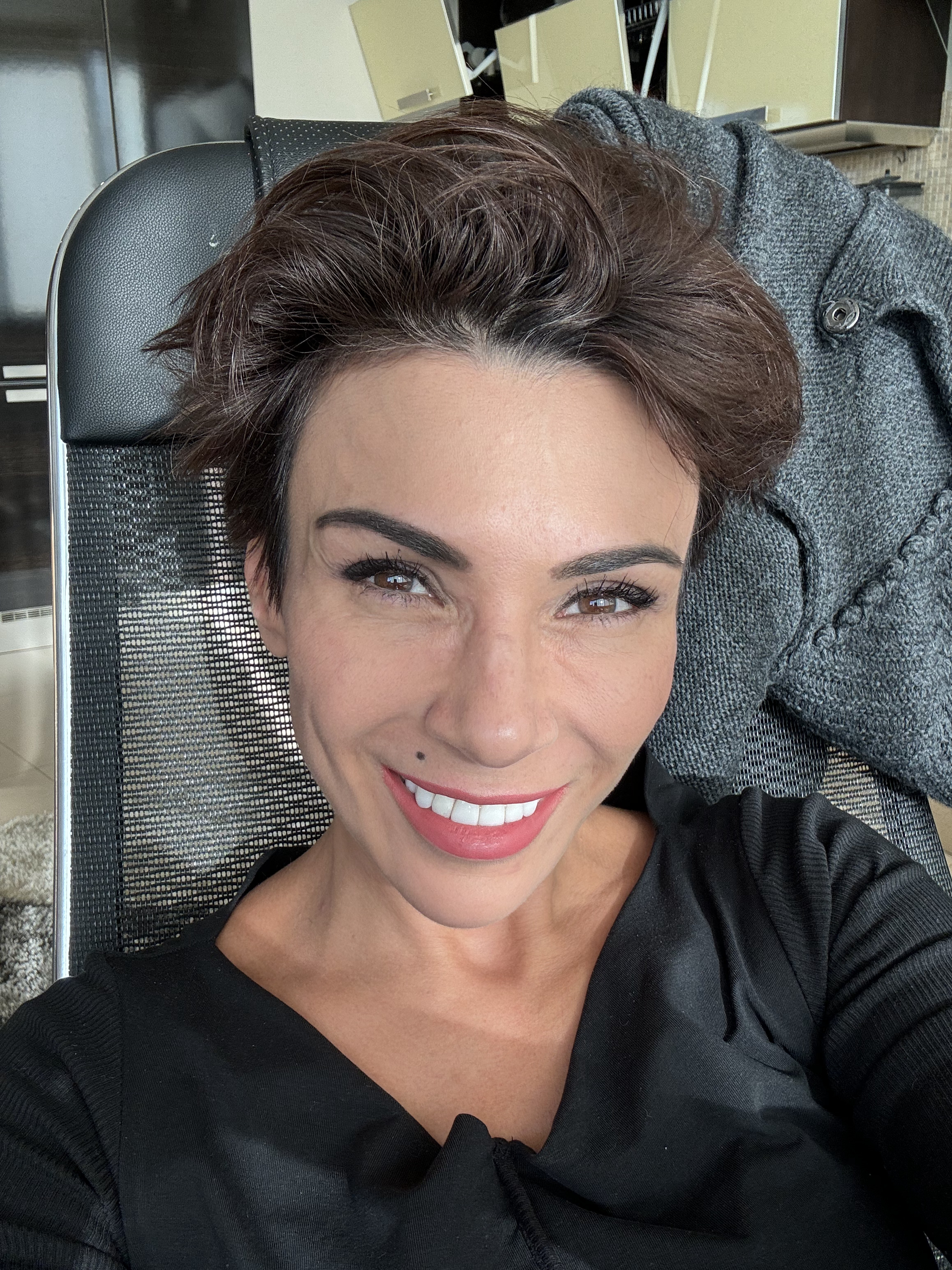
- Nizhinskaya in 2024
- Born: Gulnara Gasanovna Nizhinskaya; 19 July 1976 (age 49); Pyatigorsk, Russian SFSR, Soviet Union
- Occupations: Actress; producer
- Years active: 1997 — present

Gulnara Gasanovna Nizhinskaya (Russian: Гульнара Гасановна Нижинская; born 19 July 1976, Pyatigorsk, Stavropol Krai) is a Russian film and theater actress, event host, and producer. Nizhinskaya has appeared in various Russian films and television series; however, she is primarily recognized for her role in the television series My Fair Nanny. She has been a member of the Writers' Union of Israel since 2011.

== Biography ==
Nizhinskaya was born in Pyatigorsk, Stavropol Krai, into a Mountain Jewish family. Her father, Hasan Borisovich Mirzoev, is a lawyer. In 1990, her family emigrated to the United States, where she completed high school in New York. In 1993, she returned to Russia to pursue acting studies and was admitted to the Gerasimov Institute of Cinematography (VGIK), where she studied under Anatoli Romashin.

In 1994, she enrolled at the American Theatre Academy — the Serguei Melkonian Drama Academy — located at the Harlequin Theater in the United States. In 1996, together with her husband, she founded the Nijinsky Theatre.

In 1998, she continued her training at the Michael Chekhov International Workshop in Strasbourg, France. She later graduated in 2001 from the Boris Shchukin Theatre Institute, where she studied under Aleksandr Shirvindt.

Between 2001 and 2003, Nizhinskaya worked at the La Chauve-Souris, followed by a tenure at the Moscow Satire Theatre from 2003 to 2004.

Since 2002, she has served as the Artistic Director of the Central House of Lawyers (CDH) in Moscow.

Nizhinskaya rose to fame with the television series My Fair Nanny, which premiered in 2004, where she played Vera, the friend of the nanny Vika.

In 2008, she completed the High Courses for Scriptwriters and Film Directors of acclaimed director Vladimir Menshov.

Since 2009, Nizhinskaya has been affiliated with the National Film Actors' Theatre and the Independent Theatre Enterprise of L. Zhivitchenko.

In 2010, she assumed several roles, including Deputy Artistic Director of the Arlequin Theater, Creative Producer at TO S'kit Media, and Public Relations Advisor to the President of the Guild of Russian Lawyers.

Since 2011, she has held the position of General Producer at Luxema Production and Artistic Director of Luxema Film Studio.

In 2019, she launched the Guild of Beauty Experts, a project aimed at connecting professionals in the beauty industry.

Since 2024, Nizhinskaya has been working in Phuket, Thailand, as a media producer for international projects, representing Maikhao Dream Co. In 2025, she became PR Executive Producer for the BRICS Investment Forum and also produced media campaigns for Maikhao Dream Villas & Spa and Phuket Fashion Week.

In March 2025, she recorded the final interview with Russian comedian Pasha Technique, who died a month later.

== Personal life ==
Nizhinskaya was previously in a relationship with actor Boris Tenin. She is currently divorced and has a son named Leonard.

== Awards ==
- 2011 – Best Experimental Film at the International Short Film and Animation Festival "Meters" for Closeness.net (directed by Gulnara Nizhinskaya).
- 2011 – Winner of the Green Apple Festival of Young Cinema for Closeness.net, "For creating a modern image of loneliness and the attempt to escape it using minimalistic means"(directed by Gulnara Nizhinskaya).
- 2011 – Best Cinematography at the Moscow International Art-Izo-Fest Cinema Festival for Closeness.net (cinematographer: Dmitry Efimkin)

== Partial filmography ==
Year	Title	Role
1997	Snake Spring	
2004	Balzac's Age, or All Men Are Bastards...	Sonya's friend
2005	My Fair Nanny	Vera Romanyuk
2005	Kulagin and partners	Daria Pirogova
2005	Hunting on asphalt	Polyakova
2005	Challenge	Nina
2005	Soldiers	Bagheera
2005	Nobody Knows About Sex	girl on the balcony
2009	Trace	Margo
2018	Unforgiven	
2022	Dyldy	conductor
