= Vadim Shmelyov =

- Born: Vadim Shmelyov; August 30, 1967 (age 57); Aleksin, Soviet Union (now Russia)
- Citizenship: Russian Federation
- Occupation(s): film director, screenwriter, producer

Vadim Viktorovich Shmelyov (Russian: Вадим Викторович Шмелёв; born August 30, 1967) is a Russian film director, screenwriter and producer.

== Biography ==
Vadim was born on August 30, 1967. He studied at Russian State Institute of Performing Arts as a drama director (1990-1995).

== Filmography (selected) ==
- Moscow Mission (2006)
- The Apocalypse Code (2007)
- S. S. D. (2008)
- The Last Frontier (2020)
