= Aleksey Bardukov =

Russian actor

- Алексей Бардуков
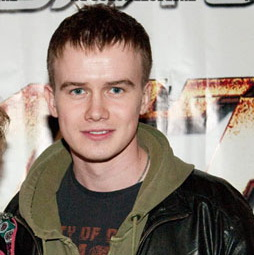
- Bardukov at the premiere of the film Hooked on the Game 2. The Next Level, April 15, 2010
- Born: Aleksey Igorevich Bardukov; November 18, 1984; Moscow, RSFSR, USSR
- Occupation: Actor
- Years active: 2002–present

Aleksey Igorevich Bardukov (Russian: Алексей Игоревич Бардуков; born November 18, 1984) is a Russian theatre actor and dubbing. He appeared in over 40 films.

== Early life ==
Aleksey was born on November 18, 1984, into a large family. In 2001, after graduating from school, Aleksey Bardukov successfully passed the exams simultaneously at the Russian Institute of Theatre Arts, at the Boris Shchukin Theatre Institute and at the Moscow Art Theatre School, but chose the Moscow Art Theatre, since the course was typed by Konstantin Raikin.

In 2004 he made his first film debut.

== Selected filmography ==
| Year | Title | Role | Notes |
|---|---|---|---|
| 2009 | Hooked on the Game | Maksim | |
| 2013 | Metro | Denis Istomin | |
| 2020 | The Last Frontier | Afanasy Alyoshkin | |
| 2023 | Nuremberg | Senior Lieutenant Zaitsev | |
