= The Apocalypse Code =

- Directed by: Vadim Shmelyov
- Written by: Denis Karyshev
- Produced by: Sergey Zhigunov; Sergey Gribkov
- Starring: Anastasia Zavorotnyuk; Vincent Perez; Vladimir Menshov; Aleksei Serebryakov; Trond Lyngbø; Sean Lahooti; Oleg Stefan; Boris Tokarev
- Cinematography: Dayan Gaytkulov
- Edited by: Dmitry Slobtsov
- Music by: Dmitry Dankov
- Distributed by: Karoprokat
- Release date: October 2, 2007
- Running time: 105 min.
- Country: Russia
- Language: Russian
- Budget: $15 million

The Apocalypse Code (Russian: «Код апокалипсиса», romanized: Kod apokalipsisa) is a 2007 Russian action film. Apart from Russia, the filming took place in France, Italy, Norway, Malaysia and Ukraine. The crew spent 10 days shooting scenes in the Alvøen Island and Aurlandsfjorden.

== Plot ==
Terrorist Jaffad Ben Zayidi steals four nuclear bombs from a sunken American submarine and hides them in four major cities throughout the world. The charges can be activated by an 11-digit code. Zayidi dies and his accomplice, nicknamed "The Executioner," is about to blow up the bombs. The Executioner is chased by FSB, whose agent Marie has previously infiltrated Zayidi's team.
