= The Last Frontier (2020 film) =

- Film poster
- Directed by: Vadim Shmelyov
- Written by: Vadim Shmelyov; Igor Ugolnikov; Viacheslav Fetisov
- Produced by: Igor Ugolnikov (ru); Evgeniy Ayzikovich; Igor Furmanyuk; Leonid Melamud
- Starring: Aleksey Bardukov; Evgeniy Dyatlov; Sergey Bezrukov; Lubov Konstantinova; Artyom Gubin; Igor Yudin
- Cinematography: Andrey Gurkin
- Edited by: Mariya Sergeenkova
- Music by: Yuri Poteyenko
- Production company: VoenFilm
- Distributed by: Central Partnership
- Release date: November 4, 2020 (Russia)
- Running time: 130 minutes
- Country: Russia
- Language: Russian
- Budget: ₽450 million
- Box office: ₽87.7 million

The Last Frontier also released as The Final Stand (Russian: Подольские курсанты, romanized: Podolskie kursanty, lit. 'Podolsk cadets') is a 2020 Russian WWII film written and directed by Vadim Shmelyov. A story about the heroic performance of the Podolsk cadets (ru) at the Battle of Moscow in October 1941.

== Plot ==
In October 1941, near Moscow, cadets from the Podolsk artillery and infantry schools, on the brink of completing their training and becoming commanders, are abruptly ordered to guard the Ilyinsky line of defense. Two close friends, who had been competing for the affections of a young woman, now face reality: the German forces have broken through the front, and a tank column is advancing towards Moscow. With regular army units stretched thin, these cadets—essentially still boys—become the primary defense. In fierce battles against overwhelming enemy forces, they hold their ground, sacrificing their lives to fulfill their mission and buying time until reinforcements can arrive.

== Cast ==
- Aleksey Bardukov as Lieutenant Afanasiy Aleshkin
- Evgeniy Dyatlov as the head of the Podolsk Artillery School, Colonel Ivan Strelbitskiy
- Sergey Bezrukov as Captain Ivan Starchak
- Lubov Konstantinova as Junior Sergeant Mariya 'Masha' Grigorieva, nurse
- Artyom Gubin as Junior Sergeant Aleksandr 'Sashka' Lavrov, cadet
- Igor Yudin as Sergeant Mitya Shemyakin, cadet
- Guram Bablishvili as Lieutenant Museridze
- Dmitriy Solomykin as Lieutenant Shapovalov
- Roman Madyanov as Major General Vasily Smirnov
- Yekaterina Rednikova as Military doctor Nikitina
- Sergey Bondarchuk Jr. as Major Dementyev
- Darya Ursulyak as Liza Aleshkina
- Daniil Spivakovsky as engineer Uglov
- Vasiliy Mishchenko as Lieutenant General Eliseev
- Gleb Bochkov as Sergeant Yakhin
- Oleg Ots as Bogatov, cadet
- Aleksey Kopashov as Simonov
- Gleb Danilov as Slavik Nikitin
- Aleksey Takharov as Azamat Khalilov, cadet
- Dmitry Topol as Ibragimov, cadet
- Pavel Stont as Vasilkov, cadet
- Aleksandr Lobanov as Battalion Commissar Andropov
- Stas Shmelev as Senior Lieutenant Nosov
- Nikolay Samsonov as Paramedic Petrov
- Pavel Krainov as Captain Rossikov
- Kirill Zaporozhskiy as Senior political instructor Lepekhin
- Darya Konyzheva as Red Army women Lyusya Shishkina
- Pavel Levkin as Senior Lieutenant Mamchich
- Dmitry Brauer as Germany Major Werner

== Production ==
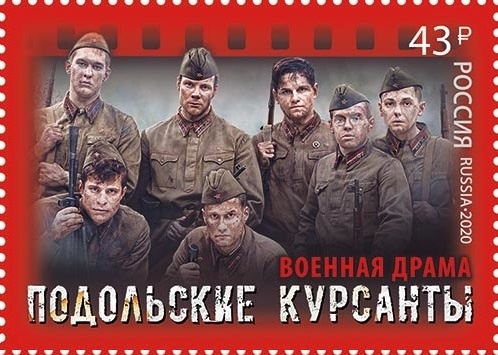
2020 Russian stamp dedicated to the Podolsk cadets’ (2020 film)

The film was shot at a specially built film complex "VoenFilm" in Medyn, where a village was built, pillboxes were dug, a river was built and filled with water, and part of the Varshavskoye Highway was dumped. Historical consultants tried to achieve maximum reliability of what was shown, up to the reconstruction of the numbers of tanks and aircraft; in particular, Bezrukov's character is armed with a Thompson submachine gun, since such a weapon was found during excavations at the Ilyinsky border.

=== Filming ===
The filming location of the feature film took place from August to November 2018, Scenes of Peaceful Days: Ivanovskoe Estate in the Podolsk Urban Okrug, Moscow Oblast and Kaluga Oblast.

The project was supported by the Ministry of Culture of the Russian Federation, the Ministry of Defense of the Russian Federation, the Ministry of Emergency Situations, the Governor of Moscow Oblast and Governor of Kaluga Oblast, deputies of the State Duma, the Russian Youth Union, well-known public and political figures.

The Central Archives of the Russian Ministry of Defence provides advisory support and proper supervision over the credibility of the film.

The supervisory board of the film project is headed by Viacheslav Fetisov.

== Reception ==
=== Budget ===
The film's budget was 450 million rubles, of which 60 million were provided by the Ministry of Culture, the rest was allocated by investors, distributors and a film studio.

== Release ==
The film was released in Russian by Central Partnership on November 4, 2020.

== Awards ==
The film received three awards at the 2021 Prague Independent Film Festival — Grand Prix, Best Director, Best Actor (Sergey Bezrukov) and Best Score.
