= Victor Pavlyuchenkov =

Russian-Soviet stuntman and actor (1963–2021)

- Born: 30 April 1963
- Died: 1 February 2021 (aged 57)
- Occupations: Stuntman; Actor

Victor Pavlyuchenkov (30 April 1963 – 1 February 2021) was a Russian-Soviet actor and stuntman.

== Biography ==
Pavlyuchenkov was born on 30 April 1963. He graduated from the Lunacharsky State Institute for Theatre Arts in 1990 and became a member of the Association of Russian Stuntmen and the Union of Russian Cinematographers. He worked as a screenwriter for television channels such as REN TV, Russia-1, and TV Centre.

Victor Pavlyuchenkov died suddenly on 1 February 2021, at the age of 57. His colleagues have suggested that third parties may have been involved in his death.

== Filmography ==
- Stukach (1988)
- My Fair Nanny (2006)
- Apostol (2008)
- Batyushka (2008)
- Zastava Zhilina (2008)
