= S. S. D. =

- Directed by: Vadim Shmelyov
- Written by: Denis Karyshev; Vadim Shmelyov
- Produced by: Vadim Goryainov; Valery Todorovsky; Ilya Neretin
- Starring: Anfisa Chekhova; Evgeniya Brik
- Cinematography: Oleg Kirichenko
- Music by: Dmitri Dankov; Ilya Lagutenko
- Production companies: Krasnaya Strela; Ankor
- Release date: September 4, 2008
- Running time: 90 minutes
- Country: Russia
- Language: Russian

S. S. D. (Russian: С. С. Д.) is a 2008 Russian slasher film directed by Vadim Shmelyov.

== Plot ==
1984, Young Pioneer camp "Lesnaya Polyana" (lit. 'the Forest Glade') in the suburbs. The female Pioneer counselor goes off on a date, and the male counselor is left alone to entertain the Pioneers with frightening stories about a bus with curtains on windows, a driver with a horse's head and dead passengers without heads. Meanwhile, a very real maniac, Fedotov, known as the "Odintsovsky Ripper", kills the counselor and her boyfriend, and then, in front of the pioneer, sticks the sickle into his own heart.

2008, casting for participation in the reality show Pioneer Camp. Five boys and girls are selected to compete for the main prize, which is one million rubles. They are brought to the territory of the pioneer camp "Lesnaya Polyana", where they meet with the presenter. The territory of the camp is equipped with CCTV cameras, so that the participants of the show are constantly on video, they are handed out microphones and select mobile phones. The invisible director, whose voice is changed using a computer, communicates with the players.

The first task from the "voice" is to conduct a trial rehearsal of the ballot, allegedly before the broadcast. To avoid the friction between players, the novice actor Fedor proposes to vote against him. As a "quitter" he walks along the alley to the video camera, and receives an arrow in the head.

This episode goes on the air of the TV company organizing the show. Special forces arrive in the pioneer camp, but the participants of the show are not found. The operative investigation establishes that the episode of "live broadcast" was filmed a week ago. From this moment in the film there are two story lines in parallel, one of which tells the story of the tragic events in the pioneer camp, the other one - about the progress of the investigation.

"Voice" tells the players about the changed rules: the game is conducted not for money, but for life. A faceless computer voice occasionally tells another childish horror story, after which one of the players dies the death described in this horror story. Players are trying to actively resist the actions of a maniac: throwing out microphones, searching the building, destroying loudspeakers and video cameras, and they arm themselves. At the same time, their numbers are inexorably decreasing.

The remaining six players and the host are barricaded in one of the rooms. The "Voice" suggests to them independently, by vote to determine the next victim. Then everyone is able to prove himself. And the maniac has still a few more surprises left. After all one participant "ate a dead heart". And most importantly, although the guys themselves are sure that the man in the horse mask is going to kill them all, he really wants to leave one person alive: the one who sees the demon, one who likes to toy with people.

== Cast ==
- Anfisa Chekhova as Alisa Ten
- Evgeniya Brik as Yana
- Igor Artashonov as Sergey Andreevich Topilsky, the investigator
- Dmitry Kubasov as Sasha, the hacker
- Ekaterina Kopanova as Vera
- Stas Erdley as Alex
- Artem Mazunov as Pasha
- Stanislav Shmelev as Fyodor
- Ivan Nikolayev as Egor
- Alexander Makogon as Kirill, the TV Producer
- Ekaterina Nosik as Dasha
- Karina Myndrovskaya as Lika
- Pavel Smetankin as Mukhin, the assistant investigator
- Sergey Burunov as the director
- Veronika Ivashchenko as Nastya
- Danila Arikov as the host
- Xenia Turkova as the news anchor on REN TV (cameo)
- Victor Ryabov as the specialist
- Irina Efremova as the female counselor
- Andrey Khvorov as driver
- Dmitry Lomovsky as the male counselor
- Alexey Yanin as the guy
- Yuri Bykov as the masked maniac
