= Valentina Ananina =

Soviet and Russian actress

- Born: Valentina Georgievna Ananina; May 18, 1933 (age 93); Moscow, Russian SFSR, Soviet Union
- Occupation: actress
- Years active: 1955 — present

Valentina Georgievna Ananina (Russian: Валентина Геopгиeвна Ананьина; May 18, 1933, Moscow) is a Soviet and Russian theater and film actress.

== Biography ==
Valentina Ananina was born May 18, 1933, in Moscow.

In 1957 she graduated from the Gerasimov Institute of Cinematography (1957, workshop Yuli Raizman). In the years 1957-1990 actress Studio Theatre of film actor. Valentina Ananina master of the episode, the lists of the most popular actresses of the national cinema has always occupied the first place. The actress had more than 200 roles.

In addition to filming a movie, Valentina worked in the children's Sunday school at the Novodevichy Convent.

== Selected filmography ==
- 1955: The Lesson of Life as Nura, a maid
- 1955: Private Ivan as country girl
- 1957: The Communist as Frosya
- 1957: The Girl Without an Address as Secretary in the office
- 1957: The Cranes Are Flying as Dasha
- 1959: Ballad of a Soldier as countrywoman
- 1961: Nine Days in One Year as an employee of the Institute
- 1963: Walking the Streets of Moscow as saleswoman ice cream
- 1965: Time, Forward! as Member of the team
- 1965: Children of Don Quixote as parent
- 1965: Thirty Three as guests at Lyubashkin family
- 1966: The Tale of Tsar Saltan as nanny
- 1966: The Elusive Avengers as villager
- 1968: The Shield and the Sword as nurse
- 1970: Belorussian Station as Katya, housekeeper of Matveev
- 1971: Shadows at Noon as Mironovna
- 1972: The Stationmaster as Brewer's wife
- 1972: Big School-Break as episode
- 1973: Matters of the Heart as Road workers
- 1974: A Lover's Romance as cousin
- 1974: The Road to Calvary as Hostess with cakes
- 1975: From Dawn Till Sunset as fellow soldiers of Roznov
- 1975: We Didn't Learn This as English Teacher
- 1975: The Last Victim as merchant's wife
- 1978: Siberiade as farmer
- 1983: Cage for Canaries as railway worker
- 1985: Coming Century as teacher
- 1986: Zina-Zinulya as dorm janitor
- 1988: The Noble Robber Vladimir Dubrovsky as Egorovna
- 1989: It Happened Near the Sea
- 1992: Dyuba-Dyuba as mistress of a brothel
- 1997: The Thief as mother of the prisoner
- 2000: Cast Away as Russian old women
- 2003: Muhtar's Return as an elderly woman
- 2006: 9 Мonths as Klavdia Stepanovna, worker hospital
- 2006: Flesh.ka as old woman in village Moshkino
- 2006: The Last Confession as old woman Marusya
- 2008: And Yet I Love... as watcher
- 2011: The Best Movie 3 as Utyosov's mother
- 2013: Vangelia as Olga, Aleksei Neznamov's wife (at the age of 90 she' s)
- 2013: Molodezhka as Mikhail Ponomarev's Grandma
- 2014: Chernobyl: Zone of Exclusion as Yevgenia Mikhailovna
- 2015: In the Spring Вlooming Love as aunt Klava
- 2015: Green Carriage as aunt Valya
