= Anfisa Chekhova =

Russian singer & actress (born 1977)

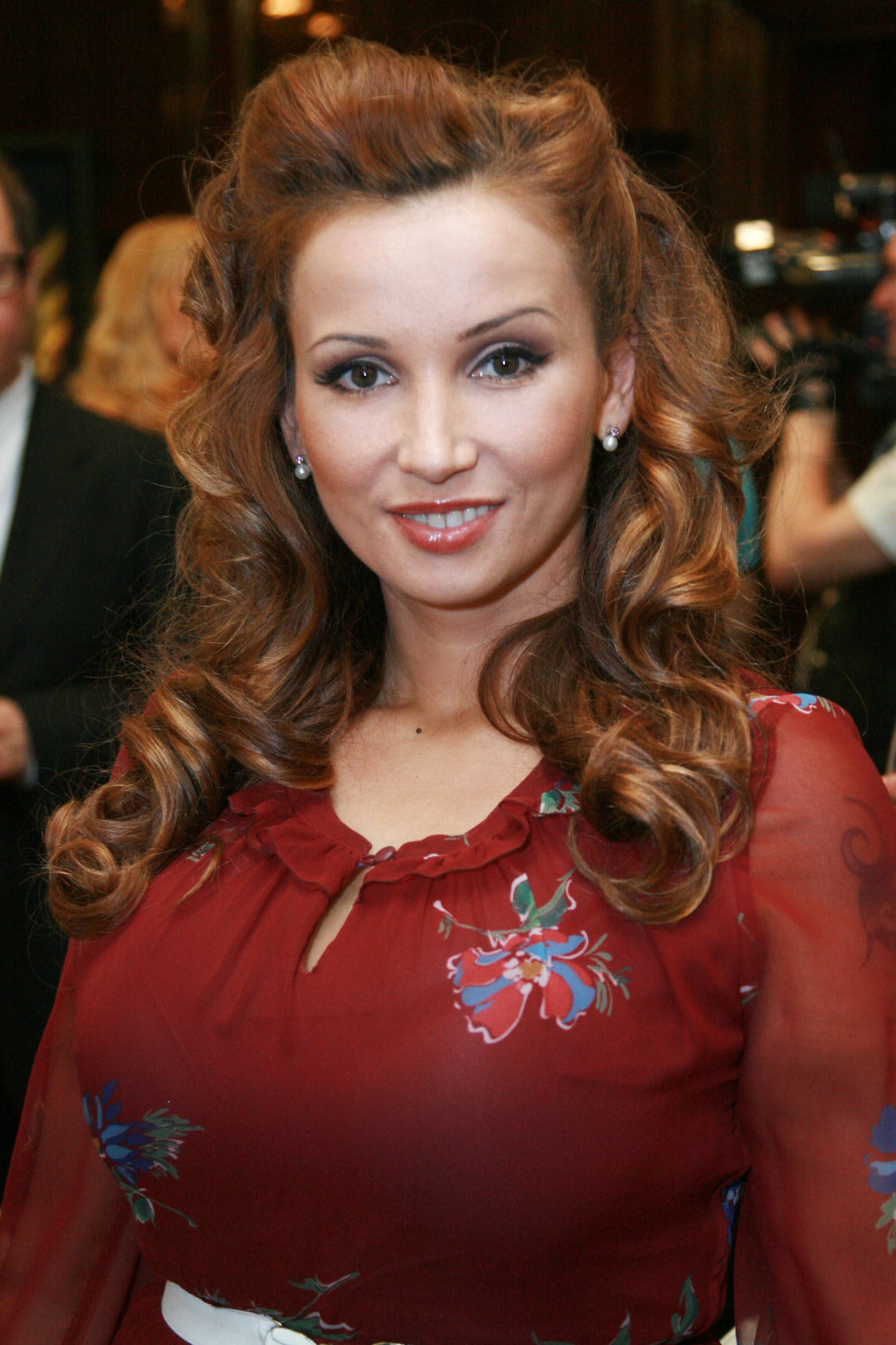
- Born: Anfisa Alexandrovna Chekhova; 21 December 1977 (age 48); Moscow, Russian SFSR, Soviet Union
- Citizenship: Russian
- Anfisa Chekhova's voice Chekhova on the Echo of Moscow program, 7 June 2007

Anfisa Alexandrovna Chekhova (Russian: Анфи́са Александровна Че́хова; born December 21, 1977, Moscow, USSR) is a Russian television and radio presenter, singer, and actress.

== Biography ==
Chekhova was born on December 21, 1977, in Moscow, to an athlete father and a teacher mother.

She went to three different schools during childhood. The last was the School of Aesthetic Education with a theatrical slant in No. 123.

She entered GITIS, but not immediately after graduation. In the first year, she failed the exams, and entered only the next. She did not manage to finish the training. She subsequently began a musical career after that. She then received an offer from the Muz TV channel to become a TV host to one of their entertainment programs, and took advantage of them.

In 2005–2009, Chekhova was the host of the Sex with Anfisa Chekhova program on the Russian TV channel TNT. In September 1, 2009, Chekhova debuted on the theater stage.

In 2011 she took part in the Ukrainian TV show Tantsi z zirkamy. Now the leading Ukrainian version of the Russian television program Let's Get Married and Weighted and Happy People (analogue of The Biggest Loser) on the STS.

She has starred in the films You I Love, S. S. D., Hitler Goes Kaput! and others.

== Political position ==
In 2012, she defended Pussy Riot.

In October 2017, the Good Deeds Party proposed Chekhova to run in the presidential election of 2018, to defend the interests of the people on the main channels of Russian television. Chekhova published the text of the appeal to Instagram, stating that she would accept the offer if her post gained 200 thousand likes.

On March 19, 2025, Anfisa Chekhova became a member of the New People Party.

== Personal life ==
In the summer of 2009, Anfisa Chekhova began to date actor Guram Bablishvili. They had a son, Solomon, who was born on May 12, 2012. In June 2015, Chekhova and Bablishvili officially married, but in the spring of 2017, they divorced.
