= A Trip to Wiesbaden =

- Russian: Поездка в Висбаден
- Directed by: Yevgeni Gerasimov
- Written by: Aleksey Batalov; Ivan Turgenev
- Starring: Sergey Zhigunov; Yelena Seropova; Natalya Lapina; Zinoviy Gerdt; Zeinab Botsvadze
- Cinematography: Sergey Onufriev
- Edited by: Mariya Rodionova
- Music by: Nikolai Sidelnikov
- Release date: 1989
- Country: Soviet Union
- Language: Russian

A Trip to Wiesbaden (Russian: Поездка в Висбаден) is a 1989 Soviet romantic drama film directed by Yevgeni Gerasimov. It is based on the novella Torrents of Spring by Ivan Turgenev.

== Plot ==
Dmitry Sanin goes to Frankfurt, where he meets the daughter of a coffee house owner named Gemma, whom she falls in love with. This feeling is mutual and they decide to start a family. For this, Sanin sells his small estate to the wife of his friend, Maria. And suddenly he realizes that Gemma is not at all the one he had been looking for all his life...

== Cast ==
- Sergey Zhigunov
- Yelena Seropova
- Natalya Lapina
- Zinoviy Gerdt
- Zeinab Botsvadze
- Vyacheslav Molokov
- Yevgeny Gerasimov
- Vladimir Shevelkov
- Artur Vardanyan
- Anatoli Shalyapin
