= La Niñera (Mexican TV series) =

- Genre: Sitcom
- Based on: The Nanny by: Fran Drescher; Peter Marc Jacobson
- Starring: Lissete; Paco De La O Roberto Leyva; Luciana Silveyra; Daniela Wong; Carlos Hays; Gala; Emma Parga; Martha Verduzco; America Gabriel
- Country of origin: Mexico
- Original language: Spanish
- No. of seasons: 1
- No. of episodes: 20

Production
- Executive producer: Yolanda Fernández
- Production location: Mexico
- Running time: 23 minutes (est.)

Original release
- Network: Azteca 7
- Release: July 18 – December 19, 2007

Related
- The Nanny

La Niñera is a Mexican sitcom based on The Nanny. It stars Lissete who plays Fran Flores, a charming and friendly resident from Roma. She accidentally becomes the nanny of three upper-class children in Mexico. The opening theme song is sung by the main character, Lissete.

It was first introduced into Mexico by TV Azteca, as well as Los Simpsons (The Simpsons), both of which were major programs helping the rise of Fox Network in the US. Early in its life TV Azteca mainly relied on imported programming such as this show.

A local Spanish version of The Nanny in Argentina, released in 2004, was also titled La Niñera.

== Plot ==
The story revolves around Fran Flores, who is fired from her job as a bridal consultant in her boyfriend's store. After working in the cosmetics line "Elba Esther," ends up as a nanny for theater producer Maximiliano Fabregas. After that, she experiences many adventures with his children, Maximiliano's assistant, Sisi, (who is in love with him), and Nicholas the Butler.

== Cast ==
- Lissete as Fran
- Francisco De La O as Maximiliano
- Roberto Leyva as Nicolas
- Luciana Silveyra as Sisi
- Daniela Wong as Julieta
- Carlos Hays as Fausto
- Gala Montes as Elenita
- Emma Parga as Teresa
- Marta Verduzco as Grandmother Tete

== Guest appearances ==
- Victor Garcia
- Lupita Sandoval
- Regina Torne
- Amaranta Ruiz
- Sergio Sepúlveda

== Episodes ==
No.	Title	Original release date
1	"La Niñera"	July 18, 2007
2	"El mayordomo, el esposo, la esposa y su madre"	July 25, 2007
3	"El humo de tus mentiras"	August 1, 2007
4	"La nana bella"	August 8, 2007
5	"La nena de la boda"	August 15, 2007
6	"El mal tercio"	September 5, 2007
7	"Amigo imaginario"	September 12, 2007
8	"Negocios personales"	September 19, 2007
9	"La nana que se creyó suegra"	September 23, 2007
10	"La fosa nanal"	September 23, 2007
11	"El show debe continuar"	October 10, 2007
12	"Julieta, la modelo"	October 24, 2007
13	"Plomeria familiar"	October 31, 2007
14	"Dolor de garganta"	November 7, 2007
15	"Atrapados sin salida"	November 11, 2007
16	"Paren la boda, que me quiero bajar"	November 21, 2007
17	"Domingo en el parque con Fran"	November 28, 2007
18	"La Miss de deportes"	December 5, 2007
19	"Papito querido (Oda a Juan Gabriel)"	December 12, 2007
20	"El dilema de Fran"	December 19, 2007

== Trivia ==
- Ingrid Coronado was originally going to be cast as Fran.
- The song is sung by Lissete, the main star.
- Fran is a fan of Juan Gabriel.
- The opening credits are very similar to the original American series, The Nanny.

== See also ==
- List of foreign adaptations of The Nanny
