= The Witches Cave =

- DVD cover
- Directed by: Yuri Moroz
- Written by: Kir Bulychov
- Produced by: Igor Nosov; Vladislav Sverkunov
- Starring: Sergey Zhigunov; Marina Levtova; Dmitry Pevtsov; Nikolai Karachentsov; Igor Yasulovich; Zhanna Prokhorenko
- Cinematography: Alexander Filatov; Alexander Krupnikov
- Edited by: Valentina Mironova
- Music by: Maksim Dunayevsky
- Production companies: Gorky Film Studio; Czechoslovak Television Bratislava; Barrandov Studios
- Release date: 1989
- Running time: 81 min
- Countries: Soviet Union; Czechoslovakia
- Language: Russian

The Witches Cave (Russian: Подземелье ведьм) is a 1989 science fantasy film from Gorky Film Studio, USSR and Barrandov Studios, Czechoslovakia.

The script was written by Kir Bulychov based on his own story and directed by Yuri Moroz. The cast featured Sergei Zhigunov as Andrei Bruce, Marina Levtova as Belogurochka, Dmitry Pevtsov as Oktin Khash, and Nikolai Karachentsov as cosmolinguist Jean. The movie had two nominations in the 1991 Nika Awards.

== Plot summary ==
An interstellar expedition is sent to study a strange planet called Evur (Evolutionary Aberration), located far from Earth. This world, reminiscent of Earth, hosts creatures from various Earth time periods—including mammoths, pterodactyls, dinosaurs, horses, and birds—and is populated by nearly identical-to-human natives who live in a stone-age-level society but possess metal weapons. After a treacherous attack by the tribal chief Oktin-Khash on the Earthlings’ base, only two members, the ethnologist inspector Andrei Brus and the linguist Jean, survive and are taken captive. Jean is escorted to the Sanctuary of the Witches by a river, where mysterious black-clad beings take him away. Andrei manages to escape with the help of a native girl, Billegurri (White Swan), and sets off to rescue his friend. Facing numerous dangers, they uncover the secrets of the strange planet, eventually learning that an advanced alien race had conducted an unprecedented experiment here to merge different epochs of time, though this grand plan ultimately fell victim to the ambitions of the tribal leader.

== Cast ==
- Sergey Zhigunov — Andrew Bruce, Inspector (voiced by Vladimir Antonik)
- Nikolai Karachentsov — Jean Lemot, ethnographer, translator
- Dmitry Pevtsov — Oktin-Hash, the leader of savages
- Vyacheslav Kovalkov — Krylov, the astronaut
- Marina Levtova — Billegurri (Belogurochka) - daughter and heiress of the leader of a friendly tribe
- Igor Yasulovich — Konrad Zhmuda, ethnographer
- Andrey Leonov - co-pilot
- Anatoly Mambetov - Mute
- Zhanna Prokhorenko - Ingrid Khan, paramedic
- Willor Kuznetsov - The White Wolf
- Sergei Bystritsky - Billegurri's brother
- Volodymyr Talashko - Axel, ethnographer
- Leonid Filatkin - U-Ush, the last Neanderthal

== See also ==
- List of films featuring dinosaurs
