= It Happened Near the Sea =

- Russian: Это было у моря
- Directed by: Ayan Shakhmaliyeva
- Written by: V. Klykov
- Starring: Nika Turbina; Irina Annina; Dinara Drukarova; Svetlana Kryuchkova; Yekaterina Politova; Ivan Kuzmin; Valentina Ananina
- Cinematography: Sergey Yurizditskiy
- Music by: Aleksandr Knaifel
- Release date: 1989
- Country: Soviet Union
- Language: Russian

It Happened Near the Sea (Russian: Это было у моря) is a 1989 Soviet drama film directed by Ayan Shakhmaliyeva. It was made during the dying days of the Soviet Union, and reflects the growing discontent towards the Soviet system. In a couple of scenes it mentions the Soviet–Afghan War, with one girl's father revealed to be fighting in the war. That war ended in February that year with Soviet withdrawal and failure. Just a few months after the film was made came the Fall of the Berlin Wall and the eventual collapse of the Soviet Union. As well as its critical stance on Communism, it was controversial due to nude scenes involving some of the young cast in the medical scenes.

== Plot ==
The film begins with the arrival of a young girl called Ilona (Yekaterina Politova), who is brought somewhat reluctantly by her parents to a boarding school clinic, which treats children with polio and other spinal issues. Life at the school is regimented, with exercises in the morning, lessons during the day, and all pupils compelled to sit and watch Soviet State TV broadcasts in the evenings. Ilona discovers that all meals have to be eaten in full, while she later has a necklace removed by school teacher Zoya Grigorievna (Nina Ruslanova) because it is a Western necklace and all things from the West are barred under Soviet Union rules. She also discovers that no one is allowed to leave the school. Despite being a main character, Ilona is very much an outsider at the school, watching on from the sidelines.

The dominant character among the pupils is Sveta Dzugutov (Nika Turbina), who early on defies the school rules by absconding during the night to visit someone in a nursing home. She is caught coming back and faces reprimand from the headmistress Iraida Kuchminichna (Svetlana Kryuchkova), who wants to expel her due to her rebellious nature and Western inclinations, but fellow teacher Zoya persuades her to give her another chance. Sveta has also broken her bodycast, which has to be reset by the doctors and is later observed by Ilona, who is apprehensive about having to wear a bodycast and what awaits her.

Later Ilona observes Sveta and some of the other girls bullying and pranking one of the younger girls. The headmistress arranges a school dance where Soviet sailors are official visitors. During the dance Sveta puts on the Western record "Rock Around the Clock" and encourages a boy and later half the class to dance to it. Later she and the boy canoodle under the stairs. Meanwhile, Zoya discovers the bullied girl lying in the corridor unconscious and carries her to the girls' domitory, where she shows them a letter the girl has written stating she drank alcohol in order to poison herself as she could no longer put up with their bullying. The next day Sveta goes onto the window ledge, remorseful at her actions, but Zoya drags her back in and slaps her about before storming off.

This proves the breaking point for the pupils. Enraged, Sveta organizes a rally outside the school in the evening denouncing school rules and the pupils defy Zoya when she order them indoors. Realizing she is powerless, she goes to a restaurant where headmistress Iraida is entertaining a gentleman to tell her of the pupils rebellion, but is embarrassed by Iraida's coolness towards her and heads back to the school. The pupils meanwhile wander about the streets, or talk in groups. One girl reveals her father is fighting in the Soviet–Afghan War and her anger about it (a conflict that would end in failure for the Soviet Union just weeks after the film was made). Meanwhile, a boy shows new girl Ilona around the streets and the deprived children forgotten by the State, before he then attempts to embrace her. Zoya sees this but is unable to intervene and returns to the school to go to bed, only for Sveta and some of the girls to throw a brick through the window. Zoya then discovers they have added a cap to the statue of Lenin stood outside the school in another action of defiance against Soviet and school rules.

The next morning Zoya catches up with Sveta and some of the girls and while berating their behaviour admits she too was a pupil at the school and had to put up with rules like the school being able to open and censor their letters. Returning to the school, they face the headmistress, who threatens expulsion to some of the girls unless they reveal the ringleader, reminding them that some of their parents have paid to have them at the school and that they would be denied good references to better schools. She also demotes Zoya, hoping to crush the rebellion, but instead the girls refuse to comply. Frustrated at this unexpected resistance, in spite Iraida expels two of the younger girls.

Later the girls listen to a State speech by the founder of the school, Ivan Ivanovich Losev (Viktor Gogolev), telling of his pride of founding the school and what it stands for, but the pupils are no longer impressed by the rhetoric and dully stand by. Meanwhile, Ilona is forced by the doctors to have her bodycast, despite her best efforts to resist, partly due to the impression it will make on her new boyfriend, but also because the cast has become a symbol of conformity and control by the school. The film ends with teacher Zoya - now a cleaner - in the TV room listening to Soviet state news with the other pupils. As the pupils file out, temporarily disheartened but still mutinous, Zoya goes over and switches off the TV, now no longer believing in the Soviet system she grew up in.

== Cast ==
- Nika Turbina
- Irina Annina
- Dinara Drukarova
- Svetlana Kryuchkova
- Ivan Kuzmin
- Yekaterina Politova
- Alla Meshcheryakova
- Daniil Mishin
- Nina Ruslanova
- Valentina Ananina
- Valentina Titova
- Nikolay Lavrov
