= The Initiated =

- Russian: Посвящённый
- Directed by: Oleg Teptsov
- Written by: Yuri Arabov
- Starring: Gor Oganisyan; Lyubov Polishchuk; Aleksandr Trofimov; Yelena Bragina; Sergey Makovetskiy
- Cinematography: Valeri Myulgaut
- Music by: Sergei Kuryokhin
- Release date: 1989
- Running time: 107 minutes
- Country: Soviet Union
- Language: Russian

The Initiated (Russian: Посвящённый) is a 1989 Soviet drama film directed by Oleg Teptsov.

== Plot ==
The film tells about a man who, through a book on magic rituals of Africa, has gained the ability to punish people with the strength of his spirit, but can he use it?

== Cast ==
- Gor Oganisyan as Volodya
- Lyubov Polishchuk as Mother
- Aleksandr Trofimov as Frolov
- Yelena Bragina as Vera
- Sergey Makovetskiy as Lyokha
- Vladimir Simonov as Dumb
- Gabriel Vorobyov as Nikolay
- Olga Samoshina as Sveta
- Alisa Fomina
- David Oganisyan
