= Anatoly Eiramdzhan =

Russian-Armenian film director, writer and producer

Anatoly Nikolaievich Eiramdzhan (sometimes transliterated as Eiramjan; Russian: Анатолий Николаевич Эйрамджан, Armenian: Անատոլի Նիկողայոսի Էյրամջյան; January 3, 1937 – September 23, 2014) was a Russian-Armenian film director, screenwriter, and producer. He was the creator of the first commercial film in the Soviet Union and also wrote humorous stories and sketches.

Eiramdzhan began his career in the 1970s as a screenwriter. In 1989, he started directing films based on his own scripts. In 1992, he founded the New Odeon film studio, where he served as director, screenwriter, and producer of his projects. He was sometimes compared to Ed Wood for his practice of shooting films quickly and on limited budgets. Despite this, his work is noted for sustaining film production during the decline of the Russian film industry in the 1990s and for providing employment opportunities to many actors.

== Biography ==
Anatoly Eiramdzhan was born in 1937 in Baku, Azerbaijan SSR.

His father, Nikolay Nikolaevich Ter-Grigoryan, was a music and piano teacher. His mother, Arevik Nikitichna Eiramdzhan, from whom he took his surname, was the granddaughter of Armenian writer Ghazaros Aghayan (1840–1911). He was a cousin of composer and public figure Eduard Khagogortian and a nephew of painter Martiros Saryan.

Eiramdzhan was married to Oksana Shagdar, an engineer-programmer by education, who also worked in cinema as an assistant director, photographer, make-up artist, actress, and camerawoman. Her last credited film work was as a camerawoman for the music video of "Charmed, Enchanted" by Russian singer Mikhail Zvezdinsky.

In 1961, Eiramdzhan graduated from the Azerbaijan Institute of Oil and Chemistry. In 1972, he completed a three-year program in screenwriting at the High Courses for Scriptwriters and Film Directors under the supervision of Iosif Olshansky. After graduation, he began writing film scripts.

In addition to his screenplays, Eiramdzhan wrote short comic stories. In 1972–1973, he received the "Golden Calf Award" from the Russian newspaper Literaturnaya Gazeta.

In 1989, he began producing films based on his own scripts. In 1992, he founded the New Odeon film studio in Moscow, which focused on producing low-budget comedies. At the studio, he worked as director, screenwriter, and art director, creating 22 films.

Eiramdzhan also published several books. His first, The Ladies' Man and Other Comedy Films, was released in 1995 by the publishing house Author, Inc. and included scripts of his comedies. His 1997 film The Impotent Man received the Golden Demetra Award at the Yalta International Film Festival, chaired by Emil Loteanu and Vladimir Motyl. In 2006, his second book, From Everyone One Thread, was published by Golos-Press. This was followed in 2012 by The Shirt for Naked, which included stories, scripts, and plays with illustrations by Vagrich Bakhchanyan. In 2014, his fourth book, Where Is Nophelet and Something Else…, was released, featuring additional screenplays and short stories.

Since 2003, Eiramdzhan lived in Miami, Florida, with his wife Oksana Shagdar and their son, Nikolay (nicknamed Koka).

Eiramdzhan's films, both those he directed and those adapted from his scripts, remain popular with Russian audiences. His work is credited with demonstrating the viability of independent low-budget commercial cinema in Russia during the post-Soviet era. His comedies were distinct from both Soviet and post-Soviet traditions and attracted large theater and television audiences.

At the time of his death, about 15 of his scripts, the libretto for the musical His Majesty's Occasion (based on the life of O. Henry), and the play Lyosha Is to Blame for Everything remained unproduced. Many of these works were later published in his books.

Eiramdzhan died of cardiac arrest in Miami, Florida, on September 23, 2014, at the age of 77. He was buried at Southern Memorial Park in Miami.

== Filmography ==
=== As screenwriter ===
- Fellows Villager (1973) — screenwriter
- What Is Our Life? (1975) — screenwriter
- Let's Meet at the Fountain (1976) — screenwriter
- If I Were the Chief (1980) — screenwriter
- Where Will It Lead? (1981) — screenwriter
- The Time of Red Apples (1981) — screenwriter
- The Journey Will Be Pleasant (1982) — screenwriter
- Vitya Glushakov – A Friend of the Apaches (1983) — screenwriter
- The Most Charming and Attractive (1985) — screenwriter
- Where Is the Nophelet? (1987) — screenwriter

=== As director and screenwriter ===
- For Fine Ladies! (1989) — director, screenwriter
- The Ladies' Man (1990) — director, screenwriter
- My Seawoman (1990) — director, screenwriter
- Real Man (short film) (1991) — producer, director, screenwriter

=== As producer, director, and screenwriter ===
- New Odeon (1992)
- Old Records (short film) (1993)
- The Groom from Miami (1994)
- The Third Is Not Superfluous (1994)
- The Impotent Man (1996) — winner of the "Golden Demetra" Award, Yalta International Film Festival (1997)
- Night Visit (1997)
- When We Are Not Strangers (1998)
- Prima Donna Mary (1998)
- The Ultimatum (1999)
- Valentine's Day (2000)
- The Agent in the Miniskirt (2000)
- The Mistress from Moscow (2001)
- Secret Appointment (2001)
- We Made It! (2001)
- The Son of the Loser (2002)
- Arrow of Love (2002)
- A peck kiss (2003)
- The Braked Reflex (2004)
- To Marry in 24 Hours (2004)
- The Gift of Nature (2005)

== Critics ==
The newspaper Kultura wrote:

The work of Anatoly Eiramdzhan can be viewed in different ways. Some (primarily film critics) smile indulgently or even contemptuously when his films are mentioned. Others (primarily distributors), on the contrary, believe that he makes strong films that appeal to mass audiences. Still, it is difficult not to express surprise and respect for the fact that, regardless of circumstances, Eiramdzhan continues to make films.

The newspaper Vzglyad noted:

In the so-called intellectual environment, a good word about Anatoly Eiramdzhan was then, and is now, considered inappropriate. Despite numerous attempts, I never managed to publish a single positive paragraph about Eiramdzhan's films in the cinematic press, although some films and some techniques of the director have always impressed me. They impressed me, but not others. — Igor Mantsov

The Armenian weekly newspaper Ether commented:

Audiences love the comedies of Anatoly Eiramdzhan and praise them. Critics, meanwhile, secretly watch his comedies with their families but, as a rule, publicly criticize them harshly—because that is what critics do.

Film critic Igor Mantsov described Eiramdzhan as "the most stable, accurate, and professional cinematographer of the decade (i.e. the 1990s), a true knight of low-budget cinema, who, with limited resources during a period of collapse in the film industry, managed to produce one farce after another—films at which only the lazy refrained from sneering."
