= Anastasia Zavorotnyuk =

Russian actress and television presenter (1971–2024)

- Анастасия Заворотнюк
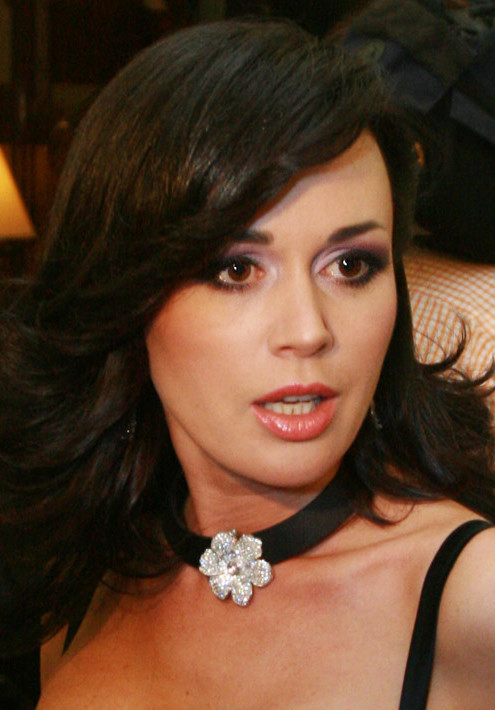
- Zavorotnyuk in 2010
- Born: Anastasia Yuryevna Zavorotnyuk; 3 April 1971; Astrakhan, Russian SFSR, Soviet Union
- Died: 29 May 2024 (aged 53); Moscow, Russia
- Burial place: Troyekurovskoye Cemetery, Moscow; 55°42′00″N 37°24′32″E
- Occupations: Actress; television presenter
- Years active: 1991–2019
- Spouses: Olaf Schwarzkopf (m. 1994; div. 1995) Dmitry Striukov (m. 1996; div. 2006) Peter Tchernyshev (m. 2008)
- Children: 3

Anastasia Yuryevna Zavorotnyuk (Russian: Анастасия Юрьевна Заворотнюк; 3 April 1971 – 29 May 2024) was a Russian actress and television presenter. She was best known for her lead role on My Fair Nanny (2004–2009). Zavorotnyuk also starred in over 30 films and television series.

== Early life ==
Zavorotnyuk was born in Astrakhan on 3 April 1971. Her mother, People's Artist of Russia Valentina Borisovna Zavorotnyuk, worked in the Astrakhan Youth Theatre. Her father, Yuri Zavorotnyuk, worked on television and was a member of the Academy of Russian Television. Zavorotnyuk received dance and acting lessons at the Moscow Art Theatre. In 1991, she took part in her first film playing Masha.

== Career ==
After graduating from the Moscow Art Theatre School in 1993, she became an actress under the direction of Oleg Tabakov. Over 10 years in the theatre, she had been in 29 productions. She was famous for her role in My Fair Nanny, which is a remake of the U.S. series The Nanny. She called and was offered the series, which she had no idea. Her Ukrainian accent was borrowed from Olga Blok-Mirimskaya, a colleague at the theater.

In addition to acting, Zavorotnyuk acted as a presenter. In 2005, she replaced Tina Kandelaki on the program "Good Song" on the TRK Ukraine. She also participated in the first season of "Two Stars" with Mikhail Boyarsky and came in 2nd place.

== Personal life ==
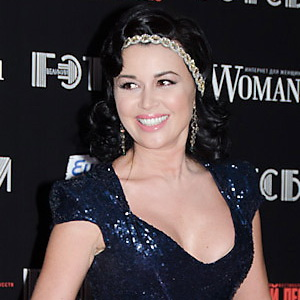
Zavorotnyuk in 2013

Zavorotnyuk was married three times. Her first marriage was to a German businessman but lasted only one year. Her second marriage was to Dmitry Striukov, with whom she opened a real estate agency. They had two children, Anna and Michael.

From 2006 to 2008 she dated actor and co-star on My Fair Nanny Sergey Zhigunov.

On 22 September 2008, she married figure skater Peter Tchernyshev at the Foros Church in Crimea. In October 2018, the couple had a daughter, Mila.

=== Illness and death ===
In September 2019, Zavorotnyuk was reported to have been diagnosed with brain cancer stage IV around the time of giving birth to her daughter, Mila, in October 2018, with rumours of her diagnosis dating back as early as August 2019 when fans had noticed a scar on her neck which, as was theorised, might suggest a biopsy to test for cancer. In May 2020, it was confirmed that Zavorotnyuk was diagnosed with glioblastoma.

Zavorotnyuk died from the disease in Moscow, on 29 May 2024, at the age of 53. She is buried at the Troyekurovskoye Cemetery in Moscow.

== Filmography ==
=== Film ===
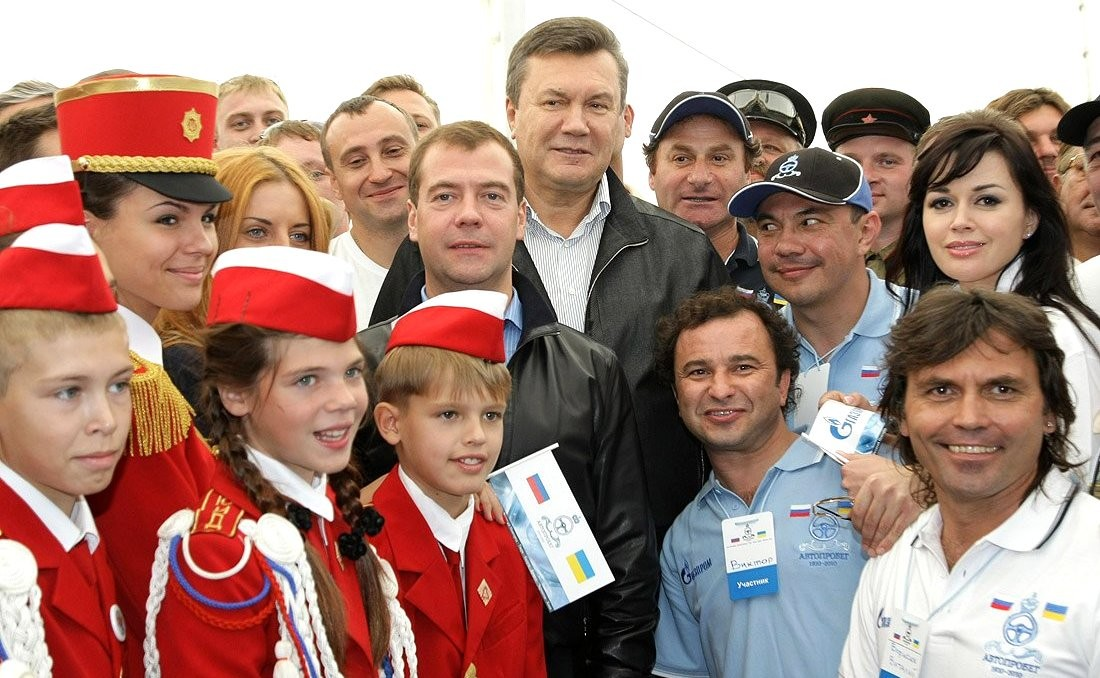
Zavorotnyuk with Russian president Dmitry Medvedev and Ukrainian president Viktor Yanukovych in 2010

| Year | Film | Role | Notes |
|---|---|---|---|
| 1991 | Masha | Masha | |
| 1993 | Dashing Couple | Lizka | |
| 2002 | Heir | Anastasia | |
| 2007 | The Apocalypse Code | Daria/Marie | |
| 2007 | Shakespeare Never Dreamed Of | Lison | |
| 2008 | Ideal Woman | Lyuba | |
| 2008 | Artifact | It | |
| 2009 | Gogol. Nearest | Smirnova-Rosset | |
| 2011 | Office Romance. Our Time | Olga Ryzhova | |

=== Television ===
| Year | Television series | Role | Notes |
|---|---|---|---|
| 2004–2009 | My Fair Nanny | Nanny Victoria | |
