= Sergey Zhigunov =

Russian actor

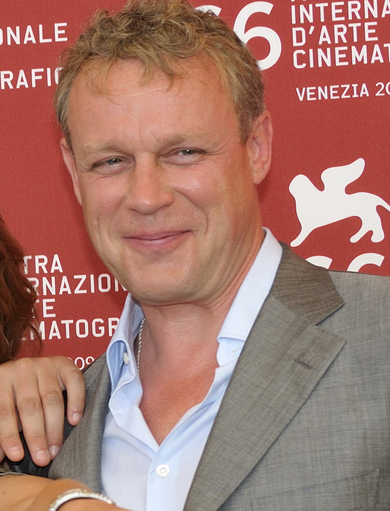
- Sergey Zhigunov in Venice Film Festival, 2009
- Born: Sergey Victorovich Zhigunov; 2 January 1963 (age 63); Rostov-on-Don, Russian SFSR, Soviet Union
- Occupations: Actor, film producer, television presenter
- Years active: 1983-present

Sergey Victorovich Zhigunov (Russian: Серге́й Викторович Жигунов; born 2 January 1963) is a Soviet and Russian actor and producer. Commander of the Order of Honour and of the Order of Friendship. Honored Artist of Russia (1995).

His most famous roles as an actor were in Nero Wolfe and Archie Goodwin (2001), Queen Margot (1996), Hearts of Three (1992), and Gardemarines ahead! (1988), The Witches Cave (1990). He also started as Maksim Viktoroviс Shatalin (Maxwell Sheffield) in My Fair Nanny (2004-2009), a Russian remake of the American sitcom The Nanny.

== Early life and education ==
Sergey Zhigunov was born on January 2, 1963, in Rostov-on-Don into an acting family. After the eighth grade of high school, he was expelled from it for bad behavior. He studied in Rostov secondary schools - first at school number 20, then at school number 75, and at the Rimsky-Korsakov music school. He participated in one of the school ensembles, played the guitar and sang.

He first entered the Shchukin Higher Theater School in 1980, but was soon expelled for "incompetence", as he began acting in films and almost abandoned his studies. Returning to Rostov-on-Don, he played in the Rostov Theater of the Young Spectator. A year later, in 1982, he recovered at the Shchukin School already on another course (the artistic director of the course - Marianna Rubenovna Ter-Zakharova) and graduated from it in 1986.

== Career ==
During auditions for the film “Midshipmen, Forward!"(1987) was drafted into military service in the ranks of the Soviet army, and in order to stay on the set, he was enlisted and served in the 11th separate cavalry regiment, in Alabino, Moscow region. On the set of this picture, Zhigunov was seriously injured, as a result of which his role had to be voiced by Oleg Menshikov, since Zhigunov was in the hospital. The director of fencing battles on the "Midshipmen" Vladimir Balon told about this in one of his interviews: "Once I almost took Zhigunov's eye off. There are common truths in fencing. One of them: never hit the sword up. He did it. My sword hit him in the eye. If the rapier was a little lower, he would have been left without an eye. And a little deeper - maybe it would not have been».

As a child, Zhigunov dreamed of becoming a musketeer, and the embodiment of this dream was the work on the TV serial Three Musketeers (2013), which became his directorial debut. The film is a new adaptation of the novel The Three Musketeers by Alexandre Dumas, the premiere of which took place in Russia January 3, 2014, on the "First Channel".

In 1998, in Texas, on the set of the series "Walker, Texas Ranger" he interviewed Chuck Norris for his television show “Movie Star”. Chuck Norris talked about Walker, his films, the characters, his career, martial arts, the Kickstart Kids and the famous people he worked with.

== Honors ==
- Honored Artist of Russia (1995)
- Prize of the Guild of Russian Film Actors "For creative initiative and contribution to the development of domestic cinema" (KF "Sozvezdie-97")
- Awarded the Order of Friendship (2005), the Order of Honor (2014)

== Selected filmography ==
=== Actor ===
- Chance (Шанс, 1984) as Aleksandr Grubin
- Through Main Street with an Orchestra (По главной улице с оркестром, 1987) as lieutenant Zhigunov
- Gardemarines ahead! (Гардемарины, вперёд!, 1988) as Alexander Belov
- The Witches Cave (Подземелье ведьм, 1989) as Andrei Bruce
- Viva Gardes-Marines! (Виват, гардемарины!, 1991) as Alexander Belov
- Terra Nova (Новая Земля, 2008) as colonel
- Ten Winters (Dieci inverni, 2009) as Fyodor
- My Fair Nanny (Моя прекрасная няня, 2004-2009) as Maksim Shatalin
- Hearts of Three (Сердца трех, 1992) as Henry Morgan

=== Director ===
- A Trip to Wiesbaden (Поездка в Висбаден, 1989)
- The Three Musketeers (Три мушкетёра, 2013)

=== Producer ===
- The Apocalypse Code (Код апокалипсиса, 2007)

== Other roles and achievements ==
- Since 1990 - General Director of TO "Chance" film concern " Mosfilm ". At present, he is the general director of Prime Time LLC, Sergei Zhigunov's Producer Center LLC, Studio 7 LLC
- March 8, 1991, for the program Kinoserpantin interviewed the singer Igor Talkov.
- 1992 - Member of the Union of Cinematographers of the Russian Federation.
- 1997-1998 - Deputy General Producer of the TV Center TV channel.
- 1998 - head of the Svet studio.
- 1999 - President of the Sozvezdie Film Festival, Arkhangelsk. Producer of the Pelican studio.
- 2000-2005 - President of the Russian Film Actors Guild.
- 2002-2005 - Secretary of the Union of Cinematographers of the Russian Federation.
- 2003-2006 - Member of the Council for Culture and Arts under the President of the Russian Federation.
- In 2006, in a duet with Laima Vaikule, he took third place in the Two Stars show on Channel One.
- February 2009 - Advisor on Ideology and Advertising of the Federal Agency for Fisheries of the Russian Federation.
- Established the Sozvezdie Charitable Foundation for the Social Rehabilitation of Russian Cinema Actors. In January 2014, the fund was excluded from the Unified State Register of Legal Entities due to the termination of its activities.

== Bankruptcy and financial difficulties ==
On November 28, 2016, the Moscow Arbitration Court registered a statement by businessman Sergei Obidin declaring Sergei Zhigunov bankrupt.

On February 10, 2017, Sergei Obidin applied to the Moscow Arbitration Court with a petition for bankruptcy of Prime Time LLC (a company in which Sergei Zhigunov is a general director and a member).

Since October 2016, the Moscow Arbitration Court has registered several claims of various individual entrepreneurs, as well as large companies (OJSC Russian Railways) against LLC Sergei Zhigunov's Producer Center, testifying to the regular default on the part of the said company. To date, most of these claims have been satisfied.

On February 19, 2018, the Moscow Arbitration Court accepted the application of United Russian Film Studios JSC for bankruptcy of January Production LLC, a company 100% of the authorized capital of which belongs to Sergei Zhigunov.

== Personal life ==
- Father - Viktor Pavlovich Zhigunov, was the leading actor of the Rostov Drama Theater of the Palace of Culture of the Rostselmash plant, on the stage of which he played the role of Santa Claus on New Year's trees, a teacher of political economy.
- Mother - Galina Ivanovna Zhigunova (born 1944), was an actress, since 2005 she has been the chief director of the Theater for Young Spectators in the city of Sergiev Posad.
- Daughter - Maria Zhigunova (born September 5, 1990), starred in the films: " Undressed " (1998) and "Little Johnny" (2002).
- Stepdaughter - Anastasia (born 1980), the daughter of Vera Novikova from a previous marriage, whom Sergei Zhigunov raised as his own and calls her daughter. Anastasia has a daughter, Julia (born 2008).

He was married twice (from 1985 to March 2007 and from October 6, 2009, to October 2020) to Vera Semyonovna Novikova (born October 6, 1958), an actress of the Yevgeny Vakhtangov Theater.

From 2006 to May 2008 he dated actress and co-star on My Fair Nanny Anastasia Zavorotnyuk.

Since March 2021 he has been married to journalist Victoria Vorozhbit.
