= Lyubov Polishchuk =

Soviet actress

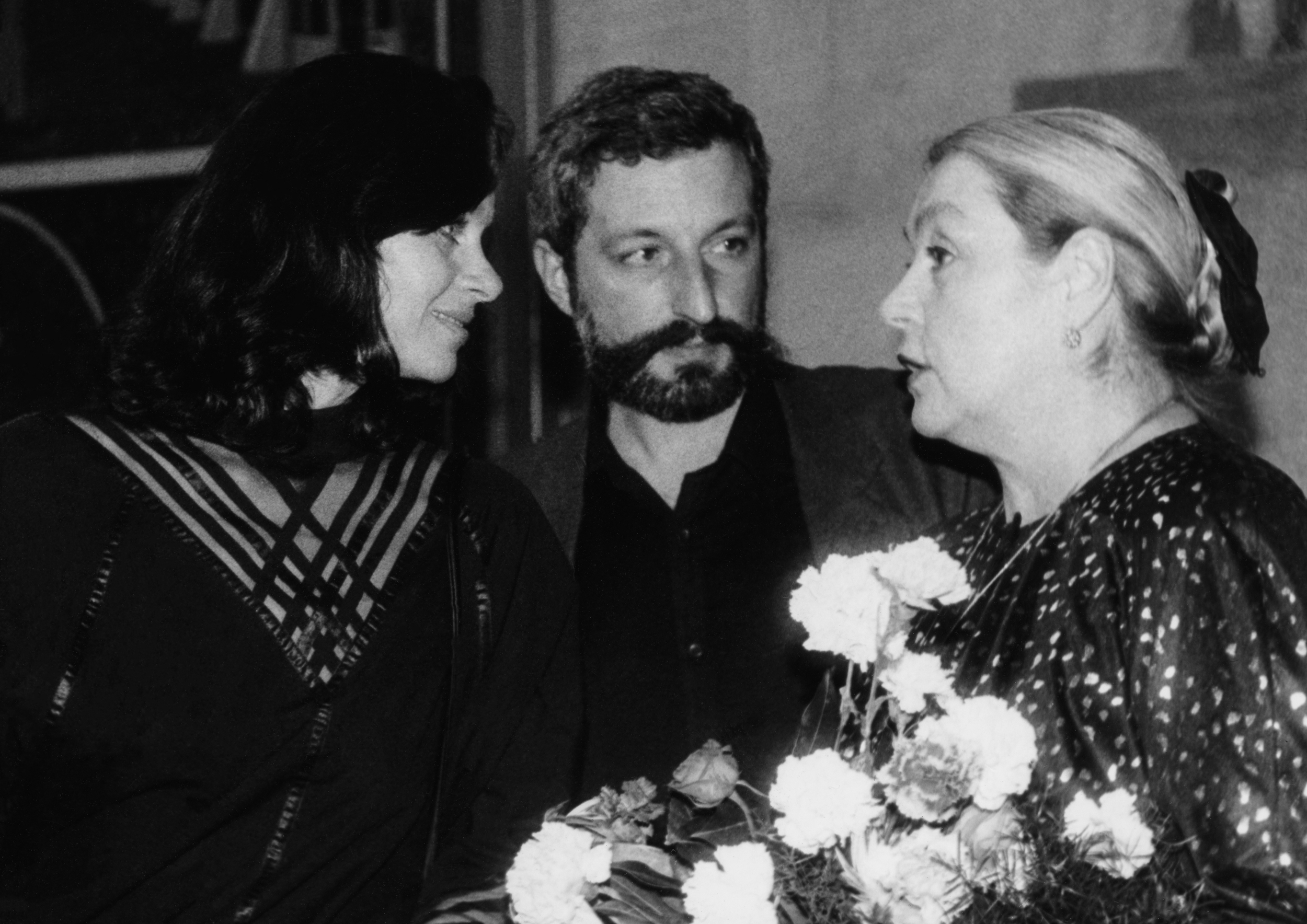
Lyubov Polishchuk (left), with her husband and Lidiya Fedoseyeva-Shukshina

Lyubov Grigoryevna Polishchuk (Russian: Любо́вь Григо́рьевна Полищу́к; 21 May 1949 – 28 November 2006) was a popular Russian actress. She was born in the Siberian city of Omsk. After school she decided to become an actress and moved to Moscow. She made her debut in cinema in 1976 in the popular comedy film The Twelve Chairs, which was directed by Mark Zakharov. Lyubov Polishchuk died of bone cancer in Moscow in 2006, aged 57. She was buried at the Troyekurovskoye Cemetery.

== Selected filmography ==
- The Twelve Chairs (1976) as dancer
- Golden Mine (1978) as Larisa Kovalyova
- 31 June (1978, TV Movie) as Miss Quinn, hostess of The Black Horse
- The Very Same Munchhausen (1979, TV Movie) as Bertha, songstress
- Babylon XX (1980) as Malva
- I Ask to Accuse Klava K. of My Death (1980) as Vera Sergeevna
- Secret of the Black Birds (1983) as Adele Fortescue
- Snake Catcher (1986) as Vera
- The Christians (1987) as Pelageya Karaulova
- Intergirl (1989) as Zina Meleyko, prostitute
- The Initiated (1989) as Mother
- Love with Privileges (1989) as Irina Vasilyevna Nikolaeva
- My Seawoman (1990) as lambada dancer
- The Recruiter (1991) as Zina
- Shirli-Myrli (1995) as Jennifer, USA Ambassador's wife
- Chivalric Romance (2000, TV Movie) as Irene Doukaina
- Still Waters (2000) as Pauline, Kashtanov's wife
- My Fair Nanny (2004-2009, TV Series) as Lyubov Grigorevna Prutkovskaya
- Star of the Era (2005, TV Mini-Series) as Plavnikova
- Kill Carp (2005) as Lydia Mikhailovna

== Honours and awards ==
- People's Artist of Russia (1994)
- Honoured Artist of Russia (1986)
- People's Artist of the Republic of Karelia (posthumously) (2007)
