= My Fair Nanny (TV series) =

Russian comedy television series

- Russian: Моя прекрасная няня
- Genre: Sitcom
- Based on: The Nanny by: Fran Drescher; Peter Marc Jacobson
- Directed by: Andrew Kuznetsov
- Starring: Anastasia Zavorotnyuk; Sergei Zhigunov; Boris Smolkin; Olga Prokofieva; Katia Dubakina; Paul Serdyuk; Irina Andreeva; Lyubov Polishchuk; Alexandra Nazarova
- Country of origin: Russia
- Original language: Russian
- No. of seasons: 7
- No. of episodes: 173

Production
- Producer: Alexander Akopov
- Running time: 22–25 minutes

Original release
- Network: STS
- Release: September 17, 2004 – January 1, 2009

My Fair Nanny (Russian: Моя прекрасная няня, romanized: Moya prekrasnaya nyanya) is a Russian comedy television series based on the American television sitcom The Nanny.

== Plot ==
The plot revolves around Viktoria Prutkovskaya, an energetic and extravagant woman, who is dumped by her boyfriend Anton. Now working as a cosmetics saleswoman, Viktoria finds herself in a house with Maksim Shatalin, a famous producer, widower, and father of three. Shatalin is going to throw a party for potential investors, and he desperately needs a nanny to look after his children. In desperation, he hires Viktoria, although he soon regrets his choice.

Masha, Dennis and Ksenia Shatalin, Maksim's children, do not initially have a very friendly attitude toward their new nanny, but she quickly changes that. Shatalin's household includes the butler, Constantine, and Chief Financial Officer Janna Arkadyevna Izhevskaya, a clever, know-it-all, and sarcastic business manager, who immediately finds things in common with the new nanny. But the cool, sociopathic Janna soon takes a disliking to Viktoria, being jealous of her interaction with Shatalin, who she has been in love with for many years.

The relationship between Constantine and Janna becomes complex. They were friends long before the start of the show, but later despise each other. Constantine and Janna often make snide comments about each other, but sometimes they can get along, and between them there is even some kind of sexual attraction.

An important aspect of the drama consists of numerous cousins, uncles and aunts from the Shatalin and Prutkovskaya families. They work closely with each other, but do not always get along. Victoria's mother, Lyubov, comes to visit almost every day. Victoria herself is not too delighted with Maksim's relatives, but family ties are very important to her.

The main story line is that of Maksim and Viktoria. Almost from the very beginning of the series, their relationship takes a different nature than simply the "nanny, and the father of the family." Victoria is responsible not only for the children but also for Maksim. The feelings between them appear in the first season, and increase more and more. But Maksim does not make the first move and tries to keep Victoria at a distance. At the end of the third season, Maksim has finally acknowledged his love for her, but early in the fourth season takes back his words, which leaves Victoria furious.

After that, their relationship changes. Viktoria is aware of Maksim's feelings, but realizes that she can not wait for him forever. In the sixth season, he proposes to her and they get married.

== Cast ==
- Anastasia Zavorotnyuk as Viktoria Vladimirovna Prutkovskaya (Fran Fine)
- Sergei Zhigunov as Maksim Viktorovich Shatalin (Maxwell Sheffield)
- Lyubov Polishchuk as Lyubov Grigoryevna Prutkovskaya (Sylvia Fine)
- Alexander Filippenko as Vladimir Vladimirovich Prutkovsky (Morty Fine; appeared in the 7th season after Lyubov Polishchuk had died)
- Irina Andreeva as Kseniya Maksimovna Shatalina (Grace Sheffield)
- Katia Dubakina as Mariya Maksimovna Shatalina (Margaret Sheffield)
- Pavel Serdyuk as Denis Maksimovich Shatalin (Brighton Shieffield)
- Boris Smolkin as Konstantin Nikolaevich Semyonov (Niles)
- Olga Prokofieva as Janna Arkadyevna Izhevskaya (C.C. Babcock)
- Alexandra Nazarova as Nadezhda Mihailovna (Yetta Rosenberg)
- Gulnara Nizhinskaya as Vera (Val Toriello)
- Olesya Zheleznyak as Galya Kopylova (Val's second counterpart after Nijinska left the show)
- Nina Ruslanova as Aunt Faya
- Olga Block Mirimskaya as Shura
- Tatyana Zhukova-Kirtbaya as Baba Sima
- Alexey Lysenkov as Janna's brother (Noel Babcock)

== Release ==
The first season of the show was released in 2004.
